= Tiger Jones =

American boxer

Ralph Jones
Personal information
- Born: March 14, 1928 Brooklyn, New York, U.S.
- Died: August 20, 1994 (aged 66) Queens, New York, U.S.
- Weight: Middleweight

Boxing career
- Stance: Orthodox

Boxing record
- Total fights: 89
- Wins: 52
- Win by KO: 13
- Losses: 32
- Draws: 5
- No contests: 0

Ralph "Tiger" Jones (March 14, 1928 – August 20, 1994) was a boxer during the 1950s. Trained by Gil Clancy, Jones was a fixture of televised boxing in the 1950s, known for an aggressive style that pleased fans. His overall record was 52 victories, 32 losses and five draws.

He became a professional boxer in 1950. In 1955 he scored an upset over Sugar Ray Robinson. Robinson was highly favored in the fight, which was Robinson's second during a comeback. That was only one of his wins against top-level fighters of that era. He also beat Joey Giardello and Kid Gavilán (both these fighters were world champions at one time and, in other fights, also defeated Jones). Fighters to whom he lost include world champions Gene Fullmer, Johnny Saxton, Paul Pender, and Carl "Bobo" Olson. In all, he fought six world champions on ten occasions.

After he retired, Jones drove a cab and worked for a canning company. He was survived by three sons and two grandchildren.

== Professional boxing record ==
89 fights	52 wins	32 losses
By knockout	13	1
By decision	39	31
By disqualification	0	0
Draws	5	

No.	Result	Record	Opponent	Type	Round	Date	Location
89	Loss	52–32–5	László Papp	PTS	10	Feb 21, 1962	Stadthalle, Vienna, Austria
88	Loss	52–31–5	Joe DeNucci	UD	10	Jan 23, 1962	Boston Garden, Boston, Massachusetts, U.S.
87	Win	52–30–5	Duane Horsman	UD	10	May 17, 1961	Mayo Civic Auditorium, Rochester, New York, U.S.
86	Loss	51–30–5	Rocky Fumerelle	UD	10	Apr 25, 1961	Memorial Auditorium, Buffalo, New York, U.S.
85	Draw	51–29–5	Joe DeNucci	PTS	10	Feb 24, 1961	Boston Garden, Boston, Massachusetts, U.S.
84	Loss	51–29–4	Joey Giambra	UD	10	Dec 6, 1960	Memorial Auditorium, Buffalo, New York, U.S.
83	Loss	51–28–4	Marcel Pigou	MD	10	Nov 5, 1960	Arena, Boston, Massachusetts, U.S.
82	Win	51–27–4	Joe DeNucci	UD	10	Apr 29, 1960	Arena, Boston, Massachusetts, U.S.
81	Win	50–27–4	Willie Greene	TKO	7 (10)	Mar 28, 1960	Rhode Island Auditorium, Providence, Rhode Island, U.S.
80	Loss	49–27–4	Wilf Greaves	UD	10	Feb 3, 1960	Chicago Stadium, Chicago, Illinois, U.S.
79	Win	49–26–4	Victor Zalazar	MD	10	Jun 26, 1959	Madison Square Garden, New York City, New York, U.S.
78	Loss	48–26–4	Joey Giambra	UD	10	May 18, 1959	Memorial Auditorium, Dallas, Texas, U.S.
77	Loss	48–25–4	Paul Pender	UD	10	Mar 17, 1959	Boston Garden, Boston, Massachusetts, U.S.
76	Win	48–24–4	Joey Giardello	SD	10	Jan 28, 1959	Freedom Hall, Louisville, Kentucky, U.S.
75	Loss	47–24–4	Rory Calhoun	UD	10	Dec 15, 1958	Arena, Cleveland, Ohio, U.S.
74	Win	47–23–4	Rory Calhoun	UD	10	Nov 21, 1958	Madison Square Garden, New York City, New York, U.S.
73	Win	46–23–4	Mickey Crawford	TKO	10 (10)	Sep 10, 1958	Chicago Stadium, Chicago, Illinois, U.S.
72	Loss	45–23–4	Jim Hegerle	UD	10	May 17, 1958	State Fair Coliseum, Albuquerque, New Mexico, U.S.
71	Loss	45–22–4	Kid Gavilan	SD	10	Apr 4, 1958	Arena, Philadelphia, Pennsylvania, U.S.
70	Win	45–21–4	Kid Gavilan	SD	10	Feb 19, 1958	Carillon Hotel, Miami Beach, Florida, U.S.
69	Loss	44–21–4	Joey Giardello	UD	10	Dec 27, 1957	Auditorium, Miami Beach, Florida, U.S.
68	Loss	44–20–4	Willie Vaughn	UD	10	Nov 29, 1957	Madison Square Garden, New York City, New York, U.S.
67	Loss	44–19–4	Del Flanagan	UD	10	Aug 24, 1957	Hippodrome Fair, Saint Paul, Minnesota, U.S.
66	Loss	44–18–4	Gene Fullmer	UD	10	Jun 7, 1957	Chicago Stadium, Chicago, Illinois, U.S.
65	Draw	44–17–4	Joe Gray	PTS	10	Apr 25, 1957	I.M.A. Auditorium, Flint, Michigan, U.S.
64	Win	44–17–3	Chico Vejar	MD	10	Apr 12, 1957	War Memorial Auditorium, Syracuse, New York, U.S.
63	Win	43–17–3	Arthur King	UD	10	Mar 25, 1957	Maple Leaf Gardens, Toronto, Ontario, Canada
62	Win	42–17–3	Hardy Smallwood	UD	10	Jan 18, 1957	Music Hall, Cleveland, Ohio, U.S.
61	Loss	41–17–3	Charles Humez	PTS	10	Nov 19, 1956	Palais des Sports, Paris, France
60	Win	41–16–3	Wilf Greaves	SD	10	Sep 13, 1956	Capitol Arena, Washington, D.C., U.S.
59	Win	40–16–3	Jesse Turner	UD	10	Jul 30, 1956	Auditorium, Portland, Oregon, U.S.
58	Loss	39–16–3	Gene Fullmer	UD	10	Apr 20, 1956	Public Hall, Cleveland, Ohio, U.S.
57	Win	39–15–3	Charles Humez	SD	10	Mar 23, 1956	Madison Square Garden, New York City, New York, U.S.
56	Win	38–15–3	Tony Baldoni	KO	6 (10)	Feb 8, 1956	Capitol Arena, Washington, D.C., U.S.
55	Loss	37–15–3	Johnny Saxton	UD	10	Nov 9, 1955	Auditorium, Oakland, California, U.S.
54	Win	37–14–3	Al Andrews	UD	10	Oct 12, 1955	Dinner Key Auditorium, Coconut Grove, Florida, U.S.
53	Win	36–14–3	Chris Christensen	UD	10	Sep 23, 1955	Arena, Cleveland, Ohio, U.S.
52	Win	35–14–3	Ernie Durando	TKO	6 (10)	Jun 16, 1955	Chicago Stadium, Chicago, Illinois, U.S.
51	Loss	34–14–3	Eduardo Lausse	UD	10	May 13, 1955	Chicago Stadium, Chicago, Illinois, U.S.
50	Win	34–13–3	Georgie Johnson	TKO	5 (10)	Apr 8, 1955	Chicago Stadium, Chicago, Illinois, U.S.
49	Loss	33–13–3	Bobo Olson	UD	10	Feb 16, 1955	Chicago Stadium, Chicago, Illinois, U.S.
48	Win	33–12–3	Sugar Ray Robinson	UD	10	Jan 19, 1955	Chicago Stadium, Chicago, Illinois, U.S.
47	Loss	32–12–3	Peter Mueller	SD	10	Dec 4, 1954	Sports Arena, Rochester, New York, U.S.
46	Loss	32–11–3	Hector Constance	MD	10	Nov 12, 1954	Madison Square Garden, New York City, New York, U.S.
45	Loss	32–10–3	Joey Giardello	UD	10	Sep 24, 1954	Arena, Philadelphia, Pennsylvania, U.S.
44	Loss	32–9–3	Pedro Gonzales	SD	10	May 24, 1954	St. Nicholas Arena, New York City, New York, U.S.
43	Loss	32–8–3	Jacques Royer Crecy	UD	10	May 14, 1954	Madison Square Garden, New York City, New York, U.S.
42	Win	32–7–3	Billy McNeece	UD	10	Apr 5, 1954	Eastern Parkway Arena, New York City, New York, U.S.
41	Win	31–7–3	Bobby Dykes	TKO	10 (10)	Mar 8, 1954	Eastern Parkway Arena, New York City, New York, U.S.
40	Loss	30–7–3	Kid Gavilan	UD	10	Aug 26, 1953	Madison Square Garden, New York City, New York, U.S.
39	Win	30–6–3	Danny Womber	UD	10	Jun 27, 1953	War Memorial Auditorium, Syracuse, New York, U.S.
38	Win	29–6–3	Mickey Laurent	UD	10	Jun 8, 1953	Eastern Parkway Arena, New York City, New York, U.S.
37	Win	28–6–3	Rocky Tomasello	UD	10	May 19, 1953	Ridgewood Grove, New York City, New York, U.S.
36	Win	27–6–3	Jimmy Herring	UD	10	May 1, 1953	St. Nicholas Arena, New York City, New York, U.S.
35	Draw	26–6–3	Danny Womber	PTS	10	Mar 16, 1953	Eastern Parkway Arena, New York City, New York, U.S.
34	Win	26–6–2	Danny Womber	SD	10	Feb 17, 1953	Arena, Milwaukee, Wisconsin, U.S.
33	Win	25–6–2	Marvin Edelman	TKO	9 (10)	Feb 9, 1953	Eastern Parkway Arena, New York City, New York, U.S.
32	Loss	24–6–2	Rocky Castellani	SD	10	Jan 1, 1953	Madison Square Garden, New York City, New York, U.S.
31	Win	24–5–2	Johnny Bratton	UD	10	Dec 5, 1952	Madison Square Garden, New York City, New York, U.S.
30	Win	23–5–2	Mike Koballa	UD	8	Oct 30, 1952	Sunnyside Garden, New York City, New York, U.S.
29	Loss	22–5–2	Johnny Saxton	SD	10	Oct 3, 1952	St. Nicholas Arena, New York City, New York, U.S.
28	Win	22–4–2	Sal DiMartino	UD	8	Sep 22, 1952	Fort Hamilton Arena, New York City, New York, U.S.
27	Loss	21–4–2	Jimmy Herring	UD	8	Aug 18, 1952	Fort Hamilton Arena, New York City, New York, U.S.
26	Win	21–3–2	Mike Koballa	UD	8	Apr 26, 1952	Ridgewood Grove, New York City, New York, U.S.
25	Win	20–3–2	Tommy Bazzano	SD	8	Apr 1, 1952	Westchester County Center, White Plains, New York, U.S.
24	Loss	19–3–2	Rocky Castellani	PTS	8	Mar 8, 1952	Ridgewood Grove, New York City, New York, U.S.
23	Win	19–2–2	Tommy Bazzano	SD	8	Feb 9, 1952	Ridgewood Grove, New York City, New York, U.S.
22	Win	18–2–2	Bobby Lloyd	SD	8	Jan 26, 1952	Ridgewood Grove, New York City, New York, U.S.
21	Draw	17–2–2	Bobby Lloyd	PTS	8	Jan 10, 1952	Sunnyside Garden, New York City, New York, U.S.
20	Win	17–2–1	Phil Rizzo	TKO	7 (8)	Dec 8, 1951	Ridgewood Grove, New York City, New York, U.S.
19	Draw	16–2–1	Sal DiMartino	PTS	8	Nov 8, 1951	Sunnyside Garden, New York City, New York, U.S.
18	Win	16–2	Bob Stecher	UD	10	Oct 4, 1951	Exposition Building, Portland, Maine, U.S.
17	Win	15–2	Roy Carter	KO	1 (8)	May 16, 1951	St. Nicholas Arena, New York City, New York, U.S.
16	Win	14–2	Waddell Hanna	PTS	6	Apr 24, 1951	Westchester County Center, White Plains, New York, U.S.
15	Win	13–2	Ronnie Hopp	PTS	6	Apr 7, 1951	Ridgewood Grove, New York City, New York, U.S.
14	Win	12–2	Al Niang	PTS	6	Mar 20, 1951	Westchester County Center, White Plains, New York, U.S.
13	Win	11–2	Armand Michaud	KO	2 (6)	Mar 10, 1951	Ridgewood Grove, New York City, New York, U.S.
12	Loss	10–2	Herbie Hayes	PTS	6	Feb 27, 1951	Westchester County Center, White Plains, New York, U.S.
11	Win	10–1	Tommy McGowan	PTS	6	Feb 20, 1951	Westchester County Center, White Plains, New York, U.S.
10	Loss	9–1	Henry Burroughs	TKO	1 (6)	Jan 13, 1951	Ridgewood Grove, New York City, New York, U.S.
9	Win	9–0	Tommy McGowan	PTS	6	Dec 9, 1950	Ridgewood Grove, New York City, New York, U.S.
8	Win	8–0	Henry Burroughs	PTS	4	Nov 18, 1950	Ridgewood Grove, New York City, New York, U.S.
7	Win	7–0	Herbert Ely	PTS	4	Nov 4, 1950	Ridgewood Grove, New York City, New York, U.S.
6	Win	6–0	James Burgos	KO	2 (4)	Oct 31, 1950	Jamaica Arena, New York City, New York, U.S.
5	Win	5–0	Kelly Duncan	PTS	4	Oct 23, 1950	Jamaica Arena, New York City, New York, U.S.
4	Win	4–0	George Holzman	TKO	5 (6)	Oct 11, 1950	St. Nicholas Arena, New York City, New York, U.S.
3	Win	3–0	Jimmy Dillon	PTS	4	Oct 3, 1950	Westchester County Center, White Plains, New York, U.S.
2	Win	2–0	Gus Pompino	KO	4 (4)	Jun 7, 1950	Meadowbrook Bowl, Newark, New Jersey, U.S.
1	Win	1–0	Jimmy Garcia	PTS	4	May 27, 1950	Ridgewood Grove, New York City, New York, U.S.
