= Kid Gavilán =

Cuban boxer (1926–2003)

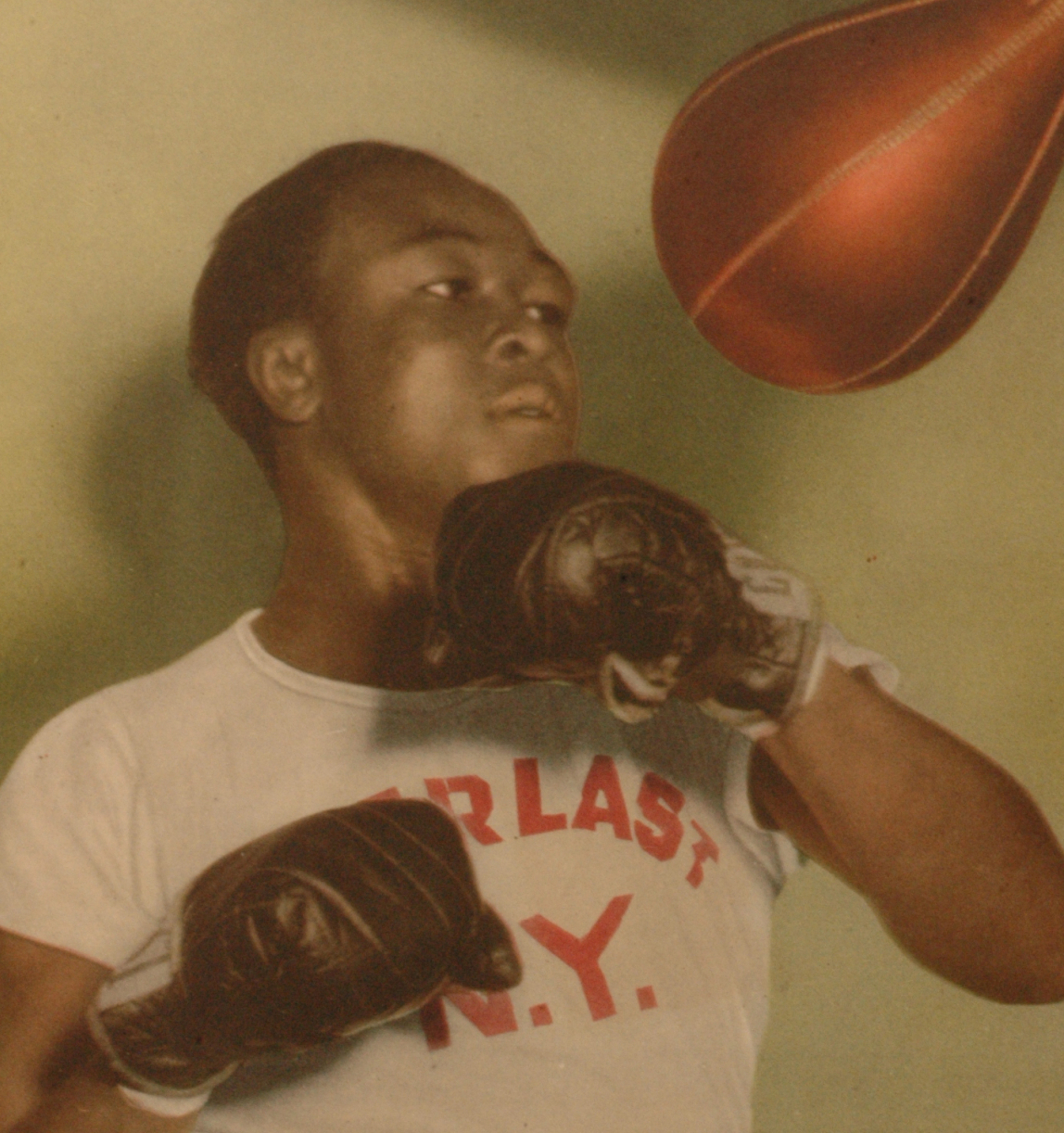

Personal information
- Nicknames: Kid Gavilán; The Cuban Hawk
- Born: Gerardo González; January 6, 1926 Camaguey, Cuba
- Died: February 13, 2003 (aged 77) Miami, Florida, U.S.
- Weight: Welterweight; Middleweight

Boxing career
- Stance: Orthodox

Boxing record
- Total fights: 143
- Wins: 108
- Win by KO: 28
- Losses: 30
- Draws: 5

Gerardo González (January 6, 1926 – February 13, 2003), better known in the boxing world as Kid Gavilan, was a Cuban boxer. Gavilán was the former undisputed world welterweight champion from 1951 to 1954 having simultaneously held the NYSAC, WBA, and The Ring welterweight titles. The Boxing Writers Association of America named him Fighter of the Year in 1953. Gavilán was voted by The Ring magazine as the 26th greatest fighter of the last 80 years. Gavilán was a 1966 inductee to The Ring magazine's Boxing Hall of Fame (disbanded in 1987), and was inducted into the International Boxing Hall of Fame in the inaugural class of 1990.

== Early career ==
Gavilan was managed by Yamil Chade, a boxing manager (based in Puerto Rico) who directed the careers of Wilfredo Gómez, Wilfred Benítez, Carlos De León and Félix Trinidad . He started as a professional boxer on the evening of June 5, 1943, when he beat Antonio Diaz by a decision in four rounds in Havana. His first 10 bouts were in Havana, and then he had one in Cienfuegos, but soon he returned to Havana for three more wins. After 14 bouts, he left Cuba for his first fight abroad, and he beat Julio César Jimenez by a decision in 10 rounds in his first of three consecutive fights in Mexico City. It was there that he suffered his first defeat, at the hands of Carlos Macalara by a decision. They had an immediate rematch, this time in Havana, and Gavilan avenged that loss, winning by decision too. Gavilan had a record of 25 wins, 2 losses and 1 draw already when he had his first fight on American soil. This happened on November 1, 1946, when he beat Johnny Ryan by a knockout in five rounds at New York City.

== Move to the United States ==
He would split his time between the Eastern coast of the United States and Havana in 1947, a year in which he went 11–1–1 with 3 knockouts. However, by 1948 he had decided to stay in the United States indefinitely. That year, he met some very important fighters, like former world champion Ike Williams, who beat him by decision in ten, Tommy Bell, against whom Gavilan won by decision, Sugar Ray Robinson, who beat him by decision in ten, and Tony Pellone, with Gavilan obtaining a decision against Pellone.

After beating Williams twice by decision, he met Robinson with Robinson's world Welterweight title on the line. He lost his first title try, when Robinson won a decision in 15 rounds. Back to the drawing board, he beat Rocky Castellani, the then lightweight world champion Beau Jack, and Laurent Dauthuille (the latter of whom fought Gavilan in Montreal, Quebec). All of them were beaten by decision in 10. In 1950, he went 10–4–1, beating Billy Graham, Sonny Horne, Robert Villemain, Eugene Hairston, and Tony Janiro among others.

== World champion ==
In 1951 after beating Tommy Ciarlo twice, once in Caracas, Venezuela, and Hairston once again, he finally became a world champion when he beat Johnny Bratton for the world Welterweight title by a decision in 15 on May 18. He defended that title for the first time against Graham, winning by a decision, and promptly made four non-title bouts before the end of the year, including another win over Janiro and a draw in ten with Bratton.

In 1952 he defended the title with success against Bobby Dykes, Gil Turner, and with Graham in a third encounter between the two. All those fights were won by decision in 15. He also had five non-title bouts, including three that were a part of an Argentinian tour. His third fight with Graham was his first world title defense in Havana and his fight with Dykes marked the first time that a black man and a white man had a boxing fight in then-segregated Miami, Florida. In 1953, Gavilan retained the title by a knockout in ten against Chuck Davey, by a decision in 15 against Carmen Basilio and by a decision in 15 against Bratton. He had seven non-title bouts, losing to Danny Womber, but beating Ralph Tiger Jones. In 1954 Gavilan went up in weight. After two more points wins, he challenged world Middleweight champion Bobo Olson for the world title, but lost a decision in 15. Then, he went down in weight, and lost his world Welterweight championship, by a decision in 15 to Johnny Saxton. That same year, he appeared on a Telemundo Puerto Rico poster that promoted that country's first television transmission.

== Personal life ==
Gavilan's wife, Leonor, gave birth to their daughters, Elena 1950, Victoria 1954, and son Gerardo in 1953. After retiring from boxing Gavilán became one of Jehovah's Witnesses and was jailed under the Castro regime for preaching. In the 1980s he made a living selling sausages in Chicago.

== Later career and retirement ==
From that point until 1958, when he retired, he had a career of ups and downs. He lost to Dykes, Jones, Eduardo Lausse, former world champion Tony DeMarco, Vince Martinez and Gaspar Ortega, but he also beat Ortega, Jones and Chico Vejar, among others. After losing to Yama Bahama by decision in ten on June 18, 1958, he never fought again, announcing his retirement on September 11 of that year. Gavilan was never knocked out in his professional career. He had a record of 107 wins, 30 losses and 6 draws, with one no contest and 27 wins by knockout in a career that spanned 143 professional fights.

== Death ==
On February 13, 2003, Gavilan died in Miami, Florida of a heart attack at the age of 77.

== Professional boxing record ==
143 fights	108 wins	30 losses
By knockout	28	0
By decision	80	30
Draws	5	

No.	Result	Record	Opponent	Type	Round	Date	Location	Notes
143	Loss	108–30–5	Yama Bahama	UD	10	Jun 18, 1958	Auditorium, Miami Beach, Florida, U.S.	
142	Win	108–29–5	Ralph Jones	SD	10	Apr 4, 1958	Arena, Philadelphia, Pennsylvania, U.S.	
141	Loss	107–29–5	Ralph Jones	SD	10	Feb 19, 1958	Carillon Hotel, Miami Beach, Florida, U.S.	
140	Win	107–28–5	Walter Byars	UD	10	Nov 20, 1957	Chicago Stadium, Chicago, Illinois, U.S.	
139	Loss	106–28–5	Gaspar Ortega	SD	12	Oct 22, 1957	Wrigley Field, Los Angeles, California, U.S.	
138	Win	106–27–5	Gaspar Ortega	UD	10	Jul 31, 1957	Auditorium, Miami Beach, Florida, U.S.	
137	Loss	105–27–5	Vince Martinez	PTS	10	Jun 17, 1957	Roosevelt Stadium, Jersey City, New Jersey, U.S.	
136	Loss	105–26–5	Del Flanagan	UD	10	Apr 24, 1957	Auditorium, Saint Paul, Minnesota, U.S.	
135	Loss	105–25–5	Vince Martinez	PTS	10	Feb 26, 1957	Armory, Newark, New Jersey, U.S.	
134	Loss	105–24–5	Ramon Fuentes	SD	10	Dec 20, 1956	Olympic Auditorium, Los Angeles, California, U.S.	
133	Loss	105–23–5	Walter Byars	SD	10	Dec 4, 1956	Mechanics Building, Boston, Massachusetts, U.S.	
132	Win	105–22–5	Chico Vejar	UD	10	Nov 13, 1956	Olympic Auditorium, Los Angeles, California, U.S.	
131	Loss	104–22–5	Tony DeMarco	UD	10	Oct 13, 1956	Boston Garden, Boston, Massachusetts, U.S.	
130	Win	104–21–5	Jimmy Beecham	SD	10	Aug 28, 1956	Palacio de Deportes, Havana, Cuba	
129	Draw	103–21–5	Louis Trochon	PTS	10	May 12, 1956	Palais des Sports, Marseille, Bouches-du-Rhône, France	
128	Win	103–21–4	Peter Waterman	PTS	10	Apr 24, 1956	Earls Court Arena, Kensington, London, England	
127	Loss	102–21–4	Germinal Ballarin	PTS	10	Mar 29, 1956	Palais des Sports, Paris, Paris, France	
126	Loss	102–20–4	Peter Waterman	PTS	10	Feb 7, 1956	Harringay Arena, Harringay, London, England	
125	Loss	102–19–4	Dogomar Martinez	PTS	10	Dec 3, 1955	Estadio Luna Park, Buenos Aires, Distrito Federal, Argentina	
124	Loss	102–18–4	Eduardo Lausse	PTS	12	Sep 3, 1955	Estadio Luna Park, Buenos Aires, Distrito Federal, Argentina	
123	Win	102–17–4	Juan Bautista Burgues	KO	7 (10)	Aug 13, 1955	Palacio Peñarol, Montevideo, Uruguay	
122	Win	101–17–4	Cirilo Gil	PTS	10	Jul 24, 1955	Estadio Luna Park, Buenos Aires, Distrito Federal, Argentina	
121	Win	100–17–4	Luigi Cemulini	KO	3 (10)	Jun 2, 1955	Arena, Santa Clara, Cuba	
120	Loss	99–17–4	Bobby Dykes	UD	10	Mar 16, 1955	Miami Stadium, Miami, Florida, U.S.	
119	Loss	99–16–4	Hector Constance	UD	10	Feb 23, 1955	Auditorium, Miami Beach, Florida, U.S.	
118	Win	99–15–4	Ernie Durando	SD	10	Feb 4, 1955	Madison Square Garden, New York City, New York, U.S.	
117	Loss	98–15–4	Johnny Saxton	UD	15	Oct 20, 1954	Convention Hall, Philadelphia, Pennsylvania, U.S.	Lost NYSAC, NBA, and The Ring welterweight titles
116	Loss	98–14–4	Bobo Olson	MD	15	Apr 2, 1954	Chicago Stadium, Chicago, Illinois, U.S.	For NYSAC, NBA, and The Ring middleweight titles
115	Win	98–13–4	Livio Minelli	UD	10	Mar 8, 1954	Boston Garden, Boston, Massachusetts, U.S.	
114	Win	97–13–4	Johnny Cunningham	UD	10	Feb 23, 1954	Auditorium, Miami Beach, Florida, U.S.	
113	Win	96–13–4	Johnny Bratton	UD	15	Nov 13, 1953	Chicago Stadium, Chicago, Illinois, U.S.	Retained NYSAC, NBA, and The Ring welterweight titles
112	Win	95–13–4	Carmen Basilio	SD	15	Sep 18, 1953	War Memorial Auditorium, Syracuse, New York, U.S.	Retained NYSAC, NBA, and The Ring welterweight titles
111	Win	94–13–4	Ralph Jones	UD	10	Aug 26, 1953	Madison Square Garden, New York City, New York, U.S.	
110	Win	93–13–4	Ramon Fuentes	UD	10	Jul 15, 1953	Arena, Milwaukee, Wisconsin, U.S.	
109	Win	92–13–4	Italo Scortichini	UD	10	Jun 10, 1953	Olympia Stadium, Detroit, Michigan, U.S.	
108	Loss	91–13–4	Danny Womber	UD	10	May 2, 1953	War Memorial Auditorium, Syracuse, New York, U.S.	
107	Win	91–12–4	Livio Minelli	SD	10	Apr 14, 1953	Arena, Cleveland, Ohio, U.S.	
106	Win	90–12–4	Chuck Davey	TKO	10 (15)	Feb 11, 1953	Chicago Stadium, Chicago, Illinois, U.S.	Retained NYSAC, NBA, and The Ring welterweight titles
105	Win	89–12–4	Vic Cardell	UD	10	Jan 21, 1953	Uline Arena, Washington, D.C., U.S.	
104	Win	88–12–4	Aman Peck	UD	10	Jan 13, 1953	Fort Homer Hesterly Armory, Tampa, Florida, U.S.	
103	Win	87–12–4	Billy Graham	UD	15	Oct 5, 1952	Gran Estadio de La Habana, Havana, Cuba	Retained NYSAC, NBA, and The Ring welterweight titles
102	Win	86–12–4	Eduardo Lausse	PTS	10	Sep 13, 1952	Estadio Luna Park, Buenos Aires, Distrito Federal, Argentina	
101	Win	85–12–4	Rafael Merentino	TKO	9 (12)	Sep 6, 1952	Estadio Luna Park, Buenos Aires, Distrito Federal, Argentina	
100	Win	84–12–4	Mario Diaz	MD	10	Aug 16, 1952	Estadio Luna Park, Buenos Aires, Distrito Federal, Argentina	
99	Win	83–12–4	Gil Turner	TKO	11 (15)	Jul 7, 1952	Municipal Stadium, Philadelphia, Pennsylvania, U.S.	Retained NYSAC, NBA, and The Ring welterweight titles
98	Win	82–12–4	Fritzie Pruden	TKO	6 (10)	May 28, 1952	Fairgrounds Coliseum, Indianapolis, Indiana, U.S.	
97	Win	81–12–4	Ralph Zannelli	UD	10	May 19, 1952	Rhode Island Auditorium, Providence, Rhode Island, U.S>	
96	Win	80–12–4	Don Williams	SD	10	Feb 28, 1952	Boston Garden, Boston, Massachusetts, U.S.	
95	Win	79–12–4	Bobby Dykes	SD	15	Feb 4, 1952	Miami Stadium, Miami, Florida, U.S.	Retained NYSAC, NBA, and The Ring welterweight titles
94	Win	78–12–4	Walter Cartier	TKO	10 (10)	Dec 14, 1951	Madison Square Garden, New York City, New York, U.S.	
93	Draw	77–12–4	Johnny Bratton	PTS	10	Nov 28, 1951	Chicago Stadium, Chicago, Illinois, U.S.	
92	Win	77–12–3	Tony Janiro	TKO	4 (10)	Nov 7, 1951	Olympia Stadium, Detroit, Michigan, U.S.	
91	Win	76–12–3	Bobby Rosado	KO	7 (10)	Oct 4, 1951	Palacio de Deportes, Havana, Cuba	
90	Win	75–12–3	Billy Graham	SD	15	Aug 29, 1951	Madison Square Garden, New York City, New York, U.S.	Retained NYSAC, NBA, and The Ring welterweight titles
89	Win	74–12–3	Fritzie Pruden	UD	10	Jul 16, 1951	Arena, Milwaukee, Wisconsin, U.S.	
88	Win	73–12–3	Johnny Bratton	UD	15	May 18, 1951	Madison Square Garden, New York City, New York, U.S.	Won NBA, vacant NYSAC, and The Ring welterweight titles
87	Win	72–12–3	Aldo Minelli	UD	10	Apr 20, 1951	St. Nicholas Arena, New York City, New York, U.S.	
86	Win	71–12–3	Gene Hairston	UD	10	Mar 30, 1951	Madison Square Garden, New York City, New York, U.S.	
85	Win	70–12–3	Tommy Ciarlo	TKO	8 (10)	Mar 10, 1951	Palacio de Deportes, Havana, Cuba	
84	Win	69–12–3	Tommy Ciarlo	PTS	10	Feb 19, 1951	Caracas, Venezuela	
83	Win	68–12–3	Paddy Young	MD	10	Jan 26, 1951	Madison Square Garden, New York City, New York, U.S.	
82	Win	67–12–3	Joe Miceli	SD	10	Dec 22, 1950	Madison Square Garden, New York City, New York, U.S.	
81	Win	66–12–3	Tony Janiro	UD	10	Dec 4, 1950	Arena, Cleveland, Ohio, U.S.	
80	Win	65–12–3	Billy Graham	MD	10	Nov 17, 1950	Madison Square Garden, New York City, New York, U.S.	
79	Loss	64–12–3	Gene Hairston	SD	10	Oct 30, 1950	Watres Armory, Scranton, Pennsylvania, U.S.	
78	Draw	64–11–3	Tommy Ciarlo	PTS	10	Oct 23, 1950	Arena, New Haven, Connecticut, U.S.	
77	Win	64–11–2	Johnny Greco	KO	6 (10)	Aug 16, 1950	Municipal Stadium, Omaha, Nebraska, U.S.	
76	Win	63–11–2	Phil Burton	PTS	10	Jul 13, 1950	Delormier Stadium, Montreal, Quebec, Canada	
75	Win	62–11–2	Sonny Horne	PTS	10	Jul 3, 1950	Coney Island Velodrome, Brooklyn, New York City, New York, U.S.	
74	Win	61–11–2	Bobby Mann	PTS	10	Jun 19, 1950	Auditorium, Hartford, Connecticut, U.S.	
73	Win	60–11–2	Mike Koballa	UD	10	Jun 8, 1950	Dexter Park Arena, Woodhaven, Queens, New York City, New York, U.S.	
72	Win	59–11–2	Georgie Small	UD	10	May 26, 1950	Madison Square Garden, New York City, New York, U.S.	
71	Loss	58–11–2	George Costner	MD	10	May 8, 1950	Arena, Philadelphia, Pennsylvania, U.S.	
70	Loss	58–10–2	Robert Villemain	SD	10	Mar 20, 1950	Forum, Montreal, Quebec, Canada	
69	Win	58–9–2	Otis Graham	SD	10	Mar 6, 1950	Arena, Philadelphia, Pennsylvania, U.S.	
68	Loss	57–9–2	Billy Graham	SD	10	Feb 10, 1950	Madison Square Garden, New York City, New York, U.S.	
67	Win	57–8–2	Bobby Lee	PTS	10	Dec 17, 1949	Gran Estadio de La Habana, Havana, Cuba	
66	Win	56–8–2	Laurent Dauthuille	UD	10	Nov 21, 1949	Forum, Montreal, Quebec, Canada	
65	Loss	55–8–2	Lester Felton	SD	10	Oct 21, 1949	Olympia Stadium, Detroit, Michigan, U.S.	
64	Win	55–7–2	Beau Jack	UD	10	Oct 14, 1949	Chicago Stadium, Chicago, Illinois, U.S.	
63	Win	54–7–2	Rocky Castellani	UD	10	Sep 9, 1949	Madison Square Garden, New York City, New York, U.S.	
62	Loss	53–7–2	Sugar Ray Robinson	UD	15	Jul 11, 1949	Municipal Stadium, Philadelphia, Pennsylvania, U.S.	For NYSAC, NBA and The Ring welterweight titles
61	Win	53–6–2	Cliff Hart	TKO	2 (10)	Jun 2, 1949	MacArthur Stadium, Syracuse, New York, U.S.	
60	Win	52–6–2	Al Priest	UD	10	May 2, 1949	Boston Garden, Boston, Massachusetts, U.S.	
59	Win	51–6–2	Ike Williams	UD	10	Apr 1, 1949	Madison Square Garden, New York City, New York, U.S.	
58	Win	50–6–2	Ike Williams	MD	10	Jan 28, 1949	Madison Square Garden, New York City, New York, U.S.	
57	Win	49–6–2	Abdeslam ben Buker	PTS	10	Dec 11, 1948	Palacio de Deportes, Havana, Cuba	
56	Win	48–6–2	Tony Pellone	UD	10	Nov 12, 1948	Madison Square Garden, New York City, New York, U.S.	
55	Win	47–6–2	Vinnie Rossano	TKO	6 (10)	Oct 21, 1948	Yankee Stadium, Bronx, New York City, New York, U.S.	
54	Loss	46–6–2	Sugar Ray Robinson	UD	10	Sep 23, 1948	Yankee Stadium, Bronx, New York City, New York, U.S.	
53	Win	46–5–2	Buster Tyler	UD	10	Aug 12, 1948	Madison Square Garden, New York City, New York, U.S.	
52	Win	45–5–2	Roman Alvarez	UD	10	Jul 22, 1948	Madison Square Garden, New York City, New York, U.S.	
51	Win	44–5–2	Rocco Rossano	KO	1 (10)	May 28, 1948	Madison Square Garden, New York City, New York, U.S.	
50	Win	43–5–2	Tommy Bell	SD	10	Apr 26, 1948	Arena, Philadelphia, Pennsylvania, U.S.	
49	Loss	42–5–2	Doug Ratford	UD	10	Apr 13, 1948	Broadway Arena, Brooklyn, New York City, New York, U.S.	
48	Loss	42–4–2	Ike Williams	UD	10	Feb 27, 1948	Madison Square Garden, New York City, New York, U.S.	
47	Win	42–3–2	Vinnie Rossano	UD	10	Feb 13, 1948	Madison Square Garden, New York City, New York, U.S.	
46	Win	41–3–2	Joe Curcio	TKO	2 (10)	Jan 23, 1948	St. Nicholas Arena, New York City, New York, U.S.	
45	Draw	40–3–2	Gene Burton	PTS	10	Jan 12, 1948	St. Nicholas Arena, New York City, New York, U.S.	
44	Draw	40–3–1	Buster Tyler	PTS	10	Dec 29, 1947	St. Nicholas Arena, New York City, New York, U.S.	
43	Win	40–3	Bee Bee Wright	TKO	10 (10)	Nov 3, 1947	Coliseum, Baltimore, Maryland, U.S.	
42	Win	39–3	Billy Nixon	UD	8	Oct 23, 1947	Metropolitan Opera House, Philadelphia, Pennsylvania, U.S.	
41	Win	38–3	Billy Justine	UD	8	Sep 18, 1947	Metropolitan Opera House, Philadelphia, Pennsylvania, U.S.	
40	Win	37–3	Charley Milan	TKO	1 (10)	Sep 15, 1947	Coliseum, Baltimore, Maryland, U.S.	
39	Loss	36–3	Doug Ratford	PTS	10	Sep 2, 1947	Meadowbrook Bowl, Newark, New Jersey, U.S.	
38	Win	36–2	Bobby Lee	UD	10	Aug 18, 1947	Coliseum, Baltimore, Maryland, U.S.	
37	Win	35–2	Charley Williams	KO	2 (10)	Aug 11, 1947	Meadowbrook Bowl, Newark, New Jersey, U.S.	
36	Win	34–2	Vince Gambill	KO	2 (10)	Apr 26, 1947	Palacio de Deportes, Havana, Cuba	
35	Win	33–2	Nick Moran	PTS	10	Mar 12, 1947	Palacio de Deportes, Havana, Cuba	
34	Win	32–2	Baby Coullimber	PTS	10	Feb 22, 1947	Palacio de Deportes, Havana, Cuba	
33	Win	31–2	Jose Garvia Alvarez	PTS	10	Feb 8, 1947	Palacio de Deportes, Havana, Cuba	
32	Win	30–2	Julio Pedroso	PTS	10	Jan 25, 1947	Palacio de Deportes, Havana, Cuba	
31	Win	29–2	Johnny Williams	PTS	10	Dec 13, 1946	Madison Square Garden, New York City, New York, U.S.	
30	Win	28–2	Johnny Williams	UD	10	Dec 2, 1946	St. Nicholas Arena, New York City, New York, U.S.	
29	Win	27–2	Johnny Ryan	TKO	5 (6)	Nov 1, 1946	Madison Square Garden, New York City, New York, U.S.	
28	Win	26–2	Hankin Barrow	PTS	10	Sep 7, 1946	Palacio de Deportes, Havana, Cuba	
27	Win	25–2	Jack Larrimore	KO	3 (10)	Aug 24, 1946	Palacio de Deportes, Havana, Cuba	
26	Win	24–2	Hankin Barrow	KO	7 (10)	Aug 3, 1946	Palacio de Deportes, Havana, Cuba	
25	Win	23–2	Chico Varona	PTS	10	Jun 22, 1946	Palacio de Deportes, Havana, Cuba	
24	Loss	22–2	Tony Mar	PTS	10	May 4, 1946	Plaza de Toros La Condesa, Mexico City, Distrito Federal, Mexico	
23	Win	22–1	Santiago Sosa	PTS	10	Mar 9, 1946	Palacio de Deportes, Havana, Cuba	
22	Win	21–1	Jose Zorilla	KO	4 (10)	Mar 2, 1946	Bayamo, Cuba	
21	Win	20–1	Kid Bururu	PTS	10	Feb 9, 1946	Palacio de Deportes, Havana, Cuba	
20	Win	19–1	Kid Bururu	PTS	10	Jan 26, 1946	Palacio de Deportes, Havana, Cuba	
19	Win	18–1	Johnny Suarez	PTS	10	Nov 17, 1945	Palacio de Deportes, Havana, Cuba	
18	Win	17–1	Carlos Malacara	PTS	10	Nov 3, 1945	Palacio de Deportes, Havana, Cuba	
17	Loss	16–1	Carlos Malacara	PTS	10	Sep 25, 1945	Arena Coliseo, Mexico City, Distrito Federal, Mexico	
16	Win	16–0	Pedro Ortega	KO	6 (10)	Sep 8, 1945	Arena Coliseo, Mexico City, Distrito Federal, Mexico	
15	Win	15–0	Julio Cesar Jimenez	PTS	10	Aug 11, 1945	Arena Coliseo, Mexico City, Distrito Federal, Mexico	
14	Win	14–0	Joe Pedroso	KO	4 (12)	Jul 7, 1945	Palacio de Deportes, Havana, Cuba	
13	Win	13–0	Pedro Ortega	PTS	10	Jun 23, 1945	Palacio de Deportes, Havana, Cuba	
12	Win	12–0	Julio Cesar Jimenez	PTS	10	May 26, 1945	Palacio de Deportes, Havana, Cuba	
11	Win	11–0	Kid Bebo	KO	4 (10)	May 13, 1945	Cienfuegos, Cuba	
10	Win	10–0	Santiago Sosa	KO	9 (10)	Apr 21, 1945	Palacio de Deportes, Havana, Cuba	
9	Win	9–0	Joe Pedroso	PTS	10	Mar 10, 1945	Palacio de Deportes, Havana, Cuba	
8	Win	8–0	Bombon Oriental	PTS	10	Feb 10, 1945	Palacio de Deportes, Havana, Cuba	
7	Win	7–0	Miguel Acevedo	PTS	10	Dec 23, 1944	Palacio de Deportes, Havana, Cuba	
6	Win	6–0	Bombon Oriental	PTS	10	Nov 25, 1944	Palacio de Deportes, Havana, Cuba	
5	Win	5–0	Juan Villalba	TKO	9 (10)	Oct 1, 1944	Palacio de Deportes, Havana, Cuba	
4	Win	4–0	Sergio Prieto	TKO	5 (6)	Sep 11, 1943	Arena Cristal, Havana, Cuba	
3	Win	3–0	Nanito Kid Dustet	PTS	6	Aug 7, 1943	Arena Cristal, Havana, Cuba	
2	Win	2–0	Bartolo Molina	PTS	4	Jun 12, 1943	Arena Cristal, Havana, Cuba	
1	Win	1–0	Antonio Diaz	PTS	6	Jun 5, 1943	Arena Cristal, Havana, Cuba	

== Titles in boxing ==
=== Major world titles ===
- NYSAC welterweight champion (147 lbs)
- NBA (WBA) welterweight champion (147 lbs)

=== The Ring magazine titles ===
- The Ring welterweight champion (147 lbs)

=== Undisputed titles ===
- Undisputed welterweight champion

== See also ==
- List of welterweight boxing champions

Achievements
Preceded by Johnny Bratton	NBA Welterweight Champion; May 18, 1951 - October 20, 1954	Succeeded by Johnny Saxton
Vacant Title last held by Sugar Ray Robinson	Undisputed Welterweight Champion; February 4, 1952 - October 20, 1954	Succeeded by Johnny Saxton

Sporting positions
World boxing titles
Vacant Title last held by Sugar Ray Robinson	NYSAC welterweight champion May 18, 1951 – October 20, 1954	Succeeded by Johnny Saxton
Vacant Title last held by Sugar Ray Robinson	NBA welterweight champion May 18, 1951 – October 20, 1954	Succeeded by Johnny Saxton
Vacant Title last held by Sugar Ray Robinson	The Ring welterweight champion May 18, 1951 – October 20, 1954	Succeeded by Johnny Saxton
Vacant Title last held by Sugar Ray Robinson	Undisputed welterweight champion May 18, 1951 – October 20, 1954	Succeeded by Johnny Saxton
