= Johnny Bratton =

American boxer

Personal information
- Nickname: Honey Boy Bratton
- Born: Johnny Bratton; September 9, 1927 Little Rock, Arkansas, U.S.
- Died: August 15, 1993 (aged 65)
- Weight: Welterweight

Boxing career
- Stance: Orthodox

Boxing record
- Total fights: 87
- Wins: 60
- Win by KO: 34
- Losses: 24
- Draws: 3

Johnny Bratton, also known as Honey Boy Bratton, (September 9, 1927 – August 15, 1993) was an American professional boxer and briefly reigned as the NBA welterweight champion in 1951. He fought many of the best fighters of his era in the division, earning nearly $400,000 in 83 fights, but ended up penniless and mentally impaired.

== Amateur career ==
Bratton started boxing at age 14 and competed in several Golden Gloves events before turning pro.

== Professional career ==
Bratton was a strong character, contemporaneously described as "flashy" or "egotistical", with his "brilliantined hair and a fondness for purple shirts". He was "instinctively disliked by others" and fans were said to hope he would "get a beating".

He turned pro in 1944 and captured the vacant National Boxing Association World welterweight title in 1951 with a majority decision win over Charley Fusari , fight in which Fusari was down for a four-count in the 4th round and a nine-count in the 10th. He lost the belt two months later to Kid Gavilán (often written "Kid Gavilan" at the time) by decision after Bratton's jaw was broken within the first five rounds. In 1953 Bratton rematched Gavilan for the World Welterweight Title and lost a lopsided decision with scores 85-65, 83-67, 82-68 all for Gavilan. After the loss to Gavilan, Bratton's career spiraled downward with losses to Johnny Saxton and Chico Varona. He retired in 1955 after a brutal loss to Del Flanagan, a fight stopped by the ring doctor because Bratton was cut over both eyes and appeared "dazed and didn't know where he was."

His career record was 60 wins (including 34 knockouts), 24 losses (three knockouts) and three draws.

At his peak, Bratton was earning tens of thousands of dollars per fight, and he spent lavishly, on clothes, cars and gambling. His manager, Howard Frazier, was found to be embezzling his income and had his license revoked for it in 1949. Bratton attracted plenty of other people eager to relieve this Arkansas country boy of his new-found wealth, which - combined with poor financial management, by his father and others - meant that he ended up losing it all.

== Personal life, Joanne and after boxing ==
Bratton was born in Little Rock, Arkansas where his father was a preacher. He had older brothers named Jerry and Lawyer Jr. During the Great Depression, the family moved north to Chicago, where his father got a job as a taxi driver, which meant he was often away from home, and young Bratton grew up without strong family support, as his mother left him to his own devices. He attended DuSable High School, but dropped out, spending his time on the street, an existence that led him to the fight clubs that would be his path to success.

He married young - a local girl called Cleadora McLinn with whom he had a son, Dana, in 1944, but the marriage didn't last a year. Then, aged 18, Bratton met Joanne Jackson, aged only 15, a neighbour of his uncle. They went on to marry and had a son, Derek, known as Ricky, born in 1950.

The rigors of the boxing ring had taken a heavy toll, and in 1955, a few months after his final fight, Bratton was admitted to Manteno State Mental Hospital, where he would stay for eight years. On release, he lived quietly with his mother. He would spend time living in his car, then was homeless, and had ongoing mental problems and related hospital admissions. At times he worked as a farm-hand. When his son Ricky died of an infection aged 11, in Detroit, Bratton was too sick to be aware of it.

Bratton’s wife, now JoAnne Bratton-Jackson, went on to be a force in the music business, specifically soul music. With business partner and later husband Ed Wingate – already successful owner of The 20 Grand club and other businesses, she co-founded Detroit record labels that ran neck and neck with Motown. After Golden World Records, of which she was president, came Ric-Tic Records - named for her and Bratton’s son, Derek Bratton, and Wingate Records. She co-wrote a number of soul records, including "That's What He Told Me" and the flip side "Holding Hands," (co-written with Bob Hamilton, and released on Ric-Tic in 1965, sung by Rose Battiste). Motown owner Berry Gordy sought a partnership with the couple early on, but Jackson counselled Wingate against, and the result was a string of hits and an eventual buy-out by Gordy for around a million dollars, in 1966.

In the 1980s, Bratton was sleeping in the lobby of Chicago's (formerly magnificent but now seedy) Del Prado Hotel, earning his place by running errands and being personable, but not quite living in the present, always a sidestep away from his old memories. By 1991, he was in a nursing home on Chicago's South Side, in touch with his family and "doing all right", in his own words.

Bratton died in 1993, aged 65.

== Professional boxing record ==
87 fights	60 wins	24 losses
By knockout	34	3
By decision	26	21
Draws	3	

No.	Result	Record	Opponent	Type	Round	Date	Location	Notes
87	Loss	60–24–3	Del Flanagan	TKO	9 (10)	Mar 17, 1955	Auditorium, Saint Paul, Minnesota, U.S.	
86	Loss	60–23–3	Chico Varona	UD	10	Oct 25, 1954	St. Nicholas Arena, Manhattan, New York City, New York, U.S.	
85	Loss	60–22–3	Johnny Saxton	UD	10	Feb 24, 1954	Arena, Philadelphia, Pennsylvania, U.S.	
84	Loss	60–21–3	Kid Gavilán	UD	15	Nov 13, 1953	Chicago Stadium, Chicago, Illinois, U.S.	For NYSAC, NBA, and The Ring welterweight titles
83	Win	60–20–3	Al Wilson	SD	10	Oct 7, 1953	Coliseum, Baltimore, Maryland, U.S.	
82	Win	59–20–3	Danny Womber	UD	10	Jun 9, 1953	Forum, Montreal, Quebec, Canada	
81	Win	58–20–3	Livio Minelli	UD	10	May 7, 1953	Arena, Cleveland, Ohio, U.S.	
80	Win	57–20–3	Al Wilson	UD	10	Apr 14, 1953	Ridgewood Grove, Brooklyn, New York City, New York, U.S.	
79	Win	56–20–3	Bobby Jones	KO	5 (10)	Mar 20, 1953	Madison Square Garden, Manhattan, New York City, New York, U.S.	
78	Win	55–20–3	Jesús Portuguéz	KO	5 (10)	Feb 23, 1953	Eastern Parkway Arena, Brooklyn, New York City, New York, U.S.	
77	Loss	54–20–3	Ralph Jones	UD	10	Dec 5, 1952	Madison Square Garden, Manhattan, New York City, New York, U.S.	
76	Win	54–19–3	Joe Miceli	TKO	8 (10)	Oct 31, 1952	Madison Square Garden, Manhattan, New York City, New York, U.S.	
75	Win	53–19–3	Ralph Zannelli	UD	10	Sep 10, 1952	Olympia Stadium, Detroit, Michigan, U.S.	
74	Win	52–19–3	Irvin Steen	TKO	3 (10)	Aug 25, 1952	Eastern Parkway Arena, Brooklyn, New York City, New York, U.S.	
73	Win	51–19–3	Laurent Dauthuille	TKO	3 (10)	Jul 28, 1952	Forum, Montreal, Quebec, Canada	
72	Loss	50–19–3	Rocky Castellani	SD	10	Jun 18, 1952	Chicago Stadium, Chicago, Illinois, U.S.	
71	Win	50–18–3	Del Flanagan	SD	10	May 23, 1952	Madison Square Garden, Manhattan, New York City, New York, U.S.	
70	Win	49–18–3	Pierre Langlois	TKO	4 (10)	May 1, 1952	Forum, Montreal, Quebec, Canada	
69	Loss	48–18–3	Rocky Castellani	UD	10	Mar 28, 1952	Madison Square Garden, Manhattan, New York City, New York, U.S.	
68	Win	48–17–3	Vic Cardell	SD	10	Feb 20, 1952	Chicago Stadium, Chicago, Illinois, U.S.	
67	Win	47–17–3	Bobby Rosado	KO	8 (10)	Jan 28, 1952	Rhode Island Auditorium, Providence, Rhode Island, U.S.	
66	Win	46–17–3	Livio Minelli	SD	10	Dec 27, 1951	Arena, Milwaukee, Wisconsin, U.S.	
65	Draw	45–17–3	Kid Gavilán	PTS	10	Nov 28, 1951	Chicago Stadium, Chicago, Illinois, U.S.	
64	Win	45–17–2	Wilbur Wilson	KO	8 (10)	Oct 15, 1951	Valley Arena, Holyoke, Massachusetts, U.S.	
63	Loss	44–17–2	Kid Gavilán	UD	15	May 18, 1951	Madison Square Garden, Manhattan, New York City, New York, U.S.	Lost NBA welterweight title; For vacant NYSAC and The Ring welterweight titles
62	Win	44–16–2	Don Williams	TKO	4 (10)	Apr 18, 1951	Olympia Stadium, Detroit, Michigan, U.S.	
61	Win	43–16–2	Charley Fusari	SD	15	Mar 14, 1951	Chicago Stadium, Chicago, Illinois, U.S.	Won vacant NBA welterweight title
60	Win	42–16–2	Bobby Dykes	TKO	1 (10)	Jan 24, 1951	Chicago Stadium, Chicago, Illinois, U.S.	
59	Win	41–16–2	Sammy Mastrean	KO	3 (10)	Jan 9, 1951	Rainbo Arena, Chicago, Illinois, U.S.	
58	Win	40–16–2	Lester Felton	TKO	3 (10)	Dec 13, 1950	Chicago Stadium, Chicago, Illinois, U.S.	
57	Loss	39–16–2	Holley Mims	UD	10	Nov 27, 1950	Coliseum, Baltimore, Maryland, U.S.	
56	Win	39–15–2	Johnny Cesario	TKO	3 (10)	Nov 22, 1950	St. Nicholas Arena, Manhattan, New York City, New York, U.S.	
55	Loss	38–15–2	Holley Mims	UD	10	Nov 6, 1950	Coliseum, Baltimore, Maryland, U.S.	
54	Loss	38–14–2	Ike Williams	TKO	8 (10)	Jan 20, 1950	Chicago Stadium, Chicago, Illinois, U.S.	
53	Win	38–13–2	Gene Hairston	TKO	2 (10)	Jan 4, 1950	St. Nicholas Arena, Manhattan, New York City, New York, U.S.	
52	Win	37–13–2	Gaby Ferland	TKO	2 (10)	Nov 18, 1949	Chicago Stadium, Chicago, Illinois, U.S.	
51	Win	36–13–2	Chuck Taylor	TKO	2 (10)	Sep 15, 1949	Marigold Gardens Outdoor Arena, Chicago, Illinois, U.S.	
50	Win	35–13–2	Ramón Álvarez	TKO	5 (10)	Apr 8, 1949	Chicago Stadium, Chicago, Illinois, U.S.	
49	Win	34–13–2	Frankie Vigeant	TKO	4 (10)	Mar 29, 1949	Civic Auditorium, Seattle, Washington, U.S.	
48	Win	33–13–2	Chester Rico	TKO	6 (10)	Feb 25, 1949	Chicago Stadium, Chicago, Illinois, U.S.	
47	Loss	32–13–2	Ike Williams	UD	10	Jan 17, 1949	Arena, Philadelphia, Pennsylvania, U.S.	
46	Win	32–12–2	Melvin Bartholomew	PTS	10	Jan 7, 1949	Coliseum Arena, New Orleans, Louisiana, U.S.	
45	Win	31–12–2	Joe Brown	KO	4 (10)	Dec 3, 1948	Coliseum Arena, New Orleans, Louisiana, U.S.	
44	Draw	30–12–2	Bobby Lee	PTS	10	Nov 29, 1948	Arena, Philadelphia, Pennsylvania, U.S.	
43	Loss	30–12–1	Bernard Docusen	UD	10	Oct 29, 1948	Chicago Stadium, Chicago, Illinois, U.S.	
42	Win	30–11–1	Luigi Valentini	TKO	7 (10)	Sep 15, 1948	Chicago Stadium, Chicago, Illinois, U.S.	
41	Win	29–11–1	Frankie Abrams	UD	8	Jul 19, 1948	Marigold Gardens, Chicago, Illinois, U.S.	
40	Win	28–11–1	Jackie Solomon	KO	1 (10)	Jul 6, 1948	Marigold Gardens, Chicago, Illinois, U.S.	
39	Loss	27–11–1	Beau Jack	TKO	8 (10)	Jan 23, 1948	Chicago Stadium, Chicago, Illinois, U.S.	
38	Loss	27–10–1	Livio Minelli	SD	10	Jan 5, 1948	Convention Hall, Philadelphia, Pennsylvania, U.S.	
37	Win	27–9–1	Phil Palmer	TKO	7 (10)	Nov 12, 1947	Chicago Stadium, Chicago, Illinois, U.S.	
36	Loss	26–9–1	Gene Burton	UD	10	Oct 6, 1947	Chicago Stadium, Chicago, Illinois, U.S.	
35	Win	26–8–1	Herbie Jones	KO	8 (10)	Aug 4, 1947	Griffith Stadium, Washington, D.C., U.S.	
34	Loss	25–8–1	Gene Burton	UD	10	Jun 6, 1947	Chicago Stadium, Chicago, Illinois, U.S.	
33	Loss	25–7–1	Sammy Angott	UD	10	May 16, 1947	Chicago Stadium, Chicago, Illinois, U.S.	
32	Win	25–6–1	Danny Kapilow	SD	10	Feb 18, 1947	Chicago Stadium, Chicago, Illinois, U.S.	
31	Win	24–6–1	Morris Reif	UD	10	Jan 24, 1947	Chicago Stadium, Chicago, Illinois, U.S.	
30	Win	23–6–1	Willie Joyce	UD	10	Dec 20, 1946	Chicago Stadium, Chicago, Illinois, U.S.	
29	Win	22–6–1	Willie Joyce	SD	10	Oct 31, 1946	Chicago Stadium, Chicago, Illinois, U.S.	
28	Win	21–6–1	Richard Polite	TKO	3 (10)	Oct 18, 1946	Pelican Stadium, New Orleans, Louisiana, U.S.	
27	Win	20–6–1	Eddie Lander	UD	10	Sep 23, 1946	Marigold Gardens Outdoor Arena, Chicago, Illinois, U.S.	
26	Win	19–6–1	Roy Cadle	TKO	5 (12)	Aug 14, 1946	Comiskey Park, Chicago, Illinois, U.S.	
25	Win	18–6–1	Bill Eddy	MD	10	Aug 1, 1946	Rainbo Arena, Chicago, Illinois, U.S.	
24	Win	17–6–1	Pedro Firpo	KO	1 (10)	May 3, 1946	Coliseum Arena, New Orleans, Louisiana, U.S.	
23	Win	16–6–1	Freddie Dawson	UD	10	Apr 12, 1946	Chicago Stadium, Chicago, Illinois, U.S.	
22	Loss	15–6–1	Ike Williams	PTS	10	Jan 20, 1946	Coliseum Arena, New Orleans, Louisiana, U.S.	
21	Loss	15–5–1	Chalky Wright	UD	10	Dec 14, 1945	Coliseum Arena, New Orleans, Louisiana, U.S.	
20	Win	15–4–1	Cleo Shans	PTS	10	Nov 11, 1945	Coliseum Arena, New Orleans, Louisiana, U.S.	
19	Draw	14–4–1	Cleo Shans	PTS	10	Nov 2, 1945	Coliseum Arena, New Orleans, Louisiana, U.S.	
18	Win	14–4	Candy McDaniels	TKO	6 (10)	Oct 26, 1945	Coliseum Arena, New Orleans, Louisiana, U.S.	
17	Loss	13–4	Dave Castilloux	PTS	10	Aug 10, 1945	Auditorium, Milwaukee, Wisconsin, U.S.	
16	Loss	13–3	Joey Barnum	UD	8	Jul 30, 1945	Marigold Gardens Outdoor Arena, Chicago, Illinois, U.S.	
15	Win	13–2	Melvin Johnson	PTS	8	Jul 20, 1945	White City Arena, Chicago, Illinois, U.S.	
14	Win	12–2	Melvin Bartholomew	KO	4 (10)	May 14, 1945	Marigold Gardens, Chicago, Illinois, U.S.	
13	Win	11–2	Patsy Spataro	PTS	8	Mar 26, 1945	Chicago Stadium, Chicago, Illinois, U.S.	
12	Win	10–2	Jimmy Anest	PTS	6	Feb 14, 1945	Chicago Stadium, Chicago, Illinois, U.S.	
11	Win	9–2	Robert Earl	TKO	3 (8)	Jan 19, 1945	Chicago Stadium, Chicago, Illinois, U.S.	
10	Win	8–2	Ted Christie	TKO	2 (8)	Dec 18, 1944	Marigold Gardens, Chicago, Illinois, U.S.	
9	Loss	7–2	Ace Miller	PTS	8	Dec 4, 1944	Marigold Gardens, Chicago, Illinois, U.S.	
8	Win	7–1	Gene Spencer	PTS	8	Nov 24, 1944	Chicago Stadium, Chicago, Illinois, U.S.	
7	Win	6–1	Gene Spencer	SD	8	Oct 9, 1944	Marigold Gardens Outdoor Arena, Chicago, Illinois, U.S.	
6	Loss	5–1	Gene Spencer	UD	8	Sep 25, 1944	Marigold Gardens Outdoor Arena, Chicago, Illinois, U.S.	
5	Win	5–0	Ted Christie	PTS	8	Aug 7, 1944	Marigold Gardens Outdoor Arena, Chicago, Illinois, U.S.	
4	Win	4–0	Walter Holba	TKO	2 (5)	Jul 24, 1944	Marigold Gardens Outdoor Arena, Chicago, Illinois, U.S.	
3	Win	3–0	Alvin Jordan	KO	4 (4)	Jul 7, 1944	Comiskey Park, Chicago, Illinois, U.S.	
2	Win	2–0	Larry Wright	TKO	3 (4)	Jun 26, 1944	Marigold Gardens, Chicago, Illinois, U.S.	
1	Win	1–0	Doyle Hirt	PTS	4	Jun 12, 1944	Marigold Gardens, Chicago, Illinois, U.S.	

Achievements	Vacant Title last held by Sugar Ray Robinson	NBA Welterweight Champion; March 14, 1951 - May 18, 1952	Succeeded by Kid Gavilan
