= Johnny Saxton =

American boxer (1930–2008)

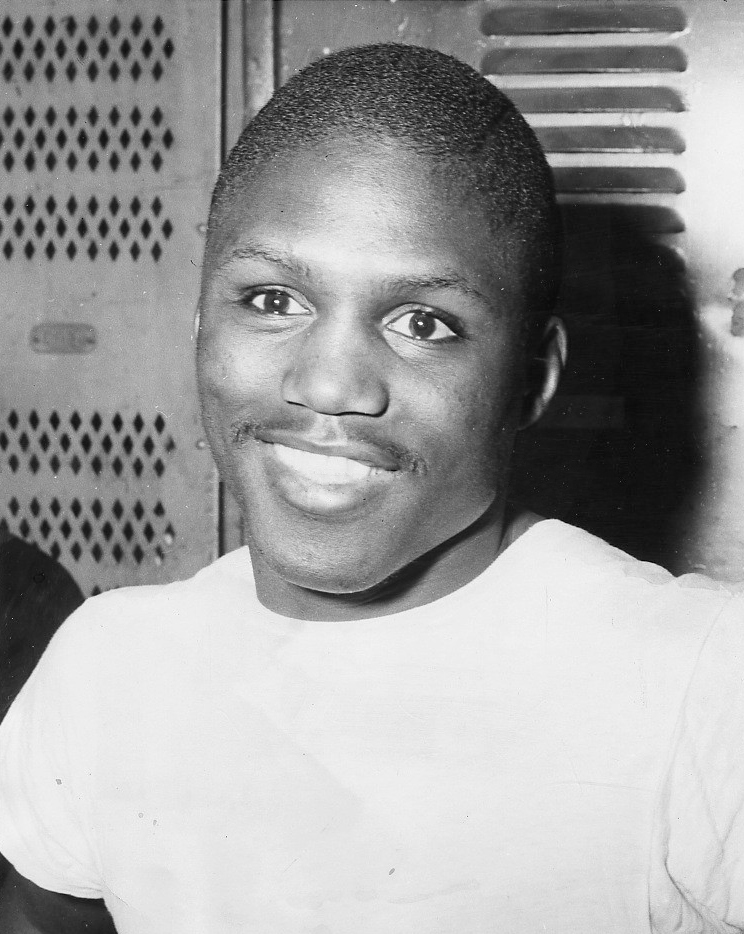
- Saxton in 1956

Personal information
- Nationality: American
- Born: July 4, 1930 Newark, New Jersey, U.S.
- Died: October 4, 2008 (aged 78)
- Weight: Welterweight

Boxing career
- Stance: Orthodox

Boxing record
- Total fights: 66
- Wins: 55
- Win by KO: 21
- Losses: 9
- Draws: 2

Johnny Saxton (July 4, 1930 – October 4, 2008) was an American professional boxer in the welterweight (147lb) division. He was born in Newark, New Jersey, learned to box in a Brooklyn orphanage and won 31 of his 33 amateur career fights. In his professional career, he was a two-time Undisputed World Welterweight Champion.

== Professional career ==
Saxton turned professional in 1949 and ran up forty wins without a defeat before losing to Gil Turner in 1953. His win over Joey Giardello and Johnny Bratton helped propel him to fight with Kid Gavilán (or Gavilan) in 1954 for the world welterweight championship. He beat Gavilan via a fifteen-round decision to take the title. He lost the title the following year via technical knockout against Tony DeMarco. In 1956 he won the title again with an upset win over Carmen Basilio, but lost the title in a rematch with Basilio later in the year. He retired in 1958.

Saxton, brother of Richard Eugene Kyle, who boxed for the U.S. Army, was managed by Frank "Blinky" Palermo, a member of the Philadelphia crime family. Palermo was imprisoned in 1961 for conspiracy and extortion for the covert ownership of prizefighters. Saxton's career was often marred by rumors of shady dealings. His two biggest wins, against Gavilan and Basilio, were both controversial and unpopular with many in the boxing world.

== After boxing ==
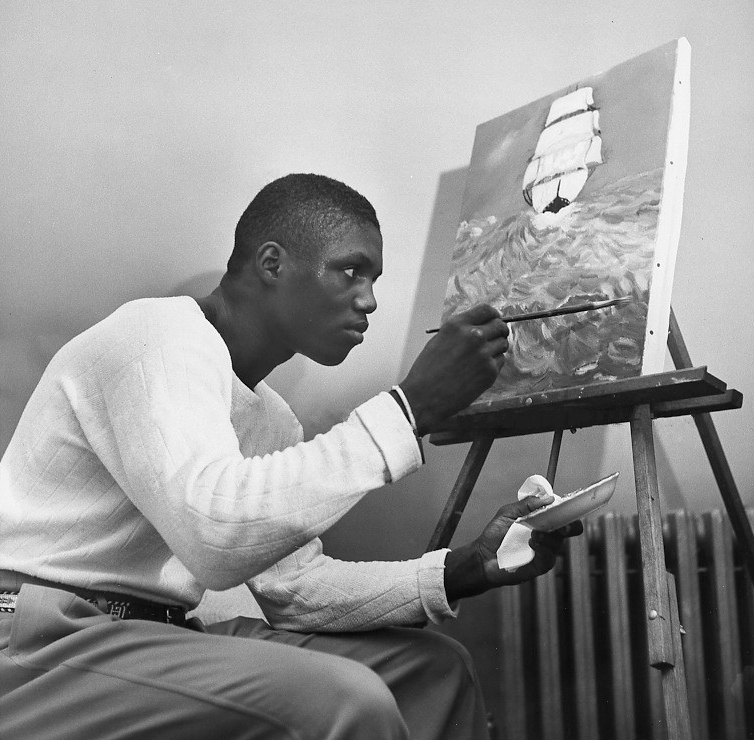
Saxton in 1954

Saxton worked as a security guard and a boxing coach after he retired. A hit-and-run accident left him with damage to one leg, and by the early 1990s he was living in a New York City apartment that had no electricity. A friend helped Saxton move to a retirement home in Florida. He was diagnosed with pugilistic dementia. Saxton passed away on October 4, 2008. He was 78.

== Professional boxing record ==
66 fights	55 wins	9 losses
By knockout	21	5
By decision	33	4
By disqualification	1	0
Draws	2	

No.	Result	Record	Opponent	Type	Round	Date	Location	Notes
66	Loss	55–9–2	Willie Greene	TKO	3 (10)	Dec 15, 1958	Arcadia Ballroom, Providence, Rhode Island, U.S.	
65	Loss	55–8–2	Denny Moyer	UD	10	Oct 21, 1958	Auditorium, Portland, Maine, U.S.	
64	Win	55–7–2	Barry Allison	SD	10	Oct 7, 1958	Valley Arena, Holyoke, Massachusetts, U.S.	
63	Loss	54–7–2	Joe Miceli	TKO	3 (10)	Sep 6, 1957	Capitol Arena, Washington, D.C., U.S.	
62	Loss	54–6–2	Carmen Basilio	TKO	2 (15)	Feb 22, 1957	Arena, Cleveland, Ohio, U.S.	For NYSAC, NBA, and The Ring welterweight titles
61	Loss	54–5–2	Carmen Basilio	TKO	9 (15)	Sep 12, 1956	War Memorial Auditorium, Syracuse, New York, U.S.	Lost NYSAC, NBA, and The Ring welterweight titles
60	Win	54–4–2	Don Williams	MD	10	Aug 23, 1956	Auditorium, Worcester, Massachusetts, U.S.	
59	Win	53–4–2	Barry Allison	UD	10	Aug 7, 1956	Arena, Boston, Massachusetts, U.S.	
58	Win	52–4–2	Gil Turner	TKO	10 (10)	May 16, 1956	Chicago Stadium, Chicago, Illinois, U.S.	
57	Win	51–4–2	Carmen Basilio	UD	15	Mar 14, 1956	Chicago Stadium, Chicago, Illinois, U.S.	Won NYSAC, NBA, and The Ring welterweight titles
56	Win	50–4–2	Ralph Jones	UD	10	Nov 9, 1955	Auditorium, Oakland, California, U.S.	
55	Win	49–4–2	Jackie O'Brien	UD	10	Oct 25, 1955	Valley Arena, Holyoke, Massachusetts, U.S.	
54	Win	48–4–2	Joe Shaw	UD	10	Sep 15, 1955	Portland, Maine, U.S.	
53	Win	47–4–2	Jimmy Fuller	TKO	6 (10)	Jun 10, 1955	Maple Arena, Brockton, Massachusetts, U.S.	
52	Loss	46–4–2	Tony DeMarco	TKO	14 (15)	Apr 1, 1955	Boston Garden, Boston, Massachusetts, U.S.	Lost NYSAC, NBA, and The Ring welterweight titles
51	Loss	46–3–2	Ronnie Delaney	UD	10	Feb 11, 1955	Armory, Akron, Ohio, U.S.	
50	Win	46–2–2	Ramon Fuentes	UD	10	Dec 2, 1954	Olympic Auditorium, Los Angeles, California, U.S.	
49	Win	45–2–2	Kid Gavilán	UD	15	Oct 20, 1954	Silver Bowl, Mount Carmel, Pennsylvania, U.S.	Won NYSAC, NBA, and The Ring welterweight titles
48	Draw	44–2–2	Johnny Lombardo	PTS	10	Aug 4, 1954	Silver Bowl, Mount Carmel, Pennsylvania, U.S.	
47	Win	44–2–1	Johnny Bratton	UD	10	Feb 24, 1954	Arena, Philadelphia, Pennsylvania, U.S.	
46	Win	43–2–1	Mickey Laurent	TKO	7 (10)	Feb 1, 1954	Eastern Parkway Arena, New York City, New York, U.S.	
45	Loss	42–2–1	Del Flanagan	SD	10	Dec 30, 1953	Auditorium, Minneapolis, Minnesota, U.S.	
44	Win	42–1–1	Herman McCray	KO	3 (10)	Dec 3, 1953	Casino, Fall River, Massachusetts, U.S.	
43	Win	41–1–1	Joey Giardello	UD	10	Sep 29, 1953	Arena, Philadelphia, Pennsylvania, U.S.	
42	Win	40–1–1	Charley Williams	TKO	2 (10)	Sep 15, 1953	Fair Grounds Arena, Allentown, Pennsylvania, U.S.	
41	Loss	39–1–1	Gil Turner	SD	10	Jun 15, 1953	Connie Mack Stadium, Philadelphia, Pennsylvania, U.S.	
40	Win	39–0–1	Joe Miceli	UD	10	May 27, 1953	Olympia Stadium, Detroit, Michigan, U.S.	
39	Win	38–0–1	Charley Williams	UD	10	Mar 31, 1953	Ridgewood Grove, New York City, New York, U.S.	
38	Draw	37–0–1	Wallace Bud Smith	SD	10	Mar 10, 1953	Auditorium, Miami Beach, Florida, U.S.	
37	Win	37–0	Charley Williams	UD	10	Feb 24, 1953	Auditorium, Miami Beach, Florida, U.S.	
36	Win	36–0	Freddie Dawson	UD	10	Feb 10, 1953	Arena, Philadelphia, Pennsylvania, U.S.	
35	Win	35–0	Danny Womber	UD	10	Dec 29, 1952	Auditorium, Milwaukee, Wisconsin, U.S.	
34	Win	34–0	Raul Perez	KO	1 (10)	Dec 12, 1952	Madison Square Garden, New York City, New York, U.S.	
33	Win	33–0	Mario Trigo	RTD	3 (10)	Oct 28, 1952	Arena, Milwaukee, Wisconsin, U.S.	
32	Win	32–0	Ralph Jones	SD	10	Oct 3, 1952	St. Nicholas Arena, New York City, New York, U.S.	
31	Win	31–0	Virgil Akins	UD	10	Jul 30, 1952	Chicago Stadium, Chicago, Illinois, U.S.	
30	Win	30–0	Bobby Lee	UD	10	Jul 17, 1952	Veterans Hospital, Coatesville, Pennsylvania, U.S.	
29	Win	29–0	Luther Rawlings	UD	10	Jun 4, 1952	Chicago Stadium, Chicago, Illinois, U.S.	
28	Win	28–0	Bobby Lee	KO	7 (10)	Apr 30, 1952	Coliseum, Baltimore, Maryland, U.S.	
27	Win	27–0	Charlie Thompson	PTS	10	Apr 17, 1952	Casino, Fall River, Massachusetts, U.S.	
26	Win	26–0	Lester Felton	DQ	6 (10)	Mar 14, 1952	Madison Square Garden, New York City, New York, U.S.	
25	Win	25–0	Livio Minelli	TKO	7 (10)	Jan 25, 1952	Madison Square Garden, New York City, New York, U.S.	
24	Win	24–0	Charley Salas	UD	10	Nov 19, 1951	Arena, Philadelphia, Pennsylvania, U.S.	
23	Win	23–0	Marshall Clayton	TKO	7 (10)	Nov 5, 1951	Turner's Arena, Washington, D.C., U.S.	
22	Win	22–0	Honeychile Johnson	MD	10	Oct 4, 1951	Metropolitan Opera House, Philadelphia, Pennsylvania, U.S.	
21	Win	21–0	Tommy Ciarlo	TKO	5 (10)	Aug 20, 1951	Fair Grounds Arena, Allentown, Pennsylvania, U.S.	
20	Win	20–0	Joey Carkido	RTD	5 (10)	Aug 8, 1951	Toppi Stadium, Philadelphia, Pennsylvania, U.S.	
19	Win	19–0	Gaby Ferland	TKO	7 (10)	Jul 30, 1951	Fair Grounds Arena, Allentown, Pennsylvania, U.S.	
18	Win	18–0	Lloyd Tate	TKO	3 (10)	Jul 2, 1951	Toppi Stadium, Philadelphia, Pennsylvania, U.S.	
17	Win	17–0	Tony Pellone	UD	10	Sep 22, 1950	Madison Square Garden, New York City, New York, U.S.	
16	Win	16–0	Sonny Bunn	SD	10	Aug 28, 1950	Coney Island Velodrome, New York City, New York, U.S.	
15	Win	15–0	Mike Koballa	PTS	8	Jun 26, 1950	Twin City Bowl, Elizabeth, New Jersey, U.S.	
14	Win	14–0	Losiel Isadore	PTS	6	Jun 5, 1950	Municipal Stadium, Philadelphia, Pennsylvania, U.S.	
13	Win	13–0	Bert Linam	TKO	1 (10)	May 17, 1950	St. Nicholas Arena, New York City, New York, U.S.	
12	Win	12–0	Joe Miceli	SD	10	Apr 21, 1950	St. Nicholas Arena, New York City, New York, U.S.	
11	Win	11–0	John Bowman	KO	3 (8)	Mar 22, 1950	Convention Hall, Philadelphia, Pennsylvania, U.S.	
10	Win	10–0	Aldo Minelli	UD	8	Mar 15, 1950	St. Nicholas Arena, New York City, New York, U.S.	
9	Win	9–0	Charley Salas	UD	8	Feb 10, 1950	Madison Square Garden, New York City, New York, U.S.	
8	Win	8–0	Mario Moreno	KO	2 (8)	Jan 13, 1950	Madison Square Garden, New York City, New York, U.S.	
7	Win	7–0	Adrien Mourguiart	KO	4 (8)	Dec 21, 1949	St. Nicholas Arena, New York City, New York, U.S.	
6	Win	6–0	Bucky Slocum	PTS	4	Dec 5, 1949	Convention Hall, Philadelphia, Pennsylvania, U.S.	
5	Win	5–0	Horace Bailey	PTS	6	Oct 24, 1949	Arena, Trenton, New Jersey, U.S.	
4	Win	4–0	George Hunter	KO	2 (6)	Sep 6, 1949	Fair Grounds Arena, Allentown, Pennsylvania, U.S.	
3	Win	3–0	Dave Andrews	UD	8	Aug 17, 1949	Jerome Stadium, New York City, New York, U.S.	
2	Win	2–0	George Dixon	TKO	1 (6)	Jul 20, 1949	Jerome Stadium, New York City, New York, U.S.	
1	Win	1–0	Jimmy Swann	KO	3 (6)	May 9, 1949	Arena, Philadelphia, Pennsylvania, U.S.	

== Titles in boxing ==
=== Major world titles ===
- NYSAC welterweight champion (147 lbs) (2×)
- NBA (WBA) welterweight champion (147 lbs) (2×)

=== The Ring magazine titles ===
- The Ring welterweight champion (147 lbs) (2×)

=== Undisputed titles ===
- Undisputed welterweight champion (2×)

== See also ==
- List of welterweight boxing champions

Sporting positions
World boxing titles
Preceded by Kid Gavilán	NYSAC welterweight champion October 20, 1954 – April 1, 1955	Succeeded by Tony DeMarco
Preceded by Kid Gavilán	NBA welterweight champion October 20, 1954 – April 1, 1955	Succeeded by Tony DeMarco
Preceded by Kid Gavilán	The Ring welterweight champion October 20, 1954 – April 1, 1955	Succeeded by Tony DeMarco
Preceded by Kid Gavilán	Undisputed welterweight champion October 20, 1954 – April 1, 1955	Succeeded by Tony DeMarco
Preceded by Carmen Basilio	NYSAC welterweight champion March 14, 1956 – September 12, 1956	Succeeded by Carmen Basilio
Preceded by Carmen Basilio	NBA welterweight champion March 14, 1956 – September 12, 1956	Succeeded by Carmen Basilio
Preceded by Carmen Basilio	The Ring welterweight champion March 14, 1956 – September 12, 1956	Succeeded by Carmen Basilio
Preceded by Carmen Basilio	Undisputed welterweight champion March 14, 1956 – September 12, 1956	Succeeded by Carmen Basilio
