= Lee Sala =

American boxer

Personal information
- Nationality: (United States) American
- Born: Lee Sala; May 26, 1926 Donora, Pennsylvania, U.S.
- Died: December 3, 2012 (aged 86)
- Weight: Middleweight

Boxing career
- Stance: Orthodox

Boxing record
- Total fights: 83
- Wins: 76
- Win by KO: 48
- Losses: 7
- Draws: 0

Lee Sala (May 26, 1926 – December 3, 2012) was a leading contender for the middleweight boxing crown in the 1940s and 50s. His professional career spanned from 1946 until 1953, with a record of 76 wins, 7 losses, 0 draws, and 48 knockouts.

== Early life ==
Lee was born to a working-class family of Italian descent in Donora, Pennsylvania. He was brought up during the Great Depression, with a house full of relatives, including five siblings, and two of his cousins. His father, a bricklayer by trade, worked very hard to put food on the table, even when there were no jobs available. Lee accredits his desire to box to his cousins Bruno and Libro Sala, who were both professional boxers in the 1920s and 1930s, both of whom were top contenders. The Salas were a very athletic family. Lee's older brother Tony was an All-American football player at Villanova University, as well as intercollegiate boxing champion four years in a row. His younger brother Fritz was a baseball prospect in his youth.

== U.S. military service ==
Lee enlisted in the United States Navy in 1944 during World War II. He served on the USS Iowa for two years, and saw action in the South Pacific. During his tenure in the Navy, he won the Navy Olympic amateur championship of north Japan.

== Professional career ==
After being honorably discharged from the Navy in 1946, Lee turned professional. Winning his first bout against Sonny Hope by knockout in round 4. Lee then went on a 47-fight winning streak, finally losing a decision to Tony DeMicco. He avenged his loss two weeks later Lee fought many top contenders of his time, and newspaper articles reveal that he was in line for a title shot on several occasions. Some say that Lee "hit to hard" and that is why those matches never came to fruition. A Washington Post article from June 19, 1948 reveals that promoter Jack McGinley offered Rocky Graziano $25,000 for a non-title shot against Sala; the offer was declined. At one point Sala had outstanding offers to fight both Sugar Ray Robinson and Jake LaMotta for the title. LaMotta received offers from Sala's manager Bunny Buntag upwards of $50,000. Sala was next in line for a title shot against Robinson after LaMotta's loss to "Sugar" Ray in 1951, however Robinson signed to fight Holly Mims One of Sala's most memorable bouts was against Syracuses' Joey Dejohn, who went on to fight Jake LaMotta. Sala was knocked down five times, but in the 6th round, he was able to turn it around and knock DeJohn out, breaking Dejohn's jaw in the process. Sala remained a top-10 middleweight contender for the majority of his career, and finally retired after a few setbacks to big-name fighters such as Carl "Bobo" Olson. Sala had also just married Florida beauty queen Adeline Mondello, and was planning on starting a family.

After Lee retired from boxing, he and his wife had two children. He started working in the whiskey distribution business, and later became a deputy sheriff for the Hillsborough County Sheriff's Office. He lived in Tampa, Florida, with his wife, daughter and grandson, and died on December 3, 2012.
