= Rocky Castellani =

American boxer (1926–2008)

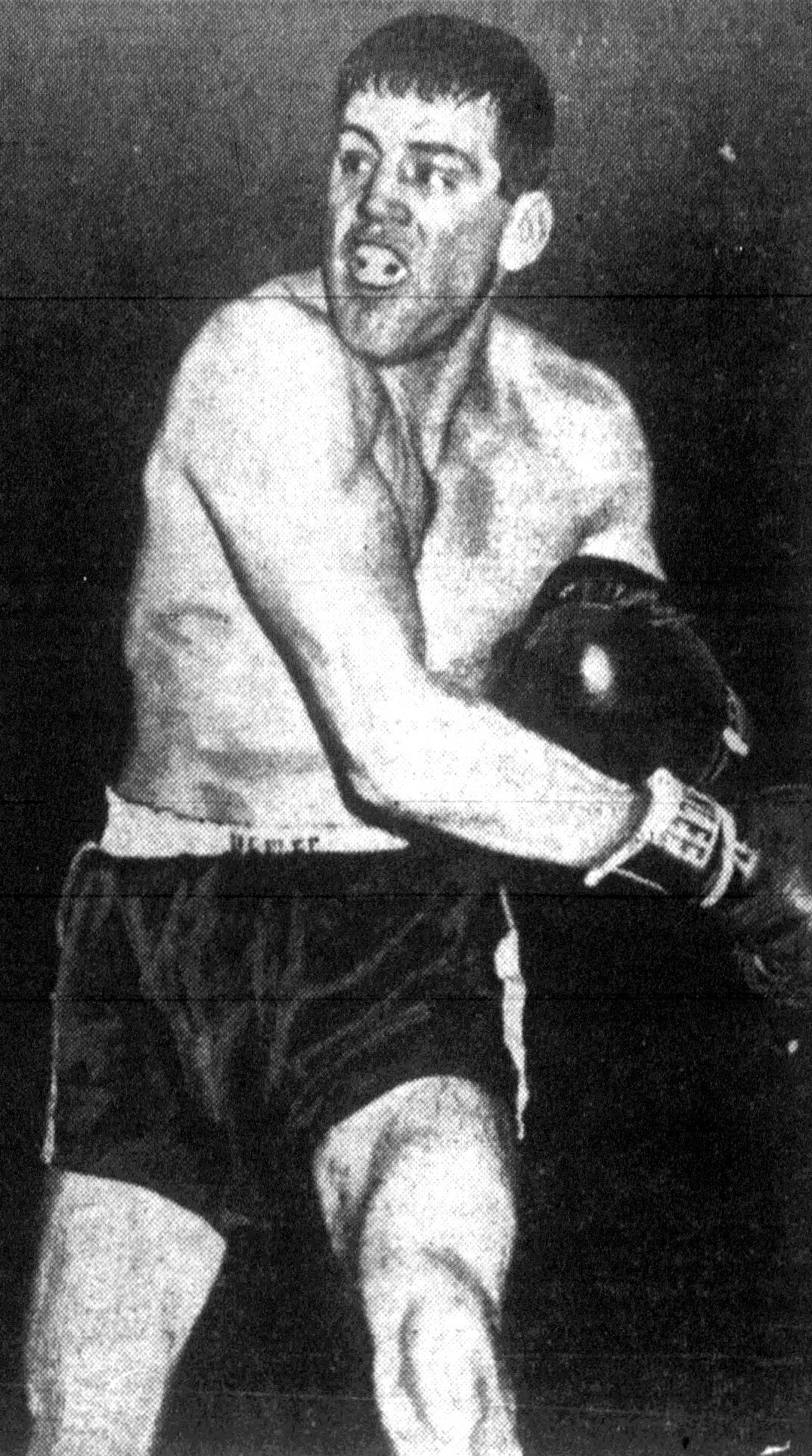
- Castellani in 1953

Personal information
- Born: Attillio Castellani; May 26, 1926 Luzerne, Pennsylvania, U.S.
- Died: August 31, 2008 (aged 82) Atlantic City, New Jersey, U.S.
- Weight: Middleweight

Boxing career
- Stance: Orthodox

Boxing record
- Total fights: 89
- Wins: 69
- Win by KO: 18
- Losses: 14
- Draws: 6

Attilio N. "Rocky" Castellani (May 26, 1926 – August 31, 2008) was an American boxer. He fought as a middleweight and was the top rated contender for the world middleweight crown in 1954 when he fought Bobo Olson, a year later Castellani lost to Sugar Ray Robinson. These two exceptional fights were featured on ESPN's "Classic Fights of the Century".

Castellani was born in Luzerne County, Pennsylvania, to Attilio Castellani (1889–1974) and Rose Isopi Castellani (1896–1938), who later moved to Margate City, formerly South Atlantic City. He began boxing as a teenager at local gyms, and at a younger age would box opponents to entertain neighborhood kids. As a young man, he fought as a Marine in the battle of Iwo Jima during World War II. He boxed in the Marine Corps and won the title of "Champion of All China and Guam". After his discharge from the Marines he embarked on his professional boxing career around 1945.

After a three-month layoff from the ring on May 7, 1949, Castellani defeated Tony DeMicco before 1435 fans in New York's St. Nicholas Arena in a well publicized ten round unanimous decision. Castellani staggered his opponent in the third round, winning the bout from long range, and defending DeMicco's attempts to fight inside. Castellani was voted Ring Magazine's "Rookie of the Year" in 1948.

On September 9, 1949, Castellani lost to Kid Gavilan in a ten-round unanimous decision at Madison Square Garden. All three judges scored for Gavilan by a significant margin of winning rounds. Castellani was knocked down in both rounds two and three, but surged in the middle rounds despite his hard tumble in round two. Castellani showed conditioning and skill but suffered in points from his two knockdowns. The Associated Press gave six rounds to Gavilan, and only three to Castellani, as did one of the judges.

In a noteworthy victory on November 14, 1951, Castellani defeated Joey Giardello in a convincing ten-round decision in Scranton, Pennsylvania. Giardello would later become an exceptional boxer, taking the WBA World Middleweight Title between 1963 and 1965. Castellani took charge of the future champion between the fourth and the ninth, though appeared to be coasting. He had taken four months off from a rib injury he received during training.

On June 18, 1952, Castellani defeated Johnny Bratton at Chicago Stadium. Both judges scored the fight closely, but the referee gave a larger ten point margin to Bratton. Bratton was a game opponent who would later compete for the World Middleweight Title on November 13, 1953, against Kid Gavilan and who was a world champion.

In his later life, Castellani was a judge who scored many important fights.

== World middleweight championship contention ==
On January 9, 1953, Castellani defeated Ralph Jones at Madison Square Garden before 5,400 fans in an important win before a home crowd that clearly favored Castellani as their local boy. The Associated Press gave the fight to Rocky, winning six rounds, losing three, and drawing one. Only one judge dissented from a voting for Castellani, resulting in a split decision. The win moved Castellani to the second round of the World Middleweight Championship tournament to meet Sugar Ray Robinson for the title. Jones was never able to fight in close as Castellani circled, jabbed, hooked, and threw leading rights. Castellani clinched, armlocked or hugged when Jones attempted in-fighting, and was also successful at backing away to avoid the close shots at which Jones could be dangerous. His ability to backpedal so effectively may have indicated better conditioning than his opponent. There were no knockdowns in the close bout in which Castellani seemed to employ a more effective strategy. The bout was a convincing display of in-fighting defense by Castellani, who claimed he had learned Jones's style by watching his bout with Johnny Bratton on television. Jones' strongest winning round was the fifth when he swept Castellani with sweeping body attacks, and he was down from slips in the seventh and tenth rounds.

On February 6, 1953, Castellani lost to Frenchman Pierre Langlois in twelve rounds before 4,887 fans in a Madison Garden upset Split Decision. The bout confirmed Castellani's standing as the top contender for the title in the United States. Notably, the match became Castellani's exit from a World Middleweight Title elimination tournament. Castellani led the pre-fight betting 3–1 over the Frenchman who had a spotty record and was not well known to the New York fans. In an extremely close split decision, two of the judges scored for Langlois but only by one point. Langlois's strong finish in the final two rounds sealed his victory, and he appeared the aggressor throughout the bout, but Castellani's speed and footwork remained impressive in the very close bout. A critical question was whether Castellani had been knocked down in the eleventh round or pushed. The judges disagreed on the issue, and it swayed one judge and referee Ruby Goldstein's scoring in favor of Langlois in the close bout. Eleven of fifteen boxing writers thought Castellani had won, but the judges who believed Castellani had been knocked down in the eleventh from a blow by Langlois gave the decision to him and removed Rocky's hopes to advance in the tournament. The United Press gave only a slimmest one point lead in their determination of who won the match. The loss ended Castellani's goal of making an immediate shot at the World Middleweight Title against Sugar Ray Robinson, but he would get his chance at the reigning champion two years later in a non-title bout.

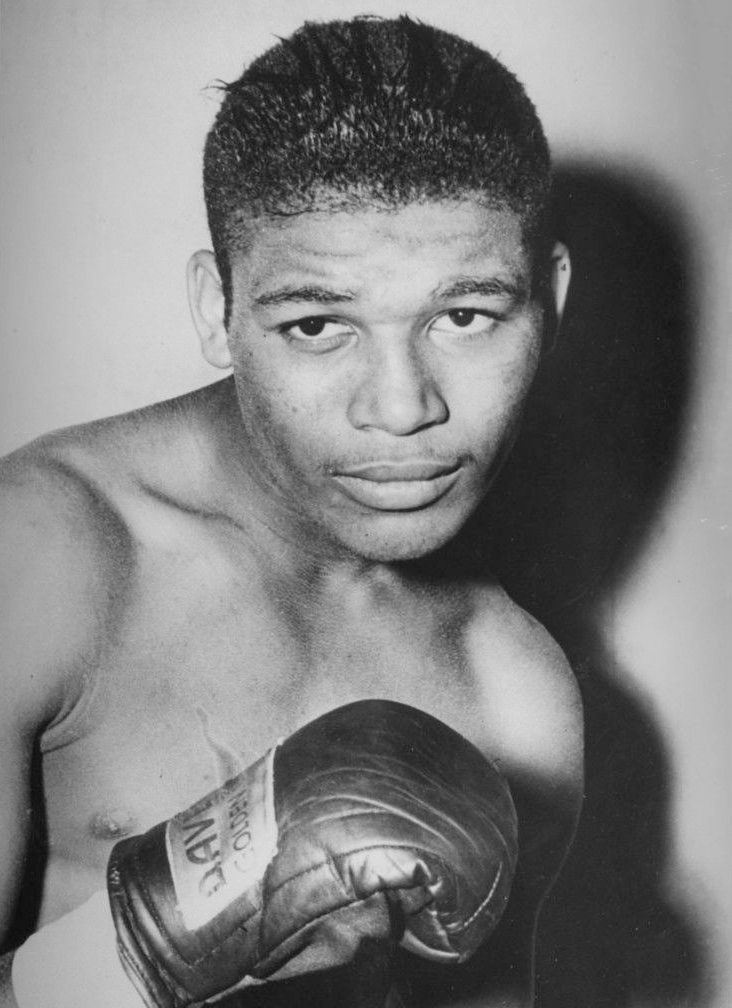
Sugar Ray Robinson, 1947

The highlight of Castellani's career was his ten-round split decision near Hollywood, California on July 22, 1955, against Hall of Famer and world middleweight champion Sugar Ray Robinson. Castellani lost the split decision but knocked Robinson down in the sixth round for a count of nine, though Robinson quickly rose and resumed the bout. After his knockdown, Robinson rallied quickly, leading the bout with furious body punching which impressed the judges. He had difficulty going to the head of Castellani, though he did at times when his opponent occasionally lowered his defense. The thrilling spectacle which attracted 8,230 featured a close contest between Castellani, the top contender for the middleweight championship and Robinson, who would successfully defend his title against Bobo Olson in his next fight on December 9, 1955. Robinson called upon all his fifteen years of boxing experience to win the bout against a skilled opponent who was nearly his equal if only for ten rounds.

A year earlier on August 20, 1954, Castellani lost a unanimous fifteen-round decision before a crowd of 11,000 to Carl "Bobo" Olson for the World Middleweight Title in Daly City. Olson was the World Middleweight Champion from 1953 to 1955. In the eleventh, Olson was down for a three count when his legs tangled with his opponent's, but Castellani was down for a full nine count in the twelfth from a crushing right overhand from Olson. In the remaining three rounds, Castellani, wounded and exhausted, backpedaled and held to finish the bout. The fight was largely one sided in the final three rounds, but the judges' scoring showed the effort made by Castellani to remain in the bout for the first ten rounds.

On January 4, 1956, Castellani lost to talented middleweight Gene Fullmer in a televised bout at the Arena in Cleveland, losing in a very close, ten round Split Decision. Many of the crowd of 1,487, as well as the judges and reporters disagreed on the outcome of the fight. Two of the judges gave the bout to Fullmer by a margin of only three points or less, with one judge dissenting. The Associated Press disagreed with the official ruling, giving the fight to Castellani by a close margin of 97–93. The United Press gave the close bout to Fullmer, however, by a score of 98–91. Fullmer may have won the bout by taking the lead in the boxing, while Castellani continuously countered and defended many of Fullmer's blows. Fullmer established a hit and hold technique that helped him win the infighting by a shade. When Castellani went to the inside, Fullmer frequently landed blows to Castellani's mid-section, usually with his left. In the late sixth, Fullmer took the lead opening a gash on Fullmer, and then pounded what was already his aching mid-section to take the seventh, his best round. The tenth was a close and furious round where Castellani may have been trying for a knockout as his only hope, but Fullmer countered effectively to keep the round and the bout close. Fullmer was rated fourth in the world middleweight standings behind Castellani who was rated among the top three contenders for the crown.

On August 3, 1956, Castellani lost to skilled middleweight Joey Giambra by a significant points margin in a ten-round split decision at Madison Square Garden. Giambra in pre-fight betting had an 8–5 lead over his opponent, and proved his advantage in the fight. Castellani retreated constantly throughout the first five rounds only rarely moving to make a punch and unable to face the stronger, and better skilled Giambra. Giambra cornered Castellani in the sixth against the ropes, throwing blows with both hands, with Castellani having trouble. Weakened in the final four rounds, and moving slower, the action picked up.

On December 10, 1956, Giambra defeated Castellani again in a ten-round unanimous decision at the Civic Auditorium in San Francisco. Giambra seemed clearly behind in the first three rounds scoring at long range with left hooks and right leads. Giambra rallied, however, and scored in the fourth and fifth with combinations to the head, making Rocky appear wobbly. In the fifth, Giambra scored with combinations to the face, abandoning his signature left hook. He stayed with the combination, and it paid off especially in the ninth when he dropped Castellani in the ninth for a three count. Giambra felt Castellani had performed better than in their previous August fight. Giambra praised Castellani for his ring generalship that carried him through the final six rounds, after Giambra had pounded him against the ropes in the fourth and the end looked near for his opponent. Though only three years younger, Giambra looked a decade younger than the veteran Castellani in both their 1956 meetings.

He finished his career with a 65–14–4 record.

A biography of Castellani is entitled Young Rocky: A True Story of Attilio "Rocky" Castellani by Joe Kinney.

== Retirement from boxing ==
After retiring from boxing in 1957, he became a tavern owner at Rocky Castellani and Sons in Atlantic City and Galloway Township, New Jersey and sponsored local youth sports' teams. Continuing to contribute to the sport he loved, he served as a judge for the New Jersey Boxing Commission and coached youth boxing.

He was inducted into both the Pennsylvania and New Jersey Boxing Hall of Fame and was later inducted into the Pennsylvania Sports Hall of Fame.

He died in Atlantic City, New Jersey at the AtlantiCare Regional Medical Center on August 31, 2008. He was survived by his wife Mary, to whom he was married 58 years, his three sons, daughter, and ten grandchildren. He was buried at the Atlantic County Veteran's Cemetery.

== Professional boxing record ==
89 fights	69 wins	14 losses
By knockout	18	4
By decision	51	10
Draws	6	

No.	Result	Record	Opponent	Type	Round, time	Date	Location	Notes
89	Loss	69–14–6	Rory Calhoun	UD	10	Oct 18, 1957	Madison Square Garden, New York City, New York, US	
88	Loss	69–13–6	Bobby Boyd	SD	10	Jun 26, 1957	Chicago Stadium, Chicago, Illinois, US	
87	Win	69–12–6	Lester Felton	KO	3 (10)	Jun 6, 1957	Field House, Struthers, Ohio, US	
86	Win	68–12–6	Felix Benson	UD	10	Apr 30, 1957	Kingston Armory, Kingston, Pennsylvania, US	
85	Loss	67–12–6	Joey Giambra	UD	10	Dec 10, 1956	Civic Auditorium, San Francisco, California, US	
84	Win	67–11–6	Al Andrews	UD	10	Nov 19, 1956	Rhode Island Auditorium, Providence, Rhode Island, US	
83	Loss	66–11–6	Joey Giambra	UD	10	Aug 3, 1956	Madison Square Garden, New York City, New York, US	
82	Win	66–10–6	Johnny Sullivan	UD	10	Feb 24, 1956	Madison Square Garden, New York City, New York, US	
81	Loss	65–10–6	Gene Fullmer	SD	10	Jan 4, 1956	Arena, Cleveland, Ohio, US	
80	Win	65–9–6	Pedro Gonzales	TKO	10 (10)	Oct 28, 1955	Arena, Cleveland, Ohio, US	
79	Loss	64–9–6	Sugar Ray Robinson	SD	10	Jul 22, 1955	Cow Palace, Daly City, California, US	
78	Win	64–8–6	Chico Varona	UD	10	Apr 25, 1955	St. Nicholas Arena, New York City, New York, US	
77	Win	63–8–6	Holley Mims	UD	12	Jan 12, 1955	Arena, Cleveland, Ohio, US	
76	Win	62–8–6	Moses Ward	TKO	8 (10), 2:30	Dec 1, 1954	Arena, Cleveland, Ohio, US	
75	Loss	61–8–6	Bobo Olson	UD	15	Aug 20, 1954	Cow Palace, Daly City, California, US	For NYSAC, NBA, and The Ring middleweight titles
74	Win	61–7–6	Pedro Gonzales	UD	10	Apr 15, 1954	Arena, Cleveland, Ohio, US	
73	Win	60–7–6	Phil Rizzo	TKO	6 (10)	Mar 17, 1954	Armory, Akron, Ohio, US	
72	Win	59–7–6	Ernie Durando	UD	10	Feb 19, 1954	Madison Square Garden, New York City, New York, US	
71	Win	58–7–6	Gil Turner	UD	10	Dec 9, 1953	Arena, Cleveland, Ohio, US	
70	Win	57–7–6	Mickey Laurent	UD	10	Oct 28, 1953	Arena, Cleveland, Ohio, US	
69	Win	56–7–6	Ted Olla	UD	10	Oct 8, 1953	Arena, Milwaukee, Wisconsin, US	
68	Win	55–7–6	Johnny Lombardo	UD	10	Sep 12, 1953	Rainbo Arena, Chicago, Illinois, US	
67	Win	54–7–6	Jackie Keough	TKO	9 (10), 2:45	Aug 22, 1953	Sports Arena, Toledo, Ohio, US	
66	Win	53–7–6	Pierre Langlois	SD	10	Jun 17, 1953	Arena, Cleveland, Ohio, US	
65	Win	52–7–6	Johnny Mack	KO	1 (8)	May 7, 1953	Arena, Cleveland, Ohio, US	
64	Loss	51–7–6	Pierre Langlois	SD	12	Feb 6, 1953	Madison Square Garden, New York City, New York, US	
63	Win	51–6–6	Ralph 'Tiger' Jones	SD	10	Jan 9, 1953	Madison Square Garden, New York City, New York, US	
62	Win	50–6–6	Jimmy Flood	UD	10	Dec 10, 1952	Arena, Cleveland, Ohio, US	
61	Win	49–6–6	Vic Cardell	UD	10	Nov 17, 1952	Eastern Parkway Arena, New York City, New York, US	
60	Win	48–6–6	Jimmy Herring	TKO	8 (10), 0:58	Sep 22, 1952	Eastern Parkway Arena, New York City, New York, US	
59	Win	47–6–6	Johnny Lombardo	UD	10	Sep 1, 1952	Eastern Parkway Arena, New York City, New York, US	
58	Win	46–6–6	Johnny Bratton	SD	10	Jun 18, 1952	Chicago Stadium, Chicago, Illinois, US	
57	Draw	45–6–6	Billy Graham	SD	10	May 16, 1952	Madison Square Garden, New York City, New York, US	
56	Win	45–6–5	Johnny Bratton	UD	10	Mar 28, 1952	Madison Square Garden, New York City, New York, US	
55	Win	44–6–5	Ralph Zanelli	UD	10	Mar 17, 1952	Rhode Island Auditorium, Providence, Rhode Island, US	
54	Win	43–6–5	Ralph 'Tiger' Jones	PTS	8	Mar 8, 1952	Ridgewood Grove, New York City, New York, US	
53	Loss	42–6–5	Ernie Durando	TKO	7 (10), 2:04	Jan 11, 1952	Madison Square Garden, New York City, New York, US	
52	Win	42–5–5	Terry Moore	UD	10	Nov 26, 1951	Town Hall, Scranton, Pennsylvania, US	
51	Win	41–5–5	Joey Giardello	MD	10	Nov 13, 1951	Catholic Youth Center, Scranton, Pennsylvania, US	
50	Win	40–5–5	Eugene Hairston	SD	10	Jul 9, 1951	Scranton Stadium, Scranton, Pennsylvania, US	
49	Win	39–5–5	Joe DiMartino	TKO	6 (8)	May 17, 1951	Eastern Parkway Arena, New York City, New York, US	
48	Win	38–5–5	Tommy Varsos	TKO	7 (10), 2:37	Mar 5, 1951	South Main Street Armory, Wilkes-Barre, Pennsylvania, US	
47	Win	37–5–5	Bobby Lloyd	UD	10	Feb 5, 1951	South Main Street Armory, Wilkes-Barre, Pennsylvania, US	
46	Win	36–5–5	Phil Burton	UD	10	Jun 5, 1950	Artillery Park, Wilkes-Barre, Pennsylvania, US	
45	Win	35–5–5	Ernie Durando	UD	10	Jan 27, 1950	Madison Square Garden, New York City, New York, US	
44	Win	34–5–5	Harold Green	UD	10	Dec 16, 1949	Watres Armory, Scranton, Pennsylvania, US	
43	Win	33–5–5	Tony Riccio	UD	10	Oct 24, 1949	Town Hall, Scranton, Pennsylvania, US	
42	Loss	32–5–5	Kid Gavilán	UD	10	Sep 9, 1949	Madison Square Garden, New York City, New York, US	
41	Draw	32–4–5	Tony Riccio	PTS	10	Aug 1, 1949	Meadowbrook Bowl, Newark, New Jersey, US	
40	Win	32–4–4	Tony Janiro	UD	10	Jul 13, 1949	Scranton Stadium, Scranton, Pennsylvania, US	
39	Win	31–4–4	Tony DeMicco	UD	10	May 6, 1949	St. Nicholas Arena, New York City, New York, US	
38	Loss	30–4–4	Charley Fusari	UD	10	Feb 18, 1949	Madison Square Garden, New York City, New York, US	
37	Win	30–3–4	Al Priest	UD	10	Jan 13, 1949	Watres Armory, Scranton, Pennsylvania, US	
36	Win	29–3–4	Sonny Horne	UD	10	Nov 18, 1948	Kingston Armory, Kingston, Pennsylvania, US	
35	Win	28–3–4	Walter Cartier	TKO	7 (10), 1:54	Oct 8, 1948	St. Nicholas Arena, New York City, New York, US	
34	Win	27–3–4	Herbie Kronowitz	UD	10	Aug 2, 1948	Artillery Park, Wilkes-Barre, Pennsylvania, US	
33	Win	26–3–4	Mickey Zangara	UD	10	Jul 15, 1948	Fort Hamilton Arena, New York City, New York, US	
32	Win	25–3–4	Harold Green	SD	10	May 28, 1948	Madison Square Garden, New York City, New York, US	
31	Win	24–3–4	Leo Sawicki	KO	4 (10), 1:51	May 13, 1948	Kingston Armory, Kingston, Pennsylvania, US	
30	Win	23–3–4	Jimmy King	UD	10	Jan 15, 1948	Kingston Armory, Kingston, Pennsylvania, US	
29	Win	22–3–4	Lenny Mancini	UD	10	Dec 19, 1947	Watres Armory, Scranton, Pennsylvania, US	
28	Win	21–3–4	Tony Riccio	UD	10	Nov 10, 1947	St. Nicholas Arena, New York City, New York, US	
27	Win	20–3–4	Vic Costa	KO	3 (10), 1:34	Oct 14, 1947	Kingston Armory, Kingston, Pennsylvania, US	
26	Win	19–3–4	Lenny Mancini	PTS	8	Sep 19, 1947	Madison Square Garden, New York City, New York, US	
25	Win	18–3–4	Billy Kilroy	UD	8	Jul 29, 1947	Scranton-Dunmore Stadium, Dunmore, Pennsylvania, US	
24	Win	17–3–4	Ernie Butler	UD	8	Jul 2, 1947	Kingston Armory, Kingston, Pennsylvania, US	
23	Win	16–3–4	Gene Boland	UD	8	Jun 10, 1947	Scranton-Dunmore Stadium, Dunmore, Pennsylvania, US	
22	Win	15–3–4	Jiggs Donahue	PTS	8	May 13, 1947	Watres Armory, Scranton, Pennsylvania, US	
21	Win	14–3–4	Patsy Gall	UD	8	Apr 10, 1947	Kingston Armory, Kingston, Pennsylvania, US	
20	Win	13–3–4	Chubby Wright	UD	8	Mar 6, 1947	Kingston Armory, Kingston, Pennsylvania, US	
19	Win	12–3–4	Joey Freda	UD	8	Feb 13, 1947	Kingston Armory, Kingston, Pennsylvania, US	
18	Win	11–3–4	'Young' Beau Jack	UD	6	Jan 13, 1947	Coliseum, Baltimore, Maryland, US	
17	Loss	10–3–4	Billy Kilroy	RTD	3 (8)	Dec 18, 1946	Watres Armory, Scranton, Pennsylvania, US	
16	Win	10–2–4	Stan Perrock	TKO	6 (6)	Nov 29, 1946	Kingston Armory, Kingston, Pennsylvania, US	
15	Win	9–2–4	Stanley Miller	TKO	6 (6)	Oct 28, 1946	Watres Armory, Scranton, Pennsylvania, US	
14	Win	8–2–4	Billy Brown	KO	4 (6)	Sep 26, 1946	Kingston Armory, Kingston, Pennsylvania, US	
13	Win	7–2–4	Billy Brown	UD	4	Sep 3, 1946	Scranton-Dunmore Stadium, Dunmore, Pennsylvania, US	
12	Win	6–2–4	Joe Kiddish	SD	6	Aug 27, 1946	Harman-Geis Stadium, Hazleton, Pennsylvania, US	
11	Win	5–2–4	John Stoffy	TKO	3 (4)	Aug 5, 1946	Scranton-Dunmore Stadium, Dunmore, Pennsylvania, US	
10	Draw	4–2–4	Al Harrison	PTS	4	Apr 24, 1944	Casino Hall, Scranton, Pennsylvania, US	
9	Draw	4–2–3	George Henry	PTS	4	Apr 17, 1944	Lyric Theatre, Allentown, Pennsylvania, US	
8	Win	4–2–2	Billy Hayes	SD	4	Apr 10, 1944	Casino Hall, Scranton, Pennsylvania, US	
7	Loss	3–2–2	Joe Kiddish	TKO	3 (4), 2:20	Mar 22, 1944	Holy Trinity Hall, Hazleton, Pennsylvania, US	
6	Loss	3–1–2	Chuck Kinney	KO	1 (4)	Mar 6, 1944	Kalurah Temple, Binghamton, New York, US	
5	Draw	3–0–2	Paulie Wilson	PTS	4	Feb 14, 1944	Casino Hall, Scranton, Pennsylvania, US	
4	Win	3–0–1	Jackie Murphy	KO	2 (4)	Feb 7, 1944	Casino Hall, Scranton, Pennsylvania, US	
3	Win	2–0–1	Ray Murphy	PTS	4	Jan 31, 1944	Casino Hall, Scranton, Pennsylvania, US	
2	Win	1–0–1	Jack Leidinger	TKO	2 (4)	Jan 17, 1944	Casino Hall, Scranton, Pennsylvania, US	
1	Draw	0–0–1	Jack Shea	PTS	4	Jan 10, 1944	Casino Hall, Scranton, Pennsylvania, US	
