= Bobo Olson =

American boxer (1928–2002)

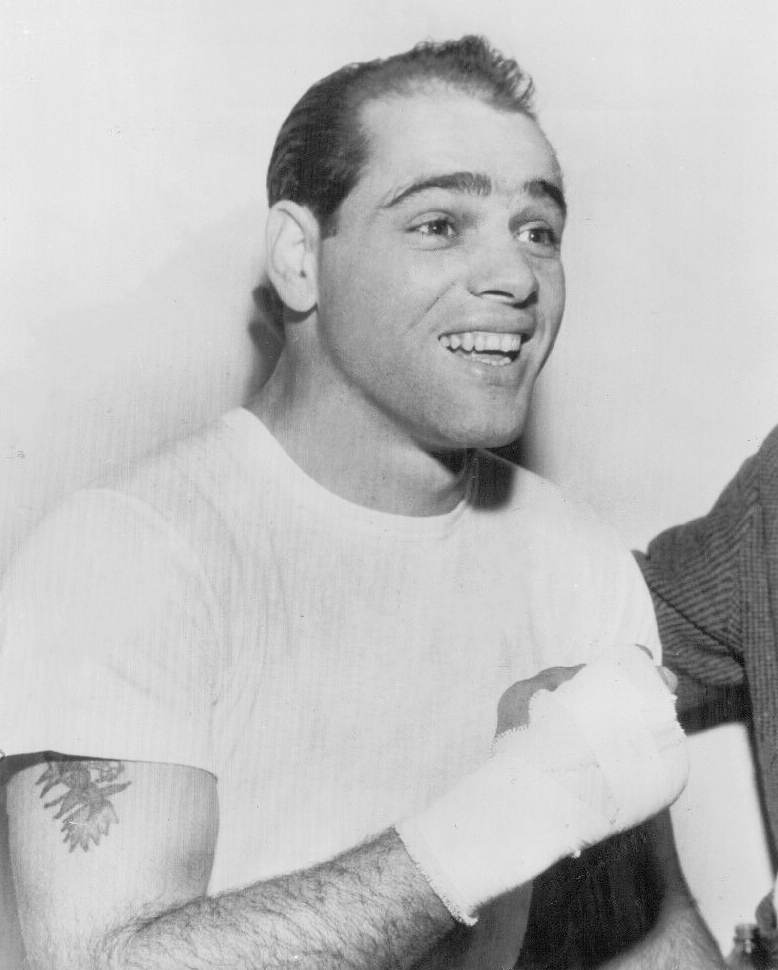
- Olson in 1954

Personal information
- Nicknames: The Hawaiian Swede; The Kalihi Kid
- Nationality: American (after 1959); Hawaiian (before 1959)
- Born: Carl Olson; July 11, 1928 Honolulu, Territory of Hawaii, U.S.
- Died: January 16, 2002 (aged 73) Honolulu, Hawaii, U.S.
- Height: 5 ft 10 1/2 in (1.79 m)
- Weight: Middleweight

Boxing career
- Stance: Orthodox

Boxing record
- Total fights: 115
- Wins: 97
- Win by KO: 47
- Losses: 16
- Draws: 2

Carl "Bobo" Olson (July 11, 1928 – January 16, 2002) was an American boxer. He was the World Middleweight champion between October 1953 and December 1955, the longest reign of any champion in that division during the 1950s. His nickname was based on his younger sister's mispronunciation of "brother".

== Early life ==
Carl Olson was born on July 11, 1928, in Honolulu, Territory of Hawaii, to a Portuguese mother and a Swedish father, hence his other nickname "The Hawaiian Swede". Like many boxers, Olson decided to take up the sport after getting into fights on the streets. Olson received training from boxers who were stationed in Hawaii during World War II, and it was during this period that he picked up his two trademark tattoos.

Using a fake identity card Olson obtained a boxing license at the age of 16. His earliest fights were in his native Kalihi, Hawaii. He had won his first three contests, two by knockout, before his true age was discovered. During 1945, Olson ran off to San Francisco to continue his boxing career. By the time he was 18, he had amassed a record of 13 successive wins (10 by KO). Even at this stage his power and huge reserves of stamina were clear, as was his rather average skill.

== Professional career ==
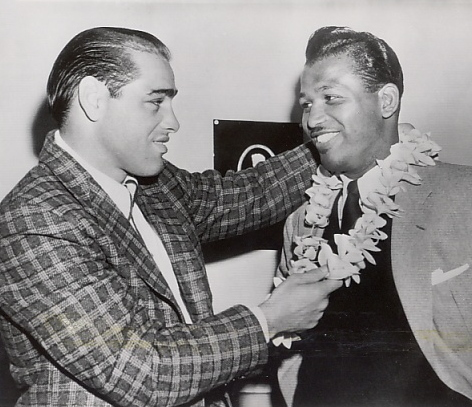
Olson and Sugar Ray Robinson before their 1955 fight

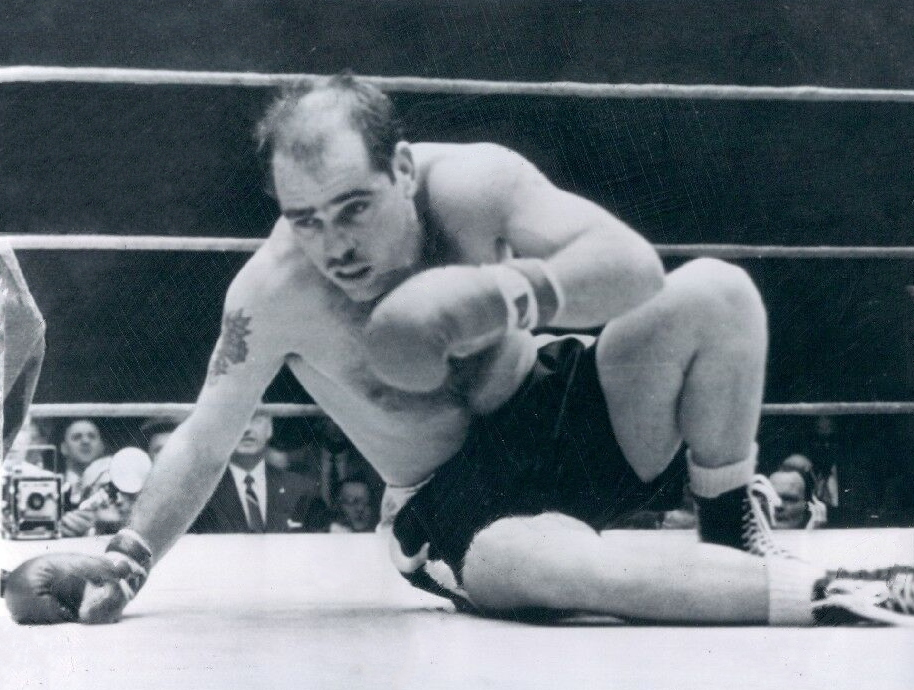
Olson knocked out by Sugar Ray Robinson in 1955

The first real test of Olson's career came on March 20, 1950, Olson's record at this point was 40 wins and 2 losses, against the Australian Dave Sands. Olson lost to a close points decision in Sydney. Seven months after this Olson had his first fight against Sugar Ray Robinson, for the lowly regarded Pennsylvania State World Middleweight Title. Olson, who was widely seen as a slow starter, failed to get into the fight, even though Robinson was not having one of his best fights. Olson managed to hold on for 11 rounds before being knocked out. Despite his great record it was clear that Olson was still too inexperienced to be fighting at that level.

A year after his loss to Robinson, Olson managed to get a rematch against Dave Sands. This fight was the first to be televised coast-to-coast in America. However, Sands once again proved too much for Olson, he again won by unanimous decision.

On March 13, 1952, Olson fought Robinson again, this time for the world middleweight title. Robinson, who had lost and regained the title against Randy Turpin in his previous two fights, was looking for an easy fight. However, Olson had improved significantly from their first encounter. Through ten rounds the fight was neck-and-neck, and only a dominant finish by Robinson over the last five rounds won him the decision. The Los Angeles Times wrote that Robinson won the first six rounds easily, slowly stacking up points, but that Olson reduced the points margin in the seventh through tenth. Robinson won the fifteenth convincingly with hard rights and lefts. This would be the only time that Olson lasted the duration against Robinson.

Robinson retired for the first time in December 1952, vacating his middleweight crown. The top four contenders fought a tournament for the title. Olson defeated Paddy Young for the American title to gain the right to fight for the vacant world title, Turpin won the other eliminator against Charley Humez.

The title fight against Turpin took place on October 21, 1953, at Madison Square Garden. Turpin dominated the first four rounds, he almost scored a knockdown in the first round, before Olson got a grip on the fight. As the fight progressed Olson took the initiative, he scored knockdowns in the 10th and 11th rounds on the way to a unanimous decision. Following his success Olson was voted Ring magazine's fighter of the year for 1953.

Olson won all seven of his fights in 1954 including defenses of his title against such big names as Kid Gavilan, Rocky Castellani, and Pierre Langlois.

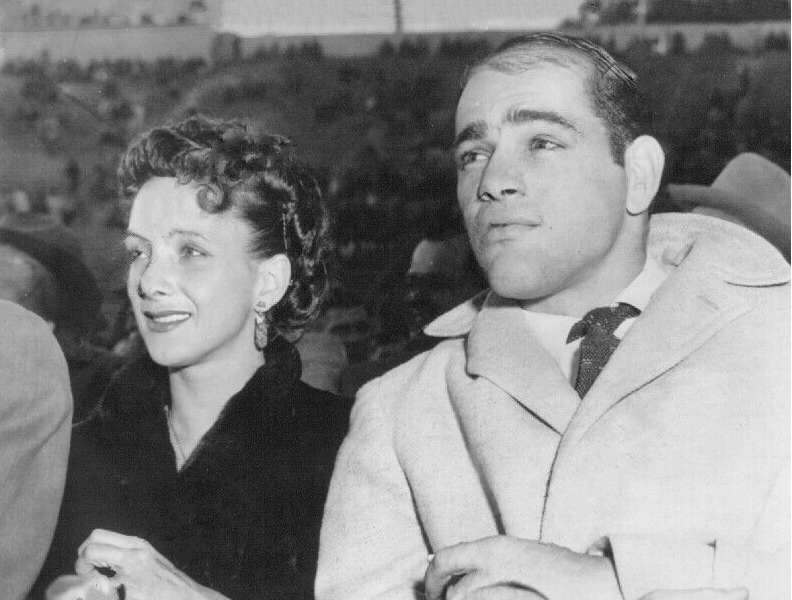
Olson with wife Helen in 1955. They got married in Hawaii in 1946 and divorced in 1955

In 1955 Olson, who was finding it increasingly difficult to make weight, stepped up to light heavyweight. His first major fight in this category was against former champion Joey Maxim. Olson won the fight easily on points after scoring knockdowns in both the 2nd and 9th rounds. On June 22 Olson challenged 41-year-old Archie Moore for the light heavyweight title, a fight that many believed Olson would easily win. However, Moore was too strong for Olson and won by knockout after only a minute had elapsed of the third round. After this fight Olson began his decline.

Following two walkover wins, Olson put his middleweight title on the line against Robinson, who was once again number 1 contender following his brief retirement, on December 9, 1955. It was Olson's fourth and final defense of his title, but ended as a stunning comeback for Robinson. Olson, who entered the fight as a 3–1 favorite, was knocked out in the second round. The rematch, fought five months later at Wrigley Field, on May 18, 1956, ended similarly with Olson going down in the fourth. Robinson ended the bout with a hard left hook to the body and a right to the jaw. Olson had made the mistake of dropping his right hand after Robinson's hard left, dropping his only defense in an instant. After this second defeat Olson announced his retirement.

== Late career ==
After a year out of the game Olson returned as a heavyweight to fight Maxim again, a fight he won on points. Olson took another year out following a knockout defeat against Pat McMurtry. Whilst initially coming back as a journeyman, despite being only 30, Olson managed to reestablish himself as a contender. On November 27, 1964, he fought José Torres with the winner going on to fight the champion, Willie Pastrano. Olson was knocked out after 2 minutes of the first round. This defeat effectively ended his career, he would only fight again four more times, with his final fight being a defeat to Gene Fullmer's younger brother, Don.

== Life after boxing ==
Olson retired with a record of 97 wins (47 by KO), 16 losses, and 2 draws from his 115 professional fights. He went on to work with disaffected youngsters before working as a PR officer for the Elevator Operating Engineers Local Union in San Francisco. In 1987 he was a Union Elevator Operator in Lancaster, California, working on new construction at the Antelope Valley Medical Center.

In the 1990s he lived in Northern California for a time. In his later years Olson suffered from Alzheimer's disease. To add quality of life to his later years he and much of his close family returned to Honolulu. He died on January 16, 2002, in Honolulu at Queens Medical Center at the age of 73.

He was inducted into the World Boxing Hall of Fame in 1958, and the International Boxing Hall of Fame in 2000.

== Professional boxing record ==
115 fights	97 wins	16 losses
By knockout	47	7
By decision	50	9
Draws	2	

No.	Result	Record	Opponent	Type	Round, time	Date	Location	Notes
115	Loss	97–16–2	Don Fullmer	MD	10	Nov 28, 1966	Oakland Arena, Oakland, California, US	
114	Win	97–15–2	Piero Del Papa	SD	10	Jul 11, 1966	San Francisco Civic Auditorium, San Francisco, California, US	
113	Win	96–15–2	Fred Roots	TKO	3 (10), 2:35	Sep 23, 1965	Centennial Coliseum, Reno, Nevada, US	
112	Win	95–15–2	Andy Kendall	UD	10	Jun 24, 1965	Centennial Coliseum, Reno, Nevada, US	
111	Loss	94–15–2	José Torres	KO	1 (10), 2:51	Nov 27, 1964	Madison Square Garden, New York City, New York, US	
110	Win	94–14–2	Wayne Thornton	UD	10	Aug 28, 1964	Kezar Pavilion, San Francisco, California, US	
109	Loss	93–14–2	Johnny Persol	MD	10	Jun 19, 1964	Madison Square Garden, New York City, New York, US	
108	Win	93–13–2	Wayne Thornton	MD	10	Mar 27, 1964	Kezar Pavilion, San Francisco, California, US	
107	Draw	92–13–2	Hank Casey	SD	10	Dec 9, 1963	Auditorium, Oakland, California, US	
106	Win	92–13–1	Jose Menno	UD	10	Oct 21, 1963	Kezar Pavilion, San Francisco, California, US	
105	Win	91–13–1	Jesse Bowdry	UD	10	May 14, 1963	Civic Auditorium, Honolulu, Hawaii, US	
104	Win	90–13–1	Sonny Ray	TKO	7 (10), 3:00	Apr 30, 1963	Civic Auditorium, Honolulu, Hawaii, US	
103	Win	89–13–1	Tiger Al Williams	TKO	5 (10)	Jan 25, 1963	Lane County Fairgrounds, Eugene, Oregon, US	
102	Draw	88–13–1	Giulio Rinaldi	PTS	10	Dec 14, 1962	PalaEur, Roma, Italy	
101	Win	88–13	Lennart Risberg	KO	6 (10), 1:44	Jun 3, 1962	Olympic Stadium, Stockholm, Sweden	
100	Loss	87–13	Pete Rademacher	UD	10	Apr 3, 1962	Honolulu Stadium, Honolulu, Hawaii, US	
99	Win	87–12	Artie Dixon	UD	10	Jan 19, 1962	Civic Auditorium, Honolulu, Hawaii, US	
98	Win	86–12	Tiger Al Williams	UD	10	Jan 12, 1962	Civic Auditorium, Honolulu, Hawaii, US	
97	Win	85–12	Roy Smith	TKO	8 (10), 2:44	Nov 14, 1961	Civic Auditorium, Honolulu, Hawaii, US	
96	Win	84–12	Sixto Rodriguez	UD	10	Oct 23, 1961	San Francisco Civic Auditorium, San Francisco, California, US	
95	Loss	83–12	Sixto Rodriguez	UD	10	Sep 11, 1961	San Francisco Civic Auditorium, San Francisco, California, US	
94	Win	83–11	Roque Maravilla	UD	10	Aug 14, 1961	Auditorium, Oakland, California, US	
93	Win	82–11	Floyd Buchanan	TKO	3 (10)	Feb 16, 1961	Memorial Arena, Victoria, British Columbia, Canada	
92	Win	81–11	Bobby Daniels	UD	10	Jan 19, 1961	Coliseum, Spokane, Washington, US	
91	Loss	80–11	Doug Jones	KO	6 (10), 1:30	Aug 31, 1960	Chicago Stadium, Chicago, Illinois, US	
90	Win	80–10	Mike Holt	PTS	10	Jun 6, 1960	Rand Stadium, Johannesburg, South Africa	
89	Win	79–10	Al Sparks	TKO	5 (10)	May 5, 1960	Exhibition Gardens, Vancouver, British Columbia, Canada	
88	Win	78–10	Roque Maravilla	TKO	7 (10), 3:00	Apr 7, 1960	Auditorium, Portland, Oregon, US	
87	Win	77–10	George Kartalian	TKO	5 (10)	Aug 25, 1959	Memorial Auditorium, Fresno, California, US	
86	Win	76–10	Rory Calhoun	UD	10	Mar 30, 1959	Cow Palace, Daly City, California, US	
85	Win	75–10	Tommy Villa	TKO	5 (10), 1:28	Dec 16, 1958	Memorial Auditorium, Fresno, California, US	
84	Win	74–10	Paddy Young	TKO	6 (10)	Nov 25, 1958	Auditorium, Oakland, California, US	
83	Win	73–10	Don Grant	TKO	7 (10), 2:32	Oct 28, 1958	Auditorium, Oakland, California, US	
82	Loss	72–10	Pat McMurtry	KO	2 (10), 2:34	Aug 17, 1957	Meadows Race Track, Portland, Oregon, US	
81	Win	72–9	Joey Maxim	SD	10	Jun 18, 1957	Auditorium, Portland, Oregon, US	
80	Loss	71–9	Sugar Ray Robinson	KO	4 (15), 2:51	May 18, 1956	Wrigley Field, Los Angeles, California, US	For NYSAC, NBA, and The Ring middleweight titles
79	Loss	71–8	Sugar Ray Robinson	KO	2 (15), 2:51	Dec 9, 1955	Chicago Stadium, Chicago, Illinois, US	Lost NYSAC, NBA, and The Ring middleweight titles
78	Win	71–7	Joey Giambra	UD	10	Aug 26, 1955	Cow Palace, Daly City, California, US	
77	Win	70–7	Jimmy Martinez	UD	10	Aug 13, 1955	Multnomah Stadium, Portland, Oregon, US	
76	Loss	69–7	Archie Moore	KO	3 (15), 1:19	Jun 22, 1955	Polo Grounds, New York City, New York, US	For NYSAC, NBA, and The Ring light heavyweight titles
75	Win	69–6	Joey Maxim	UD	10	Apr 13, 1955	Cow Palace, Daly City, California, US	
74	Win	68–6	Willie Vaughn	UD	10	Mar 12, 1955	Legion Stadium, Hollywood, California, US	
73	Win	67–6	Ralph Jones	UD	10	Feb 16, 1955	Chicago Stadium, Chicago, Illinois, US	
72	Win	66–6	Pierre Langlois	TKO	11 (15), 0:58	Dec 15, 1954	Cow Palace, Daly City, California, US	Retained NYSAC, NBA, and The Ring middleweight titles
71	Win	65–6	Garth Panter	TKO	8 (10), 0:41	Nov 3, 1954	Auditorium, Richmond, California, US	
70	Win	64–6	Rocky Castellani	UD	15	Aug 20, 1954	Cow Palace, Daly City, California, US	Retained NYSAC, NBA, and The Ring middleweight titles
69	Win	63–6	Pedro Gonzales	KO	4 (10), 2:57	Jul 7, 1954	Auditorium, Oakland, California, US	
68	Win	62–6	Jesse Turner	TKO	8 (10), 1:09	Jun 15, 1954	Civic Auditorium, Honolulu, Hawaii	
67	Win	61–6	Kid Gavilan	MD	15	Apr 2, 1954	Chicago Stadium, Chicago, Illinois, US	Retained NYSAC, NBA, and The Ring middleweight titles
66	Win	60–6	Joe Rindone	KO	5 (10)	Jan 23, 1954	Winterland Arena, San Francisco, California, US	
65	Win	59–6	Randy Turpin	UD	15	Oct 21, 1953	Madison Square Garden, New York City, New York, US	Won vacant NYSAC, NBA, and The Ring middleweight titles
64	Win	58–6	Paddy Young	UD	15	Jun 19, 1953	Madison Square Garden, New York City, New York, US	Won American Middleweight Title
63	Win	57–6	Garth Panter	UD	10	Mar 16, 1953	Butte, Montana, US	
62	Win	56–6	Norman Hayes	UD	10	Feb 7, 1953	Boston Garden, Boston, Massachusetts, US	
61	Win	55–6	Norman Hayes	UD	10	Dec 18, 1952	San Francisco Civic Auditorium, San Francisco, California, US	
60	Win	54–6	Lee Sala	KO	2 (10), 2:12	Nov 20, 1952	Winterland Arena, San Francisco, California, US	
59	Win	53–6	Gene Hairston	TKO	6 (10), 3:00	Aug 27, 1952	Madison Square Garden, New York City, New York, US	
58	Win	52–6	Robert Villemain	SD	10	Jul 12, 1952	Cow Palace, Daly City, California, US	
57	Win	51–6	Jimmy Beau	UD	10	Jun 6, 1952	Madison Square Garden, New York City, New York, US	
56	Win	50–6	Walter Cartier	TKO	5 (10), 1:01	May 19, 1952	Eastern Parkway Arena, New York City, New York, US	
55	Win	49–6	Woody Harper	TKO	7 (10)	May 6, 1952	Auditorium, Richmond, California, US	
54	Loss	48–6	Sugar Ray Robinson	UD	15	Mar 13, 1952	San Francisco Civic Auditorium, San Francisco, California, US	For NYAC, NBA, and The Ring middleweight titles
53	Win	48–5	Tommy Harrison	UD	10	Feb 15, 1952	Legion Stadium, Hollywood, California, US	
52	Win	47–5	Woody Harper	UD	10	Feb 12, 1952	Memorial Auditorium, Sacramento, California, US	
51	Loss	46–5	Dave Sands	UD	10	Oct 3, 1951	Chicago Stadium, Chicago, Illinois, US	
50	Win	46–4	Bobby Jones	MD	10	Aug 27, 1951	Coliseum Bowl, San Francisco, California, US	
49	Win	45–4	Charley Cato	TKO	3 (10)	Jul 27, 1951	Auditorium, Richmond, California, US	
48	Win	44–4	Chuck Hunter	UD	10	Jul 9, 1951	San Francisco Civic Auditorium, San Francisco, California, US	
47	Win	43–4	Lloyd Marshall	KO	5 (10), 1:03	May 8, 1951	Civic Auditorium, Honolulu, Hawaii	
46	Win	42–4	Art Soto	UD	10	Mar 20, 1951	Civic Auditorium, Honolulu, Hawaii	
45	Loss	41–4	Sugar Ray Robinson	KO	12 (15), 1:19	Oct 26, 1950	Convention Hall, Philadelphia, Pennsylvania, US	For Pennsylvania State middleweight title
44	Win	41–3	Henry Brimm	UD	10	Sep 5, 1950	Civic Auditorium, Honolulu, Hawaii	
43	Win	40–3	Otis Graham	UD	10	May 22, 1950	Honolulu Stadium, Honolulu, Hawaii	
42	Win	39–3	Roy Miller	RTD	5 (10)	Apr 25, 1950	Civic Auditorium, Honolulu, Hawaii	
41	Loss	38–3	Dave Sands	PTS	12	Mar 20, 1950	Sydney Stadium, Sydney, Australia	
40	Win	38–2	Don Lee	UD	10	Feb 22, 1950	Civic Auditorium, Honolulu, Hawaii	
39	Win	37–2	Earl Turner	UD	10	Dec 13, 1949	Civic Auditorium, Honolulu, Hawaii	
38	Win	36–2	Johnny Duke	UD	10	Nov 22, 1949	Civic Auditorium, Honolulu, Hawaii	
37	Win	35–2	Art Hardy	KO	3 (10), 1:31	Aug 23, 1949	Civic Auditorium, Honolulu, Hawaii	
36	Win	34–2	Milo Savage	UD	10	Jul 26, 1949	Civic Auditorium, Honolulu, Hawaii	
35	Win	33–2	Tommy Yarosz	UD	10	Jun 3, 1949	Civic Auditorium, Honolulu, Hawaii	
34	Win	32–2	Anton Raadik	TKO	6 (10), 3:00	Mar 15, 1949	Civic Auditorium, Honolulu, Hawaii	
33	Win	31–2	Paul Perkins	TKO	2 (10), 1:06	Jan 11, 1949	Civic Auditorium, Honolulu, Hawaii	
32	Win	30–2	Johnny Boski	KO	1 (10)	Dec 14, 1948	Civic Auditorium, Honolulu, Hawaii	
31	Win	29–2	Kenny Watkins	UD	10	Oct 26, 1948	Civic Auditorium, Honolulu, Hawaii	
30	Win	28–2	Boy Brooks	TKO	3 (10)	Oct 12, 1948	Civic Auditorium, Honolulu, Hawaii	
29	Win	27–2	Charley Cato	UD	8	Jul 20, 1948	Civic Auditorium, Honolulu, Hawaii	
28	Win	26–2	Bobby Castro	MD	10	May 11, 1948	Civic Auditorium, Honolulu, Hawaii	
27	Win	25–2	Flashy Sebastian	KO	7 (10)	Apr 7, 1948	Rizal Memorial Sports Complex, Manila, Metro Manila, Philippines	
26	Win	24–2	Boy Brooks	PTS	12	Jan 18, 1948	Rizal Memorial Sports Complex, Manila, Metro Manila, Philippines	Won USA Hawaii middleweight title
25	Win	23–2	Nai Som Pong	TKO	3 (10)	Dec 17, 1947	Rizal Memorial Sports Complex, Manila, Metro Manila, Philippines	
24	Loss	22–2	Boy Brooks	PTS	10	Nov 22, 1947	Honolulu Stadium, Honolulu, Hawaii	Lost USA Hawaii middleweight title
23	Win	22–1	George Duke	UD	10	Aug 19, 1947	Honolulu Stadium, Honolulu, Hawaii	Won USA Hawaii middleweight title
22	Loss	21–1	George Duke	UD	10	Jul 4, 1947	Civic Auditorium, Honolulu, Hawaii	Lost USA Hawaii middleweight title
21	Win	21–0	Paule Lewis	UD	10	Jun 20, 1947	Civic Auditorium, Honolulu, Hawaii	
20	Win	20–0	Leroy Wade	TKO	4 (10), 3:00	May 2, 1947	Civic Auditorium, Honolulu, Hawaii	Retained USA Hawaii middleweight title
19	Win	19–0	Candy McDaniels	UD	10	Mar 21, 1947	Civic Auditorium, Honolulu, Hawaii	Retained USA Hawaii middleweight title
18	Win	18–0	Gil Mojica	PTS	10	Jan 28, 1947	Civic Auditorium, Honolulu, Hawaii	
17	Win	17–0	Wayne Powell	TKO	4 (10), 2:30	Dec 2, 1946	Civic Auditorium, Honolulu, Hawaii	
16	Win	16–0	Wayne Powell	TKO	4 (10), 2:20	Oct 7, 1946	Civic Auditorium, Honolulu, Hawaii	Won vacant USA Hawaii middleweight title
15	Win	15–0	Jackie Ryan	TKO	5 (8), 3:00	Sep 9, 1946	Civic Auditorium, Honolulu, Hawaii	
14	Win	14–0	Johnny Boskie	KO	3 (5)	Aug 19, 1946	Civic Auditorium, Honolulu, Hawaii	
13	Win	13–0	Johnny Boskie	KO	4 (6)	Jul 26, 1946	Civic Auditorium, Honolulu, Hawaii	
12	Win	12–0	Ernie Horne	TKO	2 (5), 1:25	Jul 19, 1946	Civic Auditorium, Honolulu, Hawaii	
11	Win	11–0	Delaware Bradby	TKO	3 (6)	Feb 25, 1946	San Francisco Civic Auditorium, San Francisco, California, US	
10	Win	10–0	Chuck Ross	PTS	6	Feb 4, 1946	Coliseum Bowl, San Francisco, California, US	
9	Win	9–0	Pedro Jimenez	KO	4 (6)	Jan 28, 1946	Coliseum Bowl, San Francisco, California, US	
8	Win	8–0	Vepe Watson	KO	1 (4)	Jan 14, 1946	Coliseum Bowl, San Francisco, California, US	
7	Win	7–0	Obie Wooten	TKO	1 (4)	Jan 7, 1946	San Francisco Civic Auditorium, San Francisco, California, US	
6	Win	6–0	LaVelle Perkins	PTS	4	Dec 21, 1945	Sacramento, California, US	
5	Win	5–0	Bobby Jones	TKO	2 (4)	Dec 10, 1945	San Francisco Civic Auditorium, San Francisco, California, US	
4	Win	4–0	Art Robinson	TKO	4 (4)	Nov 23, 1945	San Francisco Civic Auditorium, San Francisco, California, US	
3	Win	3–0	Young Pancho	PTS	4	Sep 10, 1944	Civic Auditorium, Honolulu, Hawaii	
2	Win	2–0	Ben Ramos	TKO	4 (4), 2:35	Aug 27, 1944	Civic Auditorium, Honolulu, Hawaii	
1	Win	1–0	Bob Correa	KO	2 (4)	Aug 19, 1944	Civic Auditorium, Honolulu, Hawaii	

== Titles in boxing ==
=== Major world titles ===
- NYSAC middleweight champion (160 lbs)
- NBA (WBA) middleweight champion (160 lbs)

=== The Ring magazine titles ===
- The Ring middleweight champion (160 lbs)

=== Regional/International titles ===
- American middleweight champion (160 lbs)
- Hawaii middleweight champion (160 lbs) (3×)

=== Undisputed titles ===
- Undisputed middleweight champion

== See also ==
- List of middleweight boxing champions

Achievements
Preceded by Sugar Ray Robinson; Retired	World Middleweight Champion; October 21, 1953 – December 9, 1955	Succeeded by Sugar Ray Robinson
