= Walter Cartier =

American boxer

- Born: March 29, 1922
- Died: August 17, 1995 (aged 73)

Walter Cartier (March 29, 1922 – August 17, 1995) was an American professional boxer and actor, born and raised in the Bronx in New York City, New York. He was of Irish ancestry, and his grandfather had changed the family surname from McCarthy.

Cartier became a professional boxer after World War II and fought against four world champions, among other top fighters. In early 1949, he was featured in the first of a photo essay about prizefighters for Look magazine by Stanley Kubrick, then on staff. Two years later, Kubrick used Cartier and his twin brother Vincent in his debut film as a director, the 16-minute Day of the Fight (1951). This was a catalyst for Cartier's entry into acting in films and television. He is best known today for his role in the long-running United States sitcom The Phil Silvers Show, appearing as Private Claude Dillingham.

== Professional boxing career ==
As a professional middleweight boxer, Cartier fought some of the best fighters of his era, including Gene Hairston, Billy Kilgore, Garth Panther, Randy Sandy, Bobby Dykes, Gene Boland, and Billy Kilroy (all of whom he beat), as well as Pierre Langlois (a ten-round draw), Rocky Castellani, and world champions Kid Gavilán, Joey Giardello, Carl Olson, and Randy Turpin. The fight with Turpin was controversial. Fought on March 17, 1953 at Kensington's Earl's Court Express in England, it ended with Cartier being disqualified for holding in round two. With the bout over, Cartier went after Turpin and his twin brother Vincent attacked the fight's referee. As a result, Cartier was fined 1,000 British pounds.

Cartier never fought for a world title despite having faced these four former world champions. He finished his professional boxing career with a record of 46 wins, 13 losses, and 2 draws (ties); 24 wins and 9 losses were by knockout.

== Acting career ==
In January 1949, Stanley Kubrick, then working as a staff photographer for Look magazine, featured Cartier in an eight-page photo essay about boxing, called "Prizefighter". Kubrick was a boxing enthusiast and two years later, he made his debut 16-minute film, Day of the Fight (1951), featuring Cartier and his twin brother Vincent.

After this, Walter Cartier pursued acting in films and television. He was in Somebody Up There Likes Me (1956). He was a regular on The Phil Silvers Show, appearing as the mild-mannered Private Claude Dillingham. A first season episode, "The Boxer," introduced Cartier and his boxing skills. He was a regular member of the platoon for the first two seasons.

== Ancestry ==
Cartier's ancestry was Irish. To evade discrimination, his paternal grandfather had changed the family name from McCarthy, first to Carter, and later to Cartier.
