= Eduardo Lausse =

Argentine boxer

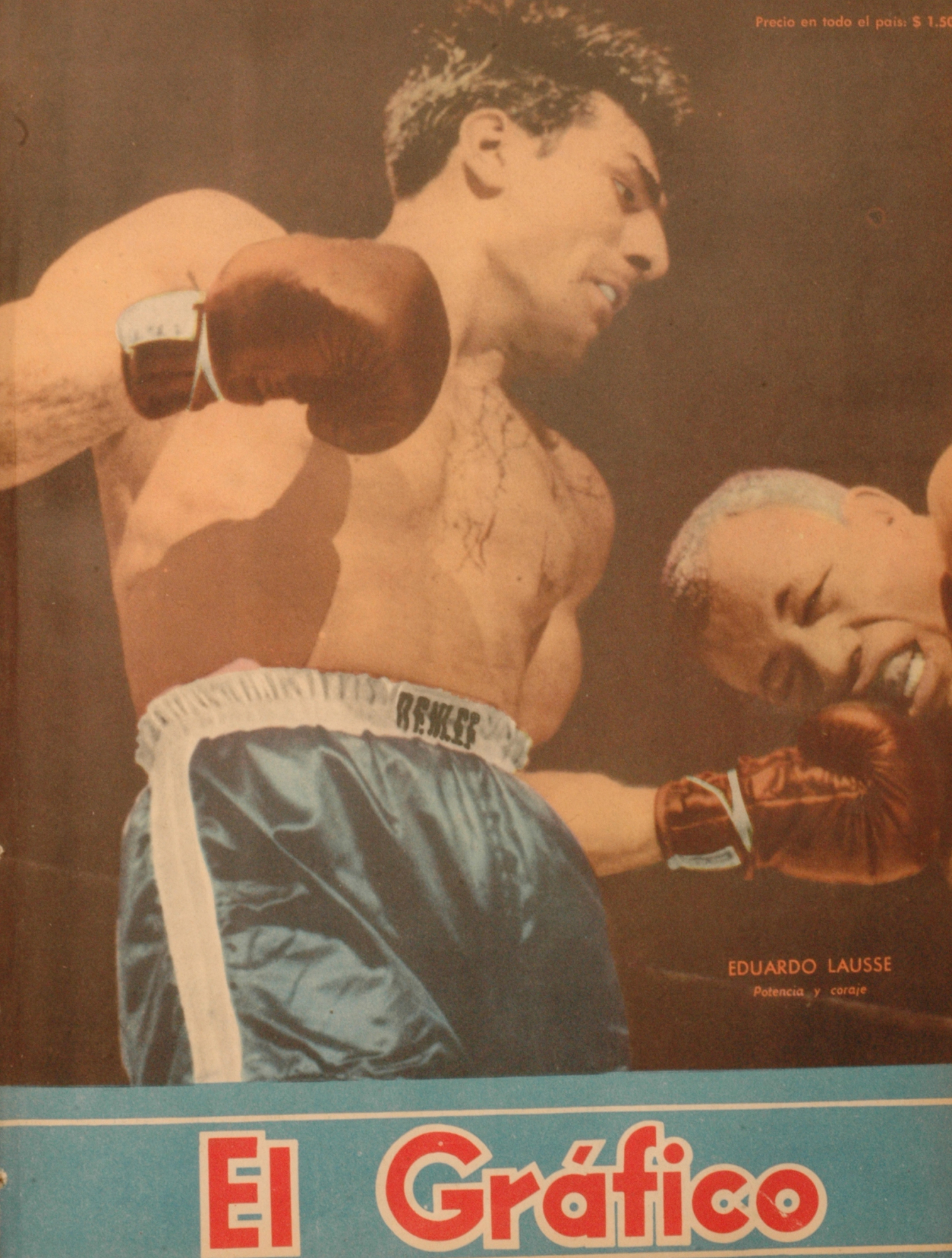
Eduardo Lausse in 1955.

Eduardo Jorge Lausse (November 27, 1927 – May 8, 1995) was an Argentine middleweight contender, known for his knockout punch, who boxed from 1947 to 1960. He was a southpaw who fought mainly in South America. His career record was 75 wins (63 by KO), 10 losses and 2 draws.

He fought former welterweight champion Kid Gavilan on September 13, 1952, dropping a ten round decision, but defeated Gavilan in a rematch on September 3, 1955. Lausse, nicknamed El Zurdo, also fought and outpointed future middleweight champion Gene Fullmer, but never fought for the crown. In 2003 Lausse made the Ring Magazine's list of 100 greatest punchers of all time.
