= Joey Giambra (boxer) =

American boxer (1931–2018)

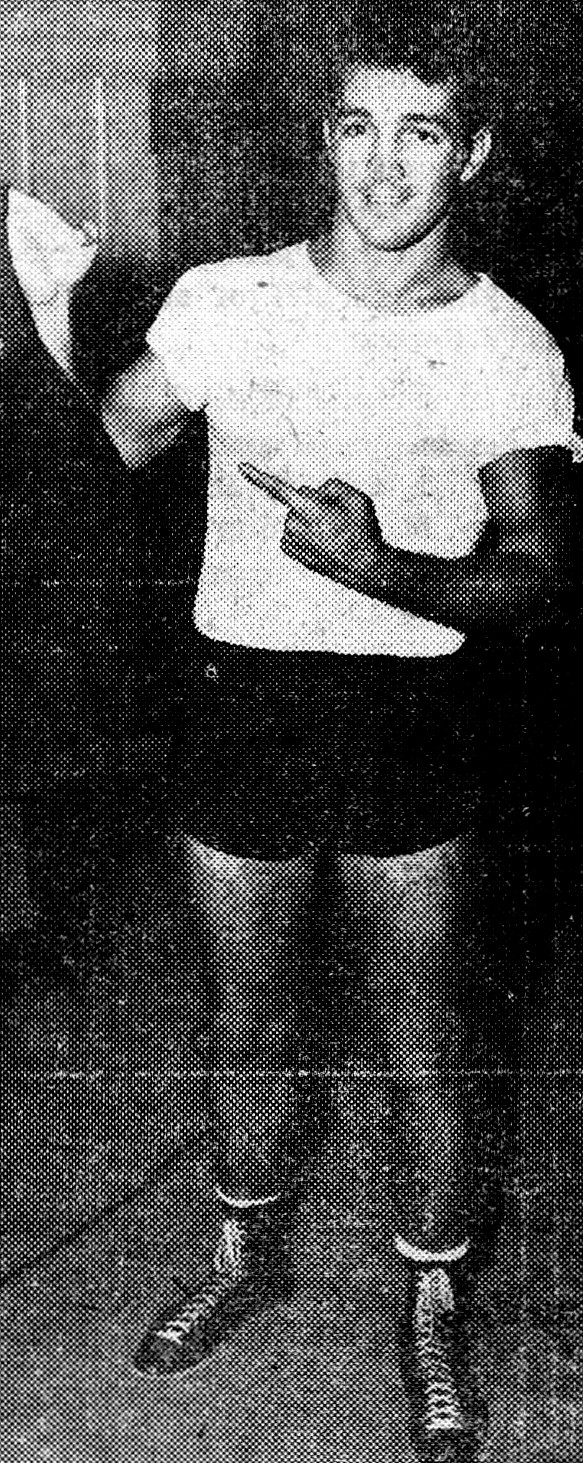
- Giambra, circa 1955
- Born: William Joseph Giambra; July 30, 1931; Buffalo, New York, U.S.
- Died: March 2, 2018 (aged 86); Las Vegas, Nevada, U.S.
- Occupation: Athlete

William Joseph Giambra (July 30, 1931 – March 2, 2018) was an American boxer who faced and defeated most of the top contenders of his era.

He was the son of Sicilian immigrants Michele Giambra (born in the city of Caltanissetta) and Rosa Maggio Giambra (born in Cammarata).

Giambra fought as a middleweight, he defeated future middleweight champion Joey Giardello in two out of three matches and claimed May 18 on the wildly popular KQRS/Minneapolis Morning Show that he was "robbed" in the first bout.

Giambra was never given the opportunity to fight for the world middleweight championship, although he defeated Rocky Castellani twice, Castellani was given the opportunity to fight in an elimination bout for the world title against Sugar Ray Robinson.

On August 26, 1955, world middleweight champion Bobo Olson agreed to fight Giambra in a non-title match on national TV. Giambra continually beat the champion to the punch and rocked him many times throughout the fight, but at the end Olson was awarded a split decision win. After this bout, Giambra was hailed by many as the "uncrowned" king of the middleweight division.

Joey Giambra retired after 77 fights, in which he suffered 10 losses and 2 draws. He was never KO'd in his boxing career. His record was 65-10-2 with 31 knockouts.

Giambra later became a referee and was the third man in the 1977 Jerry Quarry-Lorenzo Zanon heavyweight bout. In his last years he resided in Las Vegas, Nevada.
