= Livio Minelli =

Italian boxer (1926–2012)

Personal information
- Nationality: (Italy) Italian
- Born: Livio Minelli; 11 February 1926 Bergamo, Italy
- Died: 4 February 2012 (aged 85) Goshen, New York
- Weight: Welterweight

Boxing career

Boxing record
- Total fights: 86
- Wins: 60
- Win by KO: 18
- Losses: 19
- Draws: 7
- No contests: 0 Source: boxrec.com

Livio Minelli (February 11, 1926 – February 4, 2012) was an Italian professional boxer. Turning professional in 1943, he fought a total of 86 fights and was the European Boxing Union welterweight champion in 1949. He also fought five world champions in the United States. In later years he became a chef and restaurant owner in New York City. He died on February 4, 2012, at a nursing home in Goshen.
