= Boxing in the 1950s =

Boxing in the 1950s was a popular sport worldwide, especially compared with the 21st century.

During the 1950s, a couple of relatively new developments changed the world: World War II had only been over for five years when the 1950s began, and television was beginning to make a major impact internationally. In boxing, changes connected to these developments could be seen too, as boxers who fought at the 1940s conflict returned to their homes and many of them were back in the ring. Television producers were in love with sports, which provided the viewer with an opportunity to observe sporting events live, and boxing was not the exception to the rule; many television networks began to feature fights live during the weekends, and the Gillette Friday Night Fights proved to be one of the most popular boxing television series in American history.

The dawn of the jet airplane era in 1958 also helped boxing expand worldwide: with airplanes flying faster and more frequently between cities far away from each other, more and more world title fights began to be fought outside the United States. Vic Toweel became South Africa's first world boxing champion, Jimmy Carruthers did the same for Australia, Pascual Pérez was the first from Argentina, Yoshio Shirai (who was beaten by Pérez), won Japan's first world title, and Hogan Bassey won the first belt for Nigeria.

Popular American fighters in the 1950s proved legendary: Sugar Ray Robinson would still win (and lose) world titles, Rocky Marciano became the only heavyweight world champion in history to retire with perfect record. Jersey Joe Walcott the oldest heavyweight champion (until George Foreman regained the title in 1994), Archie Moore broke the all-time knockout record as well as the record for the oldest champion, at 48, for any division, Ezzard Charles proved to be a reliable substitute for Joe Louis as heavyweight champ, and Floyd Patterson emerged as the youngest heavyweight champion in history (coincidentally, he beat Moore for the title left vacant by Marciano). Patterson remained the youngest heavyweight champion in history until November 22, 1986, when a 20-year-old Mike Tyson defeated the 31-year-old WBC Heavyweight Champion Trevor Berbick by TKO in round 2.

The dark side of boxing once again emerged: Jake LaMotta alleged at a hearing that he had thrown a fight with Billy Fox in exchange for a try at the world Middleweight title, and Jim Norris, an important promoter of the time, was associated with Blinky Palermo and Frankie Carbo, two Mafia members of the time.

== 1950 ==
- January 16 – In the first world title fight of the decade, Willie Pep retains his world Featherweight title, with a fifth-round knockout of Charley Riley, St. Louis.
- January 24 – Joey Maxim wins the world Light Heavyweight title with a tenth-round knockout over Freddie Mills, London.
- March 24 – In the closest Rocky Marciano was probably ever to being defeated, he squeezes by a ten-round split decision win over Roland La Starza in New York City.
- April 25 – Terry Allen of England wins the vacant world Flyweight title with a fifteen-round decision over Honore Pratesi, in London.
- May 31 – Vic Toweel becomes South Africa's first world boxing champion, outpointing world Bantamweight champion Manuel Ortiz over fifteen rounds, in Johannesburg, South Africa.
- August 25 – Sugar Ray Robinson defends his Pennsylvania version of the world Middleweight title (Jake LaMotta was the universally recognized world champion) by knocking out Jose Basora in 48 seconds, a record for a championship fight that stood for 37 years, in Scranton.
- September 8 – Willie Pep and Sandy Saddler fight their third of four fights against each other: Saddler regains the world Featherweight title with an eighth-round knockout, Yankee Stadium, New York.
- September 13 – Jake LaMotta, behind on all three judges' scorecards, scores a knockout in the fifteenth and last round, retaining his world Middleweight title against Laurent Dauthiulle, Detroit.
- September 27 – Ezzard Charles retains his world Heavyweight title with a fifteen-round unanimous decision over former world champion Joe Louis, New York. It shall be said that, although Charles was officially the world Heavyweight champion since June 21, 1949, many fans still viewed Louis, for sentimental reasons more than anything else, as the real world Heavyweight champion. Charles was recognized universally after defeating Louis.

== 1951 ==
- February 14 – St. Valentine's Day Massacre as Sugar Ray Robinson and Jake LaMotta finish their six fight boxing rivalry when Robinson wins the undisputed world Middleweight title, knocking LaMotta out in round thirteen, at Chicago.
- March 7 – Ezzard Charles retains his world Heavyweight title with a fifteen-round unanimous, but highly disputed by fans, decision over Jersey Joe Walcott, Detroit.
- May 25 – Jimmy Carter, an unknown at the time, produces an upset by knocking out world Lightweight champion Ike Williams in fourteen rounds at New York, to win the world title.
- May 30 – Ezzard Charles beats world Light Heavyweight champion Joey Maxim for the fourth time in their career, by a fifteen-round unanimous decision in Chicago, to retain the world Heavyweight title. Maxim was attempting to become the first world Light Heavyweight champion to raise weight and win the world Heavyweight title.
- July 10 – Randy Turpin wins the world Middleweight title by defeating Sugar Ray Robinson with a fifteen-round decision, London.
- July 18 – At the age of 37, Jersey Joe Walcott becomes the oldest world Heavyweight champion in boxing history, knocking out Ezzard Charles in seven rounds at Pittsburgh. Charles was making the ninth defense of his title. Walcott maintained the record for 44 years.
- September 12 – Sugar Ray Robinson recovers the world Middleweight title with a tenth-round knockout of Randy Turpin, in New York.
- September 26 – Chapter four of the Saddler-Pep rivalry, as Saddler regained the world Featherweight title with a tenth-round technical knockout. Saddler and Pep fell to the floor so often when grabbing on to each other in this fight, that referee Ray Miller joined the fighters himself during a seventh round fall. Both fighters were later suspended by the New York State Athletic commission for what they viewed as dirty fighting.
- October 26 – Joe Louis' last fight, as he is knocked out in eight rounds by the up-and-coming Rocky Marciano.

== 1952 ==
- March 13 – Sugar Ray Robinson retains his world Welterweight title, defeating future world champion Carl Olson, by a fifteen-round unanimous decision, San Francisco. Robinson donated all of his earnings for this fight, except for $1 dollar, to the Damon Runyon cancer fund.
- April 16 – In a highly anticipated bout, Sugar Ray Robinson retains his world Middleweight title with a third-round knockout of former world champion Rocky Graziano, who had knocked Robinson down seconds before losing the fight, Chicago.
- May 19 – Yoshio Shirai becomes Japan's first world champion in boxing history, defeating Dado Marino by a fifteen-round decision for the world Flyweight title, Tokyo, Japan.
- June 5 – Jersey Joe Walcott and Ezzard Charles complete their four fight rivalry, with Walcott retaining the world Heavyweight title, by a fifteen-round unanimous decision, Philadelphia.
- June 25 – Sugar Ray Robinson suffers from heat exhaustion and loses by knockout for the only time in his career, when Dr. Alexander I. Schiff orders him not to continue after round thirteen of his challenge of world Light Heavyweight champion Joey Maxim, under 104 heat degrees, in New York City. Both Robinson and referee Ruby Goldstein have to be hospitalized after the bout. Goldstein had to leave the fight in round ten, being substituted by Ray Miller for the rest of the fight.
- September 23 – Rocky Marciano becomes world Heavyweight champion, with what many have referred to as the greatest punch in boxing history, knocking out Jersey Joe Walcott in thirteen rounds, at Philadelphia.
- October 15 – Jimmy Carter regains the world Lightweight title, defeating his former conqueror Lauro Salas, by a fifteen-round unanimous decision, Chicago.
- November 15 – Jimmy Carruthers becomes Australia's first world boxing champion in history, by knocking out South Africa's first, Vic Toweel, in the first round to gain the world Bantamweight title, Johannesburg, South Africa.
- November 15 – Yoshio Shirai retains his world Flyweight title with a fifteen-round decision over former world champion Dado Marino, at their Tokyo rematch.
- December 17–36-year-old Archie Moore wins the world Light Heavyweight title by beating Joey Maxim by a fifteen-round unanimous decision, at St. Louis.

== 1953 ==
- May 15 – Rocky Marciano knocks out Jersey Joe Walcott in the first round, of their Heavyweight title rematch.
- September 18 – Kid Gavilán retains his world Welterweight title with a fifteen-round split decision over Carmen Basilio, Syracuse.
- September 24 – In a rematch fight, Rocky Marciano retains his world Heavyweight title with an eleventh-round knockout win over Roland La Starza, New York City.
- October 21 – After Sugar Ray Robinson's first retirement, Carl Olson becomes world Middleweight champion, winning the vacant title with a fifteen-round decision over former world champion Randy Turpin, New York.

== 1954 ==
- January 27 – World Light-Heavyweight champion Archie Moore retains the title with a third consecutive fifteen-round decision over former world champion Joey Maxim, in Miami.
- February 26 – Lulu Perez beats Willie Pep by knockout in round two at New York City. The fight is tainted with controversy, as many thought that it was a fixed fight. Pep later sued Sports Illustrated for 75 million dollars after Sports Illustrated ran a story in 1981 that suggested Pep took a dive for 16,000 dollars. A jury deliberated for only 15 minutes to rule against Perez.
- April 1 – Bobo Olson retains his world Middleweight title with a fifteen-round majority decision over world Welterweight champion Kid Gavilán, at Chicago.
- June 17 – World Heavyweight champion Rocky Marciano defeats former champion Ezzard Charles, who was attempting to become the first boxer in history to recover the world Heavyweight title, by a fifteen-round unanimous decision, at New York.
- August 11 – World Light-Heavyweight champion Archie Moore makes his Madison Square Garden debut, retaining the title with a fourteenth-round knockout win over future world champion Harold Johnson.
- September 17 – In a rematch of their earlier bout of this same year, Rocky Marciano retains his World Heavyweight Champion title with an eighth-round knockout of former world champion Ezzard Charles, New York.
- October 20 – Johnny Saxton becomes world Welterweight champion, defeating Kid Gavilán by a fifteen-round unanimous decision in Philadelphia. It was a controversial win, and 20 of 22 boxing reporters seated at ringside thought Gavilan should have gotten the decision.
- November 17 – Jimmy Carter joins the exclusive group of boxers who have been world champions at the same division three or more times, knocking out world Lightweight champion Paddy DeMarco in round fifteen to win the Lightweight title for the third time, San Francisco.
- November 26 – Pascual Pérez becomes Argentina's first world boxing champion, defeating Yoshio Shirai by a fifteen-round unanimous decision to take the world Flyweight championship, Tokyo, Japan.

== 1955 ==
- February 24 – African-American IH "Sporty" Harvey, who had successfully challenged boxing segregation in court, fights Buddy Turman in the first legal interracial boxing match in Texas.
- May 16 – Rocky Marciano retains the world Heavyweight title with a ninth-round knockout of Don Cockell, at San Francisco.
- May 30 – In a rematch, Pascual Pérez retains the world Flyweight title with a fifth-round knockout of former world champion Yoshio Shirai, Tokyo, Japan.
- June 10 – Carmen Basilio becomes world Welterweight champion, knocking out champion Tony DeMarco in round twelve, at Syracuse.
- June 21 – Archie Moore retains his world Light Heavyweight crown with a third-round knockout of world Middleweight champion Bobo Olson, in New York City.
- June 29 – Wallace (Bud) Smith becomes world Lightweight champion, defeating Jimmy Carter by a fifteen-round split decision, in Boston.
- September 21 – Rocky Marciano fights for the last time, recovering from a knockdown to beat world Light Heavyweight champion Archie Moore by a knockout in round nine at New York, and retiring undefeated with 49 wins, 43 by knockout, as of 2006, the only world Heavyweight champion to go undefeated throughout his career.
- October 19 – Wallace (Bud) Smith retains his world Lightweight title by a fifteen-round decision in a rematch with former three time world champion Jimmy Carter, Cincinnati.
- November 30 – In a rematch, Carmen Basilio retains his world Welterweight title by knocking out former world champion Tony DeMarco in the twelfth round, at Boston.
- December 9 – Sugar Ray Robinson joins the exclusive group of fighters who have been world champion three or more times in one division, winning the world Middleweight title for the third time, with a second-round knockout of champion Carl Olson, at Chicago

== 1956 ==
- January 18 – Sandy Saddler retains his world Featherweight title with a thirteenth-round knockout of future world Jr. Lightweight champion Flash Elorde, in San Francisco. It would be Saddler's last career title bout.
- March 14 – Johnny Saxton regains the world Welterweight title with a fifteen-round unanimous decision over Carmen Basilio, at Chicago. Once again, it would prove to be a controversial win, as most ringside reporters thought Basilio should have deserved the win.
- April 27 – Rocky Marciano announces his retirement, officially making him the only Heavyweight champion in history to retire undefeated, at the Hotel Shelton, New York City.
- May 18 – Sugar Ray Robinson defeats Bobo Olson for the fourth time in their career, knocking out the former Middleweight champion of the world in round four, to retain the world Middleweight title, in Los Angeles.
- June 29 – Mario D'Agata becomes boxing's first deaf-mute world champion in history, defeating Robert Cohen by knockout in six, to win the world Bantamweight title, at Rome, Italy.
- July 27 – Sandy Saddler suffers a life-threatening car accident and requires hospitalization for one month.
- August 24 – Joe Brown wins the world Lightweight title with a fifteen-round split decision over Bud Smith, New Orleans.
- September 12 – Carmen Basilio regains the world Welterweight title with a ninth-round knockout over Johnny Saxton, in Syracuse.
- November 30 – The former middleweight gold medalist from the Olympic summer games 1952 Floyd Patterson wins the vacant world Heavyweight championship with a fifth-round knockout win over world light heavyweight champion Archie Moore, on the same night that his wife gave birth to a baby girl. Patterson became, at 21, the youngest world Heavyweight champion in history, record that he would maintain until 1986. Moore, by his part, at 42, was attempting to become the oldest world heavyweight champion in history. Right after the fight, held at Chicago, Patterson flew to New York to see his daughter.

== 1957 ==
- January 2 – Gene Fullmer becomes world Middleweight champion, defeating Sugar Ray Robinson by a fifteen-round decision, at New York City.
- February 13 – Joe Brown retains his world Lightweight title with an eleventh-round knockout of former world champion Bud Smith, at their Miami rematch.
- February 21 – Carmen Basilio retains his world Welterweight title with a second-round knockout of former world champion Johnny Saxton in their rubber match, at Cleveland.
- April 1 – Alphonse Halimi wins the world Bantamweight title with a fifteen-round decision over Mario D'Agata, Paris, France.
- May 1 – Sugar Ray Robinson wins the world Middleweight title for a record fourth time, knocking out Gene Fullmer in the fifth round with a punch that became known as the perfect punch, at Chicago.
- June 24 – Hogan Bassey becomes Nigeria's first world boxing champion in history, winning the vacant world Featherweight title with a tenth-round knockout of Cherif Hamia, at Paris.
- September 23 – Carmen Basilio becomes the world's Middleweight champion by defeating Sugar Ray Robinson by a fifteen-round split decision, at New York.
- November 6 – Alphonse Halimi retains the world Bantamweight title and unifies it, beating National Boxing Association world champion Raul Macias by a fifteen-round decision, at Los Angeles.

== 1958 ==
- January 21 – In a non-title affair, future world Welterweight champion Virgil Akins knocks out former world champion Tony DeMarco in twelve rounds, at Boston.
- March 25 – Sugar Ray Robinson breaks his own record, becoming world Middleweight champion for the fifth time by defeating Carmen Basilio with a fifteen-round split decision, at Chicago.
- May 7 – Joe Brown retains the world Lightweight title, with an eighth-round TKO of Ralph Dupas, at Houston
- June 5 – Virgil Akins wins the world Welterweight title that had been vacated by Carmen Basilio, knocking out Vince Martinez in four rounds, at St. Louis.
- July 23 – Joe Brown retains his world Lightweight title with a fifteen-round decision over perennial world title challenger Kenny Lane, in Houston.
- September 14 — Ingemar Johansson defeats the contender Eddie Machen in the first round at Ullevi, Gothenburg qualifying him to a future title match against the heavyweight champion Floyd Patterson.
- December 5 – Don Jordan wins the world Welterweight title from Virgil Akins with a fifteen-round unanimous decision at Jordan's hometown of Los Angeles.
- December 10 – Archie Moore recovers from three falls in round one and another one in round five, to knock out challenger Yvon Durelle in eleven rounds to retain his world Light-Heavyweight title in what is considered by many to be one of boxing's greatest fights, at Montreal, Canada.

== 1959 ==
- March 12 – In the first world Jr. Welterweight title bout contested since 1946, Carlos Ortiz becomes Puerto Rico's second world champion boxer, knocking out Kenny Lane in two rounds to win the vacant world title, at New York City.
- March 18 – Davey Moore wins the world Featherweight title, knocking out Hogan Bassey, at Los Angeles in round fourteen.
- April 15 – Sonny Liston keeps his climb among challengers in the Heavyweight division by knocking out Cleveland Williams in the third round, at Miami Beach.
- April 24 – Don Jordan retains his world Welterweight championship, after spraining his right hand, with a fifteen-round unanimous decision over former world champion Virgil Akins at their St. Louis rematch.
- June 26 – In the first of their three fights, Ingemar Johansson becomes the world Heavyweight champion, by knocking out Floyd Patterson in round three, at New York.
- July 20 – In the first bout for the world Jr. Lightweight title since 1949, Harold Gomes of Rhode Island wins the vacant title by decisioning Paul Jorgensen over fifteen rounds at Providence.
- August 12 – In a rematch of their 1958 bout, Archie Moore retains his world Light Heavyweight championship, with a three-round knockout win of Yvon Durelle, in Montreal, Canada.
- August 28 – Gene Fullmer wins the National Boxing Association's world Middleweight title, after the division had been vacated by Sugar Ray Robinson's retirement, with a fourteenth-round knockout over Carmen Basilio, at San Francisco.
