= Percy Bassett =

American boxer (1930–1993)

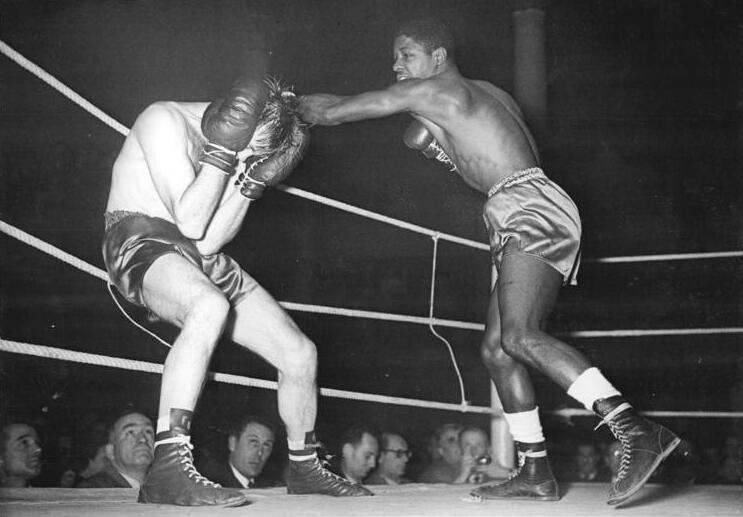
Percy Basset (right) in the ring with French boxer Francis Bonnardel (left), February 10, 1954

Percy Bassett (January 3, 1930 – July 7, 1993) was a featherweight professional boxer from Pennsylvania.

== Personal life ==
Percy Bassett was born in Danville, Virginia in 1930, but his family moved to West Philadelphia when Bassett was 6 years old. Bassett went to Overbrook High School but he dropped out once he began boxing. He had 16 amateur fights and won the prestigious Inquirer Diamond Belt championship in 1947. He turned pro later that year. He is buried in Mount Moriah Cemetery.

== Professional career ==
Bassett made his professional debut at the age of 17, on July 31, 1947. The result in his first professional bout was a 3rd round knockout of opponent Joe Camarata. Bassett fought frequently, and had compiled a record of 25–0 before losing for the first time, an eight-round points loss to Brown Lee on December 23, 1948. Bassett avenged that loss just eight days later, with a ten-round decision. Bassett continued to fight often, and to win most of the time. Unfortunately for Bassett, he had no mob connections, and never got a title fight. He did get an interim belts while Sandy Saddler was in the army, but never had the privilege of fighting for the championships. Despite this, Bassett faced a number of the top small fighters of his era, including Mario Pacheco, Miguel Acevedo, Redtop Davis, Jimmy Carter, Frankie Sodano, Federico Plummer, Ray Famechon, Lulu Perez, and others. Bassett's retirement due to a detached retina came after his last fight, a tenth round TKO of undefeated (16-0) Seraphin Ferrer. Bassett's final record was 64 wins (41 by knockout), 12 losses, and 1 draw.

== Death ==
On December 20, 1950, Bassett fought Sonny Boy West, a well-regarded veteran lightweight from Baltimore with a professional record of 46–7–1. Betnween the sixth and seventh rounds West began to complain in his corner of double vision, but the fight was allowed to continue. According to boxrec.com, "After he was hurt to the body by Bassett, he was floored by a right hand. As he fell, he landed hard on his head. West died of injuries suffered in this bout on December 21st. The official cause of death was given as an 'inter-cerebral hemorrhage resulting from a cerebral concussion.'".
