= Paddy DeMarco =

American boxer

Personal information
- Nickname: The Brooklyn Billygoat
- Nationality: American
- Born: Pasquale DeMarco; February 10, 1928 Brooklyn, New York, U.S.
- Died: December 13, 1997 (aged 69) Salt Lake City, Utah, U.S.
- Height: 5 ft 6 in (168 cm)
- Weight: Lightweight

Boxing career
- Stance: Orthodox

Boxing record
- Total fights: 104
- Wins: 75
- Win by KO: 8
- Losses: 26
- Draws: 3

Paddy DeMarco (February 10, 1928 – December 13, 1997) was a lightweight professional boxer from Brooklyn, New York, who took the Undisputed Lightweight World Championship on March 5, 1954, against Jimmy Carter. His managers included Jimmy Dixon and Cy Crespi. His trainer was Dan Florio.

== Early life and career ==
DeMarco was born in Brooklyn, New York, on February 10, 1928. He was raised there and considered it his hometown.

DeMarco won his first five professional fights in 1945, losing for the first time against Butch Charles in October of the same year. It was on the 10th of that month that DeMarco fought the legendary Willie Pep, whose record was an unbelievable 131-1-1 at the time. DeMarco lost the unanimous ten-round decision, one of very few early setbacks.

On March 4, 1949, he defeated 1989 Boxing Hall of Famer Billy Graham in a somewhat close, rather uneventful ten round unanimous decision before 8,493 at New York's Madison Square Garden. DeMarco piled up a big lead in points in the early rounds in a match that the Associated Press scored six to four for DeMarco.

== Three bouts with Featherweight Champ Sandy Saddler, 1949–1951 ==
Many consider his bouts with Sandy Saddler his best. They met three times, with DeMarco impressively winning two of the three bouts. On August 27, 1951, DeMarco beat Saddler, the reigning World Featherweight Champion, in a ten-round split decision at the Arena in Milwaukee, Wisconsin. Though he left the ring with his nose bleeding, DeMarco was the clear winner, firing with both hands, and pushing his opponent into the ropes. The bout saw no knockdowns.

DeMarco also beat Saddler on December 7, 1951, before 5,635, in another ten round split decision, this time at Madison Square Garden, boxing's New York cathedral. The United Press, believing he dominated gave DeMarco seven rounds with only three for Saddler. In the fifth, DeMarco clearly showed his superiority over his opponent, who was making a return to the ring after a two-month suspension. The bout saw a great deal of clinching and had both participants warned more than once for using tactics more common to wrestling than boxing matches. Saddler complained bitterly after the bout, believing he was the clear winner.

In his first meeting with Saddler before 13,071 on October 28, 1949, DeMarco lost at Madison Square Garden on a ninth-round TKO. Saddler lost the first three rounds on points, and then bored in and demolished his opponent. In the fourth round, Saddler made a mess of DeMarco's face, and continued to gain on points throughout the end of the eighth, when DeMarco's handlers signaled to the referee to end the bout.

=== Important early career bouts ===
On December 22, 1949, DeMarco defeated Teddy Davis before 2,500 at the Broadway Arena in Brooklyn in an eight-round unanimous decision. DeMarco lost to Davis on August 2, 1950, in a ten-round points decision at the Crystal Arena in Norwolk, Connecticut. In a close bout the referee gave Davis three rounds, Demarco two, with five even.

On February 1, 1950, DeMarco defeated Cuban lightweight contender Orlando Zulueta for the only time in a ten-round unanimous decision at St. Nicholas Arena in New York. He lost to Zulueta on two other occasions in close ten-round decisions at Eastern Parkway Arena in Brooklyn, first on October 27, 1952, and again on September 21, 1953.

On September 24, 1951, DeMarco defeated Enrique Bolanos at the Coliseum in Chicago in a ten-round unanimous decision. In a decisive victory, one judge gave DeMarco every round, and one round was the most any of the decision makers gave Bolanos in a bout where DeMarco took the offensive from the opening round. There were no knockdowns in the bout.

DeMarco first defeated Henry Davis comfortably in a ten-round unanimous decision at Madison Square Garden on November 21, 1952. The AP gave seven rounds to DeMarco with only three to Davis. The crowd of 3,418 was not thrilled with the match as the only knockdown came in the third from Davis, and it may have been an accidental slip. DeMarco beat Davis again on March 14, 1953, at Boston Garden in another ten round unanimous decision. In a decisive win, both of Davis's eyes were nearly closed from swelling by the end of the bout.

== Taking the World Lightweight Championship, March 1954 ==
In 1954, DeMarco twice challenged Black boxer and reigning World Lightweight Champion Jimmy Carter for the Lightweight Championship of the World. He won the first meeting on March 5, 1954, in a fifteen-round unanimous decision at Madison Square Garden. In a major upset, that saw him as a 4-1 underdog in the early betting, DeMarco won the bout decisively on points and took the world title. In the first two rounds, DeMarco gained a lead on points with close range jabs, hooks, and body punching. Though losing the fourteenth round, DeMarco dominated on points particularly from the sixth and subsequent rounds where he clearly looked the winner.

== Losing the World Lightweight Championship, November 1954 ==
In his first defense of the World Lightweight Championship, DeMarco lost the title November 17, 1954, to Jimmy Carter in a fifteen-round TKO in Daley, California before 11,000 frantic fans. In the brutal and savage bout, the referee stopped the fighting in the final round, with DeMarco virtually out on his feet, his left eye nearly swollen shut, and his cheek rapidly turning a dark blue. Carter had DeMarco down on the mat twice, once for a four count from a left hook to the chin in the ninth and once in the fourteenth.

On October 3, 1955, though an underdog in the early betting, DeMarco defeated lightweight contender Kenny Lane in a ten-round split decision at the St. Nicholas Arena in New York. DeMarco hit and held repeatedly in the bout, where clutching was common, and even threw in a few headbutts for good measure. There was little in decisive punching as Lane's southpaw stance and DeMarco's constant clutching threw off the timing of both boxers.

DeMarco's last fight was in November 1959. He retired with a career record of 75 wins (8 by knockout, 26 losses, and 3 draws). DeMarco died in Salt Lake City, Utah, on December 13, 1997.

== Professional boxing record ==
104 fights	75 wins	26 losses
By knockout	8	7
By decision	67	19
Draws	3	

No.	Result	Record	Opponent	Type	Round	Date	Location	Notes
104	Loss	75–26–3	Benny Medina	TKO	7 (10)	Nov 3, 1959	Memorial Auditorium, Fresno, California, U.S.	
103	Loss	75–25–3	Stan Harrington	UD	10	Oct 20, 1959	Civic Auditorium, Honolulu, Hawaii, U.S.	
102	Loss	75–24–3	David Cervantes	MD	10	Sep 14, 1959	Plaza de Toros, Ciudad Juarez, Chihuahua, Mexico	
101	Loss	75–23–3	Denny Moyer	TKO	10 (10)	Sep 3, 1959	Auditorium, Portland, Oregon, U.S.	
100	Win	75–22–3	Tommy Garrow	MD	10	Aug 11, 1959	Wahconah Park, Pittsfield, Massachusetts, U.S.	
99	Loss	74–22–3	Tony Dupas	UD	10	Jul 25, 1959	Bringhurst Field, Alexandria, Louisiana, U.S.	
98	Loss	74–21–3	Florentino Fernández	TKO	4 (10)	May 9, 1959	Coliseo de la Ciudad, Havana, Cuba	
97	Loss	74–20–3	Johnny Gonsalves	UD	10	Feb 10, 1959	Auditorium, Oakland, California, U.S.	
96	Win	74–19–3	Lionel Butler	TKO	10 (10)	Dec 29, 1958	Arcadia Ballroom, Providence, Rhode Island, U.S.	
95	Loss	73–19–3	Mickey Crawford	UD	10	Mar 28, 1957	Auditorium, Saginaw, Michigan, U.S.	
94	Loss	73–18–3	Stefan Redl	UD	10	Feb 18, 1957	St. Nicholas Arena, Manhattan, New York City, New York, U.S.	
93	Loss	73–17–3	Larry Boardman	UD	10	Nov 12, 1956	Arena, Philadelphia, Pennsylvania, U.S.	
92	Win	73–16–3	Jimmy Ford	MD	10	Aug 21, 1956	Auditorium, Miami Beach, Florida, U.S.	
91	Draw	72–16–3	Pat Mallane	PTS	10	Jul 17, 1956	Hedges Stadium, Bridgeport, Connecticut, U.S.	
90	Loss	72–16–2	Don Jordan	TKO	5 (10)	Feb 2, 1956	Olympic Auditorium, Los Angeles, California, U.S.	
89	Win	72–15–2	Jackie Blair	UD	10	Jan 9, 1956	Rhode Island Auditorium, Providence, Rhode Island, U.S.	
88	Loss	71–15–2	Frankie Ryff	UD	10	Nov 2, 1955	Coliseum, Baltimore, Maryland, U.S.	
87	Win	71–14–2	Kenny Lane	SD	10	Oct 3, 1955	St. Nicholas Arena, Manhattan, New York City, New York, U.S.	
86	Loss	70–14–2	Ralph Dupas	UD	10	Jul 11, 1955	Pelican Stadium, New Orleans, Louisiana, U.S.	
85	Win	70–13–2	Libby Manzo	SD	10	May 16, 1955	St. Nicholas Arena, Manhattan, New York City, New York, U.S.	
84	Win	69–13–2	Libby Manzo	MD	10	Mar 28, 1955	St. Nicholas Arena, Manhattan, New York City, New York, U.S.	
83	Loss	68–13–2	Seraphin Ferrer	KO	5 (10)	Jan 31, 1955	Palais des Sports, Paris, Paris, France	
82	Loss	68–12–2	Jimmy Carter	TKO	15 (15)	Nov 17, 1954	Cow Palace, Daly City, California, U.S.	Lost NYSAC, NBA, and The Ring lightweight titles
81	Win	68–11–2	Jimmy Carter	UD	15	Mar 5, 1954	Madison Square Garden, Manhattan, New York City, New York, U.S.	Won NYSAC, NBA, The Ring lightweight titles
80	Win	67–11–2	Ralph Dupas	SD	10	Jan 1, 1954	Municipal Auditorium, New Orleans, Louisiana, U.S.	
79	Win	66–11–2	Carlos Chavez	UD	10	Dec 7, 1953	Eastern Parkway Arena, Brooklyn, New York City, New York, U.S.	
78	Loss	65–11–2	Tony DeMarco	SD	10	Oct 10, 1953	Mechanics Building, Boston, Massachusetts, U.S.	
77	Loss	65–10–2	Orlando Zulueta	SD	10	Sep 21, 1953	Eastern Parkway Arena, Brooklyn, New York City, New York, U.S.	
76	Loss	65–9–2	Johnny Gonsalves	SD	10	May 16, 1953	Mechanics Building, Boston, Massachusetts, U.S.	
75	Win	65–8–2	Armand Savoie	UD	10	Apr 27, 1953	Forum, Montreal, Quebec, Canada	
74	Win	64–8–2	Henry Davis	UD	10	Mar 14, 1953	Boston Garden, Boston, Massachusetts, U.S.	
73	Loss	63–8–2	George Araujo	SD	10	Feb 10, 1953	Madison Square Garden, Manhattan, New York City, New York, U.S.	
72	Win	63–7–2	Henry Davis	UD	10	Nov 11, 1952	Madison Square Garden, Manhattan, New York City, New York, U.S.	
71	Loss	62–7–2	Orlando Zulueta	MD	10	Oct 27, 1952	Eastern Parkway Arena, Brooklyn, New York City, New York, U.S.	
70	Loss	62–6–2	Arthur King	UD	10	May 26, 1952	Eastern Parkway Arena, Brooklyn, New York City, New York, U.S.	
69	Win	62–5–2	Johnny Gonsalves	UD	10	Apr 21, 1952	Civic Auditorium, San Francisco, California, U.S.	
68	Draw	61–5–2	Eddie Chavez	TD	4 (10)	Jan 1, 1952	Winterland Arena, San Francisco, California, U.S.	DeMarco ahead on points / Chavez cut by head butt
67	Win	61–5–1	Sandy Saddler	SD	10	Dec 7, 1951	Madison Square Garden, Manhattan, New York City, New York, U.S.	
66	Win	60–5–1	Eddie Chavez	UD	10	Nov 16, 1951	Madison Square Garden, Manhattan, New York City, New York, U.S.	
65	Win	59–5–1	Enrique Bolanos	UD	10	Sep 24, 1951	Coliseum, Chicago, Illinois, U.S.	
64	Win	58–5–1	Sandy Saddler	SD	10	Aug 27, 1951	Arena, Milwaukee, Wisconsin, U.S.	
63	Win	57–5–1	Arthur King	UD	10	Jun 25, 1951	Toppi Stadium, Philadelphia, Pennsylvania, U.S.	
62	Win	56–5–1	Eddie Giosa	UD	10	Jun 1, 1951	St. Nicholas Arena, Manhattan, New York City, New York, U.S.	
61	Win	55–5–1	Jimmy Richmond	TKO	3 (10)	May 10, 1951	Eastern Parkway Arena, Brooklyn, New York City, New York, U.S.	
60	Win	54–5–1	Harry LaSane	UD	10	Apr 9, 1951	Valley Arena, Holyoke, Massachusetts, U.S.	
59	Win	53–5–1	Joey Scarlotta	UD	10	Oct 11, 1950	St. Nicholas Arena, Manhattan, New York City, New York, U.S.	
58	Win	52–5–1	Doug Medley	PTS	8	Sep 30, 1950	Ridgewood Grove, Brooklyn, New York City, New York, U.S.	
57	Win	51–5–1	Young Junior	UD	8	Aug 28, 1950	Ridgewood Grove, Brooklyn, New York City, New York, U.S.	
56	Win	50–5–1	Kid Dussart	UD	10	Aug 18, 1950	Long Beach Stadium, Long Beach, California, U.S.	
55	Loss	49–5–1	Teddy Davis	PTS	10	Aug 2, 1950	Crystal Arena, Norwalk, Connecticut, U.S.	
54	Win	49–4–1	Ray Edwards	UD	8	Jun 22, 1950	Dexter Park Arena, Woodhaven, Queens, New York City, New York, U.S.	
53	Win	48–4–1	Reuben Davis	UD	8	Jun 5, 1950	Ridgewood Grove, Brooklyn, New York City, New York, U.S.	
52	Win	47–4–1	Dennis Pat Brady	SD	10	Apr 28, 1950	St. Nicholas Arena, Manhattan, New York City, New York, U.S.	
51	Win	46–4–1	Eduardo Carrasco	PTS	8	Apr 15, 1950	Mara's Arena, Waterbury, Connecticut, U.S.	
50	Win	45–4–1	Charley Cabey Lewis	PTS	8	Apr 3, 1950	Laurel Garden, Newark, New Jersey, U.S.	
49	Win	44–4–1	Orlando Zulueta	UD	10	Feb 1, 1950	St. Nicholas Arena, Manhattan, New York City, New York, U.S.	
48	Win	43–4–1	Teddy Davis	UD	8	Dec 22, 1949	Broadway Arena, Brooklyn, New York City, New York, U.S.	
47	Loss	42–4–1	Sandy Saddler	RTD	9 (10)	Oct 28, 1949	Madison Square Garden, Manhattan, New York City, New York, U.S.	
46	Win	42–3–1	Jackie Weber	UD	10	Oct 3, 1949	Rhode Island Auditorium, Providence, Rhode Island, U.S.	
45	Win	41–3–1	Humberto Sierra	UD	10	Sep 21, 1949	Dinner Key Auditorium, Coconut Grove, Florida, U.S.	
44	Win	40–3–1	Clem Custer	UD	8	Jun 6, 1949	Coney Island Velodrome, Brooklyn, New York City, New York, U.S.	
43	Draw	39–3–1	Clem Custer	PTS	10	May 17, 1949	Auditorium, Hartford, Connecticut, U.S.	
42	Win	39–3	Chuck Burton	PTS	10	Apr 11, 1949	Valley Arena, Holyoke, Massachusetts, U.S.	
41	Win	38–3	Jimmy Collins	UD	10	Mar 14, 1949	Arena, Philadelphia, Pennsylvania, U.S.	
40	Win	37–3	Billy Graham	UD	10	Mar 4, 1949	Madison Square Garden, Manhattan, New York City, New York, U.S.	
39	Win	36–3	Chuck Burton	PTS	8	Feb 21, 1949	Arena, Trenton, New Jersey, U.S.	
38	Win	35–3	Humberto Sierra	UD	10	Feb 2, 1949	Manhattan Center, Manhattan, New York City, New York, U.S.	
37	Win	34–3	Bernie Bernard	UD	8	Nov 1, 1948	Eastern Parkway Arena, Brooklyn, New York City, New York, U.S.	
36	Win	33–3	Paulie Jackson	UD	8	Oct 14, 1948	Sunnyside Garden, Sunnyside, Queens, New York City, New York, U.S.	
35	Loss	32–3	Willie Pep	UD	10	Sep 10, 1948	Madison Square Garden, Manhattan, New York City, New York, U.S.	
34	Win	32–2	Paulie Jackson	PTS	10	Jun 21, 1948	Coney Island Velodrome, Brooklyn, New York City, New York, U.S.	
33	Win	31–2	Terry Young	SD	10	Apr 2, 1948	Madison Square Garden, Manhattan, New York City, New York, U.S.	
32	Win	30–2	Terry Young	SD	8	Jan 30, 1948	Madison Square Garden, Manhattan, New York City, New York, U.S.	
31	Win	29–2	Roy Andrews	UD	8	Jan 20, 1948	Sunnyside Garden, Sunnyside, Queens, New York City, New York, U.S.	
30	Win	28–2	Joey Carkido	TKO	7 (8)	Dec 8, 1947	St. Nicholas Arena, Manhattan, New York City, New York, U.S.	
29	Win	27–2	Johnny Dell	SD	8	Nov 11, 1947	Sunnyside Garden, Sunnyside, Queens, New York City, New York, U.S.	
28	Win	26–2	Danny Bartfield	UD	10	Oct 17, 1947	St. Nicholas Arena, Manhattan, New York City, New York, U.S.	
27	Win	25–2	Tommy Mills	PTS	8	Oct 1, 1947	Jamaica Arena, Jamaica, Queens, New York City, New York, U.S.	
26	Win	24–2	Humberto Zavala	UD	8	Aug 19, 1947	MacArthur Stadium, Brooklyn, New York City, New York, U.S.	
25	Win	23–2	Jimmy Warren	TKO	6 (8)	Jul 24, 1947	Fort Hamilton Arena, Brooklyn, New York City, New York, U.S.	
24	Win	22–2	Billy Strauss	UD	8	Jun 16, 1947	Queens, New York City, New York, U.S.	
23	Win	21–2	Bobby Williams	UD	8	May 20, 1947	Sunnyside Garden, New York City, New York, U.S.	
22	Win	20–2	Patsy Giovanelli	PTS	8	Apr 29, 1947	Sunnyside Garden, Sunnyside, Queens, New York City, New York, U.S.	
21	Win	19–2	Joe Carney	PTS	8	Apr 8, 1947	Broadway Arena, Brooklyn, New York City, New York, U.S.	
20	Win	18–2	Mike Konnors	PTS	8	Mar 4, 1957	Broadway Arena, Brooklyn, New York City, New York, U.S.	
19	Win	17–2	Pedro Biesca	PTS	8	Feb 18, 1947	Broadway Arena, Brooklyn, New York City, New York, U.S.	
18	Win	16–2	Joe Holmes	PTS	6	Jan 17, 1947	Madison Square Garden, Manhattan, New York City, New York, U.S.	
17	Win	15–2	Danny Randy	PTS	6	Dec 23, 1946	Broadway Arena, Brooklyn, New York City, New York, U.S.	
16	Win	14–2	Davey Cohen	PTS	6	Dec 3, 1946	Broadway Arena, Brooklyn, New York City, New York, U.S.	
15	Win	13–2	Donald Murray	PTS	6	Sep 30, 1946	St. Nicholas Arena, Manhattan, New York City, New York, U.S.	
14	Win	12–2	Donald Murray	PTS	4	Jun 28, 1946	Madison Square Garden, Manhattan, New York City, New York, U.S.	
13	Loss	11–2	Gaby Ferland	PTS	6	May 11, 1946	Ridgewood Grove, Brooklyn, New York City, New York, U.S.	
12	Win	11–1	Zack Taylor	PTS	6	Apr 11, 1946	Masonic Hall, Highland Park, New Jersey, U.S.	
11	Win	10–1	Gunnar Larsen	PTS	6	Mar 30, 1946	Ridgewood Grove, Brooklyn, New York City, New York, U.S.	
10	Win	9–1	Johnny Phillips	PTS	6	Mar 12, 1946	Broadway Arena, Brooklyn, New York City, New York, U.S.	
9	Win	8–1	Everett Chapman	PTS	4	Mar 2, 1946	Ridgewood Grove, Brooklyn, New York City, New York, U.S.	
8	Win	7–1	Marty Bell	KO	4 (4)	Feb 16, 1946	Ridgewood Grove, Brooklyn, New York City, New York, U.S.	
7	Win	6–1	Joey Fernandez	PTS	6	Nov 13, 1945	Jersey City Gardens, Jersey City, New Jersey, U.S.	
6	Loss	5–1	Butch Charles	PTS	6	Oct 1, 1945	Laurel Garden, Newark, New Jersey, U.S.	
5	Win	5–0	Jimmy Mason	TKO	3 (6)	Sep 25, 1945	Jersey City Gardens, Jersey City, New Jersey, U.S.	
4	Win	4–0	Oscar Williams	PTS	6	Jul 9, 1945	Meadowbrook Bowl, Newark, New Jersey, U.S.	
3	Win	3–0	Al Victoria	KO	1 (4)	Jun 18, 1945	Meadowbrook Bowl, Newark, New Jersey, U.S.	
2	Win	2–0	Jimmy Gause	KO	4 (4)	May 9, 1945	Jersey City Gardens, Jersey City, New Jersey, U.S.	
1	Win	1–0	Sal Giglio	PTS	4	Mar 20, 1945	Jersey City Gardens, Jersey City, New Jersey, U.S.	

== Titles in boxing ==
=== Major world titles ===
- NYSAC lightweight champion (135 lbs)
- NBA (WBA) lightweight champion (135 lbs)

=== The Ring magazine titles ===
- The Ring lightweight champion (135 lbs)

=== Undisputed titles ===
- Undisputed lightweight champion

== See also ==
- Lineal championship
- List of lightweight boxing champions

== Notes ==
Sporting positions
World boxing titles
Preceded by Jimmy Carter	NYSAC lightweight champion March 5, 1954 – November 17, 1954	Succeeded by Jimmy Carter
Preceded by Jimmy Carter	NBA lightweight champion March 5, 1954 – November 17, 1954	Succeeded by Jimmy Carter
Preceded by Jimmy Carter	The Ring lightweight champion March 5, 1954 – November 17, 1954	Succeeded by Jimmy Carter
Preceded by Jimmy Carter	Undisputed lightweight champion March 5, 1954 – November 17, 1954	Succeeded by Jimmy Carter
