= George Araujo =

American boxer

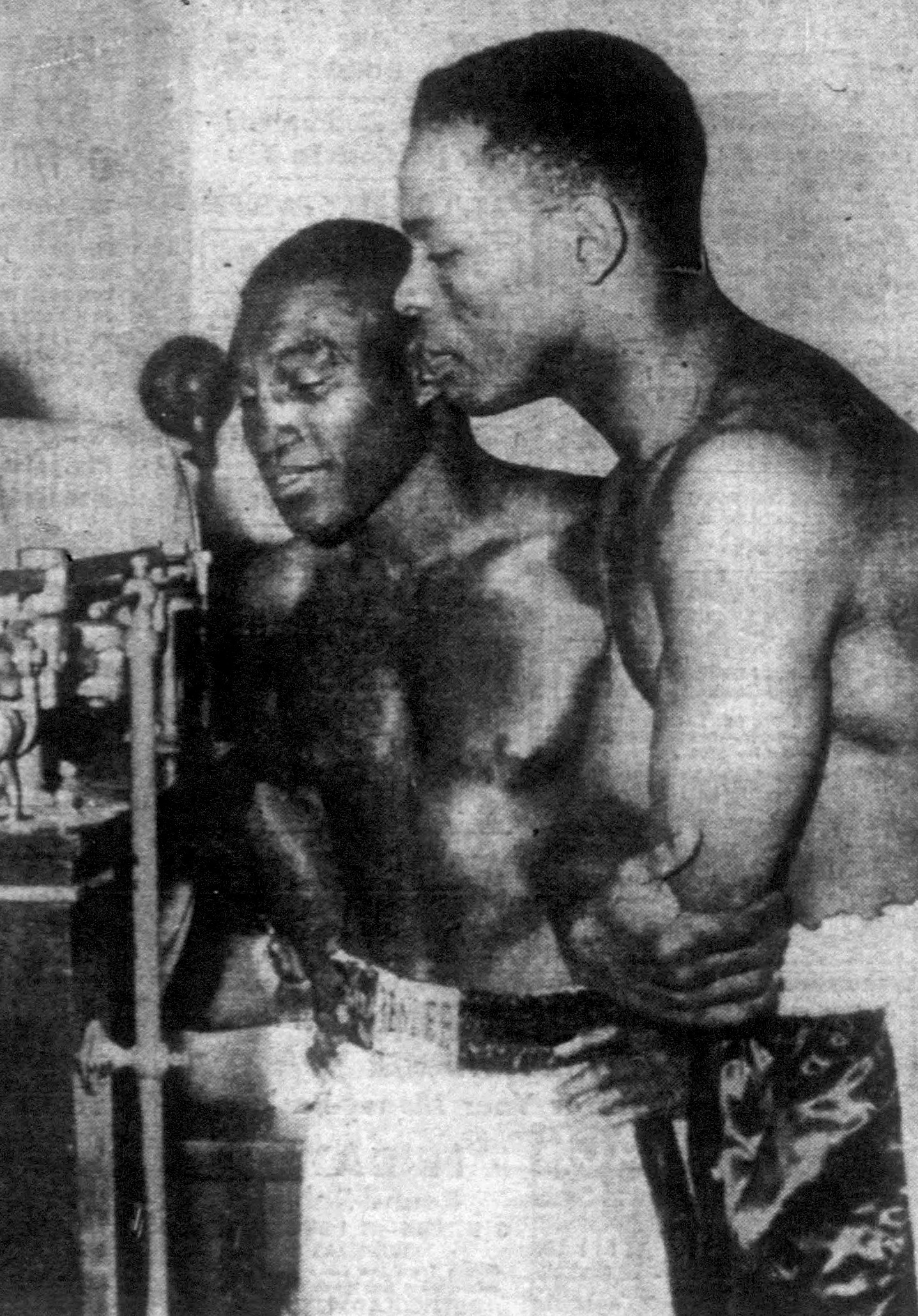
Arujo (right) and Jimmy Carter in 1953.

George Araujo (May 26, 1931 – November 21, 1997) was a lightweight professional boxer from Rhode Island.

== Personal life and professional career ==
Araujo was born in the Fox Point neighborhood of Providence, Rhode Island. He was of Cape Verdean descent.

Araujo made his professional debut in July 1948 and immediate began fighting twice a month. A powerful puncher, Araujo won his first 14 professional fights, all by knockout. By June 1952 Araujo was sporting a record of 45-1, and in June 1953 he fought Jimmy Carter for the world lightweight championship. He lost that fight, and also lost two subsequent fight to Teddy "Redtop" Davis for the then-prestigious New England Lightweight Title. Later after a nearly three-year hiatus Araujo had five fights from August to November 1958, then retired. Araujo's professional record was 58 wins (33 by knockout) and 9 losses with 1 draw. He fought against many of the important small boxers of his era, including Buddy Hayes, Del Flanagan, Harry LaSane, Charley Riley, Sandy Saddler, Arthur King, Paddy DeMarco, Jimmy Carter, Redtop Davis and Tony DeMarco.
