= Teddy Davis =

American boxer

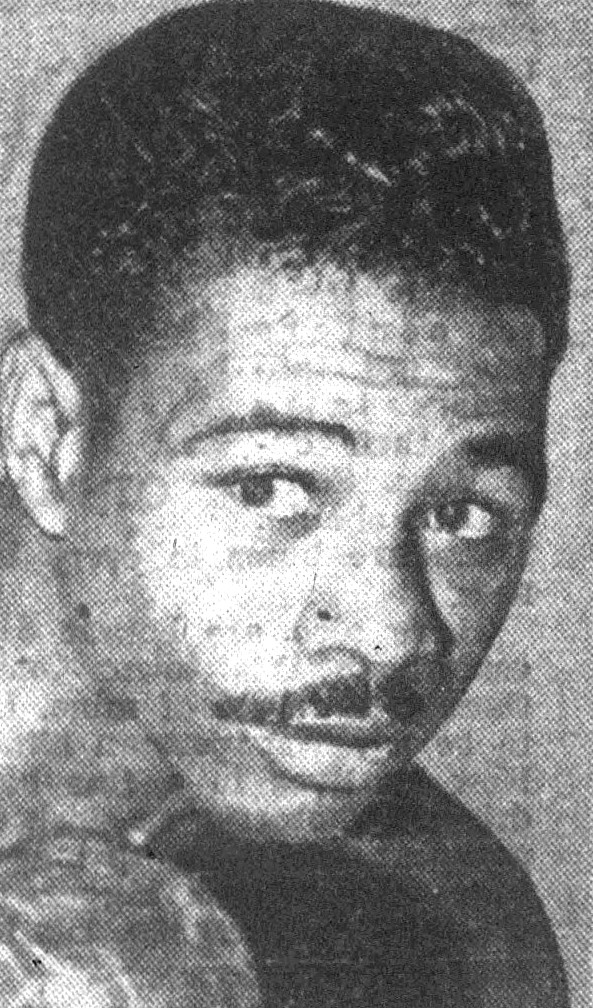
- Davis, circa 1951

Personal information
- Nicknames: "Redtop"; Murray "Sugar" Cain
- Born: Murray Cain; June 23, 1923 Laurens, South Carolina, U.S.
- Died: June 4, 1966 (aged 42) Brooklyn, New York, U.S.
- Height: 5 ft 6 in (168 cm)
- Weight: 136 lb (62 kg)

Boxing career
- Reach: 68 in (173 cm)
- Stance: Orthodox

Boxing record
- Total fights: 152
- Wins: 71
- Win by KO: 23
- Losses: 75
- Draws: 6

Teddy "Redtop" Davis, alias Murray (Sugar) Cain (June 23, 1923 – June 4, 1966), was a featherweight professional boxer from South Carolina.

== Personal life ==
"Redtop" Davis was born in Laurens, South Carolina but at his death was a resident of Brooklyn, New York. He served in the US military, where he made a name for himself fighting under the name "Murray (Sugar) Cain."

== Professional career ==
Davis' career as a professional boxer might not be believable, were it not so well-documented. He made his professional debut in February 1946 and initially fought at least once a month, sometimes twice. By the end of 1946 he had already amassed a dismal record of 1 win and 6 losses with 2 draws. Nevertheless, he kept plugging away, winning a few fights here and there so that by March 1947 he had been selected as an opponent for Sammy Angott, whose record was 82–23–7. He lost that fight by TKO in the 3rd round.

Having begun his career in Ohio in 1947, Davis made a move to the boxing hotspot of New England, where the quality of his opponents improved — as did his own performances. It wasn't long before Davis was fighting the best boxers of his day, and not only that, winning with some regularity. In fact before 1948 was over, Davis had fought the legendary Willie Pep twice — losing both bouts.

In 1949 Davis fought 54–1–3 Eddie Compo and according to Ring Magazine refused to do any punching until the state fight commissioner confronted him in the ring, whereupon Davis peppered Compo at will for two rounds before getting knocked out in the 8th. His purse for that fight was initially withheld, and its resolution is not known.

Davis continued to fight top-flight boxers for money and lower-flight pugs for wins, occasionally stringing together awful losing streaks and impressive winning streaks, and even occasionally pulling off a significant upset, as when he beat Elis Ask (record 31–5–2), Julie Kogon (record 81–37–17), George Dunn (record 33–7–3) and Paddy DeMarco (record 49–4–1) in a three-month period in 1950. Also, in 1952 Davis put together a six-fight winning streak against a collection of opponents with a combined record of 133–47–5. And yet Davis continued to pepper these impressive stretches with occasional, even frequent losses.

Following another six-fight winning streak, this time against fighters with a combined record of 190–57–15, Davis was given a shot at the legendary champion Sandy Saddler, whose record was an incredible 138–13–2. Saddler, it was written, "won as he pleased and it pleased him to cuff and belabor Davis and put him to rout in a bout that through the early rounds looked fairly even." Following the Sadler bout, the good times seemed to end, and Davis finished out his career with a stretch in which he only managed to win 8 out of 33 contests.

At the end of Davis' career, his record was tabulated as 68 wins (22 by knockout), 73 losses, and 5 draws in 146 contests. Along the way he fought a collection of small boxers that included Eddie Compo, Buddy Hayes, Tommy Stenhouse, Nick Stato, Miguel Acevedo, Willie Pep, Dennis Pat Brady, Harry LaSane, Charley Riley, Jackie Graves, Paddy DeMarco, Percy Bassett, Art Aragon, Corky Gonzalez, Arthur King, Federico Plummer, George Araujo, Tommy Collins, Tony DeMarco, Pat Mallane, Paul Jorgensen, Richie Howard, Kenny Lane, and a host of others with impressive records.
