= John Obed Howard =

Canadian boxer

James Obed Howard, alias Richie "Kid" Howard (October 9, 1928 – January 4, 1975), was a lightweight professional boxer from Canada.

== Personal life ==
James Howard was born in Terrace Bay, Nova Scotia, but his residence is given by boxrec.com as Halifax. His birth name was James Obed Howard. He was known as Dicky Howard to family and friends.

Confirmed by his niece, Ruth Bungay.

== Professional career ==
Howard made his professional debut at the age of seventeen on January 1, 1945 with a four rounds points win against Lloyd Martin. After winning his first six fights, Howard lost for the first time on April 1 of 1946, to Isaac Thomas. Fighting mostly in Halifax, Howard had compiled an impressive record of 24-4 before making an unproductive foray into New York and New Jersey. He returned to Halifax with a record of 26-6 to face Crosby Irvine for the Maritime Lightweight Championship on October 22, 1949, which he won with a second-round knockout. Howard continued to face tougher competition, making further ventures into New York and fighting such names as Buddy Hayes, Ralph Dupas, Dennis Pat Brady, Kenny Lane, Redtop Davis, Glen Flanagan, and Willie Toweel. Howard retired after a July 1959 loss to Tommy Tibbs, having compiled a career record of 77 wins (17 by knockout), 26 losses, and 5 draws.
