= Buddy Hayes =

American boxer

Timothy Hayes, alias Buddy Hayes (April 27, 1926 – November 26, 1990) was an American featherweight professional boxer from Massachusetts.

== Personal life ==
Buddy Hayes was a native of Boston. He married Marie Murphy in August 1948. The couple had two daughters, Bonnie and Franci.

== Professional career ==
Hayes made his professional debut on October 19, 1944 with a points win over Bob Reardon. Hayes lost for the first time in only his third professional fight, against the equally young and inexperienced Nick Stato. But young Hayes continued to fight frequently (in December of '44 he fought six times) and racking up more wins, many by knockout. By January 1946, when Hayes fought for (and won) the vacant New England Featherweight Title, his record was 39-5. Hayes fought generally around 127-128 lbs, but later in his career he fought quite frequently as a lightweight. Before his career was over Hayes had fought such notable opponents as Spider Armstrong, Jackie Weber, Jock Leslie, Dennis Pat Brady, Phil Terranova, Redtop Davis, Steve Marcello, Harry LaSane, Hermie Freeman, George Araujo, Tommy Collins, and Frankie Fay. By the time of his retirement in 1950, Hayes had compiled a record of 93 wins (48 by knockout) and 37 losses with 3 draws.
