= Jimmy Carter (boxer) =

American boxer

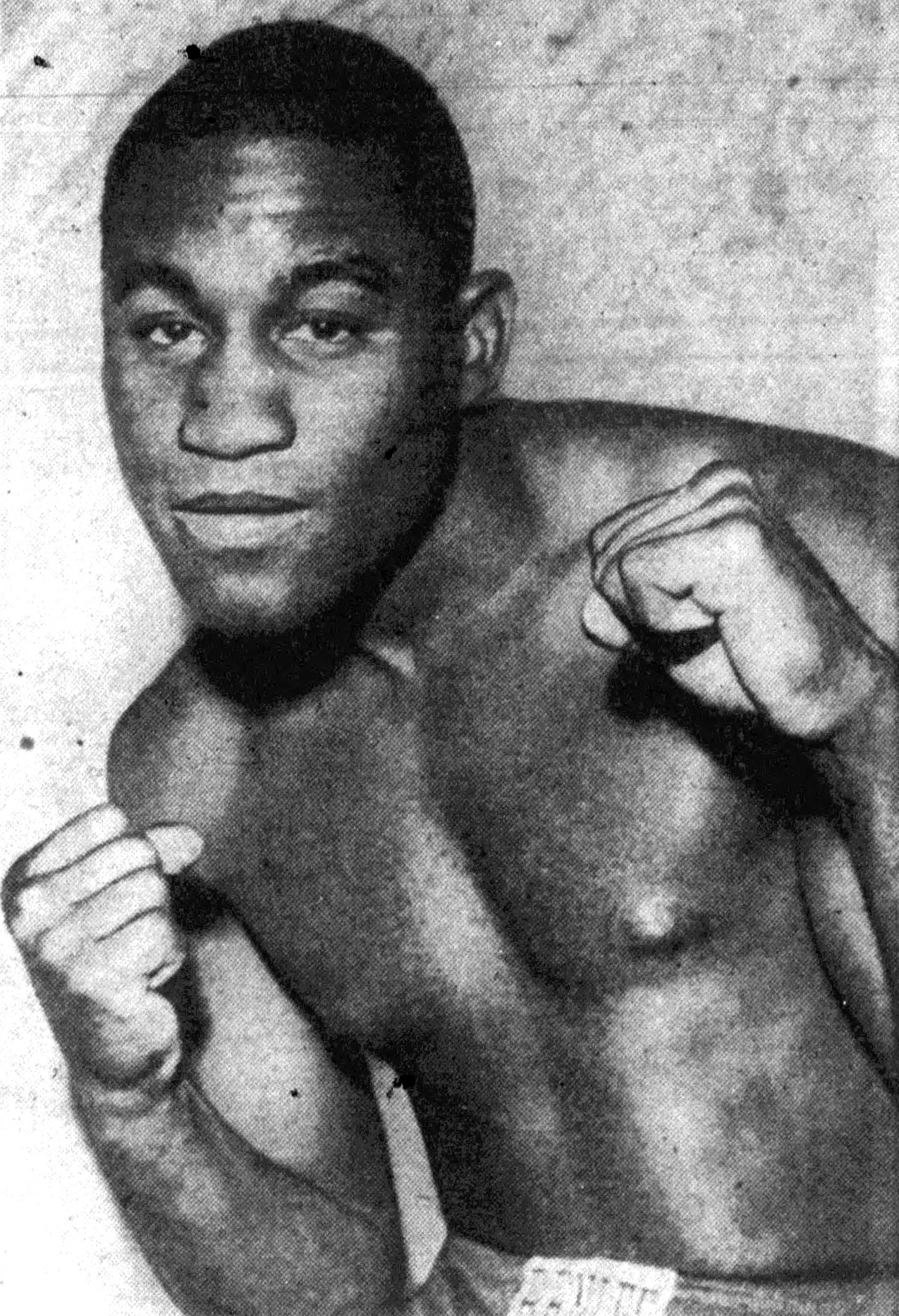
- Carter, circa 1951

Personal information
- Born: James Walter Carter; December 15, 1923 Aiken, South Carolina, U.S.
- Died: September 21, 1994 (aged 70)
- Height: 5 ft 6 in (168 cm)
- Weight: Lightweight

Boxing career
- Reach: 68 in (173 cm)
- Stance: Orthodox

Boxing record
- Total fights: 125
- Wins: 85
- Win by KO: 34
- Losses: 31
- Draws: 9

James Walter Carter (December 15, 1923 – September 21, 1994) was a three-time Undisputed World Lightweight Champion between 1951 and 1955. His managers included Jimmy Roche and Willie Ketchum. He was inducted into the International Boxing Hall of Fame in 2000. Carter's loss to Lauro Salas in 1952 and his loss to Paddy DeMarco in 1954 were each named Ring Magazine upset of the year. His professional record was 80-31-9 with 32 knockouts.

== Early life ==
James Walter Carter was born on December 15, 1923, in Aiken, South Carolina, but his family moved to New York when he was nine. Carter began to use his fists defending himself on the streets of Harlem, but later received training at a Catholic Boys Club, making his amateur debut at the age of fourteen. Beginning as a professional fighter in New York in 1946, he won 22 of his first 26 fights.

== First taking the World Lightweight Championship, May 1951 ==
On May 25, 1951, Carter took the World Lightweight Championship from reigning champion Ike Williams in a fourteenth-round TKO at Madison Square Garden. Williams was down in the fifth, tenth, and fourteenth rounds. Carter knocked Williams to the mat a total of four times, and was leading the scorecards of all three officials before the bout was stopped. In the fifth round, Williams was dropped to the canvas for a five count, and never was the same. Surprisingly, Carter was not at all well known at the time of the bout, and his victory was considered an upset.

In his first title defense before 7,251 fans on November 14, 1951, he went up against Art Aragon at the Olympic Stadium in Los Angeles, winning in a fifteen-round unanimous decision. Aragon was down in both the sixth and fifteenth rounds, but claimed after the fight that a left to his jaw in the twelfth is what finally did him in. It was an easy win for Carter, as Aragon lacked the skills to take down the world champion. Aragon took a severe beating in the last four rounds that sealed the victory for Carter. Carter had oddly lost to Aragon on August 28 of that year in a fifteen-round split decision at the same location. Some boxing writers speculated he may have thrown the fight on purpose. Some even believed Carter was controlled by mafia kingpin Frankie Carbo.

He lost the title on May 14, 1952, against Lauro Salas at the Olympic Auditorium in Los Angeles in a fifteen-round split decision that was a jarring upset for many. The decision was a controversial one, and many boxing writers disagreed with the official' final ruling for Sales.

== Taking the World Lightweight Championship for the second time, October 1952 ==
Carter took the World Lightweight Championship for a second time on October 15, 1952, against Mexican national Lauro Salas in a fifteen around unanimous decision at the Chicago Stadium before a small crowd of 5,283. In a sweeping victory, which saw far more damage to Salas, the officials gave all but two of the rounds to Carter and his terrific left hook.

On April 24, 1953, he staged a title defense against Tommy Collins before a substantial crowd of 12,477 at Boston Garden, winning in a fourth-round TKO. Collins' corner men ended the fight after their boxer had been knocked to the canvas ten times in the final two rounds. Both the TV audience and the crowd, who were largely fans of Collins, protested the continuation of such a brutal, and one sided bout. He next fought George Araujo on June 12, 1953, in a lightweight world title bout at Madison Square Garden, winning in a thirteenth-round TKO.

On March 5, 1954, Carter lost his second World Lightweight Championship against Paddy DeMarco in a fifteen-round unanimous decision at New York's Madison Square Garden. DeMarco, a 4–1, underdog won the decision with ease rocking the crowd of 5,730 with a remarkable upset. Carter tried for a knockout throughout the bout, but DeMarco scored continuously with fleet footwork and a punishing left. Both judges gave DeMarco nine rounds, with the referee giving him seven.

== Taking the World Lightweight Championship for third and final time, November 1954 ==
On November 17, 1954, Carter took the lightweight championship back from Paddy DeMarco in a fifteen-round TKO at the Cow Palace, in Daily City, California. DeMarco was down in the ninth and fourteenth rounds. Carter had lost his title to DeMarco only seven months earlier.

Carter lost the title for the last time to Wallace "Bud" Smith at Boston Garden in a fifteen-round split decision on June 29, 1955. Though the bout was close, Carter took one of the worst beatings of his career from Smith requiring fifteen stitches over his eyes. Smith himself needed three stitches to fix a cut over his own eye. The crowd of only 1,983 saw a razor close, hotly contested title match. Two of the officials gave a margin of only one point between the two boxers.

Carter died of a heart attack on September 21, 1994, at the age of 70.

== Professional boxing record ==
125 fights	85 wins	31 losses
By knockout	34	3
By decision	51	28
Draws	9	

No.	Result	Record	Opponent	Type	Round	Date	Location	Notes
125	Loss	85–31–9	Luis Garduno	PTS	10	Apr 1, 1960	Rendezvous Park, Mesa, Arizona, U.S.	
124	Loss	85–30–9	Jimmy Grow	UD	10	Feb 25, 1960	Fairgrounds Arena, Boise, Idaho, U.S.	
123	Loss	85–29–9	Art Ramponi	PTS	10	Nov 24, 1959	Auditorium, Oakland, California, U.S.	
122	Win	85–28–9	Kildo Nunez	KO	4 (10)	Nov 10, 1959	Auditorium, Richmond, California, U.S.	
121	Win	84–28–9	Jimmy Smith	KO	3 (10)	Oct 13, 1959	Auditorium, Richmond, California, U.S.	
120	Win	83–28–9	Kildo Nunez	PTS	10	Aug 11, 1959	San Jose, California, U.S.	
119	Loss	82–28–9	Rudy Jordan	TKO	6 (10)	Sep 23, 1958	Memorial Auditorium, Fresno, California, U.S.	
118	Loss	82–27–9	Al Nevarez	UD	10	Sep 9, 1958	Plaza de Toros, Ciudad Juarez, Chihuahua, Mexico	
117	Win	82–26–9	Jimmy Grow	TKO	7 (10)	Jul 19, 1958	Legion Stadium, Hollywood, California, U.S.	
116	Loss	81–26–9	Joey Lopes	SD	10	Mar 11, 1958	Memorial Auditorium, Sacramento, California, U.S.	
115	Loss	81–25–9	Joey Lopes	UD	10	Jan 14, 1958	Memorial Auditorium, Sacramento, California, U.S.	
114	Loss	81–24–9	Willie Toweel	PTS	10	Oct 8, 1957	Royal Albert Hall, Kensington, London, England	
113	Win	81–23–9	Mickey Northrup	UD	10	Sep 7, 1957	Legion Stadium, Hollywood, California, U.S.	
112	Win	80–23–9	Buddy McDonald	UD	10	May 23, 1957	Interstate Fairgrounds, Spokane, California, U.S.	
111	Loss	79–23–9	Larry Boardman	TKO	8 (10)	Sep 11, 1956	Boston Garden, Boston, Massachusetts, U.S.	
110	Win	79–22–9	Lauro Salas	UD	10	Jun 21, 1956	Olympic Auditorium, Los Angeles, California, U.S.	
109	Loss	78–22–9	Art Aragon	UD	10	May 3, 1956	Olympic Auditorium, Los Angeles, California, U.S.	
108	Win	78–21–9	Don Jordan	UD	10	Mar 29, 1956	Olympic Auditorium, Los Angeles, California, U.S.	
107	Win	77–21–9	Phil Burton	PTS	10	Mar 5, 1956	The Tower, Quebec City, Quebec, Canada	
106	Loss	76–21–9	Cisco Andrade	SD	10	Feb 1, 1956	Chicago Stadium, Chicago, Illinois, U.S.	
105	Loss	76–20–9	Wallace Bud Smith	UD	15	Oct 19, 1955	Cincinnati Gardens, Cincinnati, Ohio, U.S.	For NYSAC, NBA, and The Ring lightweight titles
104	Loss	76–19–9	Wallace Bud Smith	SD	15	Jun 29, 1955	Boston Garden, Boston, Massachusetts, U.S.	Lost NYSAC, NBA, and The Ring lightweight titles
103	Loss	76–18–9	Orlando Zulueta	SD	10	Apr 20, 1955	Uline Arena, Washington, District of Columbia, U.S.	
102	Draw	76–17–9	Tony DeMarco	PTS	10	Feb 11, 1955	Boston Garden, Boston, Massachusetts, U.S.	
101	Win	76–17–8	Bobby Woods	UD	10	Jan 26, 1955	Coliseum, Spokane, California, U.S.	
100	Win	75–17–8	Paddy DeMarco	TKO	15 (15)	Nov 17, 1954	Cow Palace, Daly City, California, U.S.	Won NYSAC, NBA, and The Ring lightweight titles
99	Win	74–17–8	Freddie Herman	UD	10	Sep 22, 1954	Cow Palace, Daly City, California, U.S.	
98	Win	73–17–8	Glen Flanagan	UD	10	Aug 4, 1954	Chicago Stadium, Chicago, Illinois, U.S.	
97	Win	72–17–8	Charley Riley	KO	2 (10)	Jun 2, 1954	Madison Square Garden, New York City, New York, U.S.	
96	Loss	71–17–8	Paddy DeMarco	UD	15	Mar 5, 1954	Madison Square Garden, New York City, New York, U.S.	Lost NYSAC, NBA, and The Ring lightweight titles
95	Win	71–16–8	Billy Lauderdale	UD	10	Feb 8, 1954	Nassau, Bahamas	
94	Win	70–16–8	Armand Savoie	KO	5 (15)	Nov 11, 1953	Forum, Montreal, Quebec, Canada	Retained NYSAC, NBA, and The Ring lightweight titles
93	Win	69–16–8	Carlos Chavez	TKO	6 (10)	Oct 15, 1953	Olympic Auditorium, Los Angeles, California, U.S.	
92	Win	68–16–8	Abdelkader Ben Miloud	TKO	8 (10)	Sep 28, 1953	War Memorial Arena, Johnstown, Pennsylvania, U.S.	
91	Loss	67–16–8	Johnny Cunningham	SD	10	Sep 12, 1953	Bayfront Park Auditorium, Miami, Florida, U.S.	
90	Win	67–15–8	George Araujo	TKO	13 (15)	Jun 12, 1953	Madison Square Garden, New York City, New York, U.S.	Retained NYSAC, NBA, and The Ring lightweight titles
89	Win	66–15–8	Tommy Collins	TKO	4 (15)	Feb 24, 1953	Boston Garden, Boston, Massachusetts, U.S.	Retained NYSAC, NBA, and The Ring lightweight titles
88	Loss	65–15–8	Armand Savoie	SD	10	Feb 16, 1953	Forum, Montreal, Quebec, Canada	
87	Loss	65–14–8	Eddie Chavez	SD	10	Jan 12, 1953	Winterland Arena, San Francisco, California, U.S.	
86	Draw	65–13–8	Freddie Herman	MD	10	Dec 16, 1952	Memorial Auditorium, Sacramento, California, U.S.	
85	Win	65–13–7	Archie Whitewater	UD	10	Dec 9, 1952	Auditorium, Oakland, California, U.S.	
84	Win	64–13–7	Lauro Salas	UD	15	Oct 15, 1952	Chicago Stadium, Chicago, Illinois, U.S.	Won NYSAC, NBA, and The Ring lightweight titles
83	Win	63–13–7	Basil Marie	UD	10	Sep 1, 1952	Dartmouth Ball Park, Dartmouth, Nova Scotia, Canada	
82	Loss	62–13–7	Lauro Salas	SD	15	May 14, 1952	Olympic Auditorium, Los Angeles, California, U.S.	Lost NYSAC, NBA, and The Ring lightweight titles
81	Win	62–12–7	Lauro Salas	UD	15	Apr 1, 1952	Olympic Auditorium, Los Angeles, California, U.S.	Retained NYSAC, NBA, and The Ring lightweight titles
80	Win	61–12–7	Luther Rawlings	SD	10	Mar 12, 1952	Chicago Stadium, Chicago, Illinois, U.S.	
79	Win	60–12–7	Allan McFater	UD	9	Feb 5, 1952	Maple Leaf Gardens, Toronto, Ontario, Canada	
78	Win	59–12–7	Mario Trigo	MD	10	Jan 21, 1952	Arena, Philadelphia, Pennsylvania, U.S.	
77	Win	58–12–7	Art Aragon	UD	15	Nov 14, 1951	Olympic Auditorium, Los Angeles, California, U.S.	Retained NYSAC, NBA, and The Ring lightweight titles
76	Loss	57–12–7	Art Aragon	SD	10	Aug 28, 1951	Olympic Auditorium, Los Angeles, California, U.S.	
75	Win	57–11–7	Mario Trigo	UD	10	Aug 14, 1951	Olympic Auditorium, Los Angeles, California, U.S.	
74	Win	56–11–7	Del Flanagan	RTD	6 (10)	Aug 2, 1951	Auditorium, Minneapolis, Minnesota, U.S.	
73	Win	55–11–7	Enrique Bolanos	TKO	7 (10)	Jul 10, 1951	Olympic Auditorium, Los Angeles, California, U.S.	
72	Win	54–11–7	Ronnie Harper	KO	5 (10)	Jul 2, 1951	I.M.A. Auditorium, Flint, Michigan, U.S.	
71	Win	53–11–7	Chick Boucher	KO	4 (10)	Jun 18, 1951	Casino, Fall River, Massachusetts, U.S.	
70	Win	52–11–7	Ike Williams	TKO	14 (15)	May 25, 1951	Madison Square Garden, New York City, New York, U.S.	Won NYSAC, NBA, and The Ring lightweight titles
69	Loss	51–11–7	Percy Bassett	UD	10	Mar 5, 1951	Arena, Philadelphia, Pennsylvania, U.S.	
68	Win	51–10–7	Percy Bassett	UD	10	Feb 7, 1951	St. Nicholas Arena, New York City, New York, U.S.	
67	Loss	50–10–7	Calvin Smith	SD	10	Jan 30, 1951	Arena, Philadelphia, Pennsylvania, U.S.	
66	Draw	50–9–7	Tommy Campbell	UD	10	Oct 6, 1950	Coliseum Arena, New Orleans, Louisiana, U.S.	
65	Win	50–9–6	Jesse Underwood	UD	10	Jul 25, 1950	Parkway Arena, Cincinnati, Ohio, U.S.	
64	Win	49–9–6	Wallace Bud Smith	UD	10	Mar 28, 1950	Music Hall Arena, Cincinnati, Ohio, U.S.	
63	Loss	48–9–6	Rudy Cruz	MD	10	Nov 29, 1949	Olympic Auditorium, Los Angeles, California, U.S.	
62	Win	48–8–6	Bernie Hall	PTS	12	Oct 28, 1949	West Melbourne Stadium, Melbourne, Victoria, Australia	
61	Win	47–8–6	Charlie Ashenden	KO	4 (12)	Oct 4, 1949	Sydney Stadium, Sydney, New South Wales, Australia	
60	Loss	46–8–6	Norm Gent	PTS	12	Sep 16, 1949	West Melbourne Stadium, Melbourne, Victoria, Australia	
59	Win	46–7–6	Mario Trigo	KO	6 (10)	May 23, 1949	Ocean Park Arena, Santa Monica, California, U.S.	
58	Win	45–7–6	Archie Whitewater	KO	6 (10)	Apr 22, 1949	National Hall, San Francisco, California, U.S.	
57	Win	44–7–6	Nick Diaz	TKO	6 (10)	Apr 4, 1949	Ocean Park Arena, Santa Monica, California, U.S.	
56	Win	43–7–6	Talmadge Bussey	PTS	10	Jan 31, 1949	Arena Gardens, Detroit, Michigan, U.S.	
55	Win	42–7–6	Harold Jones	SD	10	Jan 17, 1949	St. Nicholas Arena, New York City, New York, U.S.	
54	Win	41–7–6	Louis Joyce	UD	10	Dec 6, 1948	Valley Arena, Holyoke, Massachusetts, U.S.	
53	Loss	40–7–6	Sonny Boy West	UD	10	Nov 1, 1948	Coliseum, Baltimore, Maryland, U.S.	
52	Win	40–6–6	Issac Jenkins	PTS	8 (10)	Sep 27, 1948	Arena, New Haven, Connecticut, U.S.	
51	Win	39–6–6	Joey Angelo	UD	10	Aug 30, 1948	Century Stadium, West Springfield, Massachusetts, U.S.	
50	Win	38–6–6	George Bradford Smith	UD	10	Aug 9, 1948	Century Stadium, West Springfield, Massachusetts, U.S.	
49	Win	37–6–6	Julie Kogon	RTD	7 (10)	Jul 26, 1948	Century Stadium, West Springfield, Massachusetts, U.S.	
48	Draw	36–6–6	Woody Winslow	PTS	10	Jul 20, 1948	Jerome Stadium, Bronx, New York City, New York, U.S.	
47	Win	36–6–5	Wilfredo Miro	PTS	10	Jul 12, 1948	Century Stadium, West Springfield, Massachusetts, U.S.	
46	Win	35–6–5	Phil Burton	PTS	10	Jun 29, 1948	Century Stadium, West Springfield, Massachusetts, U.S.	
45	Loss	34–6–5	Bobby McQuillar	PTS	10	May 21, 1948	Pelican Stadium, New Orleans, Louisiana, U.S.	
44	Win	34–5–5	Willie Russell	PTS	10	Apr 17, 1948	Music Hall Arena, Cincinnati, Ohio, U.S.	
43	Win	33–5–5	Calvin Smith	PTS	8	Mar 29, 1948	Boston Garden, Boston, Massachusetts, U.S.	
42	Win	32–5–5	Charley Cabby Lewis	PTS	10	Mar 9, 1948	Auditorium, Hartford, Connecticut, U.S.	
41	Win	31–5–5	Thompson Harmon	PTS	8	Jan 27, 1948	Auditorium, Hartford, Connecticut, U.S.	
40	Draw	30–5–5	Al Pennino	PTS	8	Dec 9, 1947	Auditorium, Hartford, Connecticut, U.S.	
39	Loss	30–5–4	Charley Cabey Lewis	TKO	7 (10)	Nov 18, 1947	Auditorium, Hartford, Connecticut, U.S.	
38	Draw	30–4–4	Danny Williams	PTS	8	Oct 27, 1947	Arena, New Haven, Connecticut, U.S.	
37	Draw	30–4–3	Danny Williams	PTS	8	Sep 29, 1947	Arena, New Haven, Connecticut, U.S.	
36	Win	30–4–2	Patsy Spataro	RTD	7 (8)	Sep 16, 1947	Jerome Stadium, Bronx, New York City, New York, U.S.	
35	Win	29–4–2	Henry Polowitzer	PTS	8	Sep 8, 1947	Arena, New Haven, Connecticut, U.S.	
34	Win	28–4–2	Matt Parker	TKO	8 (8)	Aug 11, 1947	Fair Grounds Arena, Allentown, Pennsylvania, U.S.	
33	Win	27–4–2	Thompson Harmon	TKO	5 (6)	Jul 22, 1947	Jerome Stadium, Bronx, New York City, New York, U.S.	
32	Draw	26–4–2	Sandy Saddler	MD	10	Jun 3, 1947	Griffith Stadium, Washington, District of Columbia, U.S.	
31	Win	26–4–1	Mario Chico Morales	KO	7 (8)	May 27, 1947	Jerome Stadium, Bronx, New York City, New York, U.S.	
30	Win	25–4–1	Johnny Johnson	PTS	8	May 12, 1947	St. Nicholas Arena, New York City, New York, U.S.	
29	Loss	24–4–1	Joe Brown	PTS	10	Apr 18, 1947	Coliseum Arena, New Orleans, Louisiana, U.S.	
28	Win	24–3–1	Walter Stevens	PTS	6	Mar 28, 1947	Madison Square Garden, New York City, New York, U.S.	
27	Win	23–3–1	Eddie White	RTD	3 (8)	Mar 18, 1947	Park Arena, Bronx, New York City, New York, U.S.	
26	Win	22–3–1	Walter Cabey Lewis	PTS	6	Feb 24, 1947	St. Nicholas Arena, New York City, New York, U.S.	
25	Win	21–3–1	Leo Methot	PTS	6	Jan 20, 1947	Forum, Montreal, Quebec, Canada	
24	Win	20–3–1	Walter Keene	PTS	8	Jan 7, 1947	Park Arena, Bronx, New York City, New York, U.S.	
23	Win	19–3–1	Ruby Garcia	TKO	3 (8)	Dec 17, 1946	Park Arena, Bronx, New York City, New York, U.S.	
22	Win	18–3–1	Eddie Smith	PTS	8	Dec 2, 1946	St. Nicholas Arena, New York City, New York, U.S.	
21	Win	17–3–1	Billy Williams	TKO	7 (8)	Nov 5, 1946	Park Arena, Bronx, New York City, New York, U.S.	
20	Win	16–3–1	Charley Noel	PTS	8	Oct 19, 1946	Forum Arena, Bronx, New York City, New York, U.S.	
19	Win	15–3–1	Paul Midiri	UD	8	Oct 2, 1946	Jamaica Arena, Jamaica, Queens, New York City, New York, U.S.	
18	Loss	14–3–1	Danny Carabella	SD	8	Sep 16, 1946	Coney Island Velodrome, Brooklyn, New York City, New York, U.S.	
17	Win	14–2–1	Johnny Johnson	KO	4 (6)	Sep 5, 1946	Sterling Oval, Bronx, New York City, New York, U.S.	
16	Win	13–2–1	Al Turner	KO	5 (6)	Aug 26, 1946	Coney Island Velodrome, Brooklyn, New York City, New York, U.S.	
15	Loss	12–2–1	Ray Lewis	PTS	6	Aug 12, 1946	Sterling Oval, Bronx, New York City, New York, U.S.	
14	Draw	12–1–1	Paul Midiri	PTS	6	Jul 29, 1946	Queensboro Arena, Long Island City, Queens, New York City, New York, U.S.	
13	Win	12–1	Joey Monteiro	PTS	6	Jul 9, 1946	Crystal Arena, Norwalk, Connecticut, U.S.	
12	Win	11–1	Lou Langley	KO	1 (6)	Jun 12, 1946	Forum Arena, Bronx, New York City, New York, U.S.	
11	Loss	10–1	Johnny LaRusso	PTS	4	May 31, 1946	Madison Square Garden, New York City, New York, U.S.	
10	Win	10–0	Leo LeBrun	PTS	6	May 28, 1946	Park Arena, Bronx, New York City, New York, U.S.	
9	Win	9–0	Lou Daniels	KO	3 (?)	May 7, 1946	Park Arena, Bronx, New York City, New York, U.S.	
8	Win	8–0	Johnny LaRusso	PTS	6	May 1, 1946	Jamaica Arena, Jamaica, Queens, New York City, New York, U.S.	
7	Win	7–0	George Wright	PTS	6	Apr 19, 1946	St. Nicholas Arena, New York City, New York, U.S.	
6	Win	6–0	Clifton Bordies	KO	1 (4)	Apr 16, 1946	Park Arena, Bronx, New York City, New York, U.S.	
5	Win	5–0	Ray Morris	KO	4 (6)	Apr 8, 1946	Laurel Garden, Newark, New Jersey, U.S.	
4	Win	4–0	Joe Krikis	PTS	4	Apr 5, 1946	St. Nicholas Arena, New York City, New York, U.S.	
3	Win	3–0	Harry Diduck	PTS	6	Mar 28, 1946	Armory, Orange, New Jersey, U.S.	
2	Win	2–0	Richard Bohri	TKO	4 (6)	Mar 21, 1946	Armory, Orange, New Jersey, U.S.	
1	Win	1–0	Clifton Bordies	PTS	4	Mar 14, 1946	Armory, Orange, New Jersey, U.S.	

== Titles in boxing ==
=== Major world titles ===
- NYSAC lightweight champion (135 lbs) (3×)
- NBA (WBA) lightweight champion (135 lbs) (3×)

=== The Ring magazine titles ===
- The Ring lightweight champion (135 lbs) (3×)

=== Undisputed titles ===
- Undisputed lightweight champion (3×)

== See also ==
- Lineal championship
- List of lightweight boxing champions

== Notes ==
Achievements
Preceded by Ike Williams	World Lightweight Champion; 25 May 1951 – 14 May 1952	Succeeded by Lauro Salas
Preceded by Lauro Salas	World Lightweight Champion; 15 October 1952 – 5 March 1954	Succeeded by Paddy DeMarco
Preceded by Paddy DeMarco	World Lightweight Champion; 17 November 1954 – 29 June 1955	Succeeded by Wallace (Bud) Smith
