= Del Flanagan =

American boxer

Del Flanagan (November 6, 1928 – December 26, 2003) was a middleweight professional boxer from Minnesota, USA.

== Personal life ==
Flanagan was a native of St Paul. He and his brother Glen were known as the Fighting Flanagan Brothers. Both have been inducted into the World Boxing Hall of Fame and Minnesota boxing hall of fame joining the Gibbons brothers, Mike and Tommy, also from Saint Paul.

== Professional boxing career ==
Flanagan began his career with 40 straight wins before drawing with Johnny De Fazio in March 1950. He remained undefeated until his 53rd fight, a loss to Tommy Campbell in June 1951. On April 11, 1952, Flanagan upset Arthur King via 10 round unanimous decision. By the end of his career Flanagan had amassed an impressive record of 105 wins (38 by knockout) and 22 losses, with 2 draws. Before it was over he had fought such big names as Tim Dalton, Johnny DeFazio, Sandy Saddler, Jackie Graves, Beau Jack, Tommy Campbell, Jimmy Carter, Arthur King, Willie Pastrano, Johnny Saxton, Gene Fullmer, Kid Gavilán, Joey Giardello and Duane Horsman. His highest ranking was #2 during the 1950s, but he never had a title shot.
