= Statue of Tony DeMarco =

Statue in Boston, Massachusetts, U.S.

- Artist: Harry Weber
- Year: 2012
- Medium: Bronze sculpture
- Subject: Tony DeMarco
- Location: Boston, Massachusetts, U.S.; 42.362501°N 71.055561°W

A statue of Tony DeMarco by Harry Weber is installed in Boston's North End, in the U.S. state of Massachusetts. DeMarco attended the bronze sculpture's dedication ceremony in 2012.

== See also ==
- 2012 in art
