= Dennis Pat Brady =

American boxer

Denis Pat Brady (January 18, 1928 – August 6, 2010) was a lightweight professional boxer from Connecticut.

== Personal life ==
Brady, a resident of Bronx, New York, was born in New York, New York.

== Professional career ==
Brady made his professional debut against Eddie Reardon on June 20, 1944. His first fight ended with a 5th round knockout win. From there it was off to the races, as Brady won his first 16 fights before suffering a draw against Nick Stato. Brady avenged that draw against Stato in his very next fight, and by January 1946 was sporting a dazzling 24-0-1 record. It was on the 29th of that month that Brady lost for the first time, an 8 round points loss to Victor Flores. As his career unfolded Brady faced such competition as Spider Armstrong, Sal Bartolo, Miguel Acevedo, Jackie Weber, Redtop Davis, Sandy Saddler, Iggy Vaccari, and Paddy DeMarco. By the time of his retirement in March 1956, Brady had compiled a professional record of 79 wins (35 by knockout), 25 losses, and 6 draws.
