= Tony DeMarco =

American boxer (1932–2021)

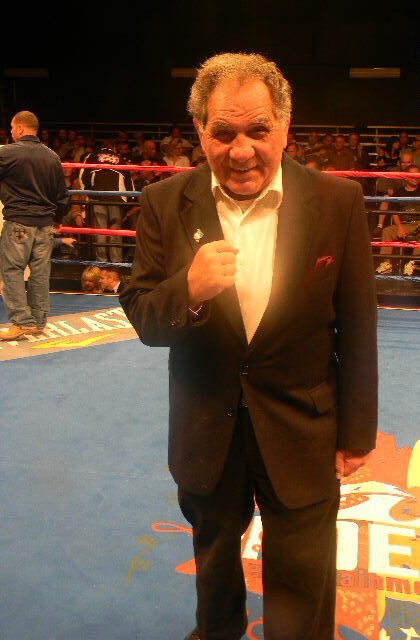
- DeMarco in 2010

Personal information
- Nicknames: Boston Bomber, The Flame and Fury of Fleet Street
- Born: Leonardo Liotta; January 14, 1932 Boston, Massachusetts, U.S.
- Died: October 11, 2021 (aged 89) Boston, Massachusetts, U.S.
- Height: 5 ft 5 in (1.65 m)
- Weight: Welterweight

Boxing career
- Stance: Orthodox

Boxing record
- Total fights: 71
- Wins: 58
- Win by KO: 33
- Losses: 12
- Draws: 1

Tony DeMarco (January 14, 1932 – October 11, 2021), born Leonardo Liotta, was an American boxer and Undisputed World Welterweight Champion. Born to Sicilian immigrants from Sciacca (AG), Vincent and Giacomina, DeMarco grew up in the North End neighborhood of Boston.

DeMarco was also, for a short time, a resident of Phoenix, Arizona, where he was a business owner and where he suffered the death of his young son by way of a car-bicycle collision.

== Career ==
Due to the minimum age of eighteen, in order to box professionally, Liotta used the baptismal certificate of Tony DeMarco so that he could compete. DeMarco had his first professional fight when he was sixteen years old. On October 21, 1948, he knocked out Mestor Jones in one round.

DeMarco fought the top fighters in his division during the 1950s and defeated top contenders and champions like Paddy DeMarco, Teddy "Red Top" Davis, Chico Vejar, and Don Jordan. The highlight of his career came on April 1, 1955, when he scored a technical knock out (TKO) over Johnny Saxton in the 14th round of their title bout to capture the world's welterweight title.

Despite winning many bouts to become champion, he is best remembered for his two championship matches with hall of famer Carmen Basilio in 1955. Both fights were toe to toe slugfests with several ebbs and flows that kept the fans at the edges of their seats. Both fights ended in the 12th round with DeMarco suffering a TKO. In their first bout, DeMarco was the defending champion. He risked his title by taking on Basilio, who was the top ranked contender. Although Basilio prevailed, the fight was so exciting that the pair were rematched. The second fight was almost a carbon copy of the first with Basilio wearing down DeMarco, but not before a wicked DeMarco left hook had Basilio out on his feet. DeMarco was unable to capitalize on this advantage and lost the match on a 12-round TKO.

=== Legacy ===
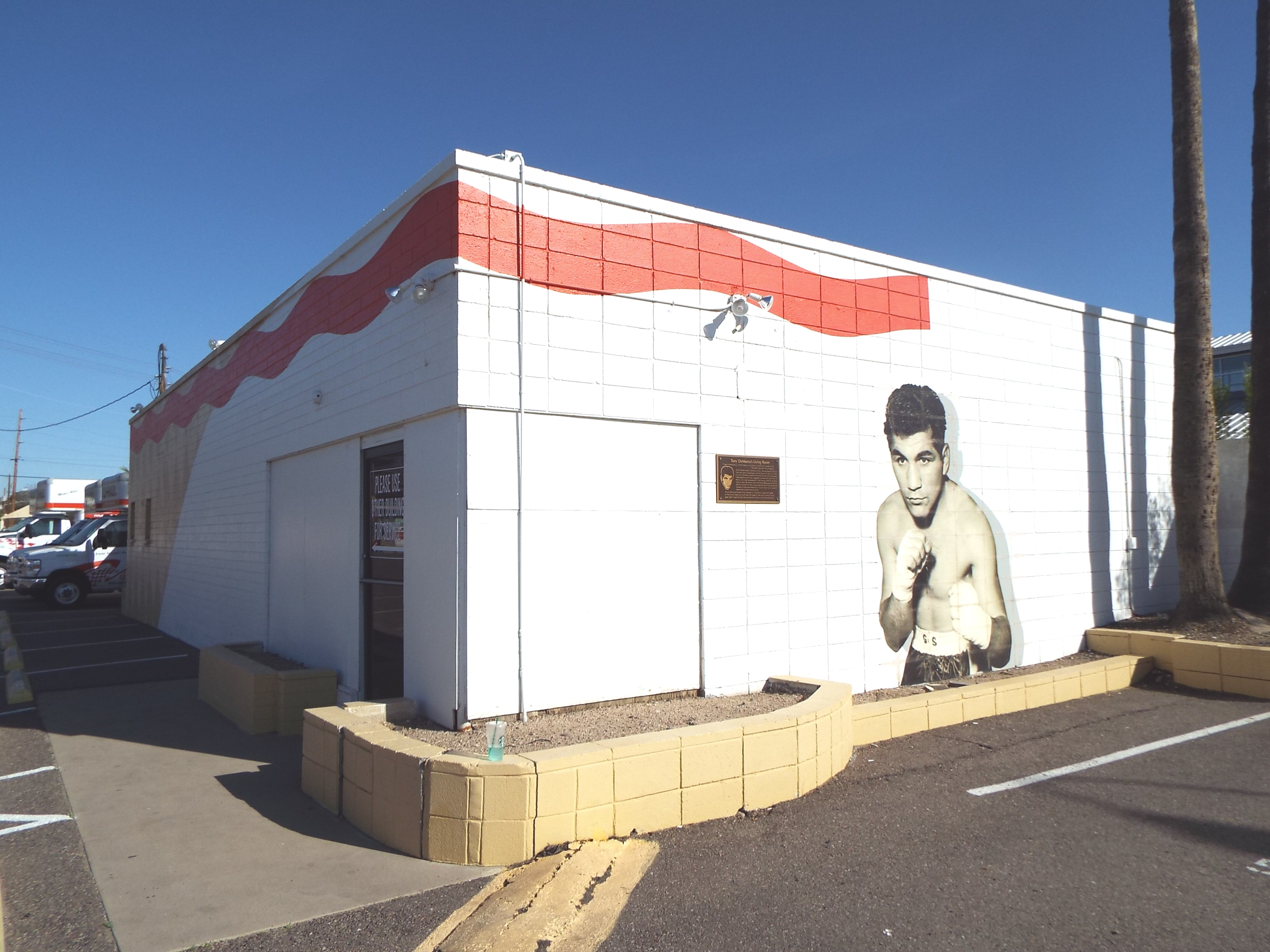
Tony DeMarco's Living Room Lounge was located in this building at 4007 E. Camelback Road in Phoenix, Arizona. When he died, DeMarco no longer owned the property which now belongs to the U-Haul Co.

DeMarco's legacy is an undying part of Boston's history. Training under Boston greats such as Frankie Waters, DeMarco was able to sell out the Boston Garden, breaking attendance records. Mayor Thomas Menino even honored DeMarco with a street, named after him, in Boston's famous North End. The street, which is perpendicular to Atlantic Avenue, is named "Tony DeMarco Way".

DeMarco received many honors, including an induction in the Official National Italian American Hall of Fame in Chicago. Looking back on his career, DeMarco remarked "Mainly I consider myself a slugger." DeMarco once fought on the undercard to Rocky Marciano. Boxing, Boston and Tony DeMarco In his last bout, DeMarco won a ten-round decision over Stefan Redl in Boston on February 6, 1962.

A statue of DeMarco unveiled on October 20, 2012, at the corners of Hanover and Cross Streets in Boston's historic North End was designed by sculptor Harry Weber, and a full-length documentary by filmmaker Marino Amoruso based on DeMarco's autobiography Nardo: Memoirs of a Boxing Champion is in the works. DeMarco was also featured in "The Flame and Fury of Fleet Street," a segment of the documentary, Boston's North End: An Italian American Story.

DeMarco was inducted into the International Boxing Hall of Fame as a member of the class of 2019.

== Professional boxing record ==
71 fights	58 wins	12 losses
By knockout	33	7
By decision	25	5
Draws	1	

No.	Result	Record	Opponent	Type	Round	Date	Location	Notes
71	Win	58–12–1	Stefan Redl	UD	10	Feb 6, 1962	Boston Garden, Boston, Massachusetts, U.S.	
70	Win	57–12–1	Don Jordan	KO	2 (10)	Dec 19, 1961	Boston Garden, Boston, Massachusetts, U.S.	
69	Loss	56–12–1	Denny Moyer	TKO	2 (10)	Feb 10, 1960	Boston Garden, Boston, Massachusetts, U.S.	
68	Win	56–11–1	Edward G. Connors	UD	10	Apr 20, 1959	Boston Garden, Boston, Massachusetts, U.S.	
67	Win	55–11–1	George Monroe	TKO	8 (10)	Mar 11, 1959	Boston Garden, Boston, Massachusetts, U.S.	
66	Loss	54–11–1	Virgil Akins	TKO	12 (15)	Jan 21, 1958	Boston Garden, Boston, Massachusetts, U.S.	For Massachusetts world welterweight title
65	Loss	54–10–1	Virgil Akins	KO	14 (15)	Oct 29, 1957	Boston Garden, Boston, Massachusetts, U.S.	For vacant Massachusetts world welterweight title
64	Win	54–9–1	Walter Byars	MD	10	May 25, 1957	Boston Garden, Boston, Massachusetts, U.S.	
63	Win	53–9–1	Larry Boardman	UD	10	Mar 30, 1957	Boston Garden, Boston, Massachusetts, U.S.	
62	Win	52–9–1	Gaspar Ortega	UD	10	Feb 9, 1957	Boston Garden, Boston, Massachusetts, U.S.	
61	Loss	51–9–1	Gaspar Ortega	SD	10	Dec 21, 1956	Madison Square Garden, New York City, New York, U.S.	
60	Loss	51–8–1	Gaspar Ortega	SD	10	Nov 23, 1956	Madison Square Garden, New York City, New York, U.S.	
59	Win	51–7–1	Kid Gavilán	UD	10	Oct 13, 1956	Boston Garden, Boston, Massachusetts, U.S.	
58	Win	50–7–1	Vince Martinez	UD	10	Jun 16, 1956	Fenway Park, Boston, Massachusetts, U.S.	
57	Win	49–7–1	Arthur Persley	UD	10	Apr 28, 1956	Boston Garden, Boston, Massachusetts, U.S.	
56	Win	48–7–1	Wallace Bud Smith	TKO	9 (10)	Mar 5, 1956	Boston Garden, Boston, Massachusetts, U.S.	
55	Loss	47–7–1	Carmen Basilio	TKO	12 (15)	Nov 30, 1955	Boston Garden, Boston, Massachusetts, U.S.	For NYSAC, NBA, and The Ring welterweight titles
54	Win	47–6–1	Chico Vejar	TKO	1 (10)	Sep 14, 1955	Boston Garden, Boston, Massachusetts, U.S.	
53	Loss	46–6–1	Carmen Basilio	TKO	12 (15)	Jun 10, 1955	War Memorial Auditorium, Syracuse, New York, U.S.	Lost NYSAC, NBA, and The Ring welterweight titles
52	Win	46–5–1	Johnny Saxton	TKO	14 (15)	Apr 1, 1955	Boston Garden, Boston, Massachusetts, U.S.	Won NYSAC, NBA, and The Ring welterweight titles
51	Draw	45–5–1	Jimmy Carter	PTS	10	Feb 11, 1955	Boston Garden, Boston, Massachusetts, U.S.	
50	Win	45–5	Pat Manzi	TKO	1 (10)	Nov 6, 1954	Arena, Boston, Massachusetts, U.S.	
49	Win	44–5	Chris Christensen	TKO	6 (10)	Sep 25, 1954	Arena, Boston, Massachusetts, U.S.	
48	Win	43–5	George Araujo	TKO	5 (10)	Jul 12, 1954	Fenway Park, Boston, Massachusetts, U.S.	
47	Win	42–5	Johnny Cesario	UD	10	May 22, 1954	Arena, Boston, Massachusetts, U.S.	
46	Win	41–5	Carlos Chavez	UD	10	Apr 24, 1954	Boston Garden, Boston, Massachusetts, U.S.	
45	Win	40–5	Wilbur Wilson	KO	2 (10)	Mar 15, 1954	Boston Garden, Boston, Massachusetts, U.S.	
44	Win	39–5	Wilbur Wilson	UD	10	Jan 18, 1954	Boston Garden, Boston, Massachusetts, U.S.	
43	Win	38–5	Teddy Davis	UD	10	Dec 12, 1953	Boston Garden, Boston, Massachusetts, U.S.	
42	Win	37–5	Paddy DeMarco	SD	10	Oct 10, 1953	Mechanics Building, Boston, Massachusetts, U.S.	
41	Win	36–5	Chick Boucher	TKO	6 (10)	Sep 19, 1953	Boston Garden, Boston, Massachusetts, U.S.	
40	Win	35–5	Bertie Conn	TKO	1 (10)	Sep 10, 1953	Boston Garden, Boston, Massachusetts, U.S.	
39	Win	34–5	Terry Young	TKO	5 (10)	Aug 3, 1953	Mechanics Building, Boston, Massachusetts, U.S.	
38	Win	33–5	Pat Demers	TKO	6 (10)	Jul 18, 1953	Mechanics Building, Boston, Massachusetts, U.S.	
37	Win	32–5	Jimmy Redding	KO	2 (8)	Jun 25, 1953	Boston Garden, Boston, Massachusetts, U.S.	
36	Win	31–5	Ken Parsley	KO	6 (8)	Jun 13, 1953	Mechanics Building, Boston, Massachusetts, U.S.	
35	Loss	30–5	Gene Poirier	PTS	8	May 15, 1952	Forum, Montreal, Quebec, Canada	
34	Loss	30–4	Brian Kelly	UD	8	May 1, 1952	Forum, Montreal, Quebec, Canada	
33	Win	30–3	Puggy Brown	KO	5 (6)	Mar 6, 1952	Laurel Garden, Newark, New Jersey, U.S.	
32	Win	29–3	Jackie O'Brien	SD	8	Mar 1, 1952	Ridgewood Grove, Brooklyn, New York City, New York, U.S.	
31	Win	28–3	Abdoul Ali	KO	2 (4)	Feb 26, 1952	Laurel Garden, Newark, New Jersey, U.S.	
30	Win	27–3	Freeman King	SD	8	Feb 18, 1952	Rhode Island Auditorium, Providence, Rhode Island, U.S.	
29	Win	26–3	Julio Colon	KO	3 (6)	Jan 26, 1952	Ridgewood Grove, Brooklyn, New York City, New York, U.S.	
28	Win	25–3	Llewellyn Richardson	PTS	6	Jan 15, 1952	Westchester County Center, White Plains, New York, U.S.	
27	Win	24–3	Manny Santos	TKO	2 (6)	Dec 17, 1951	Arena, Trenton, New Jersey, U.S.	
26	Win	23–3	Joe Torrens	PTS	4	Dec 7, 1951	Madison Square Garden, New York City, New York, U.S.	
25	Win	22–3	Stanley Hilliard	KO	4 (6)	Nov 27, 1951	Laurel Garden, Newark, New Jersey, U.S.	
24	Win	21–3	Freeman King	SD	6	Oct 1, 1951	Mechanics Building, Boston, Massachusetts, U.S.	
23	Loss	20–3	Chick Boucher	TKO	4 (4)	Mar 12, 1951	Boston Garden, Boston, Massachusetts, U.S.	
22	Win	20–2	Reggie Martina	KO	1 (4)	Feb 19, 1951	Mechanics Building, Boston, Massachusetts, U.S.	
21	Win	19–2	Larry Griffin	UD	8	Jan 18, 1951	Exposition Building, Portland, Oregon, U.S.	
20	Win	18–2	Ken Murray	KO	2 (8)	Jan 11, 1951	Exposition Building, Portland, Oregon, U.S.	
19	Win	17–2	Ken Murray	UD	6	Dec 11, 1950	Mechanics Building, Boston, Massachusetts, U.S.	
18	Win	16–2	Joe Wright	UD	6	Oct 30, 1950	Arena, Boston, Massachusetts, U.S.	
17	Win	15–2	Des Shanley	UD	4	Oct 9, 1950	Valley Arena, Holyoke, Massachusetts, U.S.	
16	Win	14–2	Bobby Weaver	TKO	3 (4)	Sep 25, 1950	Valley Arena, Holyoke, Massachusetts, U.S.	
15	Win	13–2	Ricky Ferreira	PTS	6	Sep 19, 1950	Page Arena, New Bedford, Massachusetts, U.S.	
14	Win	12–2	Roger Ringuette	TKO	1 (4)	Jul 10, 1950	Braves Field, Boston, Massachusetts, U.S.	
13	Win	11–2	Bobby Veal	KO	2 (6)	Feb 20, 1950	Mechanics Building, Boston, Massachusetts, U.S.	
12	Loss	10–2	Art Suffoletta	RTD	5 (6)	Jan 9, 1950	New Haven, Connecticut, U.S.	
11	Win	10–1	Frankie Steele	TKO	3 (4)	Dec 19, 1949	Mechanics Building, Boston, Massachusetts, U.S.	
10	Win	9–1	Frankie Steele	SD	4	Nov 14, 1949	Boston Garden, Boston, Massachusetts, U.S.	
9	Win	8–1	Vic Young	TKO	1 (6)	Oct 21, 1949	Mechanics Building, Boston, Massachusetts, U.S.	
8	Loss	7–1	Jay White	PTS	6	Oct 7, 1949	Providence, Rhode Island, U.S.	
7	Win	7–0	Roger Lessard	KO	5 (6)	Sep 12, 1949	Mechanics Building, Boston, Massachusetts, U.S.	
6	Win	6–0	Ray Dulmaine	RTD	1 (6)	Feb 17, 1949	Mechanics Building, Boston, Massachusetts, U.S.	
5	Win	5–0	Joe Palaza	TKO	2 (6)	Jan 14, 1949	Mechanics Building, Boston, Massachusetts, U.S.	
4	Win	4–0	George Silva	PTS	6	Dec 14, 1948	North Street Arena, Salem, Massachusetts, U.S.	
3	Win	3–0	Billy Shea	TKO	3 (4)	Dec 10, 1948	Boston Garden, Boston, Massachusetts, U.S.	
2	Win	2–0	Meteor Jones	KO	2 (4)	Nov 16, 1948	Salem Arena, Salem, Massachusetts, U.S.	
1	Win	1–0	Meteor Jones	KO	1 (6)	Oct 21, 1948	Boston Garden, Boston, Massachusetts, U.S.	

== Titles in boxing ==
=== Major world titles ===
- NYSAC welterweight champion (147 lbs)
- NBA (WBA) welterweight champion (147 lbs)

=== The Ring magazine titles ===
- The Ring welterweight champion (147 lbs)

=== Undisputed titles ===
- Undisputed welterweight champion

== See also ==
- List of welterweight boxing champions

Sporting positions
World boxing titles
Preceded by Johnny Saxton	NYSAC welterweight champion April 1, 1955 – June 10, 1955	Succeeded by Carmen Basilio
Preceded by Johnny Saxton	NBA welterweight champion April 1, 1955 – June 10, 1955	Succeeded by Carmen Basilio
Preceded by Johnny Saxton	The Ring welterweight champion April 1, 1955 – June 10, 1955	Succeeded by Carmen Basilio
Preceded by Johnny Saxton	Undisputed welterweight champion April 1, 1955 – June 10, 1955	Succeeded by Carmen Basilio
