= Nick Stato =

American boxer (1922–2019)

Nicholas Sotiropoulos (January 24, 1922 - May 28, 2019) was a featherweight professional boxer from Massachusetts, United States.

== Personal life ==
Stato was a resident of Springfield, Massachusetts.

== Professional career ==
Stato began his professional career on September 5, 1944, with a knockout victory over veteran Eddie Reardon. In his fifth professional fight Stato fought against future great Buddy Hayes, who he knocked out in the first round. By the time Stato lost his first fight, against journeyman Georgie Knox in August 1945, Stato had run his record to 22-0. Between March and September 1945, Stato had 17 consecutive fights in Hartford, Connecticut, winning 16 of them.

Though Stato was never a champion, he had an impressive career and fought many prominent small men of his era, including Hayes, Dennis Pat Brady, Harry Jeffra and Redtop Davis. At his retirement, Stato could boast a final record of 47 wins (15 by knockout), 14 losses and 7 draws.
