= Miguel Acevedo =

Cuban boxer

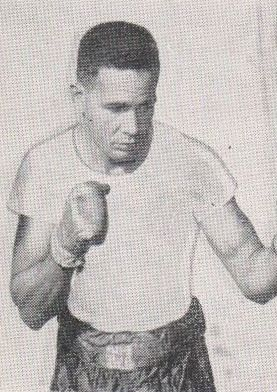
Miguel Acevedo - 22 November 1950 St. Paul Auditorium Boxing Program (cropped)

Miguel Acevedo was a featherweight professional boxer from Cuba.

== Personal life ==
Acevedo was a native of Cuba.

== Professional career ==
Acevedo's professional career began in March 1940 and ended in June 1951. Acevedo's official record at his retirement was 50 wins (19 by knockout) and 20 losses, although it is not known how many unsanctioned fights may have been excluded from his official record. Along the way Acevedo fought a number of notable opponents, including Jackie Graves, Sandy Saddler, Corky Gonzales, Glen Flanagan, Charley Riley, Willie Pep, Phil Terranova, Kid Gavilán, Redtop Davis, and others with equally stellar records. Charley Riley recalled later that he had never been hit harder than he was by Acevedo.
