= Paul Jorgensen =

American boxer

Paul Jorgensen (April 5, 1935 – August 6, 2008) was a super featherweight professional boxer from Louisiana.

== Personal life ==
Jorgenson was born in Tallulah, Louisiana, and made his residence in Port Arthur, Texas.

== Professional career ==
Jorgensen made his professional debut on April 27, 1954, with a four-round points win against Baby Galvez in Houston, Texas. He won his first sixteen fights, including a win against Eddie Bertolino on June 1, 1954. It was in the rematch against Bertolino on September 28, 1954, that Jorgensen suffered his first loss. Like many boxers of his day, he fought frequently - often twice a month. Jorgensen continued to fight and generally to win, facing tough competition like Redtop Davis, Lulu Perez, Jackie Blair, Carmelo Costa, Victor Manuel Quijano, Harold Gomes, and Battling Torres. He retired after a losing to Battling Torres on September 6, 1960 and managed to cram an amazing number of fights (93) in a relatively short career (7 1/2 years). His final record was 81 wins (35 by knockout), 8 losses, and 4 draws. Jorgensen died August 6, 2008, in Port Arthur, Texas.
