= Federico Plummer =

Panamanian boxer

Federico Plummer (April 10, 1929 – April 4, 2004) was a former lightweight professional boxer from Panama.

== Personal life ==
Plummer was a native of Panama and a resident of Miami, Florida. He was born April 10, 1929, and died April 4, 2004.

== Professional career ==
Federico Plummer made his professional debut, a sixth-round knockout of Sam Langford on May 23, 1947. Plummer won his first six fights before losing to Mike Ross in April 1948. His first 30 bouts took place in his native Panama; he took a record of 26–2–1 (1 no contest) into his first foreign fight, a loss to Redtop Davis on December 10, 1951. Plummer never fought as frequently as some Latin boxers, and toward the end of his career he fought even less, including just three fights in 1956, and 1958, and just once in 1957 and 1959. Plummer's final match was a decision win against Kid Centella in Managua on September 8, 1959. He retired with a record of 42 wins (21 by knockout) and 10 losses, with 2 draws.

== Notes ==
final match was a decision lost to Tony Huerta. MSG (ret) US Army Federico Plummer II
