= Larry Boardman =

American boxer

Larry Boardman (born March 21, 1936, in Marlborough, Connecticut) is an American former lightweight boxer, rated the second best lightweight in the world in 1956.

== Biography ==
Board, who is Jewish, was managed by his father (Sam Boardman). He lived in Connecticut for the majority of his life.

=== Career ===
On February 7, 1956, at the age of 19, Boardman defeated lightweight champion Wallace "Bud" Smith at the Boston Garden, leading to him being rated # 10 in the world in the lightweight division by Ring. It was Boardman's 31st victory in his first 32 pro fights. On April 14, 1956, he beat featherweight champion and later Hall of Famer Sandy Saddler in a unanimous decision in 10 rounds, and moved up to # 7.

Boardman also defeated two other lightweight world champions, Paddy DeMarco and Jimmy Carter. At the end of 1956, he was ranked as the # 2 lightweight contender in the world.

Boardman had a 45–10–1 record in his career, winning 23 of his fights by knockout. In 2008, he was inducted into the Connecticut Boxing Hall of Fame.
