= Harold Gomes =

American boxer

Personal information
- Born: August 22, 1933 (age 93) Providence, Rhode Island, United States
- Height: 5 ft 5 in (165 cm)
- Weight: Super featherweight Featherweight

Boxing career
- Stance: Orthodox

Boxing record
- Total fights: 60
- Wins: 50
- Win by KO: 24
- Losses: 10
- Draws: 0

Harold Gomes (born August 22, 1933) is an American former professional boxer who competed between 1951 and 1963. The highlight of Gomes's career came in 1959 when he won the world super featherweight title against Paul Jorgensen.

== Professional career ==
Gomes fought as a professional for the first time in September 1951 at the age of 18. His debut was against Billy St Pierre at the Rhode Island Auditorium in his hometown, the venue for his first thirteen professional fights. Billy St Pierre was knocked out in the second round, giving Gomes his first professional victory. Gomes remained undefeated until January 1954, when he lost a ten-round decision to Tommy Tibbs, a man whom Gomes had beaten twice in 1952 and once in 1953. In March 1954 Gomes claimed the first title of his career when he beat Johnny O'Brien, via a twelve-round unanimous decision, for the USA New England featherweight title at the Boston Garden. Gomes suffered two knockout defeats in the second half of 1954, both to Tibbs in Boston. Following his second knockout loss to Tibbs, Gomes won twelve fights in a row, including a rematch against O'Brien for the New England title. His run of victories was ended in August 1957 when he lost a unanimous ten-round decision to Isidro Martinez at the Boston Arena.

After eight successive victories following his loss to Martinez, Gomes fought for the vacant world super featherweight title against Jorgensen, a man he had defeated earlier in the year, in July 1959. The fight lasted the fifteen round distance, with Gomes knocked down four times and Jorgensen repeatedly cautioned for low blows. The scorecards of the judges were all in favour of Gomes, thus making him the new world champion. Following his world title victory, Gomes was named The Ring's Fighter of the Month.

Gomes's world title reign was ended in his first defense, when he lost to the Filipino challenger Flash Elorde in March 1960. Gomes, who was the betting favourite, was fighting outside the United States for the first time, as the contest was held at the Araneta Coliseum (now SMART Araneta Coliseum) in Quezon City. The sellout crowd of 26,000 watched Elorde knock Gomes down five times en route to a seventh-round knockout victory. A rematch took place in August at the Civic Auditorium in San Francisco. Elorde claimed the victory after one minute and twenty seconds of the opening round. Elorde scored a knockdown with a left hand to the face, and although Gomes was able to rise to his feet at the count of seven, he was knocked out with a combination soon after.

Gomes did not participate in a world title fight again in his career, which contained eight further fights. After four successive wins, he lost a split decision to Johnny Bizzarro before being knocked out in his final three professional fights, including his final fight, a one-round knockout defeat to Dave Coventry in October 1963, in London.

== Championships and accomplishments ==
- Cauliflower Alley Club
  - Boxing Honoree (1994)

Achievements
Vacant Title last held by Sandy Saddler	World Super Featherweight Champion; July 20, 1959 – March 16, 1960	Succeeded by Gabriel Elorde
Super featherweight status
Preceded by Sandy Saddler	Oldest living world champion September 18, 2001 – present	Incumbent
Status (all weights)
Preceded by Robert Cohen; Bantam	Oldest living world champion March 2, 2022 – present	Incumbent
