= Pat Mallane =

American boxer

Patrick Mallane, alias Irish, was a lightweight professional boxer from Connecticut.

== Personal life ==
Pat Mallane was a native of Union City, Connecticut. He died in 2007 at the age of 74.

== Professional career ==
Mallane made his professional debut on January 27, 1951, with a fourth round knockout of Pearl Robinson. After winning his first two bouts Mallane suffered a draw against Lem Harvey. The draw against Harvey remained the only blemish on Mallane's record through ten fights, when he lost by knockout to Willie Stevenson on August 16 of 1951. Mallane didn't lose again in his next thirteen fights, though he did have three more draws to think about. When Mallane fought for the New England Lightweight Title against Redtop Davis on June 30, 1954, he was sporting a record of 29–4–4. Mallane lost to Davis, then went on a slide, compiling a less than stellar record of 3-7-4 before retiring after a knockout loss to Bobby Bartels on March 17, 1960. At his retirement Mallane had a career record of 32 wins (27 by knockout), 12 losses, and 8 draws.
