= Séraphin Ferrer =

French boxer

Personal information
- Nationality: French
- Born: 5 August 1931; Tlemcen, Algeria
- Died: 21 February 2001 (aged 69)

Sport
- Sport: Boxing

Séraphin Ferrer (5 August 1931 – 21 February 2001) was a French boxer. He competed in the men's lightweight event at the 1952 Summer Olympics.
