= Sandy Saddler =

American boxer (1926–2001)

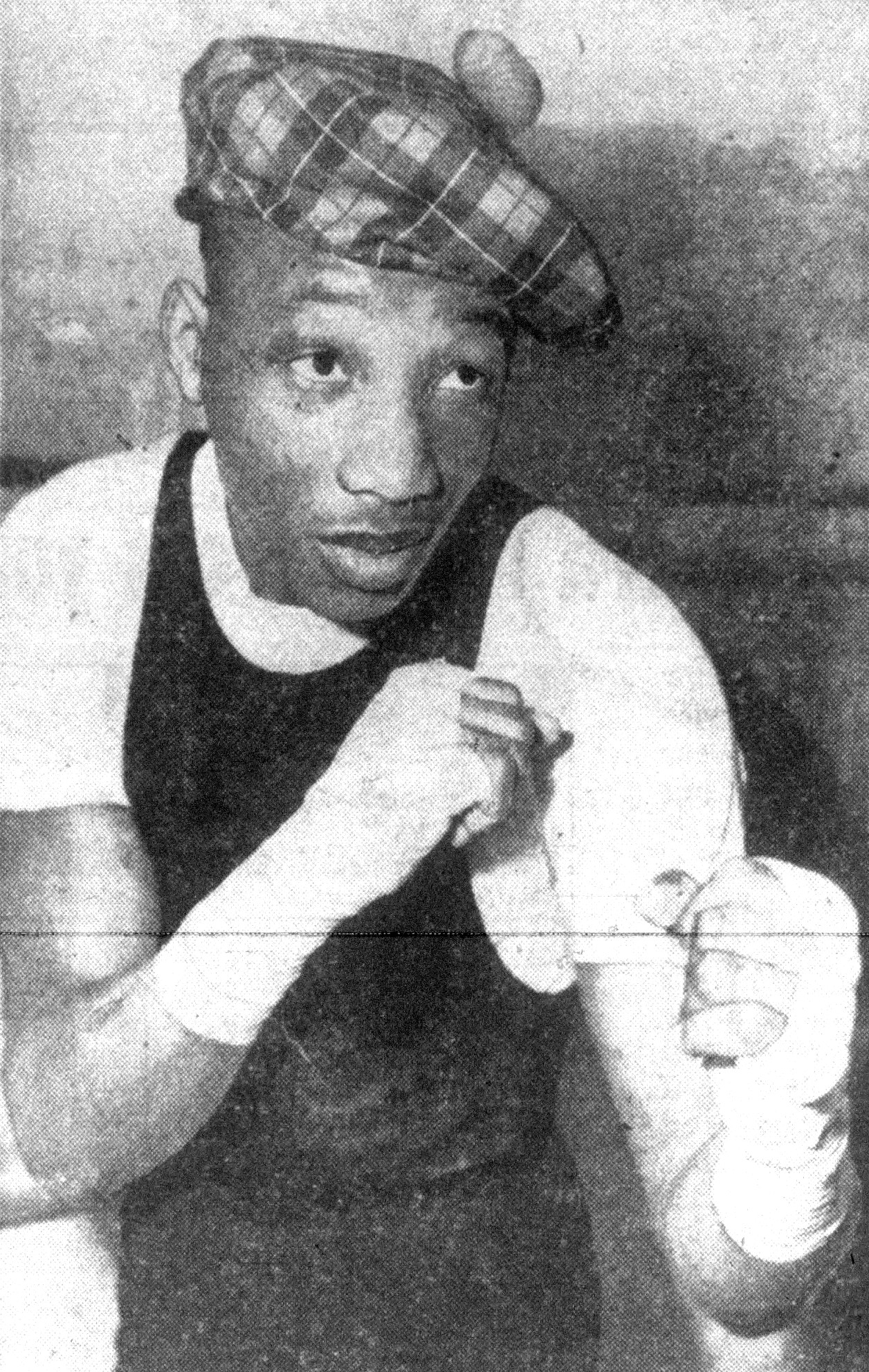
- Saddler, circa 1951

Personal information
- Born: Joseph "Joey" Saddler; June 23, 1926 Boston, Massachusetts, U.S.
- Died: September 18, 2001 (aged 75)
- Height: 5 ft 8 1/2 in (174 cm)
- Weight: Featherweight; Super featherweight

Boxing career
- Reach: 70 in (178 cm)
- Stance: Orthodox

Boxing record
- Total fights: 162
- Wins: 145
- Win by KO: 104
- Losses: 16
- Draws: 2

Joseph "Sandy" Saddler (June 23, 1926 – September 18, 2001) was an American professional boxer. He was a two-time featherweight world champion, having also held the super featherweight title. Over his twelve-year career (1944–56), Saddler scored 104 knockouts and was stopped only once himself, in his second professional fight, by Jock Leslie. Considered to be one of the hardest hitting featherweights, Saddler was ranked number five on The Ring magazine's list of "100 Greatest Punchers of All Time". His nephew is Grandmaster Flash.

== Professional career ==
Saddler is best known for his four-bout series with Willie Pep. However, he had 93 fights prior to facing Pep.

=== Early career ===
Saddler turned Pro at Bantamweight winning his pro-debut & losing his second fight, he fought 10 more times at Bantamweight & had a record of 85-6-2 prior to facing Willie Pep, Saddler record included a loss to Phil Terranova & a Draw with Jimmy Carter

=== Facing Willie Pep ===
The two first faced off on October 29, 1948. Pep was the reigning featherweight champion of the world, and coming into the fight boasted a record of 134-1-1 (43 KO). Saddler was the underdog & captured the title by knocking Pep down four times en route to a four-round knockout victory. This was only the second time that Pep was beaten, Sammy Angott beat him in 1943, and first time he was ever stopped in 137 bouts.

Pep then recaptured the crown on February 11, 1949, by outpointing Saddler over 15 rounds. Saddler regained the crown on September 8, 1950, by a TKO in the eighth round. Pep quit after dislocating his shoulder. The pair fought their last fight on September 26, 1951. In one of the dirtiest championship fights ever fought, Saddler won when the fight was stopped in the tenth round.

Saddler fought several other notable opponents during his career. He knocked out future lightweight champion Joe Brown, as well as lightweight champions Lauro Salas and Paddy DeMarco. Saddler beat lightweight champion Jimmy Carter, knocked out future junior lightweight champion Gabriel "Flash" Elorde, and lost to Larry Boardman.

== Professional boxing record ==
163 fights	145 wins	16 losses
By knockout	104	1
By decision	41	14
By disqualification	0	1
Draws	2	

No.	Result	Record	Opponent	Type	Round, time	Date	Location	Notes
163	Loss	145–16–2	Larry Boardman	UD	10	Apr 14, 1956	Boston Garden, Boston, Massachusetts, US	
162	Win	145–15–2	George Monroe	TKO	3 (10), 1:59	Feb 13, 1956	Rhode Island Auditorium, Providence, Rhode Island, US	
161	Win	144–15–2	Gabriel 'Flash' Elorde	TKO	13 (15), 0:59	Jan 18, 1956	Cow Palace, Daly City, California, US	Retained NYSAC, NBA, and The Ring featherweight titles
160	Win	143–15–2	Dave Gallardo	TKO	6 (10)	Dec 12, 1955	Civic Auditorium, San Francisco, California, US	
159	Loss	142–15–2	Gabriel 'Flash' Elorde	UD	10	Jul 20, 1955	Rizal Memorial Sports Complex, Manila, Philippines	
158	Win	142–14–2	Kaneko Shigeji	TKO	6 (10)	Jul 8, 1955	Korakuen Baseball Stadium, Japan	
157	Loss	141–14–2	Joey Lopes	UD	10	May 24, 1955	Memorial Auditorium, Sacramento, California, US	
156	Win	141–13–2	Kenny Davis	TKO	5 (10), 2:57	Apr 5, 1955	Civic Center, Butte, Montana, US	
155	Win	140–13–2	Teddy Davis	UD	15	Feb 25, 1955	Madison Square Garden, New York City, New York, US	Retained NYSAC, NBA, and The Ring featherweight titles
154	Win	139–13–2	Lulu Perez	KO	4 (10), 1:34	Jan 17, 1955	Boston Garden, Boston, Massachusetts, US	
153	Win	138–13–2	Bobby Woods	UD	10	Dec 10, 1954	Coliseum, Spokane, Washington, US	
152	Win	137–13–2	Ray Famechon	RTD	5 (10)	Oct 25, 1954	Palais des Sports, Paris, France	
151	Win	136–13–2	Baby Neff Ortiz	KO	3 (10), 1:04	Sep 27, 1954	Nuevo Circo, Caracas, Venezuela	
150	Win	135–13–2	Jackie Blair	KO	1 (10)	Aug 30, 1954	Caracas, Venezuela	
149	Win	134–13–2	Libby Manzo	TKO	10 (10)	Jul 5, 1954	St. Nicholas Arena, New York City, New York, US	
148	Loss	133–13–2	Hoacine Khalfi	SD	10	May 17, 1954	St. Nicholas Arena, New York City, New York, US	
147	Win	133–12–2	Augie Salazar	TKO	7 (10), 1:12	Apr 1, 1954	Arena, Boston, Massachusetts, US	Bout stopped because of several cuts suffered by Salazar
146	Win	132–12–2	Charlie Slaughter	TKO	4 (10), 1:20	Mar 4, 1954	Armory, Akron, Ohio, US	Slaughter threw up his hands and walked back to his corner ending the fight
145	Win	131–12–2	Bill Bossio	TKO	9 (10), 2:35	Apr 15, 1954	St. Nicholas Arena, New York City, New York, US	
144	Win	130–12–2	Tommy Collins	TKO	5 (10), 2:20	Mar 17, 1952	Boston Garden, Boston, Massachusetts, US	
143	Loss	129–12–2	Armand Savoie	DQ	3 (10)	Mar 3, 1952	Forum, Montreal, Quebec, Canada	
142	Loss	129–11–2	George Araujo	UD	10	Jan 14, 1952	Boston Garden, Boston, Massachusetts, US	
141	Loss	129–10–2	Paddy DeMarco	SD	10	Dec 7, 1951	Madison Square Garden, New York City, New York, US	
140	Win	129–9–2	Willie Pep	RTD	9 (15)	Sep 26, 1951	Polo Grounds, New York City, New York, US	Retained NYSAC, NBA, and The Ring featherweight titles
139	Loss	128–9–2	Paddy DeMarco	SD	10	Aug 27, 1951	Arena, Milwaukee, Wisconsin, US	
138	Win	128–8–2	Hermie Freeman	TKO	5 (10), 0:47	Aug 20, 1951	Toppi Stadium, Philadelphia, Pennsylvania, US	
137	Win	127–8–2	Angel Olivieri	KO	5 (10), 0:30	Jun 30, 1951	Estadio Luna Park, Buenos Aires, Argentina	
136	Win	126–8–2	Mario Salinas	KO	5 (10)	Jun 22, 1951	Teatro Circo Caupolicán, Santiago de Chile, Chile	
135	Win	125–8–2	Oscar Flores	KO	1 (12)	Jun 16, 1951	Estadio Luna Park, Buenos Aires, Argentina	
134	Win	124–8–2	Alfredo Prada	KO	4 (12)	Jun 2, 1951	Estadio Luna Park, Buenos Aires, Argentina	
133	Win	123–8–2	Harry LaSane	UD	10	May 5, 1951	Arena, Hershey, Pennsylvania, US	
132	Win	122–8–2	Freddie Herman	RTD	5 (10)	Apr 3, 1951	Olympic Auditorium, Los Angeles, California, US	
131	Win	121–8–2	Lauro Salas	TKO	6 (10), 1:50	Mar 27, 1951	Olympic Auditorium, Los Angeles, California, US	Cuts
130	Win	120–8–2	Diego Sosa	KO	2 (10)	Feb 28, 1951	Palacio de Deportes, Havana, Cuba	Retained NBA junior lightweight title
129	Win	119–8–2	Jesse Underwood	UD	10	Jan 23, 1951	Memorial Auditorium, Buffalo, New York, US	
128	Loss	118–8–2	Del Flanagan	UD	10	Dec 6, 1950	Olympia Stadium, Detroit, Michigan, US	
127	Win	118–7–2	Charley Riley	MD	10	Nov 1, 1950	Arena, Saint Louis, Missouri, US	
126	Win	117–7–2	Harry LaSane	UD	10	Oct 12, 1950	Kiel Auditorium, Saint Louis, Missouri, US	
125	Win	116–7–2	Willie Pep	RTD	8 (15)	Sep 8, 1950	Yankee Stadium, New York City, New York, US	Won NYSAC, NBA, and The Ring featherweight titles
124	Win	115–7–2	Leroy Willis	RTD	2 (10)	Jun 30, 1950	Long Beach Stadium, Long Beach, California, US	
123	Win	114–7–2	Johnny Forte	KO	3 (10), 1:03	Jun 19, 1950	Oakwood Stadium, Toronto, Canada	
122	Win	113–7–2	Miguel Acevedo	TKO	6 (10)	May 25, 1950	Auditorium, Minneapolis, Minnesota, US	
121	Win	112–7–2	Jesse Underwood	PTS	10	Apr 29, 1950	Mara's Arena, Waterbury, Connecticut, US	
120	Win	111–7–2	Lauro Salas	TKO	9 (15), 2:15	Apr 18, 1950	Arena, Cleveland, Ohio, US	Retained NBA junior lightweight title
119	Win	110–7–2	Reuben Davis	TKO	7 (10)	Apr 10, 1950	Laurel Garden, Newark, New Jersey, US	
118	Win	109–7–2	Luis Ramos	TKO	3 (10), 2:40	Feb 20, 1950	Mutual Street Arena, Toronto, Ontario, Canada	
117	Win	108–7–2	Chuck Burton	KO	1 (10), 1:12	Feb 6, 1950	Valley Arena, Holyoke, Massachusetts, US	
116	Win	107–7–2	Pedro Firpo	KO	1 (10)	Jan 22, 1950	Caracas, Venezuela	
115	Win	106–7–2	Paulie Jackson	KO	1 (10)	Jan 16, 1950	Caracas, Venezuela	
114	Win	105–7–2	Orlando Zulueta	SD	10	Dec 6, 1949	Cleveland, Ohio, US	Won vacant NBA junior lightweight title
113	Win	104–7–2	Leroy Willis	UD	10	Nov 7, 1949	Sports Arena, Toledo, Ohio, US	
112	Win	103–7–2	Paddy DeMarco	RTD	9 (10)	Oct 28, 1949	Madison Square Garden, New York City, New York, US	
111	Win	102–7–2	Proctor Heinhold	TKO	2 (10), 2:02	Sep 26, 1949	McNearney Stadium, Schenectady, New York, US	
110	Win	101–7–2	Harold Dade	PTS	10	Sep 2, 1949	Chicago Stadium, Chicago, Illinois, US	
109	Win	100–7–2	Alfredo Escobar	TKO	9 (10), 0:12	Aug 23, 1949	Olympic Auditorium, Los Angeles, California, US	
108	Win	99–7–2	Johnny Rowe	TKO	8 (10), 2:53	Aug 8, 1949	Coney Island Velodrome, New York City, New York, US	
107	Win	98–7–2	Chuck Burton	TKO	5 (10), 1:34	Aug 2, 1949	Wahconah Park, Pittsfield, Massachusetts, US	
106	Win	97–7–2	Gordon House	TKO	4 (10)	Jul 15, 1949	Long Beach Stadium, New York City, New York, US	
105	Win	96–7–2	Luis Ramos	KO	5 (10), 1:54	Jun 23, 1949	Queensboro Arena, New York City, New York, US	
104	Win	95–7–2	Jim Keery	KO	4 (10)	Jun 2, 1949	White City Stadium, London, England, UK	
103	Win	94–7–2	Ermanno Bonetti	KO	2 (10), 1:43	Apr 18, 1949	Arena, Philadelphia, Pennsylvania, US	
102	Win	93–7–2	Felix Ramirez	PTS	10	Mar 21, 1949	Laurel Garden, Newark, New Jersey, US	
101	Loss	92–7–2	Willie Pep	UD	15	Feb 11, 1949	Madison Square Garden, New York City, New York, US	Lost NYSAC, NBA, and The Ring featherweight titles
100	Win	92–6–2	Young Finnigan	KO	5 (10), 2:52	Jan 16, 1949	Estadio Olimpico, Panama City, Panama	
99	Win	91–6–2	Terry Young	TKO	10 (10), 0:37	Dec 17, 1948	Madison Square Garden, New York City, New York, US	
98	Win	90–6–2	Eddie Giosa	KO	2 (10), 1:34	Dec 7, 1948	Arena, Cleveland, Ohio, US	
97	Win	89–6–2	Dennis Pat Brady	UD	10	Nov 29, 1948	Boston Garden, Boston, Massachusetts, US	
96	Win	88–6–2	Tomas Beato	TKO	2 (10), 2:22	Nov 19, 1948	State Armory, Bridgeport, Connecticut, US	
95	Win	87–6–2	Willie Pep	KO	4 (15), 2:38	Oct 29, 1948	Madison Square Garden, New York City, New York, US	Won NYSAC, NBA, and The Ring featherweight titles
94	Win	86–6–2	Willie Roache	TKO	3 (10), 1:29	Oct 11, 1948	Arena, New Haven, Connecticut, US	
93	Win	85–6–2	Aquilino Allen	KO	2 (10), 1:29	Aug 22, 1948	Arena de Colon, Colon City, Panama	
92	Win	84–6–2	Kid Zefine	KO	2 (10), 1:05	Aug 15, 1948	Arena de Colon, Colon City, Panama	
91	Loss	83–6–2	Chico Rosa	SD	10	Jun 29, 1948	Honolulu Stadium, Honolulu, Hawaii	
90	Win	83–5–2	Harry LaSane	UD	10	May 24, 1948	Auditorium, Hartford, Connecticut, US	
89	Win	82–5–2	Allan Tanner	KO	5 (10)	Apr 24, 1948	Swingsters Square Garden, San Nicolas, Aruba	
88	Win	81–5–2	Jose Alberto Diaz	TKO	7 (10)	Apr 17, 1948	Caracas, Venezuela	
87	Win	80–5–2	Luis Monagas	KO	3 (10)	Apr 10, 1948	Caracas, Venezuela	
86	Win	79–5–2	Bobby Timpson	PTS	10	Mar 23, 1948	Auditorium, Hartford, Connecticut, US	
85	Win	78–5–2	Thompson Harmon	TKO	8 (10), 2:02	Mar 8, 1948	Valley Arena, Holyoke, Massachusetts, US	
84	Win	77–5–2	Archie Wilmer	PTS	8	Mar 5, 1948	Madison Square Garden, New York City, New York, US	
83	Win	76–5–2	Joey Angelo	UD	10	Feb 9, 1948	St. Nicholas Arena, New York City, New York, US	
82	Win	75–5–2	Charley Noel	PTS	10	Feb 2, 1948	Valley Arena, Holyoke, Massachusetts, US	
81	Win	74–5–2	Orlando Zulueta	PTS	10	Dec 13, 1947	Palacio de Deportes, Havana, Cuba	
80	Win	73–5–2	Lino Garcia	KO	3 (10)	Dec 5, 1947	Palacio de Deportes, Havana, Cuba	
79	Win	72–5–2	Kid Barquerito	KO	5 (10)	Nov 9, 1947	Caracas, Venezuela	
78	Win	71–5–2	Lino Garcia	KO	2 (?)	Oct 26, 1947	Caracas, Venezuela	
77	Win	70–5–2	Al Pennino	TKO	4 (10), 1:06	Oct 13, 1947	St. Nicholas Arena, New York City, New York, US	
76	Loss	69–5–2	Humberto Sierra	SD	10	Oct 3, 1947	Auditorium, Minneapolis, Minnesota, US	
75	Win	69–4–2	Angelo Ambrosano	KO	2 (8), 2:55	Sep 17, 1947	Jamaica Arena, New York City, New York, US	
74	Win	68–4–2	Miguel Acevedo	TKO	7 (8), 3:00	Aug 29, 1947	Madison Square Garden, New York City, New York, US	
73	Win	67–4–2	Leslie Harris	TKO	5 (10)	Aug 14, 1947	Bader Field, Atlantic City, New Jersey, US	
72	Win	66–4–2	Oscar Calles	KO	5 (10), 0:30	Jul 26, 1947	Caracas, Venezuela	
71	Draw	65–4–2	Jimmy Carter	MD	10	Jun 3, 1947	Griffith Stadium, Washington, DC, US	
70	Win	65–4–1	Melvin Bartholomew	UD	10	May 9, 1947	Coliseum Arena, New Orleans, Louisiana, US	
69	Win	64–4–1	Joe Brown	RTD	2 (10)	May 2, 1947	Coliseum Arena, New Orleans, Louisiana, US	
68	Win	63–4–1	Charley 'Cabey' Lewis	UD	10	Apr 14, 1947	St. Nicholas Arena, New York City, New York, US	
67	Win	62–4–1	Carlos Malacara	PTS	10	Mar 29, 1947	El Toreo de Cuatro Caminos, Mexico City, Mexico	
66	Win	61–4–1	Leonardo Lopez	KO	2 (10)	Mar 8, 1947	Arena Coliseo, Mexico City, Mexico	
65	Win	60–4–1	Larry Thomas	TKO	2 (6), 2:59	Feb 7, 1947	Armory, Asbury Park, New Jersey, US	
64	Win	59–4–1	Humberto Zavala	TKO	7 (10), 1:57	Jan 27, 1947	St. Nicholas Arena, New York City, New York, US	
63	Win	58–4–1	George 'Dusty' Brown	KO	4 (10), 2:33	Jan 20, 1947	Valley Arena, Holyoke, Massachusetts, US	
62	Win	57–4–1	Leonard Caesar	KO	2 (6)	Dec 30, 1946	Laurel Garden, Newark, New Jersey, US	
61	Win	56–4–1	Luis Marquez	TKO	2 (6)	Dec 26, 1946	Jamaica Arena, New York City, New York, US	
60	Win	55–4–1	Clyde English	KO	3 (6)	Dec 9, 1946	Valley Arena, Holyoke, Massachusetts, US	
59	Win	54–4–1	Artie Price	UD	10	Nov 12, 1946	Arena Gardens, Detroit, Michigan, US	
58	Win	53–4–1	Joe Rodriguez	KO	3 (8)	Oct 10, 1946	Hamid's Pier, Atlantic City, New Jersey, US	
57	Win	52–4–1	Pedro Firpo	PTS	10	Aug 22, 1946	Ebbets Field, New York City, New York, US	
56	Win	51–4–1	Dom Amoroso	KO	2 (10), 1:59	Aug 5, 1946	Rhode Island Auditorium, Providence, Rhode Island, US	
55	Loss	50–4–1	Phil Terranova	UD	10	Jul 23, 1946	University of Detroit Stadium, Detroit, Michigan, US	
54	Win	50–3–1	Georgie Cooper	TKO	7 (10)	Jul 10, 1946	Ebbets Field, New York City, New York, US	
53	Win	49–3–1	Cedric Flournoy	TKO	5 (8)	Jun 13, 1946	University of Detroit Stadium, Detroit, Michigan, US	
52	Win	48–3–1	Pedro Firpo	PTS	8	Apr 25, 1946	Hamid's Pier, Atlantic City, New Jersey, US	
51	Win	47–3–1	Johnny Wolgast	PTS	8	Apr 11, 1946	Hamid's Pier, Atlantic City, New Jersey, US	
50	Win	46–3–1	Ralph LaSalle	KO	1 (6)	Apr 8, 1946	St. Nicholas Arena, New York City, New York, US	
49	Loss	45–3–1	Bobby McQuillar	UD	10	Feb 18, 1946	Arena Gardens, Detroit, Michigan, US	
48	Win	45–2–1	Arbrie Bowie	KO	1 (6)	Jan 17, 1946	Armory, Orange, New Jersey, US	
47	Win	44–2–1	Filiberto Osario	PTS	6	Dec 21, 1945	Madison Square Garden, New York City, New York, US	
46	Win	43–2–1	Joey Monteiro	UD	8	Dec 14, 1945	Arena, Boston, Massachusetts, US	
45	Win	42–2–1	Benny Daniels	SD	6	Dec 3, 1945	Valley Arena, Holyoke, Massachusetts, US	
44	Win	41–2–1	Richie Miyashiro	PTS	6	Sep 21, 1945	Madison Square Garden, New York City, New York, US	
43	Win	40–2–1	Earl Mintz	KO	1 (8)	Aug 27, 1945	Rhode Island Auditorium, Providence, Rhode Island, US	
42	Win	39–2–1	Bobby English	KO	3 (8), 0:30	Aug 20, 1945	Rhode Island Auditorium, Providence, Rhode Island, US	
41	Win	38–2–1	Lou Langley	KO	1 (6)	Aug 16, 1945	Fort Hamilton Arena, New York City, New York, US	
40	Win	37–2–1	Luis Rivera	TKO	4 (6), 2:27	Jul 30, 1945	Queensboro Arena, New York City, New York, US	
39	Win	36–2–1	Joey Monteiro	TKO	5 (6)	Jul 24, 1945	MacArthur Stadium, New York City, New York, US	
38	Win	35–2–1	Herbie Jones	TKO	3 (6)	Jul 23, 1945	Coliseum, Baltimore, Maryland, US	
37	Win	34–2–1	Leo Methot	KO	1 (6)	Jun 29, 1945	Madison Square Garden, New York City, New York, US	
36	Win	33–2–1	Bobby Washington	TKO	2 (6)	Jun 25, 1945	Fair Grounds Arena, Allentown, Pennsylvania, US	
35	Win	32–2–1	Caswell Harris	TKO	2 (6), 3:00	Jun 18, 1945	Coliseum, Baltimore, Maryland, US	
34	Win	31–2–1	Chilindrina Valencia	TKO	9 (10)	Apr 30, 1945	Arcadia Gardens, Detroit, Michigan, US	
33	Win	30–2–1	Willie Anderson	TKO	4 (8), 3:00	Apr 20, 1945	Olympia Stadium, Detroit, Michigan, US	
32	Win	29–2–1	Jimmy Allen	KO	1 (6)	Apr 2, 1945	Laurel Garden, Newark, New Jersey, US	
31	Win	28–2–1	Georgie Knox	TKO	4 (8), 2:48	Mar 22, 1945	Convention Hall, Camden, New Jersey, US	
30	Win	27–2–1	Joey Monteiro	KO	4 (6)	Mar 19, 1945	St. Nicholas Arena, New York City, New York, US	
29	Win	26–2–1	Harold Gibson	PTS	6	Mar 10, 1945	Ridgewood Grove, New York City, New York, US	
28	Win	25–2–1	Johnny Booker	TKO	2 (4)	Mar 8, 1945	Masonic Hall, Highland Park, New Jersey, US	
27	Win	24–2–1	Joey Gatto	TKO	1 (6)	Feb 19, 1945	Madison Square Garden, New York City, New York, US	
26	Win	23–2–1	Benny May	PTS	6	Jan 26, 1945	Masonic Hall, Highland Park, New Jersey, US	
25	Win	22–2–1	Joey Puig	KO	1 (6)	Jan 22, 1945	St. Nicholas Arena, New York City, New York, US	
24	Win	21–2–1	Lucky Johnson	KO	1 (6)	Jan 15, 1945	Laurel Garden, Newark, New Jersey, US	
23	Win	20–2–1	Tony Oshiro	PTS	6	Jan 13, 1945	Ridgewood Grove, New York City, New York, US	
22	Win	19–2–1	Midget Mayo	KO	3 (6)	Dec 26, 1944	Laurel Garden, Newark, New Jersey, US	
21	Win	18–2–1	Earl Mintz	KO	2 (6)	Dec 16, 1944	Ridgewood Grove, New York City, New York, US	
20	Win	17–2–1	Tony Oshiro	TKO	5 (6), 1:42	Dec 12, 1944	Jersey City Gardens, Jersey City, New Jersey, US	
19	Win	16–2–1	Percy Cabey Lewis	KO	1 (6)	Nov 28, 1944	Jersey City Gardens, Jersey City, New Jersey, US	
18	Win	15–2–1	Manuel Torres	TKO	5 (6), 2:06	Nov 24, 1944	St. Nicholas Arena, New York City, New York, US	
17	Win	14–2–1	Ken Tompkins	KO	1 (6)	Nov 13, 1944	Laurel Garden, Newark, New Jersey, US	
16	Win	13–2–1	Manuel Torres	PTS	6	Nov 11, 1944	Ridgewood Grove, New York City, New York, US	
15	Win	12–2–1	Cliff Smith	PTS	6	Aug 18, 1944	Madison Square Garden, New York City, New York, US	
14	Win	11–2–1	Georgie Knox	TKO	3 (6)	Aug 8, 1944	MacArthur Stadium, New York City, New York, US	
13	Win	10–2–1	Al Pennino	PTS	6	Jul 25, 1944	MacArthur Stadium, New York City, New York, US	
12	Win	9–2–1	Benny Saladino	TKO	3 (6)	Jul 18, 1944	MacArthur Stadium, New York City, New York, US	
11	Win	8–2–1	Clyde English	PTS	6	Jul 11, 1944	Dexter Park Arena, New York City, New York, US	
10	Draw	7–2–1	Lou Alter	PTS	4	Jun 23, 1944	Madison Square Garden, New York City, New York, US	
9	Loss	7–2	Lou Alter	PTS	6	Jun 15, 1944	Fort Hamilton Arena, New York City, New York, US	
8	Win	7–1	Jose Aponte Torres	PTS	6	Jun 13, 1944	Roosevelt Stadium, Union City, New Jersey, US	
7	Win	6–1	Domingo Diaz	PTS	6	May 23, 1944	Grotto Auditorium, Jersey City, New Jersey, US	
6	Win	5–1	Jose Aponte Torres	PTS	6	May 15, 1944	Valley Arena, Holyoke, Massachusetts, US	
5	Win	4–1	Jose Aponte Torres	PTS	6	May 8, 1944	Arena, Trenton, New Jersey, US	
4	Win	3–1	Joe Landry	KO	1 (6), 2:12	Apr 17, 1944	Valley Arena, Holyoke, Massachusetts, US	
3	Win	2–1	Al King	KO	2 (6)	Mar 27, 1944	Valley Arena, Holyoke, Massachusetts, US	
2	Loss	1–1	Jock Leslie	TKO	3 (6), 2:40	Mar 21, 1944	Auditorium, Hartford, Connecticut, US	
1	Win	1–0	Earl Roys	PTS	8	Mar 7, 1944	Auditorium, Hartford, Connecticut, US	

== Titles in boxing ==
=== Major world titles ===
- NYSAC featherweight champion (126 lbs) (2×)
- NBA (WBA) featherweight champion (126 lbs) (2×)
- NBA (WBA) super featherweight champion (130 lbs)

=== The Ring magazine titles ===
- The Ring featherweight champion (126 lbs) (2×)

=== Undisputed titles ===
- Undisputed featherweight champion (2×)

== After boxing ==
Saddler retired from boxing in 1956, aged 30, after an eye injury sustained in a traffic accident. He later became a trainer and helped train the young George Foreman in the 1970s, including Foreman's first reign as world heavyweight champion. In 2003, he was ranked #5 on the Ring Magazine's list of 100 greatest punchers of all time.

In 1990, Saddler was inducted into the prestigious International Boxing Hall of Fame. He is the uncle of Joseph Saddler, better known as Grandmaster Flash. Saddler died on September 18, 2001.

== See also ==
- List of featherweight boxing champions
- List of super featherweight boxing champions

Achievements
Preceded by Willie Pep	World Featherweight Champion; October 29, 1948 – February 11, 1949	Succeeded by Willie Pep
Preceded by Willie Pep	World Featherweight Champion; September 8, 1950 – January 21, 1957; Retired	Vacant Title next held by Hogan Bassey
Vacant Title last held by Frankie Klick	World Super Featherweight Champion; December 6, 1949– July 20, 1959; Vacant	Vacant Title next held by Harold Gomes
