= Charley Riley =

American boxer

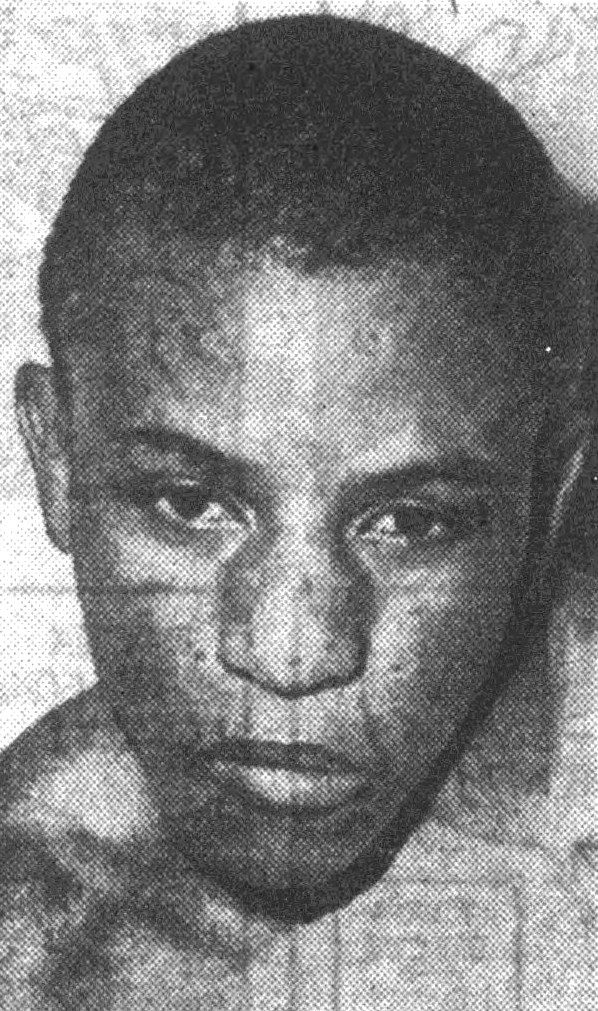
Riley, circa 1951

Charley Riley (April 22, 1922 - May 22, 1994) is an inductee of the Boxing Hall of Fame. He was born in St. Louis, Missouri and was sometimes known as Chillin' Charley.

== Career ==
Charley Riley was a top featherweight boxing contender in the 1940s and 1950s. He achieved nationwide recognition in the United States with a trio of exciting fights with ex-NBA featherweight champ Phil Terranova. He lost via a one-punch body-shot knockout on February 22, 1946, but on April 30, 1947, evened the score with a 7th-round TKO of Terranova. On September 3, 1947, he scored a first-round TKO of Terranova. Reports were that the referee stopped this fight on the advice of the ring doctor because Terranova was bleeding profusely.

Riley fought Willie Pep for the featherweight championship in St Louis January 16, 1950 and was knocked out by Pep by a body punch in the fifth round. He accepted a non-title bout with reigning featherweight champion Sandy Saddler November 1, 1950 and lost a decision. He put pressure on Saddler in the first part of the fight but faded in the later rounds. During his career Riley also faced Glen Flanagan, Jackie Graves, Corky Gonzalez, George Araujo and Redtop Davis.

Riley retired in 1954 with a record of 69 wins (39 by knockout), 29 losses, and 2 draws. Although he was never a world champion, Charley Riley was inducted to The Ring magazine's Boxing Hall of Fame (disbanded in 1987).

He was also known as the "Finney Avenue Fashion Plate" (an avenue in St. Louis) for his attention to dress.
