= Harry LaSane =

American boxer

Harry LaSane (30 September 1924 – 1 August 1984) was a featherweight professional boxer from Texas.

== Personal life ==
LaSane lived in Houston, Texas.

== Professional career ==
LaSane made his professional debut on March 27, 1946, with a 6-round draw against Darnell Carter. Two weeks later LaSane set things right by outpointing Carter in six rounds. LaSane was not a big puncher, and depended on speed and defense for his success, which he sustained well through 1950 - by the end of 1950 his record was a very impressive 57-16-3. After that date, however, LaSane only managed a dismal record of 0-17-1 - one draw in his last 18 fights. At the time of his retirement in April 1954, LaSane had a final record of 57 wins (only 7 by knockout) and 33 losses with 4 draws.
