= Arthur King (boxer) =

Canadian boxer

Personal information
- Nickname: Little Arthur (alias)
- Born: Arthur Augustus King; 23 February 1927 Toronto, Canada
- Died: 14 December 2011 (aged 84)
- Height: 5 ft 7 1/2 in (1.71 m)
- Weight: feather/light/welter/middleweight

Boxing career
- Reach: 69 in (175 cm)
- Stance: Orthodox

Boxing record
- Total fights: 76
- Wins: 63 (KO 20)
- Losses: 13 (KO 2)

"Little" Arthur King (February 23, 1927 — December 14, 2011) was a Canadian professional feather/light/welter/middleweight boxer of the 1940s and 1950s who won the Canadian lightweight title, and British Empire lightweight title. His professional fighting weight varied from 126 lb (57 kg; 9 st 0 lb), i.e. featherweight to 151 1/2 lb (68.7 kg; 10 st 11.5 lb), i.e. middleweight. He was managed by Dave Yack (pre-1948), and Frank "Blinky" Palermo (1948-52), and struggled with his health for many years.
