= Gaspar Ortega =

Mexican boxer (1935–2021)

Gaspar "Indio" Ortega
Personal information
- Nickname: El Indio
- Born: Gaspar Ortega; October 31, 1935 Mexicali, Baja California, Mexico
- Died: December 16, 2021 (aged 86) East Haven, Connecticut, U.S.
- Height: 1.80 m (5 ft 11 in)
- Weight: Light middleweight Welterweight

Boxing career
- Reach: 1.87 m (6 ft 1 1/2 in)
- Stance: Orthodox

Boxing record
- Total fights: 176
- Wins: 131
- Win by KO: 69
- Losses: 39
- Draws: 6

Gaspar "Indio" Ortega (October 31, 1935 – December 16, 2021) was a Mexican professional boxer and was considered one of the best Welterweight boxers from Mexico.

== Pro career ==
In January 1953, Ortega was only seventeen years old when he won his pro debut against Miguel Ocana in San Luis Río Colorado, Sonora, Mexico.

On June 3, 1961 Gaspar lost to Emile Griffith, the bout would be his first shot at a World Championship.

One of his opponents, American boxer Billy Bello, was found dead of an apparent drug overdose on July 20, 1963, only two weeks after losing a split decision to Ortega at a televised fight held at the Madison Square Garden in New York; Bello was 19. Their bout had taken place on July 6,

== Retirement and death ==
In 1995 Ortega was elected into the New Jersey Boxing Hall of Fame.

Ortega died in East Haven, Connecticut on December 16, 2021, at the age of 86.

== Professional boxing record ==
| 176 fights | 131 wins | 39 losses |
|---|---|---|
| By knockout | 69 | 2 |
| By decision | 62 | 37 |
| Draws | 6 | |

| No. | Result | Record | Opponent | Type | Round, time | Date | Location | Notes |
|---|---|---|---|---|---|---|---|---|
| 176 | Loss | 131–39–6 | Charley Shipes | PTS | 10 | Sep 25, 1965 | Uptown Arena, Modesto, California, US | |
| 175 | Loss | 131–38–6 | Henry Aldrich | UD | 10 | Aug 17, 1965 | Civic Auditorium, San Jose, California, US | |
| 174 | Loss | 131–37–6 | Manuel Avitia | PTS | 10 | Jul 31, 1965 | Nuevo Laredo, Mexico | |
| 173 | Loss | 131–36–6 | Ted Whitfield | UD | 10 | May 25, 1965 | Boston Garden, Boston, Massachusetts, US | |
| 172 | Loss | 131–35–6 | Manuel Gonzalez | PTS | 10 | Mar 23, 1965 | Sam Houston Coliseum, Houston, Texas, US | |
| 171 | Loss | 131–34–6 | Brian Curvis | PTS | 10 | Feb 23, 1965 | Royal Albert Hall, Kensington, London, England, UK | |
| 170 | Draw | 131–33–6 | Marshall Wells | PTS | 10 | Jan 20, 1965 | Corpus Christi, Texas, US | |
| 169 | Loss | 131–33–5 | Sandro Mazzinghi | TKO | 7 (10) | Nov 6, 1964 | PalaEur, Roma, Italy | |
| 168 | Loss | 131–32–5 | Gabe Terronez | UD | 10 | Sep 29, 1964 | Kearney Bowl, Fresno, California, US | |
| 167 | Loss | 131–31–5 | Stan Harrington | UD | 12 | Sep 8, 1964 | Civic Auditorium, Honolulu, Hawaii, US | For U.S. and vacant North American junior middleweight titles |
| 166 | Draw | 131–30–5 | Gene Bryant | SD | 10 | Aug 4, 1964 | Auditorium, Portland, Oregon, US | |
| 165 | Win | 131–30–4 | Cecil Mott | UD | 10 | Jun 27, 1964 | Laurel High School Gym, Laurel, Texas, US | |
| 164 | Win | 130–30–4 | Kilio Barringo | KO | 1 (10) | Jun 20, 1964 | San Luis Rio Colorado, Mexico | |
| 163 | Win | 129–30–4 | Joe Armorosa | KO | 2 (10) | Jun 15, 1964 | Sonora, Mexico | |
| 162 | Win | 128–30–4 | Mike Tunney | UD | 10 | Jun 13, 1964 | Medford, Oregon, US | |
| 161 | Win | 127–30–4 | Nando Artega | PTS | 10 | Jun 6, 1964 | Magdalena, Mexico | |
| 160 | Win | 126–30–4 | Juan Rodriguez | PTS | 10 | May 30, 1964 | San Luis Rio Colorado, Mexico | |
| 159 | Win | 125–30–4 | Felipe Mendoza | PTS | 10 | May 25, 1964 | Cananea, Mexico | |
| 158 | Win | 124–30–4 | Kid Rojas | KO | 4 (10) | May 23, 1964 | Sonora, Mexico | |
| 157 | Win | 123–30–4 | Willie Ross | TKO | 5 (10), 0:48 | May 19, 1964 | Castaways Hotel, Las Vegas, Nevada, US | |
| 156 | Win | 122–30–4 | Juan Rodriguez | KO | 3 (10) | May 16, 1964 | Sonora, Mexico | |
| 155 | Win | 121–30–4 | Felipe Mendoza | KO | 5 (10) | May 14, 1964 | Sonora, Mexico | |
| 154 | Win | 120–30–4 | Kid Ayala | KO | 4 (10) | May 13, 1964 | Cananea, Mexico | |
| 153 | Win | 119–30–4 | Francisco Cancio | PTS | 10 | May 11, 1964 | Nogales, Mexico | |
| 152 | Win | 118–30–4 | Sixto Diaz | KO | 4 (10) | May 8, 1964 | Sonora, Mexico | |
| 151 | Win | 117–30–4 | Joe Arias | KO | 2 (10) | May 6, 1964 | San Luis Rio Colorado, Mexico | |
| 150 | Win | 116–30–4 | Carlos Arias | KO | 2 (10) | May 4, 1964 | Tijuana, Mexico | |
| 149 | Win | 115–30–4 | Victor Delgado | KO | 2 (10) | Apr 29, 1964 | Magdalena, Mexico | |
| 148 | Win | 114–30–4 | Manuel Garcia | KO | 2 (10) | Apr 26, 1964 | Sonora, Mexico | |
| 147 | Win | 113–30–4 | Carlos Diego | KO | 3 (10) | Apr 24, 1964 | Sonora, Mexico | |
| 146 | Win | 112–30–4 | Joe Louis Hargrove | TKO | 4 (10), 1:49 | Apr 22, 1964 | Madison Square Garden, Phoenix, Arizona, US | |
| 145 | Loss | 111–30–4 | Stan Harrington | UD | 10 | Mar 17, 1964 | Civic Auditorium, Honolulu, Hawaii, US | |
| 144 | Win | 111–29–4 | Domenico Tiberia | PTS | 10 | Feb 28, 1964 | Palazzetto dello Sport, Roma, Italy | |
| 143 | Loss | 110–29–4 | Francois Pavilla | PTS | 10 | Feb 10, 1964 | Palais des Sports, Paris, France | |
| 142 | Win | 110–28–4 | Memo Lopez | PTS | 10 | Jan 22, 1964 | Memorial Civic Auditorium, Stockton, California, US | |
| 141 | Win | 109–28–4 | Luis Garduno | UD | 10 | Jan 13, 1964 | Sports Center, Tucson, Arizona, US | |
| 140 | Win | 108–28–4 | Kid Rayo | UD | 10 | Dec 11, 1963 | Madison Square Garden, Phoenix, Arizona, US | |
| 139 | Win | 107–28–4 | Aristeo Chavarin | UD | 10 | Dec 4, 1963 | Ciudad Juarez, Mexico | |
| 138 | Loss | 106–28–4 | Nino Benvenuti | PTS | 10 | Oct 18, 1963 | PalaEur, Roma, Italy | |
| 137 | Win | 106–27–4 | Ricardo Ray | PTS | 10 | Sep 25, 1963 | Sonora, Mexico | |
| 136 | Win | 105–27–4 | Bobby Pencer | PTS | 10 | Sep 23, 1963 | San Luis Rio Colorado, Mexico | |
| 135 | Win | 104–27–4 | Willie Garcia | KO | 2 (10) | Sep 17, 1963 | Puebla, Mexico | |
| 134 | Win | 103–27–4 | Freddie Mora | KO | 6 (10) | Sep 15, 1963 | San Luis Rio Colorado, Mexico | |
| 133 | Draw | 102–27–4 | Tony Noriega | PTS | 10 | Sep 13, 1963 | Bakersfield Dome, Bakersfield, California, US | |
| 132 | Win | 102–27–3 | Manny Ochoa | PTS | 10 | Aug 18, 1963 | Sonora, Mexico | |
| 131 | Win | 101–27–3 | Kildo Rodriguez | KO | 5 (10) | Aug 12, 1963 | Mexico | |
| 130 | Win | 100–27–3 | Jimmy Durpey | PTS | 10 | Aug 4, 1963 | Sonora, Mexico | |
| 129 | Win | 99–27–3 | Al Mendez | KO | 1 (10) | Jul 28, 1963 | Nogales, Mexico | |
| 128 | Win | 98–27–3 | Alberto Perez | KO | 5 (10) | Jul 20, 1963 | Ensenada, Mexico | |
| 127 | Win | 97–27–3 | Billy Bello | SD | 10 | Jul 6, 1963 | Madison Square Garden, New York City, New York, US | |
| 126 | Win | 96–27–3 | Al Villa | KO | 2 (10) | Jun 9, 1963 | Sonora, Mexico | |
| 125 | Win | 95–27–3 | Mike Diaz | KO | 4 (10) | Jun 4, 1963 | Sonora, Mexico | |
| 124 | Win | 94–27–3 | Danny Brown | KO | 3 (10) | Jun 2, 1963 | Clovis, New Mexico, US | |
| 123 | Win | 93–27–3 | Everardo Armenta | KO | 4 (10) | May 17, 1963 | Monterrey, Mexico | |
| 122 | Win | 92–27–3 | Jose Diaz | KO | 3 (10) | Apr 20, 1963 | Nogales, Mexico | |
| 121 | Draw | 91–27–3 | Alvaro Gutierrez | PTS | 10 | Mar 9, 1963 | Monterrey, Mexico | |
| 120 | Win | 91–27–2 | Beto Gerardo | KO | 7 (10) | Feb 26, 1963 | Auditorio Municipal, Ciudad Juarez, Mexico | |
| 119 | Win | 90–27–2 | Pedro Torres | KO | 2 (10) | Feb 10, 1963 | Cananea, Mexico | |
| 118 | Win | 89–27–2 | Charley Scott | UD | 10 | Jan 28, 1963 | Civic Center, Baltimore, Maryland, US | |
| 117 | Win | 88–27–2 | Tony Noriega | PTS | 10 | Dec 3, 1962 | Bakersfield Dome, Bakersfield, California, US | |
| 116 | Win | 87–27–2 | Mel Barker | MD | 10 | Nov 15, 1962 | Tingley Coliseum, Albuquerque, New Mexico, US | |
| 115 | Win | 86–27–2 | Stan Harrington | RTD | 7 (10) | Oct 23, 1962 | Honolulu Stadium, Honolulu, Hawaii, US | |
| 114 | Loss | 85–27–2 | Bob Fosmire | UD | 10 | Sep 22, 1962 | Arena, Boston, Massachusetts, US | |
| 113 | Win | 85–26–2 | Charley 'Tombstone' Smith | KO | 5 (10), 1:18 | Sep 10, 1962 | Civic Center, Butte, Montana, US | |
| 112 | Win | 84–26–2 | Juan Lopez | KO | 5 (10) | Aug 5, 1962 | Piedras Negras, Mexico | |
| 111 | Win | 83–26–2 | Charley 'Tombstone' Smith | PTS | 10 | Jul 24, 1962 | Plaza de Toros, Ciudad Juarez, Mexico | |
| 110 | Win | 82–26–2 | Tony Reyes | KO | 2 (10) | Jul 22, 1962 | Sonora, Mexico | |
| 109 | Win | 81–26–2 | Al Duarte | KO | 3 (10) | Jul 21, 1962 | Sonora, Mexico | |
| 108 | Loss | 80–26–2 | Charley 'Tombstone' Smith | SD | 10 | Jul 2, 1962 | Civic Center, Butte, Montana, US | |
| 107 | Win | 80–25–2 | Camilo Flores | KO | 6 (10) | Jun 24, 1962 | Agua Prieta, Mexico | |
| 106 | Win | 79–25–2 | Teddy Arnold | KO | 6 (10) | Jun 23, 1962 | Cananea, Mexico | |
| 105 | Win | 78–25–2 | Everardo Armenta | PTS | 10 | Jun 12, 1962 | Plaza de Toros, Ciudad Juarez, Mexico | |
| 104 | Win | 77–25–2 | Carey Mace | KO | 5 (10) | Jun 4, 1962 | Sonora, Mexico | |
| 103 | Win | 76–25–2 | Mike Corona | KO | 3 (10) | Jun 2, 1962 | Sonora, Mexico | |
| 102 | Win | 75–25–2 | Federico Payan | KO | 2 (10) | May 29, 1962 | Plaza de Toros, Ciudad Juarez, Mexico | |
| 101 | Win | 74–25–2 | Arnie Cota Robles | PTS | 10 | May 19, 1962 | Marshall Gym, Clovis, New Mexico, US | |
| 100 | Win | 73–25–2 | Trinidad Veloz | TKO | 4 (10), 1:52 | May 15, 1962 | Sports Arena, Amarillo, Texas, US | |
| 99 | Win | 72–25–2 | Jimmy Davis | UD | 10 | May 5, 1962 | Sonora, Mexico | |
| 98 | Win | 71–25–2 | Bernardo Velez | KO | 6 (10) | Apr 30, 1962 | Sonora, Mexico | |
| 97 | Loss | 70–25–2 | Joey Limas | UD | 10 | Apr 23, 1962 | Civic Auditorium, Albuquerque, New Mexico, US | |
| 96 | Loss | 70–24–2 | Charley Scott | UD | 10 | Jan 6, 1962 | Madison Square Garden, New York City, New York, US | |
| 95 | Win | 70–23–2 | Charlie Wright | TKO | 3 (10) | Dec 22, 1961 | Yavapai County Youth Center, Prescott, Arizona, US | |
| 94 | Win | 69–23–2 | Bobby Brown | KO | 4 (10) | Dec 13, 1961 | Madison Square Garden, Phoenix, Arizona, US | |
| 93 | Win | 68–23–2 | Negro Veloz | KO | 2 (10) | Dec 5, 1961 | Sports Arena, Yuma, Arizona, US | |
| 92 | Loss | 67–23–2 | Frankie Ramirez | UD | 10 | Nov 28, 1961 | Civic Auditorium, San Jose, California, US | |
| 91 | Win | 67–22–2 | Kid Rayo | MD | 10 | Oct 24, 1961 | San Jose, California, US | |
| 90 | Win | 66–22–2 | Tony Coleman | KO | 3 (10) | Oct 16, 1961 | Tucson Garden, Tucson, Arizona, US | |
| 89 | Win | 65–22–2 | Kid Rayo | UD | 10 | Sep 29, 1961 | Municipal Auditorium, San Antonio, Texas, US | |
| 88 | Win | 64–22–2 | Negro Veloz | KO | 4 (10) | Sep 20, 1961 | Madison Square Garden, Phoenix, Arizona, US | |
| 87 | Win | 63–22–2 | Georgie Hart | KO | 4 (10) | Sep 13, 1961 | Guaymas, Mexico | |
| 86 | Win | 62–22–2 | Federico Payan | KO | 2 (10) | Sep 10, 1961 | Nogales, Mexico | |
| 85 | Win | 61–22–2 | Negro Veloz | KO | 5 (10) | Sep 7, 1961 | Hermosillo, Mexico | |
| 84 | Win | 60–22–2 | Reybon Stubbs | KO | 3 (10) | Sep 2, 1961 | Ciudad Obregon, Mexico | |
| 83 | Win | 59–22–2 | Bobby Brown | KO | 5 (10) | Aug 22, 1961 | Nogales, Mexico | |
| 82 | Loss | 58–22–2 | Emile Griffith | TKO | 12 (15), 0:48 | Jun 3, 1961 | Olympic Auditorium, Los Angeles, California, US | For NYSAC, NBA, and The Ring welterweight titles |
| 81 | Win | 58–21–2 | Benny 'Kid' Paret | UD | 10 | Feb 25, 1961 | Olympic Auditorium, Los Angeles, California, US | |
| 80 | Loss | 57–21–2 | Carmen Basilio | UD | 10 | Jan 7, 1961 | Madison Square Garden, New York City, New York, US | |
| 79 | Loss | 57–20–2 | Kid Rayo | PTS | 10 | Nov 28, 1960 | Municipal Auditorium, Long Beach, California, US | |
| 78 | Loss | 57–19–2 | Luis Federico Thompson | UD | 10 | Oct 29, 1960 | Madison Square Garden, New York City, New York, US | |
| 77 | Win | 57–18–2 | Kid Rayo | UD | 10 | Oct 11, 1960 | Memorial Auditorium, Fresno, California, US | |
| 76 | Win | 56–18–2 | Karl Heinz Guder | RTD | 6 (10) | Sep 13, 1960 | Plaza de Toros, Ciudad Juarez, Mexico | |
| 75 | Win | 55–18–2 | Enrique Esqueda | PTS | 10 | Aug 27, 1960 | Mexico City, Mexico | |
| 74 | Win | 54–18–2 | Johnny Gonsalves | UD | 10 | Jul 6, 1960 | Auditorium, Oakland, California, US | |
| 73 | Win | 53–18–2 | Karl Heinz Guder | UD | 10 | May 26, 1960 | Memorial Auditorium, Fresno, California, US | |
| 72 | Win | 52–18–2 | Armando Muniz | SD | 10 | May 17, 1960 | Plaza de Toros, Tijuana, Mexico | |
| 71 | Loss | 51–18–2 | Emile Griffith | SD | 10 | Feb 12, 1960 | Madison Square Garden, New York City, New York, US | |
| 70 | Win | 51–17–2 | Stan Harrington | UD | 10 | Jan 8, 1960 | Madison Square Garden, New York City, New York, US | |
| 69 | Loss | 50–17–2 | Florentino Fernández | SD | 10 | Oct 30, 1959 | Madison Square Garden, New York City, New York, US | |
| 68 | Loss | 50–16–2 | Florentino Fernández | UD | 10 | Sep 11, 1959 | Auditorium, Miami Beach, Florida, US | |
| 67 | Win | 50–15–2 | Benny 'Kid' Paret | SD | 10 | Aug 7, 1959 | Madison Square Garden, New York City, New York, US | |
| 66 | Win | 49–15–2 | Ray Terrazas | PTS | 10 | Jul 13, 1959 | Plaza de Toros, Tijuana, Mexico | |
| 65 | Win | 48–15–2 | Ray Terrazas | TKO | 10 (10), 2:44 | Jun 16, 1959 | Plaza de Toros, Ciudad Juarez, Mexico | |
| 64 | Loss | 47–15–2 | Rudell Stitch | UD | 10 | May 8, 1959 | War Memorial Auditorium, Syracuse, New York, US | |
| 63 | Win | 47–14–2 | Rudell Stitch | SD | 10 | Feb 6, 1959 | Madison Square Garden, New York City, New York, US | |
| 62 | Loss | 46–14–2 | Denny Moyer | SD | 10 | Jan 2, 1959 | Madison Square Garden, New York City, New York, US | |
| 61 | Loss | 46–13–2 | Don Jordan | SD | 12 | Oct 22, 1958 | Lafayette Hotel, Long Beach, California, US | |
| 60 | Loss | 46–12–2 | Don Jordan | SD | 10 | Sep 17, 1958 | Armory, Portland, Oregon, US | |
| 59 | Draw | 46–11–2 | Mickey Crawford | SD | 10 | Aug 13, 1958 | Madison Square Garden, New York City, New York, US | |
| 58 | Win | 46–11–1 | Mickey Crawford | SD | 10 | Jul 11, 1958 | Madison Square Garden, New York City, New York, US | |
| 57 | Win | 45–11–1 | Bobby Terrance | UD | 10 | May 12, 1958 | Sports Center, Tucson, Arizona, US | |
| 56 | Loss | 44–11–1 | Ralph Dupas | MD | 10 | Feb 5, 1958 | Municipal Auditorium, Norfolk, Virginia, US | |
| 55 | Loss | 44–10–1 | Isaac Logart | UD | 12 | Dec 6, 1957 | Arena, Cleveland, Ohio, US | |
| 54 | Win | 44–9–1 | Kid Gavilán | SD | 12 | Oct 22, 1957 | Wrigley Field, Los Angeles, California, US | |
| 53 | Win | 43–9–1 | David Cervantes | PTS | 10 | Sep 24, 1957 | Plaza de Toros, Ciudad Juarez, Mexico | |
| 52 | Loss | 42–9–1 | Kid Gavilán | UD | 10 | Jul 31, 1957 | Auditorium, Miami Beach, Florida, US | |
| 51 | Loss | 42–8–1 | Larry Baker | SD | 10 | Jul 3, 1957 | Auditorium, Miami Beach, Florida, US | |
| 50 | Win | 42–7–1 | Isaac Logart | SD | 12 | May 10, 1957 | War Memorial Auditorium, Syracuse, New York, US | |
| 49 | Win | 41–7–1 | Miguel Burciaga | KO | 2 (10) | Apr 1, 1957 | Baseball Park, Tijuana, Mexico | |
| 48 | Loss | 40–7–1 | Tony DeMarco | UD | 10 | Feb 9, 1957 | Boston Garden, Boston, Massachusetts, US | |
| 47 | Win | 40–6–1 | Tony DeMarco | SD | 10 | Dec 21, 1956 | Madison Square Garden, New York City, New York, US | |
| 46 | Win | 39–6–1 | Tony DeMarco | SD | 10 | Nov 23, 1956 | Madison Square Garden, New York City, New York, US | |
| 45 | Win | 38–6–1 | Isaac Logart | MD | 10 | Oct 17, 1956 | Mechanics Building, Boston, Massachusetts, US | |
| 44 | Win | 37–6–1 | Hardy Smallwood | UD | 10 | Sep 10, 1956 | Plaza de Toros, Tijuana, Mexico | |
| 43 | Win | 36–6–1 | Gene Poirier | MD | 10 | Jun 11, 1956 | St. Nicholas Arena, New York City, New York, US | |
| 42 | Loss | 35–6–1 | Hardy Smallwood | UD | 10 | Apr 2, 1956 | St. Nicholas Arena, New York City, New York, US | |
| 41 | Loss | 35–5–1 | Isaac Logart | UD | 10 | Mar 16, 1956 | Madison Square Garden, New York City, New York, US | |
| 40 | Win | 35–4–1 | Tex Gonzalez | PTS | 6 | Feb 10, 1956 | Madison Square Garden, New York City, New York, US | |
| 39 | Win | 34–4–1 | Tex Gonzalez | UD | 6 | Dec 7, 1955 | Arena, Cleveland, Ohio, US | |
| 38 | Loss | 33–4–1 | Tex Gonzalez | SD | 6 | Oct 28, 1955 | Arena, Cleveland, Ohio, US | |
| 37 | Win | 33–3–1 | Juan Tejada | UD | 10 | Oct 14, 1955 | War Memorial Auditorium, Syracuse, New York, US | |
| 36 | Win | 32–3–1 | Frank Bombiani | PTS | 4 | Aug 24, 1955 | Madison Square Garden, New York City, New York, US | |
| 35 | Loss | 31–3–1 | David Cervantes | PTS | 12 | Jun 12, 1955 | Mexicali, Mexico | For vacant Baja California Norte welterweight title |
| 34 | Win | 31–2–1 | Tony Esquivel | KO | 8 (10) | May 1, 1955 | Mexicali, Mexico | |
| 33 | Win | 30–2–1 | Jesse Robles | KO | 8 (10) | Apr 22, 1955 | Mexicali, Mexico | |
| 32 | Win | 29–2–1 | Tony Esquivel | KO | 3 (10) | Apr 16, 1955 | Ensenada, Mexico | |
| 31 | Win | 28–2–1 | David Cervantes | KO | 8 (10) | Mar 14, 1955 | Tijuana, Mexico | |
| 30 | Win | 27–2–1 | Al Villegas | KO | 3 (10) | Jan 21, 1955 | Tijuana, Mexico | |
| 29 | Win | 26–2–1 | Jesus del Ray | KO | 3 (10) | Dec 24, 1954 | Tijuana, Mexico | |
| 28 | Win | 25–2–1 | Gavilancillo Sonorense | KO | 3 (10) | Dec 19, 1954 | Tijuana, Mexico | |
| 27 | Loss | 24–2–1 | Tommy Barto | PTS | 8 | Nov 19, 1954 | Madison Square Garden, New York City, New York, US | |
| 26 | Win | 24–1–1 | Tony Celano | PTS | 10 | Sep 20, 1954 | Colonial Heights, Virginia, US | |
| 25 | Draw | 23–1–1 | Tommy Barto | PTS | 4 | Sep 10, 1954 | Madison Square Garden, New York City, New York, US | |
| 24 | Win | 23–1 | Iggy Maldonado | PTS | 4 | Aug 25, 1954 | Madison Square Garden, New York City, New York, US | |
| 23 | Win | 22–1 | Baby Franco | PTS | 10 | Jul 24, 1954 | Tijuana, Mexico | |
| 22 | Loss | 21–1 | David Cervantes | PTS | 10 | Jun 27, 1954 | Ensenada, Mexico | |
| 21 | Win | 21–0 | Alex Cano | KO | 6 (10) | Jan 2, 1954 | Ensenada, Mexico | |
| 20 | Win | 20–0 | Augustin Rosales | PTS | 10 | Dec 27, 1953 | San Luis Rio Colorado, Mexico | |
| 19 | Win | 19–0 | Tuzo Jimenez | PTS | 10 | Dec 13, 1953 | San Luis Rio Colorado, Mexico | |
| 18 | Win | 18–0 | Roca Reyes | PTS | 6 | Dec 6, 1953 | San Luis Rio Colorado, Mexico | |
| 17 | Win | 17–0 | Gavilancillo Sonorense | PTS | 8 | Dec 2, 1953 | San Luis Rio Colorado, Mexico | |
| 16 | Win | 16–0 | Baby Veloz | KO | 2 (8) | Nov 7, 1953 | Ensenada, Mexico | |
| 15 | Win | 15–0 | Ricardo Fox | PTS | 6 | Oct 12, 1953 | Tijuana, Mexico | |
| 14 | Win | 14–0 | Esteban Ruiz | KO | 2 (8) | Sep 26, 1953 | Ensenada, Mexico | |
| 13 | Win | 13–0 | Chalino Navarez | PTS | 8 | Jul 12, 1953 | San Luis Rio Colorado, Mexico | |
| 12 | Win | 12–0 | Chalino Navarez | PTS | 8 | Jul 5, 1953 | San Luis Rio Colorado, Mexico | |
| 11 | Win | 11–0 | Chamaco Ortiz | PTS | 8 | May 21, 1953 | San Luis Rio Colorado, Mexico | |
| 10 | Win | 10–0 | Arnoldo Gil | PTS | 8 | May 17, 1953 | San Luis Potosi, Mexico | |
| 9 | Win | 9–0 | Joe Ortega | KO | 7 (8) | May 10, 1953 | San Luis Rio Colorado, Mexico | |
| 8 | Win | 8–0 | Kid Charol | KO | 2 (8) | Apr 24, 1953 | Ensenada, Mexico | |
| 7 | Win | 7–0 | Chamaco Garcia | KO | 6 (8) | Mar 15, 1953 | Ensenada, Mexico | |
| 6 | Win | 6–0 | Negro Garcia | PTS | 6 | Mar 1, 1953 | Ensenada, Mexico | |
| 5 | Win | 5–0 | Negrito Desilao | KO | 2 (6) | Feb 28, 1953 | Ensenada, Mexico | |
| 4 | Win | 4–0 | Kid Alegria | KO | 6 (6) | Feb 15, 1953 | Mexicali, Mexico | |
| 3 | Win | 3–0 | Angel Rios | KO | 1 (6) | Jan 24, 1953 | San Luis Rio Colorado, Mexico | |
| 2 | Win | 2–0 | Tony Rojas | KO | 1 (6) | Jan 10, 1953 | San Luis Rio Colorado, Mexico | |
| 1 | Win | 1–0 | Miguel Ocana | KO | 1 (6) | Jan 1, 1953 | San Luis Rio Colorado, Mexico | |
