= Florentino Fernández =

Florentino Fernández may refer to:

- Florentino Fernández (actor) (born 1972), Spanish actor, comedian, conductor and showman
- Florentino Fernández (boxer) (1936–2013), Cuban boxer
