= Benny Paret =

Cuban boxer (1937–1962)

Benny "Kid" Paret
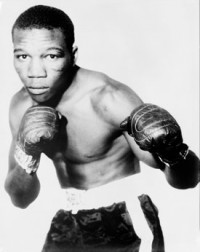

Personal information
- Nickname: Kid
- Born: Bernardo Paret; March 14, 1937 Santa Clara, Cuba
- Died: April 3, 1962 (aged 25) New York City, U.S.
- Weight: Welterweight
- Cause of death: Brain hemorrhaging from punches to his head in his match on March 24, 1962

Boxing career
- Stance: Orthodox

Boxing record
- Total fights: 50
- Wins: 35
- Win by KO: 10
- Losses: 12
- Draws: 3

Bernardo Paret (March 14, 1937 – April 3, 1962), known as Benny Paret or Benny "Kid" Paret, was a Cuban welterweight boxer who won the Undisputed World Welterweight Championship twice in the early 1960s.

Paret's death occurred 10 days after injuries sustained in a March 24, 1962, title defense against Emile Griffith, televised live and seen by millions on ABC's Fight of the Week. Paret had a lifetime record of 35 wins (10 knockouts), 12 losses and 3 draws.

== Boxing career ==
Paret won the welterweight title for the first time on May 27, 1960, by defeating Don Jordan. In his first defense of the title, Emile Griffith knocked him out in the thirteenth round on April 1, 1961. Paret recaptured the crown on September 30, 1961, in a split-decision over Griffith. Barely two months later, Paret took on middleweight champion Gene Fullmer and was knocked out in the tenth round, being behind on all three judges' scorecards.

== Last fight and death ==
Although Paret had been battered in the two fights with Griffith and the fight with Fullmer, he decided that he would defend his title against Griffith three months after the Fullmer fight. Paret–Griffith III was booked for Madison Square Garden on Saturday, March 24, 1962, and was televised live by ABC. In round six, Paret nearly knocked out Griffith with a multi-punch combination, but Griffith was saved by the bell.

In the twelfth round of the fight, Don Dunphy, who was calling the bout for ABC, remarked, "This is probably the tamest round of the entire fight." Seconds later, Griffith backed Paret into the corner before he unleashed a massive flurry of punches to the champion's head.

It quickly became apparent that Paret was dazed by the initial shots and could not defend himself, but referee Ruby Goldstein allowed Griffith to continue his assault. Finally, after 29 consecutive punches, which knocked Paret through the ropes at one point, Goldstein stepped in and called a halt to the bout.

Paret collapsed in the corner from the barrage of punches (initially thought to be from exhaustion), fell into a coma, and died ten days later at Roosevelt Hospital in Manhattan from massive brain hemorrhaging. Paret was buried at St. Raymond's New Cemetery, Bronx, New York on April 7, 1962.

The last fight between Paret and Griffith was the subject of many controversies. It is thought that one of the reasons Paret died was that he was vulnerable due to the beatings he took in his previous three fights, all of which happened within twelve months of each other. New York State boxing authorities were criticized for giving Paret clearance to fight just several months after the Fullmer fight. The actions of Paret at the weigh-in before his final fight have come under scrutiny. It is alleged that Paret taunted Griffith by calling him maricón (Spanish slang for "faggot").

Griffith wanted to fight Paret on the spot but was restrained. Griffith would come out as bisexual in his later years, but in 1962 allegations of homosexuality were considered fatal to an athlete's career and a particularly grievous insult in the culture both fighters came from. The referee Ruby Goldstein, a respected veteran, came under criticism for not stopping the fight sooner. It has been argued that Goldstein hesitated because of Paret's reputation for faking injury and Griffith's reputation as a poor finisher.

Another theory is that Goldstein was afraid that Paret's supporters would riot. The incident, combined with the death of Davey Moore a year later for a different injury in the ring, would cause debate as to whether boxing should be considered a sport. Boxing would not be televised on a regular basis again until the 1970s. The fight also marked the end of Goldstein's long and respected career as a referee, as he was unable to find work after that.

The fight was the centerpiece of a 2005 documentary entitled Ring of Fire: The Emile Griffith Story. At the end of the documentary, Griffith, who had harbored guilt over the incident over the years, is introduced to Paret's son. The son embraced Griffith and told him he was forgiven.

== In popular culture ==
Paret's death was chronicled in a 1962 protest song by folk singer Gil Turner. The song, "Benny 'Kid' Paret", was published in Broadside magazine that same month and was recorded later in the year by Turner's group, The New World Singers, for the 1963 Folkways album Broadside Ballads, Vol. 1.

A 1962 poem by Australian ex-boxer Merv Lilley urged us to remember Benny Paret "when they're lacing leather on."

The emotive poem "Muerte en el Ring" ("Death in the Ring") by Afro-Peruvian poet Nicomedes Santa Cruz recounts Paret's life to the moment of his last breath.

A semifictionalized story of the fight was told live by radio dramatist Joe Frank in the 1978 program "80 Yard Run" on WBAI in New York and replayed several times subsequently on NPR. In it, Frank cast Griffith rather than Paret as the defending champion and makes no mention of Paret's recent fights or his prior history with Griffith. In the dramatized version, Griffith dominates the fight from the beginning, with the fight ending in the middle rounds and Paret dying later that night.

Paret is also one of many boxers named in the lyrics of Sun Kil Moon's 2003 album Ghosts of the Great Highway. The album builds several songs around the stories of boxers who died early deaths.

The story of Emile Griffith and Paret's death has been turned into an Opera in Jazz, Champion. It premiered at Opera Theatre of Saint Louis on 15 June 2013 and made its Metropolitan Opera debut on 10 April 2023. The opera was written by composer Terence Blanchard, with a libretto by playwright Michael Cristofer, who went on to develop the stage play "Man in the Ring" on the same subject. The play premiered at the Court Theatre in Chicago in 2016.

== Professional boxing record ==
50 fights	35 wins	12 losses
By knockout	10	4
By decision	25	8
Draws	3	

No.	Result	Record	Opponent	Type	Round	Date	Location	Notes
50	Loss	35–12–3	Emile Griffith	TKO	12 (15)	Mar 24, 1962	Madison Square Garden, New York City, U.S.	Lost NYSAC, NBA, The Ring welterweight titles; Paret died from injuries sustained in the fight
49	Loss	35–11–3	Gene Fullmer	KO	10 (15)	Dec 9, 1961	Convention Center, Las Vegas, Nevada, U.S.	For NBA middleweight title
48	Win	35–10–3	Emile Griffith	SD	15	Sep 30, 1961	Madison Square Garden, New York City, U.S.	Won NYSAC, NBA, and The Ring welterweight titles
47	Loss	34–10–3	Emile Griffith	KO	13 (15)	Apr 1, 1961	Convention Center, Miami Beach, Miami, Florida, U.S.	Lost NYSAC, NBA, and The Ring welterweight titles
46	Loss	34–9–3	Gaspar Ortega	UD	10	Feb 25, 1961	Olympic Auditorium, Los Angeles, California, U.S.	
45	Win	34–8–3	Luis Federico Thompson	UD	15	Dec 10, 1960	Madison Square Garden, New York City, U.S.	Retained NYSAC, NBA, and The Ring welterweight titles
44	Loss	33–8–3	Denny Moyer	SD	10	Aug 16, 1960	Madison Square Garden, New York City, U.S.	
43	Win	33–7–3	Garnet Hart	KO	6 (10)	Jul 12, 1960	Madison Square Garden, New York City, U.S.	
42	Win	32–7–3	Don Jordan	UD	15	May 27, 1960	Convention Center, Las Vegas, Nevada, U.S.	Won NYSAC, NBA, and The Ring welterweight titles
41	Draw	31–7–3	Luis Federico Thompson	PTS	12	Mar 25, 1960	Madison Square Garden, New York City, U.S.	
40	Win	31–7–2	Charley Scott	SD	10	Jan 29, 1960	Madison Square Garden, New York City, U.S.	
39	Win	30–7–2	Charley Scott	UD	10	Dec 18, 1959	Madison Square Garden, New York City, U.S.	
38	Win	29–7–2	Bob Provizzi	UD	10	Nov 16, 1959	Academy of Music, New York City, U.S.	
37	Draw	28–7–2	José Torres	PTS	10	Sep 26, 1959	Sixto Escobar Stadium, San Juan, Puerto Rico	
36	Loss	28–7–1	Gaspar Ortega	SD	10	Aug 7, 1959	Madison Square Garden, New York City, U.S.	
35	Win	28–6–1	Rudy Sawyer	UD	10	Jun 1, 1959	St. Nicholas Arena, New York City, U.S.	
34	Loss	27–6–1	Eddie Thompson	SD	10	Apr 20, 1959	St. Nicholas Arena, New York City, U.S.	
33	Loss	27–5–1	Cecil Shorts	MD	10	Mar 2, 1959	St. Nicholas Arena, New York City, U.S.	
32	Win	27–4–1	Victor Zalazar	UD	10	Jan 19, 1959	St. Nicholas Arena, New York City, U.S.	
31	Win	26–4–1	Victor Zalazar	SD	10	Dec 15, 1958	St. Nicholas Arena, New York City, U.S.	
30	Win	25–4–1	Barry Allison	UD	10	Nov 24, 1958	St. Nicholas Arena, New York City, U.S.	
29	Win	24–4–1	Andy Figaro	KO	1 (10)	Nov 10, 1958	St. Nicholas Arena, New York City, U.S.	
28	Loss	23–4–1	Luis Manuel Rodríguez	SD	10	Aug 9, 1958	Coliseo de la Ciudad, Havana, Cuba	
27	Win	23–3–1	Augustin Rosales	TKO	8 (10)	Jun 21, 1958	Coliseo de la Ciudad, Havana, Cuba	
26	Win	22–3–1	Eddie Armstrong	UD	10	Jun 9, 1958	St. Nicholas Arena, New York City, U.S.	
25	Draw	21–3–1	Bobby Shell	PTS	6	May 19, 1958	St. Nicholas Arena, New York City, U.S.	
24	Win	21–3	Tony Armenteros	PTS	10	Mar 8, 1958	Palacio de Deportes, Havana, Cuba	
23	Loss	20–3	Luis Manuel Rodríguez	UD	10	Feb 8, 1958	Palacio de Deportes, Havana, Cuba	
22	Win	20–2	Rolando Rodriguez	PTS	8	Jan 25, 1958	Palacio de Deportes, Havana, Cuba	
21	Win	19–2	Regino Bravo	KO	3 (8)	Jan 4, 1958	Arena Trejo, Havana, Cuba	
20	Win	18–2	Rolando Rodriguez	KO	5 (8)	May 25, 1957	Palacio de Deportes, Havana, Cuba	
19	Win	17–2	Carlos Chibas	PTS	8	May 4, 1957	Palacio de Deportes, Havana, Cuba	
18	Loss	16–2	Guillermo Diaz	PTS	8	Apr 6, 1957	Palacio de Deportes, Havana, Cuba	
17	Win	16–1	Rolando Rodriguez	PTS	8	Mar 23, 1957	Palacio de Deportes, Havana, Cuba	
16	Win	15–1	Oscar Campos	UD	8	Mar 9, 1957	Palacio de Deportes, Havana, Cuba	
15	Win	14–1	Oscar Campos	PTS	10	Feb 1, 1957	Santa Clara, Cuba	
14	Loss	13–1	Rolando Rodriguez	KO	2 (8)	Oct 22, 1956	Santa Clara, Cuba	
13	Win	13–0	Carlos Chibas	KO	2 (8)	Oct 13, 1956	Santa Clara, Cuba	
12	Win	12–0	Leocadio Villafanas	KO	3 (8)	Aug 9, 1956	Santa Clara, Cuba	
11	Win	11–0	Carlos Chibas	PTS	8	Jul 21, 1956	Palacio de Deportes, Havana, Cuba	
10	Win	10–0	Tony Caspita	PTS	8	Jun 6, 1956	Santa Clara, Cuba	
9	Win	9–0	Reinaldo Cabellero	KO	3 (6)	Mar 16, 1956	Santa Clara, Cuba	
8	Win	8–0	Jose Delgado	KO	4 (6)	Jan 27, 1956	Santa Clara, Cuba	
7	Win	7–0	Joaquin Castillo	PTS	6	Dec 23, 1955	Santa Clara, Cuba	
6	Win	6–0	Jose Delgado	PTS	6	Dec 2, 1955	Santa Clara, Cuba	
5	Win	5–0	Sandalio Santana	PTS	6	Oct 26, 1955	Santa Clara, Cuba	
4	Win	4–0	Miguel Cutino	TKO	4	Oct 22, 1955	Palacio de Deportes, Havana, Cuba	
3	Win	3–0	Joel Morales	PTS	4	Sep 8, 1955	Santa Clara, Cuba	
2	Win	2–0	Esmerido Moya	KO	1 (4)	Aug 11, 1955	Santa Clara, Cuba	
1	Win	1–0	Oscar Campos	PTS	6	Apr 16, 1954	Santa Clara, Cuba	

== Titles in boxing ==
=== Major world titles ===
- NYSAC welterweight champion (147 lbs) (2×)
- NBA (WBA) welterweight champion (147 lbs) (2×)

=== The Ring magazine titles ===
- The Ring welterweight champion (147 lbs) (2×)

=== Undisputed titles ===
- Undisputed welterweight champion (2×)

== See also ==
- Kim Duk-koo
- List of welterweight boxing champions

Sporting positions
World boxing titles
Preceded by Don Jordan	NYSAC welterweight champion May 27, 1960 – April 1, 1961	Succeeded by Emile Griffith
Preceded by Don Jordan	NBA welterweight champion May 27, 1960 – April 1, 1961	Succeeded by Emile Griffith
Preceded by Don Jordan	The Ring welterweight champion May 27, 1960 – April 1, 1961	Succeeded by Emile Griffith
Preceded by Don Jordan	Undisputed welterweight champion May 27, 1960 – April 1, 1961	Succeeded by Emile Griffith
Preceded by Emile Griffith	NYSAC welterweight champion September 30, 1961 – March 24, 1962	Succeeded by Emile Griffith
Preceded by Emile Griffith	NBA welterweight champion September 30, 1961 – March 24, 1962	Succeeded by Emile Griffith
Preceded by Emile Griffith	The Ring welterweight champion September 30, 1961 – March 24, 1962	Succeeded by Emile Griffith
Preceded by Emile Griffith	Undisputed welterweight champion September 30, 1961 – March 24, 1962	Succeeded by Emile Griffith
Records
Preceded by Marcel Cerdan	Latest born world champion to die April 3, 1962 – February 15, 1970	Succeeded by Carlos Cruz
