= Luis Federico Thompson =

Argentine boxer (1927–2010)

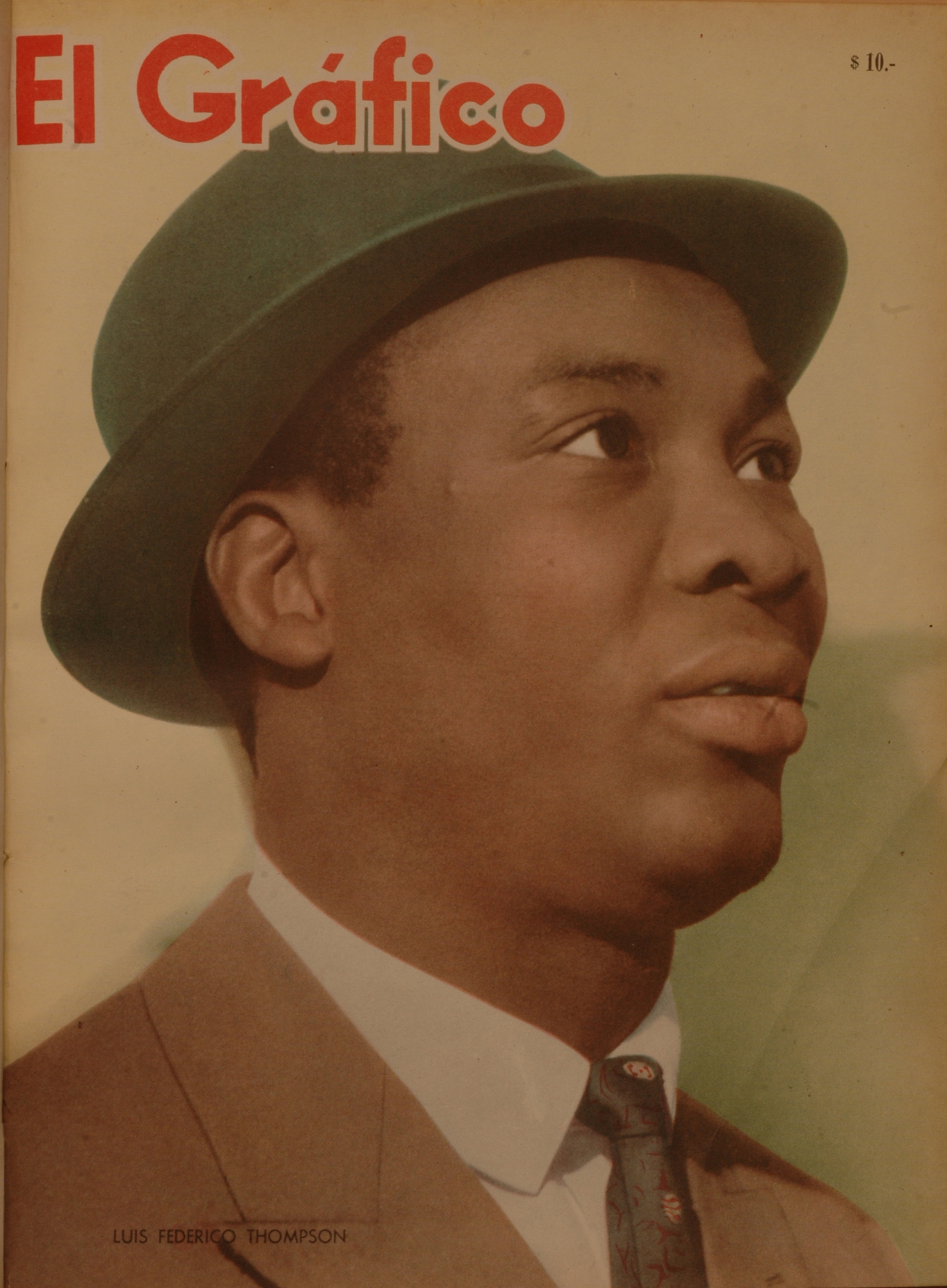
- Thompson on the cover of El Gráfico in 1960

Personal information
- Nickname: Negro
- Nationality: Argentine
- Born: 19 December 1927 Colon, Panama
- Died: 8 January 2010 (aged 82) Buenos Aires, Argentina
- Height: 173 cm (5 ft 8 in)
- Weight: Lightweight; Welterweight

Boxing career
- Stance: Orthodox

Boxing record
- Total fights: 180
- Wins: 150
- Win by KO: 72
- Losses: 14
- Draws: 15
- No contests: 1

Luis Federico Thompson (19 December 1927 – 8 January 2010) was an Argentine professional boxer. Born in Colon, Panama, he later moved to Argentina where he was nationalized and afterwards became the Argentine and South American boxing champion.

== Career ==
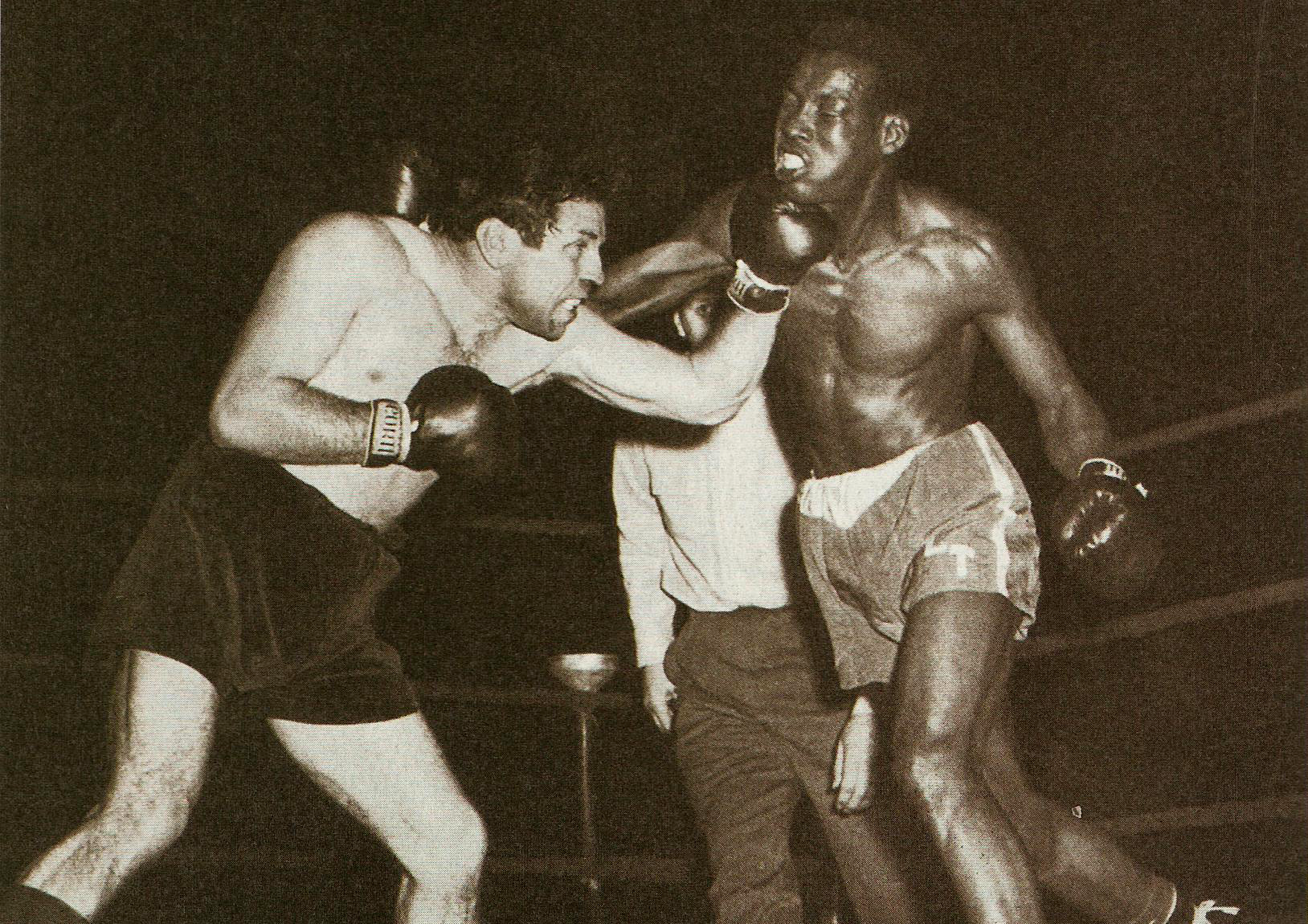
Thompson vs. José María Gatica, circa 1952

Thompson debuted in 1947 with a fight against Wilfredo Brown in Panama City which ended in a draw. On 7 October 1951, he fought Wilfredo Brewster defeating him and winning the Panamanian Lightweight Title for the first time. Two months later, he fought Wilfredo Brown again. Brown won the match by TKO in the 8th round taking the title from Thompson. A month later on 27 January 1952, Thompson and Brown had their second rematch where Thompson won by decision, reclaiming the Panamanian Lightweight Title in the process.

Thompson traveled to Luna Park in Buenos Aires for his 12 July 1952, fight against local boxer José María Gatica. Thompson lost by knockout in the 8th round. He decided to move to Argentina. In 1959, he defeated Cirilo Gil to become the Argentine champion.

Thompson traveled to New York City for his 25 March 1960 fight against Benny Paret. The fight ended in a draw. They had a rematch on 10 December 1960. Thompson was defeated by unanimous decision.

On 6 October 1962, he defeated Jorge Peralta to win the South American Welterweight title. His last fight was against Raul Roldan on 14 November 1963, where Thompson won by decision.

Thompson died on 8 January 2010, in Buenos Aires, Argentina after a long battle with illness.

== Professional boxing record ==
180 fights	150 wins	14 losses
By knockout	72	2
By decision	77	11
By disqualification	1	1
Draws	15	
No contests	1	

No.	Result	Record	Opponent	Type	Round, time	Date	Location	Notes
180	Win	150–14–15 (1)	Raul Roldan	PTS	10	14 Nov 1963	Rosario, Argentina	
179	Win	149–14–15 (1)	Juan Carlos Velardez	PTS	10	1 Nov 1963	Estadio Luis Firpo, Concepcion, Argentina	
178	Draw	148–14–15 (1)	Roberto Chetta	PTS	10	12 Oct 1963	Comodoro Rivadavia, Argentina	
177	Win	148–14–14 (1)	Jorge Peralta	PTS	15	28 Sep 1963	Buenos Aires, Argentina	Won South American welterweight title
176	Win	147–14–14 (1)	Marcelo Garnica	PTS	10	15 Aug 1963	Río Gallegos, Argentina	
175	Draw	146–14–14 (1)	Jose Antonio Burgos	PTS	10	28 Jul 1963	Buenos Aires, Argentina	
174	Win	146–14–13 (1)	Alfredo Paz	PTS	10	5 Jul 1963	Cordoba, Argentina	
173	Win	145–14–13 (1)	Rogelio Andre	PTS	10	21 Jun 1963	Bahia Blanca, Argentina	
172	Win	144–14–13 (1)	Marcelo Garnica	PTS	10	1 May 1963	Bolívar, Argentina	Date unknown
171	Loss	143–14–13 (1)	Oscar Miranda	PTS	10	10 Apr 1963	San Miguel, Argentina	
170	Win	143–13–13 (1)	Marcelo Garnica	PTS	10	1 Apr 1963	Villa Ballester, Argentina	Date unknown
169	Win	142–13–13 (1)	Roberto Chetta	PTS	10	16 Mar 1963	Buenos Aires, Argentina	
168	Win	141–13–13 (1)	Francisco Gelabert	PTS	10	22 Feb 1963	Ciudad Mendoza, Argentina	
167	Win	140–13–13 (1)	Marcelo Garnica	PTS	10	1 Jan 1963	Lanus, Argentina	Date unknown
166	NC	139–13–13 (1)	Emilio Ale Ali	NC	8 (10)	21 Dec 1962	San Miguel de Tucumán, Argentina	
165	Win	139–13–13	Juan Carlos Ducay	PTS	10	8 Dec 1962	Buenos Aires, Argentina	
164	Win	138–13–13	Ramon Rocha	PTS	10	1 Dec 1962	La Emilia, Argentina	
163	Draw	137–13–13	Roberto Chetta	PTS	10	9 Nov 1962	Santa Fe, Argentina	
162	Win	137–13–12	Carlos Victor Diaz	KO	4 (10)	19 Oct 1962	Bahia Blanca, Argentina	
161	Win	136–13–12	Jorge Peralta	PTS	15	6 Oct 1962	Estadio Luna Park, Buenos Aires, Argentina	
160	Win	135–13–12	Ramon Paz	TKO	5 (10)	14 Sep 1962	Posadas, Argentina	
159	Win	134–13–12	Ricardo Falech	PTS	12	18 Aug 1962	Estadio Luna Park, Buenos Aires, Argentina	Retained Argentina welterweight title
158	Win	133–13–12	Emilio Ale Ali	PTS	10	28 Jul 1962	Beunos Aires, Argentina	
157	Draw	132–13–12	Antonio Marcilla	PTS	10	10 Jun 1962	Beunos Aires, Argentina	
156	Draw	132–13–11	Oscar Miranda	PTS	10	11 May 1962	San Miguel, Argentina	
155	Win	132–13–10	Pedro Miranda	PTS	10	8 Apr 1962	Arena de Colon, Colon City, Panama	
154	Win	131–13–10	Anibal Reyes	KO	5 (10)	1 Mar 1962	Temperley, Argentina	
153	Loss	130–13–10	Dick Turner	MD	8	22 Feb 1962	Blue Horizon, Philadelphia, Pennsylvania, US	
152	Loss	130–12–10	Luis Manuel Rodríguez	UD	10	27 Jan 1962	Madison Square Garden, New York City, New York, US	
151	Win	130–11–10	Juan Carlos Ducay	PTS	15	23 Dec 1961	Buenos Aires, Argentina	Retained Argentina welterweight title
150	Win	129–11–10	Jose Caceres	TKO	2 (10)	3 Nov 1961	Rivadavia, Argentina	
149	Win	128–11–10	Alfredo Paz	PTS	10	27 Oct 1961	Cordoba, Argentina	
148	Win	127–11–10	Ramon Perello	KO	2 (10)	17 May 1961	Temperley, Argentina	
147	Loss	126–11–10	Ted Wright	UD	10	18 Mar 1961	St. Nicholas Arena, New York City, New York, US	
146	Win	126–10–10	Alfredo Navarro	TKO	2 (10)	24 Feb 1961	La Plata, Argentina	
145	Loss	125–10–10	Benny Paret	UD	15	10 Dec 1960	Madison Square Garden, New York City, New York, US	For NYSAC, NBA, and The Ring welterweight titles
144	Win	125–9–10	Gaspar Ortega	UD	10	29 Oct 1960	Madison Square Garden, New York City, New York, US	
143	Win	124–9–10	Jorge Peralta	KO	5 (10)	6 Aug 1960	Palacio Peñarol, Montevideo, Uruguay	
142	Win	123–9–10	Charley Tombstone Smith	UD	10	25 Jun 1960	Estadio Luna Park, Buenos Aires, Argentina	
141	Win	122–9–10	Adalberto Ochoa	UD	12	24 May 1960	Estadio Luna Park, Buenos Aires, Argentina	Retained Argentina welterweight title
140	Draw	121–9–10	Benny Paret	MD	12	25 Mar 1960	Madison Square Garden, New York City, New York, US	
139	Win	121–9–9	Angel Ahumada	PTS	10	19 Feb 1960	Cordoba, Argentina	
138	Win	120–9–9	Adalberto Ochoa	UD	10	6 Feb 1960	Estadio Luna Park, Buenos Aires, Argentina	
137	Win	119–9–9	Don Jordan	KO	4 (10)	12 Dec 1959	Estadio Luna Park, Buenos Aires, Argentina	
136	Win	118–9–9	Juan Carlos Velardez	PTS	10	4 Dec 1959	San Miguel de Tucumán, Argentina	
135	Win	117–9–9	Francisco Sotelo	TKO	3 (10)	9 Oct 1959	Ciudad Mendoza, Argentina	
134	Win	116–9–9	Cesar Pereyra	TKO	7 (10)	25 Sep 1959	Bahia Blanca, Argentina	
133	Win	115–9–9	Anibal Rojas	KO	1 (10)	12 Sep 1959	Club Ramon Santamarina, Tandil, Argentina	
132	Win	114–9–9	Cirilo Gil	PTS	12	22 Aug 1959	Estadio Luna Park, Buenos Aires, Argentina	Won Argentina welterweight title
131	Win	113–9–9	Jorge Fernandez	PTS	10	4 Jul 1959	Estadio Luna Park, Buenos Aires, Argentina	
130	Win	112–9–9	Francisco Sotelo	PTS	10	18 Apr 1959	Ciudad Mendoza, Argentina	
129	Win	111–9–9	Juan Carlos Zalazar	TKO	6 (10)	25 Mar 1959	Temperley, Argentina	
128	Win	110–9–9	Miguel Amatti	PTS	10	18 Feb 1959	Parana, Argentina	
127	Win	109–9–9	Jose Ramallo	KO	8 (10)	4 Feb 1959	Santa Fe, Argentina	
126	Draw	108–9–9	Issac Logart	PTS	10	20 Dec 1958	Estadio Luna Park, Buenos Aires, Argentina	
125	Win	108–9–8	Cayetano Tapia	TKO	6 (10)	6 Dec 1958	Quilmes, Argentina	
124	Win	107–9–8	Angel Ahumada	KO	4 (10)	11 Oct 1958	Buenos Aires, Argentina	
123	Win	106–9–8	Kiko Gill	KO	2 (10)	4 Oct 1958	Misiones, Argentina	
122	Win	105–9–8	Francisco Espelozin	PTS	10	5 Sep 1958	Cordoba, Argentina	
121	Win	104–9–8	Alberto Billaflor	PTS	10	22 Aug 1958	Pergamino, Argentina	
120	Win	103–9–8	Alberto Rodriguez	TKO	9 (10)	27 Jun 1958	La Plata, Argentina	
119	Win	102–9–8	Federico Guerra	KO	3 (10)	13 Jun 1958	Rio Cuarto, Argentina	
118	Win	101–9–8	Jorge Foffani	TKO	6 (10)	1 Jun 1958	Rio Cuarto, Argentina	
117	Win	100–9–8	Miguel Salteno	KO	6 (10)	30 May 1958	San Nicolas, Argentina	
116	Win	99–9–8	Miguel Salteno	TKO	6 (10)	23 May 1958	San Nicolas, Argentina	
115	Win	98–9–8	Enrique Mansilla	KO	8 (10)	3 May 1958	Junin, Argentina	
114	Win	97–9–8	Angel Bello	TKO	8 (10)	23 Apr 1958	Cordoba, Argentina	
113	Win	96–9–8	Santiago Meza	KO	5 (10)	16 Apr 1958	La Plata, Argentina	
112	Win	95–9–8	Oscar Paez	TKO	8 (10)	21 Mar 1958	Quilmes, Argentina	
111	Win	94–9–8	Bernardo Romero	PTS	10	12 Mar 1958	San Miguel de Tucumán, Argentina	
110	Win	93–9–8	Carmelo Sosa	KO	3 (10)	28 Feb 1958	San Miguel de Tucumán, Argentina	
109	Win	92–9–8	Angel Bello	PTS	10	14 Feb 1958	Mar del Plata, Argentina	
108	Win	91–9–8	Angel Gregorutti	KO	2 (10)	31 Jan 1958	Mar del Plata, Argentina	
107	Loss	90–9–8	Cirilo Gil	PTS	10	30 Nov 1957	Buenos Aires, Argentina	
106	Win	90–8–8	Günter Hase	PTS	10	7 Sep 1957	Buenos Aires, Argentina	
105	Win	89–8–8	Juan Carlos Rivero	PTS	10	3 Aug 1957	Estadio Luna Park, Buenos Aires, Argentina	
104	Win	88–8–8	Manuel Pereyra	KO	3 (10)	19 Jul 1957	Pergamino, Argentina	
103	Win	87–8–8	Oscar Ramirez	TKO	6 (10)	6 Jul 1957	Estadio Luna Park, Buenos Aires, Argentina	
102	Win	86–8–8	Bernardo Romero	PTS	10	30 Jun 1957	Pergamino, Argentina	
101	Win	85–8–8	Ramon Vargas	TKO	2 (10)	22 Jun 1957	Buenos Aires, Argentina	
100	Win	84–8–8	Horacio Rivero	TKO	6 (10)	17 May 1957	Rosario, Argentina	
99	Win	83–8–8	Miguel Gozalvez	KO	3 (10)	5 Apr 1957	Moron, Argentina	
98	Win	82–8–8	Angel Bello	PTS	10	15 Mar 1957	Parana, Argentina	
97	Win	81–8–8	Ramon Perello	PTS	10	22 Feb 1957	Rafaela, Argentina	
96	Loss	80–8–8	Angel Bello	PTS	10	1 Feb 1957	Mar del Plata, Argentina	
95	Draw	80–7–8	Hector Pedro Rodriguez	PTS	10	28 Dec 1956	Estadio Centenario, Montevideo, Uruguay	
94	Win	80–7–7	Miguel Luchesi	KO	4 (10)	19 Dec 1956	San Miguel de Tucumán, Argentina	
93	Draw	79–7–7	Angel Bello	PTS	10	7 Dec 1956	San Miguel de Tucumán, Argentina	
92	Win	79–7–6	Enrique Corti	TKO	5 (10)	13 Nov 1956	San Miguel de Tucumán, Argentina	
91	Win	78–7–6	Angel Bello	PTS	10	24 Oct 1956	San Miguel de Tucumán, Argentina	
90	Win	77–7–6	Ramon Perello	PTS	10	5 Oct 1956	San Miguel de Tucumán, Argentina	
89	Win	76–7–6	Aquiles Gregorutti	PTS	10	21 Sep 1956	San Miguel de Tucumán, Argentina	
88	Win	75–7–6	Miguel Santangelo	TKO	5 (10)	14 Sep 1956	Rosario, Argentina	
87	Win	74–7–6	Ricardo Lopez	KO	7 (10)	29 Jun 1956	Ramos Mejia, Argentina	
86	Win	73–7–6	Aquiles Gregorutti	PTS	10	1 Jun 1956	San Miguel de Tucumán, Argentina	
85	Win	72–7–6	Julio Dartuqui	PTS	10	18 May 1956	San Miguel de Tucumán, Argentina	
84	Win	71–7–6	Miguel Amatti	TKO	9 (10)	22 Mar 1956	San Miguel de Tucumán, Argentina	
83	Win	70–7–6	Ramon Perello	TKO	7 (10)	10 Feb 1956	Santa Fe, Argentina	
82	Win	69–7–6	Federico Guerra	TKO	6 (10)	2 Dec 1955	San Miguel de Tucumán, Argentina	
81	Win	68–7–6	Juan Oviedo	TKO	6 (10)	11 Nov 1955	San Juan, Argentina	
80	Draw	67–7–6	Federico Guerra	PTS	10	15 Oct 1955	San Juan, Argentina	
79	Win	67–7–5	Dante Pereyra	PTS	10	9 Sep 1955	San Miguel de Tucumán, Argentina	
78	Win	66–7–5	Oscar Flores	PTS	10	2 Sep 1955	San Miguel, Argentina	
77	Win	65–7–5	Dante Pereyra	PTS	10	5 Aug 1955	San Miguel de Tucumán, Argentina	
76	Win	64–7–5	Carlos Alberto Rovira	KO	7 (10)	22 Jul 1955	San Miguel, Argentina	
75	Win	63–7–5	Antonio Alba	KO	4 (10)	8 Jul 1955	San Miguel de Tucumán, Argentina	
74	Win	62–7–5	Oscar Flores	PTS	10	1 Jul 1955	San Miguel, Argentina	
73	Loss	61–7–5	Luis Penedo	DQ	4 (10)	24 Jun 1955	La Plata, Argentina	
72	Win	61–6–5	Luis Penedo	PTS	10	20 May 1955	San Miguel de Tucumán, Argentina	
71	Win	60–6–5	Teofilo Paez	PTS	10	29 Apr 1955	San Miguel de Tucumán, Argentina	
70	Loss	59–6–5	Federico Guerra	PTS	10	1 Apr 1955	Ciudad Mendoza, Argentina	
69	Win	59–5–5	Jose Legardon	TKO	4 (10)	25 Mar 1955	San Miguel de Tucumán, Argentina	
68	Win	58–5–5	Rufino Farias	TKO	8 (10)	16 Mar 1955	San Miguel, Argentina	
67	Win	57–5–5	Federico Guerra	TKO	9 (10)	2 Mar 1955	Buenos Aires, Argentina	
66	Win	56–5–5	Rene Pereyra	PTS	10	20 Feb 1955	Sunchales, Argentina	
65	Win	55–5–5	Oscar Ponce	KO	4 (10)	28 Jan 1955	San Juan, Argentina	
64	Win	54–5–5	Vicente Sarmiento	TKO	7 (10)	14 Jan 1955	San Juan, Argentina	
63	Win	53–5–5	Silverio De La Fuente	TKO	5 (10)	8 Jan 1955	Ciudad Mendoza, Argentina	
62	Win	52–5–5	Antonio Martinez	KO	7 (10)	19 Nov 1954	Catamarca, Argentina	
61	Win	51–5–5	Ramon Gomez	PTS	10	10 Nov 1954	Catamarca, Argentina	
60	Win	50–5–5	Miguel Gozalvez	PTS	10	8 Oct 1954	Santa Fe, Argentina	
59	Win	49–5–5	Eleuterio Pereyra	PTS	10	1 Oct 1954	Comodoro Rivadavia, Argentina	Date unknown
58	Win	48–5–5	Adolfo Ygriega	PTS	10	1 Oct 1954	Tandil, Argentina	
57	Win	47–5–5	Angel Bello	PTS	10	10 Sep 1954	La Plata, Argentina	
56	Loss	46–5–5	Angel Bello	PTS	10	3 Sep 1954	Bahia Blanca, Argentina	
55	Win	46–4–5	Angel Bello	KO	2 (10)	20 Aug 1954	Tandil, Argentina	
54	Win	45–4–5	Angel Bello	PTS	10	7 Aug 1954	Trelew, Argentina	
53	Win	44–4–5	Dante Pereyra	PTS	10	31 Jul 1954	Comodoro Rivadavia, Argentina	
52	Loss	43–4–5	Eusebio Pereyra	PTS	10	24 Jul 1954	Molino de Oro, Trelew, Argentina	
51	Win	43–3–5	Omar Ponce	PTS	10	17 Jul 1954	Comodoro Rivadavia, Argentina	
50	Win	42–3–5	Rene Pereyra	PTS	10	10 Jul 1954	Comodoro Rivadavia, Argentina	
49	Win	41–3–5	Manuel Contreras	KO	3 (10)	5 Jun 1954	Club Ramon Santamarina, Tandil, Argentina	
48	Win	40–3–5	Manuel Contreras	KO	2 (10)	4 Jun 1954	Tandil, Argentina	
47	Win	39–3–5	Tulio Medina	TKO	7 (10)	23 Apr 1954	San Miguel de Tucumán, Argentina	
46	Win	38–3–5	Juan Carlos Rondan	KO	3 (10)	14 Apr 1954	San Miguel de Tucumán, Argentina	
45	Win	37–3–5	Rene Pereyra	PTS	10	1 Apr 1954	Comodoro Rivadavia, Argentina	Date unknown
44	Win	36–3–5	Jose Maria Claris	TKO	5 (10)	21 Jan 1954	Parana, Argentina	
43	Win	35–3–5	Lorenzo Salas	TKO	4 (10)	22 Dec 1953	Parana, Argentina	
42	Win	34–3–5	Enrique Irureta	PTS	10	7 Nov 1953	Cine Boston, Montevideo, Uruguay	
41	Win	33–3–5	Oscar Rojas	TKO	4 (10)	31 Oct 1953	Comodoro Rivadavia, Argentina	
40	Win	32–3–5	Enrique Irureta	PTS	10	6 Oct 1953	Cine Boston, Montevideo, Uruguay	
39	Win	31–3–5	Adolfo Ygriega	PTS	10	26 Sep 1953	Mar del Plata, Argentina	
38	Win	30–3–5	Adolfo Ygriega	PTS	10	10 Aug 1953	Bahia Blanca, Argentina	
37	Draw	29–3–5	Alfonso Moreno	PTS	12	22 Jul 1953	Buenos Aires, Argentina	
36	Win	29–3–4	Ramon Vargas	PTS	10	5 Jul 1953	Santa Fe, Argentina	
35	Win	28–3–4	Guillermo Torres	KO	1 (10)	29 Jun 1953	Bahia Blanca, Argentina	
34	Win	27–3–4	Jose Retamales	KO	4 (10)	4 Jun 1953	Bahia Blanca, Argentina	
33	Draw	26–3–4	Alfonso Moreno	PTS	10	18 May 1953	La Rioja, Argentina	
32	Draw	26–3–3	Silverio De La Fuente	PTS	10	18 Apr 1953	Ciudad Mendoza, Argentina	
31	Win	26–3–2	Adolfo Ygriega	PTS	10	11 Apr 1953	Mar del Plata, Argentina	
30	Win	25–3–2	Oscar Schiavelli	DQ	6 (10)	28 Mar 1953	Buenos Aires, Argentina	
29	Win	24–3–2	Cecilio Niz	TKO	7 (10)	14 Mar 1953	Buenos Aires, Argentina	
28	Win	23–3–2	Jose Alvarez	PTS	10	4 Feb 1953	Lomas de Zamora, Argentina	
27	Win	22–3–2	Jose Palacin	TKO	1 (10)	16 Jan 1953	Lomas de Zamora, Argentina	
26	Win	21–3–2	Silverio De La Fuente	PTS	10	13 Dec 1952	Ciudad Mendoza, Argentina	
25	Win	20–3–2	Baby Tigre	TKO	4 (10)	2 Dec 1952	Buenos Aires, Argentina	
24	Win	19–3–2	Alberto Salinas	KO	3 (10)	21 Nov 1952	Moron, Argentina	
23	Win	18–3–2	Ernesto Tello	TKO	4 (10)	14 Nov 1952	La Tapera, Moron, Argentina	
22	Win	17–3–2	Esteban Niz	TKO	6 (?)	7 Nov 1952	Zarate, Argentina	
21	Draw	16–3–2	Oscar Aceffe	PTS	12	20 Sep 1952	Estadio Luna Park, Buenos Aires, Argentina	
20	Win	16–3–1	Pascual D'Alessandro	KO	9 (10)	27 Aug 1952	Buenos Aires, Argentina	
19	Loss	15–3–1	José María Gatica	KO	8 (10)	12 Jul 1952	Buenos Aires, Argentina	
18	Loss	15–2–1	Wilfredo Brown	PTS	15	27 Jan 1952	Estadio Olimpico, Panama City, Panama	For Panama lightweight title
17	Loss	15–1–1	Wilfredo Brown	TKO	8 (15), 2:40	2 Dec 1951	Arena de Colon, Colon City, Panama	Lost Panama lightweight title
16	Win	15–0–1	Wilfredo Brewster	KO	7 (15), 0:31	7 Oct 1951	Gimnasio Nacional, Panama City, Panama	Won Panama lightweight title
15	Win	14–0–1	Kid Chocolate II	PTS	10	9 Sep 1951	Gimnasio Nacional, Panama City, Panama	
14	Win	13–0–1	Leonel Peralta	PTS	10	15 Jul 1951	Gimnasio Nacional, Panama City, Panama	
13	Win	12–0–1	Leonel Peralta	TKO	3 (10), 1:04	3 Jun 1951	Gimnasio Nacional, Panama City, Panama	
12	Win	11–0–1	Al Marshall	KO	2 (6)	25 Mar 1951	Arena de Colon, Colon City, Panama	
11	Win	10–0–1	Paladio Collins	TKO	5 (8)	5 Nov 1950	Arena de Colon, Colon City, Panama	
10	Win	9–0–1	Tolentino Diaz	PTS	8	1 Oct 1950	Gimnasio Nacional, Panama City, Panama	
9	Win	8–0–1	John Bill	KO	4 (6)	27 Aug 1950	Gimnasio Nacional, Panama City, Panama	
8	Win	7–0–1	Baby Garcia	PTS	6	2 Jul 1950	Estadio Olimpico, Panama City, Panama	
7	Win	6–0–1	Lupe Pancho	PTS	6	28 May 1950	Gimnasio Nacional, Panama City, Panama	
6	Win	5–0–1	Joe Armstrong	PTS	4	15 Jan 1950	Estadio Olimpico, Panama City, Panama	
5	Win	4–0–1	Paladio Collins	PTS	4	19 Sep 1948	Gimnasio Nacional, Panama City, Panama	
4	Win	3–0–1	Ray Ward	PTS	4	20 Jun 1948	Arena de Colon, Colon City, Panama	
3	Win	2–0–1	Harold Dade II	KO	2 (4)	18 Apr 1948	Arena de Colon, Colon City, Panama	
2	Win	1–0–1	Horacio Boyce	PTS	4	26 Oct 1947	Gimnasio Nacional, Panama City, Panama	
1	Draw	0–0–1	Wilfredo Brown	PTS	4	16 Mar 1947	Estadio Olimpico, Panama City, Panama	
