= Gene Fullmer =

American boxer (1931–2015)

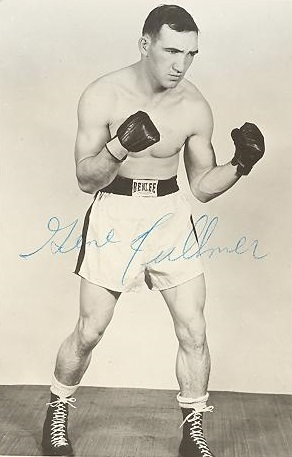

Personal information
- Nicknames: Cyclone; The "Mormon Mauler"
- Nationality: American
- Born: Lawrence Gene Fullmer; July 21, 1931 West Jordan, Utah, U.S.
- Died: April 27, 2015 (aged 83) West Jordan, Utah, U.S.
- Height: 5 ft 7 in (1.70 m)
- Weight: Middleweight

Boxing career
- Reach: 69 in (175 cm)
- Stance: Orthodox

Boxing record
- Total fights: 64
- Wins: 55
- Win by KO: 24
- Losses: 6
- Draws: 3

Lawrence Gene Fullmer (July 21, 1931 – April 27, 2015) was an American professional boxer and World Middleweight champion. He was known as The Utah Cyclone, The Mormon Mauler, and as "Cyclone" Gene Fullmer.

== Early life ==
Fullmer was born and raised in West Jordan, Utah. Due to his activity in the city, in 2015, the Gene Fullmer Recreation Center in West Jordan was named in his honor. Additionally, South Jordan and West Jordan renamed a five-block stretch of 9400 South after Fullmer.

== Professional career ==
Fullmer began his professional career in 1951 and won his first 29 fights, 19 by knockout. His manager during many years of his career was his mentor, Marv Jenson, who encouraged many youth in West Jordan, Utah, to enter boxing as amateurs.

=== Middleweight champion ===
Fullmer won the world middleweight championship on January 2, 1957, when he upset the legendary Sugar Ray Robinson by soundly winning a unanimous 15-round decision. On May 1, 1957, they fought a rematch. The fight began as expected, with Fullmer using his strength and awkwardness to bull into Robinson and really force him onto his heels. In the fifth round Robinson, while backing up, lashed out with what has been called the perfect left hook. It caught Fullmer flush on the chin and knocked him out.

In 1959, the National Boxing Association withdrew its recognition of Robinson as middleweight champion. Fullmer and fellow former middleweight champion Carmen Basilio fought for the vacant NBA title on August 28, 1959, and Fullmer won the crown when he TKOed Basilio in the 14th round. Meanwhile, Robinson was to lose his version of the middleweight championship to Paul Pender.

Fullmer and Pender never met to settle their claims to the middleweight title, and Pender eventually retired. Meanwhile, Fullmer fought and turned back the challenges of many top contenders, such as Basilio, Ellsworth "Spider" Webb, Florentino Fernández, and welterweight champion Benny "Kid" Paret. He narrowly escaped being dethroned when he was held to 15-round draws by Robinson and future titleholder Joey Giardello. The draw against Robinson was widely criticised by almost every ringside observer, who had Robinson winning 11–4 or 10–5 in rounds. In their final meeting, a title bout in 1961, Fullmer beat Robinson by unanimous decision.

=== Losing the title ===
Fullmer finally lost the middleweight title to Dick Tiger on October 23, 1962, in a unanimous decision. They fought a rematch on February 23, 1963, which resulted in a draw. Fullmer's attempts to regain the middleweight crown finally ended when he was TKOed in seven rounds by Tiger on August 10, 1963.

Fullmer's final record included 55 wins (24 by KO), 6 losses, and 3 draws.

== Professional boxing record ==
64 fights	55 wins	6 losses
By knockout	24	2
By decision	31	4
Draws	3	

No.	Result	Record	Opponent	Type	Round, time	Date	Location	Notes
64	Loss	55–6–3	Dick Tiger	RTD	7 (15), 3:00	Aug 10, 1963	Liberty Stadium, Ibadan, Nigeria	For WBA and The Ring middleweight titles; For inaugural WBC middleweight title
63	Draw	55–5–3	Dick Tiger	SD	15	Feb 23, 1963	Convention Center, Las Vegas, Nevada, U.S.	For WBA and NSYAC middleweight titles
62	Loss	55–5–2	Dick Tiger	UD	15	Oct 23, 1962	Candlestick Park, San Francisco, California, U.S.	Lost WBA middleweight title
61	Win	55–4–2	Benny Paret	KO	10 (15), 2:30	Dec 9, 1961	Convention Center, Las Vegas, Nevada, U.S.	Retained NBA middleweight title
60	Win	54–4–2	Florentino Fernández	SD	15	Aug 5, 1961	Ogden Stadium, Ogden, Utah, U.S.	Retained NBA middleweight title
59	Win	53–4–2	Sugar Ray Robinson	UD	15	Mar 4, 1961	Convention Center, Las Vegas, Nevada, U.S.	Retained NBA middleweight title
58	Draw	52–4–2	Sugar Ray Robinson	SD	15	Dec 3, 1960	Sports Arena, Los Angeles, California, U.S.	Retained NBA middleweight title
57	Win	52–4–1	Carmen Basilio	TKO	12 (15)	Jun 29, 1960	Derks Field, Salt Lake City, Utah, U.S.	Retained NBA middleweight title
56	Draw	51–4–1	Joey Giardello	SD	15	Apr 20, 1960	Montana St. College Fieldhouse, Bozeman, Montana, U.S.	Retained NBA middleweight title
55	Win	51–4	Ellsworth Webb	UD	15	Dec 4, 1959	George Nelson Field House, Logan, Utah, U.S.	Retained NBA middleweight title
54	Win	50–4	Carmen Basilio	TKO	14 (15), 0:39	Aug 28, 1959	Cow Palace, Daly City, California, U.S.	Won vacant NBA middleweight title
53	Win	49–4	Wilf Greaves	MD	10	Feb 20, 1959	Madison Square Garden, New York City, New York, U.S.	
52	Win	48–4	Milo Savage	UD	10	Jan 9, 1959	Freeman Coliseum, San Antonio, Texas, U.S.	
51	Win	47–4	Joe Miceli	KO	2 (10), 0:38	Nov 10, 1958	Fairgrounds Coliseum, Salt Lake City, Utah, U.S.	
50	Win	46–4	Ellsworth Webb	UD	10	Sep 11, 1958	Derks Field, Salt Lake City, Utah, U.S.	
49	Win	45–4	Jim Hegerle	UD	10	Jul 7, 1958	Arena, West Jordan, Utah, U.S.	
48	Win	44–4	Milo Savage	UD	10	Mar 3, 1958	Fairgrounds Coliseum, Salt Lake City, Utah, U.S.	
47	Win	43–4	Neal Rivers	MD	10	Nov 15, 1957	Madison Square Garden, New York City, New York, U.S.	
46	Win	42–4	Chico Vejar	UD	10	Sep 4, 1957	Arena, West Jordan, Utah, U.S.	
45	Win	41–4	Ralph 'Tiger' Jones	UD	10	Jun 7, 1957	Chicago Stadium, Chicago, Illinois, U.S.	
44	Loss	40–4	Sugar Ray Robinson	KO	5 (15), 1:27	May 1, 1957	Chicago Stadium, Chicago, Illinois, U.S.	Lost NYSAC, NBA, and The Ring middleweight titles
43	Win	40–3	Wilf Greaves	UD	10	Feb 18, 1957	City Auditorium, Denver, Colorado, U.S.	
42	Win	39–3	Wilf Greaves	UD	10	Jan 28, 1957	Fairgrounds Coliseum, Salt Lake City, Utah, U.S.	
41	Win	38–3	Sugar Ray Robinson	UD	15	Jan 2, 1957	Madison Square Garden, New York City, New York, U.S.	Won NYSAC, NBA, and The Ring middleweight titles
40	Win	37–3	Moses Ward	KO	3 (10)	Sep 22, 1956	Arena, West Jordan, Utah, U.S.	
39	Win	36–3	Charles Humez	UD	10	May 25, 1956	Madison Square Garden, New York City, New York, U.S.	
38	Win	35–3	Ralph 'Tiger' Jones	UD	10	Apr 20, 1956	Public Hall, Cleveland, Ohio, U.S.	
37	Win	34–3	Gil Turner	SD	10	Feb 17, 1956	Madison Square Garden, New York City, New York, U.S.	
36	Win	33–3	Rocky Castellani	SD	10	Jan 4, 1956	Cleveland Arena, Cleveland, Ohio, U.S.	
35	Loss	32–3	Eduardo Lausse	UD	10	Nov 25, 1955	Madison Square Garden, New York City, New York, U.S.	
34	Loss	32–2	Bobby Boyd	UD	10	Sep 28, 1955	Chicago Stadium, Chicago, Illinois, U.S.	
33	Win	32–1	Al Andrews	UD	10	Sep 12, 1955	Ogden Stadium, Ogden, Utah, U.S.	
32	Win	31–1	Del Flanagan	UD	10	Jul 26, 1955	Civic Center, Butte, Montana, U.S.	
31	Win	30–1	Gil Turner	PTS	10	Jun 20, 1955	West Jordan Park, West Jordan, Utah, U.S.	
30	Loss	29–1	Gil Turner	UD	10	Apr 4, 1955	Eastern Parkway Arena, New York City, New York, U.S.	
29	Win	29–0	Govan Small	UD	10	Mar 21, 1955	Fairgrounds Coliseum, Salt Lake City, Utah, U.S.	
28	Win	28–0	Paul Pender	UD	10	Feb 14, 1955	Eastern Parkway Arena, New York City, New York, U.S.	
27	Win	27–0	Marcel Assire	UD	10	Jan 31, 1955	Eastern Parkway Arena, New York City, New York, U.S.	
26	Win	26–0	Peter Müller	UD	10	Nov 15, 1954	Eastern Parkway Arena, New York City, New York, U.S.	
25	Win	25–0	Jackie LaBua	UD	10	Nov 8, 1954	Eastern Parkway Arena, New York City, New York, U.S.	
24	Win	24–0	Dick Wolfe	KO	4 (10), 1:27	Aug 16, 1954	West Jordan Park, West Jordan, Utah, U.S.	
23	Win	23–0	Reno Abellira	UD	10	Jul 29, 1954	Arena, West Jordan, Utah, U.S.	
22	Win	22–0	Govan Small	PTS	10	Jul 12, 1954	West Jordan, Utah, U.S.	
21	Win	21–0	Rio Rico	TKO	1 (10)	Jun 5, 1954	Fairgrounds Coliseum, Salt Lake City, Utah, U.S.	
20	Win	20–0	Andy Anderson	RTD	7 (10), 3:00	May 17, 1954	Fairgrounds Coliseum, Salt Lake City, Utah, U.S.	
19	Win	19–0	Charley Cato	KO	1 (10), 1:43	Apr 26, 1954	Fairgrounds Coliseum, Salt Lake City, Utah, U.S.	
18	Win	18–0	Kid Leon	KO	1 (10)	Feb 6, 1954	West Jordan Junior High, West Jordan, Utah, U.S.	
17	Win	17–0	Armando Cotero	UD	6	Sep 20, 1952	Legion Stadium, Hollywood, California, U.S.	
16	Win	16–0	Mickey Rhodes	KO	6 (?)	Aug 8, 1952	Ogden Stadium, Ogden, Utah, U.S.	
15	Win	15–0	Baby Ray	KO	1 (?)	Oct 17, 1951	Vernal, Utah, U.S.	
14	Win	14–0	Rudy Zadell	PTS	6	Oct 10, 1951	Forbes Field, Pittsburgh, Pennsylvania, U.S.	
13	Win	13–0	Gary Hanley	KO	1 (?)	Oct 3, 1951	West Jordan, Utah, U.S.	
12	Win	12–0	Garth Panther	MD	10	Sep 25, 1951	Fairgrounds Coliseum, Salt Lake City, Utah, U.S.	
11	Win	11–0	Sam Healy	TKO	4 (6)	Sep 14, 1951	Uintah High School Gym, Vernal, Utah, U.S.	
10	Win	10–0	Charley Cato	KO	4 (10)	Sep 7, 1951	West Jordan, Utah, U.S.	
9	Win	9–0	Buddy Sloan	KO	2 (?)	Aug 25, 1951	Hurricane, Utah, U.S.	
8	Win	8–0	Sam Healy	KO	1 (?)	Aug 24, 1951	Hurricane, Utah, U.S.	
7	Win	7–0	Carlos Martinez	TKO	1 (4)	Aug 1, 1951	Cow Palace, Daly City, California, U.S.	
6	Win	6–0	Lamar Peterson	KO	1 (?)	Jul 16, 1951	West Jordan, Utah, U.S.	
5	Win	5–0	Eddie Duffy	KO	2 (4)	Jul 9, 1951	Fairgrounds Coliseum, Salt Lake City, Utah, U.S.	
4	Win	4–0	Eddie Duffy	KO	1 (?)	Jul 2, 1951	Vernal, Utah, U.S.	
3	Win	3–0	Gary Carr	KO	3 (?)	Jun 23, 1951	Midvale, Utah, U.S.	
2	Win	2–0	Andy Jackson	KO	1 (?)	Jun 16, 1951	West Jordan, Utah, U.S.	
1	Win	1–0	Glen Peck	KO	1 (4), 1:52	Jun 9, 1951	George Nelson Fieldhouse, Logan, Utah, U.S.	

== Titles in boxing ==
=== Major world titles ===
- NYSAC middleweight champion (160 lbs)
- NBA (WBA) middleweight champion (160 lbs) (2×)

=== The Ring magazine titles ===
- The Ring middleweight champion (160 lbs)

=== Undisputed titles ===
- Undisputed middleweight champion

== Fighting style ==
Fullmer was known as an aggressive brawler and relentless pressure fighter. He used wide hooks and overhands, but he is most known for his heavy use of the reverse cross-arm guard. This caused Fullmer to have an awkward, but effective jab which he used to set up power punches.

== Personal life ==
Fullmer graduated from Jordan High School and worked at Kennecott Copper Mine for several years, he also served in the Korean War. He married Dolores Holt on October 13, 1955, in the Salt Lake Temple. They raised 2 daughters and 2 sons.

Fullmer had two younger brothers who boxed: Don Fullmer (February 21, 1939 - January 28, 2012), who twice challenged for the World Middleweight Title, and Jay Fullmer (March 9, 1937 - April 22, 2015), who boxed as a lightweight.

Fullmer was a member of the Church of Jesus Christ of Latter-day Saints (LDS Church), and his living the tenets of his religion, especially the Word of Wisdom, was heavily covered in the press. It was also frequently mentioned that he was a father and that he paid tithing on his boxing winnings.

Fullmer appeared in a cameo role in the 1968 film The Devil's Brigade as a Montana bartender.

Fullmer is featured on the cover of the album Greatest Hits by Alice in Chains.

On January 21, 1962, Fullmer appeared on What's My Line? but not as a mystery guest. His line was that he was a mink rancher.

His fight with Dick Tiger appears prominently in the music video for the Iggy Pop song 'American Valhalla'.

On April 27, 2015, five days after younger brother Jay's death, Gene died at the age of 83 in his home surrounded by friends and family.

== Filmography ==
- The Devil's Brigade (1968) - The Bartender

== See also ==
- List of middleweight boxing champions

Achievements
Preceded by Sugar Ray Robinson	World Middleweight Champion; 2 January 1957– 1 May 1957	Succeeded by Sugar Ray Robinson
Preceded by Sugar Ray Robinson; Stripped	NBA World Middleweight Champion; Later WBA Title; 28 August 1959– 23 October 1962	Succeeded by Dick Tiger
