= José María Gatica =

Argentine boxer (1925–1963)

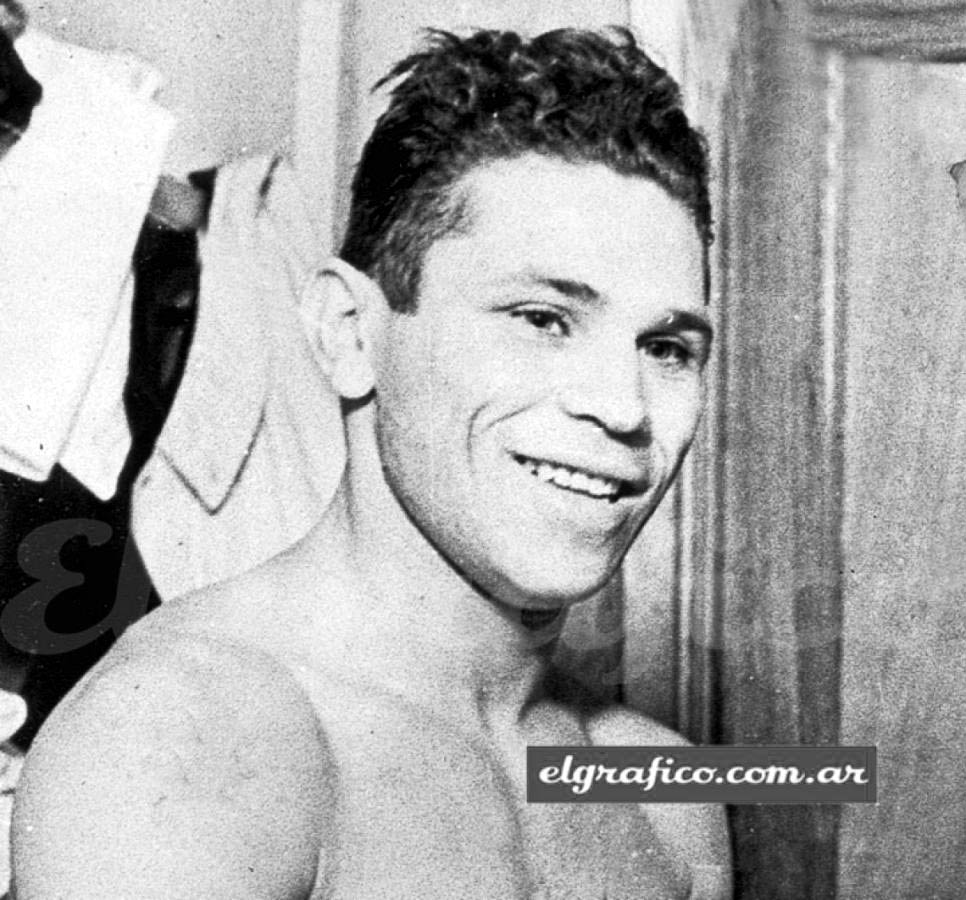

Personal information
- Nickname: Mono
- Nationality: Argentine
- Born: José María Gatica; 25 May 1925 Villa Mercedes, San Luis
- Died: November 12, 1963 (aged 38) Avellaneda, Buenos Aires
- Weight: Lightweight

Boxing career
- Stance: Orthodox

Boxing record
- Total fights: 96
- Wins: 86
- Win by KO: 72
- Losses: 7
- Draws: 2

José María Gatica (25 May 1925 – 12 November 1963) was an Argentine boxer, one of Argentina's most famous sports idols. Gatica fought 96 times, winning 86 (72 by KO).

However, Gatica's boxing career was surrounded in controversy due to his support of Argentine President Juan Domingo Perón. He was portrayed in the biopic Gatica, el mono, directed by Leonardo Favio in 1993.

== Biography ==
José María Gatica was born in Villa Mercedes, San Luis, Argentina. His parents were workers and decided to move to Buenos Aires, when Gatica was 7 years old. At the age of 10, Gatica was shining shoes on the streets of Constitución Station in the Federal Capital.

Gatica's childhood was a "savage" one. He never attended school, and never learned to read or write. His family lived in extreme poverty. The streets were his education and he became good with his fists.

He began his fistic career in unsanctioned fights at the Sailor's Home, where naval men bet on these fights. It was there he was discovered by Lázaro Koczil. Gatica had a wild, free swinging ring style. He came out at the bell throwing non-stop looping punches. His first ring nickname was "The Tiger". Fighting for the Central Club Cabins, Gatica won the Argentine Golden Gloves and decided to embark on a professional career.

Gatica was trained by Nicholas Preziosa and turned pro at the famed Luna Park in Argentina. His exciting style soon caught on to the general public, and José María Gatica became the biggest sports idol in Argentina. New Argentine President Juan Domingo Perón and his wife Evita became his number one fans. Upon meeting Perón for the first time, Gatica commented, " General... Two powers are greeted." Gatica became a vocal supporter of President Peron and his government.

Gatica was married twice during this time. His first wife was Ema Fernández and they had a daughter, María Eva, named after Argentina's First Lady, Evita Perón. His second wife was Ema "Nora" Guercio, and she and Gatica enjoyed a luxurious lifestyle of fine dining, expensive clothing, sportscars, expensive jewels, and rubbing elbows with the elite of Argentina.

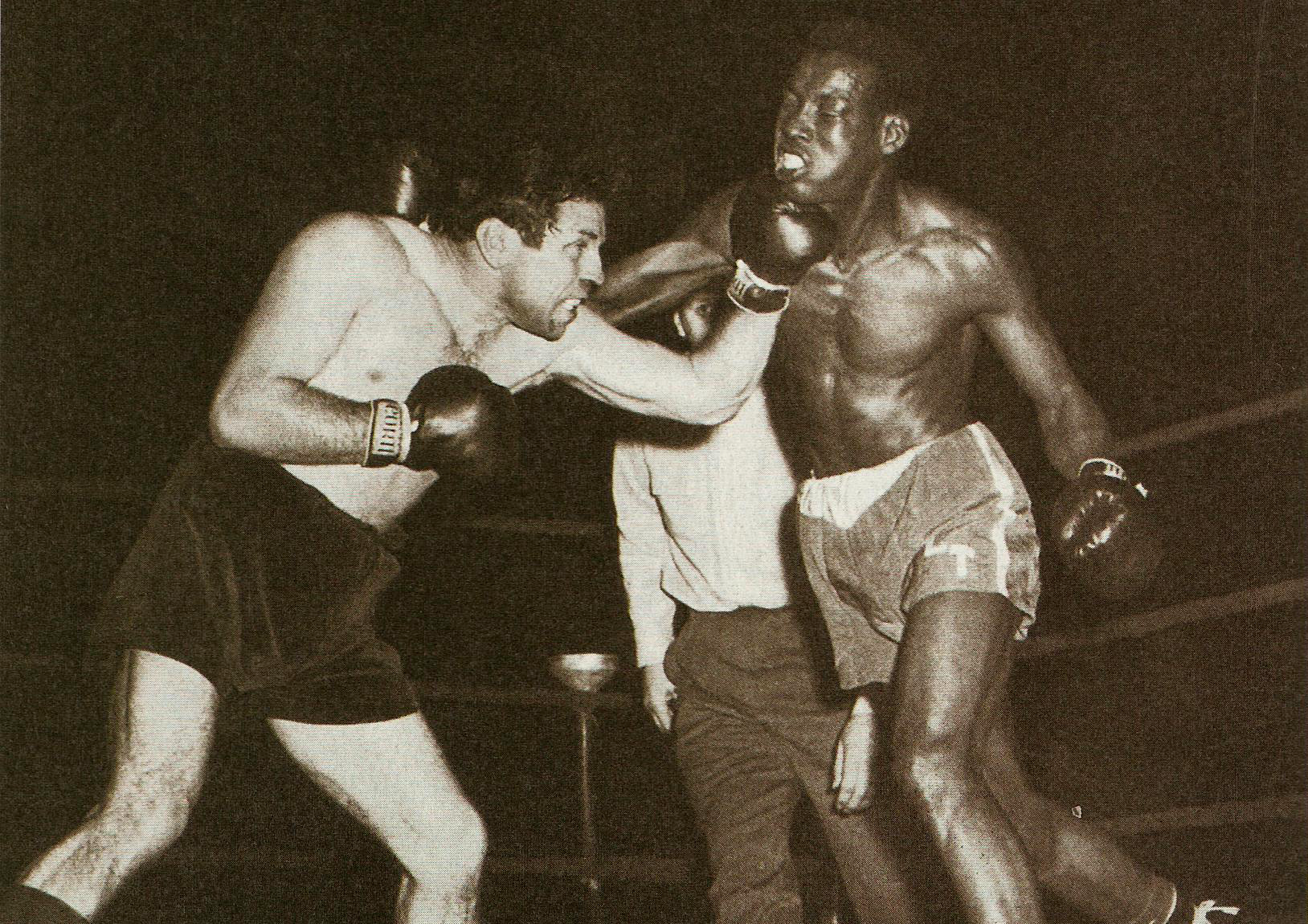
Gatica during his fight vs. Luis Federico Thompson (1952)

Gatica's dreams of a world title were crushed when he fought world champion Ike Williams in a non-title bout in the United States. Gatica's wild ring style was a failure against Williams, and he suffered a 1st round knockout loss. However, the loss had no effect on Gatica's popularity in Argentina. Called "El Mono" by his thousands of fans, Gatica returned to Argentina to fight a series of exciting brawls with his Argentinian arch-rival Alfredo Prada. Their series of action-packed fights were dubbed, "The Graziano-Zale Fights Argentine Style." 25,000 fans attended their last fight.

However, with the fall of President Juan Perón, Gatica went from his country's most-loved sports idol, to its most hated. After dedicating a victory to the exiled Perón on the radio, Gatica was arrested by the police. Gatica was forced to retire by the Federación Argentina de Boxeo due to his support of Perón, and his boxing license was revoked for life.

Gatica had given away thousands of dollars to friends and in tips. He had once been known for his flamboyant lifestyle, which included walking the streets with a lion cub, and wearing silk shirts and diamond rings, but he was now penniless. He was no longer received by Argentina's political and entertainment elite, and his fan base had diminished.

His second wife divorced him, and Gatica was forced to sell papers on the street. Now living in poverty, he married Rita Armellino and had daughters Viviana and Patricia. His old ring rival, Alfredo Prada, gave him a job as a host in his restaurant.

Gatica and his family lost everything in a flood, but the down-on-his-luck Gatica still managed a smile for his country's newspapers. He became a fixture near local sports halls, selling "knick-knacks".

At the age of 38, José María Gatica was killed in the District of Avellaneda, on Herrera Street, when he was run over by a bus as he was leaving the Club Atlético Independiente. As Gatica's life had begun in the streets, it ended in the streets as well.

Gatica is buried at Cementerio de la Chacarita in Buenos Aires, Argentina, plot: Panteón Casa de los Boxeadores, 1s 4 # 22. In Argentina a movie was made about his life in 1993, Gatica, El Mono. His hometown honored his memory by naming a sports auditorium after him.

== Bibliography ==
- Gatica, el boxeador de Evita y Perón (novel) by Enrique Medina – Galerna Ediciones, Buenos Aires, 1991
- Artistas, Locos y Criminales (novel) by Osvaldo Soriano – Seix Barral, 1984 – ISBN 9789507314391
- "The Reel Deal" by Todd Anthony on Miami New Times, February 2, 1994
