= Don Jordan =

American boxer (1934-1997)

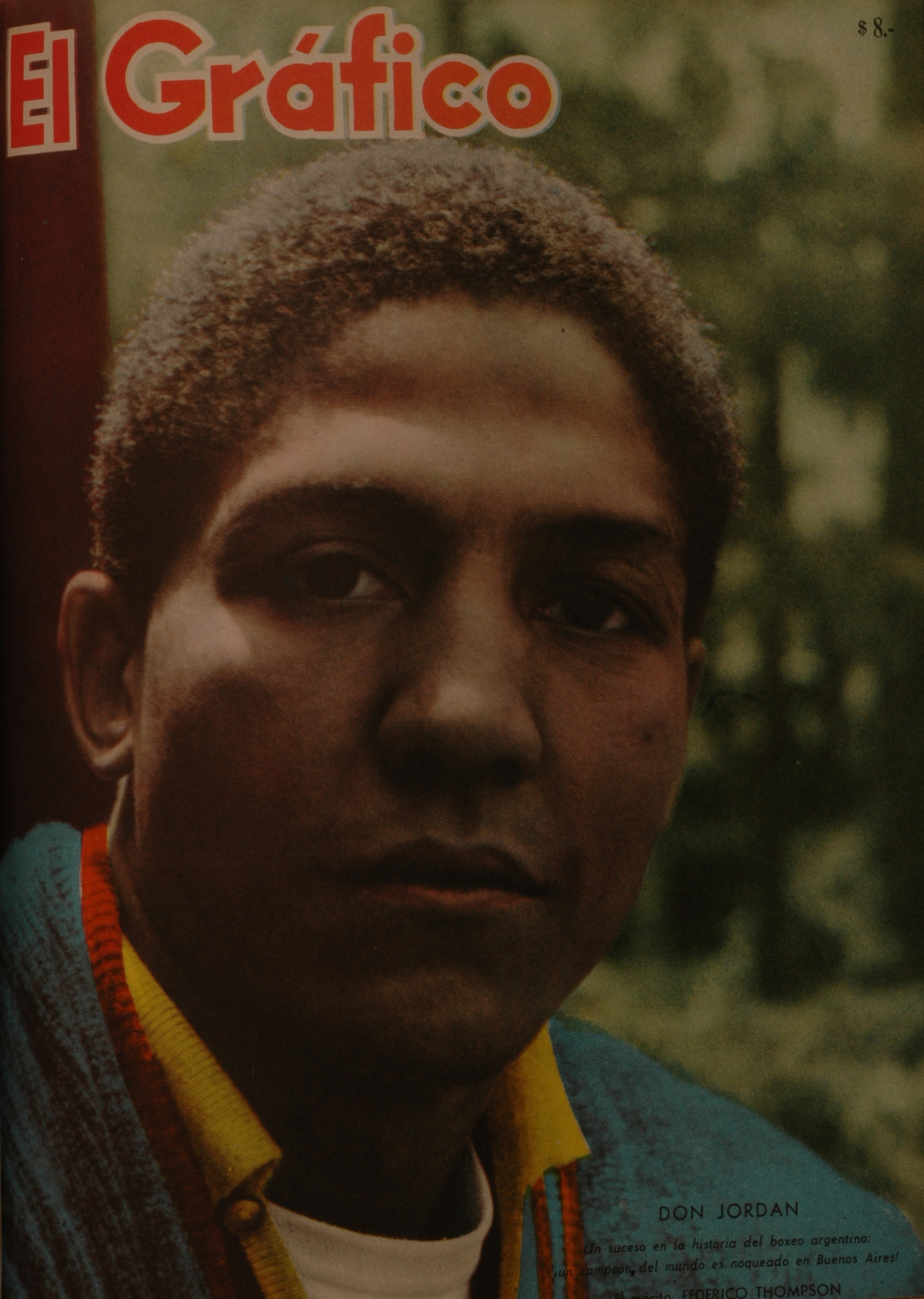

Personal information
- Nickname: Geronimo
- Born: June 22, 1934 Los Angeles, California, U.S.
- Died: February 13, 1997 (aged 62) San Pedro, California, U.S.

Boxing career

Boxing record
- Total fights: 76
- Wins: 51
- Win by KO: 17
- Losses: 23
- Draws: 1
- No contests: 1

Don Jordan (June 22, 1934 – February 13, 1997) was an American boxer born in Los Angeles, California and was the Undisputed Welterweight Champion of the World from 1958 to 1960. His nickname was ‘Geronimo’. He was of Mexican and African American descent.

== Career ==
Born 22 June 1934 in Los Angeles, Jordan’s brief spell as an amateur shows that he began boxing as a Middleweight and – unusually – worked his way down to Welterweight as a professional. His amateur career spanned just fifteen contests, of which he lost only one.

Jordan fought professionally for the first time in April, 1953. Standing 5 feet 9 inches and typically weighing around 147 lbs, Jordan was well-proportioned and quickly showed himself to be an effective performer, winning nine in a row before dropping a decision in March 1954, to a fighter he had out-pointed just two months previously. He beat Art Ramponi to pick up the California State Welterweight title in October of that year and opened his 1955 campaign with a victory over former World Lightweight Champion Lauro Salas. From that point on, Jordan would be mixing it with the best.

Jordan’s progress over the next three years – including two notable victories over Gaspar Ortega – were rewarded when he challenged Virgil Akins for the World Welterweight Championship on 5 December 1958, winning by unanimous decision. Akins – who disputed the decision – would suffer an identical reverse when he met Jordan in a championship return five months later. That was the first of Jordan’s two successful title defences (the second was against Denny Moyer on 10 July 1959), before losing the title to Benny Paret, eighteen months after being crowned.

Once he lost his title, Jordan also seemed to lose his way. The last years of his career saw him record more defeats than victories and he was effectively – if ignominiously – ‘retired’ by the man refereeing his October 1962 contest with Battling Torres. When Jordan refused to get up after a knockdown in the first, referee Jimmy Wilson ruled that Torres had not actually hit Jordan hard enough to put him down and the fight was declared a ‘no contest’. Subsequently, the California State Athletic Commission suspended Jordan indefinitely. In 1961 Lucchese crime family mobster Frankie Carbo, known as "the Czar of Boxing" was charged with extortion and conspiracy regarding Jordan, convicted and given a 25-year federal sentence. Others convicted were Louis Tom Dragna (conviction overturned), Truman Gibson, Joe Sica, and Frank "Blinky" Palermo.

== Death ==
After being robbed and seriously assaulted in a Los Angeles parking lot in September 1996, Don Jordan went into a coma, and died in a nursing home in San Pedro, California, on 13 February 1997.

== Professional boxing record ==
76 fights	51 wins	23 losses
By knockout	17	3
By decision	34	20
Draws	1	
No contests	1	

No.	Result	Record	Opponent	Type	Round	Date	Location	Notes
76	NC	51–22–1 (1)	Battling Torres	NC	1 (10)	Oct 5, 1962	Olympic Auditorium, Los Angeles, California, U.S.	Jordan refused to get up and fight following a knockdown which the referee felt came from a punch that wasn't hard enough to knock him down
75	Loss	51–23–1	Joey Limas	UD	10	Jul 26, 1962	Civic Auditorium, Albuquerque, New Mexico, U.S.	
74	Loss	51–22–1	Giancarlo Garbelli	PTS	10	Apr 27, 1962	Palazzetto dello Sport, Roma, Lazio, Italy	
73	Loss	51–21–1	Tony DeMarco	KO	2 (10)	Dec 19, 1961	Memorial Auditorium, Sacramento, California, U.S.	
72	Loss	51–20–1	Rodolfo Diaz	UD	10	Nov 14, 1961	Memorial Auditorium, Sacramento, California, U.S.	
71	Loss	51–19–1	Hilario Morales	TKO	7 (10)	Aug 15, 1961	Ciudad Juarez, Chihuahua, Mexico	
70	Loss	51–18–1	Benny Medina	UD	10	Aug 1, 1961	Kearney Bowl, Fresno, California, U.S.	
69	Loss	51–17–1	Carmen Basilio	UD	10	Mar 11, 1961	War Memorial Auditorium, Syracuse, New York, U.S.	
68	Loss	51–16–1	Ludwig Lightburn	PTS	10	Nov 26, 1960	Mexicali, Baja California, Mexico	
67	Draw	51–15–1	Alfredo Cota	PTS	10	Oct 16, 1960	Mexicali, Baja California, Mexico	
66	Win	51–15	Julian Valdez	MD	10	Aug 16, 1960	Hi Corbett Field, Tucson, Arizona, U.S.	
65	Win	50–15	Jesse Bogart	KO	1 (10)	Aug 6, 1960	Nogales, Sonora, Mexico	
64	Loss	49–15	Phil Moyer	UD	10	Jul 15, 1960	Auditorium, Portland, Oregon, U.S.	
63	Loss	49–14	Benny 'Kid' Paret	UD	15	May 27, 1960	Convention Center, Las Vegas, Nevada, U.S.	Lost NYSAC, NBA, and The Ring welterweight titles
62	Loss	49–13	Marvin 'Candy' McFarland	UD	10	May 16, 1960	Memorial Stadium, Baltimore, Maryland, U.S.	
61	Loss	49–12	Luis Federico Thompson	KO	4 (10)	Dec 12, 1959	Estadio Luna Park, Buenos Aires, Distrito Federal, Argentina	
60	Win	49–11	Fernando Barreto	PTS	10	Dec 5, 1959	Ginásio Estadual do Ibirapuera, Sao Paulo, Sao Paulo, Brazil	
59	Win	48–11	Denny Moyer	UD	15	Jul 10, 1959	Meadows Race Track, Portland, Oregon, U.S.	Retained NYSAC, NBA, and The Ring welterweight titles
58	Win	47–11	Virgil Akins	UD	15	Apr 24, 1959	Kiel Auditorium, Saint Louis, Missouri, U.S.	Retained NYSAC, NBA, and The Ring welterweight titles
57	Win	46–11	Alvaro Gutierrez	TKO	3 (10)	Jan 22, 1959	Olympic Auditorium, Los Angeles, California, U.S.	
56	Win	45–11	Virgil Akins	UD	15	Dec 5, 1958	Olympic Auditorium, Los Angeles, California, U.S.	Won NYSAC, NBA, and The Ring welterweight titles
55	Win	44–11	Gaspar Ortega	SD	12	Oct 22, 1958	Lafayette Hotel, Long Beach, California, U.S.	
54	Win	43–11	Gaspar Ortega	SD	10	Sep 17, 1958	Madison Square Garden, Manhattan, New York City, New York, U.S.	
53	Win	42–11	Lahouari Godih	UD	10	Aug 29, 1958	Madison Square Garden, Manhattan, New York City, New York, U.S.	
52	Win	41–11	Issac Logart	SD	10	Jul 2, 1958	Legion Stadium, Hollywood, California, U.S.	
51	Win	40–11	Alfredo Cota	PTS	10	May 18, 1958	Mexicali, Baja California, Mexico	
50	Win	39–11	Kid Centella	KO	2 (10)	May 5, 1958	Plaza de Toros, Tijuana, Baja California, Mexico	
49	Win	38–11	Francisco Echevarria	TKO	3 (10)	Apr 15, 1958	Mexicali, Baja California, Mexico	
48	Win	37–11	Karl Heinz Guder	SD	10	Feb 15, 1958	Legion Stadium, Hollywood, California, U.S.	
47	Loss	36–11	Dave Charnley	PTS	10	Jan 28, 1958	Harringay Arena, Harringay, London, England, U.K.	
46	Win	36–10	Willie Morton	MD	10	Jan 4, 1958	Legion Stadium, Hollywood, California, U.S.	
45	Win	35–10	Ray Portilla	TKO	6 (10)	Nov 29, 1957	Coliseum, San Diego, California, U.S.	
44	Win	34–10	Orlando Zulueta	UD	10	Oct 12, 1957	Legion Stadium, Hollywood, California, U.S.	
43	Win	33–10	Juan Padilla	UD	10	Aug 12, 1957	Tijuana, Baja California, Mexico	
42	Win	32–10	Alfredo Cota	KO	1 (10)	Jul 23, 1957	Tijuana, Baja California, Mexico	
41	Win	31–10	Arnoldo Gil	KO	2 (10)	Jul 15, 1957	Plaza de Toros, Tijuana, Baja California, Mexico	
40	Loss	30–10	LC Morgan	UD	10	Jun 15, 1957	Legion Stadium, Hollywood, California, U.S.	
39	Win	30–9	Jesse Bogart	KO	1 (10)	May 11, 1957	Legion Stadium, Hollywood, California, U.S.	
38	Win	29–9	Ezequiel Uribe	PTS	10	Mar 19, 1957	Mexico City, Distrito Federal, Mexico	
37	Loss	28–9	Charley Tombstone Smith	UD	12	Jan 24, 1957	Olympic Auditorium, Los Angeles, California, U.S.	
36	Loss	28–8	Al Nevarez	PTS	10	Jan 1, 1957	Mexicali, Baja California, Mexico	
35	Win	28–7	Archie Whitewater	UD	10	Dec 27, 1956	Olympic Auditorium, Los Angeles, California, U.S.	
34	Win	27–7	Enrique Esqueda	KO	1 (10)	Nov 18, 1956	Mexicali, Baja California, Mexico	
33	Loss	26–7	Orlando Zulueta	MD	10	Oct 16, 1956	Olympic Auditorium, Los Angeles, California, U.S.	
32	Win	26–6	Frankie Skidmore	TKO	7 (10)	Jun 28, 1956	Olympic Auditorium, Los Angeles, California, U.S.	
31	Win	25–6	Timmie Jefferson	UD	10	Jun 7, 1956	Olympic Auditorium, Los Angeles, California, U.S.	
30	Loss	24–6	Joey Lopes	SD	12	May 5, 1956	Olympic Auditorium, Los Angeles, California, U.S.	
29	Loss	24–5	Jimmy Carter	UD	10	Mar 29, 1956	Olympic Auditorium, Los Angeles, California, U.S.	
28	Win	24–4	Paddy DeMarco	TKO	5 (10)	Feb 2, 1956	Olympic Auditorium, Los Angeles, California, U.S.	
27	Loss	23–4	Art Aragon	UD	10	Dec 15, 1955	Olympic Auditorium, Los Angeles, California, U.S.	
26	Win	23–3	Woody Winslow	UD	10	Oct 20, 1955	Winterland Arena, San Francisco, California, U.S.	
25	Win	22–3	Woody Winslow	UD	10	Sep 3, 1955	Legion Stadium, Hollywood, California, U.S.	
24	Win	21–3	Joe Miceli	UD	10	Aug 18, 1955	Olympic Auditorium, Los Angeles, California, U.S.	
23	Loss	20–3	Art Aragon	UD	10	Jun 2, 1955	Olympic Auditorium, Los Angeles, California, U.S.	
22	Win	20–2	Lauro Salas	SD	12	Mar 31, 1955	Olympic Auditorium, Los Angeles, California, U.S.	
21	Win	19–2	Frankie Cockrell	UD	10	Mar 3, 1955	Olympic Auditorium, Los Angeles, California, U.S.	
20	Win	18–2	Gaby Macias	UD	10	Feb 15, 1955	Memorial Auditorium, Sacramento, California, U.S.	
19	Win	17–2	Lauro Salas	UD	12	Jan 13, 1955	Olympic Auditorium, Los Angeles, California, U.S.	
18	Win	16–2	Manny Renteria	KO	7 (12)	Nov 29, 1954	Olympic Auditorium, Los Angeles, California, U.S.	
17	Win	15–2	Art Ramponi	UD	12	Oct 4, 1954	Olympic Auditorium, Los Angeles, California, U.S.	
16	Win	14–2	Billy Hartman	TKO	4 (10)	Sep 20, 1954	Olympic Auditorium, Los Angeles, California, U.S.	
15	Win	13–2	Art Ramponi	UD	10	Aug 30, 1954	Olympic Auditorium, Los Angeles, California, U.S.	
14	Win	12–2	Freddie Herman	SD	10	Jun 28, 1954	Olympic Auditorium, Los Angeles, California, U.S.	
13	Loss	11–2	Dickie Wong	UD	10	May 31, 1954	Olympic Auditorium, Los Angeles, California, U.S.	
12	Win	11–1	Manuel Montes	TKO	2 (10)	Apr 17, 1954	Legion Stadium, Hollywood, California, U.S.	
11	Loss	10–1	Andy Escobar	UD	10	Mar 20, 1954	Legion Stadium, Hollywood, California, U.S.	
10	Win	10–0	Raul Esqueda	PTS	10	Feb 1, 1954	Mexicali, Baja California, Mexico	Date uncertain
9	Win	9–0	Andy Escobar	UD	10	Jan 16, 1954	Legion Stadium, Hollywood, California, U.S.	
8	Win	8–0	David Cervantes	UD	6	Dec 16, 1953	Legion Stadium, Hollywood, California, U.S.	
7	Win	7–0	Marvin Smith	TKO	5 (6)	Nov 7, 1953	Legion Stadium, Hollywood, California, U.S.	
6	Win	6–0	Marvin Smith	TKO	5 (6)	Oct 17, 1953	Legion Stadium, Hollywood, California, U.S.	
5	Win	5–0	Gaby Macias	TKO	5 (6)	Sep 26, 1953	Legion Stadium, Hollywood, California, U.S.	
4	Win	4–0	Chi Chi Martinez	PTS	4	Aug 8, 1953	Legion Stadium, Hollywood, California, U.S.	
3	Win	3–0	Chi Chi Martinez	UD	6	Jul 4, 1953	Legion Stadium, Hollywood, California, U.S.	
2	Win	2–0	Al Barbero	PTS	4	May 18, 1953	Arena, South Gate, California, U.S.	
1	Win	1–0	Ray Serna	PTS	4	Apr 27, 1953	Arena, South Gate, California, U.S.	

== Titles in boxing ==
=== Major world titles ===
- NYSAC welterweight champion (147 lbs)
- NBA (WBA) welterweight champion (147 lbs)

=== The Ring magazine titles ===
- The Ring welterweight champion (147 lbs)

=== Undisputed titles ===
- Undisputed welterweight champion

== See also ==
- List of welterweight boxing champions

Sporting positions
Preceded by Virgil Akins	World Welterweight Champion; 5 Dec 1958 – 27 May 1960	Succeeded by Benny (Kid) Paret

== Sources ==
1. Biographical information: (i) The Ring Record Book & Boxing Encyclopedia 1959 (Nat Fleischer, The Ring Book Shop Inc., 1959). See p. 8 for a very brief cameo. (ii) WBA Online , offers confirmation of the date and manner of Jordan’s death.

2. Ring Record: (i) The Cyber Boxing Zone . This source misses Jordan’s first defence of the Welterweight Championship, taking place 24 April 1959. (ii) The Boxing Records Archive . This source also provides information about the manner of the end of Jordan's career. (iii) The Ring Record Book & Boxing Encyclopedia 1959 (Nat Fleischer, The Ring Book Shop Inc., 1959), P.276.

Sporting positions
World boxing titles
Preceded by Virgil Akins	NYSAC welterweight champion December 5, 1958 – May 27, 1960	Succeeded by Benny Paret
Preceded by Virgil Akins	NBA welterweight champion December 5, 1958 – May 27, 1960	Succeeded by Benny Paret
Preceded by Virgil Akins	The Ring welterweight champion December 5, 1958 – May 27, 1960	Succeeded by Benny Paret
Preceded by Virgil Akins	Undisputed welterweight champion December 5, 1958 – May 27, 1960	Succeeded by Benny Paret
