= Denny Moyer =

American boxer

Personal information
- Born: August 8, 1939 Portland, Oregon, US
- Died: June 30, 2010 (aged 70) Portland, Oregon, US
- Height: 5 ft 8 in (1.73 m)
- Weight: Light middleweight

Boxing career
- Reach: 72 in (183 cm)
- Stance: Orthodox

Boxing record
- Total fights: 141
- Wins: 98
- Win by KO: 25
- Losses: 38
- Draws: 4
- No contests: 1

Denny Moyer (August 8, 1939 – June 30, 2010) was an American professional boxer who held the world light middleweight title between 1962 and 1963. He finished his career with a 98–38–4 record.

== Early life ==
Moyer was born in Portland, Oregon, and attended Central Catholic High School. He was the younger brother of Phil Moyer, another Portland boxer. Both Denny and Phil had been trained as amateur boxers by their uncle, Tommy Moyer, who had been a national AAU boxing champion.

== Early professional career ==
Moyer fought Don Jordan for the world welterweight title on July 7, 1959, after just 21 professional bouts, in his home town of Portland. Moyer was outpointed, making the world title shot his first defeat. He continued to box in the best company for two years, and then won the vacant World light-middleweight title by gaining a points win over Joey Giambra. After one successful defense, he lost the title to Ralph Dupas on points.

== Sugar Ray Robinson bouts ==
Denny Moyer, Phil Moyer, as well as Tommy Moyer each Boxed Sugar Ray Robinson in their boxing careers. Tommy Moyer lost to Sugar Ray in New York as an amateur. Denny Moyer fought Sugar Ray in New York twice as a pro, losing the first fight on points but winning the second by 7-3 scores on all three cards. Phil Moyer's bout with Robinson took place in Woodland Hills, California, outpointing Sugar Ray to result in the family collectively holding a 2 - 2 record the Boxer.

== Later career ==
Moyer became a middleweight and in 1970 won the American middleweight title by out pointing Eddie Pace. He lost and regained this title, then challenged Carlos Monzón for the world crown in Rome, but was stopped in five rounds. Moyer continued to fight for another three years before retiring in 1975.

== After boxing ==
After his boxing career, Moyer worked in real estate and owned a construction company. The website, Eastside Boxing reported in February 2004, that Moyer was in a Portland nursing home. Moyer died of complications from dementia pugilistica on June 30, 2010.

== Amateur and professional achievements ==
- 1956 Runner-up National AAU Welterweight Championships
- 1957 National AAU Welterweight Champion
- 1963 Jr. Middleweight Champion of the World
- 1971 Las Vegas Boxer of the Year
- 1983 Oregon Sports Hall of Fame
- 2001 World Boxing Hall of Fame

== Professional boxing record ==
141 fights	98 wins	38 losses
By knockout	25	7
By decision	73	31
Draws	4	
No contests	1	

No.	Result	Record	Opponent	Type	Round	Date	Location	Notes
141	Loss	98–38–4 (1)	Franz Csandl	PTS	10	Mar 18, 1975	Stadthalle, Vienna, Austria	
140	Loss	98–37–4 (1)	Rafael Rodriguez	UD	10	Feb 3, 1975	Auditorium, Minneapolis, Minnesota, U.S.	
139	Win	98–36–4 (1)	Rocky DiFazio	TKO	10 (10)	Dec 11, 1974	International Amphitheatre, Chicago, Illinois, U.S	
138	Loss	97–36–4 (1)	Poul Knudsen	PTS	10	Nov 21, 1974	K.B. Hallen, Copenhagen, Denmark	
137	Win	97–35–4 (1)	Vicente Medina	UD	10	Oct 25, 1974	Coliseum, San Diego, California, U.S.	
136	Loss	96–35–4 (1)	Vito Antuofermo	UD	10	Sep 9, 1974	Madison Square Garden, Manhattan, New York City, New York, U.S.	
135	Win	96–34–4 (1)	Rudy Cruz	MD	10	Aug 16, 1974	Sports Arena, Portland, Oregon, U.S.	
134	Win	95–34–4 (1)	Vicente Medina	UD	10	Jun 28, 1974	Coliseum, San Diego, California, U.S.	
133	Win	94–34–4 (1)	Mike Lankester	KO	10 (10)	Jun 13, 1974	Multnomah County Expo Center, Portland, Oregon, U.S.	
132	Loss	93–34–4 (1)	Battling La'avasia	UD	10	May 29, 1974	Town Hall, Auckland, New Zealand	
131	Win	93–33–4 (1)	Jean Mateo	UD	10	Apr 18, 1974	Multnomah County Expo Center, Portland, Oregon, U.S.	
130	Loss	92–33–4 (1)	Renato Garcia	SD	10	Mar 29, 1974	Coliseum, San Diego, California, U.S.	
129	Loss	92–32–4 (1)	Eckhard Dagge	PTS	10	Feb 20, 1974	Deutschlandhalle, Charlottenburg, West Berlin, West Germany	
128	Loss	92–31–4 (1)	Fighting Mack	UD	10	Dec 14, 1973	Stadthalle, Vienna, Austria	
127	Loss	92–30–4 (1)	Melvin Dennis	SD	10	Oct 30, 1973	Municipal Auditorium, New Orleans, Louisiana, U.S.	
126	Loss	92–29–4 (1)	Tony Licata	UD	10	Oct 2, 1973	Municipal Auditorium, New Orleans, Louisiana, U.S.	
125	Win	92–28–4 (1)	Pat O'Connor	SD	10	Aug 24, 1973	Mayo Civic Auditorium, Rochester, New York, U.S.	
124	Loss	91–28–4 (1)	John L. Sullivan	SD	10	Jun 21, 1973	Lane County Fairgrounds, Eugene, Oregon, U.S.	
123	Win	91–27–4 (1)	Pat O'Connor	SD	10	Jun 7, 1973	Auditorium, Minneapolis, Minnesota, U.S.	
122	Loss	90–27–4 (1)	Manuel Fierro	UD	10	May 6, 1973	Gimnasio Municipal, San Luis Rio Colorado, Sonora, Mexico	
121	Win	90–26–4 (1)	Mario Marquez	UD	10	Mar 22, 1973	Memorial Auditorium, Sacramento, California, U.S.	
120	Win	89–26–4 (1)	George Davis	UD	10	Mar 7, 1973	Silver Slipper, Las Vegas, Nevada, U.S.	
119	Win	88–26–4 (1)	Walter Kelly	UD	10	Feb 21, 1973	Silver Slipper, Las Vegas, Nevada, U.S.	
118	Loss	87–26–4 (1)	Nojim Maiyegun	PTS	10	Jan 30, 1973	Stadthalle, Vienna, Austria	
117	Win	87–25–4 (1)	Chucho Garcia	UD	10	Dec 20, 1972	Silver Slipper, Las Vegas, Nevada, U.S.	
116	Loss	86–25–4 (1)	Art Hernandez	SD	12	Sep 6, 1972	Ice Arena, Des Moines, Iowa, U.S.	Lost NABF middleweight title
115	Win	86–24–4 (1)	Carlos Alberto Salinas	UD	12	Jul 26, 1972	Civic Auditorium, San Francisco, California, U.S.	Retained NABF middleweight title
114	Win	85–24–4 (1)	Art Davis	UD	10	Jul 5, 1972	Silver Slipper, Las Vegas, Nevada, U.S.	
113	Loss	84–24–4 (1)	Tony Mundine	TKO	7 (10)	May 31, 1972	Hordern Pavilion, Sydney, New South Wales, Australia	
112	Win	84–23–4 (1)	Carlos Alberto Salinas	MD	12	May 11, 1972	Memorial Auditorium, Sacramento, California, U.S.	Retained NABF middleweight title
111	Loss	83–23–4 (1)	Carlos Monzón	TKO	5 (15)	Mar 4, 1972	Palazzetto dello Sport, Roma, Lazio, Italy	For WBA, WBC, and The Ring middleweight titles
110	Win	83–22–4 (1)	Gene Bryant	UD	12	Feb 15, 1972	Silver Slipper, Las Vegas, Nevada, U.S.	Retained NABF middleweight title
109	Win	82–22–4 (1)	Aristeo Chavarin	UD	10	Dec 15, 1971	Silver Slipper, Las Vegas, Nevada, U.S.	
108	NC	81–22–4 (1)	Eugene Hart	NC	6 (10)	Sep 21, 1971	Spectrum, Philadelphia, Pennsylvania, U.S.	Bout declared a no-contest after both boxers fell out of the ring
107	Win	81–22–4	Gene Bryant	UD	10	Sep 7, 1971	Sahara Tahoe Hotel, Stateline, Nevada, U.S.	
106	Win	80–22–4	Mike Pusateri	TKO	6 (10)	Jul 28, 1971	Silver Slipper, Las Vegas, Nevada, U.S.	
105	Win	79–22–4	José Roberto Chirino	UD	12	Jun 19, 1971	Sahara Tahoe Hotel, Las Vegas, Nevada, U.S.	Retained NABF middleweight title
104	Win	78–22–4	Dave Oropeza	TKO	6 (12)	Apr 21, 1971	Silver Slipper, Las Vegas, Nevada, U.S.	Retained NABF middleweight title
103	Win	77–22–4	Jimmy Lester	UD	12	Mar 30, 1971	Sahara Tahoe Hotel, Stateline, Nevada, U.S.	Retained NABF middleweight title
102	Win	76–22–4	Raul Soriano	UD	12	Mar 5, 1971	Sahara Tahoe Hotel, Stateline, Nevada, U.S.	Retained NABF middleweight title
101	Win	75–22–4	Art Hernandez	UD	12	Feb 10, 1971	Silver Slipper, Las Vegas, Nevada, U.S.	Won NABF middleweight title
100	Win	74–22–4	Raul Soriano	UD	10	Jan 1, 1971	Gimnasio Municipal, San Luis Rio Colorado, Sonora, Mexico	
99	Win	73–22–4	Orlando de la Fuentes	UD	10	Dec 16, 1970	Silver Slipper, Las Vegas, Nevada, U.S.	
98	Draw	72–22–4	Rafael Gutierrez	MD	12	Nov 4, 1970	Silver Slipper, Las Vegas, Nevada, U.S.	
97	Win	72–22–3	Jesse Armenta	RTD	4 (10)	Sep 30, 1970	Silver Slipper, Las Vegas, Nevada, U.S.	
96	Win	71–22–3	Mike Seyler	TKO	9 (10)	Aug 10, 1970	Lane County Fairgrounds, Eugene, Oregon, U.S.	Won vacant USA Oregon State middleweight title
95	Loss	70–22–3	Fraser Scott	TKO	8 (10)	Jul 9, 1970	Seattle Center Coliseum, Seattle, Washington, U.S.	
94	Loss	70–21–3	Nate Williams	TKO	9 (12)	Apr 29, 1970	Silver Slipper, Las Vegas, Nevada, U.S.	Lost NABF middleweight title
93	Win	70–20–3	Eddie Pace	UD	12	Feb 25, 1970	Silver Slipper, Las Vegas, Nevada, U.S.	Won inaugural NABF middleweight title
92	Win	69–20–3	Mike Pusateri	TKO	2 (10)	Jan 28, 1970	Silver Slipper, Las Vegas, Nevada, U.S.	
91	Win	68–20–3	Doug Huntley	MD	10	Jan 7, 1970	Silver Slipper, Las Vegas, Nevada, U.S.	
90	Win	67–20–3	Art Alderete	TKO	5 (10)	Dec 3, 1969	Silver Slipper, Las Vegas, Nevada, U.S.	
89	Win	66–20–3	Gerhard Piaskowy	PTS	10	Oct 17, 1969	Sportpalast, Schoeneberg, West Berlin, West Germany	
88	Win	65–20–3	Nathaniel Macias	TKO	9 (10)	Sep 18, 1969	Sports Arena, Portland, Oregon, U.S.	
87	Win	64–20–3	Henry Walker	KO	9 (10)	Sep 9, 1969	Valley Music Theatre, Woodland Hills, California, U.S.	
86	Win	63–20–3	Jose Luis Rodriguez	TKO	7 (10)	Aug 1, 1969	Coliseum, San Diego, California, U.S.	
85	Win	62–20–3	Rocky Hernandez	UD	10	Jul 9, 1969	Silver Slipper, Las Vegas, Nevada, U.S.	
84	Loss	61–20–3	Fraser Scott	TKO	2 (10)	Apr 30, 1969	Seattle Center Arena, Seattle, Washington, U.S.	
83	Win	61–19–3	Frank Niblett	UD	10	Mar 27, 1969	Sports Arena, Portland, Oregon, U.S.	
82	Win	60–19–3	Dave Reed	TKO	6 (10)	Feb 20, 1969	Sports Arena, Portland, Oregon, U.S.	
81	Win	59–19–3	Frank Niblett	UD	10	Feb 5, 1969	Silver Slipper, Las Vegas, Nevada, U.S.	
80	Win	58–19–3	Gene Bryant	UD	10	Dec 17, 1968	Sports Arena, Portland, Oregon, U.S.	
79	Win	57–19–3	Bob Harrington	MD	10	Nov 22, 1968	Arena Exhibition Hall, Saint Louis, Missouri, U.S.	
78	Win	56–19–3	Carl Moore	TKO	9 (10)	Oct 30, 1968	Silver Slipper, Las Vegas, Nevada, U.S.	
77	Win	55–19–3	Jorge Rosales	PTS	10	Oct 4, 1968	Nuevo Laredo, Tamaulipas, Mexico	
76	Win	54–19–3	Jesse Armenta	PTS	10	Aug 10, 1968	Hermosillo, Sonora, Mexico	
75	Win	53–19–3	Jesse Armenta	KO	7 (10)	Jul 22, 1968	Tijuana, Baja California, Mexico	
74	Win	52–19–3	Lonnie Harris	PTS	10	May 21, 1968	Circle Arts Theater, San Diego, California, U.S.	
73	Win	51–19–3	Gene Bryant	UD	10	Apr 17, 1968	Silver Slipper, Las Vegas, Nevada, U.S.	
72	Draw	50–19–3	Rafael Gutierrez	PTS	10	Apr 8, 1968	Plaza de Toros El Toreo, Tijuana, Baja California, Mexico	
71	Win	50–19–2	Eddie Coffey	TKO	6 (10)	Mar 6, 1968	Silver Slipper, Las Vegas, Nevada, U.S.	
70	Win	49–19–2	Rafael Gutierrez	TKO	4 (10)	Feb 18, 1968	Mexicali, Baja California, Mexico	
69	Win	48–19–2	Doug Huntley	UD	10	Jan 31, 1968	Silver Slipper, Las Vegas, Nevada, U.S.	
68	Win	47–19–2	Danny Perez	TKO	6 (10)	Jan 3, 1968	Silver Slipper, Las Vegas, Nevada, U.S.	
67	Win	46–19–2	Tony Montano	UD	10	Dec 5, 1967	Civic Auditorium, San Jose, California, U.S.	
66	Loss	45–19–2	Freddie Little	KO	4 (10)	Jan 3, 1966	Hacienda Hotel, Las Vegas, Nevada, U.S.	
65	Win	45–18–2	Johnny Brooks	PTS	10	Nov 29, 1965	Hacienda Hotel, Las Vegas, Nevada, U.S.	Won vacant North American junior middleweight title
64	Draw	44–18–2	Thell Torrence	PTS	10	Oct 14, 1965	Olympic Auditorium, Los Angeles, California, U.S.	
63	Win	44–18–1	Ferd Hernandez	UD	10	Aug 23, 1965	Hacienda Hotel, Las Vegas, Nevada, U.S.	
62	Win	43–18–1	Jimmy Lester	SD	10	Jul 28, 1965	Kezar Pavilion, San Francisco, California, U.S.	
61	Win	42–18–1	Ferd Hernandez	UD	10	Jun 15, 1965	Hacienda Hotel, Las Vegas, Nevada, U.S.	
60	Loss	41–18–1	Jimmy Lester	UD	10	Apr 2, 1965	Kezar Pavilion, San Francisco, California, U.S.	
59	Win	41–17–1	Hilario Morales	UD	10	Mar 19, 1965	Olympic Auditorium, Los Angeles, California, U.S.	
58	Win	40–17–1	Fred Roots	UD	10	Feb 23, 1965	Memorial Auditorium, Sacramento, California, U.S.	
57	Win	39–17–1	Rocky Montalvo	PTS	10	Feb 3, 1965	Kezar Pavilion, San Francisco, California, U.S.	
56	Loss	38–17–1	Gene Bryant	SD	10	Jan 5, 1965	Hacienda Hotel, Las Vegas, Nevada, U.S.	
55	Win	38–16–1	Memo Lopez	UD	10	Nov 25, 1964	Fairgrounds Arena, Boise, Idaho, U.S.	
54	Win	37–16–1	Hilario Morales	UD	10	Oct 12, 1964	Civic Center, Butte, Montana, U.S.	
53	Loss	36–16–1	Nino Benvenuti	PTS	10	Sep 18, 1964	Palazzetto dello Sport, Roma, Lazio, Italy	
52	Loss	36–15–1	Manuel Gonzalez	UD	10	Sep 1, 1964	Sam Houston Coliseum, Houston, Texas, U.S.	
51	Loss	36–14–1	Joe DeNucci	SD	10	Apr 13, 1964	Arena, Boston, Massachusetts, U.S.	
50	Loss	36–13–1	Stan Harrington	MD	10	Dec 17, 1963	Civic Auditorium, Honolulu, Hawaii, U.S.	
49	Win	36–12–1	Hurricane Kid	UD	10	Dec 3, 1963	Civic Auditorium, Honolulu, Hawaii, U.S.	
48	Draw	35–12–1	Memo Ayon	PTS	10	Oct 29, 1963	Civic Auditorium, San Jose, California, U.S.	
47	Loss	35–12	Luis Manuel Rodríguez	TKO	9 (10)	Aug 17, 1963	Convention Center, Miami Beach, Florida, U.S.	
46	Loss	35–11	Ralph Dupas	UD	15	Jun 17, 1963	Civic Center, Baltimore, Maryland, U.S.	For WBA and WBC junior middleweight titles
45	Loss	35–10	Ralph Dupas	SD	15	Apr 29, 1963	Municipal Auditorium, New Orleans, Louisiana, U.S.	Lost WBA and WBC junior middleweight titles
44	Win	35–9	Stan Harrington	UD	15	Feb 19, 1963	Civic Auditorium, Honolulu, Hawaii, U.S.	Retained WBA junior middleweight title; Won inaugural WBC junior middleweight title
43	Loss	34–9	Joey Archer	UD	10	Jan 5, 1963	Madison Square Garden, Manhattan, New York City, New York, U.S.	
42	Win	34–8	Gene Bryant	UD	10	Dec 12, 1962	Shrine Auditorium, Billings, Montana, U.S.	
41	Win	33–8	Joey Giambra	UD	15	Oct 20, 1962	Memorial Coliseum, Portland, Oregon, U.S.	Won inaugural WBA junior middleweight title
40	Loss	32–8	Emile Griffith	SD	10	Aug 18, 1962	Sports Arena, Tacoma, Washington, U.S.	
39	Win	32–7	Ted Wright	UD	10	Jul 7, 1962	Madison Square Garden, Manhattan, New York City, New York, U.S.	
38	Loss	31–7	Ted Wright	SD	10	Jun 9, 1962	Madison Square Garden, Manhattan, New York City, New York, U.S.	
37	Win	31–6	Sugar Ray Robinson	UD	10	Feb 17, 1962	Madison Square Garden, Manhattan, New York City, New York, U.S.	
36	Loss	30–6	Sugar Ray Robinson	UD	10	Oct 21, 1961	Madison Square Garden, Manhattan, New York City, New York, U.S.	
35	Win	30–5	Obdulio Nunez	UD	10	Sep 9, 1961	Memorial Coliseum, Portland, Oregon, U.S.	
34	Loss	29–5	Obdulio Nunez	MD	10	Jun 17, 1961	Madison Square Garden, Manhattan, New York City, New York, U.S.	
33	Win	29–4	Willie Jennings	TKO	2 (10)	May 19, 1961	Armory, Centralia, Washington, U.S.	
32	Loss	28–4	Jorge Fernandez	UD	10	Apr 8, 1961	St. Nicholas Arena, Manhattan, New York City, New York, U.S.	
31	Win	28–3	Charley Scott	UD	10	Feb 11, 1961	Madison Square Garden, Manhattan, New York City, New York, U.S.	
30	Win	27–3	Willie Morton	UD	10	Jan 31, 1961	Civic Auditorium, San Jose, California, U.S.	
29	Loss	26–3	Jorge Fernandez	UD	10	Oct 15, 1960	Madison Square Garden, Manhattan, New York City, New York, U.S.	
28	Win	26–2	Benny Paret	SD	10	Aug 16, 1960	Madison Square Garden, Manhattan, New York City, New York, U.S.	
27	Win	25–2	Emile Griffith	SD	10	Apr 26, 1960	Pacific Livestock Pavilion, Portland, Oregon, U.S.	
26	Loss	24–2	Emile Griffith	SD	10	Mar 11, 1960	Madison Square Garden, Manhattan, New York City, New York, U.S.	
25	Win	24–1	Tony DeMarco	TKO	2 (10)	Feb 10, 1960	Boston Garden, Boston, Massachusetts, U.S.	
24	Win	23–1	Pat Lowry	KO	3 (10)	Jan 19, 1960	Civic Auditorium, Seattle, Washington, U.S.	
23	Win	22–1	Virgil Akins	SD	10	Dec 10, 1959	Auditorium, Portland, Oregon, U.S.	
22	Win	21–1	Paddy DeMarco	TKO	10 (10)	Sep 3, 1959	Auditorium, Portland, Oregon, U.S.	
21	Loss	20–1	Don Jordan	UD	15	Jul 10, 1959	Meadows Race Track, Portland, Oregon, U.S.	For NYSAC, NBA, and The Ring welterweight titles
20	Win	20–0	Vince Martinez	UD	10	Feb 17, 1959	Centennial Exposition Pavilion, Portland, Oregon, U.S.	
19	Win	19–0	Gaspar Ortega	SD	10	Jan 2, 1959	Madison Square Garden, Manhattan, New York City, New York, U.S.	
18	Win	18–0	Tony Dupas	UD	10	Dec 11, 1958	Auditorium, Portland, Oregon, U.S.	
17	Win	17–0	Johnny Saxton	UD	10	Oct 21, 1958	Auditorium, Portland, Oregon, U.S.	
16	Win	16–0	Connie Citizen	PTS	10	Oct 2, 1958	Anchorage High School Gym, Anchorage, Alaska	
15	Win	15–0	Julian Valdez	UD	10	Sep 17, 1958	Armory, Portland, Oregon, U.S.	
14	Win	14–0	Chico Cirini	TKO	4 (10)	Aug 22, 1958	Memorial Gymnasium, Anaconda, Montana, U.S.	
13	Win	13–0	Al Andrews	UD	10	Jul 1, 1958	Auditorium, Portland, Oregon, U.S.	
12	Win	12–0	Jimmy Hays	UD	8	Apr 22, 1958	Coliseum, Spokane, Washington, U.S.	
11	Win	11–0	Al Barbero	TKO	3 (8)	Apr 9, 1958	Cow Palace, Daly City, California, U.S.	
10	Win	10–0	Howard Dixon	KO	4 (8)	Feb 25, 1958	Eagles Hall, Portland, Oregon, U.S.	
9	Win	9–0	Jimmy McCoy	PTS	8	Jan 28, 1958	Eagles Hall, Portland, Oregon, U.S.	
8	Win	8–0	Buddy McDonald	UD	10	Jan 16, 1958	Auditorium, Portland, Oregon, U.S.	
7	Win	7–0	Tommy Thomas	PTS	8	Dec 17, 1957	Eagles Hall, Portland, Oregon, U.S.	
6	Win	6–0	Marvin Marcus	TKO	2 (8)	Nov 26, 1957	Eagles Hall, Portland, Oregon, U.S.	
5	Win	5–0	Doug Garrett	PTS	8	Nov 13, 1957	Cow Palace, Daly City, California, U.S.	
4	Win	4–0	Russell Davis	PTS	8	Oct 22, 1957	Eagles Hall, Portland, Oregon, U.S.	
3	Win	3–0	John Medlock	PTS	8	Oct 8, 1957	Eagles Hall, Portland, Oregon, U.S.	
2	Win	2–0	Buddy Ford	PTS	8	Sep 17, 1957	Eagles Hall, Portland, Oregon, U.S.	
1	Win	1–0	Jimmy McCoy	PTS	4	Aug 17, 1957	Meadows Race Track, Portland, Oregon, U.S.	

== Titles in boxing ==
=== Major world titles ===
- WBA light middleweight champion (Note: Inaugural champion.) (154 lbs)
- WBC light middleweight champion (154 lbs)

=== Regional/International titles ===
- North American light middleweight champion (154 lbs)
- NABF middleweight champion (160 lbs) (2×)
- Oregon State middleweight champion (160 lbs)

=== Undisputed titles ===
- Undisputed light middleweight champion (Note: First ever undisputed light middleweight champion.)

== See also ==
- List of world light-middleweight boxing champions

== External lists ==
- Boxing record for Denny Moyer from BoxRec (registration required)
- Denny Moyer - CBZ Profile

Sporting positions
Amateur boxing titles
Previous: Frank Davis	U.S. light middleweight champion 1957,1958	Next: Wilbert McClure
World boxing titles
Inaugural champion	WBA Junior middleweight champion October 20, 1962 – April 29, 1963	Succeeded by Ralph Dupas
Inaugural champion	WBC Junior middleweight champion February 19, 1963 – April 29, 1963	Succeeded by Ralph Dupas
Inaugural champion	Undisputed Junior middleweight champion February 19, 1963 – April 29, 1963	Succeeded by Ralph Dupas
