= Jim Hegerle =

American boxer

Jim Hegerle (February 17, 1936 – June 26, 2007), also known as Jimmy Hegerle, was a light heavyweight professional boxer from Saint Paul, Minnesota.

== Professional career ==
Hegerle made his professional debut against Walter Quinn on June 8, 1954, recording a win by fifth-round knockout. His first lost came in only his third professional fight, against Al Alexander, the following March. The loss didn't deter Hegerle, in fact his early career was sprinkled with occasional losses and draws, but he continued to fight frequently, and by April 1956 Hegerle had compiled a record of 19–3–2. In May Hegerle faced his first notable opponent, Jimmy Martinez, whose record was 69–23–9. Martinez beat him on points, but in a rematch only two weeks later, Hegerle returned the favor. The following month Hegerle faced 7–1–1 Joe Schmolze, who would become his chief rival. The two would fight on June 21 (a TKO win for Hegerle) and on August 22 (a majority decision for Schmolze, then again on August 14, 1958 (a split decision win for Schmolze) and one last time on Saint Patrick's Day of 1959 (a fifth-round TKO win for Hegerle). Of the four meetings, the last two were for the Minnesota light heavyweight championship. Other notable boxers who Hegerle fought included Del Flanagan, Clarence Cook, Gene Fullmer, Neal Rivers, and Nino Benvenuti, all of whom beat Hegerle, and Dick Lane, whom Hegerle defeated. Hegerle retired from professional boxing with a record of 36–18–3 with 20 wins coming by knockout.
