= Florentino Fernández (boxer) =

Cuban boxer

Personal information
- Nickname: The Ox
- Born: Florentino Fernández; March 7, 1936 Santiago de Cuba, Cuba
- Died: January 28, 2013 (aged 76) Miami, Florida
- Height: 5 ft 10 in (1.78 m)
- Weight: Welterweight; Middleweight

Boxing career
- Stance: Orthodox

Boxing record
- Total fights: 67
- Wins: 50
- Win by KO: 43
- Losses: 16
- Draws: 1

Florentino "the Ox" Fernández (March 7, 1936 – January 28, 2013) was a Cuban middleweight who fought from 1956 to 1972. His overall record was 50 wins (43 by KO), 16 losses and two draws. In the Cuban community, he was known both as "3 Toneles" and as "El Barbaro del Knock Out."

== Professional career ==
Fernandez was born in Santiago de Cuba. he was a big left hook artist who racked up a series of victories which led to his title challenge against Gene Fullmer. The 25-year-old Fernandez lost a split decision to Fullmer for the middleweight title in Ogden, Utah on August 5, 1961. Referee Ken Shulsen scored the fight 145-142 Fullmer, judge Del Markham favored Fernandez 145-143, and judge Norman Jorgensen scored it 148-140.

Fernandez insisted on a rematch, but Ring Magazine writer Al Buck pointed to Fernandez's two fights with Rocky Kalingo as a reason why Fullmer would be foolish to fight Fernandez in Communist Cuba; "Fighting Fernandez in Cuba hardly would be an enjoyable experience except for another Cuban, a Russian, or a Red Chinese. A Fernandez-Yankee battle in Havana would be put in a military atmosphere and amid turmoil. It was recalled that one Rocky Kalingo knocked out Fernandez in one round in Caracas and then let the Cuban have a return fight in Havana. Kalingo knocked Fernandez down in the first and appeared to be headed for another victory. The mob wouldn't have it. Kalingo was threatened to the point at which he was scared into near-paralysis. He was stopped."

Fernandez never received his rematch, but did receive 20 percent of the $100,000.00 gate and $10,000.00 from the paid-t.v. money.

When Cuba outlawed professional boxing, Fernandez lived in exile from the communist government of Cuba, in Miami Beach, Florida, where he fought on television and on the fight cards promoted by Chris Dundee. In most cases Fernandez either knocked out his opponents, or was in turn KO'd himself.

=== Loss to Carter ===
Fernandez might be best remembered for his one-round knockout loss to Rubin "Hurricane" Carter, lasting only a few seconds in 1962.

Fernandez came back the following year to knock out undefeated, future world light-heavyweight champion José Torres in five rounds on May 26, 1963.

=== First Retirement and Comeback ===
After a knockout defeat to club-fighter Willie Tiger in 1967, Fernandez announced his retirement. He blamed his numerous knockout defeats on personal problems associated with the political situation in his native country of Cuba.

He was working as a dishwasher and busboy when he decided to launch a comeback as a light heavyweight. Fernandez "shocked the boxing world" by scoring upset knockouts over Florida Middleweight Champion Jimmy Williams and Jerry Evans. When Fernandez was on the verge of a title shot against light heavyweight king Bob Foster, Fernandez was stopped in the 10th round of a toe-to-toe slugfest with upstart Vernon McIntosh in 1972.

== Retirement ==
In the early 1980s, Fernandez briefly coached amateur boxers at the Elizabeth Virrick Gym in Coconut Grove, Florida

== Honors ==
In 2003, Fernandez made the Ring Magazine's list of 100 greatest punchers of all time.

== Death ==
Fernandez died January 28, 2013, in Miami, Florida, after suffering a heart attack.
