= Rudell Stitch =

American boxer

Personal information
- Nationality: American
- Born: January 7, 1933 Louisville, Kentucky
- Died: June 5, 1960 (aged 27) Louisville, Kentucky
- Weight: welterweight

Boxing career
- Stance: Orthodox

Boxing record
- Total fights: 34
- Wins: 27
- Win by KO: 13
- Losses: 7

Rudell Stitch (January 7, 1933 – June 5, 1960) was a professional boxer from Louisville, Kentucky. He was ranked second in the world as a welterweight and fought numerous contenders, including Isaac Logart, Yama Bahama, Chico Vejar, Gasper Ortega, Luis Manuel Rodríguez, Ralph Dupas, Holly Mims and Stan Harrington. Stitch died while trying to save a friend from drowning in the Ohio River.

== Early boxing career ==
Boxing as a lightweight and welterweight, Stitch won 45 of 57 amateur bouts. He won Kentucky state titles in 1951, 1952, 1953, 1955, and 1956. Stitch reached the semi-finals of the Chicago Golden Gloves and the finals of the National AAU Tournament in 1956.

With Bud Bruner as his manager and trainer, Stitch started his professional boxing career as a welterweight in 1956. He won his first three professional fights, then lost a four-round split decision to Art Glass. He followed his first pro loss with two knockout victories, then lost a six-round decision in a rematch with Art Glass. After two more wins, Stitch lost an eight-round split decision to middleweight Pedro Bradley.

To make ends meet, Stitch worked a full-time job at a meat packing plant while pursuing his boxing career. He had a wife, a daughter and five sons to support.

== Becoming a contender ==
After six consecutive wins, Stitch fought Isaac Logart, the second-ranked welterweight in the world. The fight took place at the Jefferson County Armory in Louisville on August 27, 1958. Stitch, who was unranked, defeated Logart by a ten-round unanimous decision. On October 6, 1958, they had a rematch at St. Nicholas Arena in New York City. Stitch entered the fight ranked tenth in the world at welterweight. Logart, an 11–5 favorite, was ranked fifth. It was a close battle all the way. Logart had a strong finish and won by a close ten-round unanimous decision.

On November 26, 1958, Stitch faced Yama Bahama, a veteran with fifty-two professional victories, at the Exposition Center in Louisville. Stitch, who was the betting underdog, defeated Bahama by a ten-round unanimous decision. On December 28, 1958, Stitch defeated middleweight Chico Vejar by a ten-round unanimous decision at the Jefferson County Armory in Louisville. He gave away 11½ pounds to Vejar, a winner of eighty-three professional fights.

Stitch's first fight with Gasper Ortega, which took place at Madison Square Garden in New York City on February 6, 1959, illustrated his character. In the third round, there was an accidental clash of heads. Stitch wasn't hurt, but Ortega was staggering around. Stitch backed away and let Ortega's head clear: he didn't believe in taking advantage of an opponent in such a situation. Ortega went on to win by a ten-round split decision, but Stitch's sportsmanship earned him much respect. On May 8, 1959, they had a rematch in Syracuse, New York, and Stitch won by a ten-round unanimous decision.

On the day of the Ortega rematch, Stitch was awarded a bronze medal by the Carnegie Hero Fund for rescuing a man from drowning in the Ohio River. On September 18, 1958, Joseph Schifcar, an Army Corps of Engineers worker, fell into the river and began to sink. Stitch, who was fishing below a dam, waded into the water and took hold of Schifcar. The current swept Stitch off his feet, but he maintained a strong hold on Schifcar. Stitch supported him at the surface as they drifted sixty-eight feet in water as much as six feet deep over submerged rocks. A young man then entered the water and aided Stitch in towing Schifcar to safety.

Stitch knocked out Rudy Sawyer in the first round on July 1, 1959, in Louisville. In his previous fight, Sawyer lost a ten-round unanimous decision to future World Welterweight Champion Benny Paret. The knockout loss to Stitch was the only time Sawyer was stopped in his entire career.

On August 26, 1959, Stitch faced future World Welterweight Champion Luis Manuel Rodriguez at the State Fairgrounds Coliseum in Louisville. Stitch was ranked second in the world at welterweight, while Rodriguez was ranked seventh. Rodriguez won by a ten-round split decision, advancing his record to 23–0.

In his next fight, Stitch, now ranked eighth in the world, fought Ralph Dupas at Freedom Hall in Louisville on October 7, 1959. Dupas, the future World Junior Middleweight Champion, was ranked third and had seventy-seven professional wins. Stitch won by a ten-round unanimous decision. Following his win over Dupas, Stitch fought Holly Mims, who was ranked eighth in world at middleweight. The fight took place in New Orleans, Louisiana on November 23, 1959. Stitch won by a ten-round split decision.

Stitch was scheduled to fight Carl Hubbard in Chicago, Illinois on January 6, 1960, but the Illinois State Athletic Commission discovered that he had a cataract on his left eye and barred him from fighting. He returned home and was examined by two Louisville eye specialists who determined that the cataract wasn't serious enough to halt his career. Stitch returned to the ring on February 17, 1960, and stopped Charley "Tombstone" Smith in four rounds.

Stitch, once again ranked second in the world, had a rematch with Ralph Dupas at Sydney Stadium in Sydney on May 2, 1960. They fought before a crowd of 11,000. Dupas came on strong after a sluggish start, using his speed and boxing skill to pile up points. Dupas won by a twelve-round unanimous decision.

On May 24, 1960, Stitch fought Stan Harrington in Honolulu, Hawaii. Stitch, behind on points midway thorough the fight, picked up the pace in the second half and won by a ten-round unanimous decision. The win advanced his record to 27–7 with 13 knockouts.

Stitch used to spar with a Louisville amateur named Cassius Clay, later known as Muhammad Ali. Young Ali would occasionally train at Bud Bruner's Headline Boxing Gym and test himself against the more experienced Stitch. Rich Keeling, a former boxer and promoter, said, "Cassius would leave everyday, saying, 'I'll be back tomorrow, and I'm going to get you then.' A week or two later, here he'd come. He never did get to where he could handle Rudell." Three months after Stitch's death, Ali won a gold medal at the 1960 Olympics in Rome, Italy.

== Death ==
On June 5, 1960, Stitch went fishing with his friend Charles Oliver, Bud Bruner, and Bruner's son. While they were fishing on a rock shelf below the McAlpine Locks and Dam, Oliver slipped into the Ohio River, grabbing Stitch and dragging him in as well. As Stitch was swimming to shore, he heard Oliver yelling and swam back to get him. Both men were weighed-down by heavy waders and coats, and disappeared in the turbulent water. Their bodies were found by the Coast Guard hours later.

Stitch died the day before he was to sign for a rematch with Luis Manuel Rodriguez. The fight would have taken place on July 24, 1960.

Rodriguez fought former World Welterweight Champion Virgil Akins at Freedom Hall in Louisville on July 6, 1960. Promoter Bill King set aside 35% of the gross gate for Stitch's widow and six children. Bud Bruner accepted an invitation to act as one of Akins' seconds.

The month following Stitch's death, the National Boxing Association announced the creation of the Rudell Stitch Sportsmanship Award, which would be presented annually to the professional boxer who displayed the most sportsmanship in and out of the ring.

For his tremendous sacrifice, Stitch posthumously received a silver medal from the Carnegie Hero Fund. Only three other people have received two Carnegie Hero Fund medals. A Bible verse that Stitch—an elder in the Hope Presbyterian Church—had doubtless heard many times in his young life encircles the outer edges of his two Carnegie Hero Medals: "Greater love hath no man than this, that a man lay down his life for his friends" (John 15:13).

== Family ==
On January 20, 1964, Stitch's widow, Rosa Mae Stitch, was shot and killed at her home while her six children slept in adjoining rooms. She was the victim of what was believed to be a murder-suicide incident. Her body, a bullet wound in the upper chest, was found lying against a bathroom door. Philander Bryant, whom she had been dating, was found just a few feet away with a bullet wound to the head. Bryant died the following day.

"Our grandmother came down from Detroit when our father died, and after mother passed, she kept all of us together at the house there – instead of us getting separated," Donald Stitch, the oldest child, remembered. "She took us to church, worked day work, got Social Security, and we never wanted for anything. The lights were never turned out."

Donald Stitch played football and earned a scholarship to Jackson State University.

Stitch's youngest child, Daryl, boxed as an amateur and was trained by Bud Bruner. On October 9, 1982, Stitch boxed Charles Love in the welterweight semi-final of the USA/ABF Kentucky Association Senior Open Championship. The bout was a slugfest. Stitch took one standing eight-count, and Love took two. The fight was stopped at 1:55 of the first round in favor of Stitch. Following the stoppage, Love walked to his corner, sat down on his stool and then slumped over unconscious. He was hospitalized and had two operations to remove blood clots from his brain. Love died six days after the fight.

== Hometown honor ==
On June 5, 2013, the 53rd anniversary of his death, Stitch was honored with a giant Hometown Hero mural in Louisville. The mural was placed on the 4th Street Live! parking garage along Fifth Street, next to the Cathedral of the Assumption. Stitch was the 22nd Louisvillian to be honored with a Hometown Hero mural under a program created by the Greater Louisville Pride Foundation in 2002. Others include athletes Muhammad Ali, Pee Wee Reese, Mary T. Meagher, Pat Day, Paul Hornung, Darrell Griffith and Phil Simms, as well as Kentucky Fried Chicken founder Harland Sanders, artist Ed Hamilton, basketball coach Denny Crum, actor Victor Mature and broadcaster Diane Sawyer.

Stitch was inducted into the Kentucky Athletic Hall of Fame in 2014. Each inductee is recognized with a bronze plaque that hangs inside Louisville's Freedom Hall.

Kentucky singer-songwriter Mickey Clark, who used to do morning roadwork with Stitch, paid tribute to his friend with two tracks on his 2014 album Reasons & Rhymes. The album concludes with "Song for Rudell (Stitch)" and "Rudell's Story," a recording of Stitch's son speaking about his father.
