= Luis Manuel Rodríguez =

Cuban boxer (1937–1996)

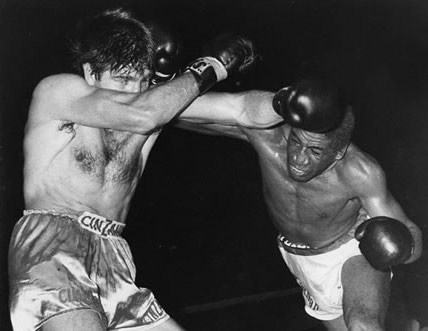
- Rodríguez (right) vs. Nino Benvenuti in 1969

Personal information
- Nickname: El Feo
- Born: Luis Manuel Rodríguez; 17 June 1937 Camagüey, Cuba
- Died: 8 July 1996 (aged 59) Miami, Florida, U.S.
- Height: 172 cm (5 ft 8 in)
- Weight: Welterweight; Middleweight; Light middleweight

Boxing career
- Stance: Orthodox

Boxing record
- Total fights: 121
- Wins: 107
- Win by KO: 49
- Losses: 13
- No contests: 1

Luis Manuel Rodríguez (17 June 1937 – 8 July 1996) was a Cuban professional boxer. Known as "El Feo", he began his career in pre-Castro Havana. In Cuba, he twice defeated the ill-fated future welterweight champion Benny Paret. He held the Undisputed Welterweight Championship in 1963, and challenged once for the WBA, and WBC middleweight titles in 1969.

After the Cuban Revolution, Rodríguez campaigned in the United States. Fighting out of Miami, Rodriguez decisioned top welterweights such as Virgil Akins and Rudell Stitch.

== Professional career ==
He was unbeaten in 36 fights before losing a split decision to Emile Griffith in a 1960 non-title fight. In 1963, Rodriguez and Griffith fought twice for the lineal welterweight title. Rodriguez defeated Griffith by a unanimous decision to win the title, but Griffith regained it three months later with a split decision. Their fourth and final meeting came in 1964, with Griffith retaining the welterweight title with a split decision.

Rodriguez was trained by Angelo Dundee at the old 5th Street Gym in Miami Beach alongside Ralph Dupas, Willie Pastrano, Florentino Fernández and Pinklon Thomas.

Rodriguez was ringside and provided ancillary television commentary for the nationally televised Thursday night, 21 March 1963 Dodger Stadium featherweight championship bout between reigning champ Davey Moore and Sugar Ramos, won after ten rounds by technical knockout (TKO) by Ramos and resulting within the hour in a comatose state for Moore, and ultimately his death on 25 March. He had just beaten Griffith (who had himself fought Benny Paret in another tragic fight) for the world Welterweight title in the same program. Moore's death was memorialized by recording artist Bob Dylan in his long-unreleased (but widely bootlegged) song, "Who Killed Davey Moore?" (the complete telecast of the fight is available on YouTube, as are several of Dylan's various performances of the song.)

In November 1969, Rodriguez challenged Nino Benvenuti in Rome, Italy, for the middleweight world title. In the 11th round, slightly ahead on points but tiring and badly cut, Benvenuti suddenly landed a perfect left hook that left Rodriguez on the floor for 5 minutes.

Rodriguez retired in 1972 after losing to Donato Paduano in Montreal. He died on 8 July 1996 at South Shore Hospital in Miami Beach.

He was inducted into the International Boxing Hall of Fame in 1997. In 2009 The Ring magazine ranked Rodriguez as the third-greatest Cuban boxer of all time, behind Kid Gavilán and Kid Chocolate.

== Eastern Airlines Flight 202 ==
Rodriguez and his trainers were among 33 passengers on Eastern Airlines flight 202 from Miami to Dallas, Texas, when that flight got hijacked and taken to Cuba on July 24, 1961. Rodriguez was fearful for his life since he had escaped from Cuba recently. However, Cuban authorities allowed the plane and its passengers to return to the United States without further incident. Rodriguez was on his way to a fight versus Curtis Cokes, which he eventually lost by split decision some days later, on August 3.

== Professional boxing record ==
121 fights	107 wins	13 losses
By knockout	49	3
By decision	57	10
By disqualification	1	0
No contests	1	

No.	Result	Record	Opponent	Type	Round	Date	Location	Notes
121	Loss	107–13 (1)	Donato Paduano	SD	10	Apr 12, 1971	Paul Sauve Arena, Montreal, Quebec, Canada	
120	Loss	107–12 (1)	Mike Lankester	MD	10	Mar 16, 1971	Seattle Center Arena, Seattle, Washington, U.S.	
119	Win	107–11 (1)	Dave Hilton	UD	10	Nov 30, 1971	Convention Center, Miami Beach, Florida, U.S.	
118	Win	106–11 (1)	Mike Padgett	KO	2 (10)	Nov 1, 1971	Lander College Athletic Gym, Greenwood, South Carolina, U.S.	
117	Loss	105–11 (1)	Rafael Gutierrez	TKO	6 (10)	Aug 3, 1971	Civic Auditorium, San Francisco, California, U.S.	
116	Loss	105–10 (1)	Bunny Sterling	PTS	10	May 25, 1971	Royal Albert Hall, Kensington, London, England, U.K.	
115	Win	105–9 (1)	Tony Mundine	KO	1 (10)	Aug 7, 1971	North Melbourne Oval, Melbourne, Victoria, Australia	
114	Win	104–9 (1)	Bobby Cassidy	SD	10	Jan 26, 1971	Auditorium, Miami Beach, Florida, U.S.	
113	Win	103–9 (1)	J C Ponder	KO	5 (10)	Dec 1, 1970	Auditorium, Miami Beach, Florida, U.S.	
112	Win	102–9 (1)	Jose Gonzalez	UD	12	Sep 24, 1970	Convention Center, Miami Beach, Florida, U.S.	
111	Win	101–9 (1)	Fraser Scott	MD	10	Aug 20, 1970	Seattle Center Coliseum, Seattle, Washington, U.S.	
110	Loss	100–9 (1)	Jose Gonzalez	PTS	10	Jul 31, 1970	Hiram Bithorn Stadium, San Juan, Puerto Rico	
109	Win	100–8 (1)	Baby Boy Rolle	TKO	5 (10)	Jun 27, 1970	Dinner Key Auditorium, Coconut Grove, Florida, U.S.	
108	Win	99–8 (1)	Willie Warren	UD	10	Apr 14, 1970	Auditorium, Miami Beach, Florida, U.S.	
107	Win	98–8 (1)	Joe Cokes	TKO	4 (10)	Mar 17, 1970	Auditorium, Miami Beach, Florida, U.S.	
106	Win	97–8 (1)	Porter Rolle	KO	4 (10)	Feb 10, 1970	Auditorium, Miami Beach, Florida, U.S.	
105	Loss	96–8 (1)	Nino Benvenuti	KO	11 (15)	Nov 22, 1969	Palazzetto dello Sport, Roma, Lazio, Italy	For WBA, WBC, and The Ring middleweight titles
104	Win	96–7 (1)	Tom Bethea	UD	10	Sep 23, 1969	Auditorium, Miami Beach, Florida, U.S.	
103	Win	95–7 (1)	David Beckles	TKO	2 (10)	Aug 12, 1969	Auditorium, Miami Beach, Florida, U.S.	
102	Win	94–7 (1)	Eddie Owens	KO	7 (10)	Jul 8, 1969	Auditorium, Miami Beach, Florida, U.S.	
101	Win	93–7 (1)	Rafael Gutierrez	TKO	6 (12)	Mar 31, 1969	Sports Arena, San Diego, California, U.S.	
100	Win	92–7 (1)	Bobby Williams	TKO	7 (10)	Feb 20, 1969	Fort Homer Hesterly Armory, Tampa, Florida, U.S.	
99	Win	91–7 (1)	Doug Huntley	UD	10	Jan 21, 1969	Auditorium, Miami Beach, Florida, U.S.	
98	Win	90–7 (1)	Joe Shaw	UD	10	Nov 15, 1968	Madison Square Garden, Manhattan, New York City, New York, U.S.	
97	Win	89–7 (1)	Rudy Rodriguez	TKO	4 (10)	Sep 4, 1968	Hiram Bithorn Stadium, San Juan, Puerto Rico	
96	Win	88–7 (1)	Vicente Rondón	UD	10	Jul 18, 1968	Hiram Bithorn Stadium, San Juan, Puerto Rico	
95	Loss	87–7 (1)	Vicente Rondón	UD	10	Jun 3, 1968	Hiram Bithorn Stadium, San Juan, Puerto Rico	
94	Win	87–6 (1)	Ted Wright	UD	10	May 5, 1968	Auditorium, Miami Beach, Florida, U.S.	
93	Win	86–6 (1)	Carl Moore	UD	10	Mar 26, 1968	Auditorium, Miami Beach, Florida, U.S.	
92	Win	85–6 (1)	Charley Austin	TKO	6 (10)	Feb 6, 1968	Auditorium, Miami Beach, Florida, U.S.	
91	Win	84–6 (1)	Bennie Briscoe	UD	10	Dec 15, 1967	Madison Square Garden, Manhattan, New York City, New York, U.S.	
90	Win	83–6 (1)	Candy McFarland	PTS	10	Nov 16, 1967	Maracaibo, Venezuela	
89	Win	82–6 (1)	Percy Manning	TKO	1 (10)	Nov 6, 1967	Nuevo Circo, Caracas, Venezuela	
88	Win	81–6 (1)	Phil Robinson	KO	3 (10)	Sep 29, 1967	Caracas, Venezuela	
87	Win	80–6 (1)	Ferd Hernandez	UD	10	Sep 7, 1967	Coliseum Arena, Oakland, California, U.S.	
86	Win	79–6 (1)	Jimmy Lester	UD	10	Jun 28, 1967	Coliseum Arena, Oakland, California, U.S.	
85	Win	78–6 (1)	Juan Carlos Rivero	UD	10	Jun 4, 1967	Hiram Bithorn Stadium, San Juan, Puerto Rico	
84	Win	77–6 (1)	Bennie Briscoe	UD	10	Mar 20, 1967	Arena, Philadelphia, Pennsylvania, U.S.	
83	Win	76–6 (1)	Esteban Alfredo Osuna	PTS	10	Feb 18, 1967	Rosario, Santa Fe, Argentina	
82	Win	75–6 (1)	Manuel Alvarez	KO	8 (10)	Jan 20, 1967	Club Atletico Quilmes, Mar del Plata, Buenos Aires, Argentina	
81	Win	74–6 (1)	Ruben Orrico	TKO	4 (10)	Sep 24, 1966	Rosario, Santa Fe, Argentina	
80	Win	73–6 (1)	Juarez de Lima	KO	3 (10)	Sep 9, 1966	Estadio Norte, Rosario, Santa Fe, Argentina	
79	Loss	72–6 (1)	Curtis Cokes	TKO	15 (15)	Jul 6, 1966	Municipal Auditorium, New Orleans, Louisiana, U.S.	
78	Win	72–5 (1)	Tommy Caldwell	TKO	2 (10)	May 7, 1966	Hiram Bithorn Stadium, San Juan, Puerto Rico	
77	Loss	71–5 (1)	Percy Manning	SD	10	Apr 11, 1966	Arena, Philadelphia, Pennsylvania, U.S.	
76	Win	71–4 (1)	George Benton	TKO	9 (10)	Mar 7, 1966	Arena, Philadelphia, Pennsylvania, U.S.	
75	Win	70–4 (1)	Joey Limas	TKO	4 (10)	Jan 25, 1966	Civic Auditorium, Albuquerque, New Mexico, U.S.	
74	Win	69–4 (1)	Fred McWilliams	TKO	9 (10)	Jan 18, 1966	Sportatorium, Phoenix, Arizona, U.S.	
73	Win	68–4 (1)	Joe Louis Murphy	KO	4 (10)	Dec 20, 1965	Civic Auditorium, Albuquerque, New Mexico, U.S.	
72	Win	67–4 (1)	Eddie Pace	UD	10	Dec 2, 1965	Olympic Auditorium, Los Angeles, California, U.S.	
71	Win	66–4 (1)	Cecil Mott	TKO	4 (10)	Nov 16, 1965	Auditorium, Miami Beach, Florida, U.S.	
70	Win	65–4 (1)	Johnny Morris	TKO	2 (10)	Oct 4, 1965	Arena, Philadelphia, Pennsylvania, U.S.	
69	Win	64–4 (1)	Rubin Carter	UD	10	Aug 26, 1965	Olympic Auditorium, Los Angeles, California, U.S.	
68	Win	63–4 (1)	Charley Austin	UD	10	Aug 3, 1965	Sportatorium, Phoenix, Arizona, U.S.	
67	Win	62–4 (1)	Jose Assuncao	UD	10	Jul 26, 1965	Hacienda Hotel, Las Vegas, Nevada, U.S.	
66	Win	61–4 (1)	Memo Ayon	RTD	3 (10)	Jul 16, 1965	Olympic Auditorium, Los Angeles, California, U.S.	
65	Win	60–4 (1)	Rip Randall	UD	10	Apr 21, 1965	Curtis Hixon Hall, Tampa, Florida, U.S.	
64	Win	59–4 (1)	John Henry Smith	KO	10 (10)	Mar 26, 1965	Olympic Auditorium, Los Angeles, California, U.S.	
63	Win	58–4 (1)	Rubin Carter	UD	10	Feb 12, 1965	Madison Square Garden, Manhattan, New York City, New York, U.S.	
62	Win	57–4 (1)	LC Morgan	KO	2 (10)	Nov 14, 1964	El Toreo de Cuatro Caminos, Mexico City, Distrito Federal, Mexico	
61	Loss	56–4 (1)	Emile Griffith	SD	15	Jun 12, 1964	Auditorium, Miami Beach, Florida, U.S.	For WBA, WBC, NYSAC, and The Ring welterweight titles
60	Win	56–3 (1)	Jesse Smith	UD	10	Apr 4, 1964	Auditorium, Miami Beach, Florida, U.S.	
59	Win	55–3 (1)	Holley Mims	UD	10	Mar 20, 1964	Madison Square Garden, Manhattan, New York City, New York, U.S.	
58	Win	54–3 (1)	Wilbert McClure	UD	10	Dec 27, 1963	Auditorium, Miami Beach, Florida, U.S.	
57	Win	53–3 (1)	Wilbert McClure	UD	10	Oct 18, 1963	Madison Square Garden, Manhattan, New York City, New York, U.S.	
56	Win	52–3 (1)	Denny Moyer	TKO	9 (10)	Aug 17, 1963	Convention Center, Miami Beach, Florida, U.S.	
55	Loss	51–3 (1)	Emile Griffith	SD	15	Jun 8, 1963	Madison Square Garden, Manhattan, New York City, New York, U.S.	Lost WBA, WBC, NYSAC, and The Ring, welterweight titles
54	Win	51–2 (1)	Emile Griffith	UD	15	Mar 21, 1963	Dodger Stadium, Los Angeles, California, U.S.	Won WBA, WBC, NYSAC, and The Ring welterweight titles
53	Win	50–2 (1)	Joey Giambra	UD	10	Jan 19, 1963	Auditorium, Miami Beach, Florida, U.S.	
52	Win	49–2 (1)	Mel Collins	UD	10	Dec 12, 1962	Auditorium, Miami Beach, Florida, U.S.	
51	Win	48–2 (1)	Santiago Gutierrez	TKO	3 (10)	Nov 6, 1962	Municipal Auditorium, San Antonio, Texas, U.S.	
50	Win	47–2 (1)	Ernest Burford	TKO	7 (10)	Aug 29, 1962	Auditorium, Miami Beach, Florida, U.S.	
49	Win	46–2 (1)	Gene Armstrong	TKO	8 (10)	Jun 3, 1962	Madison Square Garden, Manhattan, New York City, New York, U.S.	
48	Win	45–2 (1)	Yama Bahama	TKO	3 (10)	May 5, 1962	St. Nicholas Arena, Manhattan, New York City, New York, U.S.	
47	Win	44–2 (1)	Ricardo Falech	TKO	3 (10)	Mar 17, 1962	Auditorium, Miami Beach, Florida, U.S.	
46	Win	43–2 (1)	Luis Federico Thompson	UD	10	Jan 27, 1962	Madison Square Garden, Manhattan, New York City, New York, U.S.	
45	Win	42–2 (1)	Curtis Cokes	UD	10	Dec 2, 1961	Convention Center, Miami Beach, Florida, U.S.	
44	Win	41–2 (1)	Jose Gonzalez	TKO	7 (10)	Oct 24, 1961	Auditorium, Miami Beach, Florida, U.S.	
43	Win	40–2 (1)	Guy Sumlin	TKO	5 (10)	Sep 13, 1961	Auditorium, Miami Beach, Florida, U.S.	
42	Loss	39–2 (1)	Curtis Cokes	SD	10	Aug 3, 1961	Memorial Auditorium, Dallas, Texas, U.S.	
41	Win	39–1 (1)	Alfredo Cota	KO	4 (10)	May 13, 1961	Arena Coliseo, Guadalajara, Jalisco, Mexico	
40	Win	38–1 (1)	Alvaro Gutierrez	TKO	5 (10)	Apr 15, 1961	Arena Mexico, Mexico City, Distrito Federal, Mexico	
39	Win	37–1 (1)	Johnny Gonsalves	UD	10	Mar 22, 1961	Auditorium, Oakland, California, U.S.	
38	Win	36–1 (1)	Lyle Mackin	TKO	5 (10)	Feb 21, 1961	Auditorium, Oakland, California, U.S.	
37	Loss	35–1 (1)	Emile Griffith	SD	10	Dec 17, 1960	Madison Square Garden, Manhattan, New York City, New York, U.S.	
36	Win	35–0 (1)	Johnny Gonsalves	UD	10	Nov 28, 1960	Civic Auditorium, San Francisco, California, U.S.	
35	Win	34–0 (1)	Yama Bahama	MD	10	Nov 16, 1960	Auditorium, Miami Beach, Florida, U.S.	
34	Win	33–0 (1)	Mel Collins	UD	10	Oct 24, 1960	Fort Homer Hesterly Armory, Tampa, Florida, U.S.	
33	Win	32–0 (1)	Basil Campbell	KO	5 (10)	Aug 17, 1960	Coliseo Nacional, Havana, Cuba	
32	Win	31–0 (1)	Virgil Akins	UD	10	Jul 6, 1960	Freedom Hall, Louisville, Kentucky, U.S.	
31	Win	30–0 (1)	Alfredo Cota	KO	2 (10)	May 26, 1960	Olympic Auditorium, Los Angeles, California, U.S.	
30	Win	29–0 (1)	Alvaro Gutierrez	TKO	4 (12)	Apr 7, 1960	Olympic Auditorium, Los Angeles, California, U.S.	
29	Win	28–0 (1)	Chico Vejar	UD	10	May 2, 1960	Auditorium, Miami Beach, Florida, U.S.	
28	Win	27–0 (1)	Carl Hubbard	KO	4 (10)	Feb 10, 1960	Convention Center, Miami Beach, Florida, U.S.	
27	Win	26–0 (1)	Garnet Hart	UD	10	Dec 23, 1959	Auditorium, Miami Beach, Florida, U.S.	
26	Win	25–0 (1)	Isaac Logart	UD	10	Oct 21, 1959	Auditorium, Miami Beach, Florida, U.S.	
25	Win	24–0 (1)	Larry Baker	UD	10	Oct 3, 1959	Coliseo de la Ciudad, Havana, Cuba	
24	Win	23–0 (1)	Rudell Stitch	SD	10	Aug 26, 1959	State Fairgrounds Coliseum, Louisville, Kentucky, U.S.	
23	Win	22–0 (1)	Virgil Akins	UD	10	Jun 17, 1959	Exhibition Hall, Miami Beach, Florida, U.S.	
22	Win	21–0 (1)	Cecil Shorts	KO	9 (10)	May 9, 1959	Coliseo de la Ciudad, Havana, Cuba	
21	Win	20–0 (1)	Joe Miceli	TKO	5 (10)	Feb 21, 1959	Coliseo de la Ciudad, Havana, Cuba	
20	Win	19–0 (1)	Juan Padilla	PTS	10	Nov 22, 1958	Coliseo de la Ciudad, Havana, Cuba	
19	Win	18–0 (1)	Kid Fichique	UD	12	Sep 20, 1958	Coliseo de la Ciudad, Havana, Cuba	
18	Win	17–0 (1)	Benny Paret	SD	10	Aug 9, 1958	Coliseo de la Ciudad, Havana, Cuba	
17	Win	16–0 (1)	Charley Scott	KO	9 (10)	Jul 26, 1958	Coliseo de la Ciudad, Havana, Cuba	
16	Win	15–0 (1)	Tony Armenteros	PTS	10	Apr 19, 1958	Palacio de Deportes, Havana, Cuba	
15	Win	14–0 (1)	Rolando Rodriguez	KO	4 (10)	Mar 29, 1958	Palacio de Deportes, Havana, Cuba	
14	Win	13–0 (1)	Benny Paret	UD	10	Feb 8, 1958	Palacio de Deportes, Havana, Cuba	
13	Win	12–0 (1)	Rolando Rodriguez	PTS	8	Nov 16, 1957	Palacio de Deportes, Havana, Cuba	
12	Win	11–0 (1)	Gomeo Brennan	PTS	8	Sep 28, 1957	Palacio de Deportes, Havana, Cuba	
11	Win	10–0 (1)	Guillermo Diaz	DQ	6 (8)	Jul 20, 1957	Palacio de Deportes, Havana, Cuba	
10	Win	9–0 (1)	Guillermo Diaz	PTS	6	Jun 22, 1957	Palacio de Deportes, Havana, Cuba	
9	Win	8–0 (1)	Vicente Reyes	PTS	6	May 18, 1957	Palacio de Deportes, Havana, Cuba	
8	Win	7–0 (1)	Vicente Reyes	PTS	6	Mar 23, 1957	Palacio de Deportes, Havana, Cuba	
7	Win	6–0 (1)	Guillermo Diaz	PTS	6	Feb 16, 1957	Palacio de Deportes, Havana, Cuba	
6	Win	5–0 (1)	Jose Hernandez	KO	5 (6)	Jan 12, 1957	Arena Trejo, Havana, Cuba	
5	NC	4–0 (1)	Jose Hernandez	NC	2 (6)	Dec 15, 1956	Arena Trejo, Havana, Cuba	Bout suspended by rain downpour
4	Win	4–0	Pablo Cardenas	TKO	2 (6)	Nov 24, 1956	Palacio de Deportes, Havana, Cuba	
3	Win	3–0	Julian Yanez	PTS	4	Oct 20, 1956	Palacio de Deportes, Havana, Cuba	
2	Win	2–0	Vicente Reyes	PTS	4	Jul 21, 1956	Palacio de Deportes, Havana, Cuba	
1	Win	1–0	Lazaro Hernandez Kessell	KO	3 (4)	Jun 2, 1956	Palacio de Deportes, Havana, Cuba	

== Titles in boxing ==
=== Major world titles ===
- NYSAC welterweight champion (147 lbs)
- WBA welterweight champion (147 lbs)
- WBC welterweight champion (147 lbs)

=== The Ring magazine titles ===
- The Ring welterweight champion (147 lbs)

=== Undisputed titles ===
- Undisputed welterweight champion

== See also ==
- List of world welterweight boxing champions

Sporting positions
World boxing titles
Preceded by Emile Griffith	WBA welterweight champion March 21, 1963 – June 8, 1963	Succeeded by Emile Griffith
Preceded by Emile Griffith	WBC welterweight champion March 21, 1963 – June 8, 1963	Succeeded by Emile Griffith
Preceded by Emile Griffith	The Ring welterweight champion March 21, 1963 – June 8, 1963	Succeeded by Emile Griffith
Preceded by Emile Griffith	Undisputed welterweight champion March 21, 1963 – June 8, 1963	Succeeded by Emile Griffith
