= Kenny Lane =

American boxer (1932–2008)

Personal information
- Born: Kenneth L. Lane; April 9, 1932 Big Rapids, Michigan, U.S.
- Died: August 5, 2008 (aged 76) Lansing, Michigan, U.S.
- Height: 5 ft 5 in (1.65 m)
- Weight: Lightweight

Boxing career
- Stance: Southpaw

Boxing record
- Total fights: 100
- Wins: 82
- Win by KO: 19
- Losses: 16
- Draws: 2

Kenny Lane (April 9, 1932 – August 5, 2008) was an American southpaw (left-handed) boxer. He fought for lightweight and light welterweight titles of the world, once against Joe Brown and twice against Carlos Ortiz.

== Early life ==
Lane was raised on a farm in Big Rapids, Michigan with his four brothers and sister. According to his family, he regularly fought with his brothers and it is assumed that his southpaw stance was adopted to defend himself against his older brother who later became an Olympic boxer.

== Professional boxing career ==
Lane was known for having a very unorthodox way of fighting. This combined with the fact that he was a southpaw made him an excellent boxer and in 1953 started his professional career.

Quote from Ortiz: "No one was more difficult to figure out than Kenny Lane, the guy was unbelievably clever"

He had a controversial decision loss to Joe Brown for undisputed lightweight championship of the world. He fought the Ortiz rubber match for light welterweight title.

Lane decided at age 50 to round out his professional career to 100 bouts. He dropped to his fighting weight from almost 200 pounds. After beating 3 much younger opponents he lost to the fourth. Lane decided to retire for the final time, making the even 100 bouts he sought.

== Family life ==
Lane married his wife Ruth as a teenager in West Virginia. They had 4 children.

== Later years ==
After retiring Lane continued teaching boxing in the Muskegon area. He ran the boxing program at the Muskegon Area Boxing Club.

In 1995, British singer Morrissey released an album called Southpaw Grammar. The cover featured an old photograph of Lane from the April 1963 issue of The Ring magazine.

Lane was admitted into the World Boxing Hall of Fame in 2004.

Later in life Lane became an avid golfer and had a tournament named for him. He died of a heart attack on August 5, 2008, alongside one of his most well known students, Christian Lloyd in Lansing, Michigan.

== Professional boxing record ==
100 fights	82 wins	16 losses
By knockout	19	5
By decision	63	11
Draws	2	

No.	Result	Record	Opponent	Type	Round, time	Date	Age	Location	Notes
100	Loss	82–16–2	Dave Guerra	SD	8	Nov 2, 1983	51 years, 207 days	Grand Center, Grand Rapids, Michigan, US	
99	Win	82–15–2	Willie McIntosh	KO	8 (8)	Jun 18, 1983	51 years, 70 days	Muskegon, Michigan, US	
98	Win	81–15–2	Paul Lewis	KO	2 (?)	Apr 16, 1983	51 years, 7 days	Catholic Central Highschool, Muskegon, Michigan, US	
97	Win	80–15–2	Bobby Plegge	UD	8	Jul 17, 1982	50 years, 99 days	Galaxy Arena, Muskegon, Michigan, US	
96	Loss	79–15–2	Eddie Perkins	UD	12	Oct 25, 1964	32 years, 199 days	Municipal Auditorium, New Orleans, Louisiana, US	
95	Loss	79–14–2	Carlos Hernández	TKO	2 (10)	Oct 5, 1964	32 years, 179 days	Estadio Luis Aparicio, Maracaibo, Venezuela	
94	Loss	79–13–2	Dave Charnley	PTS	10	Jun 2, 1964	32 years, 54 days	Empire Pool, Wembley, London, England, UK	
93	Win	79–12–2	Stoffel Steyn	RTD	8 (10)	May 9, 1964	32 years, 30 days	Ellis Park Tennis Stadium, Johannesburg, South Africa	
92	Loss	78–12–2	Carlos Ortiz	UD	15	Apr 11, 1964	32 years, 2 days	Hiram Bithorn Stadium, San Juan, Puerto Rico	For WBA, WBC, and The Ring lightweight titles
91	Win	78–11–2	Johnny Bizzarro	SD	10	Feb 19, 1964	31 years, 316 days	Tech Memorial Gym, Erie, Pennsylvania, US	
90	Win	77–11–2	Paul Armstead	UD	15	Aug 19, 1963	31 years, 132 days	Veterans Memorial Stadium, Saginaw, Michigan, US	Won vacant world lightweight title (Michigan version)
89	Win	76–11–2	Vicente Derado	UD	10	Mar 2, 1963	30 years, 327 days	Madison Square Garden, New York City, New York, US	
88	Win	75–11–2	Len Matthews	TKO	9 (10), 2:54	Sep 15, 1962	30 years, 159 days	Arena, Philadelphia, Pennsylvania, US	
87	Win	74–11–2	Carlos Hernández	UD	10	Jul 14, 1962	30 years, 96 days	Madison Square Garden, New York City, New York, US	
86	Win	73–11–2	Tommy Tibbs	UD	10	Jun 11, 1962	30 years, 63 days	Arena, Boston, Massachusetts, US	
85	Win	72–11–2	Luis Molina	UD	10	Apr 14, 1962	30 years, 5 days	Civic Auditorium, San Jose, California, US	
84	Loss	71–11–2	Garland 'Rip' Randall	UD	10	Jan 23, 1962	29 years, 289 days	Sam Houston Coliseum, Houston, Texas, US	
83	Win	71–10–2	Aissa Hashas	PTS	10	Oct 16, 1961	29 years, 190 days	Palais des Sports, Paris, France	
82	Win	70–10–2	Virgil Akins	UD	10	Sep 22, 1961	29 years, 166 days	Navy-Marine Corps Mem. Stadium, Annapolis, Maryland, US	
81	Win	69–10–2	Garland 'Rip' Randall	UD	10	Aug 30, 1961	29 years, 143 days	Sports Arena, Amarillo, Texas, US	
80	Win	68–10–2	T.J. Jones	UD	10	Aug 14, 1961	29 years, 127 days	Vogue Arena, Chicago, Illinois, US	
79	Win	67–10–2	Willie Robertson	UD	6	Jun 30, 1961	29 years, 82 days	L.C. Walker Arena, Muskegon, Michigan, US	
78	Win	66–10–2	Ray Portilla	TKO	6 (10)	Jun 16, 1961	29 years, 68 days	Municipal Auditorium, San Antonio, Texas, US	
77	Draw	65–10–2	Curtis Cokes	SD	10	Jun 8, 1961	29 years, 60 days	Texas Livestock Coliseum, Dallas, Texas, US	
76	Win	65–10–1	Manuel Gonzalez	UD	10	May 16, 1961	29 years, 37 days	Ector County Coliseum, Odessa, Texas, US	
75	Win	64–10–1	Garland 'Rip' Randall	UD	10	May 1, 1961	29 years, 22 days	Sportatorium, Dallas, Texas, US	
74	Draw	63–10–1	Carlos Hernández	PTS	10	Feb 20, 1961	28 years, 317 days	Caracas, Venezuela	
73	Loss	63–10	Jose Stable	UD	10	Jan 23, 1961	28 years, 289 days	St. Nicholas Arena, New York City, New York, US	
72	Win	63–9	Lahouari Godih	MD	10	Dec 6, 1960	28 years, 241 days	Convention Hall, Philadelphia, Pennsylvania, US	
71	Loss	62–9	Len Matthews	TKO	3 (10), 2:51	Oct 8, 1960	28 years, 182 days	Olympic Auditorium, Los Angeles, California, US	
70	Win	62–8	Sidney Adams	TKO	1 (10), 2:58	Sep 27, 1960	28 years, 171 days	Arena, Philadelphia, Pennsylvania, US	
69	Win	61–8	Douglas Vaillant	UD	10	Aug 16, 1960	28 years, 129 days	Auditorium, Miami Beach, Florida, US	
68	Win	60–8	Jerry Black	UD	10	Apr 25, 1960	28 years, 16 days	Alhambra Athletic Club, Philadelphia, Pennsylvania, US	
67	Loss	59–8	Ralph Dupas	UD	10	Jan 13, 1960	27 years, 279 days	Fort Whiting Armory, Mobile, Alabama, US	
66	Win	59–7	Ray Lancaster	KO	3 (10), 2:20	Dec 29, 1959	27 years, 264 days	Auditorium, Minneapolis, Minnesota, US	
65	Win	58–7	Virgil Akins	MD	10	Oct 28, 1959	27 years, 202 days	Capitol Arena, Washington, DC, US	
64	Loss	57–7	Carlos Ortiz	TKO	2 (15)	Jun 12, 1959	27 years, 64 days	Madison Square Garden, New York City, New York, US	For vacant NYSAC and NBA light welterweight titles
63	Win	57–6	Johnny Busso	TKO	6 (10)	Apr 17, 1959	27 years, 8 days	Legion Stadium, Hollywood, California, US	
62	Win	56–6	Carlos Ortiz	MD	10	Dec 31, 1958	26 years, 266 days	Auditorium, Miami Beach, Florida, US	
61	Win	55–6	Lahouari Godih	SD	10	Nov 7, 1958	26 years, 212 days	War Memorial Auditorium, Syracuse, New York, US	
60	Win	54–6	Orlando Zulueta	UD	10	Sep 6, 1958	26 years, 150 days	Catholic Central Stadium, Muskegon, Michigan, US	
59	Loss	53–6	Joe Brown	UD	15	Jul 23, 1958	26 years, 105 days	Sam Houston Coliseum, Houston, Texas, US	For NYSAC, NBA, and The Ring lightweight titles
58	Win	53–5	Davey Dupas	KO	6 (10), 0:40	May 26, 1958	26 years, 47 days	Sportatorium, Dallas, Texas, US	
57	Win	52–5	Johnny Gonsalves	UD	10	Jan 9, 1958	25 years, 275 days	Auditorium, Oakland, California, US	
56	Win	51–5	Luke Easter	TKO	8 (10), 1:51	Dec 9, 1957	25 years, 244 days	Civic Auditorium, San Francisco, California, US	
55	Win	50–5	Orlando Zulueta	UD	10	Oct 30, 1957	25 years, 204 days	Chicago Stadium, Chicago, Illinois, US	
54	Win	49–5	Johnny Gonsalves	UD	10	Aug 20, 1957	25 years, 133 days	Auditorium, Oakland, California, US	
53	Win	48–5	Teddy Davis	UD	10	Aug 3, 1957	25 years, 116 days	Muskegon, Michigan, US	
52	Win	47–5	Henry 'Toothpick' Brown	KO	6 (10), 1:14	May 22, 1957	25 years, 43 days	Olympia Stadium, Detroit, Michigan, US	
51	Win	46–5	Danny Davis	TKO	4 (10)	Apr 6, 1957	24 years, 362 days	Muskegon, Michigan, US	
50	Win	45–5	Frankie Ryff	TKO	6 (10), 0:32	Jan 30, 1957	24 years, 296 days	Biscayne Arena, Miami, Florida, US	
49	Win	44–5	Frankie Ryff	UD	10	Nov 14, 1956	24 years, 219 days	Biscayne Arena, Miami, Florida, US	
48	Win	43–5	Ludwig Lightburn	UD	10	Sep 19, 1956	24 years, 163 days	Biscayne Arena, Miami, Florida, US	
47	Win	42–5	Ralph Capone	TKO	5 (10), 2:57	Aug 30, 1956	24 years, 143 days	Catholic Central Stadium, Muskegon, Michigan, US	
46	Win	41–5	Glen Flanagan	UD	10	Aug 2, 1956	24 years, 115 days	Auditorium, Minneapolis, Minnesota, US	
45	Win	40–5	Ralph Dupas	SD	10	Jul 9, 1956	24 years, 91 days	Pelican Stadium, New Orleans, Louisiana, US	
44	Win	39–5	Danny Davis	UD	10	May 10, 1956	24 years, 31 days	Armory, Minneapolis, Minnesota, US	
43	Win	38–5	Enrique Esqueda	UD	10	Mar 25, 1956	23 years, 351 days	Plaza de Toros, Mexico City, Mexico	
42	Win	37–5	Ike Vaughn	UD	10	Feb 25, 1956	23 years, 322 days	Civic Center, Lansing, Michigan, US	
41	Win	36–5	Don Mason	UD	10	Dec 6, 1955	23 years, 241 days	Auditorium, Milwaukee, Wisconsin, US	
40	Win	35–5	Kid Centella	UD	10	Nov 7, 1955	23 years, 212 days	Coliseum Arena, New Orleans, Louisiana, US	
39	Loss	34–5	Paddy DeMarco	SD	10	Oct 3, 1955	23 years, 177 days	St. Nicholas Arena, New York City, New York, US	
38	Win	34–4	Hocine Khalfi	UD	10	Aug 16, 1955	23 years, 129 days	Auditorium, Miami Beach, Florida, US	
37	Win	33–4	Noel Humphreys	UD	10	Aug 4, 1955	23 years, 117 days	Island Park Stadium, Mount Pleasant, Michigan, US	
36	Win	32–4	Elmer Lakatos	TKO	8 (10)	Jul 28, 1955	23 years, 110 days	Marquette Stadium, Milwaukee, Wisconsin, US	
35	Win	31–4	Jimmy Ford	UD	10	Jul 12, 1955	23 years, 94 days	Auditorium, Miami Beach, Florida, US	
34	Win	30–4	Richie Howard	UD	10	Jun 28, 1955	23 years, 80 days	Halifax, Nova Scotia, Canada	
33	Win	29–4	Larry Boardman	UD	10	Jun 21, 1955	23 years, 73 days	Auditorium, Miami Beach, Florida, US	
32	Win	28–4	Eli Leggett	UD	10	Jun 7, 1955	23 years, 59 days	Motor City Arena, Detroit, Michigan, US	
31	Win	27–4	Richie Howard	PTS	10	May 30, 1955	23 years, 51 days	Halifax, Nova Scotia, Canada	
30	Win	26–4	Armand Savoie	UD	10	Mar 29, 1955	22 years, 354 days	Civic Auditorium, Grand Rapids, Michigan, US	
29	Loss	25–4	Ralph Dupas	SD	10	Mar 14, 1955	22 years, 339 days	Coliseum Arena, New Orleans, Louisiana, US	
28	Win	25–3	Jackie Blair	UD	10	Feb 14, 1955	22 years, 311 days	St. Nicholas Arena, New York City, New York, US	
27	Win	24–3	Danny Jo Perez	SD	10	Dec 13, 1954	22 years, 248 days	St. Nicholas Arena, New York City, New York, US	
26	Win	23–3	Orlando Zulueta	SD	10	Nov 8, 1954	22 years, 213 days	St. Nicholas Arena, New York City, New York, US	
25	Win	22–3	George Collins	PTS	10	Oct 4, 1954	22 years, 178 days	St. Nicholas Arena, New York City, New York, US	
24	Win	21–3	John Barnes	UD	10	Aug 12, 1954	22 years, 125 days	Marsh Field, Muskegon, Michigan, US	Retained USA Michigan State lightweight title
23	Win	20–3	Elmer Lakatos	UD	8	Jun 22, 1954	22 years, 74 days	Motor City Arena, Detroit, Michigan, US	
22	Win	19–3	Sammy Rodgers	UD	10	May 27, 1954	22 years, 48 days	Marsh Field, Muskegon, Michigan, US	Won vacant USA Michigan State lightweight title
21	Loss	18–3	John Barnes	UD	8	Mar 22, 1954	21 years, 347 days	Motor City Arena, Detroit, Michigan, US	
20	Loss	18–2	John Barnes	TKO	1 (8), 1:51	Feb 1, 1954	21 years, 298 days	Motor City Arena, Detroit, Michigan, US	
19	Win	18–1	Jesse Underwood	UD	10	Jan 14, 1954	21 years, 280 days	Auditorium, Saginaw, Michigan, US	
18	Win	17–1	Mike Tourcotte	UD	6	Jan 2, 1954	21 years, 268 days	Municipal Auditorium, New Orleans, Louisiana, US	
17	Win	16–1	Ronnie Stribling	UD	8	Dec 1, 1953	21 years, 236 days	Civic Auditorium, Grand Rapids, Michigan, US	
16	Loss	15–1	Ronnie Stribling	TKO	2 (8)	Oct 20, 1953	21 years, 194 days	Prudden Auditorium, Lansing, Michigan, US	
15	Win	15–0	Ken Hohner	UD	8	Sep 29, 1953	21 years, 173 days	Civic Auditorium, Grand Rapids, Michigan, US	
14	Win	14–0	Ralph Cervantes	UD	6	Sep 14, 1953	21 years, 158 days	Veterans Memorial Stadium, Saginaw, Michigan, US	
13	Win	13–0	Eddie Crawford	MD	6	Sep 10, 1953	21 years, 154 days	Motor City Arena, Detroit, Michigan, US	
12	Win	12–0	Don Grinton	TKO	3 (6), 3:00	Aug 20, 1953	21 years, 133 days	Motor City Arena, Detroit, Michigan, US	
11	Win	11–0	Dick Holling	KO	2 (4)	Aug 6, 1953	21 years, 119 days	Motor City Arena, Detroit, Michigan, US	
10	Win	10–0	Ron McGilvray	PTS	4	Jul 23, 1953	21 years, 105 days	Motor City Arena, Detroit, Michigan, US	
9	Win	9–0	Frank O'Neal	TKO	3 (4)	Jul 16, 1953	21 years, 98 days	Motor City Arena, Detroit, Michigan, US	
8	Win	8–0	Johnny Valentine	SD	4	Jun 18, 1953	21 years, 70 days	Motor City Arena, Detroit, Michigan, US	
7	Win	7–0	Benny Uhl	PTS	5	Jun 15, 1953	21 years, 67 days	Rainbo Arena, Chicago, Illinois, US	
6	Win	6–0	Milton Scott	PTS	4	May 23, 1953	21 years, 44 days	Rainbo Arena, Chicago, Illinois, US	
5	Win	5–0	Jimmy DeMura	PTS	4	May 11, 1953	21 years, 32 days	Rainbo Arena, Chicago, Illinois, US	
4	Win	4–0	Jimmy DeMura	PTS	4	Apr 30, 1953	21 years, 21 days	Motor City Arena, Detroit, Michigan, US	
3	Win	3–0	Bob Henry	KO	4 (4)	Apr 20, 1953	21 years, 11 days	Rainbo Arena, Chicago, Illinois, US	
2	Win	2–0	Jimmy DeMura	PTS	4	Apr 16, 1953	21 years, 7 days	Motor City Arena, Detroit, Michigan, US	
1	Win	1–0	Clinton McDade	PTS	4	Apr 9, 1953	21 years, 0 days	Civic Auditorium, Grand Rapids, Michigan, US	
