= Bud Bruner =

American boxing trainer

Edgar L. "Bud" Bruner (December 7, 1907 – February 21, 1996) was an American boxing manager, trainer, and gym proprietor from Louisville, Kentucky.

== Career ==
Bruner was a star athlete at duPont Manual High School in Louisville. He lettered in baseball, basketball, football and track. Bruner was inducted into the duPont Manual High School Alumni Association Hall of Fame in 2005.

His participation in boxing began in the 1930s while he was employed by the City of Louisville Recreation Department. He was responsible for playground tournaments, followed by district and city championships.

In 1939, Bruner became athletic director at the United States Army post it Fort Knox. His responsibilities included setting up and supervising several boxing gyms, organizing and supervising numerous boxing shows and tournaments, and selecting and accompanying a Fort Knox representative team to the State Golden Gloves Tournament. Bruner also managed the baseball team and coached the basketball team.

Among the baseball players Bruner managed at Fort Knox were future Major Leaguers Stan Lopata, Joe Garagiola, Roy Sievers, and Early Wynn.

Bruner's basketball teams went up against Adolph Rupp's Kentucky Wildcats four times. Although they lost all four games, Bruner liked to joke that he "knew how to play Rupp" because UK didn't score more than 68 points in any of the games. After seven years in Fort Knox, Bruner resigned and returned to Louisville.

From 1951 to 1959, he served as matchmaker for the Louisville Golden Gloves Tournament. He was also the matchmaker for the 1956 and 1960 Olympic Boxing Trials and for William H. King Promotions.

Bruner opened the Headline Boxing Gym in 1952 and started managing and training boxers. He trained fourteen Kentucky State Golden Gloves Champions, eight of whom were named the best boxer of the tournament. His most notable boxers were welterweight contender Rudell Stitch, future WBA World Heavyweight Champion Jimmy Ellis and Mayfield Pennington, who defeated former World Welterweight and Middleweight Champion Emile Griffith.

Muhammad Ali, then known as Cassius Clay, occasionally trained at Bruner's gym. His first gym workout after winning an Olympic gold medal in 1960 was at Bruner's Headline Gym. Larry Boeck wrote in the October 9, 1960, edition of the Courier-Journal: "Clay gives the impression, when Bruner's name is injected into the conversation, that he respects the ring knowledge of Bud in both matters of boxing technique and of integrity and astuteness in the often shady world of ring manipulations." When Ali turned professional, Bruner arranged for Tunney Hunsaker to be his first opponent. Bruner also worked Hunsaker's corner for the fight, which Ali won by decision.

Bruner suffered a spinal cord injury when he fell down the stairs at his gym in 1985. The injury left him using a wheelchair, but he continued to manage and train boxers until the fall of 1994. Bruner died on February 21, 1996, at Clark Memorial Hospital in Jeffersonville, Indiana.

== Head coaching record ==
Year	Team	Overall	Conference	Standing	Bowl/playoffs
Fort Knox Armoraiders (Independent) (1943)
1943	Fort Knox	4–2			
Fort Knox:		4–2			
Total:		4–2			
