= Joe Ngidi =

South African boxer

Joe "Axe Killer" Ngidi (19 March 1934 – 1 April 1990) was a South African professional boxer and trainer who rose to prominence during the 1950s and 1960s. Ngidi held the South African Black middleweight and welterweight titles during the era of apartheid-sanctioned sports segregation. He is widely regarded as one of the greatest "pound-for-pound" fighters the country has ever produced, despite being denied the opportunity to compete for a world title due to the political climate of his time.

== Early Life and Name ==
Joe Ngidi was born in Edendale today's KwaZulu-Natal province of South Africa, and discovered boxing as a youth in the local gymnasiums of Natal. His moniker, "Axe Killer," was a testament to his devastating "chopping" right hand. His punching style was said to resemble the swing of an axe, capable of felling opponents with clinical precision. Outside the ring, however, he was known as a humble, disciplined, and deeply religious man.

== Professional Career ==
=== Rise to Prominence and UK Campaign (1958) ===
Ngidi turned professional in the late 1940s, quickly gaining a reputation for his iron chin and relentless pressure. In 1958, seeking to bypass the limitations of the South African boxing scene, Ngidi traveled to the United Kingdom to test himself against international opposition. On June 10, 1958, at the Town Hall in Kensington, he faced the tough Ghanaian fighter Attu Clottey. While Ngidi lost the bout on points over ten rounds, the performance earned him respect from the British boxing press and proved he could compete at a world-class level.

== Domestic Dominance and Title Success ==
Upon returning to South Africa, Ngidi became a symbol of excellence in the "Non-White" boxing circuit.

=== Welterweight Success ===
In 1965, Ngidi reached the pinnacle of his domestic career when he faced Gilbert Petros for the South African Black Welterweight title. Ngidi secured a decisive victory, further cementing his legacy as a multi-divisional champion. He later moved up in weight to claim the South African Black Middleweight title, showcasing his versatility and power against larger opponents.

== Notable Rivalries and Cross-Border Bouts ==
Because of the apartheid "Color Bar" in South African sports, Ngidi often had to travel to neighboring protectorates or fight under unique conditions to face high-caliber white opponents or international stars:

- Willie Ludick: Ngidi engaged in a high-stakes rivalry with the white South African star Willie Ludick. Their encounters were significant cultural events that challenged the narrative of racial athletic hierarchy in South Africa.
- Bennie Nieuwenhuizen: Ngidi fought the hard-hitting Nieuwenhuizen in a series of bouts that are still discussed for their high level of technical proficiency and intensity.

== International fights ==
Ngidi also faced renowned Australian fighters Darby Brown and George Barnes. His bout against Barnes in 1959 was particularly notable, as Barnes was a highly ranked world contender; Ngidi's ability to hold his own against such opposition solidified his "uncrowned king" status. In 1965 Ngidi won a fight against Joe Brown, who was a former world champion of the United States, on points in a 10-round bout at Wembley Stadium in Johannesburg.

== Post-Boxing Career and Legacy ==
After retiring from the ring in the late 1960s, Ngidi transitioned into coaching. He became a boxing mentor in Durban, passing on his technical knowledge to a new generation. He was known for his strict adherence to "old school" fundamentals: footwork, balance, and the discipline to never take an eye off the opponent.

In 2004, Ngidi was posthumously honored at the South African Boxing Awards for his lifetime contribution to the sport, recognizing him as a pioneer who paved the way for future world champions like Dingaan Thobela and Brian Mitchell.

== Death ==
Joe Ngidi passed away on April 1, 1990.
