= Joe Brown (boxer) =

American boxer (1926–1997)

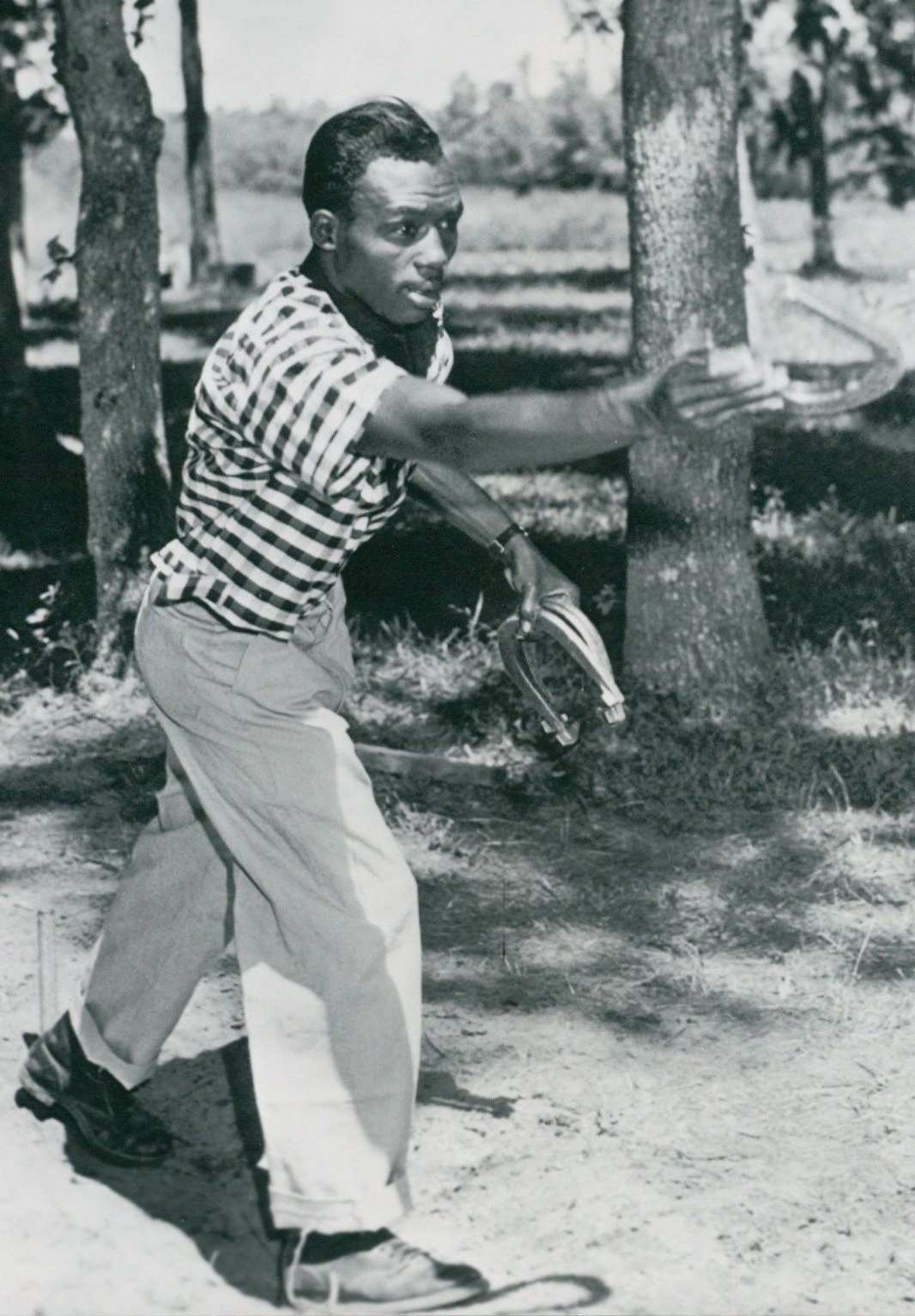
- Brown in 1958

Personal information
- Nickname: Old Bones
- Nationality: American
- Born: May 18, 1926 Baton Rouge, Louisiana
- Died: December 4, 1997 (aged 71) New Orleans
- Height: 5 ft 7 1/2 in (1.71 m)
- Weight: Lightweight

Boxing career
- Reach: 68 in (173 cm)
- Stance: Orthodox

Boxing record
- Total fights: 185
- Wins: 122
- Win by KO: 56
- Losses: 47
- Draws: 14
- No contests: 3

Joe Brown (May 18, 1926 – December 4, 1997) was an American professional boxer who won the Undisputed World lightweight title in 1956, making 11 successful defenses against 10 contenders before losing his crown to Carlos Ortiz in 1962. Brown was a classic boxer and a knockout puncher. Known as "The Creole Clouter" and "Old Bones", he was managed by Lou Viscusi and named The Ring's 'Fighter of the Year' for 1961. Brown was inducted into the Louisiana Sports Hall of Fame in 1978, the World Boxing Hall of Fame in 1987 and the International Boxing Hall of Fame in 1996.

== Early life and career ==
Born into poverty in the U.S. in Baton Rouge, Louisiana, on May 18, 1926, Brown started work as a grocery assistant, moved into carpentry and then embarked on his professional boxing career at the age of seventeen. He made his professional debut on January 15, 1943, at Victory Arena in New Orleans against Ringer Thompson, winning the four-round bout on points. Brown had another six fights, one of which was winning a four-round decision against Leonard Caesar on September 3, 1943, before he was drafted into the United States Navy during World War II. While in the Navy, Brown captured the All-Service Lightweight Championship before being honorably discharged from the Navy in 1945.

The resumption of Brown's career was initially disappointing and he frequently fought in undercard matches at Coliseum Arena or Pelican Stadium. One fight saw Brown suffering a third-round knock-out by Melvin Bartholomew in July 1945. After this fight, Brown did not fight again until January 1946, when he lost on a decision over five rounds to Leonard Caesar. Some reward came a mere seven days later when Brown out-pointed Johnny Monroe, but his career over the following three years was, at best, checkered.

The impetus for Brown's ultimate success seems to have been provided by a crushing defeat at the hands of the future National Boxing Association Welterweight Champion, Johnny Bratton, late in 1948, immediately followed by a short spell away from the ring. In 1949, Brown actually went unbeaten and, over the next seven years, he steadily climbed the Lightweight rankings, defeating along the way such notable boxers as Virgil Akins, Isaac Logart and Teddy 'Redtop' Davis.

These fruitful times were not, however, without their difficulties. The skilful Brown, standing a lanky 5 feet 7½ inches, with a long reach and solid left hand, came to be viewed as dangerous – too dangerous by some astute managers who frequently appeared to steer their charges away from meeting him. Several times, Brown quit in despair during his thirteen-year wait for a shot at the title.

== World Champion ==
Brown earned his chance for the Lightweight Championship of the World by out-pointing the reigning champion, Wallace 'Bud' Smith in a non-title bout held in Houston, Texas, in May 1956. Four months later, on August 24 and in front of his home crowd at the Municipal Auditorium in New Orleans, Brown defeated Smith by way of a split decision over fifteen hard-fought rounds. Confirmation of Brown's superiority came early in the following year when, defending the Championship for the first time, he knocked Smith out in eleven rounds.

Once Champion, Brown hoped that his newly acquired status would confer the riches and popular recognition denied to him for so long. Yet, as George Gainford (manager of the charismatic and handsome Sugar Ray Robinson) noted, the name 'Joe Brown' was hardly inspirational. Realising this, Brown attempted to solve his problems by billing himself as Joe 'Old Bones' Brown. The gimmick worked and he became something of a draw for the remainder of his Championship career.

In all, Brown made eleven successful defences of his title against ten boxers, and remained Champion for almost six years. After demolishing Smith, Brown beat Orlando Zulueta, Joey Lopes, Ralph Dupas, Kenny Lane, Johnny Busso, Paolo Rosi, Cisco Andrade, Bert Somodio and Dave Charnley (twice). Brown's re-match with Charnley, was named The Ring's Fight of the Year for 1961.

== Beyond glory ==
Brown fought on for another eight years, before retiring in 1970, at the age of 44 with a record of 121 wins, 47 losses and 14 draws with 56 KOs. In reflecting on the close of Brown's career, Henry Cooper has written that there came to be "little pride left in his performances" as he tried to compensate "for all the hungry years when he had been forced to fight for peanuts" (Cooper, 1990). Joe Brown later became a trainer in New Orleans, Louisiana, and led some fighters to become professionals, such as Gregory E. Haines, of Slidell, Louisiana.

Joe Brown died in New Orleans, on December 4, 1997.

== Professional boxing record ==
185 fights	122 wins	47 losses
By knockout	56	11
By decision	65	34
By disqualification	1	2
Draws	14	
No contests	2	

No.	Result	Record	Opponent	Type	Round	Date	Age	Location	Notes
185	Loss	122–47–14 (2)	Dave Oropeza	UD	10	Aug 24, 1970	44 years, 98 days	Riverside Ballroom Arena, Phoenix, Arizona, U.S.	
184	Win	122–46–14 (2)	Ramon Flores	UD	10	Apr 24, 1970	43 years, 341 days	Sports Center, Tucson, Arizona, U.S.	
183	Draw	121–46–14 (2)	Steve Freeman	PTS	10	Aug 12, 1969	43 years, 86 days	Houston, Texas, U.S.	
182	Loss	121–46–13 (2)	Chucho Garcia	TKO	9 (10)	Nov 6, 1968	42 years, 172 days	Sam's Sports Palace, Beaumont, Texas, U.S.	
181	Loss	121–45–13 (2)	Ricardo Medrano	UD	10	Sep 10, 1968	42 years, 115 days	Sam's Sports Palace, Beaumont, Texas, U.S.	
180	Loss	121–44–13 (2)	Chango Carmona	TKO	4 (10)	Jun 8, 1968	42 years, 21 days	Arena Mexico, Mexico City, Distrito Federal, Mexico	
179	Win	121–43–13 (2)	Vic Graffio	TKO	8 (10)	Apr 23, 1968	41 years, 341 days	Sam's Sports Palace, Beaumont, Texas, U.S.	
178	Win	120–43–13 (2)	Nat Jackson	TKO	6 (10)	Dec 13, 1967	41 years, 209 days	National Guard Armory, Pensacola, Florida, U.S.	
177	Win	119–43–13 (2)	Benito Juarez	UD	10	Sep 11, 1967	41 years, 116 days	Municipal Auditorium, New Orleans, Louisiana, U.S.	
176	Loss	118–43–13 (2)	Percy Pugh	UD	10	Aug 1, 1967	41 years, 75 days	Municipal Auditorium, New Orleans, Louisiana, U.S.	
175	Win	118–42–13 (2)	Joe Barrientes	MD	10	Jun 26, 1967	41 years, 39 days	Municipal Auditorium, New Orleans, Louisiana, U.S.	
174	Win	117–42–13 (2)	Blackie Zamora	TKO	8 (10)	Jun 16, 1967	41 years, 29 days	Teamsters Hall, Baton Rouge, Louisiana, U.S.	
173	Win	116–42–13 (2)	Rodwell LeKay	PTS	10	Aug 27, 1966	40 years, 101 days	Praça de Touros Monumental, Maputo, Mozambique	
172	Loss	115–42–13 (2)	Joe N'Gidi	PTS	10	Jul 30, 1966	40 years, 73 days	Orlando Stadium, Johannesburg, Gauteng, Union of South Africa	
171	Loss	115–41–13 (2)	Joe Ngidi	PTS	10	Jun 25, 1966	40 years, 38 days	Curries Fountain, Durban, KwaZulu-Natal, Union of South Africa	
170	Win	115–40–13 (2)	Enoch Nhlapo	PTS	10	Jun 4, 1966	40 years, 17 days	Orlando Stadium, Johannesburg, Gauteng, Union of South Africa	
169	Win	114–40–13 (2)	Josiah Nakedi	KO	9 (10)	May 14, 1966	39 years, 361 days	Bochabela Arena, Bloemfontein, Free State, Union of South Africa	
168	Draw	113–40–13 (2)	Jarmo Berglöf	MD	10	Apr 15, 1966	39 years, 332 days	Helsinki, Finland	
167	Loss	113–40–12 (2)	Bruno Arcari	PTS	10	Mar 11, 1966	39 years, 297 days	Roma, Lazio, Italy	
166	Loss	113–39–12 (2)	Frankie Narvaez	UD	10	Nov 13, 1965	39 years, 179 days	Hiram Bithorn Stadium, San Juan, Puerto Rico	
165	Loss	113–38–12 (2)	Mario Rossito	PTS	10	Oct 2, 1965	39 years, 137 days	Coliseo Humberto Perea, Barranquilla, Colombia	
164	Loss	113–37–12 (2)	Antonio Herrera	UD	10	Aug 26, 1965	39 years, 100 days	Cali, Colombia	
163	Win	113–36–12 (2)	Blackie Zamora	UD	10	Jun 30, 1965	39 years, 43 days	Memorial Coliseum, Corpus Christi, Texas, U.S.	
162	Loss	112–36–12 (2)	Joey Olguin	UD	10	May 18, 1965	39 years, 0 days	Memorial Auditorium, Sacramento, California, U.S.	
161	Loss	112–35–12 (2)	Vic Andreetti	TKO	5 (10)	Mar 9, 1965	38 years, 295 days	Royal Albert Hall, Kensington, London, England	
160	Loss	112–34–12 (2)	Joe N'Gidi	PTS	10	Feb 27, 1965	38 years, 285 days	Wembley Stadium, Johannesburg, Gauteng, Union of South Africa	
159	Win	112–33–12 (2)	Levi Madi	PTS	10	Feb 9, 1965	38 years, 267 days	Green Point Track, Cape Town, Western Cape, Union of South Africa	
158	Win	111–33–12 (2)	Joas Kangaroo Maoto	KO	6 (10)	Dec 19, 1964	38 years, 215 days	Orlando Stadium, Johannesburg, Gauteng, Union of South Africa	
157	Win	110–33–12 (2)	Levi Madi	PTS	10	Nov 21, 1964	38 years, 64 days	Orlando Stadium, Johannesburg, Gauteng, Union of South Africa	
156	Loss	109–33–12 (2)	Percy Hayles	PTS	10	Oct 3, 1964	38 years, 138 days	National Stadium, Kingston, Jamaica	
155	Win	109–32–12 (2)	Hector Diaz	KO	8 (10)	Sep 14, 1964	38 years, 119 days	City Auditorium, Omaha, Nebraska, U.S.	
154	Loss	108–32–12 (2)	Ricardo Medrano	DQ	10 (10)	Aug 25, 1964	38 years, 99 days	City Coliseum, Austin, Texas, U.S.	
153	Win	108–31–12 (2)	Esteban Santamaria	SD	10	Jun 21, 1964	38 years, 34 days	Arena de Colon, Colon City, Panama	
152	Loss	107–31–12 (2)	Paul Armstead	UD	10	May 25, 1964	38 years, 7 days	Kezar Pavilion, San Francisco, California, U.S.	
151	Win	107–30–12 (2)	Tony Perez	PTS	10	May 5, 1964	37 years, 353 days	San Jose, California, U.S.	
150	Loss	106–30–12 (2)	Paul Armstead	SD	10	Apr 28, 1964	37 years, 346 days	Memorial Auditorium, Sacramento, California, U.S.	
149	Loss	106–29–12 (2)	Manuel Gonzalez	UD	10	Apr 2, 1964	37 years, 320 days	Ector County Coliseum, Odessa, Texas, U.S.	
148	Loss	106–28–12 (2)	Carlos Morocho Hernández	KO	3 (10)	Nov 11, 1963	37 years, 177 days	Maracaibo, Venezuela	
147	Win	106–27–12 (2)	Pedro Galasso	TKO	5 (10)	Sep 14, 1963	37 years, 119 days	Auditório da TV-Excelsior, Río de Janeiro, Rio de Janeiro, Brazil	
146	Loss	105–27–12 (2)	Nicolino Locche	UD	10	Aug 10, 1963	37 years, 84 days	Estadio Luna Park, Buenos Aires, Distrito Federal, Argentina	
145	Loss	105–26–12 (2)	Alfredo Urbina	UD	10	Jun 22, 1963	37 years, 35 days	Arena Coliseo, Monterrey, Nuevo León, Mexico	
144	Win	105–25–12 (2)	Joey Lopes	RTD	7 (10)	May 21, 1963	37 years, 3 days	Memorial Auditorium, Sacramento, California, U.S.	
143	Win	104–25–12 (2)	Manuel Alvarez	KO	8 (10)	Apr 20, 1963	36 years, 337 days	Monterrey, Nuevo León, Mexico	
142	Loss	103–25–12 (2)	Dave Charnley	KO	6 (10)	Feb 25, 1963	36 years, 283 days	King's Hall, Belle Vue, Manchester, Lancashire, England	
141	Win	103–24–12 (2)	Tony Noriega	KO	6 (10)	Jan 22, 1963	36 years, 249 days	City Auditorium, Houston, Texas, U.S.	
140	Loss	102–24–12 (2)	Luis Molina	UD	10	Aug 24, 1962	36 years, 98 days	Municipal Stadium, San Jose, California, U.S.	
139	Loss	102–23–12 (2)	Carlos Ortiz	UD	15	Apr 21, 1962	35 years, 338 days	Convention Center, Las Vegas, Nevada, U.S.	Lost NYSAC, NBA, and The Ring lightweight titles
138	Win	102–22–12 (2)	Bert Somodio	UD	15	Oct 28, 1961	35 years, 163 days	Araneta Coliseum, Barangay Cubao, Quezon City, Metro Manila, Philippines	Retained NYSAC, NBA, and The Ring lightweight titles
137	Win	101–22–12 (2)	Dave Charnley	PTS	15	Apr 18, 1961	34 years, 335 days	Earls Court Arena, Kensington, London, England	Retained NYSAC, NBA, and The Ring lightweight titles
136	Win	100–22–12 (2)	Joey Parks	UD	10	Mar 7, 1961	34 years, 293 days	Houston, Texas, U.S.	
135	Loss	99–22–12 (2)	Giordano Campari	PTS	10	Dec 7, 1960	34 years, 203 days	Palazzo dello Sport (Pad. 3 Fiera), Milan, Lombardia, Italy	
134	Win	99–21–12 (2)	Cisco Andrade	UD	15	Oct 28, 1960	34 years, 163 days	Olympic Auditorium, Los Angeles, California, U.S.	Retained NYSAC, NBA, and The Ring lightweight titles
133	Win	98–21–12 (2)	Raymundo Torres	KO	4 (10)	Oct 4, 1960	34 years, 139 days	Sam Houston Coliseum, Houston, Texas, U.S.	
132	Win	97–21–12 (2)	Harlow Irwin	TKO	5 (10)	Aug 25, 1960	34 years, 99 days	Auditorium, Minneapolis, Minnesota, U.S.	
131	Loss	96–21–12 (2)	Ray Portilla	TKO	6 (10)	Mar 21, 1960	33 years, 308 days	Municipal Auditorium, San Antonio, Texas, U.S.	
130	Win	96–20–12 (2)	Joey Parks	UD	10	Dec 14, 1959	33 years, 210 days	Coliseum Arena, New Orleans, Louisiana, U.S.	
129	Win	95–20–12 (2)	Dave Charnley	TKO	6 (15)	Dec 2, 1959	33 years, 198 days	Sam Houston Coliseum, Houston, Texas, U.S.	Retained NYSAC, NBA, and The Ring lightweight titles
128	Draw	94–20–12 (2)	Joey Parks	PTS	10	Sep 25, 1959	33 years, 130 days	State Fair Coliseum, Albuquerque, New Mexico, U.S	
127	Win	94–20–11 (2)	Gale Kerwin	TKO	4 (10)	Sep 9, 1959	33 years, 114 days	Fairgrounds Coliseum, Columbus, Ohio, U.S.	
126	Win	93–20–11 (2)	Santiago Ramirez	KO	8 (10)	Aug 27, 1959	33 years, 101 days	Memorial Stadium, Baton Rouge, Louisiana, U.S.	
125	Win	92–20–11 (2)	Paolo Rosi	TKO	9 (15)	Jun 3, 1959	33 years, 16 days	Uline Arena, Washington, D.C., U.S.	Retained NYSAC, NBA, and The Ring lightweight titles
124	Win	91–20–11 (2)	Johnny Busso	UD	15	Feb 11, 1959	32 years, 269 days	Sam Houston Coliseum, Houston, Texas, U.S.	Retained NYSAC, NBA, and The Ring lightweight titles
123	Loss	90–20–11 (2)	Johnny Busso	UD	10	Nov 5, 1958	32 years, 171 days	Exhibition Hall, Miami Beach, Florida, U.S.	
122	Win	90–19–11 (2)	Kenny Lane	UD	15	Jul 23, 1958	32 years, 66 days	Sam Houston Coliseum, Houston, Texas, U.S.	Retained NYSAC, NBA, and The Ring lightweight titles
121	Win	89–19–11 (2)	Ralph Dupas	TKO	8 (15)	May 7, 1958	31 years, 354 days	Sam Houston Coliseum, Houston, Texas, U.S.	Retained NYSAC, NBA, and The Ring lightweight titles
120	Win	88–19–11 (2)	Orlando Echevarria	KO	1 (10)	Feb 26, 1958	31 years, 284 days	Palacio de Deportes, Havana, Cuba	
119	Win	87–19–11 (2)	Ernie Williams	TKO	5 (10)	Jan 24, 1958	31 years, 251 days	Capitol Arena, Washington, D.C., U.S.	
118	Win	86–19–11 (2)	Joey Lopes	TKO	11 (15)	Dec 4, 1957	31 years, 200 days	Chicago Stadium, Chicago, Illinois, U.S.	Retained NYSAC, NBA, and The Ring lightweight titles
117	Win	85–19–11 (2)	Kid Centella	UD	10	Nov 12, 1957	31 years, 178 days	Houston, Texas, U.S.	
116	Draw	84–19–11 (2)	Joey Lopes	MD	10	Aug 21, 1957	31 years, 95 days	Chicago Stadium, Chicago, Illinois, U.S.	
115	Win	84–19–10 (2)	Gilberto Holguin	UD	10	Jul 30, 1957	31 years, 73 days	Municipal Auditorium, San Antonio, Texas, U.S.	
114	Win	83–19–10 (2)	Orlando Zulueta	TKO	15 (15)	Jun 19, 1957	31 years, 32 days	Coliseum, Denver, Colorado, U.S.	Retained NYSAC, NBA, and The Ring lightweight titles
113	Win	82–19–10 (2)	Armand Savoie	SD	10	Mar 12, 1957	30 years, 298 days	Houston, Texas, U.S.	
112	Win	81–19–10 (2)	Wallace "Bud" Smith	TKO	11 (15)	Feb 13, 1957	30 years, 271 days	Auditorium, Miami Beach, Florida, U.S.	Retained NYSAC, NBA, and The Ring lightweight titles
111	Win	80–19–10 (2)	Wallace "Bud" Smith	SD	15	Aug 24, 1956	30 years, 98 days	Municipal Auditorium, New Orleans, Louisiana, U.S.	Won NYSAC, NBA, and The Ring lightweight titles
110	Win	79–19–10 (2)	Eddie Brant	TKO	3 (10)	Jun 6, 1956	30 years, 19 days	Sportatorium, Beaumont, Texas, U.S.	
109	Win	78–19–10 (2)	Wallace "Bud" Smith	UD	10	May 2, 1956	29 years, 350 days	Sam Houston Coliseum, Houston, Texas, U.S.	
108	Win	77–19–10 (2)	Arthur Persley	KO	9 (10)	Feb 6, 1956	29 years, 264 days	Coliseum Arena, New Orleans, Louisiana, U.S.	
107	Win	76–19–10 (2)	Ray Portilla	TKO	5 (?)	Dec 13, 1955	29 years, 209 days	Auditorium, Houston, Texas, U.S.	
106	Win	75–19–10 (2)	Ray Riojas	RTD	7 (10)	Nov 8, 1955	29 years, 174 days	City Auditorium, Houston, Texas, U.S.	
105	Win	74–19–10 (2)	Jimmy Hackney	UD	10	Oct 1, 1955	29 years, 136 days	Coliseum Arena, New Orleans, Louisiana, U.S.	
104	Loss	73–19–10 (2)	Arthur Persley	UD	12	Aug 1, 1955	29 years, 75 days	Coliseum Arena, New Orleans, Louisiana, U.S.	
103	Win	73–18–10 (2)	Junius West	KO	3 (10)	Jun 16, 1955	29 years, 29 days	Arena de Colon, Colon City, Panama	
102	Win	72–18–10 (2)	Tony Armenteros	PTS	10	Mar 20, 1955	28 years, 306 days	Arena de Colon, Colon City, Panama	
101	Win	71–18–10 (2)	Bobby Rosado	UD	10	Mar 6, 1955	28 years, 292 days	Arena de Colon, Colon City, Panama	
100	Win	70–18–10 (2)	Tito Despaigne	KO	4 (10)	Jan 30, 1955	28 years, 257 days	Arena de Colon, Colon City, Panama	
99	Win	69–18–10 (2)	Tony Armenteros	TKO	8 (10)	Jan 18, 1955	28 years, 245 days	Coliseum Arena, New Orleans, Louisiana, U.S.	
98	Loss	68–18–10 (2)	Tony Armenteros	PTS	6	Dec 29, 1954	28 years, 225 days	Dinner Key Auditorium, Coconut Grove, Florida, U.S.	
97	Loss	68–17–10 (2)	Carl Coates	SD	10	Sep 28, 1954	28 years, 133 days	Coliseum Arena, New Orleans, Louisiana, U.S.	
96	Win	68–16–10 (2)	Nat Jackson	KO	4 (10)	Aug 31, 1954	28 years, 105 days	Coliseum Arena, New Orleans, Louisiana, U.S.	
95	Win	67–16–10 (2)	Wilfrdo Brown	KO	4 (10)	Jul 25, 1954	28 years, 68 days	Arena de Colon, Colon City, Panama	
94	Win	66–16–10 (2)	Federico Plummer	TKO	9 (10)	Jun 20, 1954	27 years, 247 days	Arena de Colon, Colon City, Panama	
93	Win	65–16–10 (2)	Elvis Matthews	TKO	7 (10)	May 18, 1954	28 years, 0 days	Fort Homer Hesterly Armory, Tampa, Florida, U.S.	
92	Win	64–16–10 (2)	Little David	TKO	9 (10)	Apr 13, 1954	27 years, 330 days	Fort Homer Hesterly Armory, Tampa, Florida, U.S.	
91	Win	63–16–10 (2)	Jimmy Louis	UD	6	Apr 5, 1954	27 years, 322 days	Front Street Arena, Columbus, Ohio, U.S.	
90	Win	62–16–10 (2)	Isaac Logart	UD	10	Mar 24, 1954	27 years, 310 days	Auditorium, Miami Beach, Florida, U.S.	
89	Loss	61–16–10 (2)	Charlie Smith	DQ	6 (10)	Feb 8, 1954	27 years, 266 days	Arcadia Ballroom, Providence, Rhode Island, U.S.	Brown was disqualified for "not trying"
88	Win	61–15–10 (2)	Cliff Dyes	TKO	9 (10)	Dec 29, 1953	27 years, 225 days	Auditorium, Miami Beach, Florida, U.S.	
87	Win	60–15–10 (2)	Ernie Hall	TKO	3 (10)	Nov 10, 1953	27 years, 176 days	Fort Homer Hesterly Armory, Tampa, Florida, U.S.	
86	Draw	59–15–10 (2)	Luther Rawlings	PTS	10	Jun 9, 1953	27 years, 22 days	Auditorium, Miami Beach, Florida, U.S.	
85	Draw	59–15–9 (2)	Orlando Zulueta	PTS	10	Apr 22, 1953	26 years, 339 days	Coliseum, Baltimore, Maryland, U.S.	
84	Win	59–15–8 (2)	Joey Greenwood	UD	10	Jan 7, 1953	26 years, 234 days	Arena, Cleveland, Ohio, U.S.	
83	Win	58–15–8 (2)	Don Bowman	KO	1 (10)	Dec 10, 1952	26 years, 206 days	Arena, Cleveland, Ohio, U.S.	
82	Loss	57–15–8 (2)	George Araujo	KO	7 (10)	Oct 10, 1952	26 years, 145 days	St. Nicholas Arena, New York City, New York, U.S.	
81	Win	57–14–8 (2)	Jimmy Taylor	SD	10	Aug 22, 1952	26 years, 96 days	Coliseum Arena, New Orleans, Louisiana, U.S.	
80	Win	56–14–8 (2)	Marshall Clayton	RTD	8 (10)	Jul 18, 1952	26 years, 61 days	Coliseum Arena, New Orleans, Louisiana, U.S.	
79	Win	55–14–8 (2)	Melvin Bartholomew	PTS	10	Jul 11, 1952	26 years, 54 days	Coliseum Arena, New Orleans, Louisiana, U.S.	
78	Win	54–14–8 (2)	Jerry Turner	TKO	5 (10)	Jun 10, 1952	26 years, 23 days	Fort Homer Hesterly Armory, Tampa, Florida, U.S.	
77	Win	53–14–8 (2)	Calvin Smith	TKO	7 (10)	Mar 28, 1952	25 years, 315 days	Coliseum Arena, New Orleans, Louisiana, U.S.	
76	Win	52–14–8 (2)	Walter Haines	SD	10	Mar 14, 1952	25 years, 301 days	Coliseum Arena, New Orleans, Louisiana, U.S.	
75	Draw	51–14–8 (2)	Walter Haines	PTS	10	Feb 15, 1952	25 years, 273 days	Coliseum Arena, New Orleans, Louisiana, U.S.	
74	Draw	51–14–7 (2)	Walter Haines	PTS	6	Feb 4, 1952	25 years, 262 days	Miami Stadium, Miami, Florida, U.S.	
73	Loss	51–14–6 (2)	Virgil Akins	UD	10	Dec 6, 1951	25 years, 202 days	Kiel Auditorium, Saint Louis, Missouri, U.S.	
72	Win	51–13–6 (2)	Stonewall Jackson	TKO	5 (10)	Sep 28, 1951	25 years, 133 days	Coliseum Arena, New Orleans, Louisiana, U.S.	
71	Win	50–13–6 (2)	Tommy Campbell	KO	1 (10)	Aug 31, 1951	25 years, 105 days	Coliseum Arena, New Orleans, Louisiana, U.S.	
70	Win	49–13–6 (2)	Virgil Akins	PTS	10	Jul 6, 1951	25 years, 49 days	Coliseum Arena, New Orleans, Louisiana, U.S.	
69	Win	48–13–6 (2)	Virgil Akins	UD	10	May 25, 1951	25 years, 7 days	Coliseum Arena, New Orleans, Louisiana, U.S.	
68	Win	47–13–6 (2)	Honeychile Johnson	UD	10	May 11, 1951	24 years, 358 days	Coliseum Arena, New Orleans, Louisiana, U.S.	
67	Win	46–13–6 (2)	Lester Felton	SD	10	Apr 27, 1951	24 years, 344 days	Coliseum Arena, New Orleans, Louisiana, U.S.	
66	Win	45–13–6 (2)	Teddy Davis	UD	10	Apr 13, 1951	24 years, 330 days	Coliseum Arena, New Orleans, Louisiana, U.S.	
65	Win	44–13–6 (2)	Baby Neff Ortiz	KO	2 (10)	Mar 19, 1951	24 years, 305 days	Ocean Park Arena, Santa Monica, California, U.S.	
64	Loss	43–13–6 (2)	Tommy Campbell	MD	10	Feb 20, 1951	24 years, 278 days	Olympic Auditorium, Los Angeles, California, U.S.	
63	Win	43–12–6 (2)	Bernie Hall	KO	11 (12)	Dec 14, 1950	24 years, 210 days	Broken Hill, New South Wales, Australia	
62	NC	42–12–6 (2)	Irvin Steen	ND	10 (12)	Nov 27, 1950	24 years, 193 days	Sydney Stadium, Sydney, New South Wales, Australia	
61	Win	42–12–6 (1)	Charley Williams	KO	1 (12)	Oct 30, 1950	24 years, 165 days	Sydney Stadium, Sydney, New South Wales, Australia	
60	Win	41–12–6 (1)	Jack Hassen	KO	8 (12)	Sep 22, 1950	24 years, 127 days	West Melbourne Stadium, Melbourne, Victoria, Australia	
59	Loss	40–12–6 (1)	John L. Davis	UD	10	Jun 16, 1950	24 years, 29 days	Legion Stadium, Hollywood, California, U.S.	
58	Win	40–11–6 (1)	Dave Marsh	PTS	4	Feb 22, 1950	23 years, 280 days	Chicago Stadium, Chicago, Illinois, U.S.	
57	Win	39–11–6 (1)	Danny Womber	UD	8	Feb 6, 1950	23 years, 264 days	Chicago Stadium, Chicago, Illinois, U.S.	
56	Win	38–11–6 (1)	Milton Scott	TKO	2 (4)	Jan 20, 1950	23 years, 247 days	Chicago Stadium, Chicago, Illinois, U.S.	
55	Win	37–11–6 (1)	Isaac Jenkins	PTS	6	Dec 5, 1949	23 years, 201 days	Convention Hall, Philadelphia, Pennsylvania, U.S.	
54	Win	36–11–6 (1)	Charley Milan	UD	10	Jul 1, 1949	23 years, 44 days	Coliseum Arena, New Orleans, Louisiana, U.S.	
53	Win	35–11–6 (1)	Willie Russell	UD	10	Jun 6, 1949	23 years, 19 days	Parkway Arena, Cincinnati, Ohio, U.S.	
52	Win	34–11–6 (1)	Leroy Willis	PTS	10	May 27, 1949	23 years, 9 days	Coliseum Arena, New Orleans, Louisiana, U.S.	
51	Draw	33–11–6 (1)	John L.aBroi	PTS	10	May 23, 1949	23 years, 5 days	Marigold Gardens, Chicago, Illinois, U.S.	
50	Win	33–11–5 (1)	Hugh Sublett	UD	8	May 10, 1949	22 years, 357 days	Palais Royale, South Bend, Indiana, U.S.	
49	Win	32–11–5 (1)	Joe Sgro	PTS	8	Apr 25, 1949	22 years, 342 days	Marigold Gardens, Chicago, Illinois, U.S.	
48	Win	31–11–5 (1)	Luther Rawlings	PTS	10	Mar 28, 1949	22 years, 286 days	Marigold Gardens, Chicago, Illinois, U.S.	
47	Win	30–11–5 (1)	Booker T Ellis	PTS	6	Mar 22, 1949	22 years, 308 days	Auditorium, Saint Paul, Minnesota, U.S.	
46	Win	29–11–5 (1)	Loisel Isadore	KO	2 (10)	Jan 21, 1949	22 years, 248 days	Coliseum Arena, New Orleans, Louisiana, U.S.	
45	Loss	28–11–5 (1)	Johnny Bratton	KO	4 (10)	Dec 3, 1948	22 years, 199 days	Coliseum Arena, New Orleans, Louisiana, U.S.	
44	Win	28–10–5 (1)	Arthur Persley	PTS	8	Oct 31, 1948	22 years, 166 days	Coliseum Arena, New Orleans, Louisiana, U.S.	
43	Win	27–10–5 (1)	Frankie Cockrell	KO	5 (10)	Oct 26, 1948	22 years, 161 days	Municipal Auditorium, San Antonio, Texas, U.S.	
42	Loss	26–10–5 (1)	Freddie Dawson	UD	10	Oct 1, 1948	22 years, 136 days	Coliseum Arena, New Orleans, Louisiana, U.S.	
41	Draw	26–9–5 (1)	Luther Burgess	PTS	10	Jul 25, 1948	22 years, 68 days	Pelican Stadium, New Orleans, Louisiana, U.S.	
40	Loss	26–9–4 (1)	Bobby McQuillar	PTS	10	May 7, 1948	21 years, 355 days	Pelican Stadium, New Orleans, Louisiana, U.S.	
39	Draw	26–8–4 (1)	Bobby McQuillar	PTS	10	Feb 28, 1948	21 years, 286 days	Pelican Stadium, New Orleans, Louisiana, U.S.	
38	Win	26–8–3 (1)	Joey Bagnato	KO	1 (8)	Dec 15, 1947	21 years, 211 days	Maple Leaf Gardens, Toronto, Ontario, Canada	
37	Loss	25–8–3 (1)	Arthur King	SD	8	Nov 10, 1947	21 years, 176 days	Maple Leaf Gardens, Toronto, Ontario, Canada	
36	Win	25–7–3 (1)	Arthur King	UD	8	Oct 21, 1947	21 years, 156 days	Maple Leaf Gardens, Toronto, Ontario, Canada	
35	Win	24–7–3 (1)	Ernie Butler	KO	5 (10)	Oct 6, 1947	21 years, 141 days	Laurel Garden, Newark, New Jersey, U.S.	
34	Win	23–7–3 (1)	Danny Robinson	PTS	10	Sep 24, 1947	21 years, 129 days	Jersey City Gardens, Jersey City, New Jersey, U.S.	
33	Win	22–7–3 (1)	Danny Webb	PTS	10	Aug 6, 1947	21 years, 80 days	Exchange Stadium, Montreal, Quebec, Canada	
32	Win	21–7–3 (1)	Freddie Latson	PTS	6	Jul 23, 1947	21 years, 66 days	Crystal Arena, Norwalk, Connecticut, U.S.	
31	Win	20–7–3 (1)	Walter Stevens	PTS	6	Jul 14, 1947	21 years, 57 days	Meadowbrook Bowl, Newark, New Jersey, U.S.	
30	Win	19–7–3 (1)	Melvin Bartholomew	UD	10	Jul 4, 1947	21 years, 47 days	Pelican Stadium, New Orleans, Louisiana, U.S.	
29	Win	18–7–3 (1)	Leonard Caesar	DQ	10 (10)	May 18, 1947	21 years, 0 days	Coliseum Arena, New Orleans, Louisiana, U.S.	
28	Loss	17–7–3 (1)	Sandy Saddler	RTD	2 (10)	May 2, 1947	20 years, 349 days	Coliseum Arena, New Orleans, Louisiana, U.S.	
27	Win	17–6–3 (1)	Jimmy Carter	PTS	10	Apr 18, 1947	20 years, 335 days	Coliseum Arena, New Orleans, Louisiana, U.S.	
26	Loss	16–6–3 (1)	Melvin Bartholomew	UD	10	Mar 28, 1947	20 years, 314 days	Coliseum Arena, New Orleans, Louisiana, U.S.	
25	Draw	16–5–3 (1)	Buster Tyler	PTS	10	Mar 7, 1947	20 years, 293 days	Coliseum Arena, New Orleans, Louisiana, U.S.	
24	Win	16–5–2 (1)	Janius West	PTS	10	Dec 20, 1946	20 years, 216 days	Coliseum Arena, New Orleans, Louisiana, U.S.	
23	Win	15–5–2 (1)	Bob Weatherly	PTS	8	Oct 18, 1946	20 years, 153 days	Pelican Stadium, New Orleans, Louisiana, U.S.	
22	Loss	14–5–2 (1)	Buster Tyler	PTS	10	Jul 26, 1946	20 years, 69 days	Pelican Stadium, New Orleans, Louisiana, U.S.	
21	Win	14–4–2 (1)	Midget Jones	PTS	8	Jun 28, 1946	20 years, 41 days	Pelican Stadium, New Orleans, Louisiana, U.S.	
20	Win	13–4–2 (1)	Arthur Ross	KO	2 (6)	May 3, 1946	19 years, 350 days	Coliseum Arena, New Orleans, Louisiana, U.S.	
19	Win	12–4–2 (1)	Francis Adams	PTS	6	Apr 5, 1946	19 years, 322 days	Coliseum Arena, New Orleans, Louisiana, U.S.	
18	Win	11–4–2 (1)	Leonard Caesar	PTS	8	Mar 29, 1946	19 years, 315 days	Coliseum Arena, New Orleans, Louisiana, U.S.	
17	Draw	10–4–2 (1)	Leonard Caesar	PTS	6	Mar 22, 1946	19 years, 308 days	Coliseum Arena, New Orleans, Louisiana, U.S.	
16	Win	10–4–1 (1)	Johnny Monroe	PTS	6	Jan 20, 1946	19 years, 247 days	Coliseum Arena, New Orleans, Louisiana, U.S.	
15	Loss	9–4–1 (1)	Leonard Caesar	PTS	5	Jan 13, 1946	19 years, 240 days	Coliseum Arena, New Orleans, Louisiana, U.S.	
14	Loss	9–3–1 (1)	Melvin Bartholomew	KO	3 (6)	Jul 9, 1945	19 years, 52 days	Coliseum Arena, New Orleans, Louisiana, U.S.	
13	Win	9–2–1 (1)	Leonard Caesar	PTS	4	Sep 3, 1943	17 years, 108 days	Coliseum Arena, New Orleans, Louisiana, U.S.	
12	Win	8–2–1 (1)	Leonard Caesar	PTS	4	Aug 1, 1943	17 years, 75 days	Pelican Stadium, New Orleans, Louisiana, U.S.	
11	Win	7–2–1 (1)	Charles Wright	KO	3 (4)	Apr 19, 1943	16 years, 336 days	Pelican Stadium, New Orleans, Louisiana, U.S.	
10	Win	6–2–1 (1)	Richard Germaine	TKO	4 (4)	Apr 2, 1943	16 years, 319 days	Victory Arena, New Orleans, Louisiana, U.S.	
9	Loss	5–2–1 (1)	Midget Jones	PTS	6	Mar 26, 1943	16 years, 312 days	Victory Arena, New Orleans, Louisiana, U.S.	
8	Win	5–1–1 (1)	Kenneth Hurst	PTS	6	Feb 19, 1943	16 years, 277 days	Victory Arena, New Orleans, Louisiana, U.S.	
7	Win	4–1–1 (1)	Richard Germaine	KO	3 (4)	Jan 24, 1943	16 years, 251 days	Victory Arena, New Orleans, Louisiana, U.S.	
6	Win	3–1–1 (1)	Ringer Thompson	PTS	4	Jan 15, 1943	16 years, 242 days	Victory Arena, New Orleans, Louisiana, U.S.	
5	Win	2–1–1 (1)	Ringer Thompson	PTS	6	Dec 13, 1942	16 years, 209 days	Victory Arena, New Orleans, Louisiana, U.S.	
4	Win	1–1–1 (1)	Kid Alphonse	KO	3 (6)	Jul 27, 1942	16 years, 70 days	Legion Field, Baton Rouge, Louisiana, U.S.	
3	Loss	0–1–1 (1)	John L. Robertson	KO	1 (4)	Dec 5, 1941	15 years, 201 days	Coliseum Arena, New Orleans, Louisiana, U.S.	
2	Draw	0–0–1 (1)	George Bradford	PTS	4	Oct 6, 1941	15 years, 141 days	Athletic Club, Baton Rouge, Louisiana, U.S.	
1	ND	0–0 (1)	Ringer Thompson	ND	? (6)	Sep 12, 1941	15 years, 117 days	Catholic High School Gym, Baton Rouge, Louisiana, U.S.	

== Titles in boxing ==
=== Major world titles ===
- NYSAC lightweight champion (135 lbs)
- NBA (WBA) lightweight champion (135 lbs)

=== The Ring magazine titles ===
- The Ring lightweight champion (135 lbs)

=== Undisputed titles ===
- Undisputed lightweight champion

== See also ==
- Lineal championship
- List of lightweight boxing champions

Sporting positions
World boxing titles
Preceded by Wallace Smith	NYSAC lightweight champion August 24, 1956 – April 21, 1962	Succeeded by Carlos Ortiz
Preceded by Wallace Smith	NBA lightweight champion August 24, 1956 – April 21, 1962	Succeeded by Carlos Ortiz
Preceded by Wallace Smith	The Ring lightweight champion August 24, 1956 – April 21, 1962	Succeeded by Carlos Ortiz
Preceded by Wallace Smith	Undisputed lightweight champion August 24, 1956 – April 21, 1962	Succeeded by Carlos Ortiz
