= Hocine Khalfi =

Professional boxer (1928–2011)

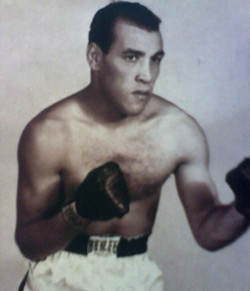

Personal information
- Nicknames: "The Casbah Kid", "Butcher from Oran"
- Born: Hocine Khalfi; 7 January 1928 Oran, Algeria
- Died: 27 August 2011 (aged 83)
- Height: 1.70 m (5 ft 7 in)
- Weight: Lightweight

Boxing career
- Stance: Orthodox

Boxing record
- Total fights: 76
- Wins: 47
- Win by KO: 16
- Losses: 22
- Draws: 7

Hocine Khalfi (January 7, 1928 – August 27, 2011) (commonly misspelled, "Hoacine") was an Algerian-French boxer from Oran, Algeria. He was orphaned at the age of seven and raised by his aunt. Khalfi, who started boxing at the age of 17, quickly rose through the ranks. He was the featherweight champion of Algeria in 1945. Named "Golden Glove," Hocine found himself in Paris where he began to deliver his first professional battles; He was only 18 years old. Over his 9-year career (1948–1957), Khalfi scored 16 knockouts. His final record was 47-22-7.

== Professional career ==
Khalfi is best known for his May 1954 defeat of Sandy Saddler in major upset bout. During his career he fought notable fighters such as Cisco Andrade, Ralph Dupas, and Fernando Silva. On March 9, 1956, he was the main event at Madison Square Garden against Ludwig Lightburn. Preoccupied by the birth of his twin daughters, Lallia and Myriam, Khalfi lost the bout. The following day, the New York Journal said that it was the first time in boxing history that a main event was lost due to the birth of twins; The title of the article read: "Khalfi's Pilot Has Twin Alibi".

== Television / film appearances ==
During his attendance of a taping of The Ed Sullivan Show, he was pulled on stage by Ed Sullivan, who was a big boxing fan.

The 1954 edition of Boxing and Wrestling Magazine, of which Khalfi appeared the cover and had a featured article, was shown in the movie Shutter Island, starring Leonardo DiCaprio.

== After boxing ==
Khalfi retired from boxing in 1957, aged 29, due to a recurrent eye ulcer that he sustained in one of his fights. He later became a chef working at such notable places as the Waldorf-Astoria Hotel, Beverly Hills Hotel, and Ambassador Hotel (Los Angeles). He lived in Los Angeles, California before moving to France in March, 2008; and later moving back to Algeria.

Khalfi died on August 27, 2011, from pancreatic cancer, aged 83, in his hometown of Oran, Algeria leaving behind 3 daughters (Lallia, Myriam, and Nadia), 6 grandchildren, and 8 great-grandchildren.
