= Ralph Dupas =

American boxer (1935–2008)

Personal information
- Nickname: The Cajun Ghost
- Nationality: American
- Born: October 14, 1935 New Orleans, Louisiana, U.S.
- Died: January 25, 2008 (aged 72)
- Weight: Lightweight; Welterweight; Junior middleweight

Boxing career
- Stance: Orthodox

Boxing record
- Total fights: 135
- Wins: 106
- Win by KO: 19
- Losses: 23
- Draws: 6

Ralph Dupas (October 14, 1935 – January 25, 2008) was an American boxer from New Orleans who reigned as the World Boxing Association and World Boxing Council world junior middleweight champion in 1963.

== Early boxing career ==
Dupas was the second of eleven children of a New Orleans fisherman, Peter Dupas. He became a professional boxer in 1950 at the age of 14. Trainer Angelo Dundee saw Dupas fight and took him to Miami to train him.

Dupas became a ranked contender in the lightweight division when he defeated Armand Savoie in 1953. By 1955, after beating a variety of top fighters such as Paddy DeMarco and Kenny Lane, Dupas was the top-ranked lightweight in the world. In May 1957 Dupas challenged Joe Brown for the lightweight title, but lost by an eighth-round knockout. Earlier in 1957, Dupas had filed a lawsuit to establish his race, with Dupas contending that he was white, and therefore permitted to box white opponents in then-segregated Louisiana. Judge Rene Viosca ruled in favor of the claim by Dupas.

Dupas moved up to the welterweight division. He defeated future middleweight champion Joey Giardello in 1961, but lost a 1962 welterweight title shot to Emile Griffith. In 1963, Sugar Ray Robinson beat him by a controversial decision.

== Championship ==
Another championship fight for Dupas materialized in the light middleweight division. Lineal Light Middleweight Champion Denny Moyer came to New Orleans on April 29, 1963, and Dupas won the title with a fifteen-round unanimous decision. He lost the title in September of that year to Italian Sandro Mazzinghi by a thirteen-round knockout. After that match, Emile Griffith once again knocked him out in a non-title bout.

== Post-championship career ==
Dupas briefly retired in 1964 and worked as a card dealer in Las Vegas. He returned to the ring in 1966 and had little success. He retired for good after five fights that year.

== After boxing ==
After he retired, Dupas began to exhibit signs of dementia pugilistica. His brother Tony, also a former fighter, moved Ralph from Las Vegas back to New Orleans and put him in a nursing home.

== Professional boxing record ==
| 135 fights | 106 wins | 23 losses |
|---|---|---|
| By knockout | 19 | 7 |
| By decision | 86 | 15 |
| By disqualification | 1 | 1 |
| Draws | 6 | |

| No. | Result | Record | Opponent | Type | Round | Date | Age | Location | Notes |
|---|---|---|---|---|---|---|---|---|---|
| 135 | Loss | 106–23–6 | Joe Clark | TKO | 8 (10) | Sep 8, 1966 | 30 years, 329 days | Fremont Hotel, Las Vegas, Nevada, U.S. | |
| 134 | Win | 106–22–6 | Joey Limas | RTD | 4 (10) | Aug 4, 1966 | 30 years, 294 days | Fremont Hotel, Las Vegas, Nevada, U.S. | |
| 133 | Win | 105–22–6 | Ed McGruder | SD | 10 | Jul 7, 1966 | 30 years, 266 days | Fremont Hotel, Las Vegas, Nevada, U.S. | |
| 132 | Win | 104–22–6 | Polo Corona | UD | 10 | Jun 9, 1966 | 30 years, 238 days | Fremont Hotel, Las Vegas, Nevada, U.S. | |
| 131 | Win | 103–22–6 | Steve Perez | KO | 6 (10) | May 26, 1966 | 30 years, 224 days | Fremont Hotel, Las Vegas, Nevada, U.S. | |
| 130 | Loss | 102–22–6 | Willie Ludick | KO | 2 (10) | Sep 12, 1964 | 28 years, 334 days | Ellis Park Tennis Stadium, Johannesburg, South Africa | |
| 129 | Win | 102–21–6 | Peter Schmidt | UD | 10 | Jun 18, 1964 | 28 years, 248 days | Municipal Auditorium, New Orleans, Louisiana, U.S. | |
| 128 | Loss | 101–21–6 | Emile Griffith | KO | 3 (12) | Feb 10, 1964 | 28 years, 119 days | Sydney Stadium, Sydney, New South Wales, Australia | |
| 127 | Loss | 101–20–6 | Sandro Mazzinghi | TKO | 13 (15) | Dec 2, 1963 | 28 years, 49 days | Sydney Stadium, Sydney, New South Wales, Australia | For WBA and WBC junior middleweight titles |
| 126 | Win | 101–19–6 | Gary Cowburn | PTS | 12 | Oct 18, 1963 | 28 years, 4 days | Festival Hall, Brisbane, Queensland, Australia | |
| 125 | Loss | 100–19–6 | Sandro Mazzinghi | TKO | 9 (15) | Sep 7, 1963 | 27 years, 328 days | Velodromo Vigorelli, Milan, Lombardia, Italy | Lost WBA and WBC junior middleweight titles |
| 124 | Win | 100–18–6 | Denny Moyer | UD | 15 | Jun 17, 1963 | 27 years, 246 days | Civic Center, Baltimore, Maryland, U.S. | Retained WBA and WBC junior middleweight titles |
| 123 | Win | 99–18–6 | Denny Moyer | SD | 15 | Apr 29, 1963 | 27 years, 197 days | Municipal Auditorium, New Orleans, Louisiana, U.S. | Won WBA and WBC junior middleweight titles |
| 122 | Loss | 98–18–6 | Sugar Ray Robinson | SD | 10 | Jan 30, 1963 | 27 years, 108 days | Convention Center, Miami Beach, Florida, U.S. | |
| 121 | Win | 98–17–6 | Rocky Randell | TKO | 6 (10) | Jan 14, 1963 | 27 years, 92 days | Westside Sport Center, Harvey, Louisiana, U.S. | |
| 120 | Win | 97–17–6 | Henry Watson | UD | 10 | Dec 4, 1962 | 27 years, 51 days | Sports Arena, Amarillo, Texas, U.S. | |
| 119 | Win | 96–17–6 | Earl Citizen | TKO | 4 (10) | Oct 2, 1962 | 26 years, 353 days | Sportatorium, Beaumont, Texas, U.S. | |
| 118 | Loss | 95–17–6 | Brian Curvis | DQ | 6 (12) | Sep 11, 1962 | 26 years, 332 days | Empire Pool, Wembley, London, England, U.K. | Dupas was disqualified for repeated holding as well as shoving Curvis |
| 117 | Win | 95–16–6 | Henry Watson | UD | 10 | Aug 21, 1962 | 26 years, 311 days | Sportatorium, Beaumont, Texas, U.S. | |
| 116 | Loss | 94–16–6 | Emile Griffith | UD | 15 | Jul 13, 1962 | 26 years, 272 days | Convention Center, Las Vegas, Nevada, U.S. | For NYSAC, NBA, and The Ring welterweight titles |
| 115 | Win | 94–15–6 | Frankie Ramirez | UD | 10 | Apr 23, 1962 | 26 years, 191 days | Sports Arena, Los Angeles, California, U.S. | |
| 114 | Win | 93–15–6 | Charley Scott | UD | 10 | Feb 3, 1962 | 26 years, 112 days | Madison Square Garden, New York City, New York, U.S. | |
| 113 | Win | 92–15–6 | Virgil Akins | UD | 10 | Dec 27, 1961 | 26 years, 74 days | Bayfront Park Auditorium, Miami, Florida, U.S. | |
| 112 | Win | 91–15–6 | Hilario Morales | UD | 10 | Nov 13, 1961 | 26 years, 30 days | Municipal Auditorium, New Orleans, Louisiana, U.S. | |
| 111 | Win | 90–15–6 | Del Flanagan | UD | 10 | Oct 9, 1961 | 25 years, 360 days | Municipal Auditorium, New Orleans, Louisiana, U.S. | |
| 110 | Win | 89–15–6 | Guy Sumlin | MD | 12 | Jul 24, 1961 | 25 years, 283 days | Mobile, Alabama, U.S. | Retained Southern welterweight title |
| 109 | Win | 88–15–6 | Guy Sumlin | UD | 12 | Jun 12, 1961 | 25 years, 241 days | Municipal Auditorium, New Orleans, Louisiana, U.S. | Won vacant Southern welterweight title |
| 108 | Loss | 87–15–6 | Guy Sumlin | SD | 10 | Apr 7, 1961 | 25 years, 175 days | Mobile, Alabama, U.S. | |
| 107 | Win | 87–14–6 | Joey Giardello | UD | 10 | Mar 6, 1961 | 25 years, 143 days | Municipal Auditorium, New Orleans, Louisiana, U.S. | |
| 106 | Win | 86–14–6 | Antonio Marcilla | DQ | 9 (10) | Jan 16, 1961 | 25 years, 94 days | St. Mary's Recreation Center, New Orleans, Louisiana, U.S. | Marcilla was disqualified for butting |
| 105 | Win | 85–14–6 | Gale Kerwin | TKO | 7 (10) | Nov 2, 1960 | 25 years, 19 days | Municipal Auditorium, New Orleans, Louisiana, U.S. | |
| 104 | Win | 84–14–6 | Charley Scott | PTS | 12 | Sep 5, 1960 | 24 years, 327 days | Sydney Stadium, Sydney, New South Wales, Australia | |
| 103 | Win | 83–14–6 | Charley Scott | PTS | 12 | Aug 1, 1960 | 24 years, 292 days | Sydney Stadium, Sydney, New South Wales, Australia | |
| 102 | Win | 82–14–6 | Eddie Jordan | UD | 10 | Jun 27, 1960 | 24 years, 257 days | Municipal Auditorium, New Orleans, Louisiana, U.S. | |
| 101 | Win | 81–14–6 | Rudell Stitch | PTS | 12 | May 2, 1960 | 24 years, 201 days | Sydney Stadium, Sydney, New South Wales, Australia | |
| 100 | Win | 80–14–6 | George Barnes | PTS | 12 | Apr 11, 1960 | 24 years, 180 days | Sydney Stadium, Sydney, New South Wales, Australia | |
| 99 | Loss | 79–14–6 | Florentino Fernández | MD | 10 | Mar 23, 1960 | 24 years, 161 days | Auditorium, Miami Beach, Florida, U.S. | |
| 98 | Win | 79–13–6 | Kenny Lane | UD | 10 | Jan 13, 1960 | 24 years, 91 days | Fort Whiting Armory, Mobile, Alabama, U.S. | |
| 97 | Win | 78–13–6 | Pat Lowry | TKO | 6 (10) | Nov 16, 1959 | 24 years, 33 days | Municipal Auditorium, New Orleans, Louisiana, U.S. | |
| 96 | Loss | 77–13–6 | Rudell Stitch | UD | 10 | Oct 7, 1959 | 23 years, 358 days | Freedom Hall, Louisville, Kentucky, U.S. | |
| 95 | Win | 77–12–6 | Mel Barker | UD | 12 | Aug 24, 1959 | 23 years, 314 days | Municipal Auditorium, New Orleans, Louisiana, U.S. | |
| 94 | Win | 76–12–6 | Frankie Ryff | UD | 10 | Jul 20, 1959 | 23 years, 279 days | Municipal Auditorium, New Orleans, Louisiana, U.S. | |
| 93 | Loss | 75–12–6 | Charley Scott | SD | 10 | May 13, 1959 | 23 years, 211 days | Chicago Stadium, Chicago, Illinois, U.S. | |
| 92 | Win | 75–11–6 | Gerald Gray | UD | 10 | Mar 14, 1959 | 23 years, 151 days | Sabina Park, Kingston, Jamaica | |
| 91 | Loss | 74–11–6 | Del Flanagan | SD | 10 | Feb 4, 1959 | 23 years, 113 days | Auditorium, Saint Paul, Minnesota, U.S. | |
| 90 | Loss | 74–10–6 | Garnet Hart | SD | 10 | Dec 26, 1958 | 23 years, 73 days | Auditorium, Miami Beach, Florida, U.S. | |
| 89 | Win | 74–9–6 | Guy Sumlin | UD | 10 | Nov 10, 1958 | 23 years, 27 days | Mobile, Alabama, U.S. | |
| 88 | Win | 73–9–6 | Gil Turner | UD | 10 | Oct 15, 1958 | 23 years, 1 day | Forum, Montreal, Quebec, Canada | |
| 87 | Win | 72–9–6 | Ray Lancaster | UD | 10 | Sep 29, 1958 | 22 years, 350 days | Coliseum Arena, New Orleans, Louisiana, U.S. | |
| 86 | Win | 71–9–6 | Johnny Gorman | UD | 10 | Sep 8, 1958 | 22 years, 329 days | Coliseum Arena, New Orleans, Louisiana, U.S. | |
| 85 | Loss | 70–9–6 | Joe Brown | TKO | 8 (15) | May 7, 1958 | 22 years, 205 days | Sam Houston Coliseum, Houston, Texas, U.S. | For NYSAC, NBA, and The Ring lightweight titles |
| 84 | Win | 70–8–6 | Ramon Fuentes | UD | 10 | Apr 7, 1958 | 22 years, 175 days | Municipal Auditorium, New Orleans, Louisiana, U.S. | |
| 83 | Win | 69–8–6 | Gaspar Ortega | MD | 10 | Feb 5, 1958 | 22 years, 114 days | Municipal Auditorium, Norfolk, Virginia, U.S. | |
| 82 | Win | 68–8–6 | Mickey Crawford | UD | 10 | Nov 25, 1957 | 22 years, 42 days | Coliseum Arena, New Orleans, Louisiana, U.S. | |
| 81 | Win | 67–8–6 | Joe Miceli | UD | 10 | Sep 18, 1957 | 21 years, 339 days | Coliseum Arena, New Orleans, Louisiana, U.S. | |
| 80 | Win | 66–8–6 | Johnny Busso | UD | 10 | Aug 30, 1957 | 21 years, 320 days | Auditorium, Miami Beach, Florida, U.S. | |
| 79 | Draw | 65–8–6 | Séraphin Ferrer | PTS | 10 | May 31, 1957 | 21 years, 229 days | Palais des Sports, Paris, Paris, France | |
| 78 | Win | 65–8–5 | Vince Martinez | UD | 10 | Apr 8, 1957 | 21 years, 176 days | Pelican Stadium, New Orleans, Louisiana, U.S. | |
| 77 | Win | 64–8–5 | Ray Portilla | UD | 10 | Mar 4, 1957 | 21 years, 141 days | Coliseum Arena, New Orleans, Louisiana, U.S. | |
| 76 | Win | 63–8–5 | Pat Mallane | TKO | 5 (10) | Feb 11, 1957 | 21 years, 120 days | Coliseum Arena, New Orleans, Louisiana, U.S. | |
| 75 | Win | 62–8–5 | Siegfried Burrow | UD | 10 | Nov 26, 1956 | 21 years, 43 days | Municipal Auditorium, New Orleans, Louisiana, U.S. | |
| 74 | Win | 61–8–5 | Hoacine Khalfi | TKO | 8 (10) | Sep 24, 1956 | 20 years, 346 days | Coliseum Arena, New Orleans, Louisiana, U.S. | |
| 73 | Win | 60–8–5 | Alex Vargas | KO | 5 (10) | Sep 10, 1956 | 20 years, 332 days | Coliseum Arena, New Orleans, Louisiana, U.S. | |
| 72 | Loss | 59–8–5 | Kenny Lane | SD | 10 | Jul 9, 1956 | 20 years, 269 days | Pelican Stadium, New Orleans, Louisiana, U.S. | |
| 71 | Win | 59–7–5 | Johnny DiGilio | UD | 10 | May 1, 1956 | 20 years, 200 days | Auditorium, Miami Beach, Florida, U.S. | |
| 70 | Win | 58–7–5 | Hoacine Khalfi | SD | 10 | Feb 20, 1956 | 20 years, 129 days | Coliseum Arena, New Orleans, Louisiana, U.S. | |
| 69 | Loss | 57–7–5 | Ludwig Lightburn | UD | 10 | Dec 16, 1955 | 20 years, 63 days | Madison Square Garden, New York City, New York, U.S. | |
| 68 | Win | 57–6–5 | Mickey Northrup | UD | 10 | Sep 17, 1955 | 19 years, 338 days | Legion Stadium, Hollywood, California, U.S. | |
| 67 | Draw | 56–6–5 | Leonard Gaines | PTS | 10 | Sep 1, 1955 | 19 years, 322 days | Auditorium, Oakland, California, U.S. | |
| 66 | Win | 56–6–4 | Paddy DeMarco | UD | 10 | Jul 11, 1955 | 19 years, 270 days | Pelican Stadium, New Orleans, Louisiana, U.S. | |
| 65 | Win | 55–6–4 | Frankie Ryff | SD | 10 | May 17, 1955 | 19 years, 215 days | Municipal Auditorium, New Orleans, Louisiana, U.S. | |
| 64 | Win | 54–6–4 | Bobby Bickle | UD | 10 | Mar 28, 1955 | 19 years, 165 days | Coliseum Arena, New Orleans, Louisiana, U.S. | |
| 63 | Win | 53–6–4 | Kenny Lane | SD | 10 | Mar 14, 1955 | 19 years, 151 days | Coliseum Arena, New Orleans, Louisiana, U.S. | |
| 62 | Win | 52–6–4 | John Obed Howard | UD | 10 | Feb 8, 1955 | 19 years, 117 days | Coliseum Arena, New Orleans, Louisiana, U.S. | |
| 61 | Win | 51–6–4 | Cisco Andrade | UD | 10 | Jan 1, 1955 | 19 years, 79 days | Municipal Auditorium, New Orleans, Louisiana, U.S. | |
| 60 | Win | 50–6–4 | Carlos Chávez | TKO | 7 (10) | Nov 1, 1954 | 19 years, 18 days | Coliseum Arena, New Orleans, Louisiana, U.S. | |
| 59 | Loss | 49–6–4 | Frankie Ryff | UD | 8 | Sep 13, 1954 | 18 years, 334 days | Eastern Parkway Arena, New York City, New York, U.S. | |
| 58 | Win | 49–5–4 | Bobby Woods | UD | 10 | Aug 3, 1954 | 18 years, 293 days | Municipal Auditorium, New Orleans, Louisiana, U.S. | |
| 57 | Win | 48–5–4 | Armand Savoie | SD | 10 | Jul 20, 1954 | 18 years, 279 days | Municipal Auditorium, New Orleans, Louisiana, U.S. | |
| 56 | Win | 47–5–4 | Freddie Herman | UD | 10 | May 24, 1954 | 18 years, 222 days | Coliseum Arena, New Orleans, Louisiana, U.S. | |
| 55 | Win | 46–5–4 | Dennis Pat Brady | UD | 10 | Apr 28, 1954 | 18 years, 196 days | Coliseum Arena, New Orleans, Louisiana, U.S. | |
| 54 | Win | 45–5–4 | Santiago Esteban | MD | 10 | Mar 22, 1954 | 18 years, 159 days | Coliseum Arena, New Orleans, Louisiana, U.S. | |
| 53 | Loss | 44–5–4 | Paddy DeMarco | SD | 10 | Jan 2, 1954 | 18 years, 80 days | Municipal Auditorium, New Orleans, Louisiana, U.S. | |
| 52 | Draw | 44–4–4 | Philip Kim | MD | 8 | Nov 9, 1953 | 18 years, 26 days | Coliseum Arena, New Orleans, Louisiana, U.S. | |
| 51 | Win | 44–4–3 | Johnny Gonsalves | UD | 8 | Sep 21, 1953 | 17 years, 342 days | Pelican Stadium, New Orleans, Louisiana, U.S. | |
| 50 | Win | 43–4–3 | Rocky Brisebois | UD | 8 | Sep 14, 1953 | 17 years, 335 days | Pelican Stadium, New Orleans, Louisiana, U.S. | |
| 49 | Win | 42–4–3 | Brian Kelly | MD | 8 | Aug 24, 1953 | 17 years, 314 days | Municipal Auditorium, New Orleans, Louisiana, U.S. | |
| 48 | Loss | 41–4–3 | Brian Kelly | SD | 8 | Jul 21, 1953 | 17 years, 280 days | Auditorium, Miami Beach, Florida, U.S. | |
| 47 | Win | 41–3–3 | Armand Savoie | UD | 8 | Jun 29, 1953 | 17 years, 258 days | Municipal Auditorium, New Orleans, Louisiana, U.S. | |
| 46 | Win | 40–3–3 | Harold Jones | UD | 8 | Jun 15, 1953 | 17 years, 244 days | Pelican Stadium, New Orleans, Louisiana, U.S. | |
| 45 | Win | 39–3–3 | Tote Martinez | KO | 6 (8) | Jun 1, 1953 | 17 years, 230 days | Coliseum Arena, New Orleans, Louisiana, U.S. | |
| 44 | Win | 38–3–3 | John Obed Howard | UD | 8 | Apr 20, 1953 | 17 years, 188 days | Coliseum Arena, New Orleans, Louisiana, U.S. | |
| 43 | Win | 37–3–3 | Giuseppe Fusaro | UD | 8 | Apr 6, 1953 | 17 years, 174 days | Coliseum Arena, New Orleans, Louisiana, U.S. | |
| 42 | Win | 36–3–3 | Baby Vásquez | MD | 10 | Mar 3, 1953 | 17 years, 140 days | Auditorium, Miami Beach, Florida, U.S. | |
| 41 | Win | 35–3–3 | Basil Marie | UD | 8 | Jan 26, 1953 | 17 years, 104 days | Coliseum Arena, New Orleans, Louisiana, U.S. | |
| 40 | Win | 34–3–3 | Jesse Underwood | UD | 10 | Dec 30, 1952 | 17 years, 77 days | Auditorium, Miami Beach, Florida, U.S. | |
| 39 | Win | 33–3–3 | Alfredo La Grutta | PTS | 8 | Dec 8, 1952 | 17 years, 55 days | Coliseum Arena, New Orleans, Louisiana, U.S. | |
| 38 | Win | 32–3–3 | Baby Vásquez | UD | 8 | Nov 24, 1952 | 17 years, 41 days | Coliseum Arena, New Orleans, Louisiana, U.S. | |
| 37 | Win | 31–3–3 | Alfredo La Grutta | UD | 8 | Nov 17, 1952 | 17 years, 34 days | Coliseum Arena, New Orleans, Louisiana, U.S. | |
| 36 | Win | 30–3–3 | Nelson Levering | KO | 1 (8) | Oct 14, 1952 | 17 years, 0 days | Coliseum Arena, New Orleans, Louisiana, U.S. | |
| 35 | Win | 29–3–3 | Larry Mujica | UD | 6 | Sep 8, 1952 | 16 years, 330 days | Coliseum Arena, New Orleans, Louisiana, U.S. | |
| 34 | Loss | 28–3–3 | Baby Vásquez | UD | 10 | Aug 26, 1952 | 16 years, 317 days | Auditorium, Miami Beach, Florida, U.S. | |
| 33 | Win | 28–2–3 | Johnny Craven | MD | 10 | Aug 12, 1952 | 16 years, 303 days | Auditorium, Miami Beach, Florida, U.S. | |
| 32 | Win | 27–2–3 | Larry Mujica | UD | 10 | Jul 29, 1952 | 16 years, 289 days | Auditorium, Miami Beach, Florida, U.S. | |
| 31 | Win | 26–2–3 | Diego Sosa | MD | 10 | Jul 15, 1952 | 16 years, 275 days | Auditorium, Miami Beach, Florida, U.S. | |
| 30 | Win | 25–2–3 | Sonny Luciano | PTS | 10 | Jul 1, 1952 | 16 years, 261 days | Auditorium, Miami Beach, Florida, U.S. | |
| 29 | Win | 24–2–3 | Juan Padilla | UD | 6 | Apr 21, 1952 | 16 years, 190 days | Coliseum Arena, New Orleans, Louisiana, U.S. | |
| 28 | Win | 23–2–3 | Kid Centella | MD | 6 | Mar 17, 1952 | 16 years, 155 days | Coliseum Arena, New Orleans, Louisiana, U.S. | |
| 27 | Win | 22–2–3 | Billy Neri | UD | 6 | Feb 4, 1952 | 16 years, 113 days | Coliseum Arena, New Orleans, Louisiana, U.S. | |
| 26 | Win | 21–2–3 | Johnny Capitano | UD | 6 | Jan 21, 1952 | 16 years, 99 days | Coliseum Arena, New Orleans, Louisiana, U.S. | |
| 25 | Win | 20–2–3 | Fred Monforte | UD | 8 | Nov 12, 1951 | 16 years, 29 days | Coliseum Arena, New Orleans, Louisiana, U.S. | |
| 24 | Win | 19–2–3 | Noel Humphreys | UD | 8 | Oct 22, 1951 | 16 years, 8 days | Coliseum Arena, New Orleans, Louisiana, U.S. | |
| 23 | Loss | 18–2–3 | Fred Monforte | SD | 8 | Sep 17, 1951 | 15 years, 338 days | Municipal Auditorium, New Orleans, Louisiana, U.S. | |
| 22 | Win | 18–1–3 | Noel Humphreys | UD | 8 | Sep 10, 1951 | 15 years, 331 days | Municipal Auditorium, New Orleans, Louisiana, U.S. | |
| 21 | Win | 17–1–3 | Pat Iacobucci | PTS | 8 | Aug 27, 1951 | 15 years, 317 days | Municipal Auditorium, New Orleans, Louisiana, U.S. | |
| 20 | Win | 16–1–3 | Alex Fimbres | PTS | 8 | Aug 13, 1951 | 15 years, 303 days | Municipal Auditorium, New Orleans, Louisiana, U.S. | |
| 19 | Win | 15–1–3 | George Easterling | TKO | 4 (6) | Jul 30, 1951 | 15 years, 289 days | Municipal Auditorium, New Orleans, Louisiana, U.S. | |
| 18 | Win | 14–1–3 | Bobby Brooks | UD | 6 | Jul 16, 1951 | 15 years, 275 days | Municipal Auditorium, New Orleans, Louisiana, U.S. | |
| 17 | Win | 13–1–3 | Herb Farris | KO | 3 (6) | Jun 25, 1951 | 15 years, 254 days | Coliseum Arena, New Orleans, Louisiana, U.S. | |
| 16 | Win | 12–1–3 | Tommy Baker | PTS | 6 | Jun 18, 1951 | 15 years, 247 days | Coliseum Arena, New Orleans, Louisiana, U.S. | |
| 15 | Win | 11–1–3 | Raul Reyna | KO | 2 (6) | Jun 4, 1951 | 15 years, 233 days | Coliseum Arena, New Orleans, Louisiana, U.S. | |
| 14 | Win | 10–1–3 | JW Henry | KO | 2 (6) | May 28, 1951 | 15 years, 226 days | Coliseum Arena, New Orleans, Louisiana, U.S. | |
| 13 | Win | 9–1–3 | Alex Vargas | SD | 8 | Apr 24, 1951 | 15 years, 192 days | Olympiad Arena, Houston, Texas, U.S. | |
| 12 | Draw | 8–1–3 | Johnny Capitano | PTS | 4 | Apr 2, 1951 | 15 years, 170 days | Coliseum Arena, New Orleans, Louisiana, U.S. | |
| 11 | Win | 8–1–2 | Johnny Longo | TKO | 2 (4) | Mar 14, 1951 | 15 years, 151 days | Coliseum Arena, New Orleans, Louisiana, U.S. | |
| 10 | Draw | 7–1–2 | Johnny Capitano | PTS | 4 | Feb 26, 1951 | 15 years, 135 days | Coliseum Arena, New Orleans, Louisiana, U.S. | |
| 9 | Win | 7–1–1 | Val Lambert | PTS | 4 | Nov 6, 1950 | 15 years, 23 days | Municipal Auditorium, New Orleans, Louisiana, U.S. | |
| 8 | Loss | 6–1–1 | Kid Centella | KO | 2 (6) | Oct 30, 1950 | 15 years, 16 days | Coliseum Arena, New Orleans, Louisiana, U.S. | |
| 7 | Win | 6–0–1 | Lawton DiSoso | UD | 8 | Oct 23, 1950 | 15 years, 9 days | Coliseum Arena, New Orleans, Louisiana, U.S. | |
| 6 | Win | 5–0–1 | Ruben Salazar | SD | 6 | Oct 11, 1950 | 14 years, 362 days | City Auditorium, Galveston, Texas, U.S. | |
| 5 | Win | 4–0–1 | Eddie Webb | UD | 6 | Oct 3, 1950 | 14 years, 354 days | Fort Homer Hesterly Armory, Tampa, Florida, U.S. | |
| 4 | Win | 3–0–1 | Ray Miranda | TKO | 4 (6) | Sep 14, 1950 | 14 years, 335 days | Fort Homer Hesterly Armory, Tampa, Florida, U.S. | |
| 3 | Win | 2–0–1 | Henry Luera | TKO | 4 (4) | Aug 28, 1950 | 14 years, 318 days | Municipal Auditorium, New Orleans, Louisiana, U.S. | |
| 2 | Win | 1–0–1 | Lawton DiSoso | PTS | 4 | Aug 16, 1950 | 14 years, 306 days | Coliseum Arena, New Orleans, Louisiana, U.S. | |
| 1 | Draw | 0–0–1 | Ray Smith | PTS | 4 | Aug 7, 1950 | 14 years, 297 days | Coliseum Arena, New Orleans, Louisiana, U.S. | |

== Titles in boxing ==
=== Major world titles ===
- WBA light middleweight champion (154 lbs)
- WBC light middleweight champion (154 lbs)

=== Regional/International titles ===
- Southern welterweight champion (147 lbs)

=== Undisputed titles ===
- Undisputed light middleweight champion

== See also ==
- List of world light-middleweight boxing champions

Achievements
| Preceded by Denny Moyer | WBA Junior middleweight champion April 29, 1963 – September 7, 1963 | Succeeded by Alessandro Mazzinghi |
| Preceded by Denny Moyer | WBC Junior middleweight champion April 29, 1963 – September 7, 1963 | Succeeded by Alessandro Mazzinghi |
| Preceded by Denny Moyer | Undisputed Junior middleweight champion April 29, 1963 – September 7, 1963 | Succeeded by Alessandro Mazzinghi |
