= Virgil Akins =

American boxer (1928-2011)

Personal information
- Nickname: Honeybear
- Born: March 10, 1928 St. Louis, Missouri, U.S.
- Died: January 22, 2011 (aged 82) St. Louis, Missouri, U.S.

Boxing career

Boxing record
- Total fights: 93
- Wins: 60
- Win by KO: 34
- Losses: 31
- Draws: 2

Virgil Akins (March 10, 1928 – January 22, 2011) was an American boxer who won the Undisputed Welterweight Championship of the World in 1958. Nicknamed ‘Honeybear’, Akins was the first World Champion boxer from St. Louis.

== Career ==
Akins was born and died in St. Louis, Missouri.

Akins was considered lanky, but proved nevertheless to be a powerful hitter with either hand. He began his career as a Lightweight in 1948, continuing to fight in that division for 6 years before finally growing into the Welterweight class. He was long considered to be an effective operator and boasted wins over future World Champions Joe Brown and Wallace ‘Bud’ Smith, as well as ending the incredible forty-seven fight winning streak of Ronnie Delaney, by way of knock-out in 1955.

Akins had powered his way up the rankings in both divisions and finally got his chance of a World title once Carmen Basilio relinquished the Welterweight Championship to concentrate on defending his new Middleweight crown. An elimination tournament including six of the World's top-rated Welterweights was swiftly established in an effort to find Basilio's successor. Akins emerged the victor and new World Champion on June 6, 1958, by pounding favourite Vince Martinez to a fourth round destruction. All told, Martinez went down nine times, having never seriously recovered from a shattering right delivered early in the First.

Akins's reign would not last long however. Six months later, he lost his title to Don Jordan by way of unanimous decision and in only his first defense. Akins disputed the result but fared no better in the return, held the following Spring. From that moment on, it was downhill all the way for the former champion, who would win just ten of his last twenty-three fights before hanging up his gloves in 1962.

Akins's contract was "owned" under the table by the notorious Frank "Blinky" Palermo, a member of the Philadelphia crime family. Palermo was imprisoned in 1961 for conspiracy and extortion for the covert ownership of prizefighters.

Akins died at the age of 82 on January 22, 2011.

== Professional boxing record ==
93 fights	60 wins	31 losses
By knockout	34	2
By decision	26	29
Draws	2	

No.	Result	Record	Opponent	Type	Round	Date	Location	Notes
93	Loss	60–31–2	Rip Randall	UD	10	Mar 20, 1962	Houston, Texas, U.S.	
92	Loss	60–30–2	Ralph Dupas	UD	10	Dec 27, 1961	Bayfront Park Auditorium, Miami, Florida, U.S.	
91	Win	60–29–2	Vince Bonomo	TKO	4 (10)	Dec 13, 1961	Auditorium, Miami Beach, Florida, U.S.	
90	Draw	59–29–2	Stefan Redl	TKO	10 (?)	Nov 17, 1961	Gladiators' Arena, Totowa, New Jersey, U.S.	
89	Win	59–29–1	Jose Antonio Burgos	TKO	10 (?)	Oct 16, 1961	Caracas, Venezuela	
88	Loss	58–29–1	Kenny Lane	UD	10	Sep 22, 1961	Navy-Marine Corps Mem. Stadium, Annapolis, Maryland, U.S.	
87	Loss	58–28–1	Henry White	MD	10	Sep 5, 1961	Vogue Arena, Chicago, Illinois, U.S.	
86	Win	58–27–1	Cecil Shorts	TKO	8 (10)	Jul 10, 1961	Vogue Arena, Chicago, Illinois, U.S.	
85	Win	57–27–1	Billy Collins	UD	10	May 15, 1961	Marigold Gardens, Chicago, Illinois, U.S.	
84	Win	56–27–1	Gerald Gray	MD	10	Mar 4, 1961	Sabina Park, Kingston, Jamaica	
83	Win	55–27–1	TJ Jones	TKO	9 (10)	Jan 16, 1961	Marigold Gardens, Chicago, Illinois, U.S.	
82	Loss	54–27–1	Candy McFarland	SD	10	Dec 6, 1960	Convention Hall, Philadelphia, Pennsylvania	
81	Win	54–26–1	Carl Hubbard	KO	5 (10)	Nov 21, 1960	Marigold Gardens, Chicago, Illinois, U.S.	
80	Loss	53–26–1	Luis Manuel Rodriguez	UD	10	Jul 6, 1960	Freedom Hall, Louisville, Kentucky, U.S.	
79	Win	53–25–1	Charley Scott	UD	10	May 20, 1960	Chase Hotel, Saint Louis, Missouri, U.S.	
78	Win	52–25–1	Fernando Barreto	PTS	10	Apr 1, 1960	Ginásio Estadual do Ibirapuera, Sao Paulo, Sao Paulo, Brazil	
77	Loss	51–25–1	Wally Swift	PTS	10	Mar 8, 1960	Empire Pool, Wembley, London, England, U.K.	
76	Loss	51–24–1	Don Fullmer	UD	10	Jan 28, 1960	Kiel Auditorium, Saint Louis, Missouri, U.S.	
75	Loss	51–23–1	Denny Moyer	SD	10	Dec 10, 1959	Auditorium, Portland, Oregon, U.S.	
74	Loss	51–22–1	Kenny Lane	MD	10	Oct 28, 1959	Capitol Arena, Washington, D.C., U.S.	
73	Win	51–21–1	Stan Harrington	MD	10	Aug 14, 1959	Civic Auditorium, Honolulu, Hawaii, U.S.	
72	Loss	50–21–1	Luis Manuel Rodriguez	UD	10	Jun 17, 1959	Exhibition Hall, Miami Beach, Florida, U.S.	
71	Loss	50–20–1	Don Jordan	UD	15	Apr 24, 1959	Kiel Auditorium, Saint Louis, Missouri, U.S.	For NYSAC, NBA, and The Ring welterweight titles
70	Loss	50–19–1	Don Jordan	UD	15	Dec 5, 1958	Olympic Auditorium, Los Angeles, California, U.S.	Lost NYSAC, NBA, and The Ring welterweight titles
69	Loss	50–18–1	Del Flanagan	UD	10	Sep 18, 1958	Auditorium, Saint Paul, Minnesota, U.S.	
68	Win	50–17–1	Charley Tombstone Smith	TKO	10 (10)	Aug 20, 1958	Chicago Stadium, Chicago, Illinois, U.S.	
67	Win	49–17–1	Vince Martinez	TKO	4 (15)	Jun 6, 1958	Arena, Saint Louis, Missouri, U.S.	Won vacant NYSAC, NBA and The Ring welterweight titles
66	Win	48–17–1	Issac Logart	TKO	6 (12)	Mar 21, 1958	Madison Square Garden, Manhattan, New York City, New York, U.S.	
65	Win	47–17–1	Tony DeMarco	TKO	12 (15)	Jan 21, 1958	Boston Garden, Boston, Massachusetts, U.S.	Retained Massachusetts world welterweight title
64	Win	46–17–1	Tony DeMarco	KO	14 (15)	Oct 29, 1957	Boston Garden, Boston, Massachusetts, U.S.	Won vacant Massachusetts world welterweight title
63	Loss	45–17–1	Gil Turner	PTS	10	Sep 18, 1957	Convention Hall, Atlantic City, New Jersey, U.S.	
62	Win	45–16–1	Garnet Hart	TKO	8 (10)	Aug 9, 1957	Public Hall, Cleveland, Ohio, U.S.	
61	Loss	44–16–1	Franz Szuzina	UD	10	Jul 8, 1957	Kiel Auditorium, Saint Louis, Missouri, U.S.	
60	Win	44–15–1	Walter Byars	UD	10	Jun 12, 1957	Arena, Norfolk, Virginia, U.S.	
59	Win	43–15–1	Jimmy Beecham	TKO	3 (10)	May 24, 1957	Capitol Arena, Washington, D.C., U.S.	
58	Win	42–15–1	Franz Szuzina	UD	10	Mar 4, 1957	Kiel Auditorium, Saint Louis, Missouri, U.S.	
57	Win	41–15–1	Al Andrews	TKO	6 (10)	Jan 31, 1957	Kiel Auditorium, Saint Louis, Missouri, U.S.	
56	Win	40–15–1	Sammy Walker	UD	10	Jan 8, 1957	Memorial Auditorium, Buffalo, New York, U.S.	
55	Win	39–15–1	Pat Lowry	KO	2 (10)	Oct 22, 1956	Biscayne Arena, Miami, Florida, U.S.	
54	Loss	38–15–1	Charlie Sawyer	UD	10	Sep 15, 1956	Legion Stadium, Hollywood, California, U.S.	
53	Win	38–14–1	Don Jose	TKO	4 (10)	Jun 21, 1956	Kallio's Arena, Monroe, Louisiana, U.S.	
52	Win	37–14–1	Hector Constance	UD	10	Mar 21, 1956	Arena, Saint Louis, Missouri, U.S.	
51	Win	36–14–1	Andy Watkins	TKO	2 (10)	Mar 8, 1956	Alnad Temple, East Saint Louis, Missouri, U.S.	
50	Win	35–14–1	Mel Barker	TKO	8 (10)	Jan 26, 1956	Alnad Temple, East Saint Louis, Missouri, U.S.	
49	Win	34–14–1	Clarence Cook	KO	4 (10)	Jan 19, 1956	Sportatorium, Sportatorium, Dallas, Texas, U.S.	
48	Win	33–14–1	Rudolph Bent	TKO	5 (10)	Jan 3, 1956	Valley Arena, Holyoke, Massachusetts, U.S.	
47	Loss	32–14–1	Issac Logart	UD	10	Dec 2, 1955	Madison Square Garden, Manhattan, New York City, New York, U.S.	
46	Win	32–13–1	Harold Jones	UD	10	Sep 13, 1955	Victory Field, Indianapolis, Indiana, U.S.	
45	Win	31–13–1	Issac Logart	SD	10	Aug 8, 1955	St. Nicholas Arena, Manhattan, New York City, New York, U.S.	
44	Win	30–13–1	Bill Sudduth	TKO	8 (10)	Jun 21, 1955	Marigold Gardens, Chicago, Illinois, U.S.	
43	Win	29–13–1	Joe Miceli	TKO	1 (10)	May 23, 1955	St. Nicholas Arena, Manhattan, New York City, New York, U.S.	
42	Win	28–13–1	Ronnie Delaney	KO	8 (10)	May 2, 1955	St. Nicholas Arena, Manhattan, New York City, New York, U.S.	
41	Draw	27–13–1	Johnny Brown	PTS	8	Apr 8, 1955	Arena, Saint Louis, Missouri, U.S.	
40	Win	27–13	Tommy Maddox	TKO	4 (10)	Mar 15, 1955	Marigold Gardens, Chicago, Illinois, U.S.	
39	Win	26–13	Johnny Brown	TKO	10 (10)	Mar 2, 1955	Miami Stadium, Miami, Florida, U.S.	
38	Win	25–13	Henry Hank	UD	8	Oct 26, 1954	Motor City Arena, Detroit, Michigan, U.S.	
37	Loss	24–13	Andrew Brown	SD	10	Oct 16, 1954	Coliseum Arena, New Orleans, Louisiana, U.S.	
36	Win	24–12	Joey Greenwood	TKO	8 (10)	Jun 2, 1954	Arena, Saint Louis, Missouri, U.S.	
35	Loss	23–12	Philip Kim	TKO	10 (10)	Aug 29, 1953	Rainbo Arena, Chicago, Illinois, U.S.	
34	Loss	23–11	Johnny Gonsalves	MD	10	Apr 4, 1953	Rainbo Arena, Chicago, Illinois, U.S.	
33	Loss	23–10	Joe Miceli	UD	10	Sep 30, 1952	Arena, Milwaukee, Wisconsin, U.S.	
32	Loss	23–9	Johnny Saxton	UD	10	Jul 30, 1952	Chicago Stadium, Chicago, Illinois, U.S.	
31	Win	23–8	Jay Watkins	TKO	2 (10)	May 8, 1952	Chicago Stadium, Chicago, Illinois, U.S.	
30	Win	22–8	Henry Davis	TKO	9 (10)	Feb 29, 1952	Legion Stadium, Hollywood, California, U.S.	
29	Win	21–8	Joe Gilmer	TKO	9 (10)	Feb 19, 1952	Olympic Auditorium, Los Angeles, California, U.S.	
28	Win	20–8	Baby LeRoy	TKO	4 (10)	Feb 8, 1952	Legion Stadium, Hollywood, California, U.S.	
27	Loss	19–8	Luther Rawlings	PTS	8	Dec 24, 1951	Madison Square Garden, Manhattan, New York City, New York, U.S.	
26	Win	19–7	Joe Brown	UD	10	Dec 6, 1951	Kiel Auditorium, Saint Louis, Missouri, U.S.	
25	Win	18–7	Luther Rawlings	SD	10	Oct 17, 1951	Arena, Saint Louis, Missouri, U.S.	
24	Win	17–7	Freddie Dawson	SD	10	Sep 26, 1951	Arena, Saint Louis, Missouri, U.S.	
23	Loss	16–7	Joe Brown	PTS	10	Jul 6, 1951	Coliseum Arena, New Orleans, Louisiana, U.S.	
22	Win	16–6	Tommy Campbell	PTS	10	Jun 8, 1951	Coliseum Arena, New Orleans, Louisiana, U.S.	
21	Loss	15–6	Joe Brown	PTS	10	May 25, 1951	Coliseum Arena, New Orleans, Louisiana, U.S.	
20	Win	15–5	Wallace Bud Smith	PTS	10	Apr 17, 1951	Kiel Auditorium, Saint Louis, Missouri, U.S.	
19	Win	14–5	Wallace Bud Smith	PTS	10	Apr 4, 1951	Madison Square Garden, Manhattan, New York City, New York, U.S.	
18	Win	13–5	Gene Parker	TKO	6 (6)	Mar 9, 1951	Madison Square Garden, Manhattan, New York City, New York, U.S.	
17	Loss	12–5	Gene Parker	UD	6	Jan 18, 1951	Auditorium, Minneapolis, Minnesota, U.S.	
16	Win	12–4	Joe Sgro	UD	10	Dec 6, 1950	Arena, Saint Louis, Missouri, U.S.	
15	Win	11–4	Rudy Zadell	TKO	3 (8)	Nov 1, 1950	Arena, Saint Louis, Missouri, U.S.	
14	Win	10–4	Nelson Levering	KO	2 (8)	Oct 24, 1950	Kiel Auditorium, Saint Louis, Missouri, U.S.	
13	Win	9–4	Art Edmundson	PTS	8	Oct 5, 1950	Arena, Saint Louis, Missouri, U.S.	
12	Loss	8–4	Joe Fisher	PTS	8	Jul 15, 1950	Denver, Colorado, U.S.	
11	Loss	8–3	Nelson Levering	PTS	6	Jul 6, 1950	Warren Bowl, Cheyenne, Wyoming, U.S.	
10	Loss	8–2	Arthur Persley	PTS	6	Sep 29, 1949	Sunnyside Garden, Sunnyside, Queens, New York City, New York, U.S.	
9	Win	8–1	Clem Custer	PTS	8	Mar 30, 1949	Kiel Auditorium, Saint Louis, Missouri, U.S.	
8	Win	7–1	Willie Cheatum	PTS	8	Mar 8, 1949	Kiel Auditorium, Saint Louis, Missouri, U.S.	
7	Win	6–1	Russ Moore	KO	2 (6)	Feb 15, 1949	Forum, Wichita, Kansas, U.S.	
6	Win	5–1	Joe Henderson	KO	3 (6)	Jan 17, 1949	Kiel Auditorium, Saint Louis, Missouri, U.S.	
5	Win	4–1	Danny Robinson	PTS	6	Nov 23, 1948	Kiel Auditorium, Saint Louis, Missouri, U.S.	
4	Win	3–1	Ollie Cobbins	PTS	6	Jul 12, 1948	Kiel Auditorium, Saint Louis, Missouri, U.S.	
3	Win	2–1	Charlie Baxter	PTS	6	Apr 21, 1948	Kiel Auditorium, Saint Louis, Missouri, U.S.	
2	Loss	1–1	Charlie Baxter	TKO	3 (6)	Apr 5, 1948	Kiel Auditorium, Saint Louis, Missouri, U.S.	
1	Win	1–0	Albert Adams	PTS	6	Mar 10, 1948	Kiel Auditorium, Saint Louis, Missouri, U.S.	

== Titles in boxing ==
=== Major world titles ===
- NYSAC welterweight champion (147 lbs)
- NBA (WBA) welterweight champion (147 lbs)

=== The Ring magazine titles ===
- The Ring welterweight champion (147 lbs)

=== Regional/International titles ===
- Massachusetts welterweight champion (147 lbs)

=== Undisputed titles ===
- Undisputed welterweight champion

== Honors ==
- Named The Ring magazine Progress of the Year fighter for 1958.
- Elected to the Gateway Classic Walk of Fame

== See also ==
- List of welterweight boxing champions

Sporting positions
World boxing titles
Vacant Title last held by Carmen Basilio	NYSAC welterweight champion June 6, 1958 – December 5, 1958	Succeeded by Don Jordan
Vacant Title last held by Carmen Basilio	NBA welterweight champion June 6, 1958 – December 5, 1958	Succeeded by Don Jordan
Vacant Title last held by Carmen Basilio	The Ring welterweight champion June 6, 1958 – December 5, 1958	Succeeded by Don Jordan
Vacant Title last held by Carmen Basilio	Undisputed welterweight champion June 6, 1958 – December 5, 1958	Succeeded by Don Jordan
