= List of English sportsmen and sportswomen =

Listed below are English sportsmen and sportswomen of note and some notable individuals born in England.

== A ==
- Barney Aaron (Young) (1800–1850), lightweight boxer, Hall of Fame
- Harold Abrahams (1899–1978), athlete, Olympic champion (100-metre sprint) and silver (4x100-metre relay), one of the two subjects of the 1981 historical sports drama film Chariots of Fire
- Sidney Abrahams (1885–1957), Olympic long jumper
- Chris Adams (1955–2001), professional wrestler and judoka
- Neil Adams (born 1958), judoka and two-time silver medalist in judo (1980 and 1984); younger brother of Chris Adams
- Nicola Adams (born 1982), two-time Olympic gold medallist and former world champion boxer
- Tony Adams (born 1966), footballer
- Trent Alexander-Arnold (born 1998), footballer
- Edward Allen, footballer
- Dele Alli (born 1996), footballer
- Malcolm Allison (1927–2010), football manager
- Simon Andrews (1984–2014), Isle of Man TT rider
- Jo Ankier (born 1982), Britain, record holder (1,500-metre and 3,000-metre steeplechase)
- Willie Applegarth (1890–1958), track and field athlete
- James Arnott, footballer
- Dina Asher-Smith (born 1995), fastest British woman; world champion (200-metre Doha 2019)
- Graham Atkinson (1943–2017), footballer

== B ==
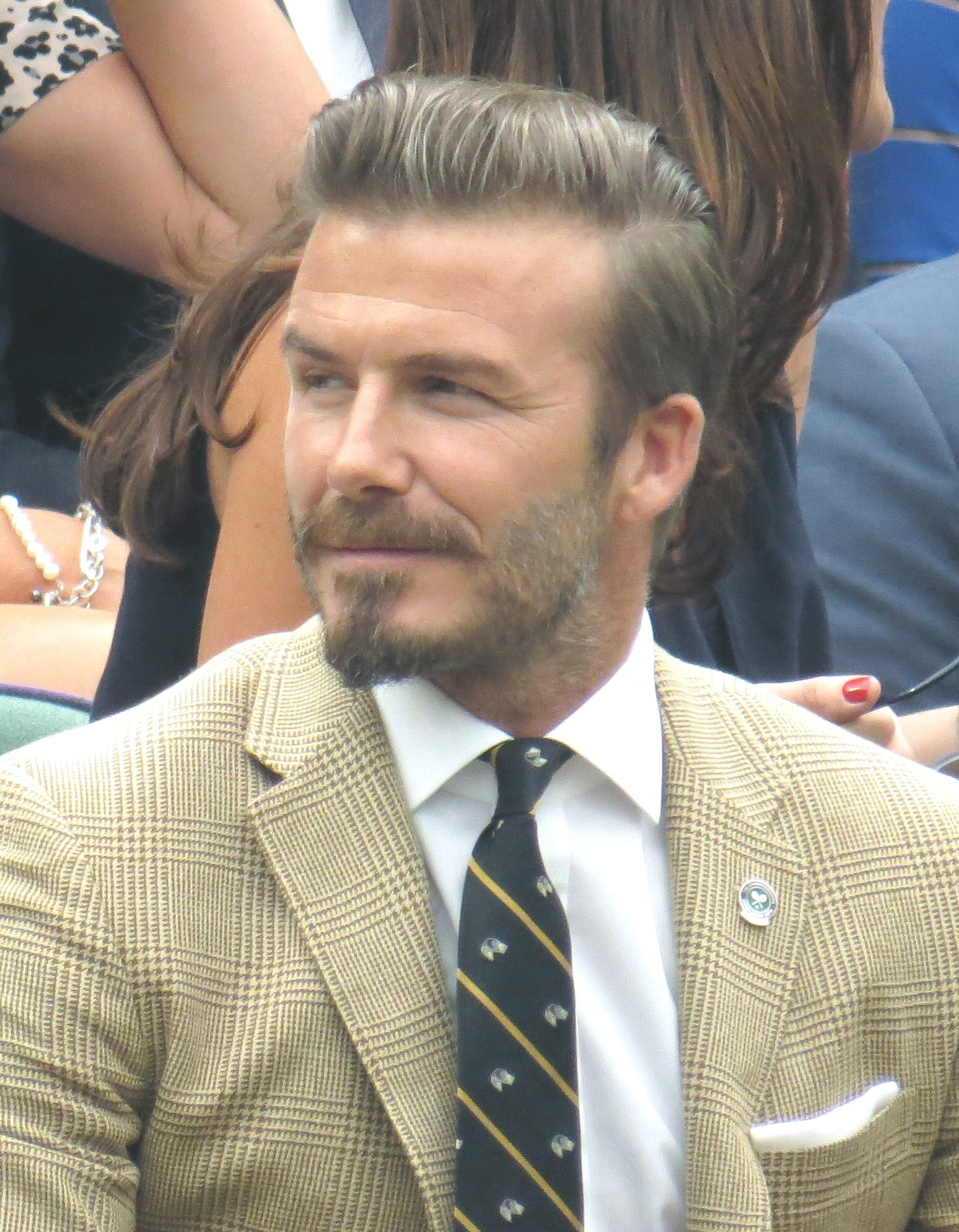
David Beckham

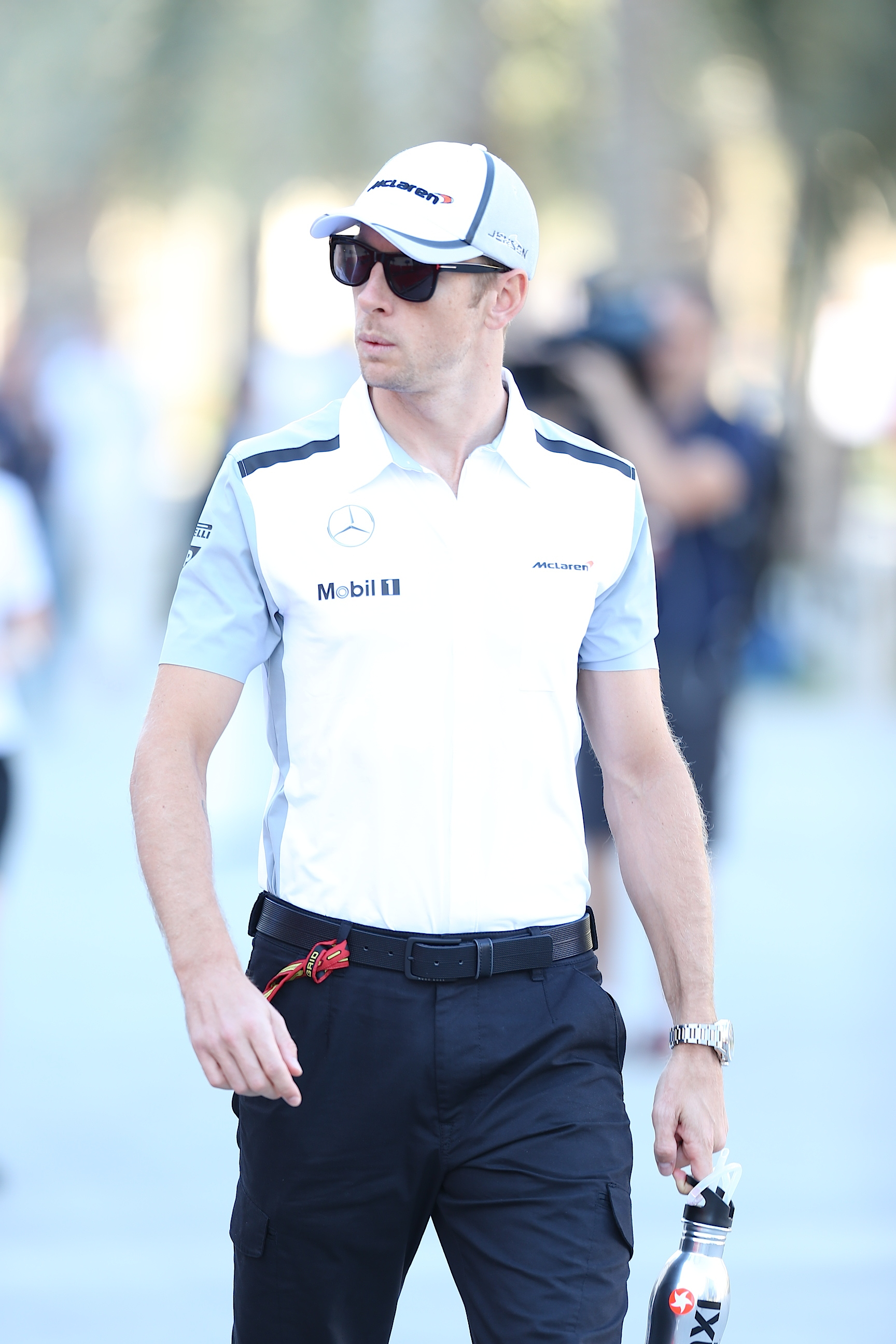
Jenson Button

- Joe Baker (1940–2003), footballer and manager
- George Baldry (1911–1987), footballer
- Alan Ball (1945–2007), member of the 1966 World Cup winning team
- Billy Balmer (1875–1961), footballer
- Gordon Banks (1937–2019), goalkeeper of 1966 World Cup winning team
- Roger Bannister (1929–2018), first sub-four-minute miler
- Robert Barker (1847–1915), footballer
- Donny Barnard (born 1984), footballer
- Wade Barrett (born 1980), WWE wrestler
- Cliff Bastin (1912–1991), footballer
- Arthur Bate (1908–1993), footballer
- Lord Frederick Beauclerk (1773–1850), cricket player and administrator
- David Beckham (born 1975), footballer
- Jude Bellingham (born 2003), footballer
- Charles Bennett (1870–1948) track and field athlete
- Lawson Bennett (1938–2011), footballer
- Jack Kid Berg (Judah Bergman) (1909–1991), world champion junior welterweight boxer, Hall of Fame
- Richard Bergmann (1919–1970), 7-time table tennis world champion, ITTFHoF
- Billy Betts (1864–1941), footballer
- Ted Birnie (1878–1935), footballer and manager
- Sid Bishop (1900–1949), footballer
- Nick Blackman (born 1989), English-Israeli footballer
- Andrulla Blanchette (born 1966), IFBB professional bodybuilder
- Steve Bloomer (1874–1938), footballer and manager
- Chris Bonington (born 1934), mountaineer
- Bernard Bosanquet (1877–1936), cricketer
- Ian Botham (born 1955), cricketer
- Mark Bott, cricketer
- Teddy Bourne (born 1948), Olympic épée fencer
- Geoffrey Boycott (born 1940), cricketer
- James Brae, footballer
- Eric Bristow (1957–2018), world champion darts player
- Peter Broadbent (1933–2013), footballer
- Johnny Brooks (1931–2016), footballer and manager
- Tony Brooks (1932–2022), F1 driver
- Steve Bruce (born 1960), footballer & manager
- Bobby Buckle (1869–1959), footballer
- Chris Buckley (1886–1973), footballer
- Frank Buckley (1882–1964), footballer and manager
- Paul Burchill (born 1979), professional wrestler
- Cam Burgess (1919–1978), footballer
- Joe Butler (1879–1941), football player
- Jenson Button (born 1980), 2009 Formula One World Champion
- Angela Buxton (1934–2020), won 1956 French Women's Doubles (with Althea Gibson) and 1956 Wimbledon Women's Doubles (with Gibson), highest world ranking #9

== C ==
- Michael Carrick (1981), footballer
- Herbert Chapman (1878–1934), football player and manager
- Bobby Charlton (born 1937), member of the 1966 World Cup winning team
- Jack Charlton (1935–2020), member of the 1966 World Cup winning team
- Dave Charnley (1935–2012), lightweight boxer
- Charles Chenery (1850–1928), footballer and cricketer
- Francis Chichester (1901–1972), yachtsman
- Ian Clough (1937–1970), mountaineer
- Don Cockell (1928–1983), heavyweight boxer
- Samuel Coe (1873–1955), first-class cricketer
- Chris Cohen (born 1987), footballer
- George Cohen (1939–2022), association football right back, World Cup champion
- Andy Cole (born 1971), footballer
- Paul Collingwood (born 1976), cricketer
- Peter Collins (1931–1958), F1 driver
- Henry Cooper (1934–2011), heavyweight boxer
- Ralph Cooperman (1927–2009), Olympic foil and sabre fencer
- Steve Coppell (born 1955), footballer & manager
- Lisa Cross (born 1978), IFBB professional bodybuilder
- Sid Crowl (1888–1971), footballer
- Russell Cuddihey (born 1939), footballer
- Stan Cullis (1916–2001), footballer and manager
- Laurie Cunningham (1956–1989), footballer

== D ==
- Tom Daley (born 1994), youngest diver ever to compete in Olympics (participated in Beijing 2008)
- Lawrence Dallaglio (born 1972), World Cup winning rugby footballer
- Alan Davies (1933–2009), World Cup winning rugby footballer
- Laura Davies (born 1963), golfer
- Steve Davis (born 1957), six-time World Snooker Champion
- Matt Dawson (born 1972), World Cup winning rugby footballer
- John Deacon (1962–2001), motorcycle endurance racer
- Christopher Dean (born 1958), figure skater
- John Derbyshire (1878–1938), swimmer
- Graham Dilley (1959–2011), cricketer
- Percy Down (1883–1954), rugby union player, represented England and Great Britain
- Ted Drake (1912–1995), footballer and manager, cricketer for Hampshire County Cricket Club
- Fred Driver, footballer
- Harry Duckworth, footballer
- Jimmy Dugdale (1932–2008), footballer

== E ==
- Duncan Edwards (1936–1958), footballer
- Jonathan Edwards (born 1966), triple jump
- Joe Egan (1919–2012), rugby footballer
- Godfrey Evans (1920–1999), cricketer (wicket-keeper)
- Ray Evans (1933–2009), footballer
- Fred Ewer (1898–1971), footballer

== F ==
- James Fairburn, footballer
- Percy Fender, cricketer
- James Figg (before 1700 – 1734), prizefighter
- Tom Finney (1922–2014) footballer
- Albert Firth (1937–2015), rugby footballer
- William Fiske (1885–1918), footballer
- Bob Fitzsimmons (1863–1917), boxing's first world champion in three divisions
- Andrew Flintoff (born 1977), cricketer
- Phil Foden (born 2000), footballer
- Septimus Francom (1882–1965), long-distance runner
- C. B. Fry (1872–1956), cricketer and all-round athlete
- Tyson Fury (born 1988), professional boxer

== G ==
- Ron Garland (1931–1989), footballer
- Paul Gascoigne (born 1967), football player
- Les Gaunt (1918–1985), footballer
- Dwight Gayle (born 1989), football player
- Steven Gerrard (born 1980), football player
- Graham Gooch (born 1953), cricketer
- Pete Goss (born 1961), around-the-world yachtsman
- Grantley Goulding (1874–1947), athlete
- W. G. Grace (1848–1915), cricketer
- Cyril Grant (1920–2002), footballer
- Jimmy Greaves (1940–2021), footballer
- Jack Greenwell (1884–1942), footballer and manager
- Mason Greenwood (born 2001), footballer
- Ron Greenwood (1921–2006), footballer and manager
- Will Greenwood (born 1972), rugby footballer

== H ==
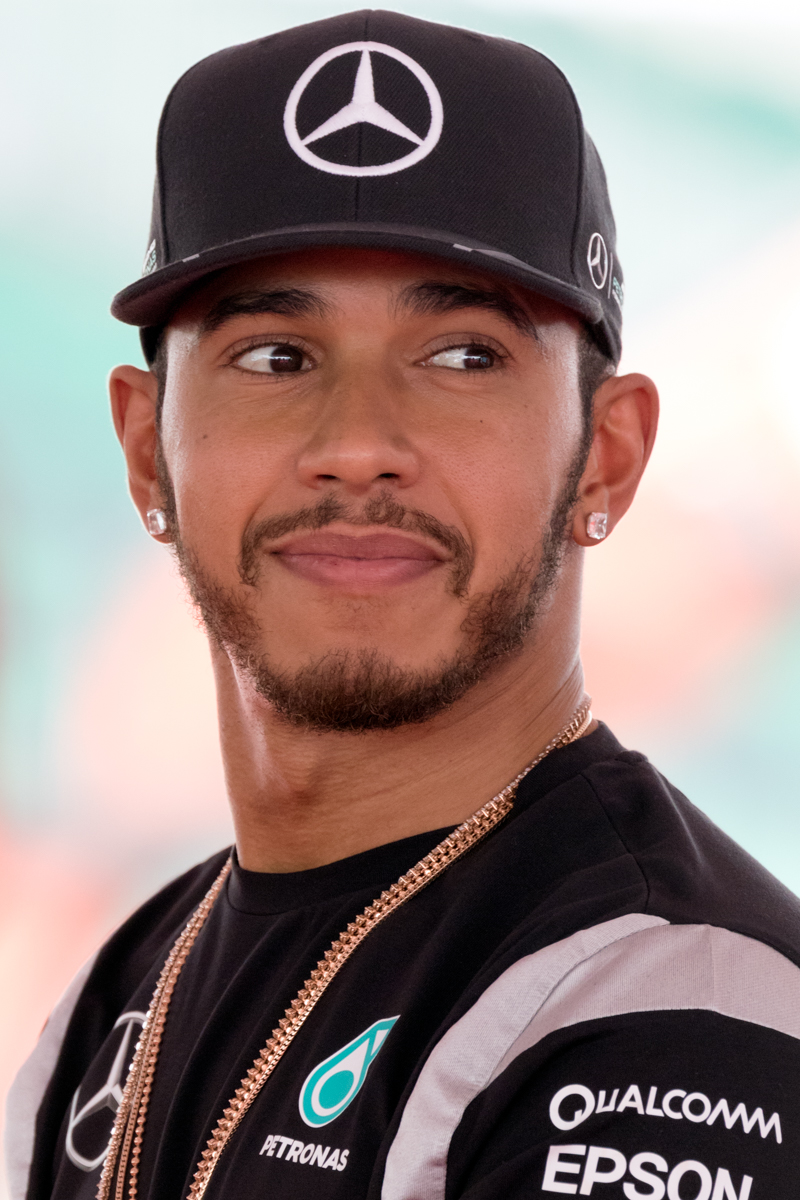
Lewis Hamilton

- Ernest Hackett (1908–?), footballer
- Sam Haden (1902–1974), footballer and manager
- Naseem Hamed (born 1974), featherweight boxer
- Lewis Hamilton (born 1985), seven-time Formula One World Champion
- Harry Hampton (1885–1963), football player
- Ellis Hargreaves, footballer
- Ricky Hatton (born 1978), world champion boxer
- Mike Hawthorn (1929–1959), F1 World Champion
- David Haye (born 1980), world champion boxer
- Johnny Haynes (1934–2005), footballer
- Arthur Henfrey (1867–1929), footballer
- Emile Heskey (born 1978), footballer
- Charlie Hewitt (1884–1966), footballer and manager
- Damon Hill (born 1960), F1 World Champion
- Graham Hill (1929–1975), two times F1 World Champion
- Jimmy Hill (1928–2015), footballer
- Syd Hoar (1895–1967), footballer
- David Hobbs (born 1939), Former Formula One driver
- Jack Hobbs (1882–1963), cricketer
- Glenn Hoddle (born 1957), footballer
- Martin Hodgson (1909–1991), rugby footballer
- Teddy Hodgson (1885–1919), footballer
- Ken Holliday (1925–1999), footballer
- Duncan Horton (born 1967), footballer
- Leslie Housden (1894–1963), Olympic marathon runner
- William Howarth (1875–?), footballer
- John Howell (born 1936), Olympic long jumper
- Alexander Hughes (1907–1977), footballer
- Kenneth Hunt (1884–1949), footballer
- James Hunt (1947–1993), F1 World Champion
- Norman Hunter (1943–2020), footballer and manager
- Geoff Hurst (born 1941), member of the 1966 World Cup winning team
- Nasser Hussain (born 1968), cricketer
- Len Hutton (1916–1990), cricketer
- Gus Huxford (1889–1961), footballer

== I–J ==
- David Jack (1898–1958), footballer and manager
- John Jackett (1878–1935), rugby union player; represented England and Great Britain
- Peter Jacobs (born 1938), Olympic fencer
- Peter Jaffe, Olympic silver (yachting; star-class)
- Allan Jay (1931–2023), épée and foil fencer, Olympic two-time silver, world champion
- Richard Jerome (born 1968), cricketer
- Martin Johnson (born 1970), World Cup–winning rugby union footballer
- Trish Johnson (born 1966), golfer
- Anthony Joshua (born 1989), professional boxer

== K ==
- Harry Kane (born 1993), footballer
- Brian Keeble (1938–2015), footballer
- Mike Keen (1940–2009), footballer
- Howard Kendall (1946–2015), footballer and manager of Everton F.C.
- Joe Kennedy (1925–1986), footballer
- Josh Kennet (born 1987), English-Israeli footballer
- Joseph Kenyon, footballer
- Amir Khan (born 1986), lightweight boxer
- Herbert Kingaby (1880–1934), footballer
- Joseph Kitchen (1890–1974), footballer
- Paul Klenerman (born 1963), Olympic sabre fencer

== L ==
- Frank Lampard (born 1978), footballer
- Dougie Lampkin (born 1976), Motorcycle Trials World Champion
- Mark Lazarus (born 1938), footballer, right winger
- Jason Leonard (born 1968), World Cup winning rugby union footballer
- Edward Lawrence Levy (1851–1932), English world champion weightlifter
- Lennox Lewis (born 1965), world champion heavyweight boxer
- Ted "Kid" Lewis (Gershon Mendeloff) (1893–1970), world champion welterweight boxer, Hall of Fame
- Josh Lewsey (born 1976), rugby footballer
- Jim Leytham (1879–1916), rugby footballer
- Billy Lindsay (1872–1933), footballer
- Jimmy Lindsay (1880–1925), footballer
- Gary Lineker (born 1960), footballer
- Sam Little (born 1975), professional golfer
- Nat Lofthouse (1925–2011), footballer
- James Lomas (1879–1960), rugby footballer
- Robert Lowe, footballer
- Hyman Lurie (1918–1982), table tennis player
- Dar Lyon, cricketer

== M ==
- Dame Ellen MacArthur (born 1976), sailor; holds world record for the fastest solo circumnavigation of the globe
- Ernie Machin (1944–2012), footballer
- George Mallory (1886–1924), mountaineer
- Andy Mangan (born 1986), footballer
- Nigel Mansell (born 1953), racing driver, F1 and CART champion
- Terry Marsh (born 1958), world-champion boxer
- Darren Matthews (born 1968), professional wrestler
- Stanley Matthews (1915–2000), footballer
- Thomas Matthews (1884–1969), cyclist
- Jock McAvoy (1908–1971), boxer
- Bill McGarry (1927–2005), footballer and manager
- Bertie Mee (1918–2001), footballer and manager
- Daniel Mendoza (1764–1836), world-heavyweight-champion boxer, Hall of Fame
- Sidney Merlin (1856–1952), sports shooter
- John Middleton (1910–1971), footballer
- Colin Milburn (1941–1990), cricketer
- Gordon Miller (born 1939), Olympic high jumper
- Alan Minter (1951–2020), world champion boxer
- Ivor Montagu (1904–1984), British national team; founder, International Table Tennis Federation
- Stan Mortensen (1921–1991), footballer and manager
- Bobby Moore (1941–1993), captain of the 1966 World Cup–winning team
- Stirling Moss (1929–2020), F1 driver
- Mason Mount (born 1999), footballer
- Andy Murray (born 1987), tennis player; current number-two seed
- Alfred Mynn (1807–1861), cricketer

== N ==
- Gary Neville (born 1975), footballer
- Phil Neville (born 1977), footballer
- Alison Nicholas (born 1962), golfer
- Lando Norris (born 1999), racing driver; 2025 Formula One world champion
- Harry Nuttall (1897–1969), footballer

== O ==
- William Oakley (1873–1934), footballer
- Ronnie O'Sullivan (born 1975), three time World Snooker Champion
- Michael Owen (born 1979), football player
- James Oyebola (1961–2007), heavyweight boxer

== P ==
- Bob Paisley (1919–1996), 3-time European Cup winning manager with Liverpool F.C.
- Cole Palmer (born 2002), footballer
- Rachel Parish (born 1981), markswoman and fencer
- Michael Park (1966–2005), WRC co-driver
- John Parrott (born 1964), world snooker champion
- George Payne (1921–1987), footballer
- Cyril Peacock (1929–1992), racing cyclist
- Fred Perry (1909–1995), Wimbledon champion tennis player
- Martin Peters (1943–2019), member of the 1966 World Cup winning team
- Eddie Phillips (1911–1995), boxer
- Kevin Pietersen (born 1980), cricketer
- Jack Plant (1871–1950), footballer
- David Pleat (born 1945), footballer, manager, and sports commentator
- David Pratt (1896–1967), footballer and manager
- Daniel Prenn (1904–1991), tennis player, highest world ranking #6
- Stephanie Proud (born 1988), backstroke swimmer

== Q ==
- Darren Quinton (born 1986), footballer

== R ==
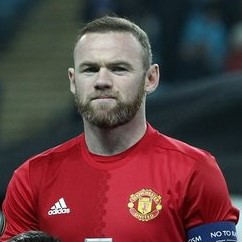
Wayne Rooney

- Samuel Rabin (1903–1991), Olympic bronze wrestler (freestyle middleweight)
- Paula Radcliffe (born 1973), distance runner
- Alf Ramsay (1920–1999), football player and manager
- John Raphael (1882–1917), cricket and rugby union
- Marcus Rashford (born 1997), footballer
- Steve Redgrave (born 1962), rower; winner of gold medal in five consecutive Olympics
- William Regal (born 1968), WWE wrestler and commentator
- Cyrille Regis (1958–2018), footballer
- Gordon Richards (1904–1988), jockey; holder of several records
- Richard Riley, footballer
- Jack Robinson (1870–1931), footballer
- Bobby Robson (1933–2009), football manager
- Wayne Rooney (born 1985), footballer; all-time leading goal scorer for the England national football team (The Three Lions) and Manchester United F.C.
- George Russell (born 1998), racing driver

== S ==
- Bukayo Saka (born 2001), footballer
- David Seaman (born 1963), footballer
- Archie Sexton (1908–1957), boxer
- Dave Sexton (1930–2012), footballer and manager
- Paul Scholes (born 1974), footballer
- Alan Shearer (born 1970), footballer, all-time leading goal scorer in the premiership
- Teddy Sheringham (born 1966), football player
- Ruth Shevelen (born 1992), trampoline gymnast
- Georgia Shiels (born 1996), rally driver
- Kelly Simm (born 1995), artistic gymnast
- Davey Boy Smith (1962–2002), professional wrestler
- Joe Smith (1889–1971), footballer and manager
- Tom Smith (1876–1937), footballer
- Cyril Spiers (1902–1967), footballer and manager
- Dennis Stevens (1933–2012), footballer
- Nobby Stiles (1942–2020), football World Cup winner
- Andrew Stoddart (1863–1915), rugby and cricket player
- Frederick Stokes (1850–1929), rugby footballer
- Dr. Lennard Stokes (1856–1933), rugby footballer
- Karen Stupples (born 1973), golfer
- Frank Swift (1913–1958), footballer
- Andrew Sznajder (born 1967), English-born Canadian tennis player

== T ==
- Laurie Taitt (1934–2006), Olympic sprint hurdler
- Graham Taylor (1944–2017), footballer and manager
- Peta Taylor (1912–1989), cricketer
- Phil Taylor (born 1960), multiple world-champion darts player
- John Terry (born 1980), footballer
- Albert Thompson (1885–1956), footballer
- Jayne Torvill (born 1957), figure skater
- William Townley (1866–1950), footballer and manager
- Frank Townsend (1925–1946), rugby footballer
- Jack Tresadern (1890–1959), footballer and manager
- Marcus Trescothick (born 1975), cricketer
- Fred Trueman (1931–2006), fast bowler
- Phil Tufnell (born 1966), cricketer
- Derek Turner (1932–2015), World Cup–winning rugby footballer
- Randolph Turpin (1928–1966), middleweight boxer
- George Tweedy (1913–1987), footballer
- Geoff Twentyman (1930–2004), footballer and manager

== U–V ==
- Michael Vaughan (born 1974), cricketer
- Stan Vickers (1932–2013), athlete

== W–Z ==
- Virginia Wade (born 1945), tennis player
- Sir Wavell Wakefield (1898–1983), rugby footballer and politician
- George Waller (1864–1937), footballer
- Wallis Walters (1878–1952), hurdler
- Frank Warren (born 1952), boxing promoter
- Matt Wells (1886–1953), lightweight champion of Great Britain and world champion welterweight
- Ruth Westbrook (1930–2016), cricketer
- Johnny Wheeler (1928–2019), footballer
- Dan Wheldon (1978–2011), 2005 and 2011 Indy 500 Winner, 2005 Indy Car Series Champion
- Jimmy White (born 1962), snooker player
- Edgar Whittaker, footballer
- Arthur Whittam, footballer
- Bradley Wiggins (born 1980), first British man to win the Tour de France
- Jonny Wilkinson (born 1979), world cup winning rugby footballer
- Joey Williams (1902–1978), footballer
- Charlie Wilson (1895–1971), footballer
- Justin Wilson (1978–2015), racing driver
- Vivian Woodward (1879–1954), footballer
- Billy Wright (1924–1994), footballer
- Vic Wright (1909–1964), footballer

== See also ==
- List of Cornish sportsmen and sportswomen
- List of England women Test cricketers
- List of England women Twenty20 International cricketers
