= Brae =

Brae means "hillside" or "river-bank" in Scots.

Brae may refer to:

== Places ==
- Brae, Shetland, a settlement in Scotland
- Brae Bay, Nunavut, Canada
- Brae Fell, a fell in the English Lake District
- Brae oilfield, a Scottish oil field in the North Sea
- Glen Brae, a Scottish baronial mansion in Vancouver, Canada

== People and fictional characters ==
- Billy Brae (1902–1968), Scottish footballer
- James Brae (fl. 1896–1897), English footballer
- June Brae (1917–2000), British ballet dancer
- Brae (rapper), one half of American hip-hop duo Joey Valence & Brae
- Brae Marrack, a character in the British soap opera Echo Beach

== Acronyms ==
- Boletín de la Real Academia Española
- British Antarctic Expedition (disambiguation) (BrAE)

== Other uses ==
- Brae (restaurant), Australia

== See also ==
- Braes (disambiguation)
