= Efrati =

Efrati (Hebrew: אפרתי) is a surname. Notable people with the surname include:

- Arnon Efrati (born 1952), Israeli sailor
- Leone Efrati (1916–1944), Italian boxer
- Moshe Efrati, Israeli cinematographer
- Seffy Efrati, bassist for Israeli alternative rock band Monica Sex
- Shai Efrati, professor of neuroscience at Tel Aviv University
- Yosef Efrati, Israeli politician
