= Whittam =

Whittam is an English surname. Notable people with the surname include:

- Sir Andreas Whittam Smith (1937–2025), British financial journalist and editor
- Arthur Whittam (fl. 1903–1904), English footballer
- Ben Whittam (1909–1995), Australian rules footballer
- Ernie Whittam (1911–1951), English footballer
- Ronald Whittam (1925–2023), British cell physiologist
- Thomas S. Whittam (1954–2008), American evolutionary biologist

== See also ==
- Witham, people with surnames Witham or Whitham
