= Witham (disambiguation) =

Witham is a town in Essex, England.

Witham may also refer to:

Places

- Witham on the Hill, Lincolnshire, England
- Witham St Hughs, Lincolnshire, England
- Witham Friary, Somerset, England
- Witham, UK Parliament constituency

People

- Witham (surname)

Other

- River Witham, a river in Lincolnshire, England

== See also ==
- North Witham, Lincolnshire, England
- South Witham, Lincolnshire, England
- Witham Field, an airport in Florida
- Withams, Virginia
- Wytham, a village in Oxfordshire, England
