= International Jewish Sports Hall of Fame =

Sports hall of fame in Netanya, Israel

- Formation: July 7, 1981; 45 years ago
- Type: Hall of Fame
- Region served: Worldwide
- President: Jed Margolis
- Founders: Joe Siegman, Alan Sherman
- Website: https://jewishsportshof.org/

The International Jewish Sports Hall of Fame (IJSHOF) (Hebrew: היכל התהילה הבינלאומי לספורט היהודי, romanized: Heychal Hatehila Habenleumi L’Sport Hayehudi) is the international hall of fame for Jewish athletes and special contributors to the world of sport.

The purpose of the IJSHOF is to honor Jewish individuals, worldwide, who have accomplished extraordinary achievements in sports and to honor those who have made significant contributions to society through sports.

The IJSHOF has inducted over 500 athletes and sportspersons representing over 30 countries. The Hall elects new honorees each year, with submissions due December 1 for votes for the following year, and a formal induction ceremony taking place several days prior to the Maccabiah Games every four years.

== History ==
The IJSHOF's predecessor, the Jewish Sports Hall of Fame, was founded in 1979 by Joseph M. Siegman, a television producer and writer from Beverly Hills, California, and pharmacist Alan Sherman of Rockville, Maryland. The original Hall of Fame included only American honorees.

In 1981, the International Jewish Sports Hall of Fame Museum was dedicated at the Wingate Institute in Netanya, Israel.

== Inductees ==
NB — * denotes a posthumous induction

Name	Country	Field	Year
Ruth Aarons*	US	Table tennis	2019
Harold Abrahams*	Great Britain	Track & field	1981
Jeff Agoos	US	Soccer	2022
Marv Albert	US	Media	2026
Amy Alcott	US	Golf	2000
Jo Aleh	New Zealand	Sailing	2017
Doc Alexander*	US	American football	1985
Mel Allen	US	Media	1980
Lyle Alzado*	US	American football	2008
Yael Arad	Israel	Judo	2010
Ray Arcel	US	Boxing	1992
Barry Asher	US	Bowling	2022
Gerald Ashworth	US	Track & Field	2001
Abe Attell*	US	Boxing	1983
Monte Attell*	US	Boxing	2015
Brad Ausmus	US	Baseball	2020
Red Auerbach	US	Basketball	1979
Alex Averbukh	Russia/Israel	Track & Field	2024
Ilya Averbukh	Russia	Figure skating	2015
Albert Axelrod	US	Fencing	1993
Arthur Baar	Austria	Association football	1982
Aron "Ali" Bacher	South Africa	Cricket	1991
William Bachrach*	US	Swimming coach	1994
Max Baer*	US	Boxing	2010
Rudi Ball*	Germany	Ice Hockey	2023
Sam Balter	US	Basketball/Media	1994
Viktor (Győző) Barna*	Hungary/Great Britain	Table tennis	1981
Herman Barron*	US	Golf	1993
István Barta*	Hungary	Water polo	1998
Harris Barton	US	American football	2009
Benny Bass*	US	Boxing	1994
Doug Beal	US	Volleyball	2001
Adriana Behar	Brazil	Beach volleyball	2006
Valeri Belenki	Azerbaijan/Germany	Gymnastics	2013
Semion Belits-Giman	Russia	Swimming	2017
Laszlo Bellak*	Hungary	Table tennis	1995
Louis "Lulu" Bender*	US	Basketball	2012
Carina Benninga	Netherlands	Field hockey	2000
Senda Berenson*	US	Basketball	1987
Jack Kid Berg*	Great Britain	Boxing	1993
Isaac Berger	US	Weightlifting	1980
Jay Berger	US	Tennis	2026
Samuel Berger*	US	Boxing	1985
Richard Bergmann*	Austria	Table tennis	1982
Robert Berland	US	Judo	2025
Chris Berman	USA	Media	2023
Jack Bernstein*	US	Boxing	2000
Kenny Bernstein	US	Auto racing	2006
Stanley "Skip" Bertman	USA	Baseball	2024
Gary Bettman	US	Ice hockey	2016
Sue Bird	USA	Basketball	2021
Morris "Whitey" Bimstein*	US	Boxing	2008
David Blatt	Israel/USA	Basketball	2023
Gérard Blitz*	Belgium	Swimming/Water polo	2021
Arthur Bluethenthal*	US	American football	1997
Walter Blum	US	Horse racing	1991
Ron Bolotin	Israel	Swimming	2024
Ryan Braun	USA	Baseball	2024
Shimshon Brokman	Israel	Sailing	2021
György Bródy*	Hungary	Water polo	1982
Tal Brody	Israel	Basketball	1996
Newsboy Brown (né David Montrose)*	USA	Boxing	2021
Larry Brown	US	Basketball	1990
Harry Boykoff*	US	Basketball	2013
Jozsef Braun*	Hungary	Soccer	2017
Hanoch Budin	Israel	Swimming	2025
Hy Buller*	Canada	Ice hockey	2017
Ellen Burka	Canada	Figure skating	2010
Petra Burka	Canada	Figure skating	2012
Angela Buxton	Great Britain	Tennis	1981
Alain Calmat	France	Figure skating	1987
Mike Cammalleri	Canada	Ice hockey	2024
Andrés Cantor	Argentina	Media	2025
Zefania Carmel*	Israel	Yachting	1982
Omri Casspi	Israel	Basketball	2026
Joe Choynski*	US	Boxing	1991
Robert Cohen	France	Boxing	1988
Sasha Cohen	USA	Figure skating	2019
Linda Cohn	USA	Media	2024
Lillian Copeland*	USA	Track & field	1979
Howard Cosell	USA	Media	1993
Harry Danning	USA	Baseball	2000
Pierre Darmon	France	Tennis	1997
Al Davis*	USA	American football	2014
Umberto De Morpurgo*	Italy	Tennis	1993
Eli Dershwitz	USA	Fencing	2024
Robert Dover	USA	Equestrian	2013
Yves Dreyfus*	France	Fencing	2025
Barney Dreyfuss*	USA	Baseball	1980
Deena Drossin Kastor	USA	Track & Field	2023
Carolina Duer	Israel	Boxing	2026
Dutch Olympians, 1928*	Netherlands	Gymnastics	1997
Julian Edelman	US	American football	2026
Ilona Elek-Schacherer*	Hungary	Fencing	2023
"Dutch Sam" Elias*	UK	Boxing	2011
Nikolai Epshteen	Russia	Ice hockey	2001
Charlotte Epstein*	USA	Swimming	1982
Jonathan "Yoni" Erlich	Israel	Tennis	2024
Anthony Ervin	USA	Swimming	2017
Helen Plaschinski Farca de Finkler	Mexico	Swimming	2025
László Fábián	Hungary	Canoeing	1996
Robert Fein*	Austria	Weightlifting	2026
Jackie Fields*	USA	Boxing	1979
Stan Fischler	US	Media	2025
Herbert Flam*	USA	Tennis	1992
Alfred Flatow*	Germany	Gymnastics	1981
Gustav Flatow*	Germany	Gymnastics	1989
Nat Fleischer*	USA	Media	1985
Dezso Földes*	Hungary	Fencing	2026
Yuri Foreman	US/Israel	Boxing	2026
Myriam Fox-Jerusalmi	France	Canoeing	2018
Noemie Fox	Australia	Media	2026
John Frank	USA	American football	2023
Bobby Frankel*	USA	Horse racing	2011
Gal Fridman	Israel	Sailing	2005
Eitan Friedlander	Israel	Sailing	2021
Benny Friedman*	USA	American football	1979
Max Friedman*	USA	Basketball	1994
Jenő Fuchs*	Hungary	Fencing	1982
Tamás Gábor	Hungary	Fencing	1996
Grigori Gamarnik*	Ukraine	Wrestling	2020
János Garay*	Hungary	Fencing	1990
Mitch Gaylord	US	Gymnastics	1988
Aaron "Okey" Geffen	South Africa	Rugby union	1998
Leonid Geishtor	Russia/Belarus	Canoeing	2018
Dr. Oszkár Gerde*	Hungary	Fencing	1989
Sid Gillman	US	American football	1991
Arthur A. Gold	United Kingdom	Contributor	1987
Marshall Goldberg	US	American football	1980
Charles "Buckets" Goldenberg*	US	American football	1993
Israel Charley Goldman*	US	Boxing	1999
Abe Goldstein*	US	Boxing	2016
Leah Goldstein	Canada/Israel	Cycling/Kickboxing	2025
Margie Goldstein-Engle	US	Equestrian	2009
Reuven "Ruby" Goldstein*	US	Boxing	1995
Sándor Gombos*	Hungary	Fencing	1997
Aleksandr Gomelsky	USSR	Basketball	1981
Sid Gordon*	US	Baseball	2010
Maria Gorokhovskaya*	USSR	Gymnastics	1991
Brian Gottfried	US	Tennis	1999
Eddie Gottlieb*	US	Basketball	1980
Jim Grabb	US	Tennis	2013
Milton Green	US	Track & field	1997
Shawn Green	US	Baseball	2014
Hank Greenberg	US	Baseball	1979
Sherman Greenfeld	Canada	Racquetball	2015
Abie Grossfeld	US	Gymnastics	1992
Gary Gubner	US	Track & field	2001
George Gulack	US	Gymnastics	1984
Boris Maksovich Gurevich	USSR	Wrestling	1987
Boris Mikhailovich Gurevich	USSR	Wrestling	1982
Béla Guttmann	Hungary	Association football	1981
Ludwig "Poppa" Guttmann*	Germany/Great Britain	Contributor	1981
Andrea Gyarmati	Hungary	Swimming	2021
Baruch Hagai	Israel	Wheelchair basketball	2013
Alfréd Hajos-Guttmann*	Hungary	Swimming	1981
SC Hakoah Wien	Austria	Association football	1982
Alphonse Halimi	France/Algeria	Boxing	1989
Willie Harmatz	US	Horse Racing	1999
Harry Harris*	US	Boxing	1996
Sigmund Harris*	USA	American football	1994
Cecil Hart*	Canada	Ice hockey	1992
Ben Hatskin*	Canada	Ice hockey	2019
Lydia Hatuel-Czukermann	Israel	Fencing	2026
Lew Hayman*	Canada	Canadian football	2004
Ladislav Hecht*	Czechoslovakia	Tennis	2005
Julie Heldman	USA	Tennis	2001
Ben Helfgott	Great Britain	Weightlifting	1995
Lilli Henoch*	Germany	Track & field	1990
Otto Herschmann*	Austria	Swimming	1989
Victor Hershkowitz	USA	Handball	1991
Nikolaus Hirschl*	Austria	Wrestling	1993
Abigail Hoffman	Canada	Track & field	2024
Marty Hogan	USA	Racquetball	1996
Marshall Holman	USA	Bowling	2006
Nat Holman	USA	Basketball	1979
Ken Holtzman	USA	Baseball	1995
William "Red" Holzman	USA	Basketball	1988
Sarah Hughes	USA	Figure skating	2005
Maria Itkina	USSR	Track & field	1991
Jerry Izenberg	USA	Media	2014
Joe Jacobi	USA	Canoeing	2005
Gary Jacobs	Scotland	Boxing	2025
Hirsch Jacobs*	USA	Horse racing	1979
Jimmy Jacobs	USA	Handball	1979
Sada Jacobson	USA	Fencing	2012
Irving Jaffee	USA	Speed skating	1979
Allan Jay	Great Britain	Fencing	1985
Ben Jeby*	USA	Boxing	2012
Endre Kabos	Hungary	Fencing	1986
Giselle Kañevsky	Argentina	Field hockey	2024
Rena Kanokogi (aka Rusty Glickman)*	USA	Judo	2016
Jonathan Kaplan	South Africa	Rugby union	2004
Louis "Kid" Kaplan*	USA	Boxing	1986
Károly Kárpáti	Hungary	Wrestling	1994
Gennadi Karponosov	Russia	Figure skating	2001
Elias Katz*	Finland	Track & field	1981
Ágnes Keleti (Klein)	Hungary	Gymnastics	1981
Abel Kiviat	USA	Track & field	1984
Ralph Klein*	Israel	Basketball	2025
Traute Kleinova*	Czechoslovakia	Table tennis	1994
Michael Klinger	Australia	Cricket	2021
Ilana Kloss	South Africa	Tennis	2010
Erwin Kohn*	Austria/Argentina	Table tennis	2012
Béla Komjádi (HU)*	Hungary	Water polo	1992
Zsuzsa (Suzy) Körmöczy*	Hungary	Tennis	2007
Lee-El Korzits	Israel	Sailing	2017
Sandy Koufax	USA	Baseball	1979
Lenny Krayzelburg	USA	Swimming	2005
Aaron Krickstein	USA	Tennis	2024
Solly Krieger*	USA	Boxing	1997
Grigori Kriss	USSR	Fencing	1989
Lily Kronberger*	Hungary	Figure skating	1983
Daniela Krukower	Argentina	Judo	2013
Alfred Kuchevsky*	USSR/Russia	Ice hockey	2011
Abraham Kurland*	Denmark	Wrestling	2025
Shaul Ladany	Israel	Track & field	2012
Rudy LaRusso	USA	Basketball	2014
Henry Laskau	USA	Track & field	1996
Lydia Lazarov	Israel	Yachting	1982
Keren Leibovitch	Israel	Swimming	2008
Benny Leonard*	USA	Boxing	1979
Battling (Barney Lebrowitz) Levinsky*	USA	Boxing	1982
Edward L. Levy*	Great Britain	Weightlifting	1988
Marv Levy	USA	American football	1998
Fred Lewis	USA	Handball	2011
Harry Lewis*	USA	Boxing	2002
Ted "Kid" Lewis*	Great Britain	Boxing	1983
Jason Lezak	USA	Swimming	2006
Nancy Lieberman	US	Basketball	2026
Mike Lieberthal	USA	Baseball	2016
Mort Lindsey	USA	Bowling	1997
Alexandre Lippmann*	France	Fencing	1984
Harry Litwack	USA	Basketball	1980
Benny Lom*	USA	American football	1996
Long Island University *	USA	Basketball team of 1935–36	2018
Sid Luckman	USA	American football	1979
Yuri Lyapkin	USSR/Russia	Ice hockey	2020
Tatiana Lysenko	Ukraine	Gymnastics	2002
Joe Magidsohn*	USA	American football	1999
Gyula Mandl*	Hungary	Association football	1982
Walentin Mankin	USSR	Yachting	1987
Nicolas Massú	Chile	Tennis	2016
Al McCoy*	USA	Boxing	1989
Hugo Meisl*	Austria	Association football	1981
Fania Melnik	USSR	Track & field	1984
Daniel Mendoza*	Great Britain	Boxing	1981
Ferenc Mező*	Hungary	Contributor	1986
Al Michaels	US	Media	2026
Mark Midler	USSR	Fencing	1983
Walter Miller*	USA	Horse racing	1983
Ron Mix	USA	American football	1980
Ivor Montagu	Great Britain	Table tennis	1984
Samuel Mosberg*	USA	Boxing	1985
Merrill Moses	USA	Water polo	2023
Armand Mouyal	France	Fencing	1988
Charles "Buddy" Myer*	US	Baseball	1992
Lon Myers*	US	Track & field	1980
Alfred Nakache*	France	Swimming	1993
Paul Neumann*	Austria	Swimming	1984
Ed Newman	US	American football	1995
Harry Newman	US	American football	1992
Tzvi Nishri (Orloff)*	Israel	Contributor	1981
Syd Nomis	South Africa	Rugby union	1999
Grigori Novak*	USSR	Weightlifting	1985
Fred Oberlander	Canada	Wrestling	1991
Tom Okker	Netherlands	Tennis	2003
Bob Olin*	US	Boxing	2008
Donna Geils Orender	US	Basketball	2015
Ivan Osiier*	Denmark	Fencing	1986
Bruce Pearl	US	Basketball	2026
Shahar Pe'er	Israel	Tennis	2025
Victor "Young" Perez*	Tunisia	Boxing	1986
Attila Petschauer*	Hungary	Fencing	1985
Philadelphia Sphas	US	Basketball	1996
Lip Pike*	US	Baseball	1985
Zhanna Pintusevich-Block	Ukraine	Track & field	2009
Maurice Podoloff*	US	Basketball	1989
Sarah Poewe	Germany/South Africa	Swimming	2025
Daniel Prenn	Germany	Tennis	1981
Morgan Pressel	US	Golf	2026
Myer Prinstein*	US	Track & field	1982
Yakiv Punkin*	USSR/Ukraine	Wrestling	2018
Aly Raisman	US	Gymnastics	2013
Mark Rakita	USSR	Fencing	1988
Andy Ram	Israel	Tennis	2024
Marilyn Ramenofsky	US	Swimming	1988
Mauri Rose*	US	Auto racing	2007
Al Rosen	US	Baseball	1980
Coon Rosen	US	Softball	1993
Mel Rosen	US	Track & field	2004
Allen Rosenberg	US	Rowing	1994
Charlie Rosenberg*	US	Boxing	1990
Wilf Rosenberg	South Africa	Rugby union and Rugby league	1994
Maxie Rosenbloom*	US	Boxing	1984
Leonard Rosenbluth	US	Basketball	2003
Albert Rosenfeld*	Australia	Rugby league	2006
Fanny Rosenfeld*	Canada	Track & field	1982
Barney Ross*	US	Boxing	1979
Victor Ross*	US	Lacrosse	1995
Mark Roth	US	Bowling	1992
Esther Roth-Sachmarov	Israel	Track & field	2013
Leon Rotman	Romania	Canoeing	1981
Emília Rotter	Hungary	Figure skating	1995
Angelica Rozeanu*	Romania	Table tennis	1981
Louis Rubenstein*	Canada	Figure skating	1981
Zipporah Rubin-Rosenbaum	Israel	Paralympian	2026
Mendy Rudolph*	USA	Basketball	1989
Moran Samuel	Israel	Rowing	2023
Steve Sandler	USA	Handball	2015
Abe Saperstein*	USA	Basketball	1979
Red Sarachek*	US	Basketball	2026
Miklós Sárkány	Hungary	Water polo	1990
Richard Savitt	USA	Tennis	1979
Danny Schayes	US	Basketball	2026
Dolph Schayes	USA	Basketball	1979
Jody Scheckter	South Africa	Auto racing	1983
Sol Schiff*	USA	Table tennis	2020
Fred Schmertz	USA	Track and field	1989
Mathieu Schneider	USA	Ice hockey	2014
Isadore "Corporal Izzy" Schwartz*	USA	Boxing	1998
Mitchell Schwartz	USA	American football	2024
Diego Schwartzman	Argentina	Tennis	2026
Barney Sedran*	USA	Basketball	1989
Anna Segal	Australia	Skiing	2020
Allan "Bud" Selig	USA	Baseball	2014
Arie Selinger	Israel	Volleyball	2016
Eugene Selznick	USA	Volleyball	2002
Sergey Sharikov	Russia	Fencing	2003
Doron Shaziri	Israel	Shooting	2026
Yelena Shushunova	USSR	Gymnastics	2005
Michael Sigel	US	Billiards	2011
Al Singer*	US	Boxing	2006
Anna Sipos*	Hungary	Table tennis	1996
Irina Slutskaya	Russia	Figure skating	2009
Oren Smadja	Israel	Judo	2025
Harold Solomon	US	Tennis	2004
Jack Solomons*	Great Britain	Boxing	2004
Moe Spahn*	US	Basketball	1993
Mordechai Spiegler	Israel	Soccer	2023
Frank Spellman	US	Weightlifting	1983
Don Spero	US	Rowing	1993
Mark Spitz	US	Swimming	1979
David Stern	US	Basketball	1998
Georges Stern*	France	Horse racing	1993
Steve Stone	US	Baseball	2004
Dwight Stones	US	Track	2023
Amar'e Stoudemire	US/Israel	Basketball	2025
Joel Stransky	South Africa	Rugby union	2009
Earl Strom*	US	Basketball	2008
Kerri Strug	US	Gymnastics	2000
Miklos Szabados*	Hungary	Table tennis	1987
Éva Székely	Hungary	Swimming	1981
Irena Szewińska (née Kirszenstein)	Poland	Track & field	1981
László Szollás*	Hungary	Figure skating	1996
Sid Tanenbaum*	US	Basketball	1997
Brian Teacher	US	Tennis	2014
Eliot Teltscher	US	Tennis	2009
Judit Temes*	Hungary	Swimming	2016
Lew Tendler*	US	Boxing	1992
Leah Thall-Neuberger*	US	Table tennis	1999
Thelma "Tybie" Thall-Sommer	US	Table tennis	2017
Andre Tippett	US	American football	2026
David "Pep" Tobey*	USA	Basketball	1995
Allen Tolmich	USA	Track & field	2002
Shaun Tomson	South Africa	Surfing	1995
Gyula Török	Hungary	Boxing	2018
Dara Torres	USA	Swimming	2005
David Tyshler*	USSR/Russia	Fencing	2015
Galina Urbanovich*	USSR	Gymnastics	2016
Sheila van Damm*	Great Britain	Auto racing	2019
Eduard Vinokurov	USSR	Fencing	2007
Albert Von Tilzer	USA	Baseball	2017
Garrett Weber-Gale	USA	Swimming	2015
Ellen Weinberg-Hughes	USA	Ice hockey	2024
Richárd Weisz*	Hungary	Wrestling	1983
Matt Wells*	Great Britain	Boxing	2007
Sylvia Wene	USA	Bowling	1979
Lajos Werkner*	Hungary	Fencing	1999
Sara Whalen	USA	Soccer	2024
Ben Wildman-Tobriner	USA	Swimming	2018
Jessica Wilk	USA	Lacrosse	2020
Henry Wittenberg*	USA	Wrestling	1979
Wallace "Wally" Wolf*	USA	Swimming, Water polo	2014
Kevin Youkilis	USA	Baseball	2019
Young Dutch Sam* (Samuel Evans)	Great Britain	Boxing	2018
Chagai Zamir	Israel	Volleyball	1998
Max Zaslofsky*	US	Basketball	1983
Ariel Ze'evi	Israel	Judo	2023
Linoy Ashram	Israel	Rhythmic gymnastics	2022
Miki Berkovich	Israel	Basketball	2022
Artem Dolgopyat	Israel	Gymnastics	2022
Thelma Eisen	US	Baseball	2022
Jessica Fox	Australia	Canoeing	2022
Brad Gilbert	US	Tennis	2022
Ernie Grunfeld	US	Basketball	2022
Ian Kinsler	US/Israel	Baseball	2022

== Pillar of Achievement ==
The Pillar of Achievement recognizes Jewish men and women who have made significant contributions to sports and to the world community through sports.

Name	Country	Field	Year
Jesse Abramson*	US	Media	1995
Jeff Agoos	US	Soccer	2022
Maury Allen	US	Media	2009
Yehoshua Alouf	Israel	Official/Administrator	1981
Barry Asher	US	Bowling	2022
Linoy Ashram	Israel	Rhythmic Gymnastics	2022
Robert Atlasz	Israel	Official/Administrator	1986
Baruch Bagg	Israel	Official/Administrator	1981
Moe Berg	US	Baseball/Patriot	1983
Gretel Bergmann	Germany	Track & Field	1980
Ira Berkow	US	Media	2006
Miki Berkovich	Israel	Basketball	2022
Dr. Richard Blum	Germany	Official/Administrator	1983
Alfréd Brüll	Hungary	Official/Administrator	1995
John Brunswick	US	Bowling	1996
Daniel Bukantz	US	Official/Administrator	2001
Si Burick*	US	Media	2000
Murray Chass	US	Media	2012
Haskell Cohen	US	Official/Media	1991
Dan Daniel*	US	Media	1996
Bill Davidson*	US	Basketball	2012
Massimo Della Pergola	Italy	Official/Media	1989
Judith Deutsch	Austria	Swimming	1981
Artum Dolgopyat	Israel	Gymnastics	2022
Lajos Dömény-Deutsch*	Hungary	Official/Administrator	1995
Leo Donáth	Hungary	Swimming	1999
Leone Efrati	Italy	Boxing	2000
Thelma Eisen	US	Baseball	2022
Al Munro Elias*	US	Media	2003
Red Fisher	Canada	Media	1999
Jessica Fox	Australia	Canoeing	2022
György Szepesi (né Friedländer)	Hungary	Media	1998
Ian Froman	South Africa	Tennis	1991
Harry L. Getz	South Africa	Official/Administrator	1985
Brad Gilbert	US	Tennis	2022
Emmanuel Gill	Israel	Official/Administrator	1983
Harry Glickman	US	Official/Administrator	1995
Marty Glickman	US	Media	1996
Chaim Glovinsky	Israel	Official/Administrator	1982
Julius Goldman	Canada	Basketball	1999
Kenneth Gradon	Great Britain	Official/Administrator	2002
Al Greenberg	US	Media	1993
Bud Greenspan	US	Media	1995
Ernie Grunfeld	US	Basketball	2022
Pierre Guildesgame	Great Britain	Official/Administrator	1985
Allen Guttmann	US	Media	2013
Sidney Halter	Canada	Football	2005
Arthur Hanak	Israel	Archivist/Administrator	1994
Lester Harrison	US	Basketball	1991
Gladys Heldman	US	Tennis/Media	1989
Harry Henshel	US	Official/Administrator	1983
Jerome Holtzman*	US	Media	2005
Joseph Inbar	Israel	Official/Administrator	1989
Mike Jacobs	US	Boxing	1993
Hank Kaplan	US	Media	2004
Max Kase*	US	Media	1986
Ferenc Kemény	Hungary	Official/Administrator	1996
Ian Kinsler	US/Israel	Baseball	2022
Leonard Koppett	US	Media	2011
Kurt Lamm	US	Soccer	1993
Harold Landesberg	US	Official/Administrator	1983
Fred Lebow	US	Official/Administrator	1994
Dr. Herman Leweller	US	Official/Administrator	1987
A.J. Liebling*	US	Media	1998
Bill Lippy	US	Official/Administrator	1997
Willy Meisl*	Germany/Great Britain	Media	1986
Marvin Miller	US	Official/Administrator	2001
Barney Nagler*	US	Media	1992
Ben Olan	US	Media	1994
Murray Olderman	US	Media	1997
Charles Ornstein*	US	Official/Administrator	1984
Orna Ostfeld	Israel	Basketball	2009
Bernard Postal*	US	Media	1986
Shirley Povich	US	Media	1992
Julia Jones Pugliese*	US	Fencing	2002
Jimmie Reese*	US	Baseball	1995
Joe Reichler*	US	Media	2008
Harold U. Ribalow*	US	Media	2009
Ed Sabol	US	Media	1996
Al Schacht*	US	Baseball	2008
Dick Schaap*	US	Media	2003
Eric Seelig*	Germany	Boxing	1992
Joseph Shane	US	Official/Administrator	2002
Jesse Silver	US	Media	1989
Roy Silver	US	Media	1989
Harry Simmons*	Canada	Official/Administrator	2007
Emmanuel Simon*	Israel	Official/Administrator	1983
Dr. Uri Simri	Israel	Official/Administrator	1991
Margaredt Sonnenfeld	Israel	Official/Coach	1997
Oscar State*	Great Britain	Official/Weightlifting	1989
Louis Stein*	US	Official/Bowling	1992
Bill Stern*	US	Media	2001
Sam Stoller*	US	Track & Field	2007
Artur Takač	Yugoslavia	Official/Administrator	1989
Sam Taub*	US	Media	1993
Irving Ungerman	Canada	Boxing	1994
Ben Weider	Canada	Body Building	1992
Joe Weider	Canada	Body Building	1992
Chaim Wein*	Israel	Official/Administrator	1986
Joseph Yekuteli*	Israel	Official/Administrator	1982
Aviezer Yellin*	Israel	Official/Administrator	1984
Paul Ziffren*	US	Official/Administrator	1993
Harold O. Zimman*	US	Official/Media	1991

== Lifetime Achievement ==
In 1992, the International Jewish Sports Hall of Fame initiated its Lifetime Achievement Award which has been awarded annually honoring those individuals who have made significant contributions to the State of Israel and society through sports.

Year	Name	Location
1992	Sam Sharrow	Miami Beach, Florida, United States
1993	David Pincus	(United States) Philadelphia, Pennsylvania, US
1994	Karl Ribstein	Munich, Germany
1995	(Canada) Monty Hall	Beverly Hills, California, United States
1996	Yariv Oren	Netanya, Israel
1997	Alan Sherman	Potomac, Maryland, United States
1998	Moshe Rashkes	Ramat Gan, Israel
1999	(Germany) Fred Worms, OBE	(United Kingdom) London, England, UK
2000	Joseph Luttenberg	Afeka, Israel
2001	Robert Spivak	(United States) Philadelphia, Pennsylvania, US
2002	Uri Afek	Netanya, Israel
2003	Lester Fein	(United States) Vernon, New Jersey, US
2004	Shimon Mizrahi	Tel Aviv, Israel
2005	Sidney Greenberg	Toronto, Canada
2006	Alex Gilady	Israel
2007	Joyce Eisenberg-Keefer	(United States) Los Angeles, California, US
2008	R. Stephen Rubin, OBE	(United Kingdom) London, England, UK
2009	Michael Kevezahi	Tel Aviv, Israel
2010	Moshe Teumim	Tel Aviv, Israel
2011	Robert Levy	(United States) Philadelphia, Pennsylvania, US
2012	Michel Grun	Antwerp, Belgium
2013	William Steerman	(United States) Philadelphia, Pennsylvania, US
2014	Harry Swimmer	(United States) Charlotte, North Carolina, US
2015	Robert Kraft	(United States) Brookline, Massachusetts, US
2016	Dr. Uri Schaefer	Tel Aviv, Israel
2017	Victor Vaisman	Buenos Aires, Argentina
2018	Joseph Siegman	(United States) Los Angeles, California, US
2019	Roy Salomon	Montreal, Canada
2020	Sylvan Adams	Tel Aviv, Israel
2021	Henry Samueli	Israel
2023	Stuart Weitzman	USA
2025	Jeff Bukantz	USA
2025	Amir Peled	Israel
2025	Lori Komisar	USA
2025	Ishie Gitlin	Mexico

== Chairperson’s Award of Excellence ==
Year	Name	Field	Location
2010	Samuel P. Spron	Tennis	New York City, United States
2010	(South Africa) Teddy Kaplan	Weightlifting	Israel
2012	Reuven Heller	Disabled sports	Israel
2013	Zohar Sharon	Champion blind golfer	Israel
2015	Anita Shkedi	Pioneer in therapeutic horse riding	Israel/Great Britain
2016	Arie Rosenzweig	Sports executive	Israel
2016	Lenny Silberman	Management and Administration	United States
2021	Stuart Lustigman	Sports executive	United Kingdom
2022	Eyal Tiberger	Executive Director, Maccabi World Union	Israel
2023	Ephraim Moxson and Shel Wallman	Editors, Jewish Sports Review	United States
2024	Gilad Weingarten	Broadcaster	Israel
2025	Jed Margolis	President, International Jewish Sports Hall of Fame	United States
2025	Yael Arad	Judo	Israel

== President’s Global Leadership Award ==
Year	Name	Field	Location
2025	Tal Brody	Basketball	Israel
2025	Oudi Recanati		USA/Israel

== Global Tikkun Olam Award ==
Year	Name	Field	Location
2025	Lord Mann		United Kingdom

== See also ==
- List of Jews in sports
- Jewish Sports Review
- National Jewish Museum Sports Hall of Fame
- Southern California Jewish Sports Hall of Fame
