= Steve Sandler =

Steve Sandler may refer to:

- Steven Sandler, American inventor
- Steve Sandler (handballer), American handball player
