= Frank O'Farrell =

Irish footballer and manager (1927–2022)

Personal information
- Full name: Francis O'Farrell
- Date of birth: 9 October 1927
- Place of birth: Blackpool, Cork, Ireland
- Date of death: 6 March 2022 (aged 94)
- Position: Wing half

Youth career
- Nicholas Rovers
- Clapton Celtic
- Western Rovers

Senior career*
Years	Team	Apps	(Gls)
1947–1948	Cork United	?	(?)
1948–1956	West Ham United	197	(6)
1956–1961	Preston North End	118	(3)
1961	Weymouth	?	(?)

International career
1952–1959	Republic of Ireland	9	(2)

Managerial career
- 1961–1965: Weymouth
- 1965–1968: Torquay United
- 1968–1971: Leicester City
- 1971–1972: Manchester United
- 1973–1974: Cardiff City
- 1974–1976: Iran
- 1976–1977: Torquay United
- 1980: Al-Shaab
- 1981–1982: Torquay United
- * Club domestic league appearances and goals

Francis O'Farrell (9 October 1927 – 6 March 2022) was an Irish football player and manager. He played as a wing half for Cork United, West Ham United and Preston North End. He made over 300 appearances in the Football League before joining Weymouth as player-manager. He went on to manage Torquay United (three stints), Leicester City, Manchester United, Cardiff City, Iran and Al-Shaab. He played for the Republic of Ireland national team, making nine appearances between 1952 and 1959.

== Early life ==
Born in Lower Dublin Hill in Blackpool, a suburb of Cork, O'Farrell lived on Friars Road, in the Turners Cross area of the city. His grand-uncle was renowned road bowling player John "Buck" McGrath. He was raised a Catholic and attended Scoil Chríost Rí. He played Gaelic football and captained the school team to its first trophy win in 1941. He also played the association code for local teams Nicholas Rovers, Clapton Celtic and at Western Rovers alongside the brother of Noel Cantwell, with whom he would later reunite as a teammate at West Ham United. At the age of 16, he started working on the railways and wanted to be a train driver, like his father. He worked as a fireman on the Dublin–Cork railway line.

== Club career ==
A left half, O'Farrell started his playing career with League of Ireland club Cork United, replacing Tommy Moroney in the first team after his departure to West Ham United in 1947. Playing as a semi-professional, he supplemented his earnings with his work on the railways, earning £3 a week for each. In January 1948, after being spotted by West Ham scout Ben Ives, O'Farrell followed Moroney to the Upton Park club for a fee of £3,000. O'Farrell himself received a £1,000 fee for the transfer. He made over 50 appearances for the reserves before breaking into the first team. His debut came on 28 September 1950 in a 2–0 defeat of Colchester United in the Essex Professional Cup. His Football League debut followed in November 1950 in a 4–1 defeat away to Notts County. He made 18 league appearances in his first season but became a regular in the 1951–52 and 1952–53 seasons. He was one of a number of West Ham players that would meet at Cassettari's Café to discuss tactics. He played for West Ham in seven seasons and made 213 appearances, scoring eight goals.

In November 1956, O'Farrell left for Preston North End in a straight swap deal involving Eddie Lewis. Replacing Ray Evans in the team, he scored on his home debut, a 20-yard strike against Manchester City. Playing alongside Tom Finney, he played 17 league matches before his first loss with the club. He would then miss over a month of football after treatment for a nosebleed which caused him to lose around four pints of blood (he experienced a recurrence of the problem in the following season). His first season with Preston brought a third-place finish and he was still with the Lancashire club when they finished runners-up to Wolverhampton Wanderers in Division One at the end of the 1957–58 season. In the same season O'Farrell's former teammates at West Ham finished as Second Division champions, securing their promotion to the First Division, which he had strived to help achieve. In all, O'Farrell made 129 appearances for Preston, scoring four goals.

He retired from professional football in 1961, close to 34 years of age, after a second operation to remove cartilage.

== International career ==
O'Farrell won the first of nine full international caps for Ireland against Austria in Vienna on 7 May 1952, in a 6–0 defeat. In his next international game, also against Austria, O'Farrell scored the first of his two international goals as Ireland won 4–0 at Dalymount Park, Dublin. His next game saw his second and last international goal, as Ireland lost 5–3 to France in a qualifying game for the 1954 World Cup. He played infrequently over the next six years before making his ninth and last international appearance on 10 May 1959 in a 4–0 defeat by Czechoslovakia at Tehelne Pole Stadion in Bratislava.

== Managerial career ==
=== Weymouth and Torquay United ===
On 20 June 1961, O'Farrell became player-manager at Southern League team Weymouth. He was paid £25 a week for the role, which was £5 more than he had been earning as a Football League player at Preston. In 1961–62, he oversaw Weymouth's passage to the fourth round of the FA Cup, where they were beaten by his old club Preston North End. After a runners-up spot in 1963–64, he led the club to their first Southern League championship in 1964–65, also reaching the final of the Southern League Cup that season.

In May 1965, he became manager of Torquay United, replacing Eric Webber. He took the Gulls to promotion in his first season in charge and followed this with seventh- and fourth-place finishes in the Third Division in the following two seasons. While Torquay manager he returned to West Ham to sign a number of players, including John Bond, Ken Brown and Bill Kitchener.

=== Leicester City ===
In December 1968, O'Farrell took over Leicester City. He appointed former West Ham teammate Malcolm Musgrove as his assistant. Leicester were near the bottom of the First Division table when he was appointed and were relegated at the end of the season, but O'Farrell led them to the 1969 FA Cup Final, which they lost 1–0 to Manchester City. The following season brought a third-place finish, and 1970–71 saw the club win the Second Division and return to the top tier.

=== Manchester United ===
On 1 July 1971, he took over at Manchester United, having been confirmed in the role on 8 June 1971. He replaced Matt Busby, who had selected him for the role, signing a five-year contract worth £15,000 a year. Musgrove was again his assistant. His arrival came just three years after United had won the European Cup, but the side had posted eighth-place finishes in the First Division in the previous two seasons before O'Farrell's arrival.

O'Farrell's tenure started well, with Bobby Charlton, Denis Law and George Best playing well and the club, 10 points clear at one stage, losing just one of their first 14 league games. O'Farrell was named Manager of the Month for September and the club topped the table for the first time in three years in October. After being top of the league at Christmas, Best failed to attend training throughout January and United scored only three goals in their first eight games of the year, losing the first seven. O'Farrell's impersonal approach, whereby every player had to schedule an appointment to see him, did not help morale. O'Farrell signed Martin Buchan for a club-record fee of £125,000, as well as Ian Storey-Moore, who scored in all of United's five league wins in the second half of the season. Once again, United ended the season in eighth place.

Further problems with Best led to a two-week suspension for the player and he continued to miss training sessions during the 1972–73 season. Forwards Wyn Davies and Ted MacDougall were signed in September 1972, bringing O'Farrell's spending in the previous six months to £500,000. On 6 December, it was announced that Best would be transfer listed. On 16 December, United lost 5–0 to Crystal Palace, with Don Rogers scoring twice, and three days after the match, with the club third-from-bottom in the league, O'Farrell was sacked after 18 months in the role. He was replaced at Old Trafford by Tommy Docherty. O'Farrell remains as the only Irish manager in Manchester United's history. His sacking resulted in O'Farrell suing the club over unpaid wages and he was forced to sign on at the local labour exchange while the dispute was settled. The club ultimately settled out-of-court and O'Farrell received "about £17,000".

=== Cardiff and Iran ===
He became manager of Cardiff City in November 1973, but in April 1974 quit to take the manager's post with the Iranian national team. He began his tenure with seven consecutive wins, leading them to the gold medal at the 1974 Asian Games and qualification for the Montreal Olympics. In January 2006, O'Farrell was invited to Iran to attend a ceremony in honour of Persepolis' former players, along with Alan Rogers.

=== Returns to Torquay, and Al-Shaab ===
On 29 November 1976, O'Farrell returned to Torquay United as manager, replacing Malcolm Musgrove. He remained with the club as consultant manager when Mike Green was appointed player-manager in March 1977. In 1980, he joined United Arab Emirati club Al-Shaab. He became Torquay manager again when Green left the club in May 1981, but once again relinquished the position the following year, this time in July 1982 on the appointment of Bruce Rioch. He worked as general manager until his retirement in 1983, aged 55.

== Personal life ==
After his retirement, O'Farrell continued to live in Torquay. In 1993, he worked as a scout for Everton and Bolton Wanderers. In later life, he ran a nursing home in Devon with his wife, Ann. He had been active in church affairs and presided over the local Conference of the Society of Saint Vincent de Paul. In 2011, his autobiography All Change at Old Trafford was published. In 2018 he lived in Devon, and cared for his wife.

O'Farrell died on 6 March 2022, at the age of 94. At the time of his death he was the oldest living former West Ham United player.

== Career statistics ==
Appearances and goals by national team and year
National team	Year	Apps	Goals
Republic of Ireland	1952	1	0
Republic of Ireland	1953	2	2
Republic of Ireland	1955	3	0
Republic of Ireland	1956	1	0
Republic of Ireland	1957	1	0
Republic of Ireland	1959	1	0
Total		9	2

Scores and results list Republic of Ireland's goal tally first, score column indicates score after each O'Farrell goal.

List of international goals scored by Frank O'Farrell
No.	Date	Venue	Opponent	Score	Result	Competition	Ref.
1	25 March 1953	Dalymount Park, Dublin, Ireland	Austria	4–0	4–0	Friendly	
2	4 October 1953	Dalymount Park, Dublin, Ireland	France	3–5	3–5	1954 FIFA World Cup qualification	

== Managerial statistics ==
Team	From	To	Record				
Team	From	To	G	W	L	D	Win %
Torquay United	1 May 1965	31 December 1968	162	76	52	34	46.91
Leicester City	1 December 1968	30 June 1971	114	51	28	35	44.74
Manchester United	1 July 1971	19 December 1972	81	30	27	24	37.04
Cardiff City	13 November 1973	30 April 1974	27	8	10	9	29.63
Iran	September 1974	September 1975	15	10	3	2	66.67
Torquay United	28 November 1976	1 March 1977	13	4	7	1	30.77
Al-Shaab	1980	1980	10	6	3	1	60
Torquay United	1 June 1981	30 June 1982	46	14	19	13	30.43

== Honours ==
=== Manager ===
Weymouth

- Southern League: 1964–65

Torquay United

- Fourth Division: 1965–66

Leicester City

- Second Division: 1970–71

Cardiff City

- Welsh Cup: 1974

Iran

- Asia Games: 1974
