= Robert Lowe (disambiguation) =

Robert Lowe (1811–1892) was a British statesman.

Robert Lowe may also refer to:

- Rob Lowe (born 1964), American actor
- Robert Lowe (athlete) (born 1945), British Paralympian
- Robert Lowe (singer), American heavy metal singer
- Robert Aiki Aubrey Lowe a.k.a. Lichens (born 1975)
- Robert Lowe (Austrian footballer)
- Robert Lowe (English footballer), English footballer
- Robert Daniel Lowe (born 1985), English stage, television and film actor
- Bobby Lowe (1865–1951), American baseball player around the turn of the 20th century
- Bobby Lowe (karateka) (1929–2011), American Kyokushin karate practitioner

== See also ==
- Robert Low (disambiguation)
- Robert Loe (born 1991), New Zealand basketball player
- Rupert Lowe (born 1957), British politician
- Robert Lowes (disambiguation)
