= Witham (surname) =

Witham is a place in England.

Witham is also a surname, as is Whitham. Notable people with these surnames include:

- Dick Witham (1915–1999), professional soccer player
- George Witham (1655–1725), English Roman Catholic bishop
- Henry Witham (1779–1844), English paleontologist
- Michael Leonard Witham, American singer, songwriter, and musician
- Myron E. Witham (1880–1973), American football player, coach of football and baseball
- Robert Witham (1667–1738), English biblical scholar
- Thomas Witham (c.1420–1489), English Chancellor of the Exchequer under Kings Henry VI and Edward IV
- William Witham, (fl.1450–1472), English clergyman

Whitham

- Charles Whitham (1873–1940), author of book on Western Tasmania
- Elena Whitham (born 1974), British politician
- Gerald Beresford Whitham (1927–2014), British–born American mathematician
- Jack Whitham (born 1946), English (soccer) footballer
- James Whitham (born 1966), English motorcycle racer
- Jeff Whitham, Republican member of the Kansas House of Representatives
- John Whitham (1881–1952), Australian Army officer
- Michael Whitham (1867–1924), English (soccer) footballer
- Thomas Whitham (1888–1924), English recipient of the Victoria Cross
- Vic Whitham (1894–1962), English footballer

== See also ==
- Whittam, people with this surname
