= Georges Stern =

French jockey

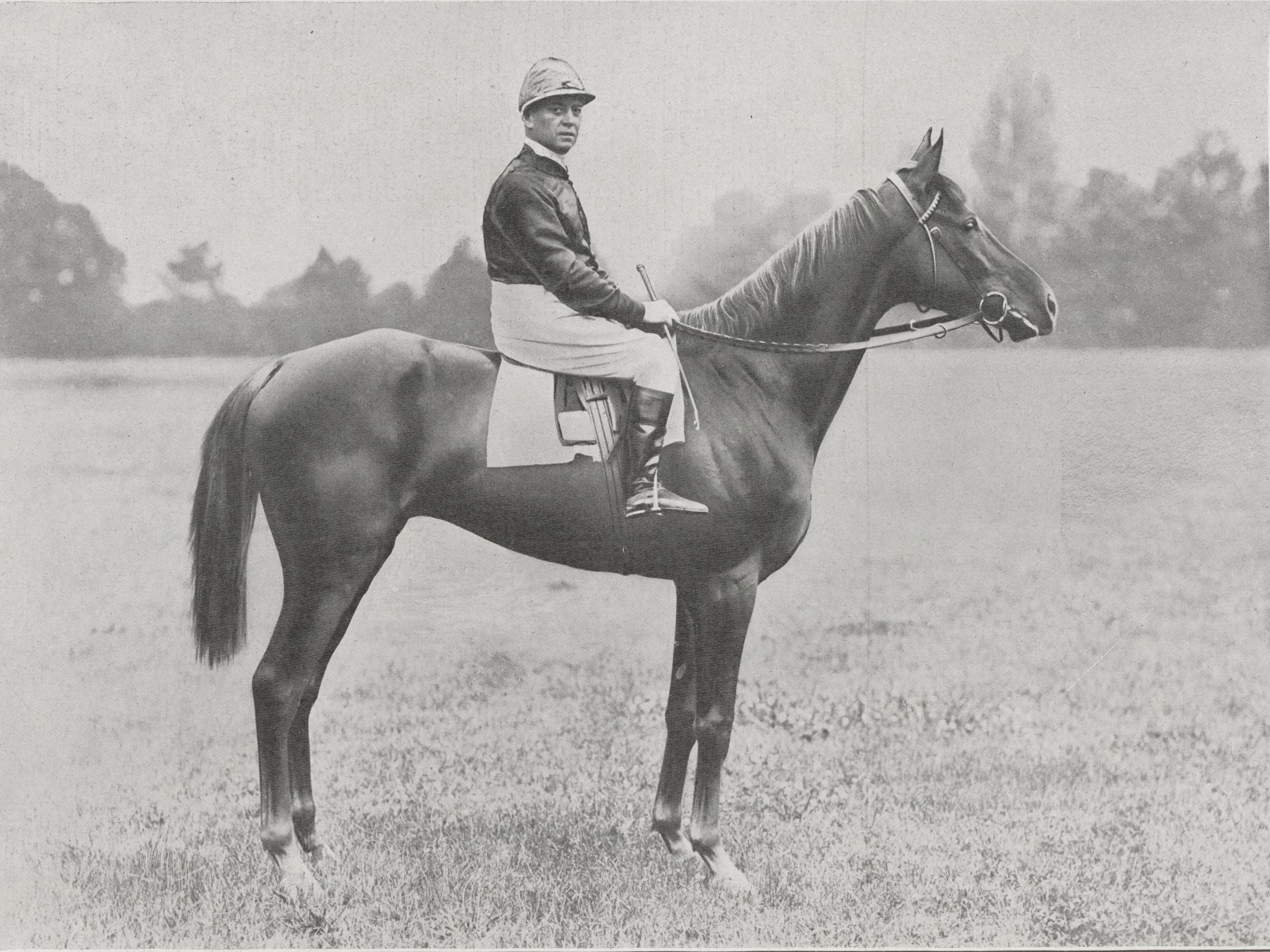

Personal information
- Born: 1882 France
- Died: 28 October 1928 (aged 45–46) France
- Occupation: Jockey

Horse racing career
- Sport: Horse racing

Georges Stern (29 Sep 1883 – October 28, 1928), nicknamed "The King of the Derbies"and "King of the Jockeys", was France's most famous jockey in the early part of the 20th century. Besides France, he also rode in England.

Stern was born in Chantilly, France to British parents, George and Margaret Stearn who were naturalized in France. Although later said to be Jewish, his father and mother came from Christian families, his cousin Alfred Stearn was a Vicar of Swaffham Bulbeck. His maternal grandparents were James Watkin, horse trainer and Anna Maria Flatman, niece of Nat Flatman.

In 1904, he won the Grand Prix, the French Derby (riding Ajax), the French Oaks (Profane), the Austrian Derby (Con Amore), the German Derby (Con Amore), and the Baden Baden Prix (Caius).

In 1908 he won the French Derby, the Austrian Derby, and the German Derby, and finished second in the Belgian Derby.

In 1898, at 17 years of age, in Colombes Stern won his first race riding Finlas, a horse owned and trained by his father. In 1900, he won the debut Grand Prix de Deauville, riding Amedee. He won the Deauville again in 1901 (riding Jacobite), 1902 (Maximum), and 1909 (Biniou).

He won the 1911 Epsom Derby (riding Sunstar). He was a six-time winner of the Prix du Jockey Club’s French Derby—in 1901 (Saxon), 1904 (Ajax), 1908 (Quintette), 1913 (Dagor), 1914 (Sardanapale), and 1922 (Ramus). He won the Grand Prix de Paris in 1904 (Ajax), 1913 (Bruleur), 1914 (Sardanapale), and 1922 (Ramus).

He retired in 1926. In his career, he had over 1,000 victories. He died at the age of 45, in October 1928 in France.

In 1993, he was elected a member of the International Jewish Sports Hall of Fame.
