= Robert Lowes =

Robert Lowes may refer to:

- Robert Lowes (footballer) (1902–1985), English footballer
- Robert Lowes (weightlifter) (1904–1968), British weightlifter
- Bob Lowes (born 1963), Canadian ice hockey executive and coach

== See also ==
- Robert Lowe (disambiguation)
