= Béla Komjádi =

Hungarian water polo player and coach

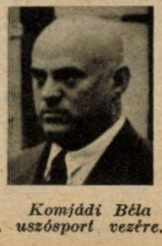

Personal information
- Born: March 15, 1892 Budapest, Hungary
- Died: March 5, 1933 (aged 40)

Sport
- Sport: Water polo

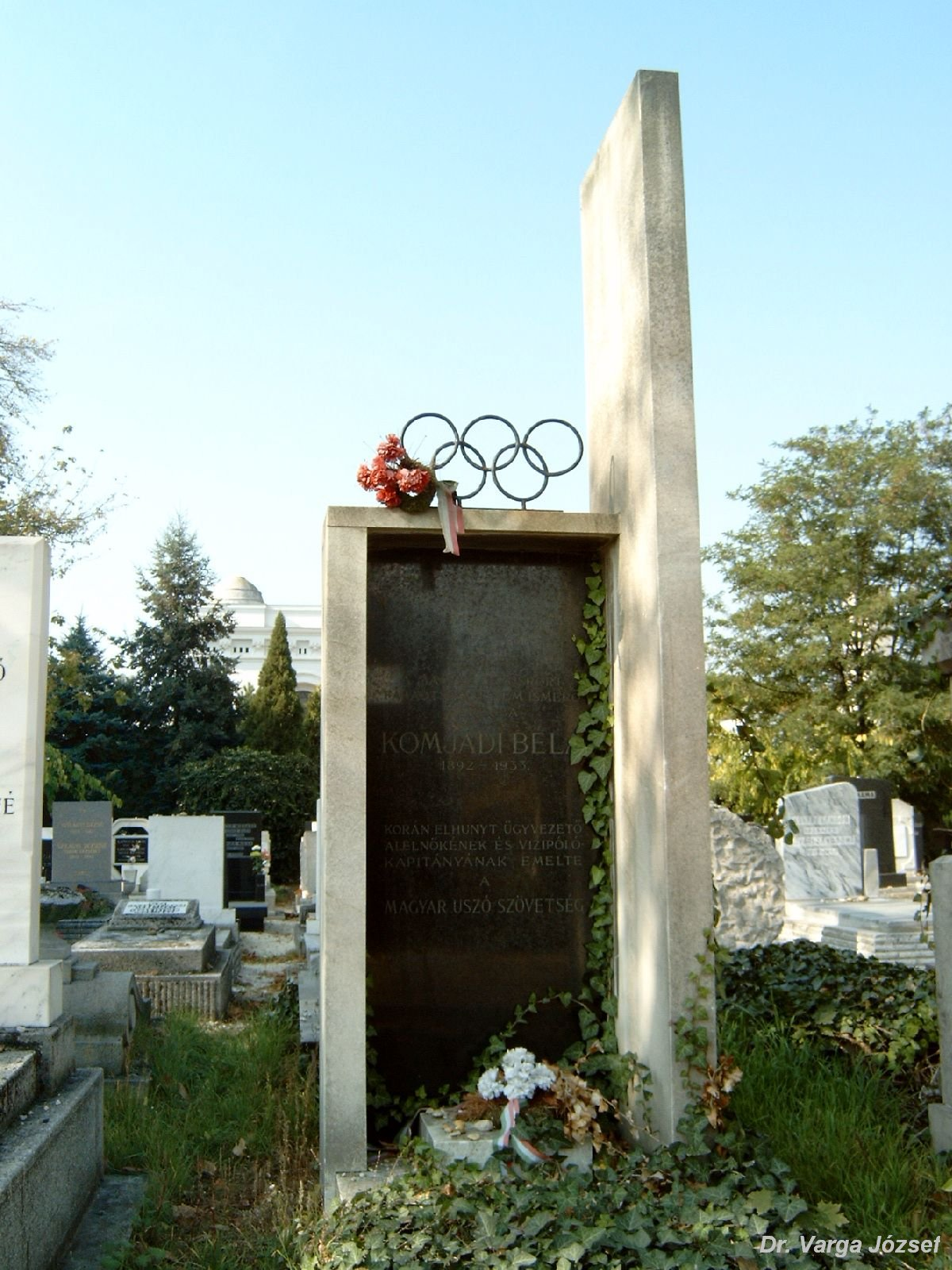
Grave of Béla Komjádi at Jewish Kozma Street Cemetery in Budapest

Béla Komjádi (15 March 1892 – 5 March 1933; known as Béla Bácsi (Uncle Béla) by his players) was a Hungarian water polo player and coach.

== Early life ==
He was Jewish, and was born in Budapest, Hungary.

== Water polo coaching career ==
He helped Hungary form the men's national water polo team, including the non-medaling Olympic teams of 1912 and 1924, and the European Championship teams of 1926, 1927, and 1931, all of which won gold medals.

He died in 1933, while playing water polo, at the age of 41.

In 1976, a new Olympic swimming pool on the Buda bank in Budapest was named the Bela Komjadi Pool, after him.

== Halls of Fame ==
He was inducted into the International Swimming Hall of Fame, and the International Jewish Sports Hall of Fame.

== See also ==
- List of members of the International Swimming Hall of Fame
