= Braes (disambiguation) =

Braes is another name for a hill.

Braes may also refer to:

- The Braes, historic mansion on the gold coast of Long Island
- Battle of the Braes, an 1882 local battle in Scotland
- Upper Braes (ward), electoral ward in Falkirk, Scotland
- Lower Braes (ward), electoral ward in Falkirk, Scotland

== See also ==
- Brae (disambiguation)
