= Robert Low =

Robert Low may refer to:

- Robert Low (writer) (1949–2021), Scottish journalist and writer of historical fiction
- Robert Low (Indian Army officer) (1838–1911), British officer in the British Indian Army
- Robert Cranston Low (1879–1949), Scottish physician and dermatologist

== See also ==
- Robert Lowe (disambiguation)
- Robert Loe (born 1991), New Zealand basketball player
