= Lydia Lazarov =

Israeli former yachting world champion (born 1946)

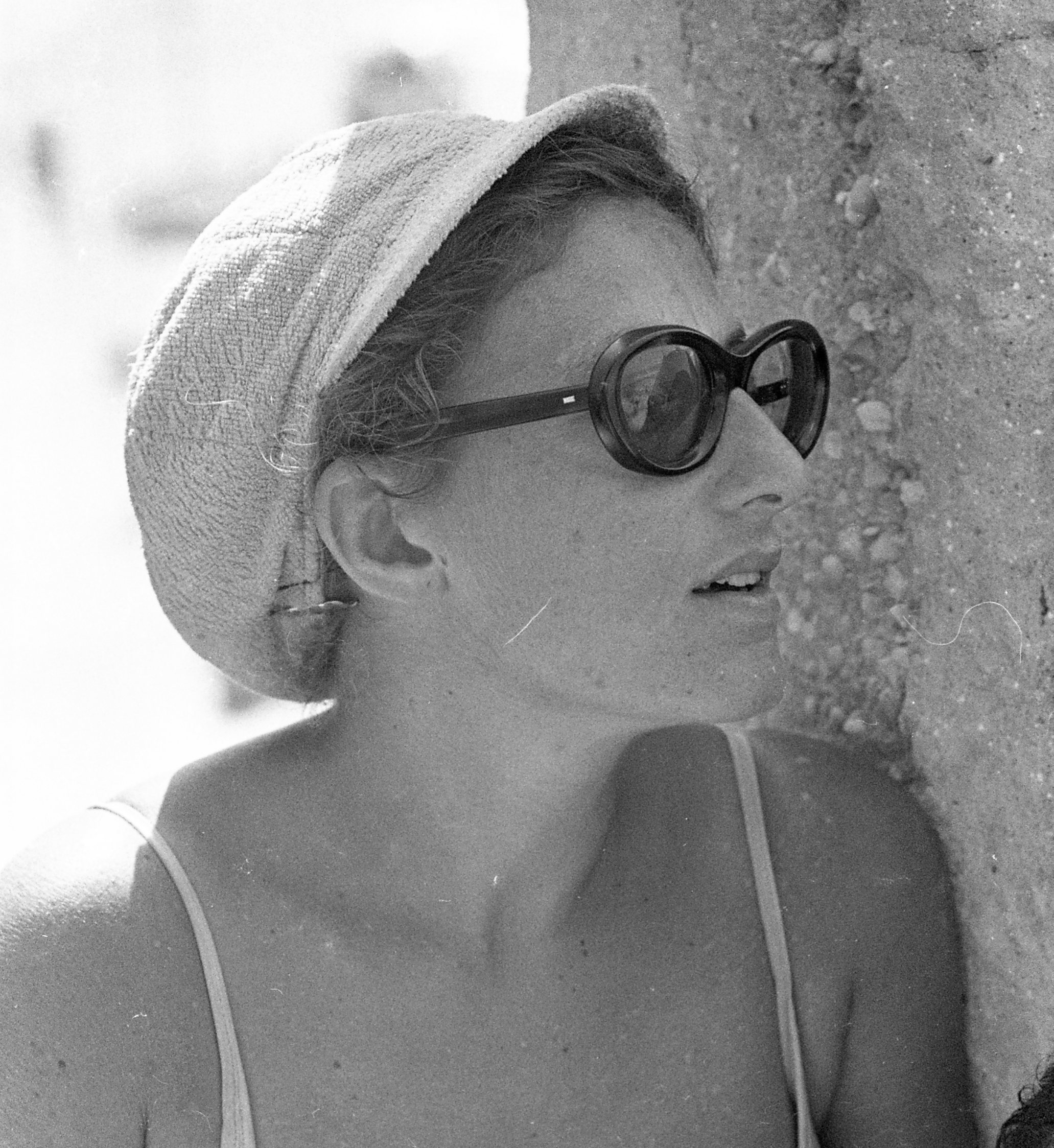
- Lazarov in 1969

Personal information
- Native name: לידיה לזרוב
- Nationality: Israeli
- Born: 16 January 1946 (age 80) Sofia, Bulgaria

Sport
- Sport: Sailing
- Event: 420
- Club: Zvulun Sailing Club, Bat Yam, Israel
- Retired: Yes

Achievements and titles
- World finals: (gold) (1969, 1970)
Medal record
420 class
Representing Israel
420 World Championships
Gold medal – first place	1969 Sandhem	Team 420
Gold medal – first place	1970 Tel Aviv	Singles 420

Lydia Lazarov (Hebrew: לידיה לזרוב; born 16 January 1946) is an Israeli former sailing world champion.

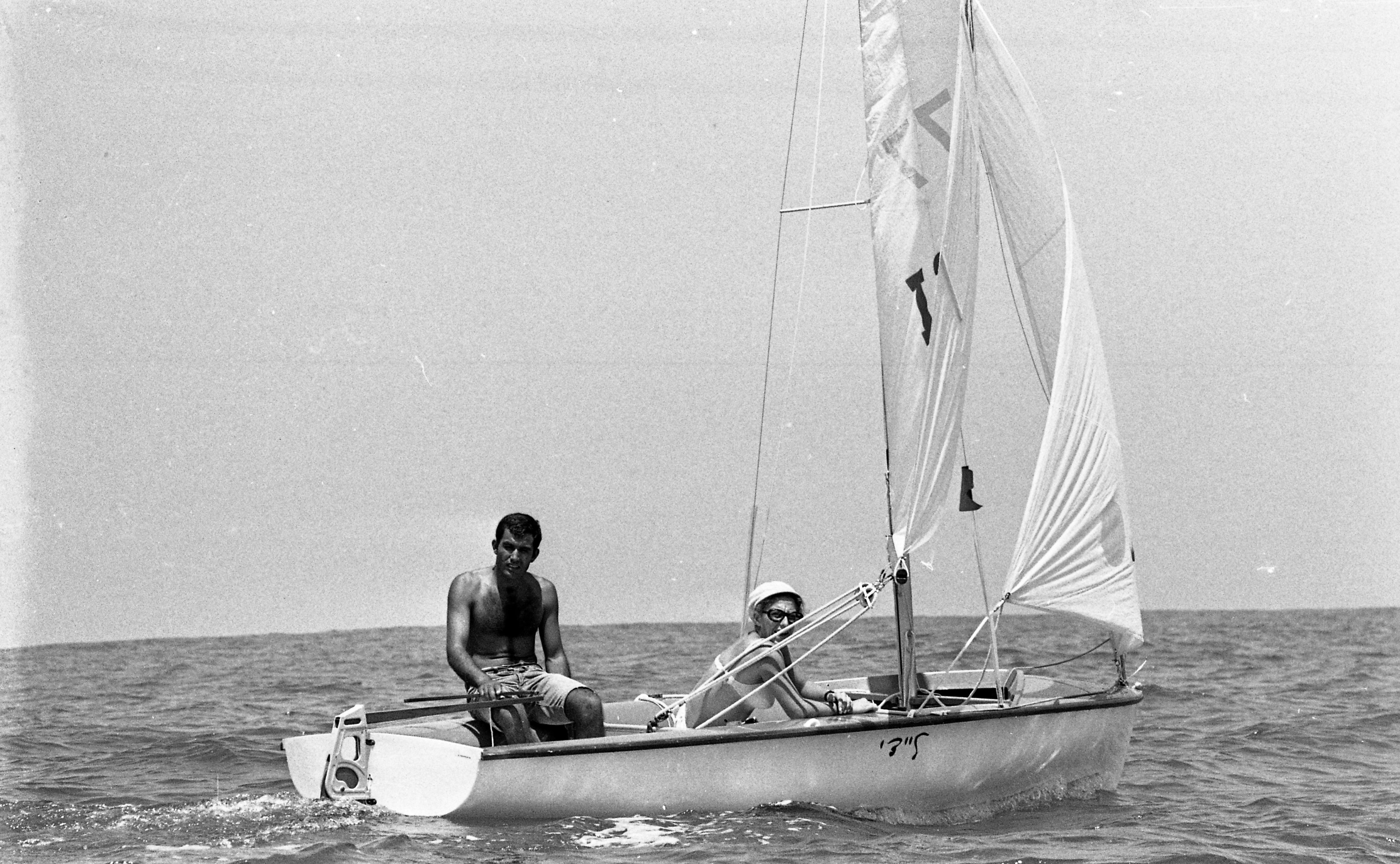
Lydia Lazarov and Zefania Carmel in 1969.

== Biography ==
Lazarov is Jewish, and was born in Sofia, Bulgaria.

== Sailing career ==
Lazarov and Zefania Carmel were teammates in the Zevulun Sailing Club in Bat Yam, Israel. They won the 1966 Israeli 420-class national championship.

Lazarov and Carmel also won the 1969 world title in the Team 420 Sailing Class, at Sandhamn, Sweden, where other 64 boats from 16 countries competed. They were the first world champions in any sport representing Israel. Next year, at the World Championships held in Tel Aviv in 1970, Lazarov won the title of world champion in singles in the 420 class, and finished in doubles (along with Zefania Carmel) in fifth place.

Lazarov was inducted into the International Jewish Sports Hall of Fame in 1992.

== See also ==
- Sports in Israel
- List of select Jews in sailing
