= Zefania Carmel =

Israeli yacht racer

Zefania Carmel (Hebrew: צפניה כרמל; born December 21, 1940, in Baghdad, Iraq; died September 22, 1980) was an Israeli yachting world champion.

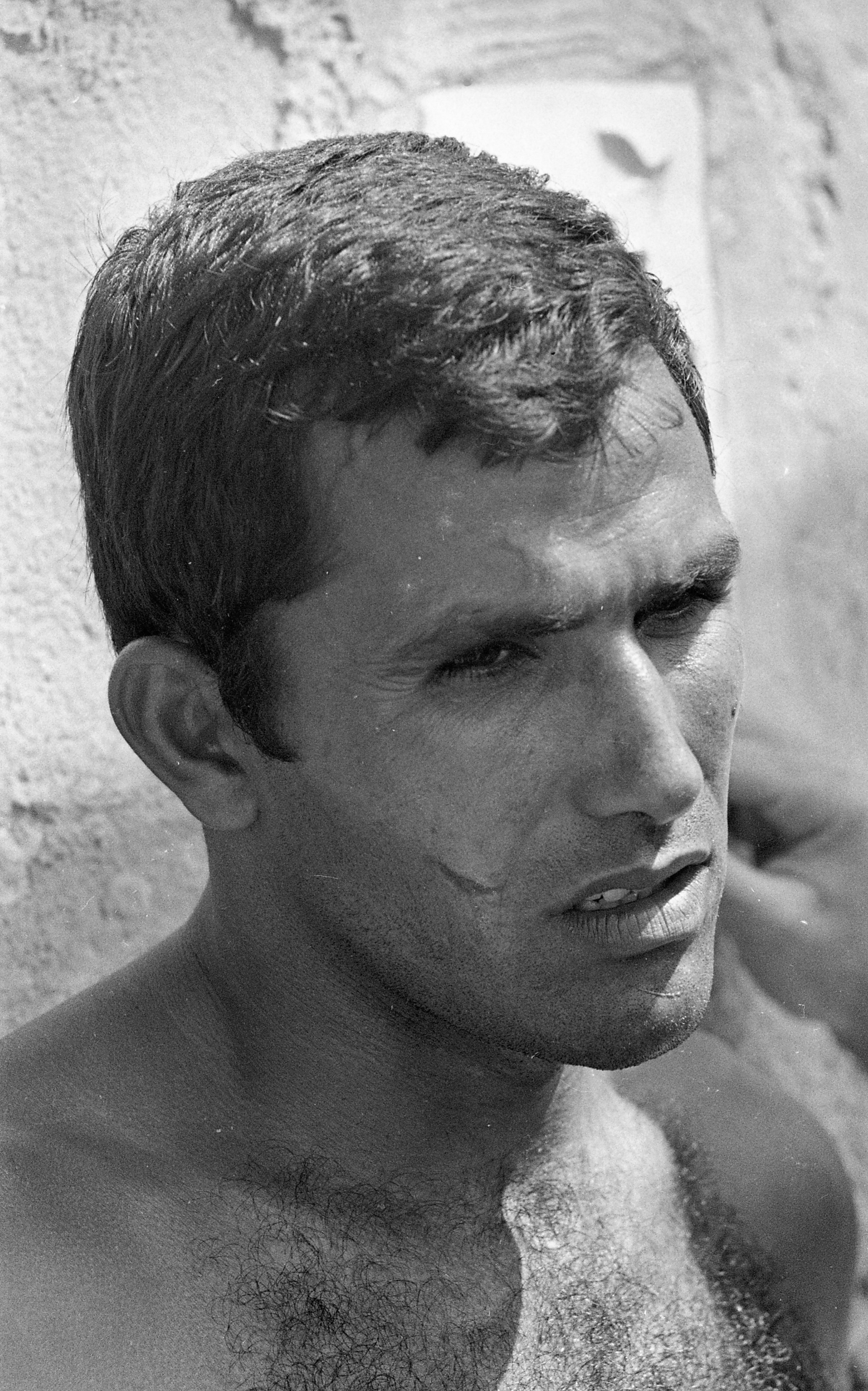
Zefania Carmel

== Yachting career ==
Carmel partnered with Lydia Lazarov to win the Israeli yachting championship in 1966 in the 420-Class. They won the world championships in the Team 420 Non-Olympic Sailing Class in 1969. Carmel won the individual Israeli yachting championship in 1970.

== Death ==
Carmel drowned during training in September 1980.

== Hall of Fame ==
Carmel was inducted into the International Jewish Sports Hall of Fame in 1982.

== See also ==
- List of select Jews in sailing
