= Yehoshua Alouf =

Israeli writer (1900–1980)

- יהושע אלוף
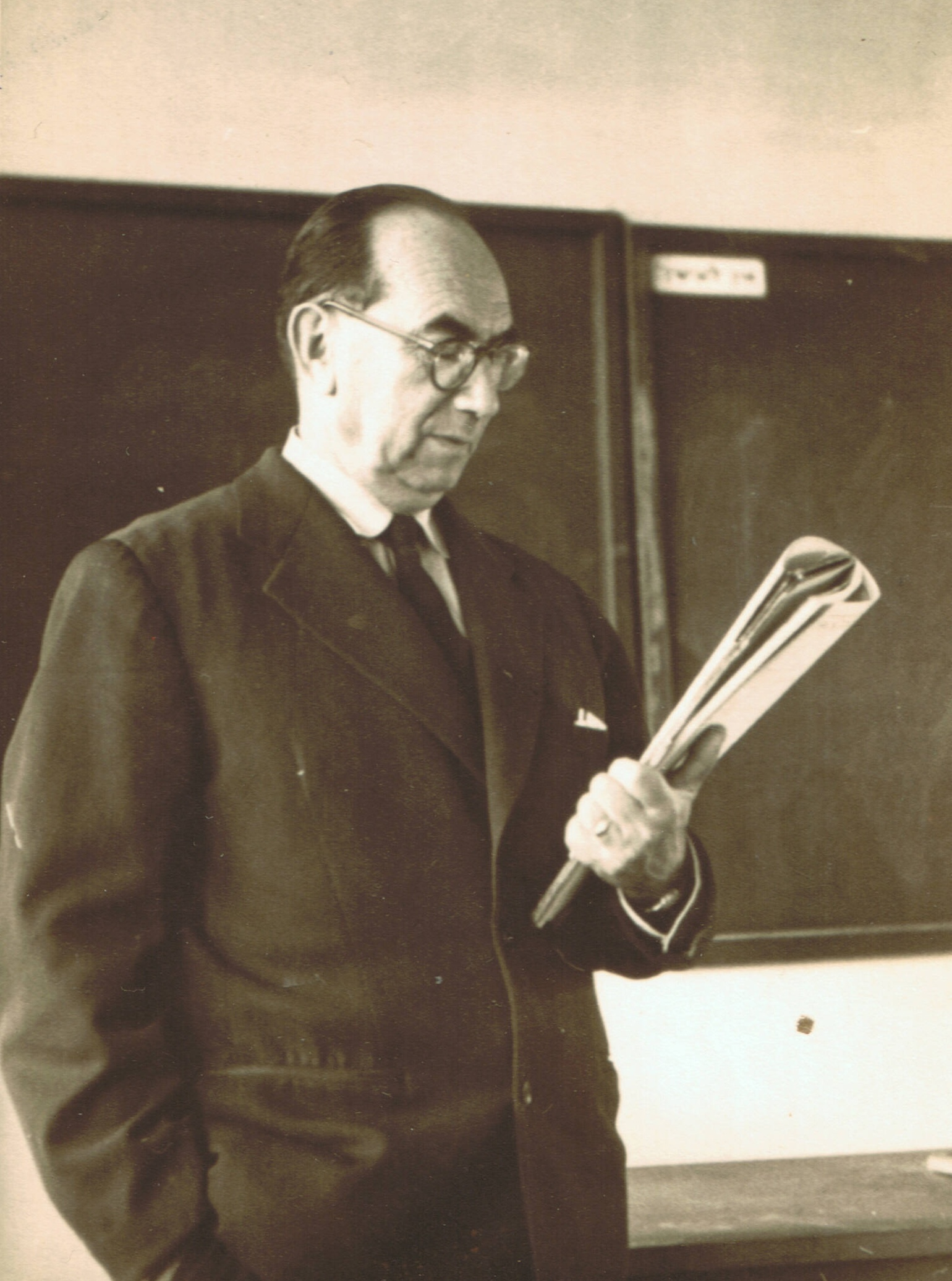
- Born: Yehoshua Alouf; March 4, 1900; Slonim, Belorussia
- Died: July 26, 1980 (aged 80); Tel Aviv, Israel
- Occupation: Writer
- Known for: Leader of the Maccabi Organization and Maccabiah Games, Winner of the Israel Prize

Yehoshua Alouf (Volpianski; March 4, 1900 – July 26, 1980) was one of the founders of sports in Israel and the leaders of the Maccabi organization and the Maccabiah Games. He was the recipient of the Israel Prize in 1974.

== Biography ==
Alouf was born in the town of Slonim, Belarus. In 1912 he was sent to Israel and began studying at the "Herzliya" Hebrew Gymnasium. In 1914 he returned to visit his parents. Due to the outbreak of WWI he remained in Europe and continued his studies at the Reali School in Warsaw.

In 1924 he married Hilda Ne'eman, the daughter of Abba Ne'eman, an industrialist and one of the founders of Tel Aviv. They had one son.

He died in 1980 and is buried in the Kiryat Shaul Cemetery.

== Career ==
From 1922 he was a physical education teacher at the Herzliya Gymnasium and at the Hebrew Teachers' Seminary in Jerusalem. In 1925, he was sent to Denmark for professional training at Physical Education Institute and then was appointed Chief Instructor for Maccabi Tel Aviv, and subsequently for Maccabi Jerusalem.

He organized the first Maccabiah games held in 1932, 1935, 1950, and 1953. (World War II delayed the games which were to be held in 1938 and they only began again in 1950). From 1938 he held the position of physical education supervisor for the school system and From 1954 he was director of the Israel department of physical education from 1953 to 1957.

He was a member of the Board of Trustees of the Wingate Institute and in 1951 received the Dov Hoz award for Sports from the municipality of Tel Aviv for his book (in Hebrew) Gymnastics Terminology.Alouf received the Israel Prize in 1974 for his special contribution to society and the state in the field of physical culture. He was awarded the Pillar of Achievement Award of the International Jewish Sports Hall of Fame for Administration in 1981.

== Awards ==
- Dov Hoz award for Sports ( 1951)
- Israel Prize (1974)
- Pillar of Achievement Award (1981)
- Yakir Maccabi Award (1991)
