= Edgar Whittaker =

English footballer

Personal information
- Position: Goalkeeper

Senior career*
Years	Team	Apps	(Gls)
1902–1903	Burnley	1	(0)
- * Club domestic league appearances and goals

Edgar Whittaker was an English professional footballer who played as a goalkeeper. He made one appearance for Burnley in the Football League Second Division.
