= Ernest Hackett =

English footballer

Personal information
- Date of birth: 1908
- Place of birth: Royston, England
- Position: Goalkeeper

Senior career*
Years	Team	Apps	(Gls)
- Monckton Athletic
- Frickley Colliery
1930	Wolverhampton Wanderers	0	(0)
1931	Coventry City	4	(0)
1932	Newport County	4	(0)
- Frickley Colliery
- * Club domestic league appearances and goals

Ernest Hackett (born 1908, date of death unknown) was a footballer who played in the Football League for Coventry City and Newport County. He was born in Royston, England. Ernest transferred to Wolverhampton Wanderers aged 23 on 11 October 1930 after transferring to Frickley Colliery from Monckton Athletic two seasons previously. He was described as 5 ft 8 1/2 ins weighing 11st 7 lb. (British Newspaper Archives)
