= Darren Quinton =

English footballer

Personal information
- Date of birth: 28 April 1986 (age 40)
- Place of birth: Romford, England
- Height: 5 ft 8 in (1.73 m)
- Position: Midfielder

Youth career
- Ipswich Town
- Cambridge United

Senior career*
Years	Team	Apps	(Gls)
2003–2009	Cambridge United	68	(1)
2003	→ Welling United (loan)	2	(0)
2009–20??	Braintree Town		
- St Albans City
- * Club domestic league appearances and goals as of 09:39, 5 April 2009 (UTC)

Darren Quinton (born 28 April 1986) was an English footballer who played as a midfielder for St Albans City.

== Career ==
He joined Cambridge United's youth scheme at the age of 16, after leaving Ipswich Town's youth academy.

As a youth scholar in September 2003, he was loaned to Welling United where he made two appearances. He made his Cambridge United debut on 8 May 2004, the final match of the League Two season against Leyton Orient. He joined Braintree Town in March 2009, the club where his cousin Brad Quinton was captain.

He now works full-time in London and has moved to a home in Essex.
