= Billy Brae =

Scottish footballer

Personal information
- Full name: William Brae
- Date of birth: 4 November 1902
- Place of birth: Glasgow, Scotland
- Date of death: 22 April 1968 (aged 65)
- Place of death: Cheltenham, England
- Position: Inside left

Senior career*
Years	Team	Apps	(Gls)
–	Petershill		
1923–1935	Ayr United	326	(101)
1935–1936	Swindon Town	6	(1)
1936–1937	Cheltenham Town		
1937–1938	Evesham Town		
Total		332	(102)
- * Club domestic league appearances and goals

William Brae (4 November 1902 – 22 April 1968) was a Scottish footballer who played mainly as an inside left; he spent the majority of his career with Ayr United, making 350 appearances in the Scottish Football League and Scottish Cup over 12 seasons and scoring 104 goals. His best league return was 20 goals from 31 matches in the 1927–28 Scottish Division Two season in which Ayr finished top to gain promotion to Division One, and they remained in the highest tier for the rest of Brae's time at the club. In 1935 he moved on to English football with Swindon Town, subsequently playing in the lower leagues with Cheltenham Town and Evesham Town.
