= British Antarctic Expedition =

British Antarctic Expedition may refer to:

- British Antarctic Expedition 1898–1900, also known as the Southern Cross Expedition
- British Antarctic Expedition, 1901–04, also known as the Discovery Expedition
- British Antarctic Expedition, 1907–09, also known as the Nimrod Expedition
- British Antarctic Expedition, 1910–13, also known as the Terra Nova Expedition
