= Shai Efrati =

Israeli physician (born 1971)

- שי אפרתי
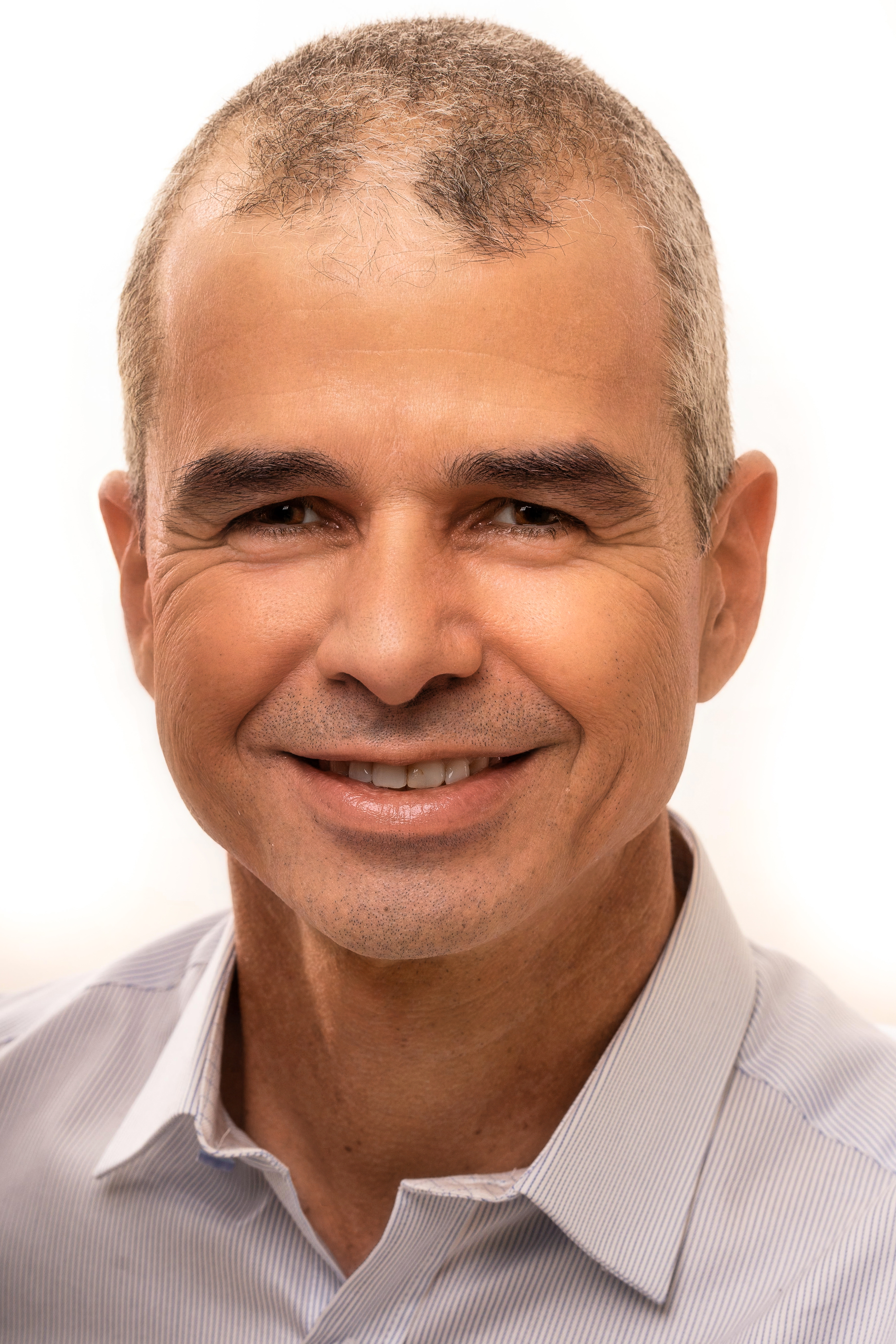
- Portrait of Dr. Shai Efrati
- Born: 1971 (age 54–55)
- Citizenship: Israeli
- Education: Ben-Gurion University of the Negev
- Scientific career
- Fields: Hyperbaric Medicine, Enhanced Medicine
- Workplaces: Tel Aviv University, Yitzhak Shamir Medical Center, Sagol Center for Hyperbaric Medicine and Research

Shai Efrati (Hebrew: שי אפרתי; born 1971) is a physician from Israel and an associate professor at the Sackler Faculty of Medicine and the Sagol School of Neuroscience at Tel Aviv University as well as director of the Sagol Center for Hyperbaric Medicine and Research at the Yitzhak Shamir Medical Center in Israel. As of 2008, Efrati has served as chairman of the Israeli Society for Diving and Hyperbaric Medicine. Efrati is also Co-Founder and Chair of Medical Advisory Board for Aviv Scientific.

== Education and career ==
Efrati completed his M.D. at Ben Gurion University between 1994 and 2000. He later completed his residency, specializing in internal medicine, between 2001 and 2004, with the Department of Internal Medicine of Yitzhak Shamir Medical Center. In 2003, he continued his diving and hyperbaric medicine training at the Israel Naval Institute in Haifa. He specialized in nephrology. From 2005 to 2007, he was the head of the Nephrology Division and the Head of the Research and Development unit at Yitzhak Shamir Medical Center since 2015.

Efrati is co-founder and Scientific Director of Hospitech Respiration Ltd., founded in 2006 and based in Israel. The company engages in the development of respiratory tract management devices for mechanically ventilated patients. It is based on the AnapnoGuard system, a continuous closed-loop control system that prevents complications related to prolonged mechanical ventilation by continuously monitoring CO_{2} levels above the cuff and adjusting cuff pressure required to maintain the seal at the appropriate pressure.

Efrati is co-founder and chair of the Medical Advisory Board of Aviv Scientific, which leverages Efrati's research on HBOT to improve brain and physical performance in healthy aging adults.

Efrati is a founding member of the Global Aging Consortium initiated by Aviv Scientific, which includes internationally recognized researchers to advance innovations in healthy aging: Dr. Michael Roizen, Dr. Nir Barzilai, Dr. Eric Verdin, Dr. Joseph Maroon.

In 2024, Efrati published the book Beyond Normal (ISBN 979-8-89138-150-6). In it, Efrati details his experiences delivering enhanced medicine, a term he uses for initiating physiological changes that lead to improved function and enhanced physical and cognitive capacity.

== Research work ==
In 2008, Efrati founded and now directs the Sagol Center for Hyperbaric Medicine and Research at Tel Aviv University and Yitzhak Shamir Medical Center, where he oversees and collaborates with other scientists and manages a sizeable hyperbaric medicine and research facility. The center currently treats up to 200 patients per day.

Efrati has initiated a research program focusing on neuroplasticity and cognitive rehabilitation by the use of Hyperbaric Oxygen Therapy (HBOT). In his clinical studies, it was proved that HBOT can induce neuroplasticity and improves neurocognitive functions in post stroke and Traumatic Brain Injury (TBI) years after the acute Insult. The clinical results gained from the research program have led to ongoing cooperation between a multidisciplinary team focused on the regenerative effects of hyperbaric oxygen in various brain injuries such as stroke, post-concussion syndrome (PCS), Traumatic Brain Injury, Long Covid, severe emotional trauma, PTSD, Alzheimer's disease as well with a special focus on age-related functional decline.

In his studies, it was demonstrated that HBOT can induce neuroplasticity and significant clinical improvement in patients with fibromyalgia who have a history of childhood sexual abuse.

In his recent study, HBOT was shown to induce cognitive enhancements in healthy aging adults via mechanisms involving regional changes in Cerebral blood flow. The main improvements include attention, information processing speed and executive functions, which generally decline with aging.

In his Aging study, on November 18, 2020, for the first time in humans, two key biological hallmarks of aging, telomere length shortening and accumulation of senescent cells, were shown to be reversed with Hyperbaric Oxygen Therapy (HBOT).

Since December 2021, he started one of the most comprehensive studies on post-COVID patients.The findings revealed that patients treated with HBOT experienced significant improvements in their overall cognitive function and within specific brain regions responsible for attention and executive function. They also showed enhancements in energy levels, sleep patterns, psychiatric symptoms, and pain management. The positive effects of this unique treatment protocol are attributed to neuroplasticity and increased brain perfusion in areas related to cognitive and emotional functions.

The second study employed a novel functional MRI technique and identified significant changes in brain connectivity and functional networks in the HBOT group compared to the placebo group. Furthermore, a third study in 2023 demonstrated that HBOT could improve cardiac functions in post-COVID patients as well.

== Selected papers ==
- Shapira R, Gdalyahu A, Gottfried I, Sasson E, Hadanny A, Efrati S, Blinder P, Ashery U (September 2021). "Hyperbaric oxygen therapy alleviates vascular dysfunction and amyloid burden in an Alzheimer's disease mouse model and in elderly patients". Aging. 13 (17): 20935–20961. doi:10.18632/aging.203485. PMC 8457592. PMID 34499614.
- Hachmo Y, Hadanny A, Abu-Hamed R, Daniel-Kotovsky M, Catalogna M, Fishlev G, Lang E, Polak N, Doenyas K, Friedman M, Zemel Y, Bechor Y, Efrati S (November 2020). "Hyperbaric oxygen therapy increases telomere length and decreases immunosenescence in isolated blood cells: a prospective trial". Aging. 12 (22): 22445–22456. doi:10.18632/aging.202188. PMC 7746357. PMID 33206062.
- Tal S, Hadanny A, Sasson E, Suzin G, Efrati S (2017). "Hyperbaric Oxygen Therapy Can Induce Angiogenesis and Regeneration of Nerve Fibers in Traumatic Brain Injury Patients". Frontiers in Human Neuroscience. 11: 508. doi:10.3389/fnhum.2017.00508. PMC 5654341. PMID 29097988.
- Vadas D, Kalichman L, Hadanny A, Efrati S (2017). "Hyperbaric Oxygen Environment Can Enhance Brain Activity and Multitasking Performance". Frontiers in Integrative Neuroscience. 11: 25. doi:10.3389/fnint.2017.00025. PMC 5623811. PMID 29021747.
- Tal S, Hadanny A, Berkovitz N, Sasson E, Ben-Jacob E, Efrati S (2015). "Hyperbaric oxygen may induce angiogenesis in patients suffering from prolonged post-concussion syndrome due to traumatic brain injury". Restorative Neurology and Neuroscience. 33 (6): 943–51. doi:10.3233/RNN-150585. PMID 26484702.
- Efrati S, Golan H, Bechor Y, Faran Y, Daphna-Tekoah S, Sekler G, Fishlev G, Ablin JN, Bergan J, Volkov O, Friedman M, Ben-Jacob E, Buskila D (2015). "Hyperbaric oxygen therapy can diminish fibromyalgia syndrome--prospective clinical trial". PLOS ONE. 10 (5) e0127012. Bibcode:2015PLoSO..1027012E. doi:10.1371/journal.pone.0127012. PMC 4444341. PMID 26010952.
- Boussi-Gross R, Golan H, Volkov O, Bechor Y, Hoofien D, Beeri MS, Ben-Jacob E, Efrati S (July 2015). "Improvement of memory impairments in poststroke patients by hyperbaric oxygen therapy". Neuropsychology. 29 (4): 610–21. doi:10.1037/neu0000149. PMID 25384125.
- Efrati S, Ben-Jacob E (March 2014). "Reflections on the neurotherapeutic effects of hyperbaric oxygen". Expert Review of Neurotherapeutics. 14 (3): 233–6. doi:10.1586/14737175.2014.884928. PMID 24471697. S2CID 13893319.
- Efrati S, Ben-Jacob E (2014). "How and why hyperbaric oxygen therapy can bring new hope for children suffering from cerebral palsy--an editorial perspective". Undersea & Hyperbaric Medicine. 41 (2): 71–6. PMID 24851543.
- Efrati S, Fishlev G, Bechor Y, Volkov O, Bergan J, Kliakhandler K, Kamiager I, Gal N, Friedman M, Ben-Jacob E, Golan H (2013). "Hyperbaric oxygen induces late neuroplasticity in post stroke patients--randomized, prospective trial". PLOS ONE. 8 (1) e53716. Bibcode:2013PLoSO...853716E. doi:10.1371/journal.pone.0053716. PMC 3546039. PMID 23335971.
- Boussi-Gross R, Golan H, Fishlev G, Bechor Y, Volkov O, Bergan J, Friedman M, Hoofien D, Shlamkovitch N, Ben-Jacob E, and Efrati S (2013). "Hyperbaric Oxygen Therapy Can Improve Post Concussion Syndrome Years after Mild Traumatic Brain Injury - Randomized Prospective Trial". PLOS ONE. 8 (11) e79995. Bibcode:2013PLoSO...879995B. doi:10.1371/journal.pone.0079995. PMC 3829860. PMID 24260334.
- Hadanny A, Abbott S, Suzin G, Bechor Y, and Efrati S (2018). "Effect of Hyperbaric Oxygen Therapy on Chronic Neurocognitive Deficits of Post-Traumatic Brain Injury Patients: Retrospective Analysis". BMJ Open. 8 (9) e023387. doi:10.1136/bmjopen-2018-023387. PMC 6169752. PMID 30269074.
- Hadanny A, Bechor Y, Catalogna M, Daphna-Tekoah S, Sigal T, Cohenpour M, Lev-Wiesel R, and Efrati S (2018). "Hyperbaric Oxygen Therapy Can Induce Neuroplasticity and Significant Clinical Improvement in Patients Suffering from Fibromyalgia with a History of Childhood Sexual Abuse-Randomized Controlled Trial". Front Psychol. 9: 2495. doi:10.3389/fpsyg.2018.02495. PMC 6304433. PMID 30618929.
- Shapira R, Solomon B, Efrati S, Frenkel D, and Ashery U (2018). "Hyperbaric Oxygen Therapy Ameliorates Pathophysiology of 3xtg-Ad Mouse Model by Attenuating Neuroinflammation". Neurobiol Aging. 62: 105–19. doi:10.1016/j.neurobiolaging.2017.10.007. PMID 29141186. S2CID 22181394.
- Leitman M, Fuchs S, Efrati S, Hadanny A, and Vered Z (2020). "The effect of hyperbaric oxygenation therapy on myocardial function". The International Journal of Cardiovascular Imaging. 36 (5): 833–840. doi:10.1007/s10554-020-01773-0. PMID 31953651. S2CID 210709163.

== See also ==
- Hyperbaric medicine
- Science and technology in Israel
- Health care in Israel
