= Coon Rosen =

American softball player (1908–1997)

Harry "Coon" Rosen

Harry "Coon" Rosen (1908–1997) was an American softball player.

== Early life and career ==
Rosen was born in a Jewish family in 1908 and was raised in Chicago. During the early days, he led the Von Humboldt School team and they won YMCA baseball title. He was married to Anne Rosen. His wife died in 1989.

In 1931, Rosen helped the University of Illinois to win a conference championship.

In 1932, Rosen won the American Softball Association Fast-pitch Championship for the first time. His statistics include, winning more than 3,000 games, hurled 195 perfect games, and pitched 300 no-hitters.

In 1946, Rosen took retirement from the sports.

Rosen also became a member of the National Softball Hall of Fame and Museum and was the first Jewish person to achieve this recognition.

Rosen died in 1997.
