= Alexander Hughes =

English footballer

Personal information
- Date of birth: 2 July 1907
- Place of birth: Hetton-le-Hole, England
- Date of death: August 1977 (aged 70)
- Place of death: Sunderland, England
- Position: Full-back

Senior career*
Years	Team	Apps	(Gls)
19xx–1931	Heart of Midlothian	?	(?)
1931–1933	Burnley	3	(0)
1933–1934	Accrington Stanley	0	(0)
- * Club domestic league appearances and goals

Alexander Hughes (2 July 1907 – August 1977) was an English professional footballer who played as a full-back. Born in Hetton-le-Hole, County Durham, he played in Scotland with Heart of Midlothian before joining Football League Second Division side Burnley in August 1931. Predominantly a reserve player, Hughes made his first-team debut for Burnley on 21 November 1931 in the 0–5 defeat to Leeds United at Turf Moor. He then spent four months out of the team before returning for the games against Bradford City and Bristol City in March 1932. Hughes then played the entire 1932–33 campaign in the reserves before leaving Burnley to sign for Accrington Stanley in August 1933. He spent one season at Peel Park, but failed to make an appearance for Accrington and left the following year.
