= Georgia Shiels =

English rally driver

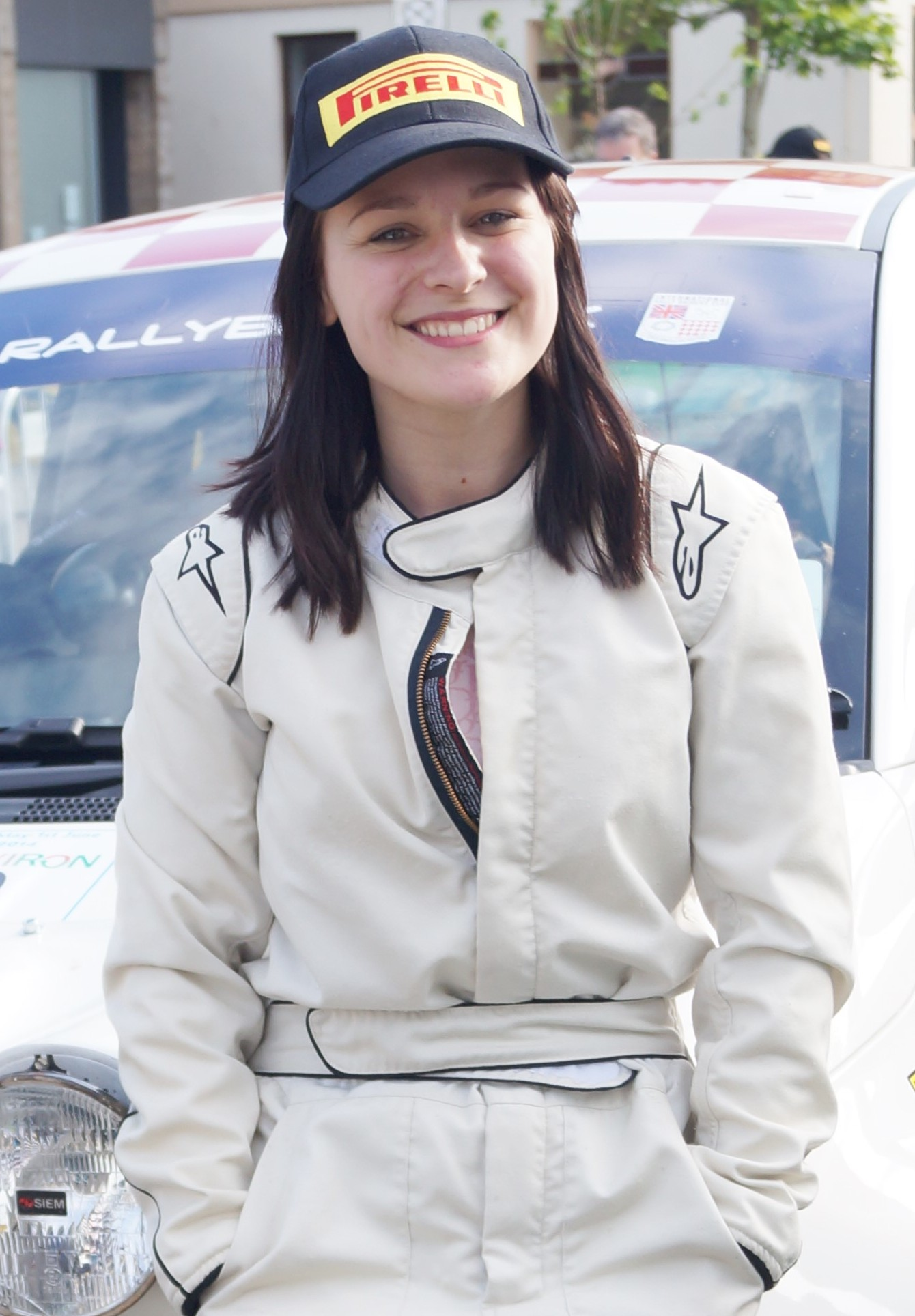

Personal information
- Full name: Georgia Shiels
- Nationality: Great Britain
- Born: 14 January 1996 (age 30) Royal Tunbridge Wells, England
- Home town: Preston, Lancashire
- Height: 1.60 m (5 ft 3 in)
- Website: www.georgiashiels.co.uk

Sport
- Sport: Rallying

Georgia Shiels (born 14 January 1996 in Royal Tunbridge Wells) is an English rally driver. She has won the 2013 Novice Forest Rally Championship, the 2015 Jack Wills Young Brit award and in 2016, Georgia accepted an offer from the University of Bolton to study a degree in Automotive Engineering BEng. Georgia also worked with Abarth as their Abarth 500 Group R R1 development driver in the British Rally Championship 2014 and various other events.

== Career ==
Georgia began rallying at the age of sixteen after a chance meeting with the Junior 1000 Ecosse Challenge coordinator at Knockhill Racing Circuit Motor Show 2011. She took part in the Junior 1000 championship in a 1000cc Nissan Micra, finishing eighth overall. Georgia's best result was sixth overall on the Solway Coast Rally, just seconds off fourth place. By her fourth rally, Georgia had been selected to join the Motor Sports Association Academy AASE course which equips the UK's most promising young drivers with the knowledge, skills and attitude needed to maximise their performance.

In 2013, Shiels turned seventeen and gained her road licence. She competed in her first forest rally a few months later in a 2000cc M-Sport Ford Fiesta ST and finished fourth in the competitive class N3 and first lady driver overall. Georgia was the youngest driver in her class. Georgia selected various forest rallies to compete in. Her best result was second in class N3 and fiftieth overall on Trackrod Rally Yorkshire. Georgia won ANWCC Novice Forest Rally Champion 2013.

In 2014, at age eighteen, Georgia became a development driver for Abarth, driving the Abarth 500 Group R R1 car in numerous asphalt events. Georgia was nominated for Downforce UK's Teen Racing Driver of the Year after showcasing her talent across the year.

In 2015, Georgia became a Scouting ambassador for 4th Blackpool Scouts and began testing her M-Sport Ford Fiesta Group R R2. Georgia won the Jack Wills Young Brit award in the endurance category out of thousands of young British talent.

Georgia is also a STEM First ambassador, encouraging young girls into engineering and motorsport.

Shiels is currently competing in the British Rallycross Championship in 2017 in an RX150 buggy assisted by LOCO Energy Drink.
