= Thomas S. Whittam =

American evolutionary biologist (1954–2008)

Thomas S. Whittam (1954–5 December 2008) was an evolutionary biologist and John Hannah Distinguished Professor at Michigan State University. His research focused on the evolution of bacteria, especially those species that cause food-borne and water-borne illnesses in people and animals.

== Early life and education ==
Whittam was born in Newton, Pennsylvania. He graduated from Franklin and Marshall College in 1976, and he obtained his Ph.D. from the University of Arizona in 1981. From there, Whittam went on to do postdoctoral research with Robert K. Selander at the University of Rochester, where he began his work on the population genetics and evolution of bacteria.

== Career, research, and legacy ==
In 1985, Whittam joined the faculty in the Department of Biology at Penn State University. He was recruited to MSU as the John Hannah Distinguished Professor of Food Safety at Michigan State University in 2000, where he remained until his untimely death.

Whittam is best known for his research on the evolution, diversity, and genetic structure of the bacterial species Escherichia coli, including especially pathogenic strains such as O157:H7. For example, in 2000, he and his team published genetic analyses showing the convergent evolution of virulence factors in pathogenic strains of E. coli, in large part driven by horizontal gene transfer. That and many of his scientific papers have been cited hundreds of times by other workers in the field.

Since his death, the Department of Microbiology, Genetics, and Immunology at MSU has held the Thomas S. Whittam Memorial Lecture in many years, with experts presenting talks on the evolution, ecology, and genetics of pathogenic bacteria. In 2011, Whittam’s expert colleagues and former students published a volume of 18 chapters that commemorates his pioneering research as well as his impact on their lives and work.
