= Brae Bay =

Bay in Nunavut, Canada

- Location within Nunavut
- Location: Jones Sound
- Coordinates: 75°47′N 83°15′W
- Basin countries: Canada
- Settlements: Uninhabited

Brae Bay (previous alternate: Broe Bay) is an Arctic waterway in the Qikiqtaaluk Region, Nunavut, Canada. It is located in Jones Sound by northern Devon Island, just north of the Devon Ice Cap and 12 km (7.5 mi) north of the Sverdrup Glacier (75°40′40″N 83°16′20″W).

The Inuit community of Grise Fiord on Ellesmere Island lies 71 km (44 mi) to the north and the abandoned settlement of Craig Harbour is 77 km (48 mi) to the northeast.
