= Ellis Hargreaves =

English footballer

Personal information
- Place of birth: England
- Position: Inside forward

Senior career*
Years	Team	Apps	(Gls)
1896–1897	Burnley	1	(0)
1897–1898	Tottenham Hotspur	?	(?)
1898–1899	Darwen	14	(1)
- * Club domestic league appearances and goals

Ellis Hargreaves was an English professional association footballer who played as an inside forward. He played in the Football League with Burnley and Darwen.
