= Boletín de la Real Academia Española =

Academic publication

The Boletín de la Real Academia Española (BRAE) is a peer-reviewed, open access academic journal published by the Real Academia Española (RAE). The BRAE publishes one volume per year, containing two issues. The journal contains articles on Hispanic literature and linguistics.

== History ==
The magazine was founded in 1914, on the second centenary of the RAE. Its first director was Emilio Cotarelo y Mori, member of the RAE since 1897 and its secretary since 1913. The publication of the journal was interrupted between 1937 and 1944, due to the Spanish Civil War and its aftermath.

Until 1936, the BRAE was published in five annual notebooks. Between 1936 and 2001, it was published quarterly. Since 2001, it has been published semiannually. Around 2012, the journal underwent some changes with the aim of strengthening its status as a scientific journal, including the appointment of an editorial board. Since 2014, the journal is also published online and is open access.
