= Vic Whitham =

English footballer

Personal information
- Full name: Victor Whitham
- Date of birth: 12 February 1894
- Place of birth: Burnley, England
- Date of death: 1962 (aged 67–68)
- Position: Inside forward

Senior career*
Years	Team	Apps	(Gls)
1912–1913	Kimberworth Congregationals		
1914–1918	Rotherham County		
1918–1919	Kimberworth Old Boys		
1919–1920	Barnsley	3	(0)
1920–1921	Norwich City	9	(3)
1921–1923	Scunthorpe & Lindsey United		
1923–1924	Southend United	20	(10)
1924–1925	Boston Town		
1925	Scunthorpe & Lindsey United		
Total		32	(13)
- * Club domestic league appearances and goals

Victor Whitham (12 February 1894 – 1962) was an English footballer who played in the Football League for Barnsley, Norwich City and Southend United.
