= Ken Holliday =

English footballer

Personal information
- Full name: Kenneth Joseph Holliday
- Date of birth: 19 August 1925
- Place of birth: Darwen, England
- Date of death: 1 February 1999 (aged 73)
- Place of death: Nelson, Lancashire, England
- Position: Defender

Senior career*
Years	Team	Apps	(Gls)
- Darwen
1947–1952	Blackburn Rovers	29	(0)
1952–1955	Accrington Stanley	96	(5)
1955–1956	Barrow	5	(0)
1956–1957	Nelson		
Total		130	(5)
- * Club domestic league appearances and goals

Kenneth Joseph Holliday (19 August 1925 – 1 February 1999) was an English professional footballer who played as a defender in the Football League.
