= William Howarth (footballer) =

English footballer

Personal information
- Full name: William Howarth
- Date of birth: 1875
- Place of birth: England
- Position: Inside forward

Senior career*
| Years | Team | Apps | (Gls) |
| | Accrington | ? | (?) |
| 1899–1903 | Burnley | 14 | (0) |
- * Club domestic league appearances and goals

William Howarth (born 1875) was an English professional footballer who predominantly played as an inside forward, but also appeared in various other positions. He started his career with Accrington before joining Football League First Division side Burnley in December 1899. Howarth made his debut for the club in the Second Division match away at Glossop on 22 September 1900. He went on to keep his place for the following four matches, with the team recording victories over Middlesbrough and Chesterfield, before losing his place to James Savage for the game against New Brighton Tower on 27 October 1900.

Howarth played in the Burnley reserves for the remainder of the 1900–01 season, and he was unable to break into the first team at the beginning of the following campaign. He made his first appearance of the season on 18 January 1902 in the 0–0 draw with Woolwich Arsenal at Turf Moor, deputising for Harry Ross in an unfamiliar right-back position. Howarth then played at left-half in the 2–5 defeat to Burton United three games later. He was more involved in first team matches throughout the 1902–03 season, making a total of seven league appearances, including a three-game spell at right-half following the departure of Tommy Morrison to Manchester United. Haworth played his last competitive match for Burnley in the final match of the campaign, a 0–3 defeat away at Stockport County. The team finished bottom of the league in the 1902–03 season and manager Ernest Mangnall subsequently released several players, and Howarth was one of the men to leave the club in April 1903.
