= Withams, Virginia =

Unincorporated community in Virginia, United States

Coordinates: 37°56′44″N 75°34′38″W

Withams is an unincorporated community in Accomack County, Virginia, United States.
