= Michael Leonard Witham =

Michael Leonard Witham is an American singer, songwriter, and musician. He released his debut album - A Scandal In The Violets, independently in October 2014. Witham's music has been described as Americana, Alternative Country, and Folk.

== Career ==
Witham's path to a music career started in 2010 when he found a damaged guitar in a dumpster behind a strip mall in Shreveport, Louisiana. In Shreveport on a gambling excursion, Witham initially intended to try to sell the guitar to a pawn shop. Instead, Witham took the guitar home to Little Rock, Arkansas, and learned to play it by watching online tutorials. From 2012 to early 2014, Witham recorded A Scandal In The Violets in about five, spread out, studio sessions with producer Jason Weinheimer in Little Rock.

Craig Manning of Absolutepunk.com rated A Scandal In The Violets, 7.5 out of 10, calling the album "one of the best Americana albums of the year." Cody Conard of Big Takeover magazine compared Witham's songwriting favorably to John Prine and Bob Dylan and said "unlike the hordes of copycats, Witham really sounds like the real deal. He’s a musician’s musician, and his music has the feeling of the kind of stuff future songwriters will be citing as a key influence, not unlike Dylan or Prine. It’s impossible to tell what the future will hold, of course, but A Scandal in the Violets has all the makings of a classic album, and if not, the stepping stones towards a future masterpiece"

== Discography ==
A Scandal In The Violets (2014)
