= Gus Huxford =

English professional footballer who played as a Winger

Personal information
- Full name: Augustus Thomas Huxford
- Date of birth: 29 July 1889
- Place of birth: Brixham, England
- Date of death: 1961 (aged 71–72)
- Position: Winger

Senior career*
Years	Team	Apps	(Gls)
1909–1910	Grimsby St John's		
1910–1912	Grimsby Town	22	(1)
1912–1913	Goole Town		
1913–1914	Castleford Town		
1914–1920	Grimsby Town	6	(1)
1920–1921	Charlton's		
1921–1922	Worksop Town		
1922–1923	Charlton's		
1923–1924	Brigg Town		
1924–192?	Louth Town		
- * Club domestic league appearances and goals

Augustus Thomas Huxford (29 July 1889 – 1961) was an English professional footballer who played as a winger.
