= Ron Garland =

English footballer

Personal information
- Full name: Ronald Garland
- Date of birth: 28 July 1931
- Place of birth: Middlesbrough, England
- Date of death: 4 April 1989 (aged 57)
- Place of death: Oldham, England
- Position: Centre forward

Senior career*
Years	Team	Apps	(Gls)
- South Bank St Peters
19??–1955	Oldham Athletic	9	(3)
1955–1957	Mossley		
1957–19??	Stalybridge Celtic		
- * Club domestic league appearances and goals

Ronald Garland (28 July 1931 – 4 April 1989) was an English professional footballer who played as a centre forward. He played in the Football League for Oldham Athletic.

Garland played for South Bank St Peters before joining Oldham Athletic. He scored 3 times in 9 games, including a goal in the 3–2 win away to Hartlepool United in September 1955, before leaving to join Mossley. He scored 20 times in 47 games for Mossley, leaving to join Stalybridge Celtic.
