= Richard Riley (footballer) =

English footballer

Personal information
- Place of birth: Padiham, England
- Position: Winger

Senior career*
Years	Team	Apps	(Gls)
- Colne
1912–1913	Burnley	3	(2)
1913–1919	Third Lanark	25	(6)
- * Club domestic league appearances and goals

Richard Riley (active 1910s) was an English professional footballer who played as a winger. He played three matches and scored two goals in the Football League for Burnley before moving to Scotland to join Third Lanark.
