= James Fairburn =

English footballer

Personal information
- Position: Inside forward

Senior career*
Years	Team	Apps	(Gls)
18xx–1899	Darlington	?	(?)
1899–1900	Burnley	1	(0)
- * Club domestic league appearances and goals

James Fairburn was an English professional footballer who played as an inside forward. He started his career with Darlington before joining Football League First Division side Burnley in May 1899. He made his debut for the club on 2 September 1899 in the 0–2 defeat away at Glossop. However, he was replaced by Walter Place for the following match and never played again for the club. Fairburn was subsequently released by Burnley in March 1900.
