= Harry Duckworth =

English footballer

Personal information
- Place of birth: England
- Position: Inside forward

Senior career*
Years	Team	Apps	(Gls)
1902–1903	Burnley	9	(2)
- * Club domestic league appearances and goals

Harry Duckworth was an English professional association footballer who played as an inside forward.
