= Joseph Kenyon =

English footballer

Personal information
- Position: Winger

Senior career*
Years	Team	Apps	(Gls)
- Failsworth
1906–1907	Burnley	29	(0)
- * Club domestic league appearances and goals

Joseph Kenyon was an English professional footballer who played as a winger. After starting his career in non-league football with Failsworth, he played 29 matches in the Football League for Burnley in the 1906–07 season.
