= George Baldry =

English footballer

Personal information
- Full name: George William Baldry
- Date of birth: 26 May 1911
- Place of birth: Cleethorpes, England
- Date of death: October 1987 (aged 76)
- Place of death: Southend-on-Sea, England
- Height: 5 ft 8 in (1.73 m)
- Position: Winger

Senior career*
Years	Team	Apps	(Gls)
1933	Humber United		
1933–1936	Grimsby Town	20	(7)
1936–1937	Hull City	5	(2)
1937–1938	Scunthorpe & Lindsey United		
1938–1939	Chelmsford City		
1939–19??	Shrewsbury Town		
- * Club domestic league appearances and goals

George William Baldry (26 May 1911 – October 1987) was an English professional footballer who played as a winger.
