= Lawson Bennett =

English footballer (1938–2011)

Personal information
- Full name: Lawson Henry Bennett
- Date of birth: 28 August 1938
- Place of birth: Blackburn, England
- Date of death: January 2011 (aged 72)
- Place of death: Blackburn, England
- Position: Right winger

Senior career*
Years	Team	Apps	(Gls)
- Darwen
1958–1961	Accrington Stanley	29	(2)
- Nelson
- * Club domestic league appearances and goals

Lawson Henry Bennett (28 August 1938 – January 2011) was an English professional footballer who played as a right winger in the Football League for Accrington Stanley.
