= Fred Driver =

English footballer

Personal information
- Place of birth: England
- Position: Inside forward

Senior career*
Years	Team	Apps	(Gls)
1900–1903	Burnley	16	(2)
1903–1904	Trawden	?	(?)
1904–1905	Burnley	1	(0)
- * Club domestic league appearances and goals

Fred Driver was an English professional association footballer who played as an inside forward.
