= Leone Efrati =

Italian boxer (1916–1944)

- Born: May 16, 1916; Rome, Italy
- Died: April 16, 1944 (aged 27); Auschwitz
- Years active: 1938–1944

Leone Efrati (May 16, 1916 – April 16, 1944) was an Italian boxer.

== Biography ==
Efrati was born in Rome, Italy on May 16, 1916.

In December 1938, Efrati visited the U.S. and challenged Leo Rodak. He stayed in the U.S. until 1943.

In 1939, Efrati drew a fight with Pete Lello.

Efrati was murdered on April 16, 1944, in Auschwitz in Holocaust.

== Recognition ==
Efrati is a member of the International Jewish Sports Hall of Fame.

== See also ==
- Victor Perez
