= Russell Cuddihey =

English footballer

Personal information
- Full name: Russell Francis Cuddihey
- Date of birth: September 8, 1939 (age 87)
- Place of birth: Rawtenstall, England
- Position: Wing half

Senior career*
Years	Team	Apps	(Gls)
1960–1961	Accrington Stanley	10	(0)
- * Club domestic league appearances and goals

Russell Francis Cuddihey (born 8 September 1939) in Rawtenstall, England, is an English retired professional footballer who played as a wing half in the Football League.
