= Edward Lawrence Levy =

British weightlifter

- Levy, age 24
- Born: 21 December 1851; London, England
- Died: 1932
- Occupations: weightlifter, journalist
- Known for: Gold medal at 1891 World Weightlifting Championships

Edward Lawrence Levy
Medal record

Men's weightlifting

Representing the United Kingdom

World Championships
Gold medal – first place	1891 World Weightlifting Championships	

Edward Lawrence Levy (21 December 1851 – May 1932) was a British weightlifter.

== Career ==
Levy, who was Jewish, was born in London, England. He was a member of the Birmingham Athletic Club.

In February 1891, Levy won the first British Amateur Weightlifting Championship. Between 1891 and 1894, he established 14 world weightlifting records.

In March 1891, competing against champions from Brussels, Hamburg, England, Vienna, Italy, and Berlin in a three-day event, Levy won the first World Weightlifting Competition.

In 1896, at the first modern Olympics in Athens, he was a member of the International Weightlifting Jury. Levy founded the Amateur Gymnastics Federation of Great Britain and Ireland.

In 1988, he was inducted into the International Jewish Sports Hall of Fame.

E. Lawrence Levy began work for the drink trade (brewers) in 1891 as an assistant agent for the Midland District of the National Trade Defence Association. A few years he was promoted to agent, a position he held until his death. Licensed Trade News, 28 May 1932, pp. 1–2. (He had served as editor of this Birmingham-based newspaper.)

Otherwise he ran a Jewish school in Birmingham, was active in Conservative Party affairs (in a predominantly Liberal Unionist city) and in amateur theatricals, and served as choirmaster for a synagogue choir. He was a celebrated weightlifter who in middle age won many weightlifting titles (including the first British amateur weightlifting championship and the first world championship, both in 1891) and then served as a judge for weightlifting at the first modern Olympics in 1896.

Levy was a founder of the amateur gymnastic association for Great Britain and Ireland. He wrote numerous books, most of them published in Birmingham by J.G. Hammond and the others by the organisation that was the subject of the book). His books include The Midland Conservative Club (1883 and After) (1909), The Autobiography of an Athlete (1913), Birmingham Athletic Club, 1866–1916 (1916), The History of the Lodge of Israel, 1474, Warwickshire, 2 vols. (1916 and 1924), a Masonic lodge founded in 1874, Birmingham Theatrical Reminiscences. Jubilee Reflections (1870–1920) (1922), and Birmingham Jewry, 1870, Then, and 1929, Now (1929).

Levy served as honorary secretary of the political committee of the Midland Conservative Club from 1884 to 1890, when friction with Liberal Unionists forced him to resign. Levy, Midland Conservative Club, pp. 50–51, 58.

According to Somerset House, he left an estate of a little more than 1,874 pounds. For details about Levy's work for the drink trade, see David M. Fahey, "Brewers, Publicans, and Working Class Drinkers: Pressure Group Politics in Late Victorian and Edwardian England," Histoire sociale 13 (May 1980) See also David M. Fahey, ed., E.Lawrence Levy and Muscular Judaism, 1851–1932: Sport, Culture, and Assimilation in 19th-Century Britain (Edwin Mellen Press, 2015), which includes Levy's The Autobiography of an Athlete.

== Books ==
- Birmingham Jewry: 1870, then; and 1929, now, by Edward Lawrence Levy, Publisher J. G. Hammond

== See also ==
- List of select Jewish weightlifters
