= Richard Jerome =

English cricketer

Richard Jerome (born 4 April 1968) was an English cricketer. He was a right-handed batsman and right-arm off-break bowler who played for Hertfordshire. He was born in Edgware, Greater London.

Jerome made his debut in the Minor Counties Championship in 1994, and played in the competition until 1999. He made a single List A appearance for the team, during the 2000 NatWest Trophy, against Cambridgeshire, scoring one run, bowling ten overs and taking economical figures of 1–12.

In 2006, Jerome played two matches for Letchworth in the Cockspur Cup.
