= Ray Evans (footballer, born 1933) =

English footballer

Personal information
- Full name: Raymond Peter Evans
- Date of birth: 21 June 1933
- Place of birth: India
- Date of death: 26 June 2009 (aged 76)
- Place of death: Chorley, Lancashire, England
- Position: Inside forward

Youth career
- –1951: Preston North End

Senior career*
Years	Team	Apps	(Gls)
1951–1959	Preston North End	33	(2)
1959–1961	Bournemouth	36	(9)
1961–1975	Morecambe		
Total		69	(11)
- * Club domestic league appearances and goals

Raymond Peter Evans (21 June 1933 – 26 June 2009) was an English professional footballer who played as an inside forward in the Football League for Preston North End and Bournemouth.

== Early life and career ==
Evans was born in India while his Army father was serving in the country, but was raised in the New Hall Lane area of Preston.

After starting as a youth at Preston North End, Evans signed a part-time professional contract in May 1951 and played for the club until his transfer to Bournemouth in 1959. He and goalkeeper Mick Lynn were sold for a combined £4,000. He later played for Morecambe.

He died on 26 June 2009, five days after his 76th birthday.
