= Arthur Whittam =

English footballer

Personal information
- Full name: Arthur Whittam
- Place of birth: England
- Position: Centre forward

Senior career*
Years	Team	Apps	(Gls)
1903–1904	Burnley	4	(1)
- * Club domestic league appearances and goals

Arthur Whittam was an English professional footballer who played as a centre forward.
