= Steve Sandler (handballer) =

American handball player

- Born: Steve Sandler c. 1940
- Died: July 8, 2014
- Occupation: Handball player

Steve Sandler (1940 – July 8, 2014) was an American handball player.

== Biography ==
Sandler was born in 1940.

Between 1966 and 1971, Sandler won the U.S. Handball Association Singles Championship six consecutive times.

In 1985, Sandler was elected to the Handball Hall of Fame.

Sandler died July 8, 2014.
