= James Brae =

English footballer

Personal information
- Full name: James Brae
- Position: Defender

Senior career*
Years	Team	Apps	(Gls)
1896–1897	Burnley	6	(0)
- * Club domestic league appearances and goals

James Brae was a professional English footballer who played as a central defender.
