= Robert Lowe (English footballer) =

English footballer

Personal information
- Place of birth: England
- Position: Inside forward

Senior career*
Years	Team	Apps	(Gls)
- Congleton Town
1903–1905	Burnley	3	(0)
- * Club domestic league appearances and goals

Robert H. Lowe was an English professional footballer who played as an inside forward. He played three matches in the Football League for Burnley.
