= Barney Nagler =

American sportswriter and author (1912–1990)

- Born: August 24, 1912; Brooklyn, New York, U.S.
- Died: October 22, 1990 (aged 78); Freehold Township, New Jersey, U.S.
- Education: New York University
- Occupations: Sports journalist, boxing writer
- Awards: Nat Fleischer Award (1972), James J. Walker Award (1973), Walter Haight Award (1978), James A. Farley Award (1989), International Jewish Sports Hall of Fame (1992), International Boxing Hall of Fame (2004)

Barney Nagler (August 24, 1912 – October 22, 1990) was an American sportswriter and author.

== Early life and education ==
Nagler was born on August 24, 1912, in Brooklyn, New York, United States.

Following his graduation from Franklin K. Lane High School, he pursued a journalism degree at New York University.

== Career ==
After working at the New York Post, Philadelphia Evening Ledger, and Newark Star Eagle, he became the Bronx Home News boxing writer in 1937, succeeding Harry Markson.

Nagler wrote for the Colgate Sports Newsreel, a national radio program hosted by Bill Stern.

His daily column, On Second Thought, debuted in the New York Morning Telegraph in 1950 and moved to the Daily Racing Form after the Telegraph shut down in 1972, continuing until 1990. Focusing mainly on boxing and thoroughbred racing, he won several awards for his work.

In the 1950s and 1960s, he produced and wrote sports content for the American Broadcasting Company (ABC) and the National Broadcasting Company (NBC). He is credited with naming Wide World of Sports. His work included segments for Wide World of Sports, the 1964 Winter Olympics, and the Grand National at Aintree Racecourse.

Nagler authored various books on boxing. He wrote James Norris and the Decline of Boxing, published by Bobbs-Merrill Company in 1964. He released a biography about Joe Louis titled Brown Bomber: The Pilgrimage of Joe Louis in 1971.

Between 1960 and 1980, Nagler served multiple terms as president of the New York Boxing Writers Association. He served a five-year term as president of the Boxing Writers Association of America, from 1984 to 1989.

== Death ==
Nagler died on October 22, 1990, at age 78, at CentraState Medical Center in Freehold Township, New Jersey.

== Legacy ==
Barney Nagler was the first recipient of the Nat Fleischer Award for "Excellence in Boxing Journalism" from the Boxing Writers Association of America in 1972, followed by the James J. Walker Award for "Long and Meritorious Service" in 1973. The award was later renamed the Barney Nagler Award after him. He was also honored with the BWAA's James A. Farley Award in 1989 for "Honesty and Integrity."

The National Turf Writers Association honored Nagler with the Walter Haight Award in 1978 for his excellence in coverage of thoroughbred racing.

Barney Nagler was inducted into the International Jewish Sports Hall of Fame in 1992 and the International Boxing Hall of Fame in 2004.

== Books ==
- James Norris and the Decline of Boxing (1964)
- The American Horse (1966)
- Brown Bomber: The Pilgrimage of Joe Louis (1972)
- Only the Ring was Square (1981)
- Shoemaker: America's Greatest Jockey (1988)
