= James A. Farley Award =

American boxing award

- Sport: Boxing
- Awarded for: "Honesty and Integrity"
- Location: U.S.
- Presented by: Boxing Writers Association of America

History
- First award: 1977
- First winner: Harry Markson
- Most recent: Greg Sirb

The James A. Farley Award is an award conferred by the Boxing Writers Association of America (BWAA) for Honesty and Integrity. The award is named after American politician James A. Farley.

== History ==
The award, established in 1977, was named for James A. Farley, former New York State Athletic Commissioner and devoted supporter of boxing.

The award is periodically presented to individuals who exemplify lifelong integrity in the sport of boxing.

The first recipient of the James A. Farley Award was Harry Markson, former president of Madison Square Garden. Rarely awarded by the BWAA, there have been only 19 recipients of the James A. Farley Award.

== Past recipients ==
- 1977 – (United States) Harry Markson
- 1984 – (United States) John F.X. Condon
- 1985 – (United States) Murray Goodman
- 1989 – (United States) Barney Nagler
- 1995 – (United States) Marvin Kohn
- 1996 – (United States) Eddie Futch
- 2005 – (United States) Howie Albert, Angelo Dundee, Dr. Margaret Goodman, Dr. Flip Homansky
- 2006 – (United States) Ron Scott Stevens
- 2009 – (United States) Mills Lane
- 2010 – (United States) Micky Ward
- 2011 – (Ukraine) Wladimir & Vitali Klitschko
- 2013 – (United States) John Sheppard
- 2015 – (United States) Lou DiBella
- 2016 – (United States) David Berlin
- 2018 – (United States) Greg Sirb
- 2020 – None
- 2021 – None
- 2022 – None
- 2023 – None
- 2024 – None
- 2025 - None

== See also ==
- Boxing Writers Association of America
