= Teddy Brenner =

American boxing matchmaker and promoter (1918–2000)

- Born: Theodore Brenner; 1918; Borough Park, Brooklyn, New York, U.S.
- Died: January 7, 2000 (aged 81–82); Manhattan, New York, U.S.
- Occupations: Boxing matchmaker Boxing promoter

Teddy Brenner (1918 – January 7, 2000) was an American boxing matchmaker and promoter of boxing matches at Madison Square Garden. He was inducted into the International Boxing Hall of Fame in 1993.

== Early life ==
Theodore "Teddy" Brenner was born in 1918 in Brooklyn, New York, United States. His father, a Jewish immigrant from Poland, worked as a leather cutter and designer.

Growing up in Borough Park, Brenner played sports like punchball, stickball, and craps. At James Madison High School, he excelled in basketball and befriended boxers at Crystal Gym in Brooklyn. His interest in boxing grew after meeting Irving Cohen, a boxing instructor at the Jewish Community Center of Bensonhurst.

== Career ==
Following high school, Brenner worked as a shipping clerk and salesman for a Manhattan shirt manufacturer. In his free time, he spent weekends at Lou Stillman's Gym in Manhattan.

Teddy Brenner entered boxing in 1937, but his career was halted by service in the Second World War. After serving in the Pacific as a Seabee with the United States Navy in World War II, he returned home in 1946 and transitioned back into boxing.

He and Irving Cohen, who was a matchmaker at a small club in New Brunswick, New Jersey, made the weekly trip to N.J. for the club's fights. On the drive back to Brooklyn, he often asked, "Why did you match so-and-so with so-and-so?" Cohen, busy managing fighters like Rocky Graziano, passed matchmaking duties at the New Brunswick boxing club, to him that year. His expertise in matchmaking soon brought him to Manhattan's 3,500-seat St. Nicholas Arena, operated by Madison Square Garden.

Brenner matched Joe Louis vs. Jersey Joe Walcott which was hosted at the Garden in December 1947.

=== International Boxing Club ===
Brenner later served in an assistant matchmaking capacity for the International Boxing Club of New York under James D. Norris, a powerful yet corrupt boxing figure. Their partnership spanned 1949 and 1950. As Al Weill's assistant matchmaker, he resigned from the IBC in 1950, alleging Weill and the IBC instructed him to fix a fight. He recalled Norris saying, "What are you worried about? If I ask you to use certain fighters every once and a while, don't ask any questions," to which he replied, "Jim, one day the ---- is going to hit the fan. And when it does, I don't want to be here." The matchmaker left and started a club in Brooklyn.

=== Eastern Parkway Arena ===
In 1952, Brenner became the matchmaker of Brooklyn's Eastern Parkway Arena. Under Brenner's direction, the arena gained a reputation as the "House of Upsets." He notably matched Floyd Patterson in 13 fights at Eastern Parkway during his rise under Cus D'Amato, with Patterson winning 12 of the bouts.

Brenner and promoter Emil Lence cut a deal with the DuMont Television Network in 1953 to televise fights on Monday nights from the arena. Boxing from Eastern Parkway changed networks in May 1954, moving from DuMont to the American Broadcasting Company.

=== St. Nicholas Arena ===
After ABC ended its broadcast deal in 1955, Brenner returned to St. Nicholas Arena, where the Du Mont network aired its Monday night fights. This time, he handled both promotion and matchmaking duties as the New York Boxing Club Inc. using his own funds. The first fight card presented by Brenner's New York Boxing Club at the arena took place on April 9, 1956. An undefeated Rory Calhoun fought Jackie LaBua in front of a crowd of 1,800, generating a live gate of $3,652.

During his time at Eastern Parkway and St. Nicholas Arena, he "discovered Tommy Hurricane Jackson, introduced Gene Fullmer, and nurtured Joey Giardello."

=== Madison Square Garden ===
His previous employer, the Norris-led IBC organization, was ruled a monopoly in 1957 and removed as the Garden's operator. Harry Markson assumed control of the Garden's boxing program and brought in the St. Nicholas Arena promoter for matchmaking duties in 1959. Succeeding Jack Barrett, Brenner was announced as matchmaker for the venue on April 20, 1959, by Ned Irish. He chose Duke Stefano as his assistant.

Accused of prejudice by boxer Jimmy Dupree in 1965, Brenner faced pressure from the NAACP. Given ticket sales' importance in matchmaking, Brenner agreed to match Dupree with Johnny Persol when the organization offered to sell $10,000 in tickets. He later claimed only two $3 tickets had been sold by them and the rest were returned.

==== Vice President ====
After seeking a $10,000 raise in 1969, the Garden matchmaker was instead given a $5,000 raise and promoted to vice president of Madison Square Garden Boxing, Inc. As the main figure in selecting and negotiating with fighters, Brenner was given considerable freedom by Markson, who held the final responsibility for the Garden's boxing shows and their financial outcomes. Brenner considered himself the best matchmaker in the business. He understood the fan appeal of closely matched, unpredictable bouts. One-time fight manager Marv Jensen said, "Teddy will match a guy you wouldn't think had a chance against another. But he knows different. He knows this guy has a style or an asset that will offset advantages of the other guy. And he also knows the drawing power of the fighters. He can predict within a few dollars what a match will draw. He knows the heartbeat of a fighter—and the fight fan."

Brenner was instrumental in the development of Joe Frazier. He made the match of Frazier against Jimmy Ellis at the Garden on February 16, 1970. In 1971, he staged the first heavyweight championship bout between 26-0 Joe Frazier and 31-0 Muhammad Ali, dubbed the "Fight of the Century". The Garden saw the two undefeated fighters collide on March 8, 1971, with 7-0 Rahaman Ali headlining the co-main event. The next morning, Brenner quipped, "I got both Alis knocked off on the same night," referring to Rahaman and Muhammad Ali's losses. Through the matchmaking of Teddy Brenner, the Garden saw Emile Griffith, Floyd Patterson, Roberto Durán, Earnie Shavers, and Ali take their first loss.

==== President ====
Teddy Brenner was promoted to president of boxing at the Garden when Harry Markson retired on March 31, 1973. Markson said, "Teddy Brenner is the best man in boxing today. There is no one who knows the game as well as he. If anyone can keep boxing at a top flight at the Garden, Teddy Brenner can."

In the summer of 1973, Teddy Brenner was introduced to heavyweight contender Earnie Shavers by Don King, who proposed a title bout at the Garden with Jerry Quarry. Instead, Quarry pulled out, and Shavers faced former champion Jimmy Ellis, securing a first-round knockout victory. Shortly after, Brenner invested $7,000 in promoting the Quarry vs. Shavers fight at Madison Square Garden, only for it to be postponed after Shavers fractured his jaw while sparring. Brenner rescheduled the postponed bout for December 1973, ending in Shavers' defeat. King resented Brenner for refusing to give Shavers a redemption fight at the Garden. Years later, Brenner staged the September 1977 Muhammad Ali vs. Earnie Shavers fight for a sell-out crowd at the Garden. Brenner, heading Madison Square Garden Boxing, thought Ali should step away from the sport even though he had beaten Shavers and remained a major draw. He had made the suggestion to Ali's manager Jabir Herbert Muhammad. Brenner vowed to never make Ali an offer to fight at the Garden again, stating "if Madison Square Garden wants him (Ali) back, they will have to replace me to do it." He said, "I never thought I'd live to see the day when Muhammad Ali's greatest asset was his ability to take a punch."

When Sonny Werblin became head of the Madison Square Garden Corporation in January 1978, the boxing program at the legendary arena was in a state of decline. Disagreements over match decisions and Brenner's displeasure with Don King's move into the Garden led to Werblin dismissing Brenner and replacing him with Gil Clancy.

In September 1978, the Garden's longest-serving matchmaker's tenure ended and he became an independent boxing promoter. His plan was to put together fight packages for television, targeting either a well-established network or Teddy Brenner Fights, Inc. The following month, he finalized a three-year promotional contract with Alexis Argüello and his manager, Dr. Eduardo Roman.

=== Top Rank ===
The longtime matchmaker joined Bob Arum's Top Rank, Inc. in 1979. He set up the 1983 Davey Moore vs. Roberto Durán fight. He was active in matchmaking until 1987.

== Personal life ==
With his wife, Judy, he had a son, Richard, a resident doctor at Stanford University, and a daughter, Marsha, who taught French at Berkeley.

== Death ==
Teddy Brenner died at 82 years old on January 7, 2000, in Manhattan, New York, United States. Brenner died of Parkinson's disease at Memorial Sloan Kettering Hospital.

== Legacy ==
The Boxing Writers Association of America (BWAA) honored Brenner in 1971, presenting him with the Barney Nagler Award for "meritorious service" to boxing.

Brenner is credited with coining the phrase "Styles make fights."

In 1981, he released an autobiography titled Only the Ring Was Square in collaboration with sports writer Barney Nagler.

Brenner was later inducted into the International Boxing Hall of Fame in 1993. Promoter Bob Arum said, "There will never be another matchmaker like Teddy Brenner."
