= Micky Ward =

American boxer

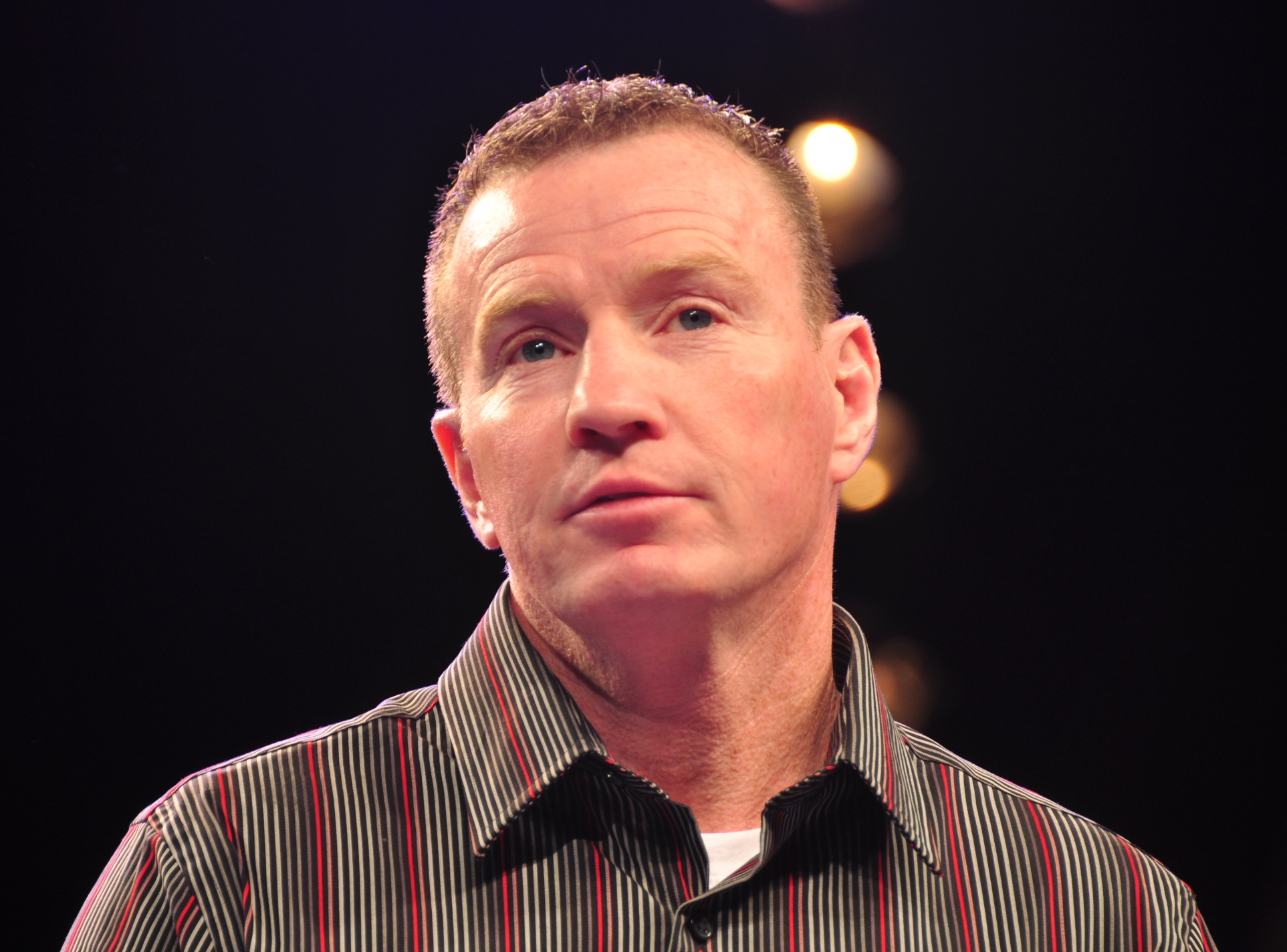
- Ward in 2011

Personal information
- Nickname: "Irish"
- Born: George Michael Ward Jr. October 4, 1965 (age 61) Lowell, Massachusetts, U.S.
- Height: 5 ft 8 in (173 cm)
- Weight: Light welterweight, welterweight

Boxing career
- Reach: 70 in (178 cm)
- Stance: Orthodox

Boxing record
- Total fights: 51
- Wins: 38
- Win by KO: 27
- Losses: 13

George Michael Ward Jr. (born October 4, 1965), often known by his nickname, "Irish" Micky Ward, is an American former professional boxer who competed from 1985 to 2003. He challenged once for the IBF light welterweight title in 1997, and held the WBU light welterweight title in 2000. Ward is widely known for his trilogy of fights with Arturo Gatti, two of which received Fight of the Year awards by The Ring magazine, as well as his devastating left hook to the body and his relentless pressure fighting style. From 2001 to 2003, Ward featured in three straight Fights of the Year. He was portrayed by Mark Wahlberg in the 2010 film The Fighter, which was based on his early career. After retirement he has become a philanthropist.

After winning numerous titles at the amateur level Ward turned pro in 1985. His career was separated into two parts with him going into his first retirement in 1991. Then making a comeback in 1994 where he would go on to reach the top of the boxing world. With his first bout versus Arturo Gatti being viewed as one of the best of all time by fans and writers alike.

Throughout his career Ward was able to win over fans with his toughness, entertaining fights and his Blue-Collar life style which has led to him being referred to as "The real life Rocky"

He is viewed as a legendary figure in his hometown of Lowell, and revered by many fans and observers of the sport.

== Ancestry and early life ==
Ward's maternal great-grandmother, Annie Greenhalge (Carroll), was born in Ireland, the daughter of Michael and Mary (Flood) Carroll. His maternal great-great-great grandparents, Peter McMahon and Ann Quinn, were from County Tyrone, Ireland. They fled Ireland during the 1850s to escape poverty and arrived in Boston, Massachusetts. They settled in the Acre neighborhood of Lowell, and worked as laborers and millworkers. Ward was born to his parents Alice and George Sr. Born George Michael Ward Jr he was nicknamed Micky by his family at an early age. He grew up in Lowell with his brother Dicky along with seven sisters. Besides boxing, Ward also played a variety of other sports growing up, such as baseball, as well as earning a reputation as a formidable free safety on the gridiron and establishing himself as a worthy wrestler on the mats, even winning a Lowell city tournament in junior high. Ward attended Lowell High school.

At the age of 12 Ward sat ringside when his brother Dicky fought Sugar Ray Leonard. Ward later credited his brother as his inspiration for starting his boxing career. Dicky struggled with legal and substance abuse problems, but still served as Ward's trainer for his entire career.

Wards Mother Alice would serve as his manager for much of his early boxing career.

At an early age Ward started working as a road-paver. One time while on the job a Ward suffered a freak accident where a hand tamper went up his rear side. This left Ward in critical condition resulting in him needing reconstructive surgery. In later interviews Ward has jokingly referred to the incident as "The biggest pain in the ass he has ever had". Ward was fighting pro while this happened and made a full recovery 10 months later.

== Amateur career ==
In 1972, at age seven, Ward competed in his first amateur bout, the start of a successful amateur career. In 1977, at age eleven, he entered and advanced to the finals of the New England Junior Olympics, before dropping a close decision to a fighter from Lynn in the championship. However, he ended up winning the tournament the following year in 1978. With his brother Dicky by his side, Ward climbed up the amateur rankings. In 1980, he won gold in the 90-pound division at Silver Mittens after finishing runner up in 1978 and 1979. In 1983, he fought and won the New England AAU tournament, earning a trip to Lake Placid, New York for the regional finals. There, he met and befriended a 16-year-old Mike Tyson, who was also competing in the tournament's heavyweight division. Ward won the regional tournament at the 139 pound division, then earning a trip to the nationals in Colorado Springs. Ward was also a three-time New England Golden Gloves champion boxer. He finished with an amateur record of 62-10.

== Professional career ==
=== Early career ===
Ward had his first professional bout on June 13, 1985 in Lawrence, Massachusetts, defeating David Morin by TKO in the first round. He won his second fight in his hometown of Lowell, getting a 4th round TKO victory over Greg Young.

Coming off back-to-back knockout wins in his home state of Massachusetts, Ward traveled to Atlantic City to meet matchmaker Teddy Brenner. Looking to push his career forward, Ward quickly applied to on a card down in Atlantic City. However, New Jersey Athletic Commission rules stated that fighters must wait a mandatory two weeks between bouts, so when Ward's team was filling out the paperwork to be on the Atlantic City card, they bumped up the date of his last fight in order to fall into the criteria of this mandate. The NJ athletic commissioner Joe Walcott caught the oversight and suspended Ward for an unspecified period. Walcott retired in December 1985, and Larry Hazzard took over his position, lifting Ward's suspension immediately and giving him a clean slate. Hazzard later stated, "Waiving Micky Ward's suspension is one of the best decisions I've ever made."

With his suspension lifted, Ward made his Atlantic City debut on January 10, 1986 with a 3rd round TKO of Chris Bajor. This kicked off Ward's relationship with the city, as his next six fights would all take place there. He won all six, four of them coming by way of KO. His time in Atlantic City helped his career due to the exposure he received on national television through ESPN's Top Rank Boxing program, which dubbed Atlantic City their home base for their weekly Saturday night fights. Ward ended up with a record 28 fights on ESPN.

However, for his 10th professional fight on August 29, 1986, Top Rank Boxing followed Ward back to his home town of Lowell. There, he faced a fellow top prospect out of Massachusetts, John Rafuse. The fight ended in an 8th round unanimous decision for Ward. Two more convincing wins followed, first on October 24, with a second round KO of Carlos Brandi and an eighth round split decision over Hilario Mercedes on February 27, 1987 brought his record to 12-0.

Ward got the call to be on the undercard for the April 6, 1987 "Fight of the Century", marking the first time he would head out west to fight in Las Vegas. Ward made the most of this opportunity, beating Kelly Koble via TKO in the 4th round. He returned to Atlantic City for his next bout vs Derrick McGuire on August 25, once again winning by TKO in the 4th round, improving to 14-0. During his next fight on September 25, he came up short to Edwin Curet by split decision, losing his first professional fight. He recovered nicely though, as he got a first round TKO of Joey Ferrell in his next fight on January 15, 1988. He then picked up back-to-back unanimous decision victories over Joey Oliver on February 19, and David Silva on May 19.

In Ward's next fight which took place on September 9, 1988 he faced Mike Mungin, Mungin, a replacement for Ward's original opponent, came into the fight 20 pounds of muscle overweight. Even though Ward gave up nearly three weight classes to his opponent, he was still able to put up a close fight, but ultimately lost via unanimous decision. Coming off this frustrating loss, he scored a 3rd round TKO of Francisco Tomas da Cruz in his following bout on December 13. After accumulating a 19-2 record, Ward would earn his first title shot when he fought Frankie Warren on January 15, 1989 for the USBA light welterweight title, but he failed to capture the title, losing in a unanimous decision. Ward won his next two bouts, getting a 5th round TKO of Clarence Coleman on May 23, 1989 and a split decision over David Rivello on February 3, 1990.

However, his career leveled off, and after some tough match making he lost his next four fights in 1990/91. The first loss came on April 26, 1990 when he faced Harold Brazier for the IBF Inter-Continental light welterweight title, losing by unanimous decision. In his next fight he faced Charles Murray on October 18, for the USBA light welterweight title, once again losing via unanimous decision. Then following two more unanimous decision losses In May and October 1991, Ward decided to go into his first retirement from boxing to focus on being a father to his daughter Kasie, and to work and live a regular blue-collar life.

=== Hiatus ===
During Ward's time away from the sport, he used funds from his day job on a road-paving crew to have surgery on his right hand, which had given him problems during several bouts. The surgery used some of the bone from his pelvis to strengthen and fuse the bones in his hand. During this period Ward also worked as a correctional officer at the Middlesex House of Correction.

During his hiatus many of Wards family and friends would ask him if he missed the sport he later recalled “I would tell them I was good with where I am at. I’m happy doing what I’m doing.” Ward eventually found himself back in a boxing gym when Lowell Police Chief Mickey O'Keefe asked Ward to come by his gym and work out with him a little. "It was a no pressure offer so I did. As soon as I got back in there it felt good. I did miss it. Slowly I started getting in there a little more and more and before you knew it we were training somewhat regularly." O'Keefe implemented strength-based drills and exercises. The results gave Ward a new level of raw strength and confidence, helping lead him to his eventual return to the ring. Besides Ward's physical changes, there was a second noticeable change as well. Before his retirement in 1991, his style had been similar to his brother Dicky's, with lots of movement. With his new physique and his increased power, he wanted to refine his approach in the ring. Ward stated, "I wasn't going to be dancing anymore. I was going to move forward and punch with intention." When his longtime head trainer, his brother Dicky, was released from jail, Ward was finally ready to make a comeback.

Ward still worked his road paving job throughout the rest of his boxing career in between fights.

=== Comeback ===
Ward made a successful comeback, having his first bout in nearly three years on June 17, 1994. He got a 5th round TKO vs Luis Castillo. From September 1994 to March 1995, he fought four more times winning all four bouts via KO/TKO. This led to him earning a shot at the WBU intercontinental light welterweight title vs the undefeated 31-0 Louis Veader. The bout took place on April 16, 1996, at the FleetCenter in Boston Massachusetts. Ward dropped Veader with a left hook to the body in the 9th round, winning the title by TKO. He granted Veader an immediate rematch three months later, successfully defending the title, winning by unanimous decision.

Coming off back-to-back wins, Ward was scheduled to fight Julio Cesar Chavez on December 6, 1996. The bout would be the biggest of his career. On December 1, five days before the fight, Chavez pulled out of the match, claiming he had hurt his hand while training. Against the advice of his team, Ward took a last-minute replacement fight vs Manny Castillo. The fight was a 10 round slugfest, but Ward ultimately won via split decision.

During his next fight in a spot of the main card of Pernell Whitaker vs. Oscar De La Hoya, a April 12, 1997, match that would come to typify the exceptional power of Ward's left hook to the body, he scored a 7th-round knockout against the then-undefeated 16-0 Mexican Alfonso Sanchez in a fight that Ward, up to then, was clearly losing on points. Shortly before the punch, Emanuel Augustus said the fight should be stopped (which referee Mitch Halpern had threatened to do if Ward didn't "show [him] something"). Afterwards, HBO boxing commentator Larry Merchant called it one of the most extraordinary things he'd ever seen in boxing.

Ward's left hook to the body later resulted in a first-round knockout of Steve Quinonez, and a nine-count knockdown of Arturo Gatti in their first fight.

After going on a nine-fight winning streak since his comeback, Ward earned a IBF Light Welterweight Championship fight against champion Vince Phillips on August 9, 1997. However did not win the championship, as the fight was stopped in the third round due to cuts, and Phillips was awarded the bout via TKO. This was the only stoppage loss of Ward's entire career. After the fight, he was told by his doctor that if the cut had gone any deeper, he could have lost sight in his eye. Ward took eight months off to fully recover.

Making his return on April 14, 1998, he got a 3rd round KO victory over Mark Fernandez. However, Ward again came up short in a title fight on June 7, as he would give Zab Judah a competitive fight but ultimately lost a 12-round decision. Judah later credited Ward as the toughest fight of his career. After this, Ward strung together back-to-back wins, beating Jose Mendez by 3rd round TKO on March 17, 1999 and forcing a 5th round RTD of Jermal Corbin on July 16.

=== Ward vs. Reggie Green ===
Ward then found himself back in another high caliber match up vs WBA contender Reggie Green on October 1, 1999, who had taken then-WBA light welterweight champion Sharmba Mitchell to a majority decision in his previous fight. Green dominated most of the early rounds, resulting in multiple cuts on Ward's face and splitting his lip. He had Ward up against the ropes on staggery legs during the 3rd round, but he somehow didn't go down. For the next five rounds, the two swung at a frantic pace. Throughout the fight, Ward was willing to take two punches to give one, and keep pushing forward, even though this strategy had him falling behind on points. Green led on the scorecards going into the final round. Ward slowly climbed back into the fight, eventually hitting Green with a flurry of body shots, resulting in a 10th round TKO with just 30 seconds left in the fight. The bout became an instant classic, and was runner up for the 1999 fight of the year.

After the fight, Teddy Atlas remarked, "That was truly fighting. This is a barbaric thing at the core of it. It ain't always pretty but it's real. Like the mobsters say, that was a real guy up there. When it came down to what a fighter is about, Micky Ward was it. That is what a fight is and you don't see it too often no more".

=== Ward vs. Shea Neary ===
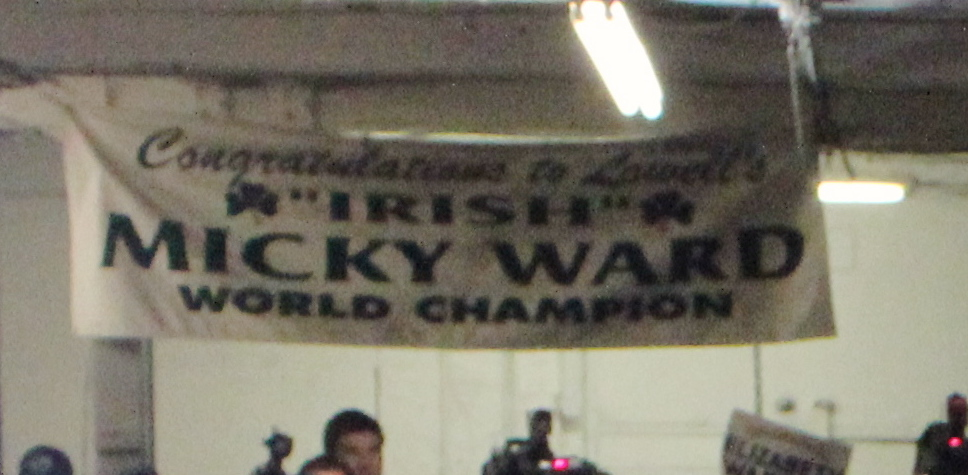
Ward’s Championship banner that was hung in gym in Lowell

After coming off his big win vs Green, Ward traveled to London in March 2000 to challenge the undefeated 22-0 WBU Light Welterweight Champion, Shea Neary, in the co-main event of Naseem Hamed vs. Vuyani Bungu. The fight was a high-paced, action-packed slugfest. Ward hurt Neary early on in the fight with two big shots in the 1st and 4th rounds, but Neary slowly started to take over the middle rounds, being up on the score cards going into the 8th. Ward started to take over during that round, knocking Neary down with a body hook/left uppercut combo then earning a TKO soon after winning the WBU world championship. Despite receiving boos from the London fans during his entrance they gave him a round of applause following his win. This put an end to Neary's four year reign. At the end of the fight, HBO commentator Larry Merchant simply stated, "He's done it again folks".

Ward, however, never defended the title. In his next fight, he ended up in a contenders' bout vs Antonio Díaz on August 19, 2000. The fight was competitive, resulting in a close unanimous 95-94 decision loss for Ward. He then faced Steve Quinonez on May 18, 2001, making quick work of him with a 1st round KO, drilling Quinonez with a double left hook to the head before curling him up with that signature hook to the body.

=== Ward vs. Emanuel Augustus ===
Ward's following fight, which saw him get a ten-round unanimous decision victory over Emanuel Augustus (then known as Emanuel Burton), was voted The Ring magazine's 2001 Fight of the Year as well as ESPN's 2001 Fight of the Year. The majority of the fight saw the two men standing right in front of each other. Ward was able to walk Augustus against the ropes for a good portion of the evening, where Augustus was more than comfortable exchanging punches. The fight has also been described as thirty minutes of chaotic, intense, non-stop carnage with both fighters throwing punches to the point of exhaustion, with Ward scoring a knockdown in the 9th round with a left hook to the body. At the end of the 4th round, Teddy Atlas stated, "Fans, at this break, call all your friends. We're in the midst of a classic." The fight was later voted by network viewers as ESPN's fight of the decade.

=== Ward vs. Jesse James Leija ===
After his fight of the year, Ward had a meeting with Lou DiBella to lay out a three-fight proposal for Ward. These would earn him some big money, as well as give him good opponents to enhance his growing legacy. The proposal consisted of fighting contender Jesse James Leija and then either a title shot vs Kostya Tszyu or a bout vs Arturo Gatti.

Ward faced Jesse James Leija in Leija's home state of Texas. Ward started the fight by landing a hard left hook to the head in the first, as blood began to trickle out of Leija's eyebrow. However, referee Laurence Cole paused the fight. Cole told the ringside judges to ignore the impact of the cut, because, he claimed, it was the result of an accidental headbutt. Later, multiple replay angles confirmed this to be an incorrect ruling by Cole. The fight was stopped after the 4th round, resulting in a controversial split technical decision loss for Ward.

After the fight, DiBella assured Ward that he would not be penalized for the controversial loss and their previous agreement was still on.

=== Ward vs. Gatti trilogy and legacy ===
On May 18, 2002, Ward faced the opponent with whom he became most identified, Arturo Gatti. Little did both men know that it would end up being one of the best bouts of all time. The fight was a wild one, highlighted by its intense back-and-forth nature. Gatti came out fast, leaving a cut near Ward's eye not even halfway through the first round. The two men continued to exchange shots, but Gatti hit Ward with a low blow in the third round. The fight picked up intensity during the fifth round, a barbaric round that epitomized the next 25 minutes between the two men. Ward began to turn the bout into his type of fight: he wanted a brawl. Gatti unloaded a flurry of 12 unanswered punches that backed Ward to the ropes. Just as Gatti took a step back to catch his breath, Ward responded with his own 12-punch combo that sent Gatti spiraling back. By the start of the 6th round, both men were a bloody mess. Gatti started to take over the next two rounds. However, during the 8th, when Gatti was moving forward, unleashing combination after combination, he was stopped in his tracks by one pinpoint left from Ward, a punch which clearly hurt him. Gatti began backpedaling as Ward started to unloaded with everything he had as the 8th round came to an end. What came next was one of the most notable rounds in all of boxing. The 9th round started with Ward walking Gatti down, hitting him with his signature tap to the head, then hitting his signature left hook to the liver, gaining a crucial knockdown. Gatti miraculously got up, and the two men continued to throw punch after punch in dramatic fashion. During the ninth round alone, Gatti landed over 40 power punches and Ward landed over 60. After one more round, the fight came to a end, with Ward winning a majority decision. It was the chance Ward had been waiting for his entire career.

This was named the 2002 Ring magazine fight of the year, as well as the Boxing Writers Association of America fight of the year. The bout has been acclaimed as the "Fight of the Century" by boxing fans and writers. The 9th round of the fight, which saw both men exchange brutal shot after brutal shot, has been referred to as the Round of the Century by Emanuel Steward and other boxing writers. It was also named The Ring magazine Round of the Year and USA Today's round of the year. Both fighters needed care in a trauma center after the match.

The two agreed to an immediate rematch. In November, Gatti won the second wild fight, knocking Ward down in the third round, although he survived to finish the fight. Gatti paid tribute to Ward's tenacity after the fight, saying, "I used to wonder what would happen if I fought my twin. Now I know."

They agreed to a third straight fight, and again the fight was back-and-forth and chaotic. Gatti pounded Ward with punch after punch early on, but Ward fought back and managed a sixth round knockdown. Before Gatti could get up, or the referee's count could hit ten, the bell sounded to end the round. The two men continued to crack each other with big shots, but Gatti ultimately won via a unanimous decision. Again, both men needed a trip to the hospital, due to the injuries they suffered. The fight was named the 2003 Ring magazine fight of the year, the third straight for Ward. Ward was the first fighter to achieve this since Rocky Marciano and Carmen Basilio had done so in the 1950s. Ward made approximately $3 million in earnings for his trilogy with Gatti; these were the most lucrative fights of his career.

Before the third fight, Ward announced it would be his last. Even after promoters loosely floated a couple of potential big money fights his way, he stayed true to his word and retired.

By the end of the trilogy, Ward and Gatti had created a strong friendship. When asked about their bond after Gatti's death, Ward said, "We were more than fighters; we were brothers. Every punch we threw at each other brought us closer. Losing him was like losing a part of myself."

Ward's fights with Gatti remain popular among many fans and writers, and some consider the trilogy to be one of the greatest of all time. Gatti vs Ward I & III are also part of HBO's 10 best fights of the decade.

On August 14, 2003 a retirement party for Ward was held at Mohegan Sun in Connecticut. Jim Lampley, Larry Merchant and Lou DiBella all gave speeches at the event and Arturo Gatti gifted Ward a diamond ring in celebration of their trilogy and then showed him a matching ring he had got for himself.

Ward is still remembered for his unmatched heart, grit, brutal fights and devastating left hook to the liver. New England sports writer Joe Gil summed up Ward's career, stating, "After setbacks in his professional and personal lives, Ward was able to rise to the top of the boxing world due to his determination and undying desire. He was a man of the blue collared people of Lowell and took them all on an incredible journey."

== Life after boxing ==
Ward still lives in Lowell, where he is part owner of both a boxing gym as well as an outdoor hockey rink.

He is married to Charlene Fleming, his longtime girlfriend, who is also a former athlete. He also has a daughter named Kasie from a previous relationship.

He manages the boxing gym he owns with his Nephew Sean. With his brother Dicky Eklund, training new boxers entering its academy. In late 2024 the duo expanded the gym's size, adding additional recourses such as a sauna and cold plunge tanks.

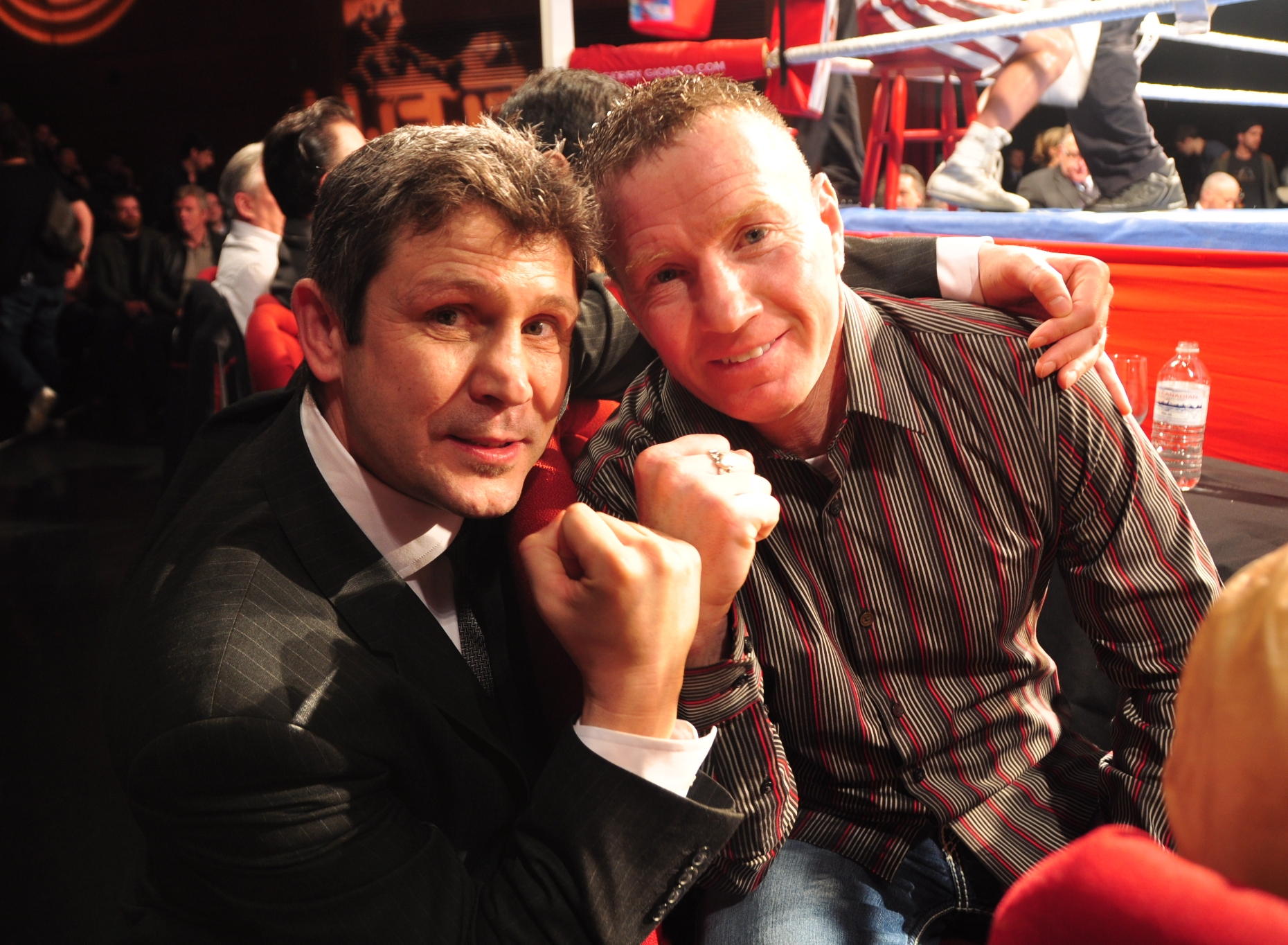
Ward with Manny Sobral at a boxing event

Even after retirement, Ward went back to his old blue collar job of paving roads, stating, "I was going crazy not working." He also trains a few fighters, and served as Arturo Gatti's head trainer for his last fight. Ward also frequently went to Florida to help train some of Mike Tyson's fighters. In addition Ward has also helped train MMA fighters such as Rob Font and Calvin Katter. Ward alongside his brother Dicky would also train their Nephew Sean Eklund who also became a professional boxer.

He stepped away from coaching in the mid-2010s, saying he was burned out from boxing. However he would ultimately return, and currently serves as a boxing coach for Charles Rosa and other local fighters at his gym.

Ward is also a motivational speaker.

He is still heavily involved with the sport, as he attends the International Boxing Hall of Fame every year, interacting with fans. He gave a speech at Arturo Gatti's induction in 2013, and served as the grand marshal of the parade in 2011. He is a regular at local boxing events in Massachusetts, and also enjoys watching MMA.

Ward is involved in yearly St Patrick's day celebrations across Massachusetts. Even leading the Cape Cod St. Patrick's Day Parade in 2011.

In his 2012 autobiography, Ward revealed that he had been sexually abused as a child by a friend of Dicky's, another boxer referred to only by his nickname, "Hammer". The abuse began when Ward was nine years old and continued for approximately three years, until he gained the confidence to confront his attacker. Ward eventually faced off against Hammer in one of his first amateur bouts, winning by unanimous decision.

Ward has become a proponent of brain trauma education. He has been open with his own experiences with the condition, along with doing work with the Concussion Legacy Foundation. He has pledged his brain and part of his spinal column to Boston University to help further the study of CTE to help future boxers and other athletes.

On August 27, 2009 the Lowell Spinners held "Mickey Ward Bobble Head Night". Ward was in attendance for the game and was honored by the team prior to the game. On June 19, 2026, the new iteration of the Lowell Spinners also held a "Mickey Ward Bobble Head Night" where Ward threw out the ceremonial first pitch.

Ward, who is a fan of the local Boston sports teams, dropped the ceremonial puck at a Boston Bruins game on February 11, 2011. On September 21 of that year, he threw out the ceremonial first pitch at a Boston Red Sox game.

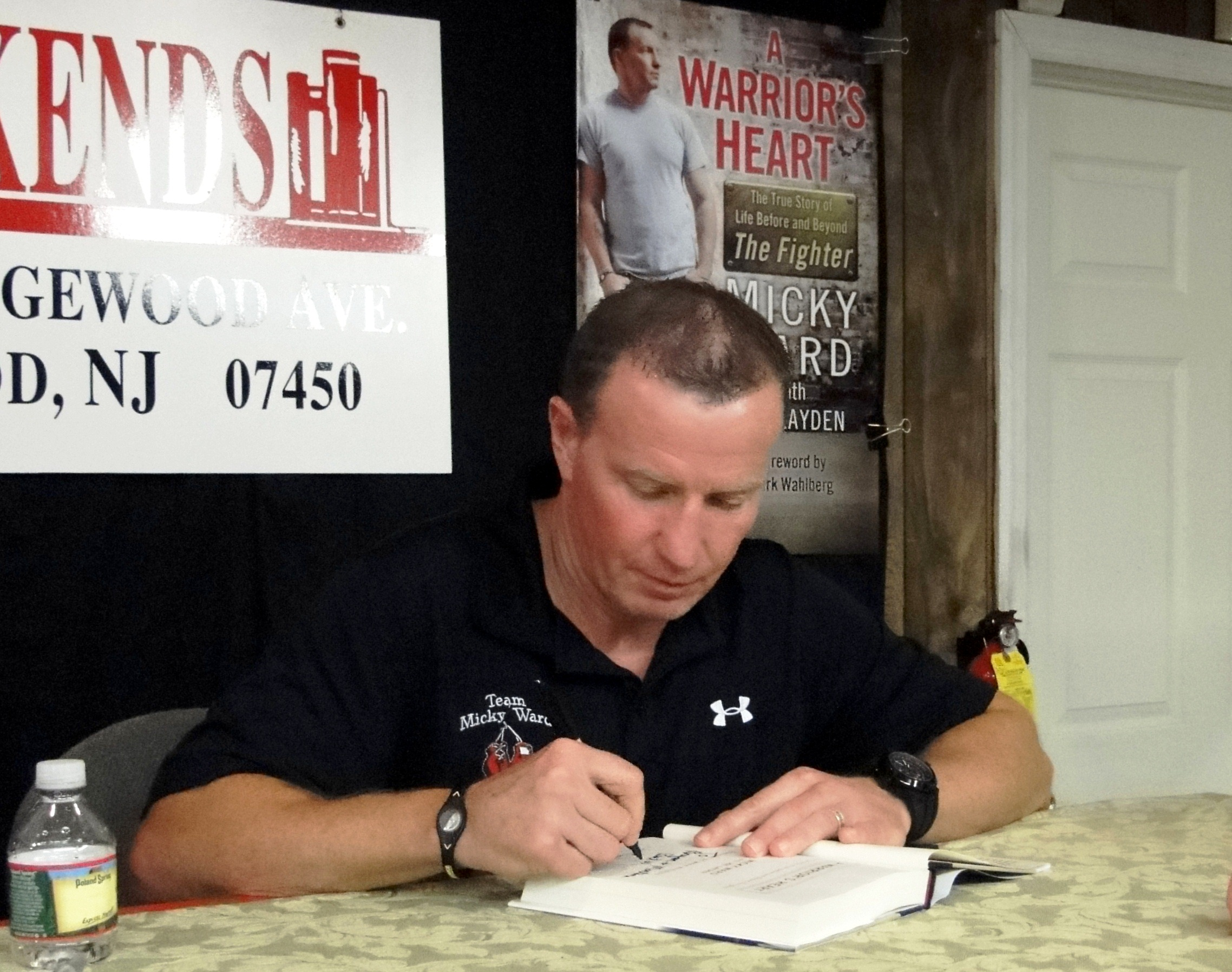
Ward at a book signing in 2012

In 2021, with the help of his nephew, Ward launched his own apparel line named Micky Ward Apparel Co, offering a wide variety of items including gym wear, everyday clothing, and golf accessories.

=== Philanthropy ===
In 2003 and 2006, Ward ran the Boston Marathon to raise money for the charity Kids in Disability Sports (KIDS).

Moved by the impact he was able to make in helping KIDS, he started Team Micky Ward Charities in 2005 to help facilitate similar efforts on a larger and more frequent scale for children in need. The charity provides financial assistance, as well as helping local community and youth. They raise money through events such as Ward's annual golf tournament in June, his fall motorcycle rally, and a 5k called Micky's Run. The charity donates money to local food pantries and gives out a yearly scholarship at Lowell High School. In 2021, Ward's charity gave a $10,000 scholarship and a vacation to a local girl who had recently lost both her mother and grandfather.

Ward also makes numerous one-off appearances at other local charity events to help raise money.

In 2011, Ward guest bartended at a local bar to help raise money for the Muscular Dystrophy Association.

In 2012 Ward and his brother Dicky went to London to be part of a three-day charity event. They shared stories from their career in front of a live audience. The money made from the event went to OneLife UK Charity. The two men also visited local gyms to meet and work out with local underprivileged kids.

In 2013 Ward held a motorcycle rally through Milford to help raise money for the Boston Marathon bombing victims and heroes.

In 2020 Ward's boxing gym hosted an event to help raise money for the charity punch for Parkinson's. His gym also actively sends fighters to local charity fight nights.

== Honors and recognition ==
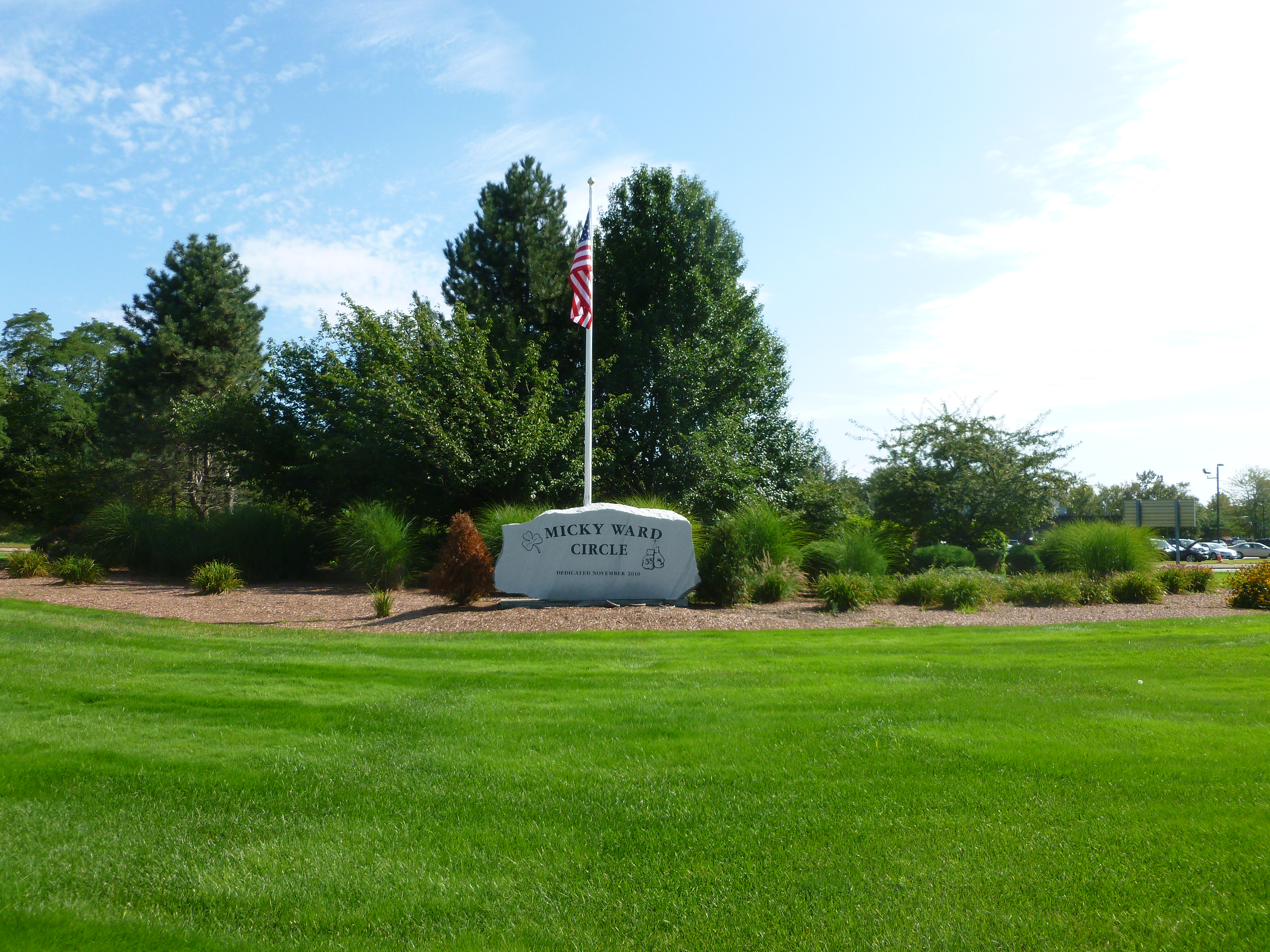
The Micky Ward Traffic Circle in Lowell Massachusetts

In 2002 while training for his second fight Vs Gatti, Ward was awarded the Inaugural Ted Williams Globe & Anchor Award. The honor is given out by the U.S. Marines, to a non-Marine who has shown commitment and dedication to excellence, as well as the hard work and guts.

In November 2010, the city of Lowell built a traffic circle in Wards honor titled the Micky Ward traffic circle.

Ward was awarded the rarely given out James A. Farley Award in 2010, for his lifelong honesty and integrity in the sport of boxing.

In 2005, Ward was given the Contribution to Boxing Award from the Connecticut Boxing Hall of Fame. Ward was later inducted into the Connecticut Boxing Hall of Fame in 2010. He was the first person to be inducted without having any real ties to the state.

Ward was presented with the Boxing Legacy Award at "The Tradition", a yearly event celebrating New England sports. He was also part of The Sports Museum class of 2011 at the TD Garden.

In 2015, Ward was inducted into the New Jersey Boxing Hall of Fame serving as the headliner.

In 2018, Ward was selected as the honorary team captain for team USA, during the USA vs. Ireland Northeast Boxing Tour event in Boston on March 12.

On July 12, 2019, Ward alongside Tony DeMarco were both honored at the first ever boxing event at Encore Boston Harbor. Both being given special awards for their impact on boxing in Massachusetts.

In 2019, Ward was inducted into the Atlantic City Boxing Hall of Fame. Ward headlined the event alongside Bernard Hopkins.

Ward was inducted into the National Boxing Hall of Fame in 2024.

In 2024, Ward served as the honorary Captain for the indoor football team the Massachusetts Pirates during their inaugural game at the Tsongas Center. Ward also got to flip the ceremonial coin toss.

Ward has also been honored by the Irish American community numerous times. He was given the Irish American Hero Award in 2006. He was named to Irish America's top 100 in 2011. In 2016, he has given the John F. Kennedy National Award. Which is given to a Outstanding American of Irish Descent. Most recently he was recognized by the Irish community in his home town of Lowell when he was given The Anam C'ara Award for his work in the local community.

== In popular culture ==
The story of Ward's comeback and rise to fame was made into a 2010 feature film, The Fighter, starring Mark Wahlberg as Ward and Christian Bale as his brother Dicky. Wahlberg was nominated for the Golden Globe for Best Actor. The movie saw critical acclaim, was nominated for several Academy Awards, and won a ESPY for "Best Sports Movie" in 2011. Ward helped train Wahlberg for the role.

Wahlberg confirmed to Spike TV that The Fighter 2 is in the works, which will focus on the legendary fight trilogy between Ward and Arturo Gatti.

New England Patriots coach Bill Belichick gathered his players together to watch the film, joined by Ward, who gave them a motivational speech. Belichick said, "He's a great guy – had a great career and I think it was something the team enjoyed last night."

Lowell hip hop artist D-Tension released the song "One Hit to the Body" which Ward used as his ring entrance music for the May 18, 2002 bout with Gatti.

Philadelphia hip hop group Jedi Mind Tricks released two remixes to their single "Animal Rap" from their third album Visions of Gandhi (2003), dubbed the "Micky Ward Mix" and "Arturo Gatti Mix".

The album The Warrior's Code by Dropkick Murphys features Ward on the cover, and he is the subject of the title song. A live recording of the song is heard in The Fighter. He also makes an appearance in the music video of the bands' song "Going Out in Style". In 2011 the Band brought Ward on stage at their concert at the Tsongas Center and played The Warrior's Code.

Ward's life is chronicled in a biography by Bob Halloran entitled Irish Thunder: The Hard Life and Times of Micky Ward.

In 2013 HBO released an hour long documentary The Tale of Ward and Gatti as a part of their Legendary Nights series. Which highlighted Wards trilogy with Gatti and their friendship.

Ward is credited for helping with the boxing technique and training used for the music video of "Good Vibrations" by Marky Mark and the Funky Bunch.

In 2016, Dennis Taylor and John Raspanti released the book Intimate Warfare, the story of Ward's trilogy of fights with Arturo Gatti and their eventual friendship.

In 2024, during his appearance on Johnny Knoxville's Pretty Sure I Can Fly podcast, Knoxville stated that Ward was one of his favorite boxers, and that he used to watch Ward fight before he went out drinking so that he could get hyped up.

=== Video games ===
The game Fight Night Round 3 (2006) features Ward and Gatti on the cover (PS2 and Xbox versions only).

The boxing game Undisputed features Ward's boxing gym as a playable arena.

Video game appearances
Year	Title	Role
2006	Fight Night Round 3	Playable character
2023	Undisputed	Playable character

== Titles and achievements ==
=== Professional titles ===
- WBU light welterweight champion
- WBU Intercontinental light welterweight champion

=== Amateur titles ===
- New England Golden Gloves champion 1980
- New England Golden Gloves champion 1981
- New England Golden Gloves champion 1982
- New England Junior Olympics champion 1978
- Silver Mittens 90-pound division champion 1980
- New England AAU tournament champion 1983 (139 pound division)
- AAU Lake Placid regional tournament champion 1983 (139 pound division)

=== Fights of the year ===
- The Ring magazine's 2001 Fight of the Year vs Emanuel Augustus
- ESPN 2001 fight of the year vs Emanuel Augustus
- The Ring magazine 2002 fight of the year vs Arturo Gatti I
- The Boxing Writers of America 2002 Fight of the Year vs Arturo Gatti I
- The Ring magazine 2003 fight of the year vs Arturo Gatti III

=== Other boxing awards ===
- The Ring magazine's 2002 Round of the Year vs Arturo Gatti I
- USA Today's 2002 Round of the Year vs Arturo Gatti I
- Connecticut Boxing Hall of Fame Contribution to Boxing Award (2005)
- BWAA James A. Farley Award (2010)
- Connecticut Boxing Hall of Fame (class of 2010)
- The Tradition Boxing Legacy Award (2011)
- New Jersey Boxing Hall of Fame (class of 2015)
- Atlantic City Boxing Hall of Fame (class of 2019)
- National Boxing Hall of Fame (class of 2024)

=== Non-boxing achievements ===
- Inaugural Ted Williams Globe & Anchor Award (2002)
- Irish American Hero Award (2006)
- The Boston Sports Museum's class of (2011)
- Irish America's Top 100 2x (2003, 2011)
- JFK National Award (2016)
- The Anam C'ara Award (2022)

== Fighting style ==
Ward primarily employed an aggressive pressure fighting style, characterized by punching power and a distinct focus on striking the opponent's torso. A core component of his offensive strategy was a left hook directed at the liver, typically preceded by a lighter distraction strike to the head. Ward demonstrated a high level of physical durability, frequently absorbing substantial damage to position himself for a decisive counter strike, a tactic notably employed in his bout against Alfonso Sanchez.

Evaluating Ward's striking efficacy former opponent and undisputed champion Zab Judah stated, "Ward had a body shot that would stop a donkey."

Frequently facing unfavorable betting odds, Ward was recognized for his cardiovascular stamina and exceptional punch resistance. These physical traits facilitated his participation in prolonged, high-volume exchanges of strikes, most prominently documented in his three-bout series with Arturo Gatti.

Tactically, Ward utilized a highly porous guard, favoring a strategy reliant on trading strikes rather than evading them. This methodology contributed significantly to his popularity among general boxing audiences and established his prominence in his hometown of Lowell, Massachusetts.

Commenting on his own tactical approach, Ward acknowledged its inherent risks, stating: "Sometimes it wasn't the smartest thing, That's the only way I know how to do it, is fight. Boxing is a craft of hit and not get hit, With me, it was hit and get hit more."

== Professional boxing record ==
51 fights	38 wins	13 losses
By knockout	27	1
By decision	11	12

No.	Result	Record	Opponent	Type	Round, time	Date	Location	Notes
51	Loss	38–13	Arturo Gatti	UD	10	Jun 7, 2003	Boardwalk Hall, Atlantic City, New Jersey, U.S.	
50	Loss	38–12	Arturo Gatti	UD	10	Nov 23, 2002	Boardwalk Hall, Atlantic City, New Jersey, U.S.	
49	Win	38–11	Arturo Gatti	MD	10	May 18, 2002	Mohegan Sun Arena, Montville, Connecticut, U.S.	
48	Loss	37–11	Jesse James Leija	TD	5 (10), 3:00	Jan 5, 2002	Freeman Coliseum, San Antonio, Texas, U.S.	Split TD after Leija was cut from an accidental head clash
47	Win	37–10	Emanuel Augustus	UD	10	Jul 13, 2001	Casino Ballroom, Hampton Beach, New Hampshire, U.S.	
46	Win	36–10	Steve Quinonez	KO	1 (10), 3:03	May 18, 2001	Foxwoods Resort Casino, Ledyard, Connecticut, U.S.	
45	Loss	35–10	Antonio Díaz	UD	10	Aug 19, 2000	Foxwoods Resort Casino, Ledyard, Connecticut, U.S.	
44	Win	35–9	Shea Neary	TKO	8 (12), 2:55	Mar 11, 2000	London Olympia, London, England	Won WBU light welterweight title
43	Win	34–9	Reggie Green	TKO	10 (10), 2:40	Oct 1, 1999	Icenter, Salem, New Hampshire, U.S.	
42	Win	33–9	Jermal Corbin	RTD	5 (10), 3:00	Jul 16, 1999	Casino Ballroom, Hampton Beach, New Hampshire, U.S.	
41	Win	32–9	Jose Luis Mendez	TKO	3 (8)	Mar 17, 1999	The Roxy, Boston, Massachusetts, U.S.	
40	Loss	31–9	Zab Judah	UD	12	Jun 7, 1998	Miccosukee Resort & Gaming, Miami, Florida, U.S.	For vacant USBA interim light welterweight title
39	Win	31–8	Mark Fernandez	KO	3 (8), 1:57	Apr 14, 1998	Foxwoods Resort Casino, Ledyard, Connecticut, U.S.	
38	Loss	30–8	Vince Phillips	TKO	3 (12), 2:49	Aug 9, 1997	The Roxy, Boston, Massachusetts, U.S.	For IBF light welterweight title
37	Win	30–7	Alfonso Sanchez	KO	7 (10), 1:53	Apr 12, 1997	Thomas & Mack Center, Paradise, Nevada, U.S.	
36	Win	29–7	Manny Castillo	SD	10	Dec 6, 1996	Lawlor Events Center, Reno, Nevada, U.S.	
35	Win	28–7	Louis Veader	UD	12	Jul 28, 1996	Foxwoods Resort Casino, Ledyard, Connecticut, U.S.	Retained WBU Intercontinental light welterweight title
34	Win	27–7	Louis Veader	TKO	9 (12), 1:28	Apr 13, 1996	FleetCenter, Boston, Massachusetts, U.S.	Won WBU Intercontinental light welterweight title
33	Win	26–7	Alex Ortiz	TKO	1 (6)	Mar 15, 1996	Wonderland Greyhound Park, Revere, Massachusetts, U.S.	
32	Win	25–7	Alberto Alicea	TKO	3 (8)	Jan 26, 1996	Wonderland Greyhound Park, Revere, Massachusetts, U.S.	
31	Win	24–7	Edgardo Rosario	TKO	1 (4)	Dec 30, 1995	Wonderland Greyhound Park, Revere, Massachusetts, U.S.	
30	Win	23–7	Genaro Andujar	KO	3 (10)	Sep 10, 1994	Memorial Auditorium, Lowell, Massachusetts, U.S.	
29	Win	22–7	Luis Castillo	TKO	5 (10)	Jun 17, 1994	Sheraton Inn, Lowell, Massachusetts, U.S.	
28	Loss	21–7	Ricky Meyers	UD	10	Oct 15, 1991	Trump Plaza Hotel and Casino, Atlantic City, New Jersey, U.S.	
27	Loss	21–6	Tony Martin	UD	10	May 2, 1991	Etess Arena, Atlantic City, New Jersey, U.S.	
26	Loss	21–5	Charles Murray	UD	12	Oct 18, 1990	Community War Memorial, Rochester, New York, U.S.	For vacant USBA light welterweight title
25	Loss	21–4	Harold Brazier	UD	12	Apr 26, 1990	Resorts International, Atlantic City, New Jersey, U.S.	For IBF Inter-Continental light welterweight title
24	Win	21–3	David Rivello	SD	10	Feb 3, 1990	Hynes Convention Center, Boston, Massachusetts, U.S.	
23	Win	20–3	Clarence Coleman	TKO	5 (10), 2:50	May 23, 1989	Showboat, Atlantic City, New Jersey, U.S.	
22	Loss	19–3	Frankie Warren	UD	12	Jan 15, 1989	Circus Maximus Showroom, Atlantic City, New Jersey, U.S.	For USBA light welterweight title
21	Win	19–2	Francisco Tomas da Cruz	TKO	3 (10), 0:45	Dec 13, 1988	Resorts International, Atlantic City, New Jersey, U.S.	
20	Loss	18–2	Mike Mungin	UD	10	Sep 9, 1988	Resorts International, Atlantic City, New Jersey, U.S.	
19	Win	18–1	Marvin Garris	TKO	2 (10)	Jul 9, 1988	Sands, Atlantic City, New Jersey, U.S.	
18	Win	17–1	David Silva	UD	10	May 19, 1988	Resorts International, Atlantic City, New Jersey, U.S.	
17	Win	16–1	Joey Olivera	UD	10	Feb 19, 1988	Bally's Las Vegas, Paradise, Nevada, U.S.	
16	Win	15–1	Joey Ferrell	TKO	1 (10), 2:36	Jan 15, 1988	Resorts International, Atlantic City, New Jersey, U.S.	
15	Loss	14–1	Edwin Curet	SD	10	Sep 25, 1987	Resorts International, Atlantic City, New Jersey, U.S.	
14	Win	14–0	Derrick McGuire	TKO	4 (8), 2:33	Aug 25, 1987	Bally's Park Place, Atlantic City, New Jersey, U.S.	
13	Win	13–0	Kelly Koble	TKO	4 (8), 3:00	Apr 6, 1987	Caesars Palace, Paradise, Nevada, U.S.	
12	Win	12–0	Hilario Mercedes	SD	8	Feb 24, 1987	Resorts International, Atlantic City, New Jersey, U.S.	
11	Win	11–0	Carlos Brandi	KO	2 (10), 2:55	Oct 24, 1986	Memorial Auditorium, Lowell, Massachusetts, U.S.	
10	Win	10–0	John Rafuse	UD	8	Aug 29, 1986	Memorial Auditorium, Lowell, Massachusetts, U.S.	
9	Win	9–0	Rafael Terrero	TKO	2 (6), 1:12	Jul 4, 1986	Resorts International, Atlantic City, New Jersey, U.S.	
8	Win	8–0	Ken Willis	PTS	6	Jun 15, 1986	Trump Plaza Hotel and Casino, Atlantic City, New Jersey, U.S.	
7	Win	7–0	Luis Pizarro	TKO	3 (6), 2:39	May 30, 1986	Harrah's at Trump Plaza, Atlantic City, New Jersey, U.S.	
6	Win	6–0	Darrell Curtis	TKO	5 (6), 2:05	Apr 18, 1986	Harrah's at Trump Plaza, Atlantic City, New Jersey, U.S.	
5	Win	5–0	Jesus Carlos Velez	KO	6 (6), 2:02	Feb 21, 1986	Harrah's at Trump Plaza, Atlantic City, New Jersey, U.S.	
4	Win	4–0	Mike Peoples	UD	4	Jan 24, 1986	Resorts International, Atlantic City, New Jersey, U.S.	
3	Win	3–0	Chris Bajor	TKO	3 (4), 1:17	Jan 10, 1986	Resorts International, Atlantic City, New Jersey, U.S.	
2	Win	2–0	Greg Young	TKO	4 (4), 1:45	Aug 27, 1985	Memorial Auditorium, Lowell, Massachusetts, U.S.	
1	Win	1–0	David Morin	TKO	1 (4), 1:20	Jun 13, 1985	Roll-On-America Skating Rink, Lawrence, Massachusetts, U.S.	

== Bibliography ==
Non-fiction

- A Warrior's Heart: The True Story of Life Before and Beyond The Fighter (2012)

Sporting positions
Amateur boxing titles
Previous: Unknown	New England Golden Gloves champion (3 times)	Next: Unknown
Regional boxing titles
New title	WBU Intercontinental light welterweight champion April 13, 1996- November 7, 1996; Vacated	Vacant Title next held by Junior Witter
Minor world boxing titles
Preceded by Shea Neary	WBU light welterweight champion March 11, 2000 – October 21, 2000; Vacated	Vacant Title next held by Jason Rowland
Awards
Previous: Erik Morales vs. Marco Antonio Barrera	The Ring Fight of the Year vs. Emanuel Augustus; 2001	Next: Micky Ward vs. Arturo Gatti
Previous: Micky Ward vs. Emanuel Augustus	The Ring Fight of the Year vs. Arturo Gatti; 2002	Next: Micky Ward vs. Arturo Gatti III
Previous: round 10 Bernard Hopkins vs. Félix Trinidad	The Ring Round of the Year round 9 vs. Arturo Gatti; 2002	Next: round 11 Acelino Freitas vs. Jorge Rodrigo Barrios
Previous: Micky Ward vs. Arturo Gatti	The Ring Fight of the Year vs. Arturo Gatti III; 2003	Next: Erik Morales vs. Marco Antonio Barrera III
Inaugural award	BWAA Fight of the Year vs. Arturo Gatti III; 2003	Next: James Toney vs. Vassily Jirov
Previous: Mills Lane	BWAA James A. Farley Award for Honesty and Integrity; 2010	Next: Klitschko brothers
