= Frank Graham (writer) =

American sportswriter (1893–1965)

- Frank Graham in 1948 covering the Army-Navy football game
- Born: November 12, 1893; New York City, US
- Died: March 9, 1965 (aged 71); New York City, US
- Occupation: Sportswriter
- Employer(s): The Sun (1915–1943), New York Journal-American (1945–1965)
- Awards: J. G. Taylor Spink Award (1971); A. J. Liebling Award (1997)

Frank Graham Sr. (November 12, 1893 – March 9, 1965) was an American sportswriter and biographer. He covered sports in New York for The Sun from 1915 to 1943 and for the New York Journal-American from 1945 to 1965. He was also a successful author, writing biographies of politician Al Smith and athletes Lou Gehrig and John McGraw, as well as histories of the New York Yankees, New York Giants and Brooklyn Dodgers. Graham's writing style was notable for his use of lengthy passages of "unrelieved dialogue" in developing portraits of the persons about whom he wrote. Graham was posthumously honored by the Baseball Writers' Association of America with the J. G. Taylor Spink Award in 1971, and by the Boxing Writers Association of America with the A. J. Liebling Award in 1997, the highest award bestowed by each organization.

== Early years ==
Graham was born in 1893 in the East Harlem section of New York City. His mother died during child birth, and he was raised by his grandmother and sister. He contracted spinal meningitis as a boy and lost vision in one eye. He completed only one semester of high school at New York's High School of Commerce. From 1909 to 1915, he worked as an office boy for the New York Telephone Company and developed an interest in boxing. He participated in several amateur boxing matches and wrote articles on boxing for Boxing magazine and the New York World.

== New York Sun ==
In 1915, Graham was hired by the New York newspaper The Sun. He covered the New York Giants' spring training in 1916. While working at The Sun, he became associated with Damon Runyon and Grantland Rice. He remained with The Sun for nearly 30 years. From 1934 to 1943, he wrote a column in The Sun called "Setting the Pace."

== Author ==
In 1943, Graham was hired as the sports editor at Look magazine, a position he held for one year. During the 1940s, Graham also published several books, including biographies of Lou Gehrig ("Lou Gehrig, A Quiet Hero," 1942), John McGraw ("McGraw of the Giants: An Informal Biography," 1944) and former New York Governor and U.S. Presidential candidate Al Smith ("Al Smith, American: An Informal Biography," 1945). He also wrote critically acclaimed team histories of the New York Yankees, New York Giants and Brooklyn Dodgers that remained in print more than 50 years later.

In 1959, Graham published his last book, "Third Man in the Ring," the story of boxing referee Ruby Goldstein as told by Goldstein to Graham.

== New York Journal-American ==
In 1945, Graham was hired by the New York Journal-American. He wrote a column for the Journal-American known as "Graham's Corner" until 1964. Condensed versions of his columns from the Journal-American were regularly featured in Baseball Digest and have fallen into public domain. Links to a number of his better-known columns are set forth below in the "Selected articles written by Graham."

== Reputation and writing style ==
During his career as a sportswriter, Graham was known for his use of conversational dialogue as a device to develop a word portrait of athletes. His use of "unrelieved dialogue" as a writing device was said to be patterned on the work of Ernest Hemingway. In a foreword to a later edition of Graham's history of the Yankees, Leonard Koppett wrote, "He didn't take a lot of notes. He just absorbed what was being said – and what it meant in the right context – and reproduced it in graceful prose and natural speech. It is this style of narration through dialogue that makes his books come so alive."

It was through Graham's use of conversational dialogue that one of baseball's legendary quotes was recorded. Graham reported on a conversation with Leo Durocher during which New York Giants manager Mel Ott and his players walked out of the opposing dugout. Durocher pointed to them and told Graham, "Take a look at them. All nice guys. They'll finish last. Nice guys. Finish last." It was another Durocher conversation recorded by Graham that led to the nickname "Gashouse Gang" for the 1934 St. Louis Cardinals. Graham reported on a conversation between Durocher and Dizzy Dean. When asked if the Cardinals would win the pennant if they played in the American League, Durocher said, "They wouldn't let us in the other league. They would say we are a lot of gashouse ballplayers."

Graham also developed a reputation for kindness and tolerance. His friend, Bob Reilly, described Graham as being "psychopathically polite." Colleague Jimmy Cannon wrote:

"A gentle man who seemed to walk on the tips of his toes as if he intended to pass through the world without disturbing anyone. ... The copy was pure and so was he. He typed it quickly on the toy machine with the dainty tapping of polite fingers. He frisked the characters of even the rogues for their good traits and cherished them for that. He was an original, this embarrassed poet, who changed sports writing, and brought to it the dignity of folk literature."

Sportswriter Arthur Daley wrote that, at a dinner in the 1940s honoring Graham, Grantland Rice had asked the speakers to blast Graham with "words of scathing condemnation." Giants' manager Mel Ott reportedly "stuttered" and "stammered" trying to find words of denunciation for Graham and finally said: "Dammit, Granny. I just can't, I gotta tell the truth. Frank Graham is the nicest, kindest, gentlest, finest, sweetest and most wonderful person I ever met in my life."

Despite his personal reputation as a gentleman, Graham was attracted to the shadowy underworld surrounding sport. In the "Dictionary of Literary Biography," Edward J. Tassinari wrote:

"[M]any of Graham's pieces reflect the New York ambience of the 1920s and the influences of Runyon and Hemingway in terms of characterization, atmosphere, and dialogue. Graham loved the offbeat, shadowy figures and rogues that dwelt on the fringes of his favorite sports – the gamblers, bookies, struggling horse trainers, and injury-riddled jockeys, and fight managers and promoters hustling for a buck or demonstrating the resiliency to continue in search of that elusive big payday."

Quote: "The power of the team blinded onlookers to the skill and smoothness of its fielding. Enemy teams cracked and broke wide open before their assaults."—Frank Graham on the 1927 Yankees.

== Later years and family ==
Graham developed cancer in 1960. When Graham appeared at the Waldorf-Astoria Hotel in 1961 to accept a lifetime achievement award from the New York chapter of the Baseball Writers' Association of America, a UPI reporter covering the event wrote: "[T]he crowd rose to its feet in acknowledgement of one of the top writers in the country. And there weren't many dry eyes among them."

Graham's last column in the Journal-American was published in December 1964. In January 1965, Graham fell at his home in New Rochelle, New York, fracturing his skull. He died several days later at Nathan B. Etten Hospital in The Bronx.

Graham was married to Gertrude Lillian Whipp in 1923. They had four children. In 1981, Graham's son, Frank Graham Jr., wrote a dual biography of himself and his father titled "A Farewell To Heroes."

== Awards and honors ==
Graham was the recipient of numerous honors and awards for his writing. These include the following:

- In 1957, the Boxing Writers Association of New York presented Graham with the James J. Walker Award for "long and meritorious" service to boxing.
- In 1958, Graham received the Grantland Rice Award, presented each year to the outstanding sportswriter in the United States.
- In 1961, he received the William J. Slocum Award for "long and meritorious service" to baseball.
- In 1971, he was posthumously honored by the Baseball Writers' Association of America with its highest honor, the J. G. Taylor Spink Award for distinguished baseball writing. As a recipient of the award, later renamed the BBWAA Career Excellence Award, Graham was posthumously added to the "writers wing" of the National Baseball Hall of Fame and Museum in 1972.
- In 1997, Graham was posthumously honored by the Boxing Writers Association of America with the A. J. Liebling Award for outstanding writing about boxing.

== Works ==
- Lou Gehrig: a quiet hero. G.P. Putnam's Sons. 1942.
- "The New York Yankees: An Informal History" (1943, G.P. Putnam's Sons)
- McGraw Of The Giants: An Informal Biography. G. P. Putnam's Sons. 1944.
- "The Brooklyn Dodgers: An Informal History" (1945, G.P. Putnam's Sons)
- "Al Smith, American: An Informal Biography" (1945, G.P. Putnam's Sons)
- "Baseball Wit and Wisdom: Folklore of a National Pastime" (with Dick Hyman) (1952)
- "The New York Giants: An Informal History of a Great Baseball Club" (1952, G.P. Putnam's Sons)
- "Third Man in the Ring," (with Ruby Goldstein) (1959, Funk & Wagnalls)
