= John F.X. Condon =

American PA announcer and boxing promoter (1914–1989)

- Born: John Francis Xavier Condon; August 29, 1914; Manhattan, New York City, New York, U.S.
- Died: October 13, 1989 (aged 75); Manhattan, New York City, New York, U.S.
- Education: Fordham University
- Occupation: Public address announcer

John F.X. Condon (August 29, 1914 – October 13, 1989) was an American public address announcer and boxing publicist best known for many years as the voice of Madison Square Garden.

== Early life and education ==
John Francis Xavier Condon was born August 29, 1914, in Manhattan, New York City, New York, United States.

Condon attended Fordham University in New York City.

== Career ==
In 1947, at a New York Knicks versus Boston Celtics game at Madison Square Garden, Condon was invited to audition for the public address role. He got the job, and began his role in the announcer's seat, one year after the establishment of the Knicks in the National Basketball Association. For 42 seasons, he was the public address announcer at Madison Square Garden for the New York Knicks. He was known for his signature greeting, "Good evening, everybody. Welcome to Madison Square Garden," and announcing starting lineups at Knicks and college basketball games.

Condon's sports publicity business, which operated until 1960, represented esteemed clients such as New York Athletic Club, Iona College, Adelphi College, and the U.S. Merchant Marine Academy.

Beginning in 1960, he served as the director of publicity for Madison Square Garden Boxing, Inc. and promoted major events, notably the 1971 Fight of the Century. His creative publicist work brought significant attention to bouts held at Madison Square Garden. As publicist for the 1962 Cassius Clay vs. Sonny Banks bout, Condon developed an early rapport with Muhammad Ali, impressed by his willingness to help promote the bout.

In 1965, the Garden press agent was responsible for staging the retirement farewell of Hall of Famer Sugar Ray Robinson at Madison Square Garden. That year, he hired photographer George Kalinsky to take pre-publicity photos of championship fighters like Emile Griffith and Dick Tiger.

Condon personally notified Muhammad Ali of his Vietnam War draft status on March 15, 1967, shortly before his proposed fight with Ernie Terrell.

In a publicity stunt for the Garden's Frazier–Quarry fight, he set up a ring and band in Times Square, drawing 4,000 spectators and broad media attention.

While he announced countless Knicks playoff games, his iconic moment came in Game 7 of the 1970 NBA Finals on May 8. Despite a torn muscle, NBA legend Willis Reed entered to cheers, and Condon introduced him with, "At center. Number 19. Captain. Willis Reed." The crowd roared for 28 seconds before Condon continued with the next starter.

By 1973, John Condon held the position of vice president of Madison Square Garden Boxing, Inc. He was also appointed Vice President of Public Relations and Promotion for the Madison Square Garden Corporation from 1978 to 1981.

On March 29, 1979, Condon addressed the 96th Congress subcommittee on labor standards concerning the Federal Boxing Control Act and a national boxing board.

Condon became the head of the boxing department at Madison Square Garden in 1979. By then, he had helped promote and present hundreds of boxing matches featuring Muhammad Ali, Joe Frazier, Roberto Duran, Floyd Patterson, Emile Griffith, "Sugar Ray" Robinson, and Gene Fullmer.

As the Garden's president for boxing, Condon organized the Kid Gloves Amateur Boxing Tournament that launched Mark Breland and Buddy McGirt as world champions. Sponsored by the New York chapter of the Metropolitan Amateur Boxing Federation and Madison Square Garden, the 11-bout tournament was created to give kids a chance to practice boxing in a safe and supervised setting.

Condon served as a matchmaker and commentator for fights broadcast on the Madison Square Garden Network for a while. The department head did the color commentary for the 1985 Mike Tyson vs. Sammy Scaff bout hosted in the Felt Forum at the Garden.

Condon cameoed as himself in the 1984 music video of Kurtis Blow's "Basketball".

He was succeeded by Mike Walczewski as the Knicks public address announcer in 1989, who has continued in this role to this day.

== Death ==
John F.X. Condon died at 75 years old on October 13, 1989, at Lenox Hill Hospital in Manhattan.

== Legacy ==
Condon was recognized with the James J. Walker Award (now the Barney Nagler Award) by the Boxing Writers Association of America in 1968 and, in 1984, received both the Sam Taub Award and James A. Farley Award.

He was inducted as a member of the New Jersey Boxing Hall of Fame on November 15, 1985.

Following his death, his legacy was celebrated at the season opener of the 1989–90 New York Knicks season.

The Futch–Condon Award, awarded by the Boxing Writers Association of America, was named after him and boxing trainer Eddie Futch.

Condon was inducted into the International Boxing Hall of Fame with the class of 2015.
