= Jack Mosley =

American boxing coach

Jack Mosley is an American boxing coach and manager, from United States and the father of World Champion Shane Mosley. He was selected to receive the Futch–Condon Award for the 1998 Trainer of the Year by the Boxing Writers Association of America (BWAA).
