= BWAA =

BWAA may refer to:

- Baseball Writers' Association of America (BBWAA)
- Bowling Writers Association of America
- Boxing Writers Association of America
- British Wheelchair Athletics Association
