= Herb Dean =

Mixed martial arts referee

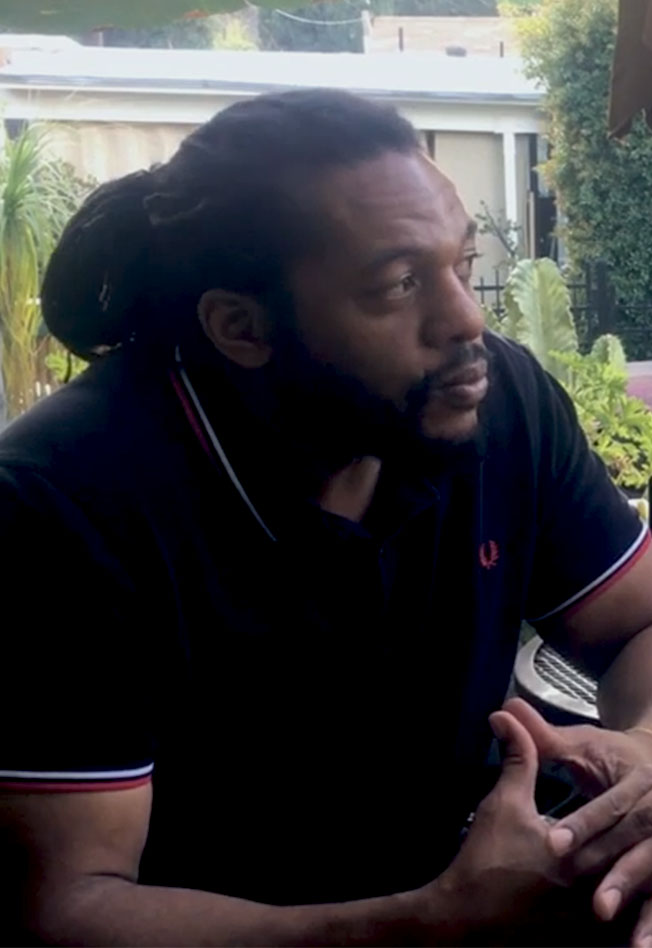
- Dean in 2019
- Born: September 30, 1970 (age 56); Pasadena, California, U.S.
- Height: 6 ft 1 in (185 cm)
- Weight: 220 lb (100 kg; 15 st 10 lb)
- Division: Heavyweight (265 lb)
- Fighting out of: Los Angeles, California, U.S.
- Team: Submission Factory
- Years active: 2001–2007 (MMA)

Mixed martial arts record
- Total: 5
- Wins: 2
- By knockout: 1
- By submission: 1
- Losses: 3
- By knockout: 1
- By submission: 2

Other information
- Mixed martial arts record from Sherdog

Herb Dean (born September 30, 1970) is an American professional mixed martial arts referee and former mixed martial artist. Dean has worked events put on by the Ultimate Fighting Championship and ONE Championship promotions, among others. He is frequently called the gold standard for referees in MMA.

== UFC and notable matches ==
At UFC 48, held on June 19, 2004, Dean refereed a bout between Tim Sylvia and Frank Mir for the vacant UFC Heavyweight Championship. At 50 seconds of round one, Dean called a stop to the fight when he saw Sylvia's right forearm break due to an armbar. Due to the close proximity of a UFC cameraman, in the video footage a shocked Dean can be heard shouting "Oh, shit!" when he saw the break, and he immediately moved in to stop the fight. This proved difficult, because Sylvia, who was still trying to defend the armbar, argued with him for several seconds, despite Dean's telling him "Stop, stop, stop! The fight is over!" Once freed from the armbar, Sylvia again began to argue with Dean, who continually told him, "It's fucking broken! Your arm is broken." Sylvia protested, claiming his arm was perfectly fine and even moving it around with no apparent problems. Dean, however, insisted that "I heard it snap. I saw it go." Ringside physician Dr. Margaret Goodman agreed with Dean's assessment, and the fight was not restarted. In the post-fight interview, Sylvia again denied that his arm was broken, however the slow-motion replay showed the break happening, and an X-ray that evening showed significant damage to Sylvia's arm, which required surgery and a long recovery. Sylvia later admitted that he knew his arm was broken and wanted to keep fighting in spite of that, but he thanked Dean for saving his career by ending the fight when he did.

At UFC 61, held on July 8, 2006, Dean served as referee of the highly anticipated rematch between Tito Ortiz and Ken Shamrock. At 1:18 into the first round, Dean stepped in and stopped the fight following several consecutive unanswered elbows to the head of Shamrock by Ortiz, giving the victory to Ortiz by TKO. Shamrock, visibly angered, immediately protested the decision. However, it was not overturned and Shamrock was subsequently ushered out of the Octagon. A rematch was held during Ortiz vs. Shamrock 3: The Final Chapter with Ortiz once again claiming victory in a very similar fashion to the second fight, although Shamrock did not question this decision.

At UFC 70, held on April 21, 2007, Dean was the referee during the bout between Mirko Cro Cop and Gabriel Gonzaga. Late in the first round, Dean stood the fight up from the guard position, a measure typically used against inactivity. Some fight analysts claim that Gonzaga was in fact administering ground and pound and had just maneuvered his opponent against the cage for an additional advantage. Shortly after the stand up, Gonzaga knocked out Filipović with a kick to the head. Filipović collapsed awkwardly after receiving the blow, pinning his right foot, which was rotated 180 degrees backwards, underneath his body. Dean quickly freed the pinned foot which helped prevent serious injury. Filipović has stated since that the elbows on the ground confused and damaged him enough that he was disoriented after the stand up, contributing to the subsequent knockout.

UFC president Dana White stated after UFC 109 and UFC 160, that he thinks Dean "is one of the best referees in this business. Actually, I think he's the best" in reference to his stoppage in the fight between Mike Swick and Paulo Thiago. He added that after Dean's stoppage of the Mir vs. Sylvia fight he never questions Dean. "When Herb Dean does shit, I don't even question it anymore. I wait for the replay. This guy sees shit that I can't see sitting there watching the monitor." At UFC 169, Dean caused controversy over his stoppage of the main card fight Renan Barão vs. Urijah Faber for the UFC bantamweight title. UFC president Dana White criticized Dean saying, "He made a mistake."

At UFC Fight Night: Hunt vs. Oleinik, Dean was heavily criticized for a late stoppage during his refereeing of a fight between Khalid Murtazaliev and C. B. Dollaway. Many fans took to Twitter afterwards, with near universal criticism towards the stoppage, comparing it to a recent late stoppage by fellow referee Mario Yamasaki.

At UFC 235, Dean was criticized by UFC president Dana White after he awarded a win to Ben Askren via bulldog choke against Robbie Lawler after he thought Lawler had lost consciousness.

At UFC on ESPN: Whittaker vs. Till, Dean received more criticism for his late stoppage of a fight between Francisco Trinaldo and Jai Herbert, and got into an altercation with UFC commentator and former fighter Dan Hardy over the stoppage.

At UFC 229, held on October 6, 2018, Dean refereed what is considered to be one of the most anticipated fights of all time, Khabib Nurmagomedov vs Conor McGregor. A post fight video emerged where Dean was conversing with Nurmagomedov regarding the illegal moves by McGregor not called during the match.

At UFC Freedom 250, Dean refereed the bout between Josh Hokit and Derrick Lewis, as well as the interim heavyweight championship fight between Alex Pereira and Ciryl Gane. Dean ruled the latter fight a TKO loss for Pereira in the second round. In the days after the event, Pereira argued that Gane landed several illegal strikes to the back of the head after dropping him with a legal punch, and criticized Dean for his perceived failure to intervene. Pereira claimed he spoke to Dean before the fight about the possibility of Gane committing illegal strikes, and called for Dean to "be punished" and face "legal consequences."

At UFC Fight Night: Fiziev vs. Torres, Dean refereed a bout between Shara Magomedov and Michel Pereira. In the first round, Magomedov illegally pulled Pereira's hair on two separate occasions while Pereira was in a dominant position, and while Magomedov received multiple warnings, no point was deducted. Magomedov was also not deducted a point for an eye poke later in the fight. If any point had been deducted the fight would have likely been scored a draw, as Magomedov won a 29-28 decision on all judge's scorecards. Pereira complained about Dean's refereeing, calling the result of the fight "compromised" and sharing a petition to ban Dean from officiating UFC fight. Michel Pereira was later released from the organization after his contract was not renewed. Alex Pereira publicly called Dean a "coward" in the initial aftermath of the fight, and later blamed Dean for Pereira's release.

== Awards ==
Dean has won Fighters Only Magazine's World MMA Awards Referee of the Year in 2010, 2011, 2012, 2013, 2014, 2018, 2019 (–July 2020), (July 2020–) 2021, 2023 and 2024. Dean, however, missed out on the award in 2015 to ”Big” John McCarthy for the first time since the category was introduced.

== Mixed martial arts record ==
Professional record breakdown
5 matches	2 wins	3 losses
By knockout	1	2
By submission	1	1

Res.	Record	Opponent	Method	Event	Date	Round	Time	Location	Notes
Loss	2–3	Dave Legeno	TKO (eye injury)	Cage Rage 22: Hard as Hell	July 14, 2007	1	5:00	London, England	
Loss	2–2	Choi Jung-gyu	Submission (keylock)	Spirit MC 9: Welterweight GP Opening	October 8, 2006	2	3:51	Seoul, South Korea	
Win	2–1	Timothy Mendoza	TKO (knee and punches)	KOTC 39: Hitmaster	August 6, 2004	2	3:31	San Jacinto, California, United States	
Loss	1–1	Joe Riggs	TKO (submission to punches)	Rage in the Cage 43: The Match	January 18, 2003	1	0:52	Phoenix, Arizona, United States	
Win	1–0	Randy Halmot	Submission (choke)	Gladiator Challenge 6	September 9, 2001	1	0:43	Colusa, California, United States	

== In other media ==
Dean has been featured as a referee in EA Sports UFC series. By EA Sports UFC 5, Dean was the sole referee for all bouts in the game.

== See also ==
- List of male mixed martial artists
