= Anatoly Lomachenko =

Ukrainian boxing trainer (born 1964)

Anatoly Lomachenko (born 14 December 1964) is a Ukrainian boxing trainer. He is the father of three-division boxing champion Vasiliy Lomachenko. He was selected to receive the Futch–Condon Award for the 2017 Trainer of the Year by the Boxing Writers Association of America (BWAA) and 2018 by the Ring magazine.

He also trained Oleksandr Usyk from 2017, taking over from James Ali Bashir.
