= Chick Wergeles =

American sports promoter and boxing manager (1893-1972)

- Born: Charles Wergeles; May 15, 1893; New York, U.S.
- Died: April 15, 1972 (aged 78); Yonkers, New York
- Other names: "Chick" "Hercules"
- Occupations: Sports promoter, boxing manager

Chick Wergeles (May 15, 1893 – April 15, 1972) was an American sports promoter and boxing manager who managed Beau Jack and Rocky Marciano.

== Early life ==
Charles Wergeles was born on May 15, 1893. His early years were spent as a Jewish child in an Irish section of the Lower East Side.

Early on, he dropped out of elementary school. By the age of 15, Chick had learned the printing trade and supplemented his income by bringing young fighters to the Longacre Athletic Club on 29th Street, earning a portion of their $5 purse through the club's promoter.

== Career ==
In 1907, at age 16, he began promoting fights in Brooklyn.

Beyond his managerial role, Wergeles impressed promoters with his ability to secure newspaper features for his boxers by offering inside stories on the fight game in exchange for space. As the years went by, this allowed him to develop personal connections with leading New York sports page figures like Bill Corum, Paul Gallico, Dan Parker, Grantland Rice, Wilbur Wood, Joe Williams, and others.

Known for his advance work, Chick publicized many sports including boxing, wrestling, football, basketball, horse racing, golf, and skating. He got his start with Tim Mara in football, Ned Irish in basketball, Mike Jacobs in boxing, and George Morton Levy in harness racing.

Under Tim Mara, Wergeles served as the first public relations director of the New York Giants football team in 1924. Paid $70 by Mara, he promoted Sunday home games at the Polo Grounds. He was with the professional football franchise when Ned Irish was first hired for one of the sports team's public relations positions. When Wergeles asked Irish how he had done after the meeting, he remarked, "I not only got the job, but I'm your boss now."

When C. C. Pyle established the New York Yankees in 1926, he asked Wergeles to promote the new football team.

Wergeles began managing the Goodall Round Robin in 1939 and was retained for the 1940 and 1941 events. It was through his golf connections that Wergeles encountered a future world champion boxing prospect.

He started working on the original publicity staff of the Roosevelt Raceway when the race track first opened in 1940.

Sent to Massachusetts by New York Herald Tribune executive William E. Robinson, sportswriter Richards Vidmer took Chick Wergeles along to check out Beau Jack. Beau Jack was a former shoeshine boy at Augusta National Golf Club. Wergeles was soon connected with Bowman Milligan, Beau's guardian and steward of the Augusta National clubhouse. He wanted to manage and arrange a fight in New York for Jack. Chick Wergeles used the story of the Twenty Millionaires Club to build hype, though it was actually 23 Augusta National members including Bobby Jones who pitched in $25 each to support Jack's career. The first New York fight was set up against Minnie Demore at Ebbets Field. Chick Wergeles arranged Beau Jack's swift return to Ebbets—within two weeks of his knockout of DeMore—after receiving more than 90 local fan requests. In just 18 months, Wergeles guided Beau Jack from his August 1941 debut in New York to a world lightweight title fight against Tippy Larkin at Madison Square Garden. Under their arrangement, Chick split each fight purse from Mike Jacobs, sending half to a trust for Beau Jack in Atlanta and placing his own share—after expenses—into another trust, giving Beau $5 spending money after every fight. By late 1942, Wergeles had paid back the Augusta National syndicate, and Beau Jack had $10,000 secured in a trust fund.

He maintained his positions promoting pro football and basketball. Wergeles entered his eighth season alongside Ned Irish in 1942, the man behind the New York Knicks and Madison Square Garden basketball. He also reached his 18th season with Mara's Giants that year.

Chick Wergeles' management career paused in 1944 when the Second World War kept Beau Jack out of the ring for more than a year.

Chick became assistant manager to Rocky Marciano around 1952 after Al Weill brought him in. Wergeles owned a 10% interest in Marciano. He was brought in to smooth over Weill's relations with the nation's sportswriters. Representing Marciano in October 1951, Chick Wergeles and Weil finalized a $250,000 agreement with Toots Mondt for refereeing, sparring, and appearances booked by the Manhattan Booking Agency president. When Marciano fought Jersey Joe Walcott, he earned $900,000 and Wergeles received a cut of $90,000.

Another of Chick Wergeles' fighters was Tommy Bell, a former world welterweight title challenger. Wergeles called padded headgear a great innovation when it appeared in the early 1950s, but that praise faded after Gene Smith knocked out his fighter Tommy Bell.

For nearly a decade, from 1942 to 1951, Chick Wergeles managed Beau Jack’s boxing career. Following Beau Jack's May 1951 loss to Gil Turner, he recommended retirement for his fighter, whose contract ran out on October 14. In early 1955, Wergeles made an attempt to prevent a retired Beau Jack from fighting again, pointing to a contract signed in 1952 after news broke of a comeback fight planned with Eddie Green in Columbia, South Carolina.

In the 1960s, he had spent years as the advance man for the Harlem Globetrotters under Abe Saperstein.

Working until his death in the early 1970s, Chick Wergeles managed publicity for both the Roosevelt Raceway and Yonkers Raceway, the area's harness racing tracks.

== Personal life ==
Chick Wergeles' family included three sons—James, Edward, and Charles—and three daughters—Ruth, Murial, and Bernice. Two of Chick Wergeles' sons served in the Second World War: Sgt. Eddie Wergeles, a photographer for the U.S. Signal Corps who later became a photojournalist for Newsweek, and PFC James "Jimmy" Wergeles, a fighting Marine who later entered public relations like his father.

== Death ==
Charles "Chick" Wergeles died on April 15, 1972, at St. John's Hospital in Yonkers, New York, United States.
