= Futch–Condon Award =

American boxing award

- Sport: Boxing
- Awarded for: "Trainer of the Year"
- Country: U.S.
- Presented by: Boxing Writers Association of America

History
- First award: 1989

The Eddie Futch-John F.X. Condon Award, commonly referred to as the Futch–Condon Award and known alternatively as the Boxing Writers Association of America Trainer of the Year Award, has been conferred annually since 1989 by the Boxing Writers Association of America on the trainer, irrespective of nationality or gender, adjudged by the membership of the Association to have been the best in boxing in a given year.

Named for Eddie Futch, a Detroit, Michigan-based trainer who helped Don Jordan to the world welterweight championship in 1958 and also trained or co-trained world champions Ken Norton, Joe Frazier, Larry Holmes, Michael Spinks, and Riddick Bowe, and for John F.X. Condon, for 42 years the public address announcer at Madison Square Garden and the winner of the 1984 Sam Taub Award, given by the International Boxing Hall of Fame for career "excellence in broadcasting journalism", the award is presented with other honors given by the BWAA at an annual awards dinner held in the spring of the year following that for performance in which the award is given.

== List of winners ==
| Year | Trainer | Nation |
|---|---|---|
| 1989 | George Benton | United States |
| 1990 | George Benton (2) | United States |
| 1991 | Eddie Futch | United States |
| 1992 | Eddie Futch (2) | United States |
| 1993 | Emanuel Steward | United States |
| 1994 | Teddy Atlas | United States |
| 1995 | Felix Trinidad Sr. | Puerto Rico |
| 1996 | Don Turner | United States |
| 1997 | Emanuel Steward (2) | United States |
| 1998 | Jack Mosley | United States |
| 1999 | Miguel Diaz | Argentina |
| 2000 | Felix Trinidad Sr. (2) | Puerto Rico |
| 2001 | English "Bouie" Fisher | United States |
| 2002 | Buddy McGirt | United States |
| 2003 | Freddie Roach | United States |
| 2004 | Dan Birmingham | United States |
| 2005 | Dan Birmingham (2) | United States |
| 2006 | Freddie Roach (2) | United States |
| 2007 | Enzo Calzaghe | United Kingdom |
| 2008 | Freddie Roach (3) | United States |
| 2009 | Freddie Roach (4) | United States |
| 2010 | Freddie Roach (5) | United States |
| 2011 | Virgil Hunter | United States |
| 2012 | Robert Garcia | United States |
| 2013 | Freddie Roach (6) | United States |
| 2014 | Freddie Roach (7) | United States |
| 2015 | Abel Sanchez | Mexico |
| 2016 | Shane McGuigan | United Kingdom |
| 2017 | Anatoly Lomachenko | Ukraine |
| 2018 | Anatoly Lomachenko (2) | Ukraine |
| 2019 | Eddy Reynoso | Mexico |
| 2020 | Teófimo López, Sr. | Honduras |
| 2021 | Eddy Reynoso (2) | Mexico |
| 2022 | Derrick James | United States |
| 2023 | Brian McIntyre | United States |

== See also ==
- Al Buck Award, conferred by the BWAA on the manager adjudged to be the best in boxing in a given year
- The Ring annual awards
