= Hank Kaplan =

American boxing historian (1920–2007)

- Born: April 15, 1919; Brooklyn, New York, USA
- Died: December 14, 2007 (aged 88); Kendall, Florida
- Resting place: Mount Nebo Cemetery, West Miami, Florida
- Education: Degree in Biology
- Alma mater: University of Miami
- Occupation(s): Boxing historian, writer
- Years active: 1950s – 2007
- Spouse: Sylvia Kaplan
- Children: Barbara Kaplan Haar; Dr. Steven Kaplan

Hank Kaplan (April 15, 1920 – December 14, 2007) was an American boxing historian and writer. Always wearing one of many of his prized boxing baseball caps, and smoking a pipe, he is widely regarded as the nation's foremost boxing historian, and was known and respected worldwide. Kaplan was known to possess the largest collection of boxing memorabilia, consisting of millions of pieces including newspaper articles, books, and photographs, stemming back from the 19th century. His expertise in boxing history helped him earn the nickname "Lord of the Ring."

== Childhood and family life ==
Kaplan was born in Brooklyn, New York, to Jewish immigrant parents from Lithuania. He had three siblings. His father died of tuberculosis, when Kaplan was only 9 years of age, leaving his mother to raise four children on her own. His mother struggled to make ends meet as a seamstress, but was forced to place the children in an orphanage at a young age. Hank Kaplan spent much of his early years growing up in the Hebrew Orphan Asylum of New York (HOA), also known as the Academy. He was an active member of HOA and participated in annual events throughout his entire lifetime. Kaplan and his siblings later moved back with their mother during his early teenage years, and she supported the children by working as a seamstress. She owned a business designing and sewing wedding gowns.

Kaplan became interested in boxing beginning from his early years in Brooklyn, after he suffered a bloody nose in his childhood from a fight with another smaller child at Camp Wakitan in upstate New York. He had his first and only professional boxing fight as an adolescent in Bridgeport, Connecticut in the early 1940s, which he won.

== Military career ==
Kaplan joined the U.S. Coast Guard in his early 20s, and served during World War II, as he wanted to follow in the footsteps of his idol at the time, Jack Dempsey. He spent time in the Coast Guard disinfecting ships, after learning skills about chemical warfare and how to prevent the spread of contamination. He was later assigned to work for the U.S. Department of Public Health. He attended the University of Miami at night, while he continued to work during the day, inspecting ships for any signs of infectious contamination. Following this, he worked for the Centers for Disease Control and Prevention, where he, along with 4 other scientists, went to Indonesia where they spent nine weeks in attempt to battle a severe outbreak of Bubonic Plague. Kaplan worked for the CDC until retirement, at age 55.

== Career ==
Kaplan moved to Miami as a young adolescent, where he married his first wife. They had two children, twins, but divorced shortly after. His interest in boxing grew while living in Miami. He spent many hours at the Fifth Street Gym in Miami Beach, where he first met Cassius Clay (later to be known as Muhammad Ali). Kaplan spent many hours at the Fifth Street Gym, with many of boxing's greatest legends from the 1950s. It was here that he met the Dundee brothers, Chris and Angelo. Kaplan later became the publicist for the Dundee brothers' fighters, who included Muhammad Ali. For a short period of time, he co-promoted fights with Ramiro Ortiz, however, his passion for boxing history took over his love for promoting.

Kaplan was the founder and editor of Boxing Digest and served as a boxing consultant to various media outlets for many years, including ESPN, HBO and Showtime. He also wrote for The Ring magazine. He received the James J. Walker Award for long and meritorious service to boxing from the Boxing Writers Association of America in 2002. In 2006 he was elected to the International Boxing Hall of Fame. Many professional boxers had wished to nominate Kaplan for the Hall of Fame for years on end, however, since Hank served on the Hall of Fame Nominating Committee, they were unable to nominate him. As was typical, anyone who was worthy of a nomination would typically voluntarily step down from the Nominating Committee in order to accept the nomination. Kaplan, however, refused to do so for years, stating he wanted to see others nominated before him. After much pressure, Kaplan agreed and was inducted in 2006 into the International Boxing Hall of Fame.

== Legacy ==
Kaplan married Sylvia in Florida, whom he was married to for 56 years, until her death. They had two children together. His wife was known to invite many boxers into their home, often cooking for them and assisting them with any needs. He never sold any of his pieces of boxing history, despite their monetary value. He was quoted as saying "None of this is for my own glory. I have no dreams of great rewards. My love of boxing comes first." Upon his death, he donated his entire boxing archives to Brooklyn College in New York.

Kaplan died on the morning of December 14, 2007 at his home in Kendall, Florida, after a brief battle with cancer. He was survived by two daughters and a son, his brother, his sister, and four grandchildren.
