= Sam Taub =

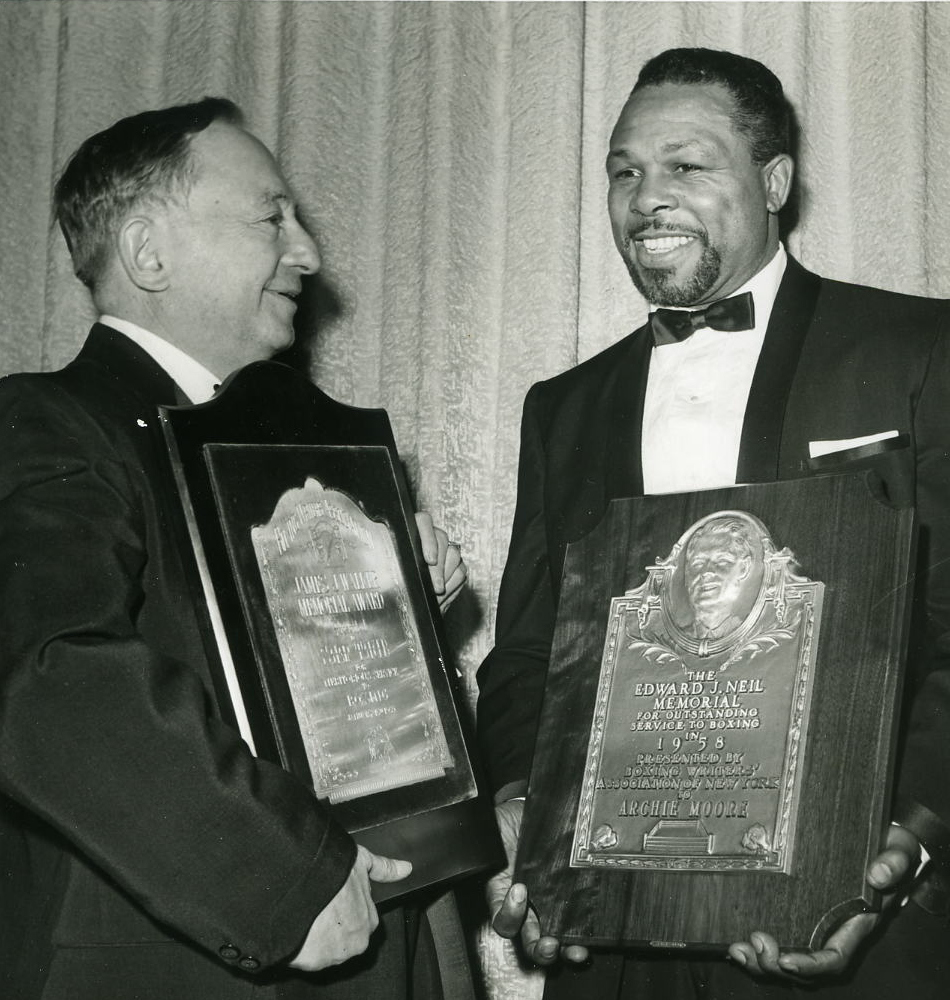
Sam Taub and Archie Moore in 1959

Sam Taub (September 10, 1886 – July 10, 1979) was a journalist and radio broadcaster who is best known for his work covering boxing.

Taub was Jewish, and was born on New York's Lower East Side and raised on Mott Street in Chinatown. He attended PS8 on Mott Street, and learned to type at night school at DeWitt Clinton High School. Typing let him to his first job as stenographer and typist for the Morning Telegraph. At that paper, Bat Masterson made Taub his assistant. Masterson died at the paper's offices in Taub's arms; Taub succeeded him as sports editor.

In 1924, Taub began his career as a radio boxing announcer. In 1939, he became the first person to announce a major fight for television when he called the Lou Nova-Max Baer bout. He also had a radio show called The Hour of Champions which ran for twenty-four years on WHN in New York.

Taub also worked as a boxing journalist. His contributions were featured in The Ring from the 1920s until his death in the 1970s, in a column called "Up And Down Old Broadway". He was a charter member of the Boxing Writers Association founded in 1925.

Among the awards Taub received was the James J. Walker Award (now the Barney Nagler Award) for "Long and Meritorious Service to Boxing" from the Boxing Writers Association of America. That same organization created the "Sam Taub Award" for excellence in broadcasting journalism in 1978. He is an inductee of the International Boxing Hall of Fame. Taub received the Pillar of Achievement from the International Jewish Sports Hall of Fame.
