= Emil Lence =

American boxing promoter (1916–1993)

- Born: Emil Lence; November 23, 1916; Brooklyn, New York, U.S.
- Died: June 16, 1993 (aged 76); Delray Beach, Florida, U.S.
- Occupations: Dressmaker; Boxing promoter
- Years active: 1947-1957
- Children: 2

Emil Lence (November 23, 1916 – June 16, 1993) was an American businessman and boxing promoter active in New York, where he operated the Eastern Parkway Arena.

== Early life and education ==
Emil Lence was born on November 23, 1916, in Brooklyn, New York, United States. His upbringing took place in the Williamsburg area of Brooklyn, and he attended junior high school in the neighborhood.

His last name, Lence, was Italian and pronounced "Len-chay."

His father, John Lence, headed the family dressmaking business. Emil pursued studies in dress designing at Stuyvesant High School and accounting at Eastern District High School, but his primary interest lay in joining his father's business.

== Career ==
Early on, he produced dresses for the Junior Miss pageants. The Lence family, long involved in dressmaking in Brooklyn, diversified into the roller skating industry. During World War II, he and his father purchased the Eastern Parkway Arena, initially running it as a roller skating rink from 1945 until 1947.

Boxer Jack Dempsey and Dave Soden, a Brooklyn public official, convinced them to convert the rink into a boxing venue. He soon leveraged the roller skating rink investment to build a career in boxing promotion. He began promoting boxing in December 1947, at the end of World War II, during the post-war boxing boom in the New York metropolitan area.

He entered television through a contract with WPIX one year later, before taking his broadcasts to the DuMont Television Network in 1949, where they continued until May 1950. Between 1947 and 1951, he promoted boxing there before temporarily stepping away during television contract discussions. By April 1952, after assembling $6,000 per week in regional sponsorships and seeking to purchase airtime from Dumont to control production himself, the show, Boxing from Eastern Parkway, was bought outright by DuMont as an $8,000-a-week package. Lence resumed operations in May 1952 with a Monday night television contract with DuMont and hired Teddy Brenner as matchmaker. The Brooklyn native operated Eastern Parkway Fights Corp. throughout the 1950s for promotional purposes. He spent several seasons promoting the arena's televised programs.

He exited in May 1955 after clashing with the Boxing Guild of New York, a boxing manager's guild that was later banned in New York. The anti-monopoly ruling against the International Boxing Club of New York (IBC) created his comeback opportunity, which aligned with Cus D'Amato, his old Eastern Parkway friend and manager of Floyd Patterson, splitting from the IBC. Patterson, the new titleholder, had 11 of his initial professional fights at Lence's Eastern Parkway Arena under Lence's promotional banner. While pursuing his first promotion of a heavyweight world championship fight, he reached an agreement with Patterson's manager.

Lence was licensed to conduct regular Tuesday night boxing shows at Eastern Parkway Arena in Brooklyn on May 17, 1957.

He became the first promoter outside the International Boxing Club to stage a heavyweight title bout since 1949, breaking James D. Norris's hold on heavyweight championships. On July 29, 1957, he staged Floyd Patterson's first heavyweight title defense against Tommy Hurricane Jackson at New York's Polo Grounds. Lence spent around $20,000 to stage the event.

While the Patterson-Jackson bout was a financial success, Lence soon departed from boxing and established a chain of bowling alleys. During the summer of 1957, he began constructing his first 30-lane bowling alley. He rose to become one of the largest bowling alley operators in the trade. By 1959, his portfolio included Manhattan Lanes in New York City, Bay Ridge Lanes in Brooklyn, and Woodhaven Lanes in Queens. In 1964, Federal Court charged Lence, the head of 31 corporations running bowling establishments in three states, with failure to file employers' quarterly Federal tax returns for late 1962 and failure to pay $300,000 in withholding taxes.

He went on to become a Wall Street mergers and acquisitions specialist. He made Florida his home beginning in 1991, after years of living in New York.

== Personal life ==
He married Anne Vulpis, who was a speed skater when they met at Eastern Parkway Roller Rink, and the couple had a daughter and a son, Jeanne and George.

== Death ==
Emil Lence died on June 16, 1993, in Delray Beach, Florida, United States, at 76 years old.
