= Ralph Citro =

American boxer

Ralph Citro (July 10, 1926 – October 2, 2004) was a boxing historian and archivist.

Citro was an amateur boxer while serving in the Marine Corps, compiling a record of 18–3. After leaving the service, he owned and operated gyms and began training boxers. He eventually became a cutman, serving in the corner for over 125 world championship fights.

Frustrated at the poor state of boxing's statistical record, Citro began to compile an exhaustive record of boxers and bouts in 1981. That led to the publication of the Computer Boxing Update, an annual record book that tracked the results of fights around the world. It became widely recognized as the authoritative source for information on active boxers. His research also reconstructed the bout-by-bout records of boxers from 1930 to 1980. Dan Cuoco, director of the International Boxing Research Organization, called Citro's work "one of the most important contributions to boxing in the past 50 years."

Citro also wrote an instructional book called "So You Want to Be A Cornerman."

In 1983, Citro was named Man of the Year by the United States Boxing Association. He was inducted into the International Boxing Hall of Fame in 2001 and the New Jersey Boxing Hall of Fame in 1989. Citro received the Boxing Writers Association of America's James J. Walker Award for long and meritorious service to boxing in 1993. Citro was the executive director of International Boxing Research Organization from 1994 to 2000.

Ralph Citro also owned and operated Citro Insurance of Gloucester Township, NJ. Citro Insurance sponsored many local youth sports teams.
