= Barney Nagler Award =

American boxing award

Barry Nagler Award
- Sport: Boxing
- Awarded for: "Long and Meritorious Service"
- Location: U.S.
- Presented by: Boxing Writers Association of America

History
- First award: 1940
- First winner: James J. Walker
- Most recent: John Sheppard

The Barney Nagler Award, previously known as the James J. Walker Memorial Award, has been conferred annually since 1940 by the Boxing Writers Association of America (BWAA) for Long and Meritorious Service in Boxing. The award is named after sportswriter Barney Nagler.

== History ==
First awarded in 1940, it was called the "Meritorious Service Award" until 1947.

=== James J. Walker Award ===
Named for James J. Walker, the award previously honored the former New York City mayor and politician behind the Walker Law. Walker was the first recipient of the organization's service award in 1940, which was renamed the James J. Walker Memorial Award after his death in 1946.

By 1965, the annual award had been presented to prominent boxing personalities like James A. Farley, Jack Dempsey, Gene Tunney, Mickey Walker, and Jimmy Walker.

=== Barney Nagler Award ===
The award was later renamed in honor of the late former BWAA president Barney Nagler.

The award is presented alongside other BWAA honors at the annual awards dinner.

== Past recipients ==
=== 1940s ===
- 1940 – (United States) James J. Walker
- 1941 – (United States) Gene Tunney
- 1943 – (United States) Nat Fleischer
- 1944 – (United States) John J. Phelan
- 1945 – (United States) James J. Johnston
- 1946 – (United States) Mike Jacobs
- 1947 – (United States) James A. Farley
- 1948 – (United States) Dan Morgan
- 1949 – (United States) Abe J. Greene

=== 1950s ===
- 1950 – (United States) Wilbur Wood
- 1951 – (United States) Edward P.F. Eagan
- 1952 – (United States) George A. Barton
- 1953 – (United States) Dr. Vincent A. Nardiello
- 1954 – (United States) James J. Braddock
- 1955 – (United States) Harry Mendel
- 1956 – (United States) Frank Graham
- 1957 – (United States) Jack Dempsey
- 1958 – (United States) Sam Taub
- 1959 – (United States) Marv Jensen

=== 1960s ===
- 1960 – (United States) Ned Brown
- 1961 – (United States) Dr. Alexander Schiff
- 1962 – (United States) Dr. Mal Stevens
- 1963 – (United States) Harry Markson
- 1964 – (United States) Mickey Walker
- 1965 – (United States) Jack Cuddy
- 1966 – (United States) Nat Fleischer
- 1967 – (United States) Joe Louis
- 1968 – (United States) John Condon
- 1969 – (United States) Murray Goodman

=== 1970s ===
- 1970 – (United States) Don Dunphy
- 1971 – (United States) Teddy Brenner
- 1972 – (United States) Dr. Edwin Campbell
- 1973 – (United States) Barney Nagler
- 1974 – (United States) Bobby Gleason
- 1975 – (United States) Daniel M. Daniel
- 1976 – (United States) Duke Stefano
- 1977 – (United States) Chris Dundee
- 1978 – (United States) Ray Arcel, Freddie Brown
- 1979 – (United States) Bobby Goodman, Marvin Kohn

=== 1980s ===
- 1980 – (United States) Nat Loubet
- 1981 – (United States) Bill Gallo
- 1982 – (United States) Eddie Futch
- 1983 – (United States) Tom Kenville
- 1984 – (United States) Muhammad Ali
- 1985 – (United States) Irving Rudd
- 1986 – (United States) Dick Young
- 1987 – (United States) Jack Fiske
- 1988 – (United States) Arthur Mercante
- 1989 – (United States) Marty Cohen

=== 1990s ===
- 1990 – (United States) Jay Edson
- 1991 – (United States) Howard Albert
- 1992 – (United States) Ralph Citro
- 1993 – (United States) Lou Duva
- 1994 – (United States) Willie Pep
- 1995 – (United States) Floyd Patterson
- 1996 – (United States) Angelo Dundee
- 1997 – (United States) Mills Lane
- 1998 – (United States) Steve Acunto
- 1999 – (United States) Al Gavin, Bob Jackson, Russell Peltz

=== 2000s ===
- 2000 – (United States) Gil Clancy
- 2001 – (United States) Don and Lorraine Chargin
- 2002 – (United States) Hank Kaplan
- 2003 – (United States) Jimmy Glenn
- 2004 – (United States) Marc Ratner
- 2005 – (United States) Teddy Blackburn
- 2006 – (United States) Larry Merchant
- 2007 – (United States) Nigel Collins
- 2008 – (United States) Steve Farhood
- 2009 – (United States) Jerry Izenberg

=== 2010s ===
- 2010 – (United States) Jack Obermayer
- 2011 – (United States) Don Elbaum
- 2012 – (United States) Kathy Duva & Bruce Trampler
- 2013 – (United States) Bob Sheridan & Lee Samuels
- 2014 – (United States) Jack Hirsch
- 2015 – (United States) Bernard Fernandez
- 2016 – (United States) Bill Caplan
- 2017 – (United States) Dr. Margaret Goodman
- 2018 – (United States) Jim Lampley
- 2019 – (United States) Bob Canobbio

=== 2020s ===
- 2020 – None
- 2021 – (United States) Michael Buffer
- 2022 – (United States) Ed Brophy
- 2023 – (United States) Gordon Hall
- 2024 – (United States) Brad Goodman
- 2025 – (United Kingdom) John Sheppard
