= Wilbur Wood (sportswriter) =

American sportswriter and editor (1892–1968)

- Born: Wilbur Wood; 1892; Kansas City, Missouri, U.S.
- Died: March 18, 1968 (aged 75–76); Hollywood, Florida, U.S.
- Occupation: Sportswriter
- Years active: 1913-1950
- Organization(s): St. Louis Republic; St. Louis Post-Dispatch; The New York Herald; The Sun
- Known for: His work for The Sun
- Awards: James J. Walker Award (1950)

Wilbur Wood (1892 – October 3, 1968) was an American sportswriter and editor who worked for The New York Sun from 1924 to 1950.

== Early life and education ==
Wood was born in Kansas City, Missouri, United States.

He received his education at Washington University in St. Louis. While attending Washington University, he competed in baseball and basketball and developed a friendship with J. Roy Stockton, who later credited Wood with influencing his decision to pursue sportswriting.

== Career ==
=== St. Louis Republic ===
After graduating, Wood started his journalism career as a sportswriter with the St. Louis Republic in 1913. Early on, he worked as a baseball correspondent, covering the St. Louis Cardinals. He was named president of the newly revived Illinois–Missouri League in April 1917, following the resignation of Winston Barker.

When the St. Louis Republic folded in 1919, he briefly moved to the St. Louis Post-Dispatch and served on the news copy desk. From St. Louis, he moved on to newspaper work in Akron, Cleveland, and Milwaukee prior to settling in New York.

=== New York Herald ===
The Kansas City native relocated to New York City to work as a sportswriter for The New York Herald. He earned a reputation in New York through his reporting on boxing in the 1920s and routinely closed his pieces with the motto "Don't bet on fights."

=== New York Sun ===
After The Herald combined with the New-York Tribune in 1924, he went to work for the now-defunct New York Sun. While working at the Sun, he became associated with Frank Graham and Grantland Rice.

In March 1927, he was elected the first president of the Boxing Writers Association of America. That year, he began compiling an annual consensus ranking known as the National Boxing Consensus. It drew on the opinions of 60 sportswriters, promoters, and boxing authorities who evaluated the top 10 fighters in each weight class.

Wood became sports editor of The Sun in 1934 after the death of Joe Vila. During this period, Edwin B. Dooley, who went on to become chairman of the New York State Athletic Commission, worked as a sports reporter under Wood.

He appeared as a guest of NBC sports announcer Bill Stern during the Sports Scraps program on March 20, 1938.

He held his position as sports editor of the Sun until the newspaper was taken over by the New York World-Telegram in 1950.

== Death ==
Wood died of a stroke at his home in Hollywood, Florida, United States, on March 18, 1968, at 76.

== Awards ==
- BWAA James J. Walker Award (1950)
