= Mike Walczewski =

American public address announcer (born 1956)

Michael T. Walczewski (born January 9, 1956) is an American public address announcer best known for his work for the New York Knicks of the National Basketball Association.

A native of Queens, Walczewski resides in Hastings-on-Hudson, New York.

Walczewski has served as the arena voice of the Knicks since 1989 (replacing the late John F.X. Condon) and the New York Liberty of the WNBA since their inception in 1997. He also voices for many college basketball games at Madison Square Garden. Furthermore, his voice talents can be heard in a television advertisement for Dr Pepper, an episode of Sex and the City, and the 1995 Billy Crystal film Forget Paris. During the 1990s, Walczewski announced many Knicks playoff games at Madison Square Garden. He saw the Knicks, led by Patrick Ewing, reach the NBA Eastern Conference Finals 4 times from 1993 to 2000, and was also able to see them make 3 NBA Finals appearances (1994, 1999, 2026) and win one championship (2026). He is well known for his in-arena calls of "PAT-RICK EWING!" (when Patrick Ewing scored a basket), "Ooooooone shot..." (when a player is taking one free throw after a made field goal on which they were fouled.) and "Threeeeeee point goal (player's name)" when a player makes a three pointer.

Before being the PA voice of the Knicks, Walczewski was the voice of the Fordham Rams men's basketball team—a position he took after his graduation from the university in 1979.

He was also a contest on Wheel of Fortune during season 12, winning just under $4,000 in cash and prizes, but coming in second to a contestant named Renae, thereby not advancing to the bonus round. Mike's episode is better-known for Renae's nonsense sentence "Being on Wheel of Fortune has been a 'bombastic' experience." (The category "MEGAWORD" is now defunct on the show) The sentence was credited, however, as being "sensible" enough to be correct.
