= Harry Markson =

American boxing promoter (1906–1998)

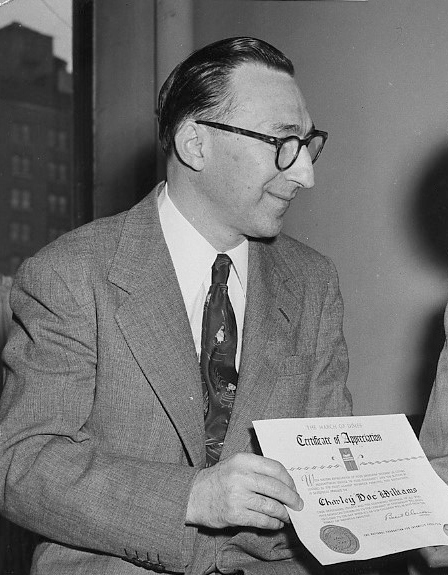
- Born: March 10, 1906; Kingston, New York, U.S.
- Died: November 10, 1998 (aged 92); Red Bank, New Jersey, U.S.
- Occupations: Boxing promoter; publicist

Harry Markson (March 10, 1906 – November 10, 1998) was an American boxing publicist and promoter who organized fights at Madison Square Garden for nearly 40 years.

== Early life and education ==
Harry Markson was born March 10, 1906, in Kingston, New York, in the United States. In 1927, Markson graduated from Union College in Schenectady.

== Career ==
The Union College graduate had an early career as a reporter for the Bronx Home News and became their sportswriter. He later joined the boxing department of Madison Square Garden as a press agent in 1933. He worked under boxing promoter Mike Jacobs of the Twentieth Century Sporting Club, which was an operator of Madison Square Garden boxing shows. As both a sportswriter and later boxing director, Markson helped manage more than 2,000 fights. Publicizing Mike Jacob's fight shows, he did well with exhibitions featuring Willie Pep and Chalky Wright. In 1942, Markson had envisioned a winter season driven by the young Clevelander Jimmy Bivins' standout performances. 12,000 fans witnessed 10 rounds of Bivins vs. Lee Savold at the Garden. The main event turned out poorly for Markson, resulting in a lackluster performance with little excitement.

In October 1948, the Twentieth Century Sporting Club made several changes in the front office of the promotional organization. Harry Markson, who was the publicity chief, became the managing director of the Twentieth Century Sporting Club. He was retained by James Norris, who controlled the International Boxing Club of New York. Markson served in the position until 1973. He was responsible for signing fighters and staging matches.

A Supreme Court ruling on boxing monopoly forced Norris to give up control of the boxing program in 1959, while the new management kept Markson. Markson, now in charge of boxing for Madison Square Garden, brought in Teddy Brenner as a matchmaker that year.

He recommended Angelo Dundee as Muhammad Ali's trainer to William Faversham in 1960.

In 1962, the boxing promoter made the decisive move to ban Sugar Ray Robinson from fighting at Madison Square Garden, believing the legendary fighter should retire.

The Boxing Writers Association of America (BWAA) honored Markson with the James J. Walker Memorial Award (now Barney Nagler Award) in 1963 for his "long and meritorious service" to boxing.

He had always gotten along with Muhammad Ali. Markson's management played a role in staging Cassius Clay vs. Doug Jones in 1963. In 1964, Harry Markson refused to recognize Ali's name change during Luis Manuel Rodríguez vs. Holley Mims held at the Garden. With Markson insisting on Cassius Clay, Ali walked out in protest, drawing boos from the crowd. Markson later regretted the decision, influenced by his stance on the Nation of Islam and antisemitism, and stated that he would have respected Ali's preferred name if he could go back.

While in Rome in 1967 to negotiate with Italian boxer Nino Benvenuti, he had the opportunity to meet Pope Paul VI. When introduced to the pope as Harry Markson of Madison Square Garden, the pontiff held up his hands in the classic boxer's pose and said, "Ah, Madison Square Garden—boxing".

By 1968, Markson and Teddy Brenner were holding Friday Night Fights at the Felt Forum, a 5,000-seat venue affiliated with the Garden, to develop talent for bigger events. Markson called it an "incubator" for promising fighters.

In 1969, the director of the boxing operation was named president of Madison Square Garden Boxing, Inc., the Garden's wholly owned boxing subsidiary. With Markson overseeing the overall profit and loss of the Garden's boxing events, Brenner had a strong voice in policy decisions and was granted almost full autonomy in selecting fighters and negotiating terms. The Markson-Brenner team helped to develop Joe Frazier's career, featuring him several times at Madison Square Garden. Markson played a key role in the staging of Muhammad Ali vs. Joe Frazier, billed as "Fight of the Century," in 1971. In an effort to secure the fight, he and Brenner visited Philadelphia, offering Smokin' Joe and Yancy Durham $1.25 million—unprecedented then. After losing the bid to Jerry Perenchio, they were approached to host the event at the Garden. The event drew 20,455 spectators and earned $1,353,000 from ticket sales, the largest amount for any indoor sports event anywhere.

Throughout the early 1970s, he had an influence on the boxing career of Scottish world lightweight champion Ken Buchanan, calling him "one of the best boxers of any nationality he had ever seen."

The veteran boxing promoter retired on March 31, 1973, and was succeeded as president by Teddy Brenner, the matchmaker for the Garden. After retiring, he remained honorary president of the Madison Square Garden Boxing Club, acting as a consultant to Brenner. He and his wife moved to Little Silver, New Jersey in 1974 after 35 years of living in Brooklyn.

In a February 1993 article in the New York Times, he remarked, "I don't like the fact that boxing is a casino sport. It doesn't belong there, it belongs in an arena. It should be in the mainstream of sports, just like basketball or any other major sport. I'm not happy about it, and I'm glad I'm not a part of it."

== Family ==
He had a son named Robert Markson. Harry's nephew was American novelist David Markson.

== Death ==
Harry Markson died at 92 years old on November 11, 1998, in Red Bank, New Jersey, United States.

== Legacy ==
In 1992, Harry Markson was inducted into the International Boxing Hall of Fame as a non-participant. He was later inducted into the New York State Boxing Hall of Fame with the class of 2015.

The Harry Markson Award (now Ali-Frazier Award) was awarded by the Boxing Writers Association of America for fight of the year.

Teddy Brenner, his former matchmaking partner, said, "Harry was a cultured guy who was as happy watching opera as being at a boxing match, but he was also a tough guy in a tough business."
