= Ali–Frazier Award =

American boxing award

- Sport: Boxing
- Awarded for: "Fight of the Year"
- Country: U.S.
- Presented by: Boxing Writers Association of America

The Ali–Frazier Award, known alternatively as the Boxing Writers of America Fight of the Year and previously known as the Harry Markson Award prior to 2009, has been conferred annually since the BWAA's awards dinner in 2003. The BWAA votes on the best fight of each year regardless of the weight class or nationality of the fighters.

The award was originally named for Harry Markson, a boxing promoter and publicist who served for five years as the president of boxing operations at Madison Square Garden. In 2009, the award was renamed the Ali–Frazier Award in honor of Muhammad Ali and Joe Frazier, and their epic fight trilogy including the Fight of the Century. The award is presented with other honors given by the BWAA at an annual awards dinner.

== Past recipients ==
Year	Date	Location	Winner	Loser	Result	Weight class	World title(s) at stake	Notes
2002	May 18	Uncasville, Connecticut, United States	Micky Ward; United States	Arturo Gatti; Canada	Majority decision after 10 rounds (95–93, 94–93, 94–94)	Welterweight	None	First fight in Gatti-Ward trilogy
2003	April 26	Mashantucket, Connecticut, United States	James Toney; United States	Vassily Jirov; Kazakhstan	Unanimous decision after 12 rounds (117–109, 117–109, 116–110)	Cruiserweight	IBF cruiserweight title (Jirov)	
2004	November 27	Las Vegas, Nevada, United States	Marco Antonio Barrera; Mexico	Erik Morales; Mexico	Majority decision after 12 rounds (115–113, 115–114, 114–114)	Super featherweight	WBC super featherweight (Barrera)	Final fight of trilogy between the two
2005	May 7	Las Vegas, Nevada, United States	Diego Corrales; United States	José Luis Castillo; Mexico	Technical knockout, in tenth of 12 rounds	Lightweight	WBC lightweight title (Castillo); WBO lightweight title (Corrales)	First of two 2005 fights between the two
2006	March 18	Levallois-Perret, France	Somsak Sithchatchawal; Thailand	Mahyar Monshipour; France	Technical knockout, in tenth of 12 rounds	Super bantamweight	WBA super bantamweight title (Monshipour)	
2007	September 29	Atlantic City, New Jersey, United States	Kelly Pavlik; United States	Jermain Taylor; United States	Technical knockout, in seventh of 12 rounds	Middleweight	WBC and WBO middleweight titles (Taylor)	First of two fights between the two
2008	March 1	Carson, California, United States	Israel Vázquez; Mexico	Rafael Márquez; Mexico	Split decision after 12 rounds (114–111, 113–112, 111–114)	Super bantamweight	WBC super bantamweight title (Vázquez)	Third fight of the Márquez–Vázquez rivalry
2009	February 28	Houston, Texas, United States	Juan Manuel Márquez; Mexico	Juan Díaz; United States	Technical knockout, in ninth of 12 rounds	Lightweight	WBO lightweight title (vacant); WBA (Super) lightweight title (vacant)	First of two fights between the two
2010	December 11	Las Vegas, Nevada, United States	Amir Khan; United Kingdom	Marcos Maidana; Argentina	Unanimous decision after 12 rounds (114–111, 114–111, 113–112)	Light welterweight	WBA light welterweight title (Khan)	Amir Khan vs. Marcos Maidana
2011	July 15	New York, New York, United States	Majority draw after ten rounds (97–93, 95–95, 95–95) between (Dominican Republic) Delvin Rodriguez and (Poland) Pawel Wolak			Super welterweight	None	First of two fights between the two
2012	December 8	Las Vegas, Nevada, United States	Juan Manuel Marquez; Mexico	Manny Pacquiao; Philippines	Knockout, in the sixth of 12 rounds	Welterweight	None	Fourth fight between the two
2013	March 16	Carson, California, United States	Timothy Bradley; United States	Ruslan Provodnikov; Russia	Unanimous decision after 12 rounds (115–112, 114–113, 114–113)	Welterweight	WBO welterweight title (Bradley)	
2014	April 26	Carson, California, United States	Lucas Matthysse; Argentina	John Molina, Jr. United States	Knockout, in the eleventh of 12 rounds	Light welterweight	None	
2015	November 21	Las Vegas, Nevada, United States	Francisco Vargas; Mexico	Takashi Miura; Japan	Technical knockout, in the ninth of 12 rounds	Super featherweight	WBC super featherweight title (Miura)	Takashi Miura vs. Francisco Vargas
2016	June 4	StubHub Center, Carson, California, United States	Majority draw after 12 rounds (115–113, 114–114, 114–114) between (Mexico) Francisco Vargas and (Mexico) Orlando Salido			Super featherweight	WBC super featherweight title (Vargas)	
2017	April 29	Wembley Stadium, London, England	Anthony Joshua; United Kingdom	Wladimir Klitschko; Ukraine	Knockout, after 11 rounds	Heavyweight	IBF heavyweight title (Joshua); WBA (Super) heavyweight title (vacant)	Anthony Joshua vs. Wladimir Klitschko
2018	April 7	The Joint, Paradise, Nevada, United States	Jarrett Hurd; United States	Erislandy Lara; Cuba	Split decision after 12 rounds (113–114, 114–113, 114–113)	Super welterweight	WBA (Super) super welterweight title (Lara); IBF super welterweight title (Hurd)	
2019	November 7	Saitama Super Arena, Saitama, Japan	Naoya Inoue; Japan	Nonito Donaire; Philippines	Unanimous decision after 12 rounds (117–109, 116–111, 114–113)	Bantamweight	WBA (Super) bantamweight title (Donaire); IBF bantamweight title (Inoue)	2018–19 World Boxing Super Series Bantamweight final, Naoya Inoue vs. Nonito Donaire
2020	October 3	MGM Grand Conference Center, Paradise, Nevada	Jose Zepeda; United States	Ivan Baranchyk; Belarus	Knockout, in the fifth of 10 rounds	Light welterweight	None	Jose Zepeda vs. Ivan Baranchyk
2021	October 9	T-Mobile Arena, Paradise, Nevada	Tyson Fury; United Kingdom	Deontay Wilder; United States	Knockout, in the eleventh of 12 rounds	Heavyweight	WBC heavyweight title (Fury)	Final fight of trilogy between the two
2022	March 12	Motorpoint Arena, Nottingham, England	Leigh Wood; United Kingdom	Michael Conlan; Ireland	Technical knockout, in the twelfth of 12 rounds	Featherweight	WBA (Regular) featherweight title (Wood)	
2023	June 10	Toyota Arena, Ontario, California	Jaime Munguía; Mexico	Sergiy Derevyanchenko; Ukraine	Unanimous decision after 12 rounds (115–112, 114–113, 114–113)	Super Middleweight	None	
2024	May 18	Kingdom Arena, Riyadh, Saudi Arabia	Oleksandr Usyk; Ukraine	Tyson Fury; United Kingdom	Split decision after 12 rounds (115–112, 114–113, 113–114)	Heavyweight	WBC (Fury); WBA (Super), IBF, WBO, IBO, and The Ring (Usyk)	First of two fights between the two
2025	April 26	Tottenham Hotspur Stadium, London, England	Chris Eubank Jr; United Kingdom	Conor Benn; United Kingdom	Unanimous decision after 12 rounds (116–112, 116–112, 116–112)	Middleweight	None	First of two fights between the two

== See also ==
- The Ring magazine Fight of the Year
- BWAA Fighter of the Year
