= Eastern Parkway Arena =

Former arena in Brooklyn, New York

Coordinates: 40°40′10″N 73°55′15″W

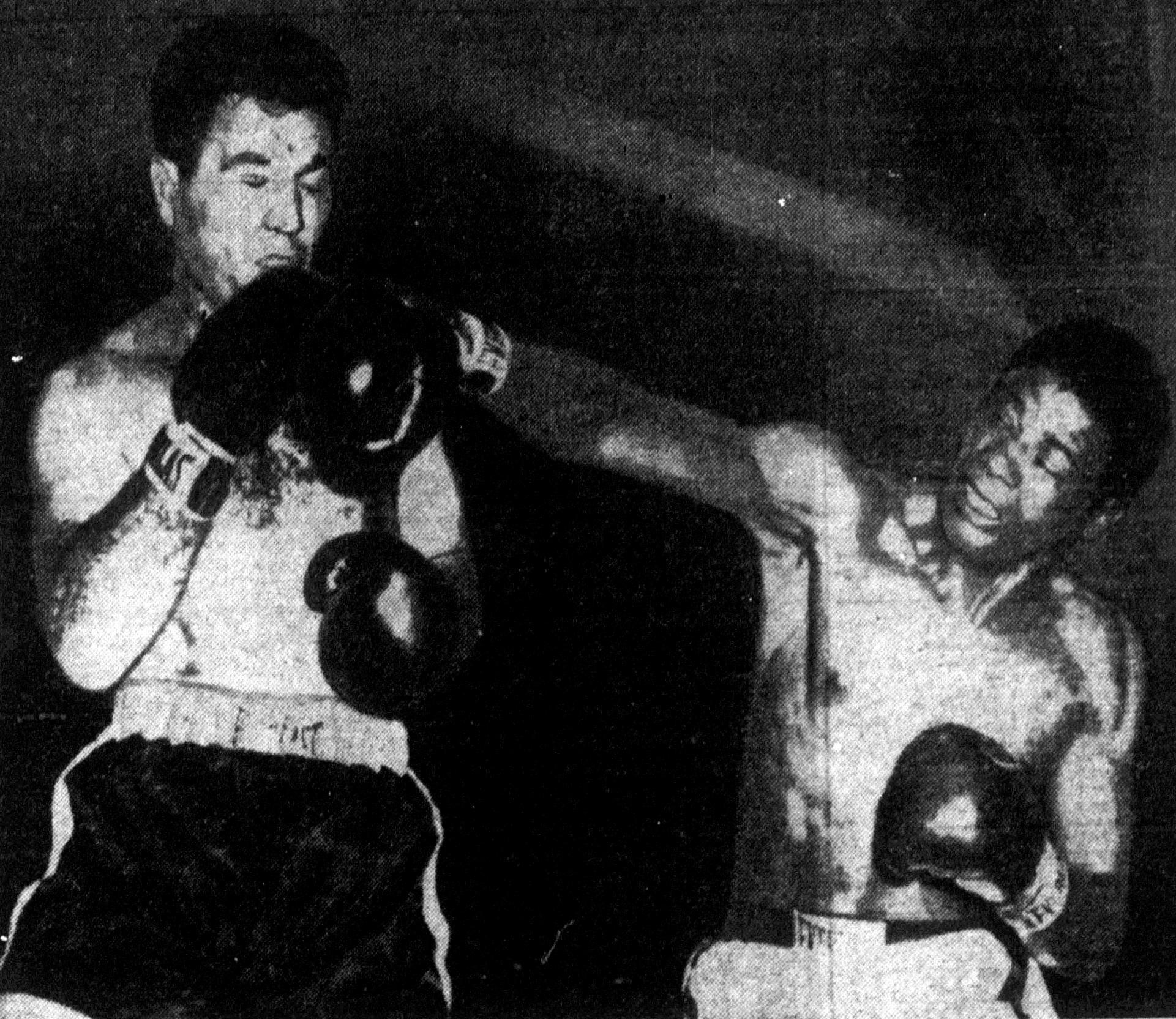
1954 match between Joey Maxim and Floyd Patterson at Eastern Parkway Arena

Eastern Parkway Arena was a sports venue located in Brownsville, Brooklyn. Originally an indoor roller rink, in 1944 it was bought by dress manufacturer Emil Lence and his father John Lence, who converted it to a boxing club in 1947. The arena was located on Eastern Parkway at the intersection of Howard Avenue.

Under the supervision of matchmaker Teddy Brenner, the arena became known as the "House of Upsets" for its competitive matches. Brenner used the arena to feature young fighters such as Bobo Olson, Gene Fullmer, Walter Cartier, and most notably Floyd Patterson, who fought there twelve times between 1952 and 1955, winning them all except a highly controversial 1954 loss by decision to Joey Maxim.

The arena was known for hosting Boxing from Eastern Parkway, a weekly broadcast on the DuMont Television Network from 1952 to 1954, followed by another year on ABC until May 1955, when ABC failed to renew its contract with the arena after picking up the rights to show fights at the International Boxing Club. The arena hosted a few more fights in 1958 and was later torn down.
