= Dan Birmingham =

American boxing trainer

Dan Birmingham is a boxing trainer based in St. Petersburg, Florida, USA, who is best known for his work with the former World light middleweight Champion Winky Wright. Birmingham trained Wright since he began his boxing career, and remained with him until his retirement.

Birmingham is the trainer of the 2000 Olympian and former IBF super middleweight Champion Jeff Lacy (a fellow St. Petersburg native) and the highly regarded former world champion Chad Dawson. Birmingham is also the trainer of former world champion Keith Thurman and world title challenger Edner Cherry.
