= Frank Graham Jr. =

American nature writer (1925–2025)

- Born: March 31, 1925; New York City, U.S.
- Died: May 25, 2025 (aged 100); Milbridge, Maine, U.S.
- Occupation: Writer
- Spouse: Ada Cogan (m. 1953)
- Writing career
- Language: English
- Genres: Nature writing; environmental journalism

Frank Graham Jr. (March 31, 1925 – May 25, 2025) was an American nature writer and longtime editor and contributor to Audubon Magazine.

== Career ==
Graham wrote for Audubon for more than four decades, serving as field editor and publishing features. In 1970, he published the book Since Silent Spring an update of Rachel Carson's Silent Spring. Graham died on May 25, 2025, at the age of 100.

== Death ==
Graham died at his home in Maine at the age of 100.

== Selected works ==
- Since Silent Spring.
- The Adirondack Park: A Political History.
- The Audubon Ark: A History of the National Audubon Society.
