= The Bronx Home News =

Former newspaper of The Bronx, New York City

- Type: Daily newspaper
- Founded: January 26, 1907 (as The Home News)
- Ceased publication: 1948
- Political alignment: neutral news coverage

The Bronx Home News (originally The Home News) was a newspaper from The Bronx.

== History ==
The Bronx Home News was originally known as The Home News. It was founded in 1907 by James O'Flaherty, Jr. with its initial publication on January 26, 1907. It was published in the Bronx and it served the Bronx and northern Manhattan. It was purchased in 1945 by Dorothy Schiff, president and publisher of the New York Post. It merged with the Post in 1948. All copies of the newspaper are now located at the Bronx Historical Society.
