= Boxing from Eastern Parkway =

- Genre: Sports
- Presented by: Ted Husing (May 1952 – March 1953); Chris Schenkel (March 1953 – May 1954)
- Country of origin: United States
- Original language: English

Production
- Running time: 90–120 minutes

Original release
- Network: DuMont
- Release: May 1952 – May 1954

Boxing from Eastern Parkway is an American sports program broadcast by the DuMont Television Network from May 1952 to May 1954. The program aired boxing matches from Eastern Parkway Arena in Brooklyn, New York. The program aired Monday nights at 10 pm ET and was 90 to 120 minutes long. During the 1953–1954 season, the program aired Mondays at 9 pm ET.

== Episode status ==
The UCLA Film and Television Archive has about 30 episodes in its collection, dating from December 1952 to October 1953.

== See also ==
- List of programs broadcast by the DuMont Television Network
- List of surviving DuMont Television Network broadcasts
- 1952-53 United States network television schedule
- 1953-54 United States network television schedule

== Bibliography ==
- David Weinstein, The Forgotten Network: DuMont and the Birth of American Television (Philadelphia: Temple University Press, 2004) ISBN 1-59213-245-6
- Alex McNeil, Total Television, Fourth edition (New York: Penguin Books, 1980) ISBN 0-14-024916-8
- Tim Brooks and Earle Marsh, The Complete Directory to Prime Time Network TV Shows, Third edition (New York: Ballantine Books, 1964) ISBN 0-345-31864-1
