= Margaret Goodman =

Canandian-American neurologist

- Born: April 12, 1953 (age 73); Toronto, Ontario, Canada
- Citizenship: Canada; United States
- Occupations: Neurologist; author

Margaret Goodman is a Canadian-American neurologist, anti-doping advocate, columnist, and author. She is best known for her work as a ringside physician for the Nevada State Athletic Commission and as the founder and president of the Voluntary Anti-Doping Association (VADA). Goodman also wrote a monthly column for The Ring magazine called "The Fight Doctor”. In 2021, Goodman was inducted into the International Boxing Hall of Fame.

== Early life and education ==
Goodman was born in Toronto, Ontario, on April 12, 1953. Her father, Nat Goodman, was a professional musician, record producer and manager. The family moved to Los Angeles, California when Goodman was a child. She graduated from Beverly Hills High School in 1971 and earned a bachelor's degree from the University of California at Los Angeles (UCLA) in 1975. This was followed by a medical degree from Chicago Medical School in 1984. Goodman helped pay for medical school by singing. Goodman completed her internal medicine internship and residency in neurology at the West Los Angeles VA Medical Center and UCLA in 1988.

== Career ==
In 1988, Goodman joined a private practice in Las Vegas. In 1996, she started her own practice.

=== Nevada State Athletic Commission ===
Goodman got involved with boxing in 1992, originally working ringside at amateurs matches giving free physicals. In 1993, Goodman started doing neurological consultations for the Nevada State Athletic Commission. In 1994, a she got a job on the commission's medical staff initially being assigned to professional wrestling events. When she started working boxing fights, she was one of the few female ringside physicians in the world.

Goodman was later appointed as the Medical Advisory Chairman for NSAC by Governor Kenny Guinn in 2001. She was also promoted to chief ringside physician in 2004. In these positions, Goodman spearhead cheaper MRI testing for fighters, leading to Nevada becoming the second state in the United States to institute routine neuroimaging.

Goodman resigned from her position as chief ringside physician in 2005 after months of infighting at the commission over stricter safety measures, although she remained medical advisory chairman until the end of her term in 2007.

=== Voluntary Anti-Doping Association ===
In 2011, Goodman and her partner Flip Homansky founded the Voluntary Anti-Doping Association or VADA, where fighters could voluntarily be drug tested and learn more about performance-enhancing drugs. Goodman served as the organisation's president and chair.

Since the creation of VADA, almost 200 fighters have joined their testing pool, including notable boxers and MMA fighters:

- Wladimir Klitschko
- Anthony Joshua
- Tyson Fury
- Deontay Wilder
- Ben Askren
- Georges St-Pierre
- Manny Pacquiao and
- Rory MacDonald.

== Writing ==
Goodman wrote a monthly column for The Ring magazine called "The Fight Doctor" for eight years from 2004 to 2012.

Goodman also co-authored and edited the 2001 book Ringside and Training Principles. She is also the author of the 2014 medical suspense thriller Death in Vegas. .

== Awards and honours ==
In 2005, Goodman was awarded the BWAA James A. Farley Award for Honesty and Integrity in Boxing. In 2017, she was awarded the Barney Nagler Award for Long and Meritorious Service to Boxing by the Boxing Writers Association of America.

In 2021, Goodman was inducted into the International Boxing Hall of Fame.

== Personal life ==
Goodman's partner Dr. Edwin “Flip” Homansky, was also a ringside physician for the commission.
