= Boxing Writers Association of America =

Sports journalism organization

The Boxing Writers Association of America (BWAA) was originally formed in 1926 as the Boxing Writers Association of Greater New York. The association's purpose is to promote better working conditions for boxing writers, as well as hold its writers to the highest professional and ethical standards. The BWAA has a yearly awards banquet where it names fighter, fight, and trainer of the year, among other awards.

== Awards ==
=== Decennial ===
- Joe Louis Award (BWAA Fighter of the Decade)

=== Annual ===
- Sugar Ray Robinson Award (BWAA Fighter of the Year)
- Muhammad Ali–Joe Frazier Award (BWAA Fight of the Year)
- Eddie Futch Award (BWAA Trainer of the Year)
- Cus D'Amato Award (BWAA Manager of the Year)
- Barney Nagler Award (Long and meritorious service)
- Sam Taub Award (Excellence in broadcasting journalism)
- Nat Fleischer Award (Excellence in boxing journalism)
- Bill Crawford Award
- Christy Martin Award (Female Fighter of the Year)
- Marvin Kohn Good Guy Award

=== Other ===
- James A. Farley Award (Honesty and Integrity)
- A.J. Liebling Award (Outstanding boxing writing)

== See also ==
- National Sportscasters and Sportswriters Association
