= Chic Feldman =

American sportswriter

- Born: Samuel Feldman; Scranton, Pennsylvania, U.S.
- Died: January 7, 1972; New York City, New York, U.S.
- Occupation: Sportswriter
- Years active: 1918-1972
- Organization(s): Scranton Sunday Telegram; The Scrantontian; The Scranton Tribune
- Known for: His work for The Scranton Times-Tribune
- Honors: Pennsylvania Boxing Hall of Fame (1979)

Chic Feldman was an American sportswriter and columnist who wrote for The Scrantonian (1924–1972) and The Scranton Tribune (1938–1972).

== Early life and education ==
Samuel Feldman, nicknamed Chic, was born during the 1900s in Scranton, Pennsylvania, United States.

The Scranton native entered organized athletics with the Boys Industrial Association, where he excelled in basketball and baseball while the B.I.A. operated out of St. Luke's Parish House. Alfred J. Bevan, superintendent of the B.I.A., recognized Feldman's writing ability and assigned him to prepare the organization's press releases, a role he held for several years. He was the editor of the Red Ribbon, the local Boys' Club paper until 1918.

== Career ==
=== Bevan Five ===
He was a member of the B.I.A. Bevan Five of Scranton that won the first-class basketball championship in 1918–19.

Feldman became coach of the basketball team at O.S. Johnson School (now Johnson College) in March 1921, starting five weeks before the season ended.

He carried on his basketball career and managed the champion B.I.A. Bevan Five into the 1921–1922 season, playing at the gymnasium of Scranton-Lackawanna Business College (now Lackawanna College). The previous season, the team had achieved 25 wins in 30 games. After winning the first-class basketball title for three years straight, he continued as the team's manager into the 1922–1923 season. The team successfully defended their title after facing the Taylor All-Scholastics for the independent championship of northeastern Pennsylvania, on February 21, 1923.

In addition to basketball, he was involved in local baseball. He served as secretary of the County Baseball League in 1922 before he succeeded Ellis Riskin in 1923 when he was named president of the County Baseball League, then a popular amateur baseball circuit with eight clubs.

In the early 1920s, he was convinced by Chauncey H. Derby to take the sports editor position at the Scranton Sunday Telegram, a role he held until July 1924.

=== The Scrantonian ===
During the summer of 1924, Feldman began working as a sportswriter with another Sunday newspaper, then known as The Scrantonian. He built his reputation reporting on boxing, baseball, and wrestling. The Scrantonian boxing critic described Pete Latzo's 1926 victory over Mickey Walker for the world welterweight title as the greatest moment in Scranton sports history. During his career, he covered over 50 championship bouts.

=== Deputy Boxing Commissioner ===
He was appointed deputy boxing commissioner for the Pennsylvania State Boxing Commission in March 1927. A large gathering of over 200 sportsmen and journalists assembled at the Hotel Jermyn to recognize the commissioner's appointment, with J. Julius Levy acting as master of ceremonies and boxing promoter Humbert Fugazy delivering remarks. Feldman's duties included weigh-ins and the enforcement of other regulations of the state body. He served on the commission until 1935.

In January 1928, he was named as one of the 15 directors of the Scranton Amateur Baseball Federation, which governed amateur baseball in Scranton. He greatly admired the sport, especially during the 1940s when Scranton fielded the Scranton Miners, a minor league team.

=== The Tribune ===
After the Scrantonian took over The Scranton Tribune in 1938, he became sports editor of both papers, writing daily columns and two Sunday features, "Hatchin' 'Em Out" and "Dishin' the Dirt." His columns were published in The Scranton Tribune daily and the Scrantonian on weekends.

He was frequently recognized for the depth of his sports journalism. When he reached 30 years as a sports writer, a Chic Feldman Testimonial Banquet was held in November 1951 at The Hotel Casey. The featured entertainer was Joey Adams. Among the many notable guests included Eddie Sawyer, Ray Arcel, Dan Carnevale, Red Sarachek, Joe Paparella, Cy Perkins, Jimmy Goodrich, Billy Soose, Pete Latzo, Milton Richman, and Harry P. O'Neill. On December 10, 1967, another Chic Feldman Testimonial Banquet was held at The Hotel Casey as a tribute to Feldman's 45 years of public service as a sportswriter.

From 1958 to 1964, he covered harness racing at Monticello Raceway on a regular basis with Jimmy Calpin who later succeeded him. In addition to the Catskill harness track, he provided coverage of the Pocono Downs, a Luzerne County track, starting in 1965. He once served as president of the Monticello-Goshen Chapter of the United States Harness Writers Association.

He took an interest in Tommy Hicks's boxing career and played a major role in having Bob Foster defend his WBC light heavyweight title in Scranton in 1971.

== Personal life ==
He was a personal friend of Dan Parker of the New York Daily Mirror for over 25 years. He was a longtime member of the Friends of Boxing organization.

== Death ==
Feldman died in New York City, New York, United States, on January 7, 1972. The veteran sports editor experienced a fatal heart attack while attending the Tommy Hicks–Dennis McNamee main event at Madison Square Garden. He collapsed at his typewriter and onto the shoulder of boxing trainer Ray Arcel during the seventh round and was pronounced dead after efforts by the ringside physician. His death was announced at ringside by Garden publicist John F.X. Condon.

== Legacy ==
Feldman, a sportswriter for over 49 years, was considered the dean of sportswriters in Northeastern Pennsylvania. He received the distinguished service award for "services to boxing beyond the call of duty" from the National Veteran Boxers Association in October 1965. He was the first recipient of the 1969 East Coast Boxing Award in July 1970. The award was dedicated to a "person in the boxing game who has dedicated his career to the betterment and rise of boxing, and the rules of fair play." Feldman received a full-page feature in the East Coast Boxing Yearbook by Malcolm "Flash" Gordon, with editors Johnny Bos and Bruce Trampler. Among those who voted were Duke Stefano, Lester Bromberg, Chris Dundee, Sam Silverman, and Nat Fleischer. He was voted the first annual Mike Latzo Award winner by the Madison Square Garden Committee in September 1970. He was posthumously inducted into the University of Scranton Wall of Fame in 1972. He was later inducted into the Pennsylvania Boxing Hall of Fame on December 6, 1979.

=== Scranton Area Sports Hall of Fame ===
He was the driving force of the Scranton Area Sports Hall of Fame. Originating in 1968 under the sponsorship of The Scrantonian, The Scranton Tribune, and Gibbons Beer (now Lion Brewery, Inc.), he established a committee of veteran sports observers, which he worked with for four years, from 1968 to 1971. He became the 61st member of the Hall when he was voted in by acclamation of those in attendance at the 1971 induction banquet. The Hall of Fame effort was abandoned in 1972 following Feldman's death. The Chic Feldman Scranton Area Sports Hall of Fame was renamed after him when it was revived by the Feldman Foundation in 1974.

=== Chic Feldman Foundation ===
After his death, a group of Feldman's close associates came together to establish a memorial organization in his name known as the Chic Feldman Foundation. Proceeds from the foundation's boxing shows and other activities supported charitable causes. The Feldman Foundation concluded its 30-year history of charitable giving in 2008, when its longtime president, former Pennsylvania state senator Bob Mellow, presented the final donation.

=== Chic Feldman Humanitarian Award ===
In 1972, the Monticello-Goshen chapter of the United States Harness Writers Association inaugurated the first annual Chic Feldman Humanitarian Award in his memory, recognizing his efforts in advancing the track in Monticello, New York.

=== Chic Feldman Memorial Pace ===
Monticello Raceway was among Feldman's preferred venues, where he was described as the "finest friend the track ever had." The annual Chic Feldman Memorial Pace, established at Monticello Raceway in 1980, honored the late sportswriter.

=== Chic Feldman Field ===
In September 1973, he became the namesake of Chic Feldman Memorial Field, formerly called the Pine Brook Recreation Field, in Scranton's Pine Brook neighborhood.
