= Joe Reardon (baseball executive) =

American baseball executive (1906–1982)

- Born: Joseph F. Reardon; 1906; Scranton, Pennsylvania, U.S.
- Died: June 24, 1982 (aged 75–76); Scranton, Pennsylvania, U.S.
- Burial place: Cathedral Cemetery
- Occupation: Sports executive
- Known for: His work for Philadelphia Phillies
- Honors: Scranton Area Sports Hall of Fame (1978)

Joe Reardon (1906 – June 24, 1982) was an American sports executive who was associated with the Philadelphia Phillies from 1943 to 1954.

== Early life ==
Born in South Scranton, Pennsylvania, he was the son of Mary and Martin F. Reardon.

In his early years, he drove a taxi and then officiated as an amateur umpire, advancing from sandlot baseball to the minor leagues before taking on executive roles.

== Executive career ==
=== Boston Red Sox (1937-1943) ===
Beginning in 1937, he spent two years with the Boston Braves. He later received a major break from Billy Evans, head of the Boston Red Sox farm system, involving a minor league affiliate in Scranton in the Eastern League.

==== Scranton Red Sox ====
Reardon was named business manager of the Scranton Red Sox, also known as the Scranton Miners in 1939. He added lights to Athletic Park (now Scranton Memorial Stadium), arranged broadcasts for games, and created promotional events such as Italian Night, Irish Night, and others. He had huge success in 1939 when Scranton attracted 317,000 paying spectators, setting a minor league record. With players such as Tex Hughson from the Red Sox, Reardon led Scranton to an Eastern League pennant that season.

When the team relocated to a new park in Dunmore, Pennsylvania in 1940, he was the main figure overseeing the transition. Ahead of 1940 season, he helped construct one of the top minor league stadiums, inaugurating it with a Wilkes-Barre Barons doubleheader that drew 16,386 fans, the most in Eastern League history at the time.

His ability as an executive caught the attention of Herb Pennock, the new Boston Red Sox farm director at the time. He took on a dual role, managing activities for both the Scranton and Boston teams at once. By March 1941, he had seven Boston farm clubs under his supervision, including, Scranton, Greensboro, Canton, Danville, Owensboro, Centreville, Maryland and Oneonta. Reardon spent six years as Pennock's assistant director for the Red Sox farm system. As he and Pennock exited the parent Red Sox organization, Specs Toporcer was stepping in to direct the farm system.

=== Philadelphia Phillies (1943-1954) ===
In December 1943, he moved to the Philadelphia Phillies shortly following the purchase of the National League team by R. R. M. Carpenter Jr. Carpenter's rebuilding strategy centered on securing young talent and expanding the farm system. Reardon was named the director of the Phillies' farm system by Herb Pennock, who had joined the organization as the new general manager. He was granted an annual salary of $12,500. A testimonial banquet was held at The Hotel Casey on February 17, 1944, to honor the newly appointed director. Mike McNally served as toastmaster. The event attracted 528 guests, then the largest function of its kind in Coal Region history.

During the transition point in his career, he was named the president of the Utica Blue Sox, a Phillies' farm club in Utica, New York.

He was elected as the vice president of the Eastern League, alongside its president Thomas H. Richardson, in November 1944. The position was honorary, carried no salary, and rotated among team presidents each year. He served for a one-year term until November 1945.

The Phillies had also acquired a franchise in the city of Bradford, Pennsylvania in 1944. In 1947, the farm director appointed Johnny Wise as business manager of the Bradford Phillies. Reardon managed the development of the Carbondale Pioneers in 1946, a franchise based in Carbondale, Pennsylvania. He appointed Barney Lutz to manage Carbondale's North Atlantic League franchise in 1948. By 1948, he oversaw 14 farm teams.

==== National League pennant ====
Reardon played a key role in developing the minor league affiliates that supplied the "Whiz Kids" during the 1950 Philadelphia Phillies season. The Philadelphia champions of 1950 benefitted heavily from the farm system when the club won its first National League pennant in 35 years.

His efforts contributed to the rise of players like Robin Roberts, Curt Simmons, and Richie Ashburn, among others.

He confirmed in February 1951 that the Phillies organization had reached a player-development agreement with the Grand Forks Chiefs of the Northern League. In October 1951, he announced that the Phillies would terminate their Bradford franchise in the PONY League due to significant financial losses. A committee of local businessmen and the mayor of Bradford persuaded him to operate the club for one additional season. By October 1952, the franchise was discontinued after nine years and offered to a local ownership group. The Phillies' farm director completed a franchise transfer that allowed the Bradford Community Baseball Club, Inc., to obtain the team for the 1953 season.

While in Philadelphia, he served as a host during the 1952 Major League Baseball All-Star Game in July 1952.

==== Resignation ====
He resigned as the director of the Phillies' farm system on November 13, 1954, after 11 years with the National League team. During his administration as farm director, he recruited Joe Lonnett, Richie Ashburn, Curt Simmons, Robin Roberts, Ed Bouchee, Jack Sanford, Granny Hamner, Willie Jones, Harry Anderson, Bob Bowman, Stan Lopata, Turk Farrell, Ted Kazanski, Jack Meyer, Bob Miller, Seth Morehead, Don Cardwell, and Marv Blaylock.

=== Syracuse Chiefs (1955-1957) ===
Following his resignation, he set out to fulfill his goal of owning a minor league baseball team. On December 19, 1955, he bought an Eastern League franchise in Elmira, New York and named Glenn McQuillen as the manager for the 1956 season. In February 1956, he announced the team's move from Elmira to Syracuse, New York, due to higher attendance and advertisement potential. He served as both president and general manager of the independently operated club, with Eddie Collins Jr. as vice president and his wife, Mary G. Reardon, as the treasurer. He secured the team's home field at MacArthur Stadium. Their lone season in Syracuse combined low attendance, a fifth-place finish, and three managerial replacements. He invested around $60,000 into the failed venture of the Syracuse Chiefs before he was bought out by the Boston Red Sox in 1957.

He briefly scouted for the Cleveland Indians during the 1950s.

Between the 1940s and 1960s, he was often noted in the "Hatchin' 'Em Out" column and other articles written by Chic Feldman, sports editor of The Scrantionian and The Scranton Tribune.

=== Post-baseball career ===
He exited professional baseball to begin a career in real estate. In the 1960s, he established himself as a realtor in Scranton, Pennsylvania.

== Death ==
Reardon died on June 24, 1982, at Community Medical Center in Scranton, Pennsylvania, United States, at 76 years old. He was interred at Scranton's Cathedral Cemetery.
