= Reardon =

Reardon is a surname of Irish Gaelic origin. It is an anglicisation of the modern Irish Gaelic Ó Ríordáin, which itself in turn derived from the original 'Ó Ríoghbhardáin', meaning royal bard (from the Irish Gaelic words, rí = king, and the diminutive form of bard). Notable people with the surname include:

- Ann Reardon (born 1975), known online as "How to Cook That", Australian YouTube personality
- Beans Reardon (1897–1984), American umpire in Major League Baseball
- Bill Reardon (born 1941), American politician and educator
- Casper Reardon (1907–1941), classical and later jazz harpist
- David Reardon, American director of the Elliot Institute
- Dom Reardon, British comics artist (2000AD)
- Donna Reardon, Canadian politician and mayor of Saint John, NB
- Eoin Reardon, Irish influencer
- Jack Reardon (rugby league) (1914–1991), Australian rugby league footballer and writer
- Jeff Reardon (born 1955), American baseball relief pitcher
- Jim Reardon (born 1965), director and storyboard consultant (The Simpsons)
- Jimmy Reardon (1925–2019), Irish Olympic sprinter
- Joe Reardon (1906–1982), American baseball executive
- John Reardon (born 1975), Canadian actor and former college football player
- John Reardon (baritone) (1930–1988), American baritone and actor
- Judy Reardon, American politician
- Julie Reardon (born 1958), Australian judoka
- Ken Reardon (1921–2008), Canadian professional ice hockey player
- Kerry Reardon (born 1949), American football player
- Mara Candelaria Reardon, American politician and representative (Indiana Democrats)
- Mary A. Reardon (1912–2002), American Catholic liturgical artist
- Michael Reardon (climber) (1965–2007), American professional free solo climber, filmmaker, motivational speaker and writer
- Michael Reardon (architect), English architect, historic building consultant, and interior designer
- Michael Reardon (activist) (1876–1945), New Zealand political activist
- Nathan Reardon (born 1984), Australian professional cricketer
- Paul Reardon (1909–1988), Justice of the Massachusetts Supreme Judicial Court
- Phil Reardon (1883–1920), American professional baseball player
- Ray Reardon (1932–2024), Welsh snooker player
- Rosanna Reardon, American YouTube personality, businesswoman, actress, and television personality known as Rosanna Pansino.
- Sean Reardon, American sociologist
- Steve Reardon (born 1971), Australian rugby league player
- Stuart Reardon (born 1981), English rugby league player
- Tara Reardon, American politician
- Terry Reardon (1919–1993), Canadian professional ice hockey player
- Thomas Reardon (born 1969), American computational neuroscientist and entrepreneur, creator of Internet Explorer
- William Reardon Smith (1856–1935), British shipowner

== See also ==
- Reardon Smith baronets, a title in the Baronetage of the United Kingdom
