= SpanishDict =

Spanish dictionary and learning website

- An example of SpanishDict's dictionary feature in April 2023
- Available in: English Spanish
- Founded: 1999; 27 years ago
- Area served: Worldwide
- Owner: Chris Cummings
- Founders: Chris Cummings; Jeremy Cummings
- Industry: Online education
- Services: Spanish and English conjugation, translation, and learning.
- Registration: Optional (Note: One can use SpanishDict's dictionary/word translation features without an account, but registration is required for its language learning feature.)
- Current status: Online
- Native client(s) on: Android, iOS, iPadOS

SpanishDict is a Spanish-American English reference, learning website, and mobile application. The website and mobile application feature a Spanish-American English dictionary and translator, verb conjugation tables, pronunciation videos, and language lessons. SpanishDict is managed by Curiosity Media.

SpanishDict was founded by Chris Cummings and Jeremy Cummings in 1999. Chris Cummings, took over as CEO in 2007 while he was studying for degrees Juris Doctor and Master of Business Administration at Harvard University.

According to Fast Company, SpanishDict was being accessed by over 9 million users per month in 2013. In 2014, The Washington Post reported that SpanishDict reached over 12 million users per month. During the COVID-19 pandemic, SpanishDict and its accompanying product for English learners, inglés.com, reached over 100 million people annually.

SpanishDict is often cited as a resource in academic journal articles in the fields of language acquisition and linguistics.

In 2022, Curiosity Media was acquired by IXL Learning.

SpanishDict was the host of a writing competition #LoveSpanish, in which the participants wrote about why they love the language in time with the Hispanic Heritage Month. The results were announced in 2014.

In 2024, FrenchDictionary.com, the French version of SpanishDict, came out with similar features.
