= Willie Reardon Smith =

British shipowner (1887–1950)

Sir Willie Reardon-Smith, 2nd Baronet (26 May 1887 – 24 November 1950), was a 20th-century British shipowner.

== Life ==
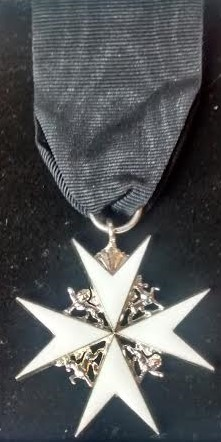
OStJ decoration

The elder son of Sir William Reardon Smith, 1st Baronet, and his wife Ellen Hamlyn (1857–1939), he assumed the additional surname of Reardon by Deed Poll in 1929. Reardon-Smith succeeded his father as owner of the South Wales shipping company Reardon Smith Line, and served as a justice of the peace for Glamorgan.

A director of Cardiff Docks, the London Assurance Company and many shipping companies, Sir Willie served as High Sheriff of Glamorgan (1946/47), being appointed OStJ and was a Trustee of the National Museum of Wales.

== Family ==
Sir Willie married Elizabeth Wakely in 1910, having four sons and a daughter, including Major Sir William Reardon-Smith, 3rd Baronet (1911–1995), late 34th LAA Regt (TA), who succeeded him in the baronetcy.

== See also ==
- Reardon-Smith baronets

Baronetage of the United Kingdom
Preceded by William Reardon Smith	Baronet (of Appledore); 1935–1950	Succeeded by William Reardon-Smith
