= Reardon Smith baronets =

Baronetcy in the Baronetage of the United Kingdom

The Smith, later Reardon-Smith Baronetcy, of Appledore in Devon, is a title in the Baronetage of the United Kingdom. It was created on 1 July 1920 for the shipowner and coal exporter William Smith. The second baronet assumed in 1929 by deed poll the additional surname of Reardon.

== Smith, later Reardon-Smith baronets, of Appledore (1920) ==
- Sir William Reardon Smith, 1st Baronet (1856–1935)
- Sir Willie Reardon-Smith, 2nd Baronet (1887–1950)
- Sir William Reardon Reardon-Smith, 3rd Baronet (1911–1995)
- Sir (William) Antony John Reardon-Smith, 4th Baronet (1937–2022)
- Sir William Nicolas Henry Reardon Smith, 5th Baronet (born 1963)

The heir presumptive is the present baronet's brother Giles Antony James Reardon-Smith (born 1968), whose heir-in-line is his son Jack Charles Gibson Reardon-Smith (born 2001).
