= National Hispanic Heritage Month =

Cultural recognition month in the US

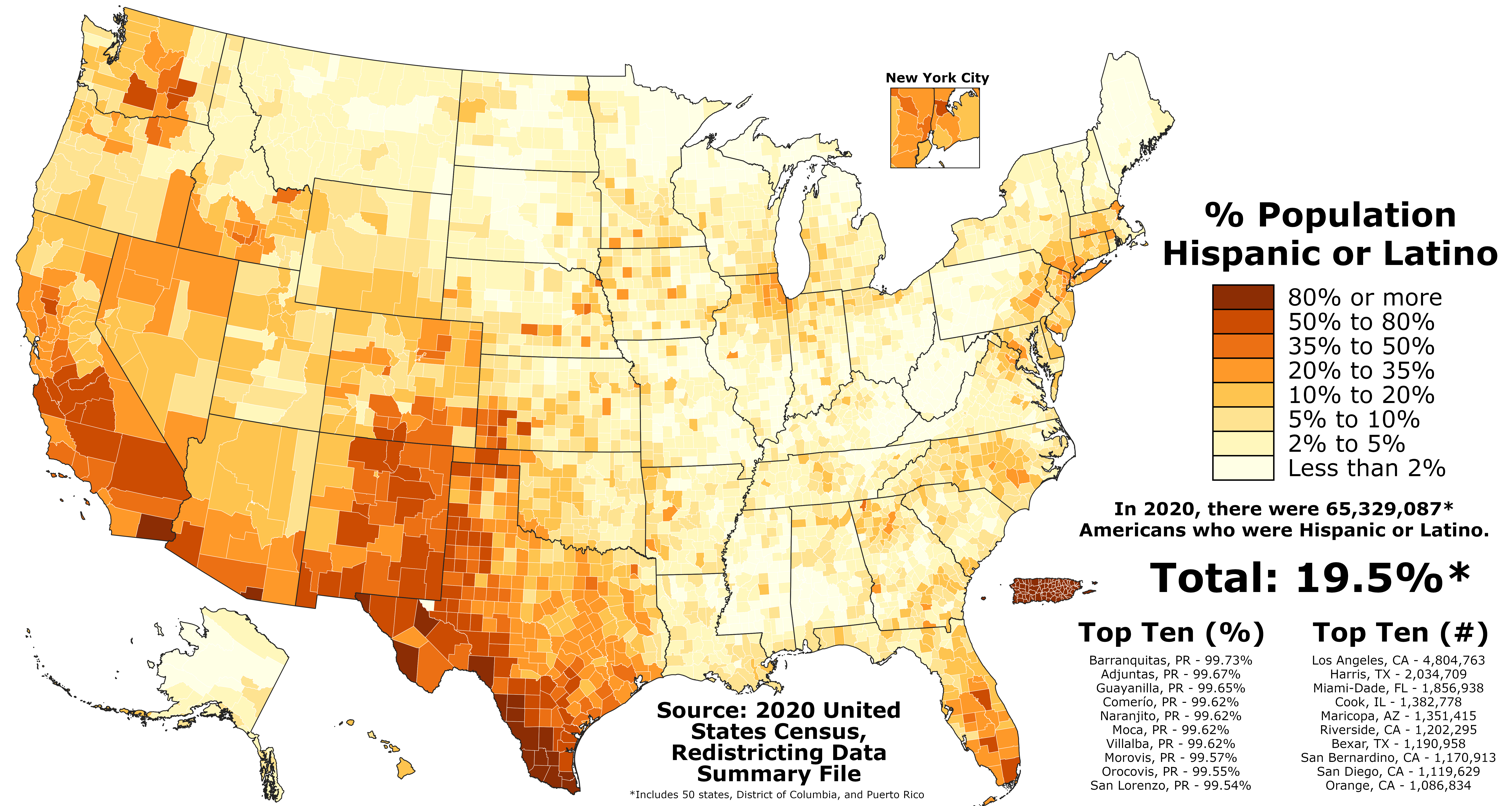
Proportion of Hispanics and Latinos in each county of the United according to the United States Census in 2020

National Hispanic Heritage Month (Spanish: Mes nacional de la herencia hispana) is annually observed from September 15 to October 15 in the United States for recognizing the contributions and influence of Hispanic culture to the nation's achievements, culture, and history.

== History ==
National Hispanic Heritage Week was established by legislation sponsored by Rep. George Brown Jr. of Los Angeles and signed into law by President Lyndon Johnson in 1968, taking place on the week including both September 15 and 16. In 1988, the commemorative week was expanded to a month (September 15 to October 15) by legislation sponsored by Rep. Esteban Torres (D–CA), amended by Senator Paul Simon, and signed into law by President Ronald Reagan. September 15 was chosen as the starting point for the commemoration because it is the anniversary of the Cry of Dolores (early morning, 16 September 1810), which marked the start of the Mexican War of Independence and thus resulted (in 1821) in independence for the New Spain Colony (now Mexico and the Central American nations of Guatemala, El Salvador, Costa Rica, Honduras, and Nicaragua) which became the Federal Republic of Central America.

The 30-day period also includes many dates of importance in the Hispanic community: Costa Rica, El Salvador, Guatemala, Honduras, and Nicaragua celebrate their anniversary of independence on September 15; Mexico commemorates its independence on September 16; Chile commemorates its independence on September 18; and the celebration of Columbus Day or Día de la Raza.

Hispanic Heritage Week was first proclaimed by President Johnson in 1968 in Presidential Proclamation 3869. Presidents Nixon, Ford, Carter, and Reagan gave annual proclamations for Hispanic Heritage Week between 1969 and 1988. National Hispanic Heritage Month was first proclaimed by President George H. W. Bush on September 14, 1989, in Presidential Proclamation 6021. Since 1989, all Presidents have given a Presidential Proclamation to mark Hispanic Heritage Month.

In February 2025, Google announced that Hispanic Heritage Month would no longer be highlighted by default on Google Calendar, arguing that it was no longer "scalable or sustainable" to continue adding the growing number of national and international "cultural moments" manually to its calendars.

== Military commemorations ==
National Hispanic Heritage Month is a time for the U.S. Military to honor both fallen and still-active Hispanic Americans who served in the armed forces. Sixty-one people of Hispanic heritage have been awarded the Medal of Honor, two were presented to members of the Navy, 13 to members of the U.S. Marine Corps, and 46 to members of the U.S. Army.

During the month, the U.S. Army commemorates the longstanding and remarkable contributions that Hispanics have made in building and defending the nation. As of September 2018, 136,000 Hispanic soldiers serve, composing 13.8 percent of the Army. According to the official Army website, the goal during Hispanic Heritage Month is to celebrate the diverse and inclusive environment of the U.S. Army. Through coordinated efforts throughout the Army, this observance will be used to inform Army audiences and celebrate the contributions of Hispanic soldiers, civilians, and their families. The representation of Hispanic Americans on active duty has increased by 10 percentage points during the past 30 years. In 1985, it was three percent, and by 2016 it was 13.7 percent.

The U.S. Navy celebrates Hispanic Heritage Month by honoring sailors of Hispanic heritage whose military service dates back to the Civil War. As of June 2018, approximately 59,000 active and reserve sailors of Hispanic heritage serve in the U.S. Navy and Marines.

== Annual events ==
Established in 2013 by the Fayetteville Chamber of Commerce, the annual Northwest Arkansas Hispanic Heritage Festival is held in Fayetteville, Arkansas.

The El Barrio Latin Jazz Festival in The Bronx, New York City is held annually in September to coincide with Hispanic Heritage Month.

The Smithsonian Institution hosts Hispanic Heritage Month events in Washington, D.C. One event is the Zoo Fiesta. In 2018, the Smithsonian National Museum of the American Indian hosted the Realm of the Jaguar, a series of performances featuring dances of Bolivia, Mexico and Guatemala, in addition to mask making and traditional and contemporary ceramics."

The Hispanic Family Festival is held annually at Springdale Park in Springdale, Holyoke, Massachusetts.

The Official Latino Short Film Festival began in 2015.

The Hispanic Star, a platform created by the We Are All Human Foundation, hosted a virtual Hispanic Heritage Month kick-off in 2020 featuring artists such as Residente and Fonseca, as well as civic and corporate leaders. The program engaged leaders to discuss Hispanic heritage and pride, the community's reality and Hispanic success stories. The organization also published a toolkit developed to help individuals and organizations join in the celebration.

== Bibliography ==
- Weber, David J. (1992). The Spanish Frontier in North America. New Haven: Yale University Press. ISBN 0-300-05198-0.
- Fernández-Shaw, Carlos M. (1987). La Presencia Española en Los Estados Unidos. Madrid: Instituto de Cooperación Iberoamericana. ISBN 0-8160-2314-X.
- McDermott, John Francis (1974). The Spanish in the Mississippi Valley 1762-1804. Urbana, IL: University of Illinois Press. ISBN 0-252-00269-5.
- Diaz Soto, Lourdes (2011). Latina/o Hope. Springer Netherlands, Dordrecht: Springer Science & Business Media B.V. ISBN 978-9400735224.
- Cortes, Carlos (2013). Multicultural America: A Multimedia Encyclopedia. United States, California: SAGE Publications, Inc. ISBN 9781452216836.
- Arredondo, Patricia (2018). Latinx Immigrants: Transcending Acculturation and Xenophobia. Springer International Publishing. ISBN 978-3-319-95737-1.
