= Valley Arena Gardens =

Arena in Massachusetts

- The Old Gas House

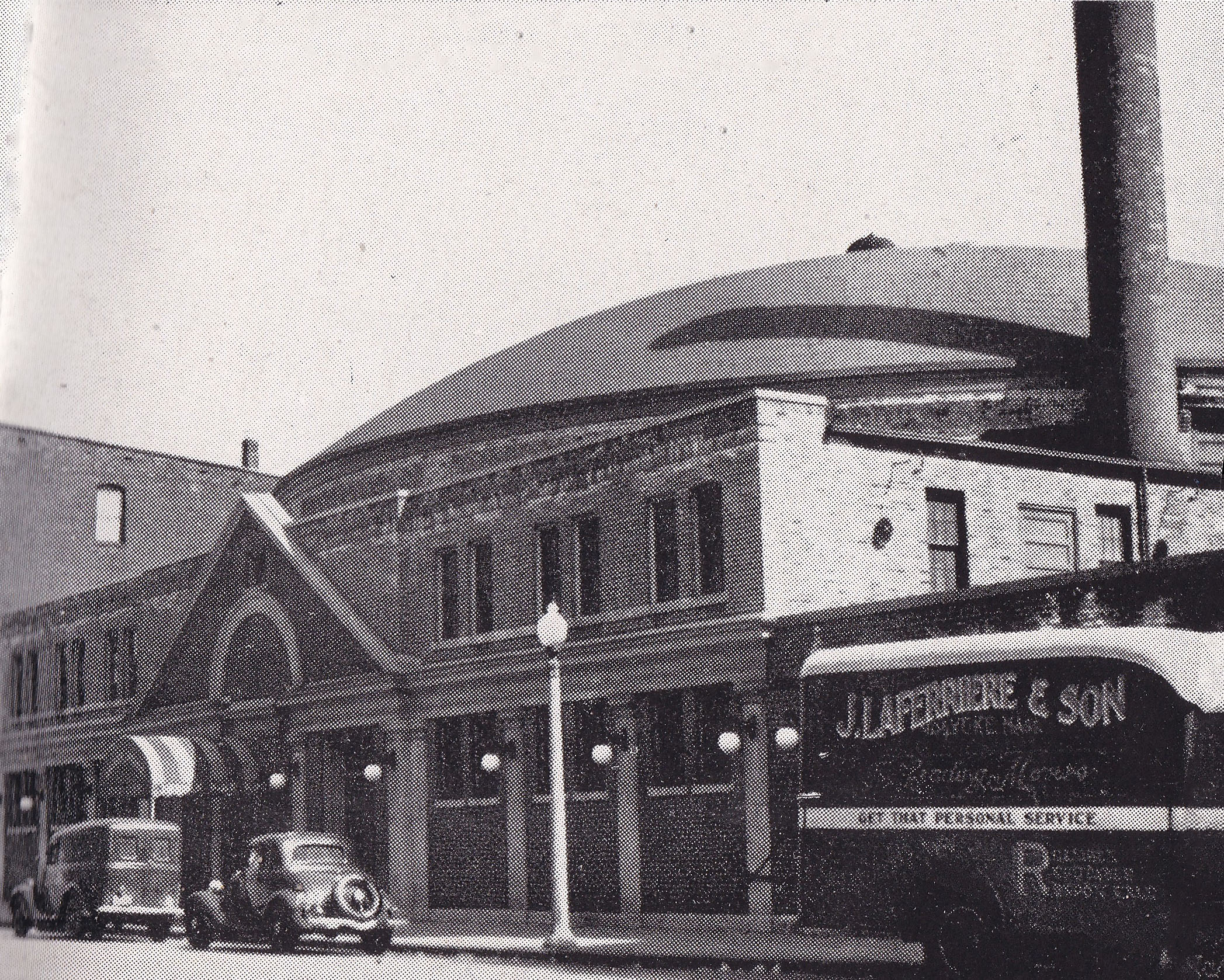
- The Arena after its reopening in 1944, which added a new dome and expansion
- Interactive map of Valley Arena Gardens
- Former names: Holyoke City Gas Works
- Address: 560 S Bridge Street
- Location: Holyoke, Massachusetts
- Capacity: 1,600–4,000 (Note: Accounts vary; a 1957 Sports Illustrated account describes it as a club seating only 1,600 persons, whereas the highest number given by the Republican in 1926 places it at 2900 seats; with standing room accommodating an estimated 4000 attendants. It is unclear if the difference was due to the subsequent reconstruction of the stadium or changes in building code after the first two fires.)

Construction
- Built: 1884; 1926 (converted to arena)
- Opened: 1926
- Renovated: 1944, 1953
- Closed: 1960
- Demolished: 1964
- Architect: Oscar Beauchemin (Note: Designer of arena as gasholder conversion; 1884 architect of original gasholder unknown, subsequent architects designing modifications of 1944, 1953 rebuilds unknown.)

The Valley Arena Gardens, most commonly referred to as the Valley Arena, was a sporting and entertainment venue in Holyoke, Massachusetts, best known for hosting weekly boxing matches which included Rocky Marciano's debut professional fight. Though best known for its history as a boxing venue, the Valley Arena also hosted wrestling, basketball, roller hockey, miniature golf and featured its own restaurant. As a nightclub and theatre in the round venue it also hosted an array of vaudeville acts such as The Three Stooges and Bela Lugosi, as well as renowned musicians including Count Basie, Duke Ellington, The Ink Spots, The Dorsey Brothers, The Glenn Miller Orchestra, Sarah Vaughan, and The Temptations. In an interview with Woody Herman and band alumni, Jack Dulong, saxophonist and member of Herman's "Third Herd", described it as "an 'institution' for big bands."

Plagued by several fires, at least one of which was from suspected arson, as well as a decline in attendance with the emergence of television, the venue was closed following the 3rd such fire on May 12, 1960. After considerable delay, the building was ultimately demolished in August 1964.

Today the space where it once stood is occupied by the Valley Arena Park, a small recreational green space managed by the city.

== History ==
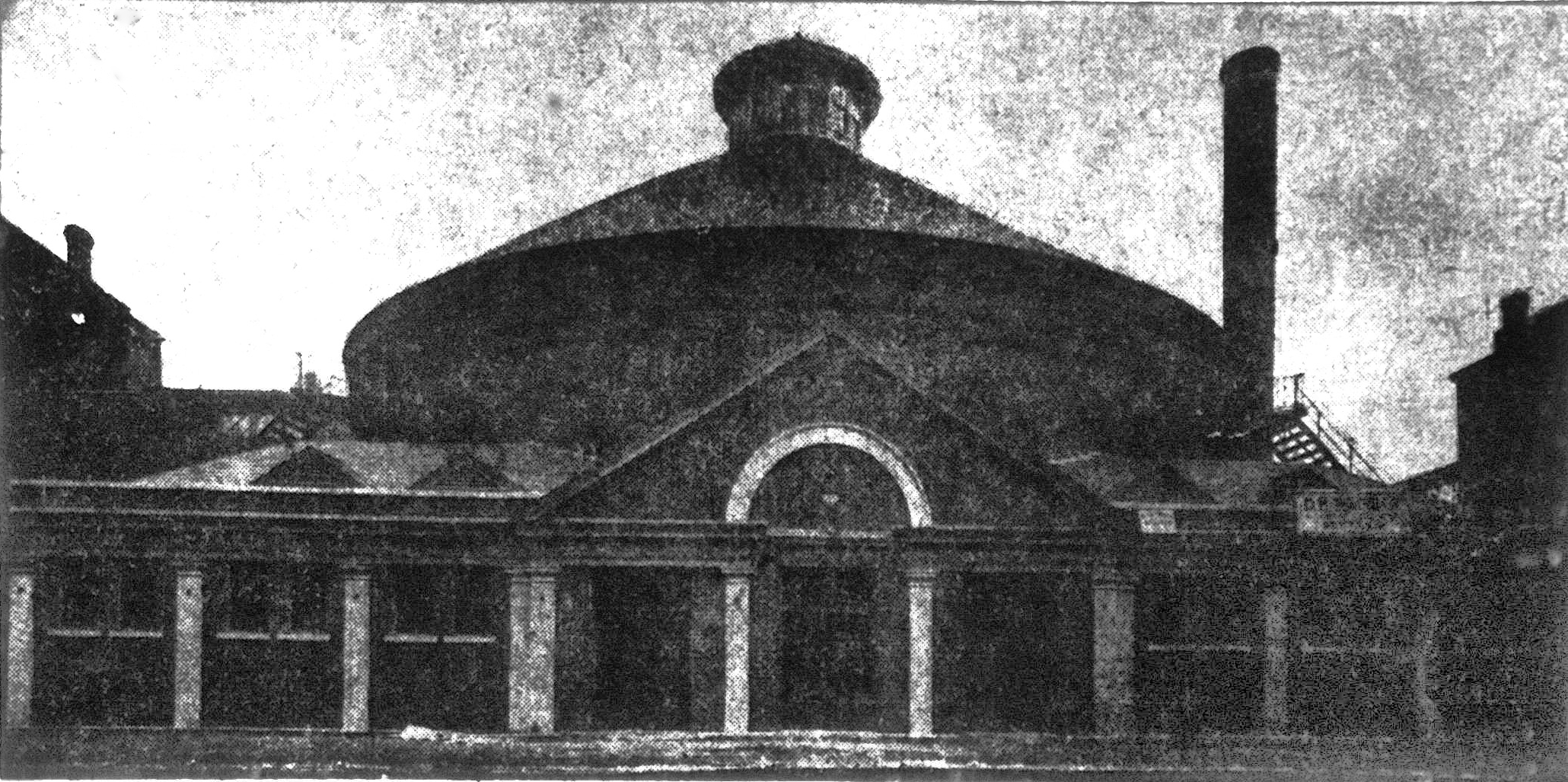
Front facade of the Arena at its opening, January 1926

Prior to its permanent home in the gashouse, the Valley Arena was first established in a space at 560-66 Main Street in 1916 by Homer Rainault, and his business partner Amedee F. Goulet, as a gym. The two had previously run a cigar counter and billiard academy for 23 years in the same neighborhood, and by the time they opened the Valley Arena, Rainault was a promoter who had previously organized fights in Hartford, Troy, and West Springfield. Rainault's career as a promoter would really begin after 1920, when the Commonwealth officially legalized boxing, theretofore an underground sport. On August 11, 1925, Valley Arena, Inc. was formally incorporated, and by October 23, 1925, the company had purchased an old brick gasholder house from the City of Holyoke's municipal gas works. The sale at the time was listed in the register of deeds as a land sale as the gasholder house had been previously decommissioned in 1915, was briefly considered as a site for a new public bathhouse, but had remained unoccupied since. After 3 months of construction, the new converted Valley Arena Gardens debuted with their first fight on February 8, 1926 with a match between one "Petey" Mack and Leo "Kid" Roy.

On June 13, 1943, at approximately 2am, the first of three fires in the Arena's history broke out. An hour after owner Homer Rainault left the building, local patrolmen reported seeing flames billowing out of the building. Starting on the first floor and filling all reaches, the fire caused between an estimated $150,000–$200,000 in damage (approx. $2.1 to 2.5 million in 2017 USD). The building was insured however, but only for $100,000; in the weeks following the fire, owner Homer Rainault expressed doubts over rebuilding. Ultimately Rainault decided to rebuild, and used the Holyoke War Memorial Building as a music venue for the remainder of the year, hosting a number of artists, including The Ink Spots, during this time. Fights continued at a local club in Springfield and by August of that year, Rainault had put everything in place to rebuild. Eight months after the devastating fire, the venue reopened on February 28, 1944 with a 10 round match between bantamweight champion Louis Salica and one Mario Colon, a rising star from Mexico.

In 1944, the Arena's founder Homer Rainault died unexpectedly from a cerebral hemorrhage at the age of 58; by that time he had gained a reputation as a promoter for giving many nationally famous boxers their start in the Connecticut Valley. The board of directors ultimately voted for his nephew, Oreal D. Rainault to take his place. Rainault would eventually sell the venue in 1952 to two businessmen, Jack and Ralph Kane of Norfolk, Virginia; making it clear that this sale was only partial as he retained stock in the company.

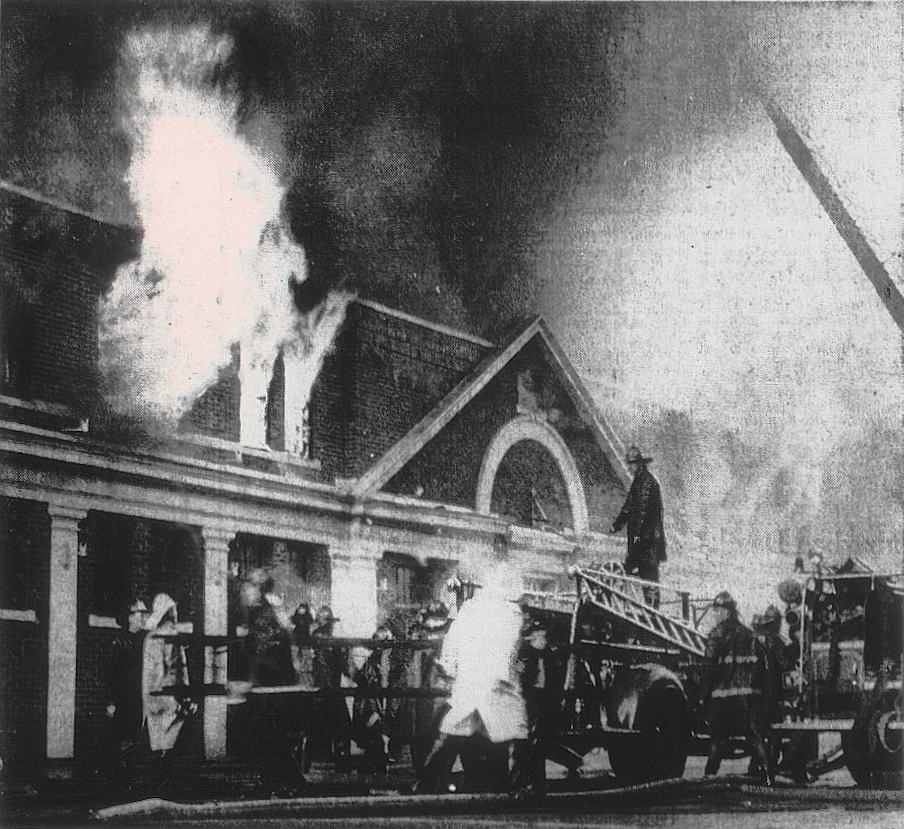
The Holyoke Fire Dept. fighting the Arena's final fire on May 12, 1960; from the front page of the Springfield Union.

Even before the second fire, the venue had begun to see a decline in its attendance for boxing matches as television gained popularity while stage shows and events that relied on audience attendance saw shrinking numbers across the country. On November 11, 1952, the boxing matchmaker, Joe Di Maria, resigned due to dwindling crowds that season. In contrast with its boxing, by the end of 1952, concerns had been raised by Holyoke police and fire departments about overcrowding at the venue's night club. On December 23, the police and fire chiefs held a conference stating that maximum capacities would be discussed with and enforced by the Arena's management, denying rumors that the venue was being given a pass.

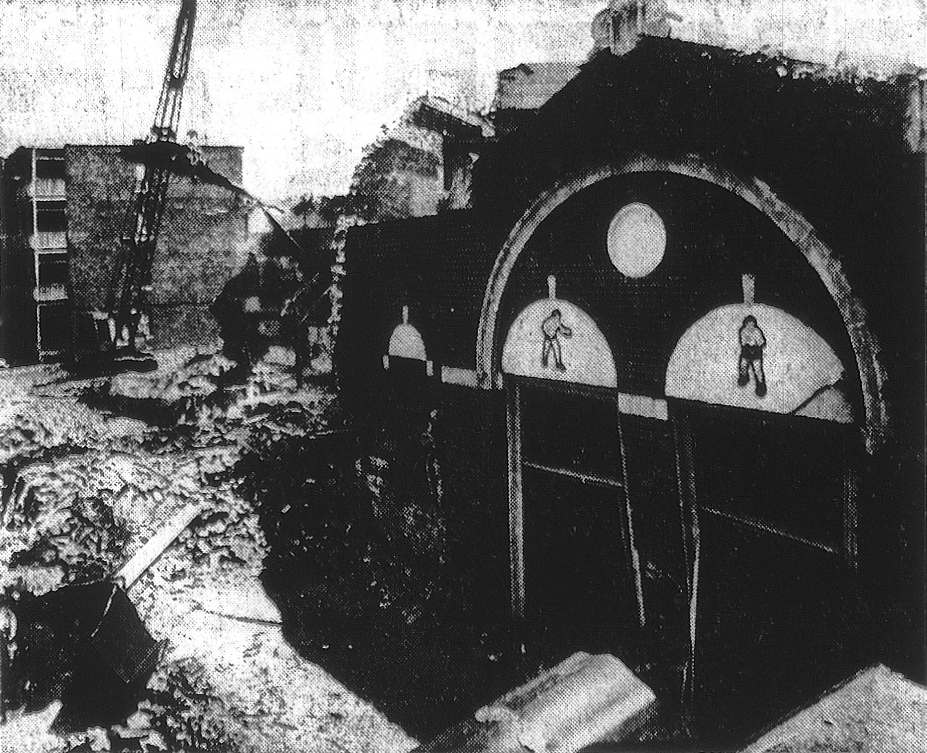
Mosaics of boxers can be seen above the doors of the inner entrance, as the building's burnt-out ruins were razed.

Only three days after that press conference, on December 26, 1952, the second started in the Circus Lounge of that building in the early hours of the morning. Future Holyoke fire chief William W. Mahoney, then a member of one of the companies which fought the fire, later went on to describe it as "one of the most vicious fires for smoke conditions [he'd] ever seen," severe enough that an eye doctor had to set up a first aid station at the scene. The three-alarm fire quickly spread, and led to tenants across South Holyoke being roused from their beds in case of a possible evacuation. In total the fire caused an estimated $250,000 of damages (approx. $2.3 million in 2018 USD), and injured 6 firefighters. The fire had begun in the basement, and with the premises flooded for several days, firefighters were not immediately able to determine its cause. While formal inquests were made and hours of testimony given by the owners and multiple employees under oath, conflicting accounts were found and the fire was deemed "of unknown but suspicious origin" by the state police captain tasked with its investigation.

While the city had allowed boxing to continue in the Holyoke War Memorial building during the previous fire, this was not the case the second time. Before Jack Kane or anyone else associated with the arena could approach the War Memorial Commission, their chairman Thomas Epstein introduced a motion, passed unanimously, opposing the use of the hall for wrestling or boxing matches. The venue would reopen following its last reconstruction, on September 28, 1953.

After the final fire on May 12, 1960, Oreal Rainault elected not to not attempt rebuilding the venue. Following a prolonged period where the burnt-out ruins of the building sat vacant, the Valley Arena Gardens were demolished throughout the month of August, 1964.

=== Boxing ===
While it hosted many well known musicians and other sporting events, the Arena was best remembered as a boxing venue, where many champions across multiple weight classes got their start in their early professional careers. Among the many other household names who would fight in the ring, were Beau Jack, Willie Pep, Kid Kaplan, Lou Ambers, Billy Petrolle, Jack Delaney, Frankie Genaro, Sandy Saddler, Rocky Graziano, Ike Williams, and Ernie Schaaf. Jersey Joe Walcott, best known as the oldest man to ever win the world heavyweight championship title at the age of 37 (prior to George Foreman's win at 45 in 1994), also fought in the Arena for an exhibition match.

Within a decade of opening, the Arena had gained such prominence in the national boxing scene by the 1930s that Holyoke news held a regular column in the boxing magazine The Ring. More than two decades after the venue had burnt down, World Featherweight Champion Willie Pep was quoted as saying "it was a breeding place...anybody who was anybody boxed there." One Mike Cipriano, a New York promoter who managed Jake LaMotta and Harry LaSane, described it as "a little Madison Square Garden...the arena was known from coast to coast—they'd sell out almost every week...it was nothing for a bunch of us to pile into a car and head for Holyoke...If you didn't fight in Holyoke, you weren't a fighter" The venue was known for having raucous crowds, notably on April 26, 1954, when a boxer, Howard Saligny of New York, made low blows against one Gerry Tessier of Springfield, within minutes the ringside spectators had poured into the ring punching and kicking Saligny to the ground; police eventually restored order.

The Arena hosted the first match in the continental United States of Sixto Escobar, the first Puerto Rican to win a world title. On May 7, 1934, Escobar, a bantamweight, defeated bantamweight contender and Canadian flyweight champion Bobby Leitham, in a fight that made headlines in local papers and was described as a "dramatic upset". The match of 10 rounds was ended abruptly in the seventh, when a referee realized the extent to which Leitham's left eye had been hemorrhaged by a sharp right overhand which had also left a gash across his cheek. Escobar was declared winner of the match by technical knockout.

The Arena hosted Rocky Marciano's professional debut in the ring, as a 4-round opener against Holyoke native Lee (real name Leslie V.) Epperson on St. Patrick's Day, March 17, 1947. In the first professional bout of his career the Brockton native, then stationed in the air force at Westover, was billed as "Rocky Mackianno of Westover Field" or "Rocky Mac" for short. Having been set up for the opening fight by a friend who had known Rainault, Marciano managed to hold on for the first two rounds as Epperson landed several blows as his own missed. The match came to an abrupt end however, 42 seconds into the third round when Marciano landed a sharp right uppercut, knocking his opponent through the ropes and out of the ring. Because the fight predated Marciano's continuous professional career by about a year, and he had been billed under a slightly different name, it remained entirely obscure until later in the heavyweight's career. After retiring, Marciano would make a second appearance at the venue a decade later, serving as a referee. Brought on at the invitation of boxing promoter Sam Silverman, it would be billed as his "Eastern Debut" in such a capacity- his only previous referee role being at a venue in New Orleans.

=== Music ===
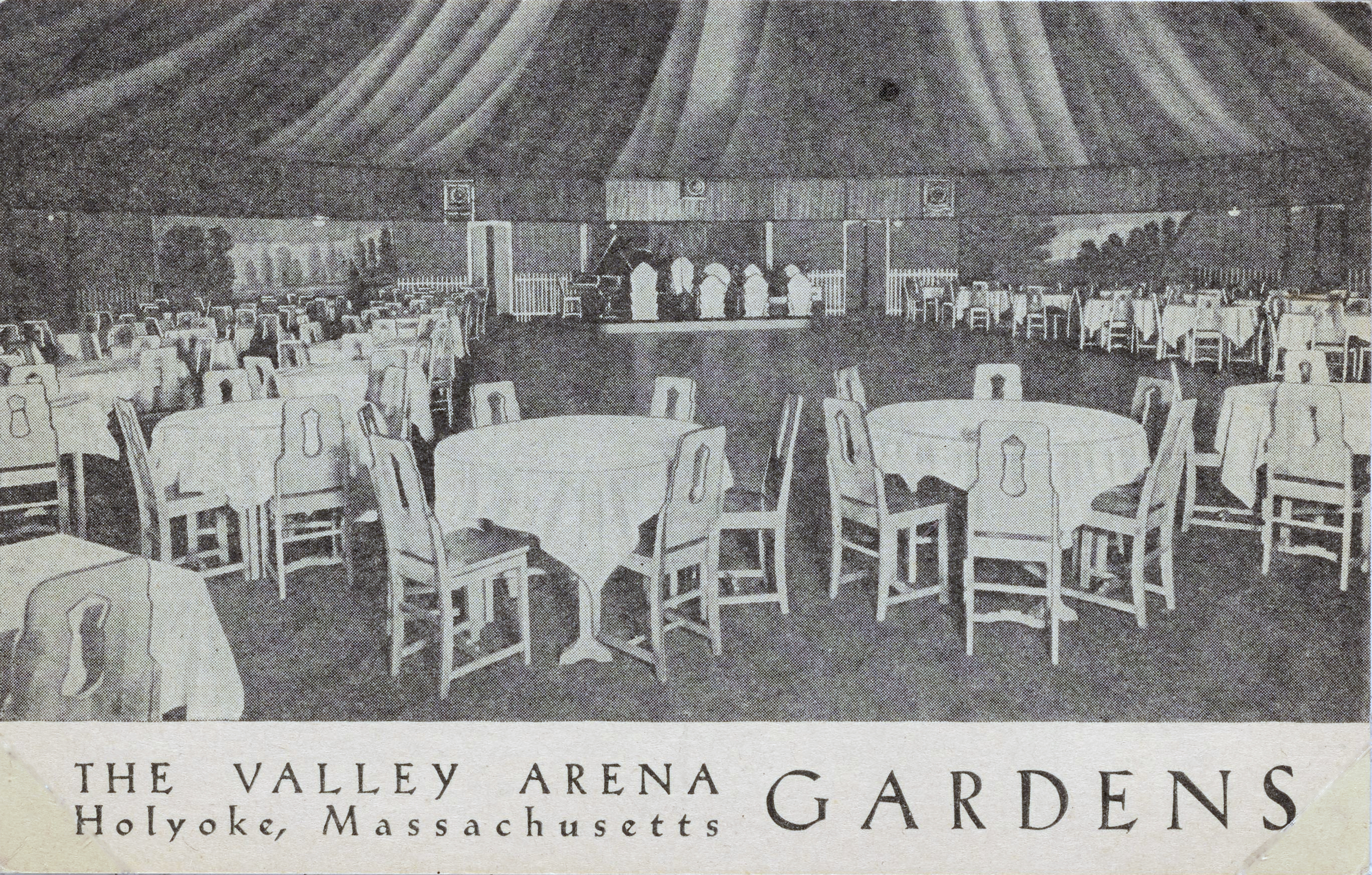
The Indian Pine Room at the Valley Arena Gardens, c. 1944-1950

Even as its boxing lineups struggled to draw crowds in the 1950s, the venue continued to promote weekly music performances drawing from stars who'd gained popularity through the growing mediums of radio and television; with this one featuring Frances Langford, Cab Calloway, Tommy Reynolds.

Throughout nearly the entirety of its existence the Arena booked many famous musicians for its night club, which featured its own in-house orchestra. Spanning generations, it hosted many famous musicians across several genres, including jazz, blues, big band, country, soul, and rock & roll with such names as- Count Basie, Duke Ellington, Wee Bonnie Baker, The Dorsey Brothers, The Ink Spots, Lionel Hampton, Roy Rogers, The Glenn Miller Orchestra, Sarah Vaughan, The Temptations, Shep Fields, and Jack Teagarden.

The venue was known both as a regular stop for big band musicians, and an especially arduous gig for them other among acts. In his memoirs, Gene Bockey, a saxophonist in Tommy Dorsey's band called it "the hell-hole of all name bands". In a 1986 interview, Woody Herman alumni Jack E. DuLong, another saxophonist, described it as "that infamous job that all bands hated, that all-day thing at the Holyoke Arena...It was Sunday, and you'd get in early in the morning, and rehearse perhaps a dozen acts and play three shows; one in the afternoon and two in the evening. You would start rehearsing in the morning without even an hour's sleep. It was a theater-in-the-round type thing, an 'institution' for big bands. After there we went into Brooklyn, New York, for a theater engagement."

This was a common theme for bands that played the Arena. In his 2008 memoir, Don't Bury Me in My Tuxedo, Daryl "Flea" Campbell, best known as one of the earliest trumpet players to tour with Tommy Dorsey's act, expanded on this, describing his time there with Charlie Spivak's band:

"Whenever we played a string of one-nighters in New England, we always seemed to wind up at the Holyoke arena... after traveling all night to get there. We never checked in a hotel in Holyoke but always continued to New York after the job...After driving all night, we would have a 10:00 a.m. rehearsal...The shows started about noon and wound up around 11:00 p.m. It was a long day. The balcony ran around the arena in a complete circle...The show better be good, or you became a target! There were four bars in the arena, which we visited between each show, so by 11:00 p.m., we were feeling pretty good. It was 150 miles from Holyoke to New York City, and as I said before, there were no interstates or thruways, just two-lane roads. We got the bus packed by eleven thirty..."

=== Other ===
The Arena also served as a venue for regular vaudeville shows as well, and several known stage actors including noted impersonator Larry Blake, and Bela Lugosi, of Dracula fame. In 1942, the venue found itself at the center of a political controversy when the mayor of Holyoke at that time, Henry J. Toepfert instituted a ban on all vaudeville acts on Sundays, building on previous Massachusetts blue laws that prevented dancing or the use of "grotesque" costumes on Sundays. The Arena had however already booked several such acts for Sundays from prior contracts, and was allowed by the city to continue them, despite protest from other venues in the city.

The Arena was also host to a number of well-known comedians. On three occasions, October 5, 1947, November 23, 1947 and April 30, 1950, The Three Stooges, Moe, Larry, and Shemp, gave performances at the venue. On an unknown date in the summer of 1950, comedian Lenny Bruce reportedly did a set. Comic Jerry Colonna would also perform at the Arena in 1946 and briefly made news when Oreal Rainault sued him for a second show at Riverside Park in Agawam. A prior contract had stipulated he not perform at any venue within 21 miles for 21 days before or after their booked show. While a temporary injunction was granted, it was ultimately dismissed.

Among other early sporting events hosted at the Arena, the venue also served as the home for the local amateur basketball league's "All-Valley Team", which included at least two players who had been invited to play in the American Basketball League. Wrestling was also a common event at the venue, with such names as Arnold Skaaland, Angelo Savoldi, Chief Don Eagle, and Bull Curry. The Fabulous Moolah made her New England debut at the Arena under the name June Ellison on June 25, 1949. Hans Mortier, billed as Tarzan Zorro, made his New England debut at the Arena on October 8, 1952.

== Valley Arena Park ==
The land where the venue once stood was sold to the city by the Rainault family in 1968 and was converted initially into space for a playground Within a year's time these plans were expanded into a playground and wading pool with bathhouse, with construction beginning in 1969. The park reopened in 1970. Despite being the site of a former gasworks, a comprehensive environmental assessment taken from 2004 through 2005 of the soils at the site found no contamination of the site inconsistent with background noise typically found in urban soils.

== See also ==
- Rhode Island Auditorium, a similar venue of the era, based in Providence
