= Dan Parker (sportswriter) =

American sportswriter (1893–1967)

- Born: Daniel Francis Parker; July 1, 1893; Waterbury, Connecticut, U.S.
- Died: May 20, 1967 (aged 73); Waterbury, Connecticut, U.S.
- Other names: The Connecticut Crusader
- Occupation: Sportswriter
- Years active: 1913-1963
- Organization(s): The Waterbury American; The New York Daily Mirror; New York Journal-American
- Known for: His work for The New York Daily Mirror
- Honors: International Boxing Hall of Fame (1996)

Dan Parker (July 1, 1893 – May 20, 1967) was an American sportswriter and columnist who worked for The New York Daily Mirror from 1926 to 1963.

== Early life and education ==
Daniel Francis Parker was born on July 1, 1893, in Waterbury, Connecticut, United States.

He went to Crosby High School in his hometown.

== Career ==
=== The Waterbury American ===
Parker began his newspaper career at The Waterbury American, serving as a reporter, city editor, and sportswriter from 1913 until 1924.

=== The New York Daily Mirror ===
He joined The New York Daily Mirror in 1924 as a baseball correspondent, working under sports editor Gene Fowler before taking over his role. He began serving as sports editor and columnist for The New York Daily Mirror in 1926. He established a sports column called "Dan Parker's Broadway Bugle".

The beginnings of Parker's sportswriting in the 1930s coincided with stars like Jack Dempsey, Babe Ruth, Bobby Jones, and Bill Tilden. By 1943, he had become one of the top-earning sportswriters in the industry.

His reporting on corruption within the fight industry prompted former Governor Thomas E. Dewey to propose him as chairman of the New York State Boxing Commission in 1942, though he turned down the role as boxing commissioner.

In May 1947, the New York sportswriter began to contribute a guest sports column for the Montreal-based newspaper The Gazette. At the same time, he began contributing to the Ottawa Citizen. He often traveled to Montreal and, over time, developed a close friendship with Canadian sportsman Léo Dandurand.

Outside of newspapers, he produced stories for magazines. Parker wrote a highly cited article that was featured in Look magazine, titled "Boxing Is Still Legalized Murder," in 1950. He appeared in print in the June 1950 and March 1951 issues of Cosmopolitan magazine. One of his articles on boxing, "I Think the Boxing Business Smells," was featured in True magazine in 1953.

Throughout the 1950s, he spent numerous years leading the Damon Runyon Memorial Fund for Cancer Research as its president.

He was recognized in the boxing world for leading the press campaign that revealed corruption within the International Boxing Club of New York. In March 1955, he wrote "The Killer Who Controls the Fights," a 10-page article on the mobster Frankie Carbo. He went on to receive his second Page One Award from the Newspaper Guild of New York for his November 1955 series, "They're Murdering Boxing." His exposés revealing underworld influence in professional boxing were followed by official probes and the 1959 conviction of Frankie Carbo and associates.

The city of Waterbury officially named and dedicated Dan Parker Drive for the sportswriter in 1958. The suggestion was put forward by Chic Feldman, later reprinted by Hank O’Donnell, and supported by Sol Bernstein.

=== New York Journal-American ===
The veteran sports columnist held his position at The New York Daily Mirror until it was discontinued in 1963. Even as the rest of the staff moved on, he continued working from the paper's newsroom and temporarily shifted his column to the now-defunct New York Journal-American.

== Death ==
Parker passed away from cancer at Saint Mary's Hospital in Waterbury, Connecticut, United States, on May 20, 1967, at 73.

== Awards and honors ==
- National Headliners Award for sportswriting (1949)
- Fraternal Order of Eagles National Civic Award (1950)
- Newspaper Guild of New York Page One Award (1951)
- Newspaper Guild of New York Page One Award (1956)
- Newspaper Guild of New York Page One Award (1961)
- Long Island University George Polk Award (1954)
- National Sportscasters and Sportswriters Award (1960)
- New York Newspaper Reporters Association Schaeffer Award
- National Sportscasters and Sportswriters Hall of Fame inductee (1975)
- International Boxing Hall of Fame inductee (1996)
