= Oscar Beauchemin =

American architect

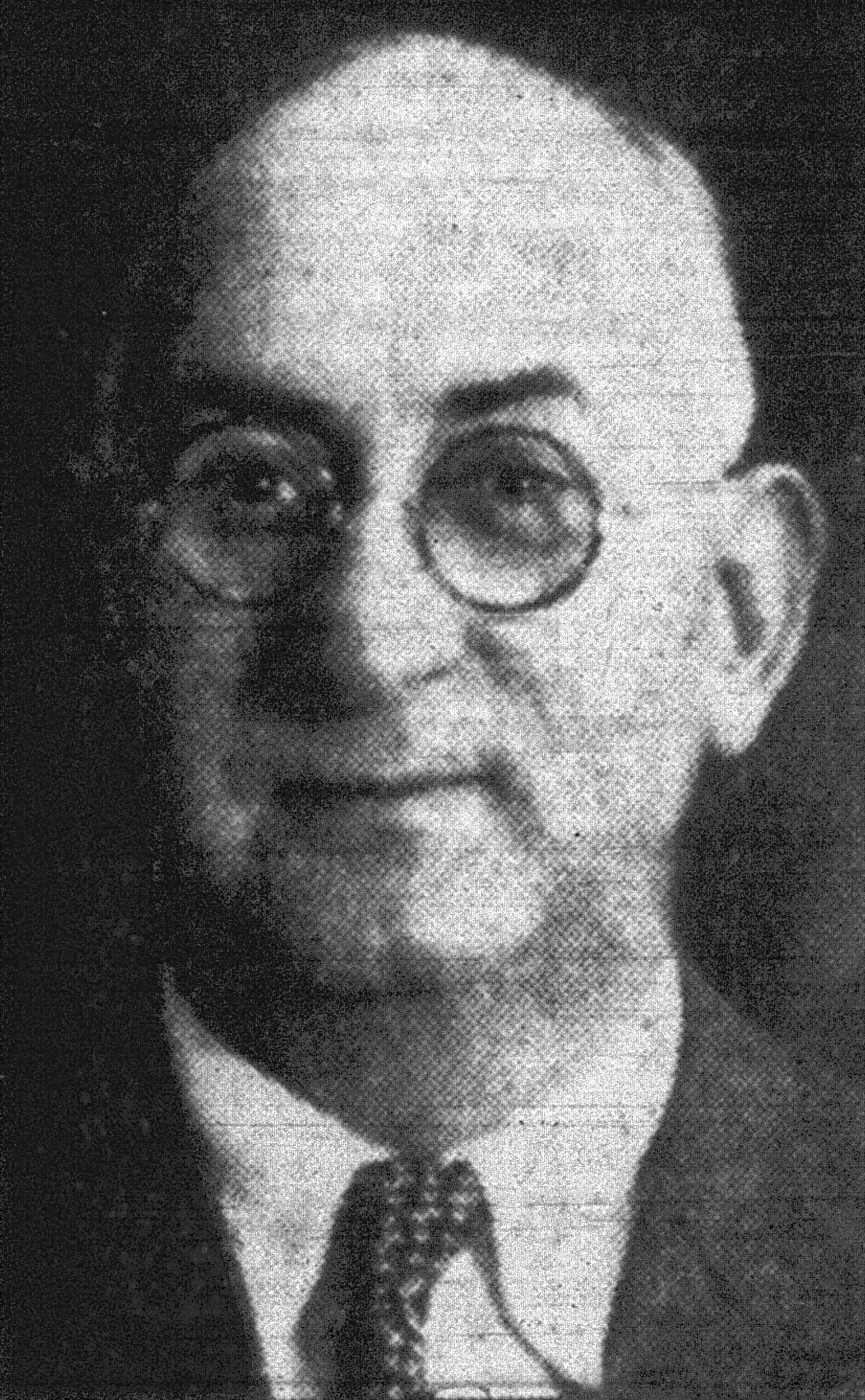
- Portrait of Beauchemin, c. 1938
- Born: c. 1876; Quebec, Canada
- Died: January 15, 1938 (aged 62); Holyoke, Massachusetts, U.S.
- Resting place: Calvary Cemetery; Holyoke, Massachusetts
- Known for: Architect
- Notable work: Valley Arena; J.R. Smith Block; Holyoke Transportation Center; Springdale Main Street The Parkside Paquette Block Guenther Block
- Spouse: Maria E. Doherty

Oscar Beauchemin (c. 1876 – January 15, 1938) was an American architect, and civil engineer based out of Holyoke, Massachusetts who designed a number of tenements and commercial blocks in the Greater Springfield area, and whose work was prominent in the Main Street architectural landscape of the Springdale neighborhood of Holyoke, Massachusetts.

Beauchemin was born in Quebec around the year 1876, with his family relocating to Holyoke within a year, where he would spend nearly his entire childhood. For the first part of his subsequent career, he was employed by the Merrick Lumber Company. Having a long-held interest in designing buildings, he first became active as an architect in 1903, and opened his own independent firm in 1908.

By the end of his career Beauchemin had become under the employ of Holyoke's municipal engineering department. Throughout his life he was an active member Massachusetts Catholic Order of Foresters and was known to be a competitive candlepin bowler.

Following a period of brief illness, he died in the evening of January 15, 1938 at his home at about the age of 62.

== Selected works ==
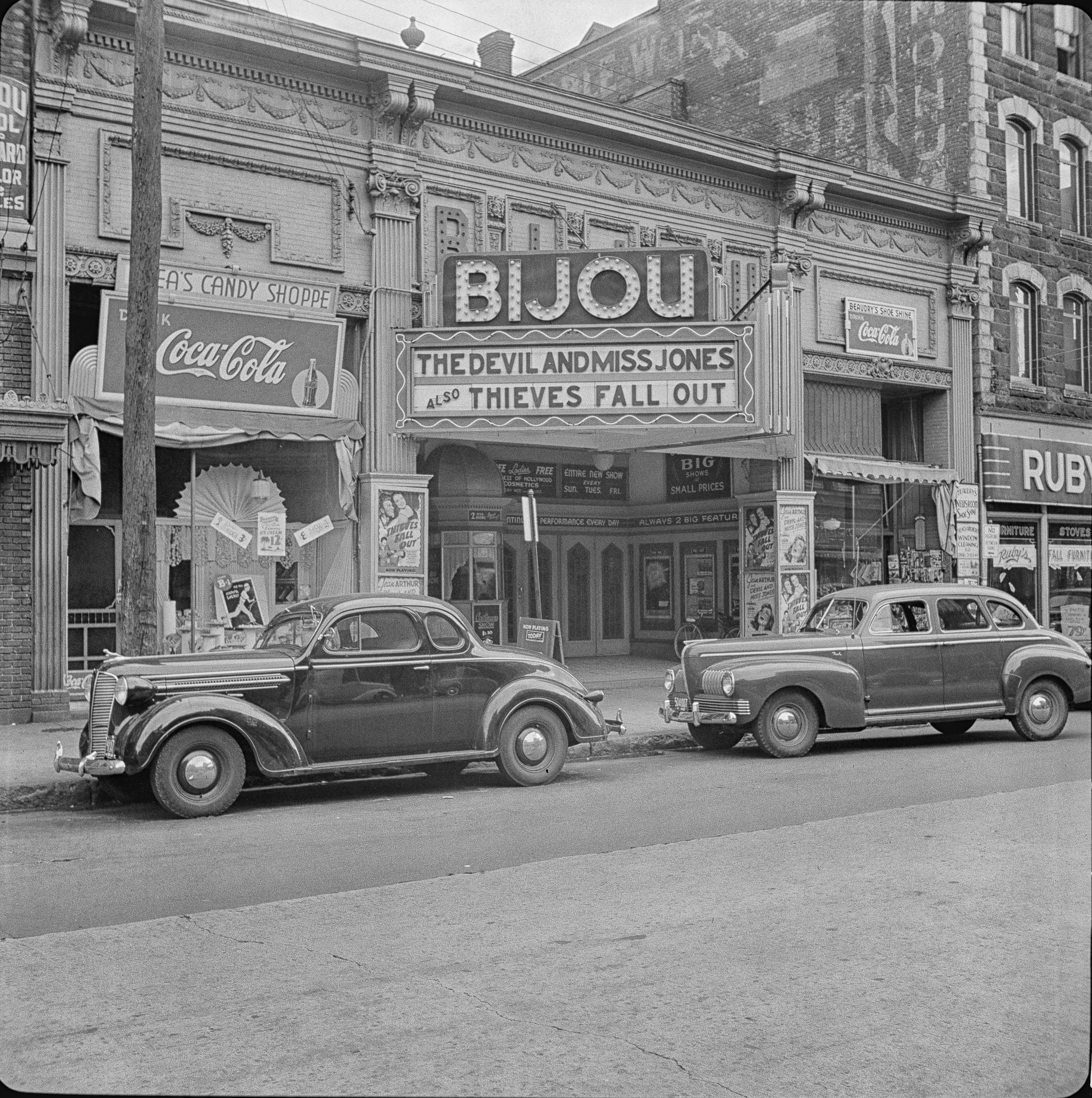
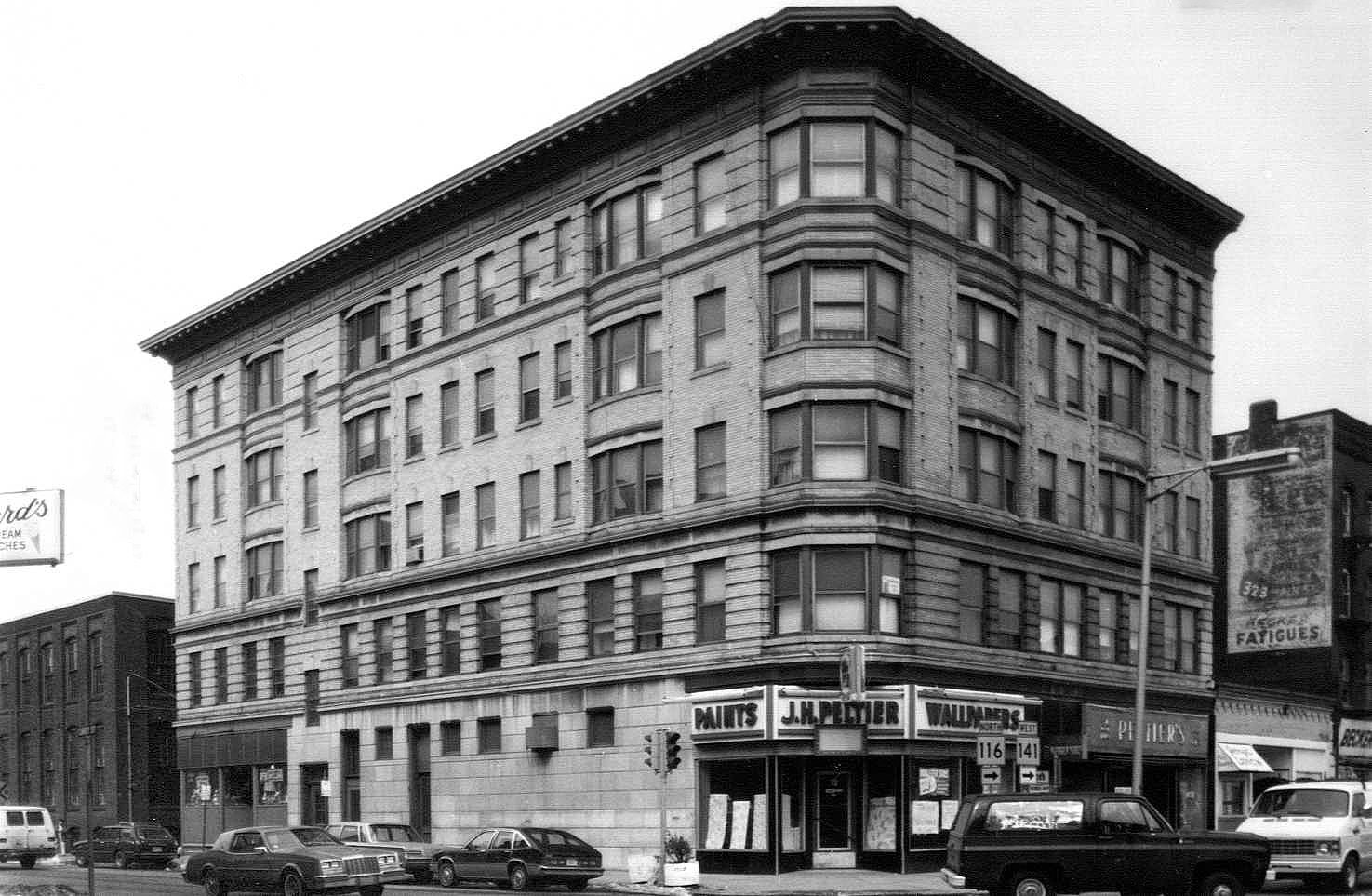
The Bijou Theatre (top), built in 1913 and expanded in 1916, it was demolished around 1960; 331-335 Main Street, a commercial and residential block at the corner of Main and Cabot, built 1911, razed in a fire in 1989

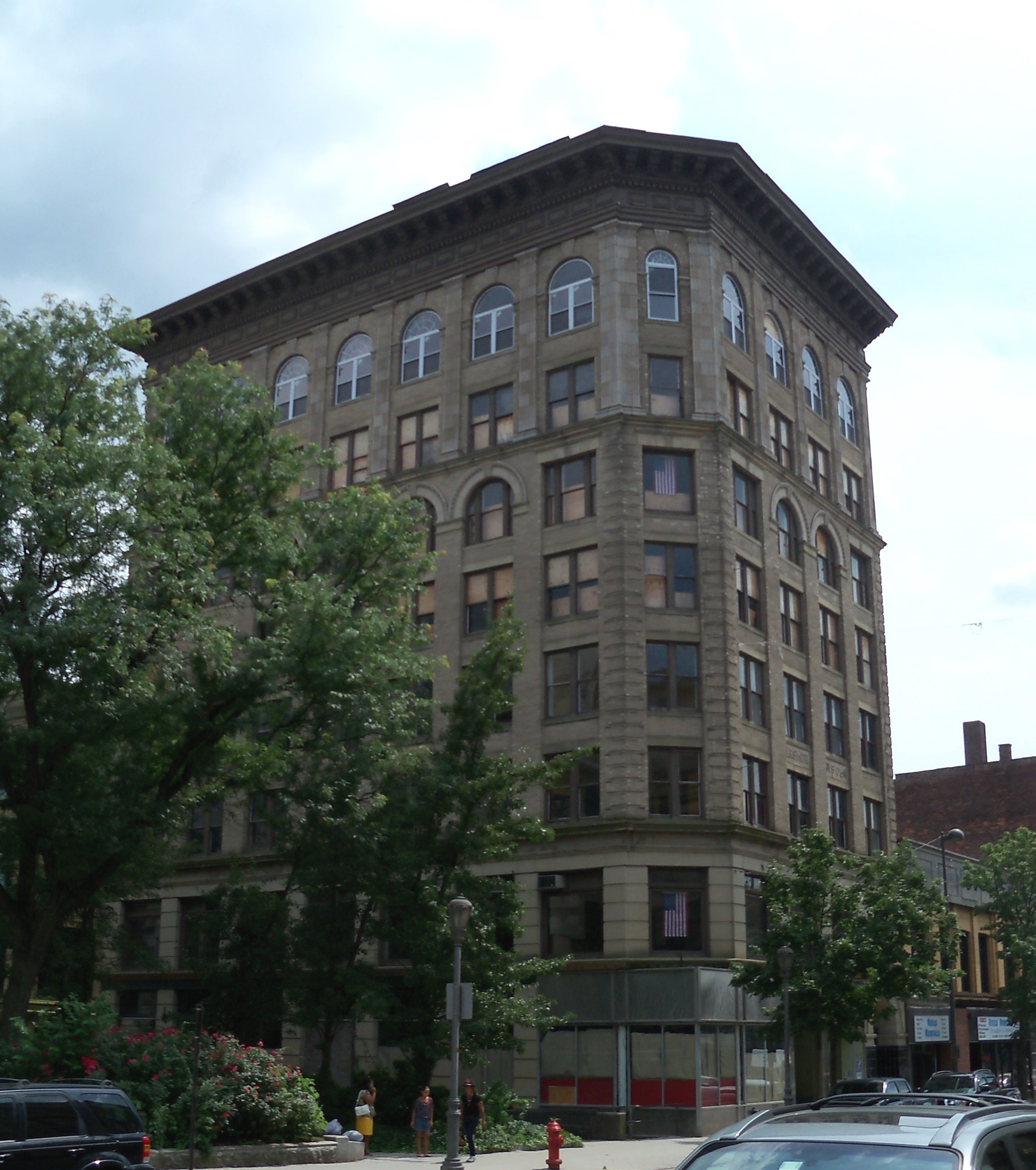
The J.R. Smith Building, also known as the Prew Building, built 1906

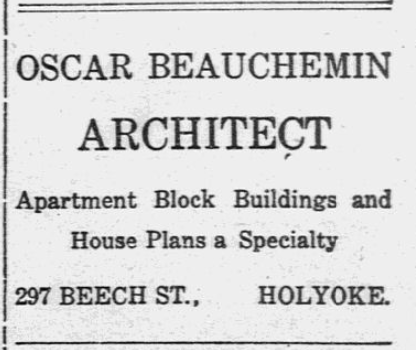
1910 advertisement in the Springfield Republican

While known to have constructed smaller dwellings as well, Beauchemin's works were generally large brick tenements with ground-floor storefronts or offices, done in the neoclassical style. Among features common to his work were festoon-adorned friezes, belt courses and angled windows placed at a corner of the front facade.

- J.R. Smith Block, Holyoke, Massachusetts (1906)
- Bergeron Apartments, Chicopee, Massachusetts (1909)
- The Clinton, Holyoke, Massachusetts (1909)
- Cavagnare Block/736-740 Dwight St., Holyoke, Massachusetts (1909, demolished c. 2000)
- Oakdale Pharmacy Block, Holyoke, Massachusetts (1910)
- The Parkview, Springdale, Holyoke, Massachusetts (c. 1910) (Note: The estimated date given in the state historic commission's entry, 1890/1894, precedes the designer's entry into architectural practice and places him at about the age of 14. Prior sources indicate 1910 as the earliest date of construction.)
- Paquette Block, Springdale, Holyoke, Massachusetts (c. 1910) (Note: Listed in MACRIS as single property, Paquette-Guenther/Springdale Tenement Block, while earlier sources and city assessor's map places the connected blocks as two properties.)
- Guenther Block, Springdale, Holyoke, Massachusetts (c. 1910)
- Wayfinders Dwight/Clinton, Holyoke, Massachusetts (1910), formerly Gauthier Block
- 331-335 Main Street, Holyoke, Massachusetts (1911, demolished 1989)
- Choiniere & Beauregard Block, Springfield, Massachusetts (1912, demolished)
- Pelott Block, Holyoke, Massachusetts (1912) (Note: Listed in same listing by Massachusetts Historical Commission as "The Clinton" despite having different construction and not appearing with that building on 1911 map.)
- Bijou Theater, Holyoke, Massachusetts (1913, 1916 expansion, demolished)
- Holyoke Transportation Center, Holyoke, Massachusetts (1914), formerly Holyoke Central Fire Station
- Knights of Columbus Building, Holyoke, Massachusetts (1915, demolished)
- M. A. Scannell House, Holyoke, Massachusetts (1915)
- The Colonial/Beauvais Block, Holyoke, Massachusetts (1916)
- Dennis M. Reardon House, South Hadley, Massachusetts (1916)
- Valley Arena Gardens, Holyoke, Massachusetts (1926), noted sports and entertainment venue best known as the site of Rocky Marciano's professional debut
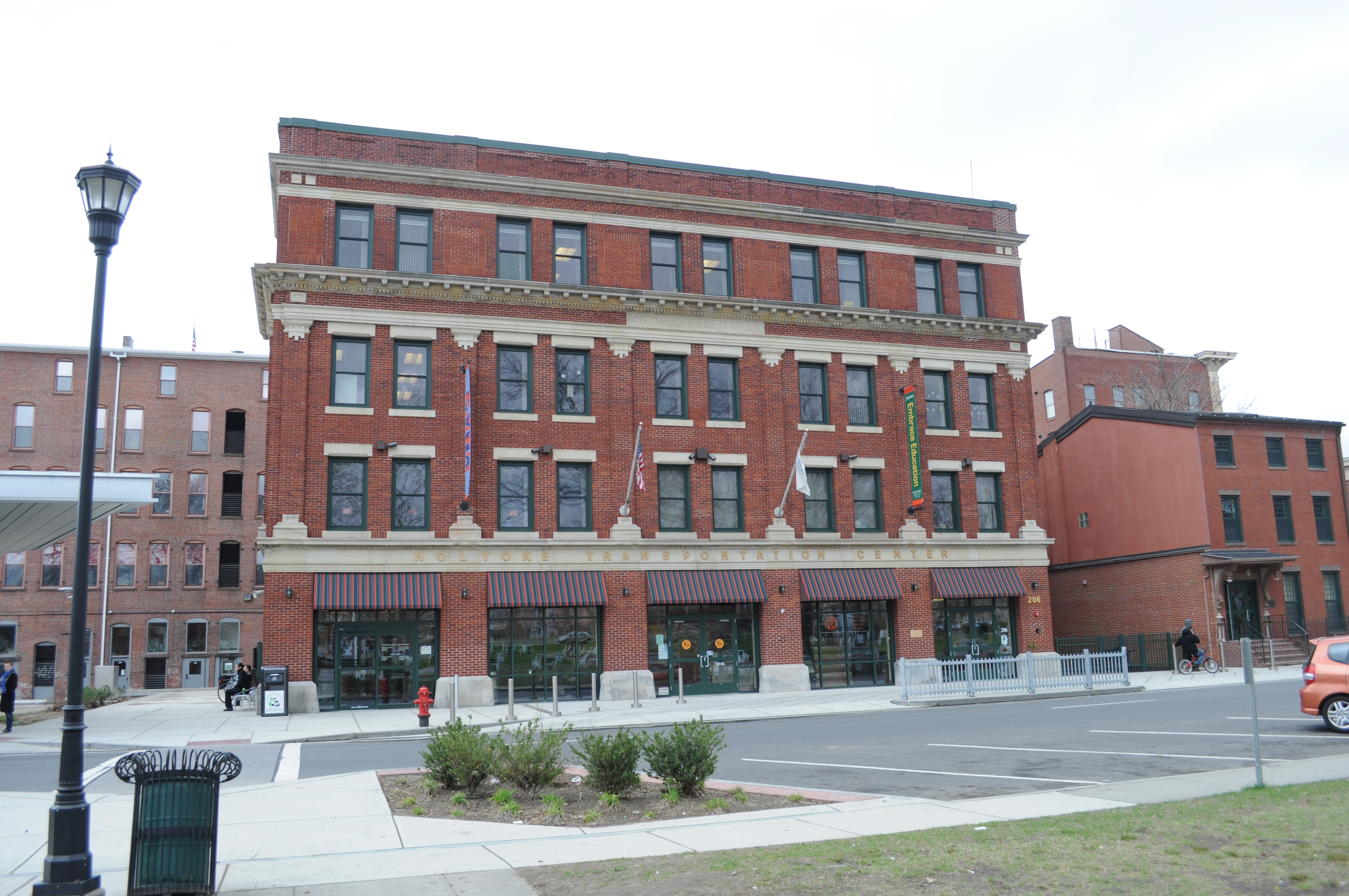
The former Central Fire Station, redeveloped as the Holyoke Transportation Center in 2010

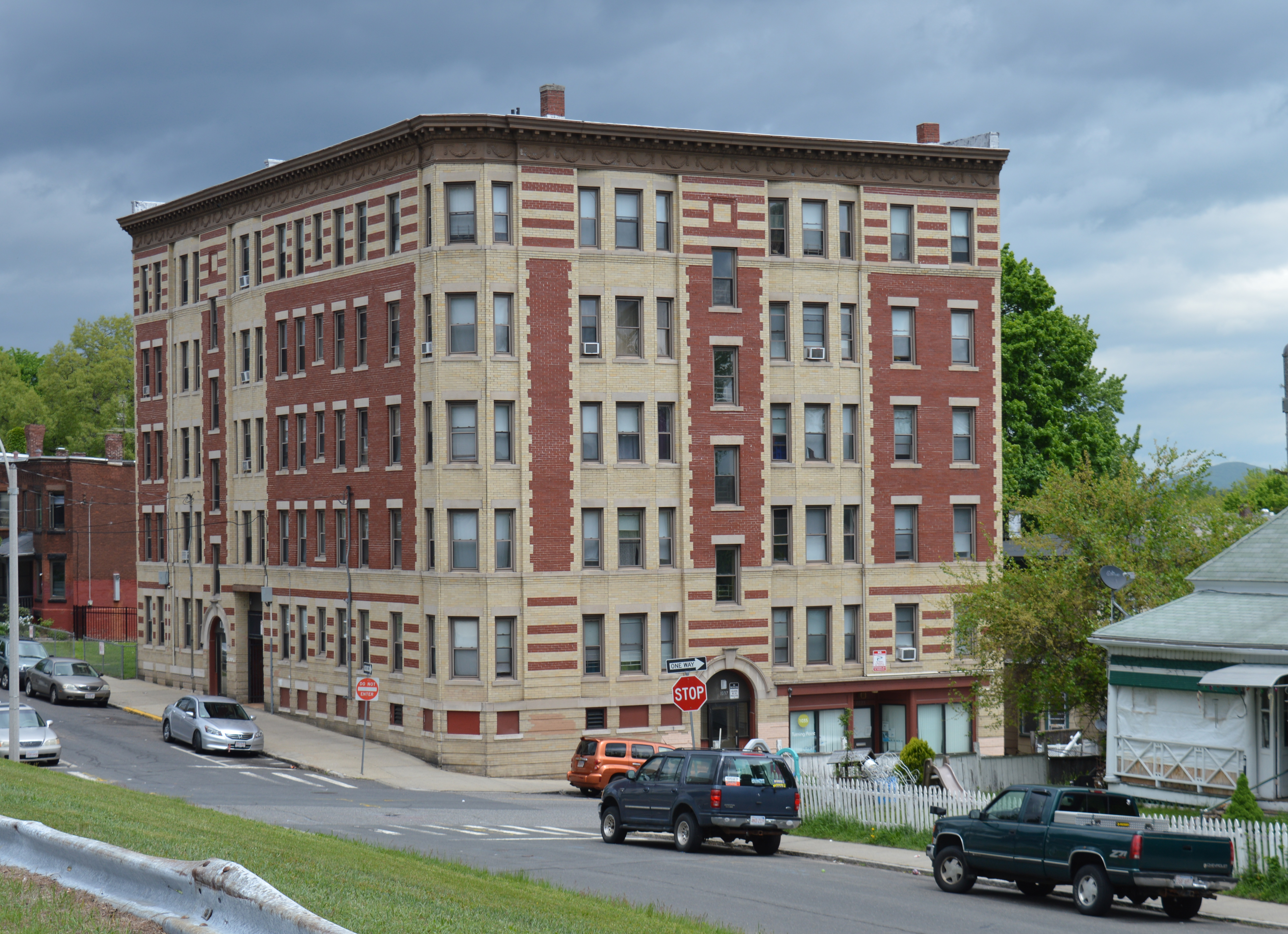
Gauthier Block, built c. 1910

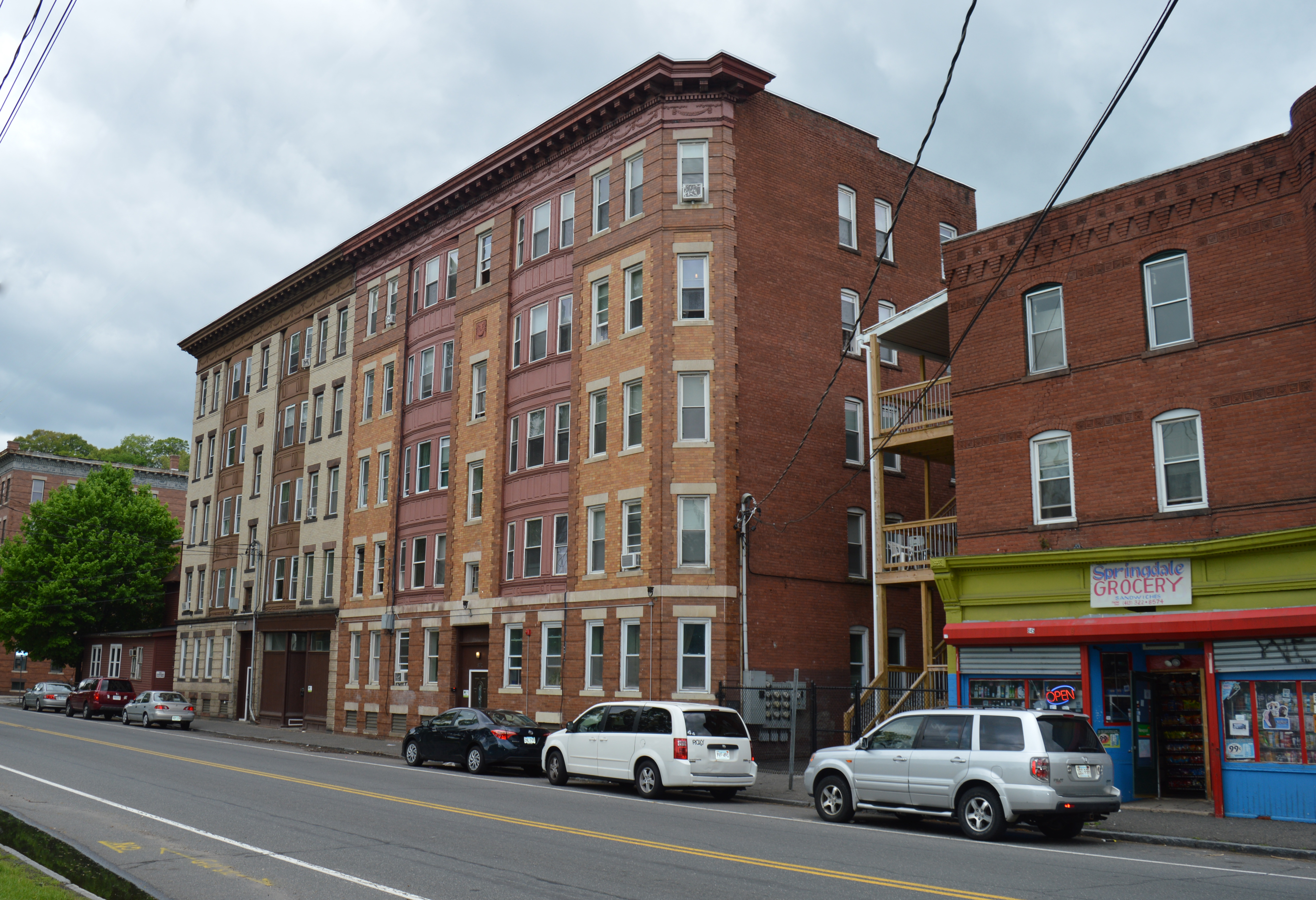
Guenther Block (left) and Paquette Block (right), both built circa 1909-1910

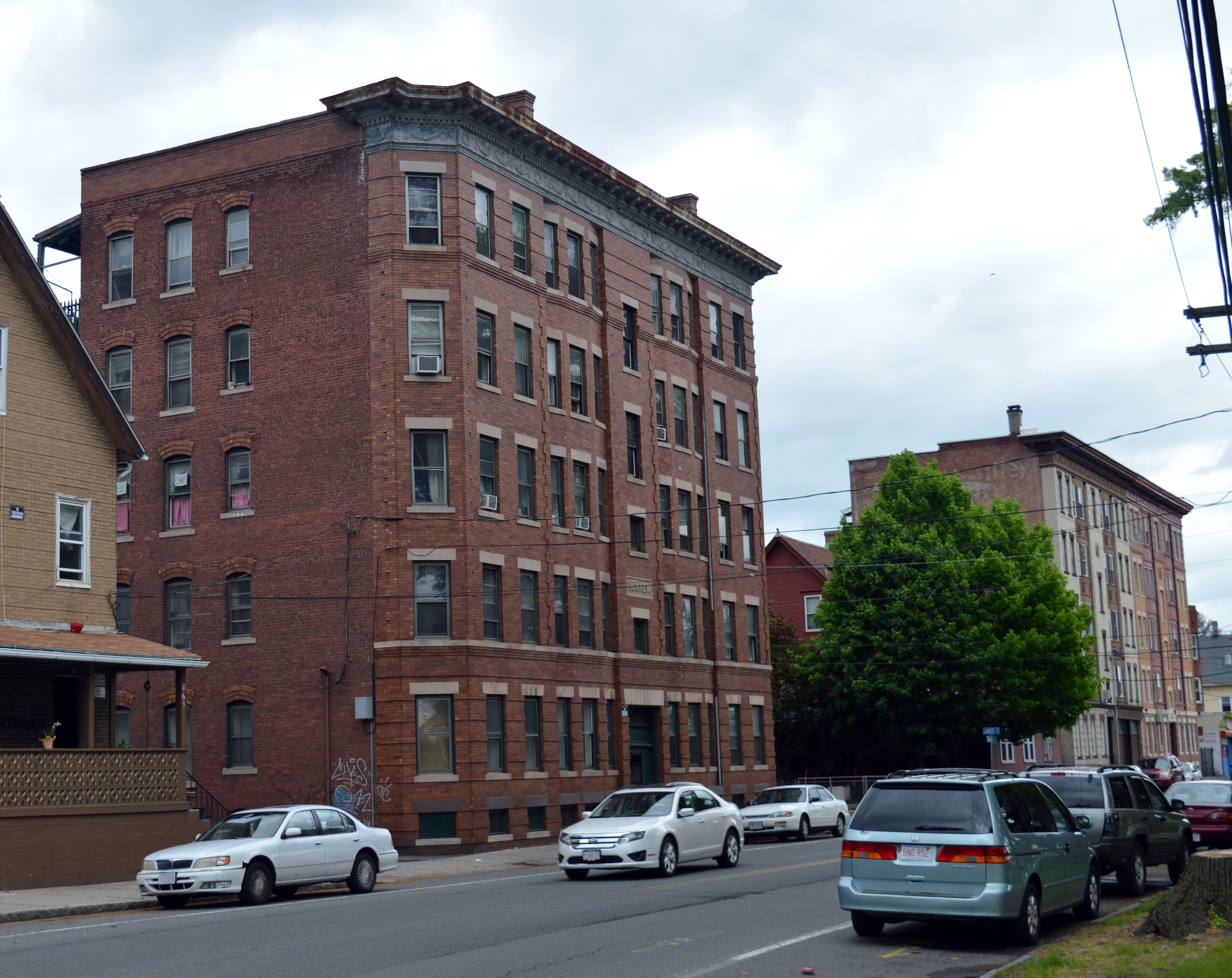
The Parkview, built 1910; it along with Guenther and Paquette being defining features of Springdale's Main Street landscape

== See also ==
- George P. B. Alderman
- James A. Clough
