= Springdale, Holyoke, Massachusetts =

Springdale
- Neighborhood of Holyoke
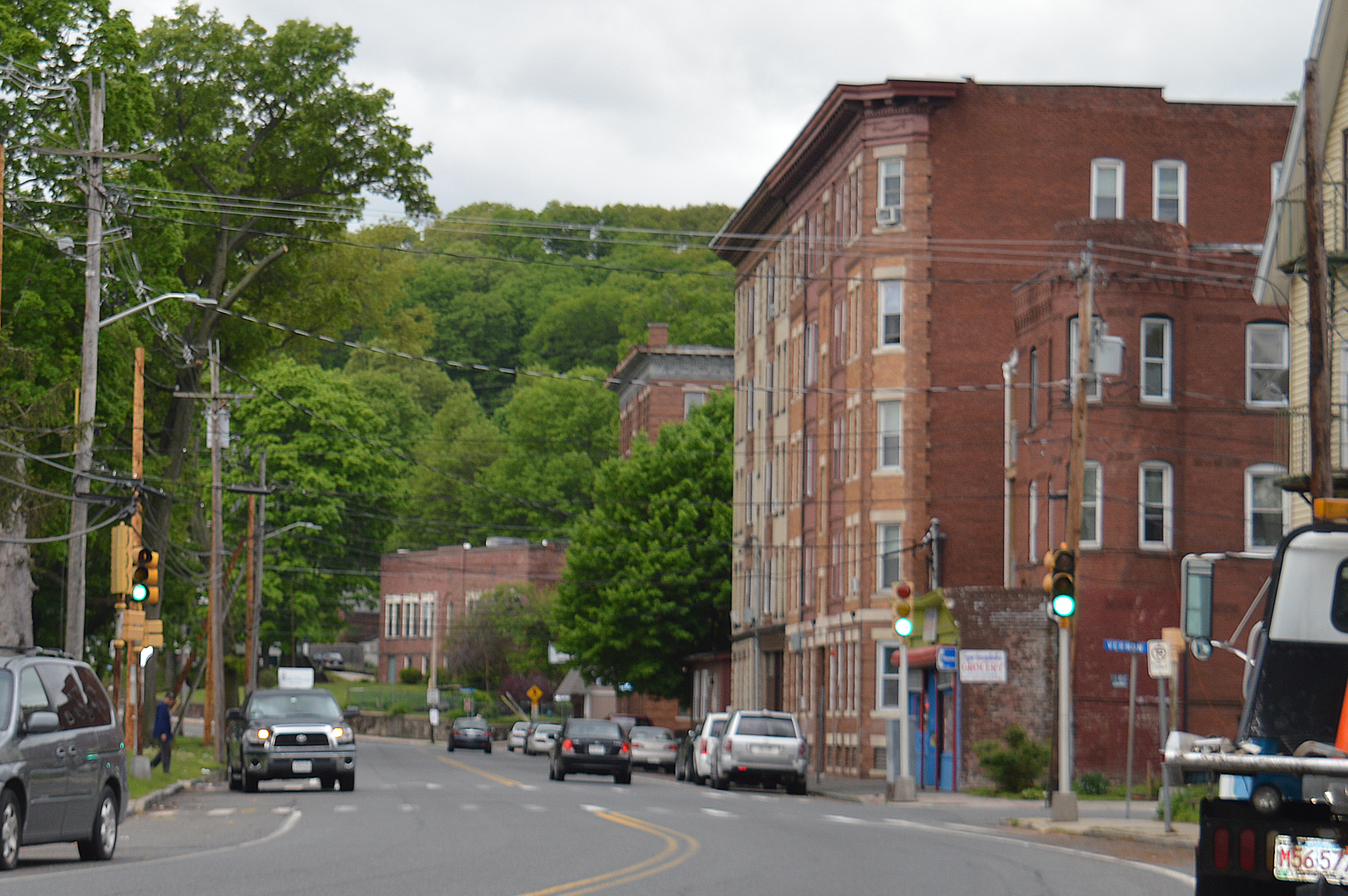
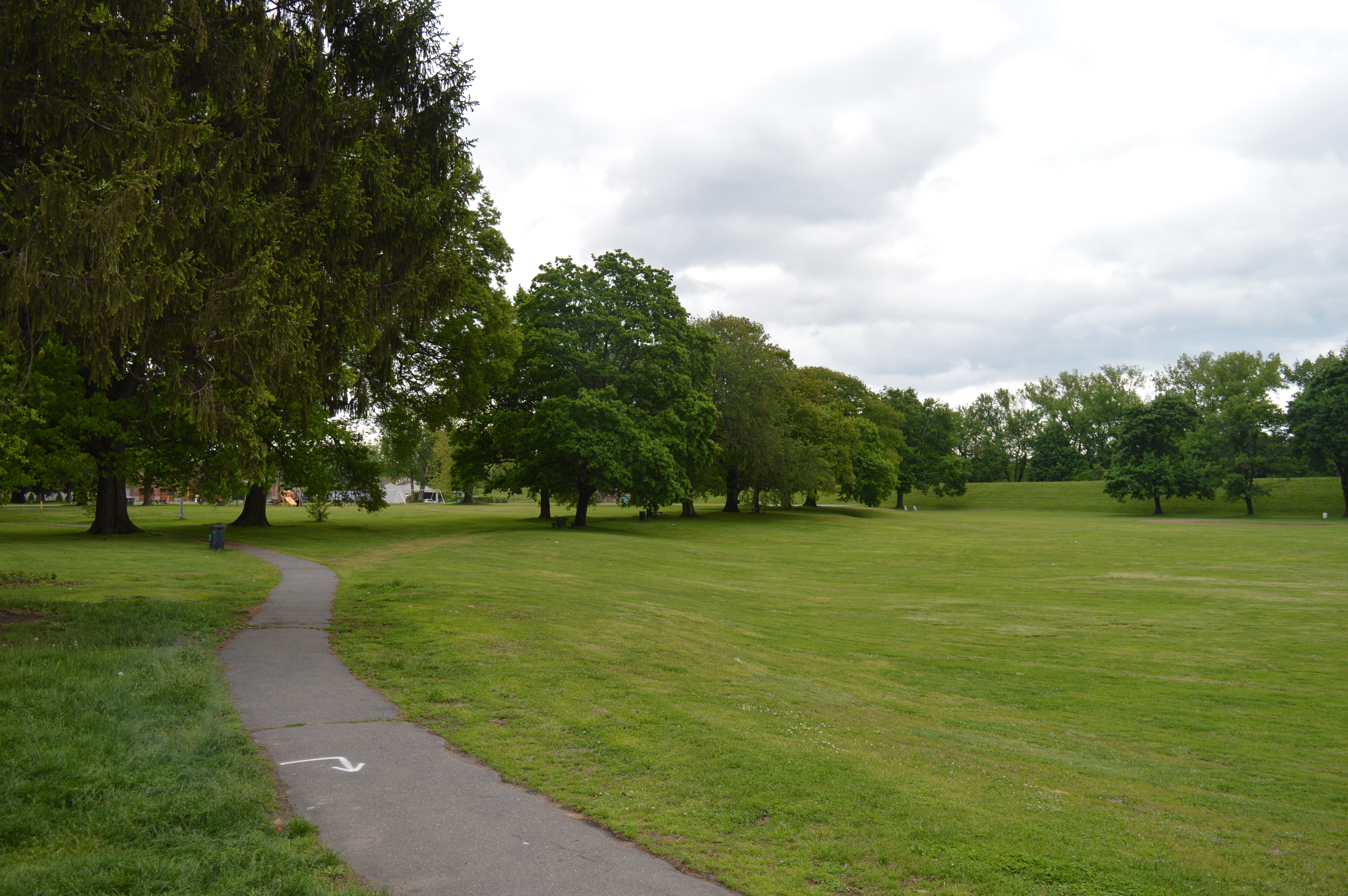
- Top to bottom: Main Street streetscape featuring blocks by Oscar Beauchemin, Springdale Park, designed by the Olmsted Brothers

- Location within Holyoke Location within Massachusetts Location within the United States
- Coordinates: 42°11′30″N 72°37′13″W
- Country: United States
- State: Massachusetts
- City: Holyoke
- Wards: 2
- Precincts: 2A, 2B
- Established: October 1887
- Founder: John J. Prew

Area
  - Total: 0.28 sq mi (0.73 km^{2})
- Elevation: 66 ft (20 m)
- ZIP code: 01040
- Area code: 413
- GNIS feature ID: 609091

Springdale is a neighborhood in Holyoke, Massachusetts located to the south of the city center, approximately 1 mile (1.6 km) from downtown, on the banks of the Connecticut River. Initially established as Day's Landing for its first settlement, the neighborhood features Springdale Park, originally known as Riverside Park, which was designed by the influential Olmsted Brothers landscape architecture firm, as well as light industry and machine shops, residential housing, and the central supply warehouse of Holyoke Public Schools. The mixed zoning neighborhood was developed as a streetcar suburb by brickmaker John J. Prew, who gave the area its name and devised the first street plans and building lots for the area in 1887 as housing for millworkers of South Holyoke. Since 1984, Springdale Park has hosted the city's annual Western Massachusetts Puerto Rican Parade, a three-day annual event in June celebrating the city's Latin culture and music.

== History ==
=== Early settlement ===
Prior to its christening as Springdale, the area was largely undeveloped. In the earliest days of Elmwood when it was known as Baptist Village, one of the first members of the community to be baptized, prior to the organization of the First Church, was one Jedediah Day (1755–1839). Day made his homestead by the shores of the Connecticut, about where Springdale Park is located, and it was here that small shallow riverboats would unload their goods going north from Springfield, before reaching the South Hadley Canal. The area, sometimes referred to as Hampden Landing, became known for its namesake as Diah Day's or Jed Day's Landing, the latter being a name used by a road today in the vicinity of that original site.

By 1870 only 3 landholders appeared in an atlas of the city, including the Holyoke Water Power Company. By 1875, newspapers began to reference the South Holyoke Driving Park, a venue which sat just to the northeast of the track later built at Springdale Park, which became synonymous with horse races and agricultural fairs.

=== Founding and development ===
The area to the southwest of this land, modern-day Springdale remained largely undeveloped until October 1887, when local brickmaker and developer John J. Prew (née Proulx) announced that he had purchased 11 acres and divided much of it into building lots, about 50 by 125 in size, set along three streets, Vernon, Temple, and one then-unnamed. Calling this new development Springdale, Prew developed the area as living quarters for workers at the mills in South Holyoke, with the notion that many of those previously living in tenants could become new homeowners. The earliest landholders were largely German, as the Germania Mills and einwanderkolonie (immigrant colony) were a short distance away in South Holyoke at that time. One of the first institutions built in Springdale besides its residential structures was the Springdale Turn Hall. Branching off of the Holyoke Turn Hall, a group of German factory workers purchased 12,000 square feet of land off Prew and began construction of the building in July 1888. The combined tavern and gymnasium, was constructed in the ideal of the Turners at that time "to promote physical and cultural education and training...to disseminate rational ideas". It would remain a pillar in the neighborhood, opening membership to others outside the German community, until its eventual decline and closure by 2011.

Home to a variety of tradesmen, factory, and city workers throughout its history, built from these roots the neighborhood retained a diverse ethnic demography throughout the 20th century. Built with a view of the newly designed Springdale Park, the neighborhood's housing took on a new character in 1910, when in a span of several years 3 large apartment blocks were constructed on Main Street from designs furnished by local architect Oscar Beauchemin; the Parkview, Paquette, and Guenther blocks still define the neighborhood's developed landscape today.

=== Springdale Park ===
Prew would undertake one of his largest projects in the area in 1895, when he and business partner William Norris purchased 20 acres of land on the banks of the Connecticut River. The two would develop this land into the successor of the former South Holyoke Driving Park, fitting a half-mile racetrack which would be used for both horse racing as well as cycle racing in its ten-year history.

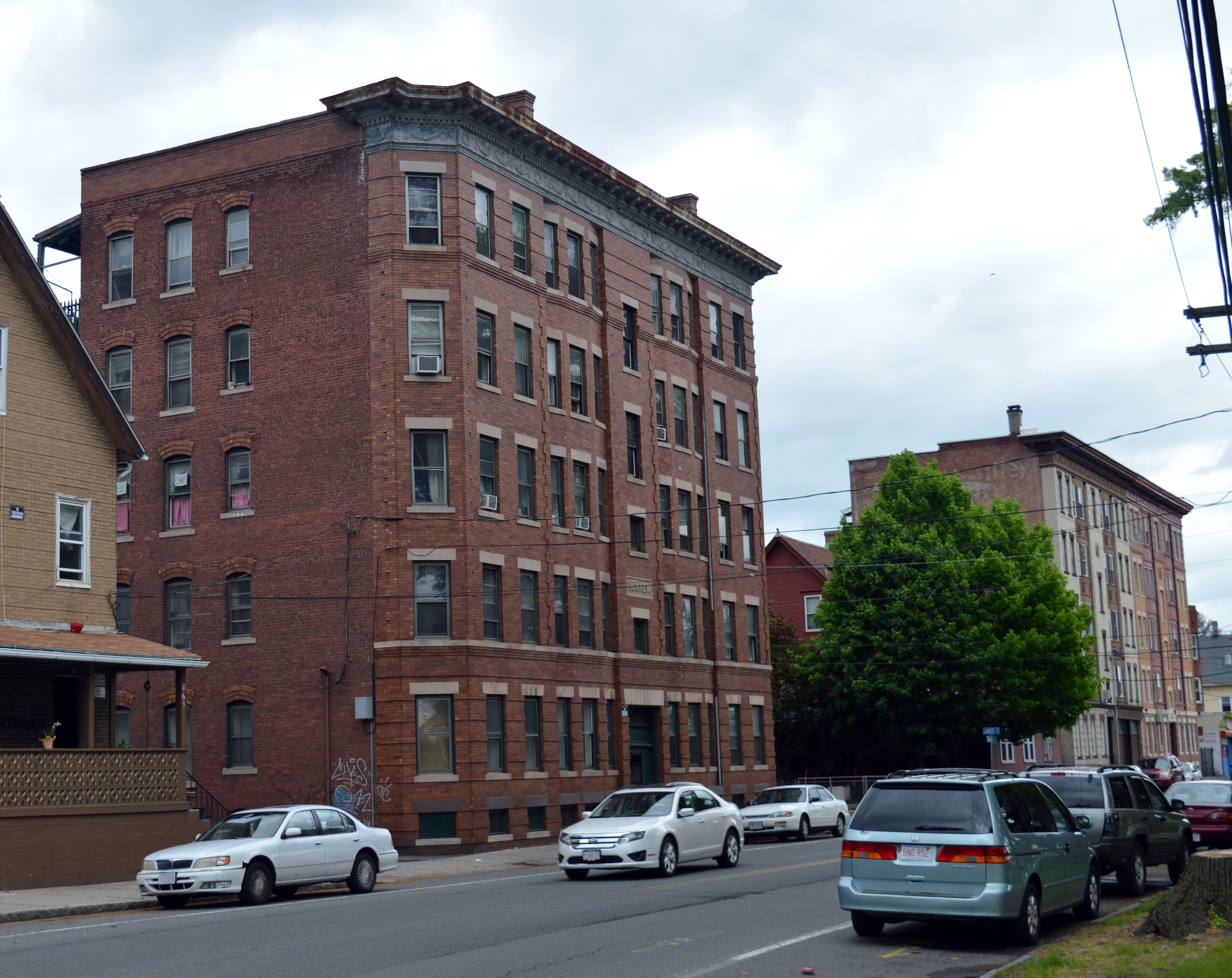
The Parkview block on Main Street, Springdale, build c. 1910

In Spring of 1905, the driving park's races came to an end when, following a series of failed negotiations the city's park commission acquired the land by eminent domain, renaming it at the time Riverside Park. During that summer the city hired the respected Olmsted Brothers firm, sons of Frederick Law Olmsted of Central Park fame, to redevelop the site as a mixed use park, following a year of study their plans, which included a cricket pitch, baseball fields, a wading pool, track, and gym facilities, were completed in the summer of 1906.

== See also ==
- Oakdale, Holyoke, Massachusetts, another streetcar suburb neighborhood established by a single developer, two years prior to Springdale
- Lestoil, detergent product first manufactured for a national market in Springdale
