= Pennsylvania Boxing Hall of Fame =

Pennsylvania Boxing Hall of Fame (PABHOF)
- Established: 1958
- Type: Hall of Fame
- Founder: Veteran Boxers Association Ring 1

The Pennsylvania Boxing Hall of Fame (abbreviated PABHOF) is a sports hall of fame established in Pennsylvania, United States, in 1958, with over 430 inductees.

== History ==
The Pennsylvania Boxing Hall of Fame was founded in 1958. Established by members of the Veteran Boxers Association Ring 1, the hall honors Pennsylvania's boxing heritage.

The Hall of Fame held its first induction under the direction of VBA president Joe Guinan. The original 1958 class selected as "Pennsylvanians who have made outstanding contributions to boxing" included Harry Greb, Philadelphia Jack O'Brien, Lew Tendler, Billy Conn, and Tommy Loughran. A Pennsylvania Boxing Hall of Fame plaque was unveiled in the lobby of the Convention Hall in Philadelphia, with Conn, Loughran, and Tendler in attendance.

In 2014, Jacqui Frazier-Lyde, daughter of Smokin' Joe Frazier, became the first female boxer inducted into the Pennsylvania Boxing Hall of Fame.

== Inductees ==
- 1958: Billy Conn, Harry Greb, Tommy Loughran, Philadelphia Jack O'Brien, Lew Tendler
- 1959: Leo Houck, Harry Lewis, Jack McGuigan
- 1960: Frank Klaus
- 1961: Pete Latzo, Young Loughrey, Herman Taylor
- 1962: Johnny Burns, Cuddy Demarco, Tommy O'Toole
- 1963: Billy Soose, Johnny Jadick
- 1964: Benny Bass, Rocky Castellani, Johnny Mealey
- 1965: Benny Kauffman, Sammy Smith, Frank Weiner, Tony Morgano
- 1966: Bobby Barrett, Lou Jaffe, Fritzie Zivic
- 1967: Battling Levinsky
- 1968: Midget Wolgast, Harry 'Kid' Brown, Jimmy Mendo
- 1969: Pat Bradley, Johnny Clark, Freddie Kelly, Bernard Lemisch
- 1970: Jack McCarron
- 1971: Sammy Angott, Nat Frank, Bill Maher
- 1972: Joey Giardello, Teddy Yarosz
- 1973: Gus Dorazio, Pal Moore, Frank Palumbo
- 1974: Harold Johnson, Joe Cervino, Bobby Wolgast
- 1975: Eddie Cool, Jimmy Toppi, Lew Massey
- 1976: Frankie Caris, Mike Evans, Billy Speary, Pete Tomasco
- 1977: Angelo Dundee, Jack Blackburn, Henry 'Kid' Wolfe
- 1978: Chris Dundee, Harry Blitman, Ernie Caesar, Tony Falco, Willie Patterson, Babe Ruth
- 1979: Dan Bucceroni, Jimmy Carlini, Bobby Dean, Yank Durham, Charlie Ettinger, Eddie Giosa, Joe Shannon, Joe Sweeney, Joe Polino
- 1980: Teddy Baldwin, Frankie Carto, Gene Gollotto, Francis Lederer, Nick Spano, Young Robideau
- 1981: Patsey Bradley, Willie Curry, Billy Davis, Bat Dundee, Lew Skymer, John McCullough
- 1982: Frank Palermo, Nunzio Carto, J.J. Harrington, George Katz, Pete Kelly, Charles Santore
- 1983: Carmen Bartolomeo, Hank Cisco, Robert Hurst, Tommy Maher, Franny Rafferty
- 1984: Vic Capcino, Tony Cisco, Ed Keenan, Ralph Lake, Steve Traitz Sr., Dave Zinkoff, Marty Mellett
- 1985: Jackie Britton, Battling Gates
- 1986: George Benton, Joey Belfiore, Stanley 'Kitten' Hayward, Charles Sgrillo, Richie Martell
- 1987: Jimmy Burns, Kid Primo, Phil Sacks
- 1989: Frank Cappuccino, John 'Lefty' Carroll, Joe Crosly, Jack Costello, Joe Fagan, Jack Hauf, Johnny Haye, Jackie Lennon, Eddie Woods, Johnny Pepe
- 1990: Mickey Martell, Willie 'The Worm' Monroe
- 1991: Frankie Sodano, Joe Frazier, Frankie Sodano, Tommy Ruth
- 1993: Santa Bucca, Wesley Mouzon, Johnny Natchez, Mayon Padlo
- 1994: Jimmy Binns, Lucien Blackwell, Hank Kropinski, Jimmy Soo, Tony Strazzeri, Howard McCall
- 1997: Randall "Tex" Cobb, Joe Bonadies
- 1998: Marvis Frazier, Jimmy Young, Robert Grasso
- 1999: Mickey Rosati
- 2000: Tommy Forte, Jimmie Stewart, Ike White, Johnny Wolgast
- 2002: Anthony Boyle, Bucky Decarlo, Eugene 'Cyclone' Hart, Nate Miller, Joe Sankey
- 2003: Buster Drayton, Joe Aurillo, John Carroll, Johnny Gilmore, Joe O'Neill
- 2004: Vinnie Burgese, Jimmy Deoria, Sammy Goss, Joe Trofe, Bobby 'Boogaloo' Watts
- 2005: Matthew Saad Muhammad, Bernard Fernandez, Frank Loughrey, Brian McGinley
- 2006: Jeff Chandler, Tyrone Everett, Tommy Cross, Rudy Donato, Chick Feldman, Marty Feldman, Mickey Grandinetti, Joe Guinan, Gypsy Joe Harris, Kevin Howard, Johnny Hutchinson, George Larover, Gennaro Pellegrini, J Russel Peltz, Willie Reddish, Pinny Schafer
- 2007: Bennie Briscoe, Danny Dougherty, Jimmie Sykes, Dick Turner, Len Matthews, Rodney Moore, Augie Pantellas
- 2008: Sonny Liston, Charles Brewer, Larry Holmes, Tim Witherspoon, Meldrick Taylor, Percy Bassett, Jack McKinney, Curtis Parker
- 2009: Dave Tiberi, Sidney Adams, Eddie Aliano, Henry 'Toothpick' Brown, Calvin Grove, Garnet 'Sugar' Hart, Robert Hines, Jimmy Wilson, Charley Scott
- 2010: Leotis Martin, Dwight Muhammad Qawi, Billy Arnold, Charlie "Choo Choo" Brown, Tyrone Crawley, Ed Derian, Mike Everett, Gary Hinton, Quenzell McCall
- 2011: Charlie Cummings, Don Elbaum, Al Ettore, George Godfrey, Joe Gramby, Richie Kates, Tommy Marciano, Jerry Martin, David Reid
- 2012: Joe Hand Sr., Johnny Carter, Nigel Collins, Eddie Corma, Dorsey Lay, Steve Little, Jessie Smith, Frank Moran, Joe Rowan
- 2013: Tyrell Biggs, Steve Smoger, Ivan Robinson, Charley Burley, Chuck Hasson, Fred Jenkins, Norman Torpey Sr., Roy 'Tiger' Williams, John Mulvenna, Mario Saurennann
- 2014: Naazim Richardson, Jacqui Frazier-Lyde, Mitch Allen, Earl Hargrove, Stan Hochman, Ed 'Gunboat' Smith, Leon Tabbs, Jimmy Tygh, Percy Manning, Mike Picciotti
- 2015: Jerome Artis, Milt Bailey, Wee Willie Davies, Baron Dougherty, Joey Eye, Bouie Fisher, John David Jackson, Sam Solomon, Steve Traitz Jr., Anthony Witherspoon, Tommy Yarosz, Tony Martin, Hank Quinn, Slim Jim Robinson, Roger Russell
- 2016: Benny Amparo, Jimmy Arthur, Bob Baker, Johnny Bizzarro, Harry Bobo, George Chip, Ralph Citro, Duke Dugent, George James, Hugh Kearney, Joe Thomas, Chucky T, Jack Obermayer, Andre Prophet, Augie Scimeca, Monty Sherrick
- 2017: Bert Cooper, Richie Bennett, David Bey, Buck Crouse, Buster Custus, Alfonso Hayman, George Hill, Wade Hinnant, Hammer Jones, Jerry Judge, Danny Kramer, Frank Kubach, Pittsburgh Jackie Wilson, Peter Maher, Lee Sala
- 2018: Jersey Joe Walcott, Mark Holmes, Mike Acri, Dr. George Bonner, Angel Cruz, Anthony Fletcher, Frank Fletcher, Tony Green, Ernie Singletary, Mike Stewart, Larry Torpey, Carey Williams, Marvin Mack, Stan Maliszewski, Johnny Morris, Willie Reddish Jr.
- 2019: Tony Thornton, Lynne Carter, Ivan Cohen, Vaughn Hooks, Kerry Judge, Charles Singleton, Will Taylor, Tony Thornton, Woodie Marcus, Al Massey, Barney McGinley, Art Rooney, Jack O'Halloran, Adolph Ritacco
- 2020: Bozy Ennis, Derek Ennis, Rudy Battle, Bill Bossio, Jim Deoria Sr., Johnny Forte, Otis Graham, Alfred Mitchell, Marshall Kauffman, Curtis Sheppard, Paul Spadafora, Maxie Strub, Myron Taylor, Billy Wallace, Bee Bee Wright, Jack McClelland, Willie Moore, Carol Polis
- 2021: Troy Fletcher, Marvin Garris, Kelvin Kelly, Julian Letterlough, Fernando Rodriguez
- 2022: Zahir Raheem, Freddie Pendleton, Michael Spinks, Bernard Hopkins, Michael Moorer, Tony Bersani, Lou Bizzarro, Dick Welsh, Tom Yankello, Harold Moore, Battling Murray, Rob Murray, Tommy Reed
- 2023: Yusaf Mack, Tom Cushman, Al Fennell, Willie Gibbs, Randy Griffin, Sloan Harrison, Gary Hegyi, Sam Hickman, Teon Kennedy, John Stewart, Barry Stumpf, Elvin Thompson, Harry Joe Yorgey, Reddy Moore, Arthur R. Pelullo, Freddy Reyes
- 2024: Jay Anderson, Shar'ron Baker, Nino Del Buono, Willie Folk, John Gallagher, Joe Hand Jr., Leroy Haynes, Brian Minto, Ken Hissner, Mike Koranicki, Terrance Lewis, Greg Sirb, Stanley Williams, Gerald Nobles, Billy Peacock, James Robinson, Gary Rosato
- 2025: Mike Jones (boxer), Young Gene Buffalo, Jules Aronson, Bob Wright, George Bochetto, Peter Byron, Kermit Cintron, Jimmy Clark, Jack Fried, Frank Gelb, Phil Glassman, Toochie Gordon, Bobby Gunnis, George Hanson, Eric Hunter, Honyechile Johnson, Lajuan Simon, Jason Sosa, Rick Steigerwald, Frank Taylor, Anthony Thompson, Frankie Mitchell, KO Becky O'Neill, Willie O'Neill, Jack Puggy
