= Sam Silverman (promoter) =

American boxing promoter (1909-1977)

- Born: Sam Silverman; December 25, 1909; Cambridge, Massachusetts, U.S.
- Died: July 9, 1977 (aged 67); Cambridge, Massachusetts, U.S.
- Other names: Subway Sam; Unsinkable Sam; Sad Sam
- Occupations: Matchmaker; Boxing promoter
- Years active: 1936-1977
- Awards: International Boxing Hall of Fame (2002)

Sam Silverman (December 25, 1909 - July 9, 1977) was an American boxing promoter active in New England. He was inducted into the International Boxing Hall of Fame in 2002.

== Early life ==
Sam Silverman was born in Cambridge, Massachusetts, United States, on December 25, 1909.

He began boxing in East Cambridge and transitioned to matchmaking. After attending Boston University journalism school for a year, he left due to tuition costs.

== Career ==
After becoming a licensed promoter in 1935, Sam Silverman began presenting boxing shows in 1936 and over four decades built a record of some 12,000 events.

His first promotions were in New Bedford before starting in Lynn, Massachusetts. Silverman partnered with Jimmy Mede, the local wrestling promoter at Lynn Arena, and went on to launch fight programs in an old casino in Fall River and in Worcester.

In June 1945, Sam Silverman, partnering with Jimmy Mede, acquired the Callahan A.C., the Boston unit of his New England boxing chain. The pair bought the interests from veteran boxing promoter Eddie Mack and Jack O'Brien for $5,000. It expanded on the shows they had promoted in New Bedford, Fall River, Worcester, and previously in Lynn. In its Boston debut, the Callahan show drew a crowd of 4,432 and gross gate receipts of $8,209.25 at Mechanics Hall.

When he broke into Boston, he extended operations to Providence, Salem, and Manchester. He also leased the Valley Arena Gardens in Holyoke for weekly shows. During the summer of 1946, Silverman arranged fifteen night shows at Braves Field.

From 1946 to 1977, he worked in partnership with Bostonian promoter Rip Valenti.

Sam Silverman became sole owner of the Callahan A.C. in May 1947, the club named after Andy Callahan of Lawrence, Massachusetts, and ran weekly boxing programs at Boston Garden and Boston Arena.

Starting in 1947, Silverman handled promotion for 31 of Rocky Marciano's 49 matches.

During the 1950s, Silverman ended his association with the International Boxing Club of New York run by James D. Norris. Later, four bombs hit his home in Chelsea in June 1954, damaging the foundation and windows but injuring no one. Investigators suspected New York racketeers after he refused them a share of his lucrative televised boxing matches.

By 1957, the only fight club Silverman managed was Holyoke's Valley Arena Gardens. Silverman received $250 per fight from Madison Square Garden during the 1960s to prepare young boxers for MSG's televised matches.

He staged 25 world championship bouts, such as Saddler–Collins (1952), DeMarco–Basilio II (1955), DeMarco–Saxton (1955), and Pender–Robinson (1960). In 1960, his biggest year, Silverman promoted two Paul Pender–Sugar Ray Robinson title bouts and won $125,000 in a monopoly case against IBC head James Norris. At the time, Silverman had an office on Boston's Canal Street, the home of Sam Silverman Boxing Enterprises.

His ambition to promote a world heavyweight championship match went unfulfilled. He originally lined up Muhammad Ali vs. Sonny Liston II in 1965, but Ali's hernia delayed the fight, which was later staged by another promoter in Lewiston, Maine.

Silverman was promoting in Portland, Maine, by 1970, using the Portland Expo for Thursday night fights.

In 1973, the veteran matchmaker started promoting Brockton's Marvin Hagler when the New England and National AAU middleweight champion turned pro.

== Death ==
Sam Silverman died on July 9, 1977, in Cambridge, Massachusetts, United States, after his vehicle ran off the road on Massachusetts Route 2, at 64 years old.

His funeral drew a crowd of 500, including boxers, referees, fans, and friends.

== Legacy ==
For nearly 40 years, Sam Silverman was active as a boxing promoter. He put on thousands of boxing shows throughout his career.

He was credited with keeping boxing alive in New England. The Cambridge-born promoter once ran thirteen weekly fight clubs in New England and could promote up to three shows in different cities in a single night.

Sam Silverman was inducted into the International Boxing Hall of Fame in 2002.
