= Bruce Trampler =

American boxing matchmaker

- Born: August 11, 1949 (age 76); Maplewood, New Jersey, U.S.
- Occupation: Boxing Matchmaker
- Known for: Orchestrating the careers of Boxing's superstars
- Website: https://www.toprank.com/

Bruce Trampler (born August 11, 1949) is an American boxing matchmaker whose career highlights include orchestrating and helping the careers of world champions including Floyd Mayweather Jr., Michael Carbajal, Oscar De La Hoya, Johnny Tapia, Erik Morales, and Miguel Cotto. He was inducted into the World Boxing Hall of Fame in 1999 and the International Boxing Hall of Fame in 2010.

== Early life ==
Trampler was born in Maplewood, New Jersey, where he attended Columbia High School. Anxious to pursue a career in journalism, he continued his education at Ohio University in Athens. After graduating from Ohio University in 1971, he decided to switch careers and dedicate his life to boxing. He began with managing Bill "Dynamite" Douglas before spending 15 months under the tutelage of boxing trainer Angelo Dundee and Angelo's brother Chris, who was a promoter. The Dundee brothers, both Hall of Famers, groomed Trampler as a cornerman, trainer, publicist, and matchmaker. Between the years of 1977 and 1979 Trampler worked with legendary matchmaker Teddy Brenner at Madison Square Garden.

== Career ==
After leaving the Garden, Trampler lived in Phoenix for a year and handled fighters on the West Coast. In 1980, promoter Bob Arum offered Trampler a career at Top Rank, where he was reunited with his mentor Brenner in New York City. His continuous pursuit and keen eye for talent have helped the company become the engine it is today. For over 40 years, Trampler has remained with the company and has molded his roots as one of the sport's most prominent matchmakers. When Arum moved Top Rank to Las Vegas in 1986, Trampler went to Nevada with him. Citing Arum's creative vision, Top Rank developed boxing markets in Mexico, Puerto Rico, Macao, and the Philippines. On July 31, 2012, Yahoo Sports named Trampler among the 25 most powerful people in boxing.
