= William Reardon Smith =

English shipowner and philanthropist

Sir William Reardon Smith Bt JP DL
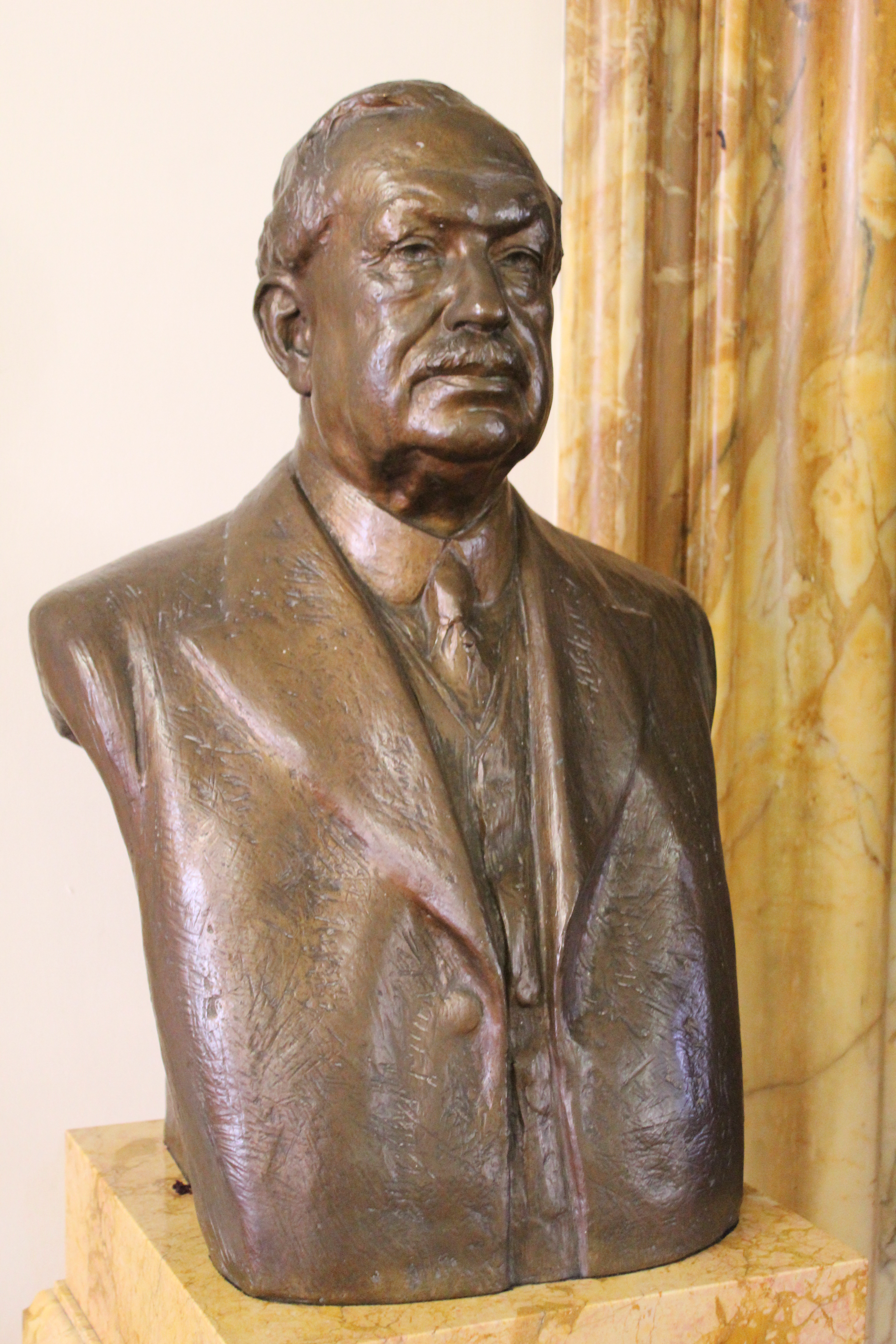
- Bust in the Cardiff City Hall
- Born: 7 August 1856; Appledore, Devon, England
- Died: 23 December 1935 (aged 79); Cornborough, Cardiff, Wales
- Occupations: Shipowner, philanthropist

Sir William Reardon Smith, 1st Baronet (7 August 1856 – 23 December 1935) was an English shipowner and philanthropist.

== Early life ==
Descended from Irish seafaring stock, he was born at Appledore, Devon, the youngest son of Thomas Reardon Smith, a merchant navy captain, and his wife Elizabeth (née Green). After her husband and eldest son Philip Green Smith were lost at sea when the schooner Hazard sank off the coast of South Wales in October 1859, his mother was forced to bring up her surviving eight children by herself on her income as a dressmaker.

Reardon Smith was educated at the Wesleyan day school in Appledore.

== Sea service ==
Reardon Smith went to sea at the age of 12, joining the crew of the 32-ton wooden sloop Unity as a cabin boy and served from August to December 1870. He then transferred to the 37-ton sloop Seraphina in Spring 1871, the 38-ton polacca brigantine Joe Abraham, from July to December 1871, the 965-ton Ocean Pearl, from February to July 1872, and the 460-ton Scout. Service on other ships followed during which he gained experience in the coastal trades of the Bristol Channel as well as carrying railway lines to the US and copper ore from Chile.

He climbed steadily through the ranks, reaching second mate by the age of 20 (after passing his examination on 11 August 1876) and then later became first mate of the barque May owned by Glasgow-based H. Hogarth & Sons in 1878. He remained with Hogarth for eighteen years, passing his Master Mariner's examination in Plymouth on 6 June 1879 and being sufficiently trusted by Hugh Hogarth to superintend the building of three of his ships. For his last four years at sea, Reardon Smith forsook Hogarth for the Cardiff-based Anning Brothers who had Devon connections and lastly William J. Tatem, who was born at Appledore.

Among the sailing and steamships he commanded were the Baron Douglas (June 1890 to April 1892), Baron Elibank (June 1890 to April 1892), Baron Belhaven (November 1894 to October 1896), Starcross (November 1896 to July 1897), Lady Lewis (July 1897 to April 1899, February to December 1900)) and Shandon (June 1899 to February 1900).

== Relocation to Cardiff ==
Sir William Reardon Smith & Sons' house flag

Reardon Smith came ashore in December 1900 and joined his wife Ellen (née Hamlyn), who had recently relocated the family from Devon to Cardiff.

Once settled in Cardiff, he entered into a partnership with William Seager, a Cardiff ship chandler, to establish the Tempus Shipping Co Ltd, which then ordered their first ship the Tempus. After the partnership broke up after little more than a year, Reardon Smith decided to go it alone.

In 1905, together with his elder son Willie, he founded his own company, W. R. Smith & Son Ltd, based in Cardiff. W. R. Smith & Son operated from 1905 to 1909 before being succeeded by W. R. Smith & Sons between 1909 and 1922, and then finally Sir W. R. Smith & Sons Ltd from 1923 onwards.

Reardon Smith followed the common practice of the time in Cardiff of expanding his fleet by floating separate public companies in which his privately owned W. R. Smith would take a share. This allowed him to tap new sources of capital while also reducing the liability. The first such company was the Instow Steamship Co Ltd, formed in 1905 with a proposed capital of £32,800. The company's first ship was City of Cardiff built by Ropner & Son at Stockton-on-Tees. Despite a large mortgage from the shipbuilder, Reardon Smith struggled to raise sufficient capital to pay for her. However, after the Holman family from Topsham in Devon showed their faith in him by buying a large number of shares the remainder were soon taken up. Following her delivery in March 1906, she was placed in the traditional exporting of coal and transporting back grain under the command of his brother John Smith with his son Harry serving as second mate. Under Reardon Smith's careful management, the vessel was profitable from the start with the first two voyages giving a return of 8% per share.

Instow's second vessel, the Leeds City was a trunk deck ship delivered in 1908 also by Ropner & Son.

In August 1909, Reardon Smith ordered the Bradford City from Ropner & Son. To pay for her, he floated the Bradford Steamship Co Ltd in 1910 with a nominal capital of £33,250. The company's name and that of the later Leeds Shipping Co Ltd was in reference to the many investors that he had signed up for his previous public company and hoped to continue to attract from Yorkshire. The company was subsequently amalgamated with the St Just Steamship Co Ltd in 1917.

The City of Cardiff was blown ashore at Nanjizal, not far from Land's End, in a ferocious gale on 12 March 1912. All 27 of the crew were saved. While staying at a hotel in St Just, as he assessed the wreck, Reardon Smith became aware that the area was a potential source of investors as there was still much wealth in the area inherited from the fortunes made from Cornish mining; As a result, in 1912 he established the St Just Steamship Co Ltd, with capital of £90,000. the venture was well supported. As the name Cornish City had already been bestowed on a second-hand purchase, the company's first ship was called Devon City. The company was later renamed the Reardon Smith Line in 1928 with a capital of £1,232,000.

In 1913, Reardon Smith established the Great City Steamship Co Ltd with capital of £60,000, which was subsequently amalgamated with the St Just Steamship Company in 1917 and wound up.

Reardon Smith's companies prospered, and by the outbreak of the First World War he owned nine tramp steamers, divided among five companies, with all engaged in the exporting of coal from south Wales.

== First World War ==
In 1916, the Instow Steamship Co Ltd was merged with the St Just Steamship Co Ltd in 1916 and the name was disestablished. In the early years of the War his fleet continued to expand, with ships ordered just prior to the War being delivered in 1915. However, as the War continued and it became almost impossible to order new ships, Reardon Smith purchased second-hand vessels to continue his expansion and to replace his losses due to enemy action.

In 1916, Reardon Smith bought the Coniston Water Steamship Co Ltd and its only vessel the Coniston Water. Following the sinking of the ship by U-87 on 21 July 1917, it was wound up in 1918.

A major purchase was that of eight ships of the London & Northern Steamship Co Ltd in early 1917. Although he had to pay a high price it was still worthwhile for as long as the war continued and in the immediate period afterwards the price of ships continued to increase. During the War, Reardon Smith was able to acquire a total of twelve more ships, but ten were lost.

== Post-WWI ==
Reardon Smith's wartime losses were initially replaced in 1919 when seven ships were acquired from the Swansea-based Letricheux & David Co. and then in 1920–21 by nine German vessels surrendered as War reparations which were purchased for £468,000. Immediately following the end of the War, there was a perceived shortage of ships due to wartime losses, whereas in reality, the total tonnage of the British merchant fleet in 1919 was only 700,000 gross tons less than it had been in 1913, while the worldwide merchant fleet had actually increased. Many ships were still operating on government wartime contracts far from their normal commercial trading routes, reducing the number available to service mercantile trade. From March 1919, the government began deregulating the shipping markets as it released ships from its service. In May 1919, HMG lowered the excess profit duty from 80 to 40 per cent. These factors in combination with post-war optimism lead to vastly inflated ship values to create a boom which lasted until the late spring of 1920.

This boom resulted in a massive increase from 1919 onwards, when 88 shipping company prospectuses were issued at Cardiff, fuelled by the belief that the freight rates which had been inflated by wartime requirements would continue indefinitely. Reardon Smith was not immune to such a belief, and in August 1919 floated the Leeds Shipping Company, followed in October by the Cornborough Shipping Line, both with a massive nominal capital of £400,000. While both companies were well subscribed, both had to pay very high prices to acquire ships.

By 1921 the good times were over, with shipowners chasing maritime trade that had decreased by 20 per cent since 1913. The resulting shipping recession was to run almost to the outbreak of the Second World War. Despite the grim economic outlook, Reardon Smith misjudged the market and continued to expand, establishing the Oakwin Shipping Co. Ltd in 1920 with capital of £100,000. In 1926, its ships were transferred to the St Just Steamship Company. As a result of this transfer of assets, the Oakwin became the largest shareholder in the St Just. Expansion still continued, with the Unity Shipping & Trading Co. Ltd being created in September 1921 with capital of £30,000 to operate only one ship, the Meropi, which had been purchased from Greek shipowner C. D. Calafatis. When this was sold in 1929 to C. M. Lemos, the company was wound up.

In 1921, Reardon Smith also established the Reardon Smith Line with capital of £1,000. It was renamed the Reardon Smith Navigation Co Ltd in May 1928 following the renaming of the St Just Steamship Co Ltd.

By 1922, the fleet had increased to 39 vessels trading worldwide and operated by six Reardon Smith companies, which made it the largest Cardiff shipping company.

As a result of the collapse of freight rates, both the Leeds and Cornborough had financial problems which led to the Cornborough collapsing in 1923 with liabilities of over £400,000, and yet its eight ships only had a combined value of £190,000. Two ships were sold, two transferred to the Oakwin Shipping Co and the remainder transferred to the St Just Steamship Co. In response to what had been his most disastrous maritime venture, Reardon Smith offered as compensation one share from his personal shareholding in the financially sound St Just Steamship Co Ltd for every three Cornborough shares. In December 1923, the offer, which was worth £48,000, was accepted by the Cornborough shareholders.

In June 1923, Reardon Smith established Reardon Smith (Union of South Africa) Ltd with capital of £250,000. In 1926, he was a founding member of the Honourable Company of Master Mariners.

In the late 1920s, in response to the continued deterioration in maritime trade, Reardon Smith began to reduce the size of his fleet, with seventeen of the older ships eventually being sold. He did, however, purchase some replacements including four motor ships. The Reardon Smith Line started a regular service from Great Britain to the West Coast of the United States.

To reduce costs, the downturn gave a stimulus to innovation, and in particular to use of the marine diesel engine. Despite British tramp owners being notoriously distrustful of foreign-designed machinery, Reardon Smith eventually ordered two motor ships and had delivered in 1928 the East Lynn from William Doxford and the West Lynn from Napier & Miller. While the former had four-cylinder Doxford engines, the latter had six-cylinder engines from Harland & Wolff/Burmeister & Wain. While both vessels gave very satisfactory service, the Doxford engines proved to be superior, leading to the building of seven more Doxford diesel-engined motor ships before the outbreak of the Second World War.

In 1928, Reardon Smith established a pension fund for his seagoing staff employees and later extended it to cover all employees.

Reardon Smith died peacefully in his eightieth year after a short illness on the evening of 23 December 1935 at his home, Cornborough in Cardiff, surrounded by his family. In his will he left over £200,000. By the time of Reardon Smith's death in 1935, his various business interests owned twenty-eight ships. In addition to his direct business interests, Reardon Smith had also served at various times on the boards of numerous maritime related organisations and businesses.

Sir William was buried at Cathays Cemetery in Cardiff.

== Philanthropy ==
Reardon Smith had a great sentimental attachment to his birthplace of Appledore. Up until the Second World War, all of the working boats and lifeboats for the company's new ships were built by long-established Appledore boat builders. Once finished, the boats were rowed on the flood tide up the River Torridge to Bideford and then taken from the water and transported by rail to the shipyard constructing the new ship.

In the latter part of his life, Reardon Smith gave generously to hospitals in Bideford and Cardiff. Other donations were made to the Exeter University and the National Library of Wales.

Early in 1921, Reardon Smith launched an appeal amongst his fellow shipowners at Cardiff to fund the establishment, initially within Cardiff Technical College, of a department which would provide training for boys between the ages of 13 and 16 whose ambitions were set upon a career at sea. By the end of March 1921, he had collected the considerable sum of £18,000. As a result, on 3 October of that year, the Smith Junior Nautical School accepted its first cadets. Four years later, he acquired a large yacht, the Margherita, which after being given a three-mast rig and two diesel engines served as both a family yacht and a cadet training vessel. Having served on sailing vessels, Reardon Smith believed that pre-sea training under sail was beneficial for cadets. The Wall Street crash of 1929 and subsequent Great Depression meant the Margherita was sold in 1932.

Reardon Smith was a major benefactor to the National Museum of Wales and served as its Treasurer (1925–1928) and President (1928–1932). During his involvement with Amgueddfa Cymru – Museum Wales, Sir William transformed the museum's poor finances and oversaw the completion of its east wing at Cardiff. As a result, the east wing's new lecture theatre was named the Reardon Smith Lecture Theatre in his honour in 1932. Between 1915 and 1935, he and his wife Ellen (Lady Smith) donated approximately £50,000 to AC-NMW. In addition to his personal donations, Sir William also worked tirelessly to raise funds from elsewhere.

== Personal life ==
On 16 May 1880, Reardon Smith married Ellen Hamlyn. They had six children: Lillian "Lily" Nellie Smith, Gertrude "Gertie" Smith, Elizabeth Hamlyn Smith, Grace Hamlyn Smith, Sir Willie Reardon-Smith (26 May 1887 – 24 November 1950) and Douglas Reardon Smith (10 April 1894 – 6 June 1961)

== Honours ==
In recognition of his philanthropy, Reardon Smith was awarded the Honorary Freedom of the City of Cardiff in 1928. He served as a Justice of the Peace and was appointed a Deputy Lieutenant for Glamorganshire.

He was created a baronet in the 1920 Birthday Honours "for services to shipping during the First World War". Although, at the time, Lloyd George was selling baronetcies for £15,000 and Cardiff had the reputation of being the "city of dreadful knights", there is no conclusive evidence that Reardon Smith paid for his title. He was succeeded in the baronetcy by his elder son, Willie.

In 1932, Reardon Smith was admitted as a Freeman of the City of London, becoming a Liveryman of the Worshipful Company of Shipwrights.

== Legacy ==
There is a bust of Sir William Reardon Smith by Sir Goscombe John at Cardiff City Hall.

== Footnotes ==
Baronetage of the United Kingdom
New creation	Baronet (of Appledore); 1920–1935	Succeeded by William Reardon Smith
