= The Hotel Casey =

Former hotel in Pennsylvania, United States

The Hotel Casey was a famous hotel located in Scranton, Pennsylvania. Built in 1909 and demolished in 2001, the hotel stood for over 90 years. The hotel was built by Patrick J. and Andrew J. Casey (both successful brewers and bankers) for approximately $1,000,000. Construction began in 1909 and was completed in 1910. Charles R. Weatherhogg of Fort Wayne, Indiana, was the architect. The hotel formally opened on January 21, 1911. At the time it was the largest hotel in northeastern Pennsylvania with eleven stories and 250 rooms.

It was considered a landmark of the city of Scranton and one of the top hotels in the Northeastern United States. The former site of the hotel now houses a parking garage and restaurant.
