= List of British Jewish sportspeople =

This is a list of notable Jewish British sportspeople. For other British Jews, see List of British Jews; for Jewish sportspeople from other countries, see List of Jews in sport.

== Association football ==
- Nick Blackman, Barbados International
- Chris Cohen, Assistant manager of Lincoln City and former player
- George Cohen, Fulham and England's 1966 World Cup team, full back
- Bradley Goldberg, England, forward
- Joe Jacobson, Wales, left back (Wycombe Wanderers)
- Scott Kashket, England, striker for Sutton United F.C.
- Josh Kennet, England, midfielder/right back (Maccabi Herzliya)
- Mark Lazarus, England, right winger
- Tom Rosenthal.

== Boxing ==
- Barney Aaron (Young), English-born US lightweight, Hall of Fame
- Jackie Kid Berg, Junior Welterweight Champion (IBHOF), wore a Star of David on his trunks
- Roman Greenberg, IBO intercontinental heavyweight champion
- Gary Jacobs, Scottish, British, Commonwealth, and European (EBU) champion welterweight
- Ted "Kid" Lewis (Gershon Mendeloff), world welterweight champion 1915–16, 1917–19
- Daniel Mendoza, 18th-century heavyweight world champion, family relative of actor Peter Sellers and Mike Mendoza (talksport), radio and television presenter
- Dutch Sam (Samuel Elias), boxing pioneer known as "The Terrible Jew"
- Young Dutch Sam, bare-knuckle boxing pioneer
- Sid Smith, world flyweight champion in 1913
- Matt Wells, lightweight and welterweight champion, in 1911 and 1914
- Charley White (Charles Anchowitz), lightweight boxer from 1906 until 1923

== Cricket ==
- Mike Barnard, England, cricketer
- Mark Bott, England, cricketer
- Darren Gerard, England, cricketer
- Steven Herzberg, English-born Australian, cricketer
- Bev Lyon, England, cricketer
- Dar Lyon, England, cricketer (brother of Bev)
- John Raphael, England, batsman
- Fred Trueman, cricketer (Jewish ancestry)

== Fencing ==
- Allan Jay, British (épée and foil), Olympic two-time silver, world champion
- Edgar Seligman (1867–1958), British (épée, foil, and sabre), Olympic two-time silver (épée), two-time British champion in each weapon

== Motorsport ==
- Woolf Barnato, British racing driver, financier and cricketer, three-time winner of the 24 Hours of Le Mans
- Sheila van Damm, British rally driver

== Rowing ==
- Zoe De Toledo, Olympic medalist
- Josh West, American-born British, men's eight, Olympic silver, 2x World Rowing Championships silver and one bronze

== Rugby league ==
- Lewis Harris, England, English rugby league

== Rugby union ==
- Aaron Liffchak, England, prop, England national team
- Alan Menter, England/South Africa, South Africa national team
- John Raphael, Belgium/England, England national team

== Sailing ==
- Tony Bullimore, Britain, yachtsman
- Peter Jaffe, Britain, Olympic silver (yachting; star-class)

== Table tennis ==
- Viktor Barna (born "Győző Braun"), Hungary/Britain, 22-time world champion, International Table Tennis Foundation Hall of Fame (ITTFHoF)
- Richard Bergmann, Austria/Britain, seven-time world champion, ITTFHoF
- Benny Casofsky, English Swaythling Cup player
- Jeff Ingber
- Hyman Lurie, English three-time world bronze medallist
- Irene Ogus, world bronze medallist
- Ivor Montagu, Britain, national team

== Tennis ==
- Angela Buxton, England, won 1956 French Women's Doubles (w/Althea Gibson) and 1956 Wimbledon Women's Doubles (w/Gibson), highest world ranking # 9
- Daniel Prenn, Germany and Britain, highest world ranking, #6

== Track and field ==
- Harold Abrahams, Britain, sprinter, Olympic champion (100-metre sprint) and silver (4×100-m relay) who was immortalized in the film Chariots of Fire
- Sir Sidney Abrahams, Britain, Olympic long jumper
- Jo Ankier, Britain, record holder (1,500m & 3,000m steeplechase)
- David Jacobs, first British Jew to win Olympic gold.
- Harry Kane, Britain, Olympic hurdler

== Weightlifting ==
- Ben Helfgott, Polish-born British, three-time British champion (lightweight), three-time Maccabiah champion; survived Buchenwald and Theresienstadt concentration camps, as all but one other of his family were killed by the Nazis
- Edward Lawrence Levy, Britain, world weightlifting champion; 14 world records

== Wrestling ==
- Noam Dar, Israeli-born Scottish wrestler
- Fred Oberlander, Austrian, British, and Canadian wrestler; world champion (freestyle heavyweight); Maccabiah champion
- Samuel Rabin, Britain, Olympic bronze (freestyle middleweight)

== Other sports ==
- Ludwig Guttmann, founder of the Paralympics
- David Pleat, former football manager
- Barry Silkman, footballer and agent
- David Triesman, former chairman of the Football Association
