= International Boxing Hall of Fame =

International Boxing Hall of Fame (IBHOF)
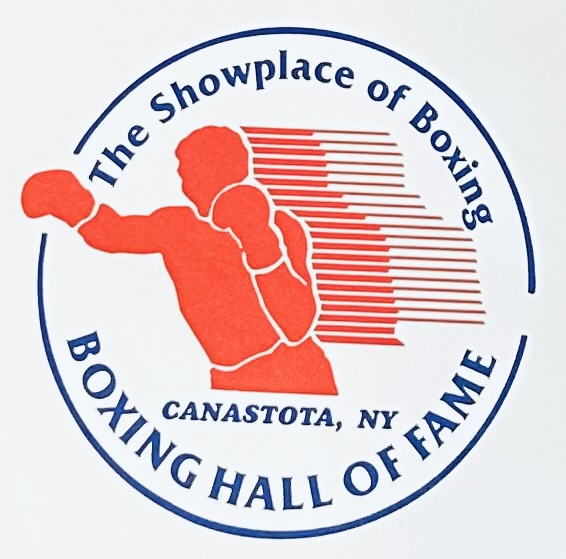
- Established: 1989
- Location: 1 Hall of Fame Drive, Canastota, New York 13032
- Type: Hall of Fame
- Key holdings: Madison Square Garden Boxing Ring
- Executive director: Edward P. Brophy
- Website: ibhof.com

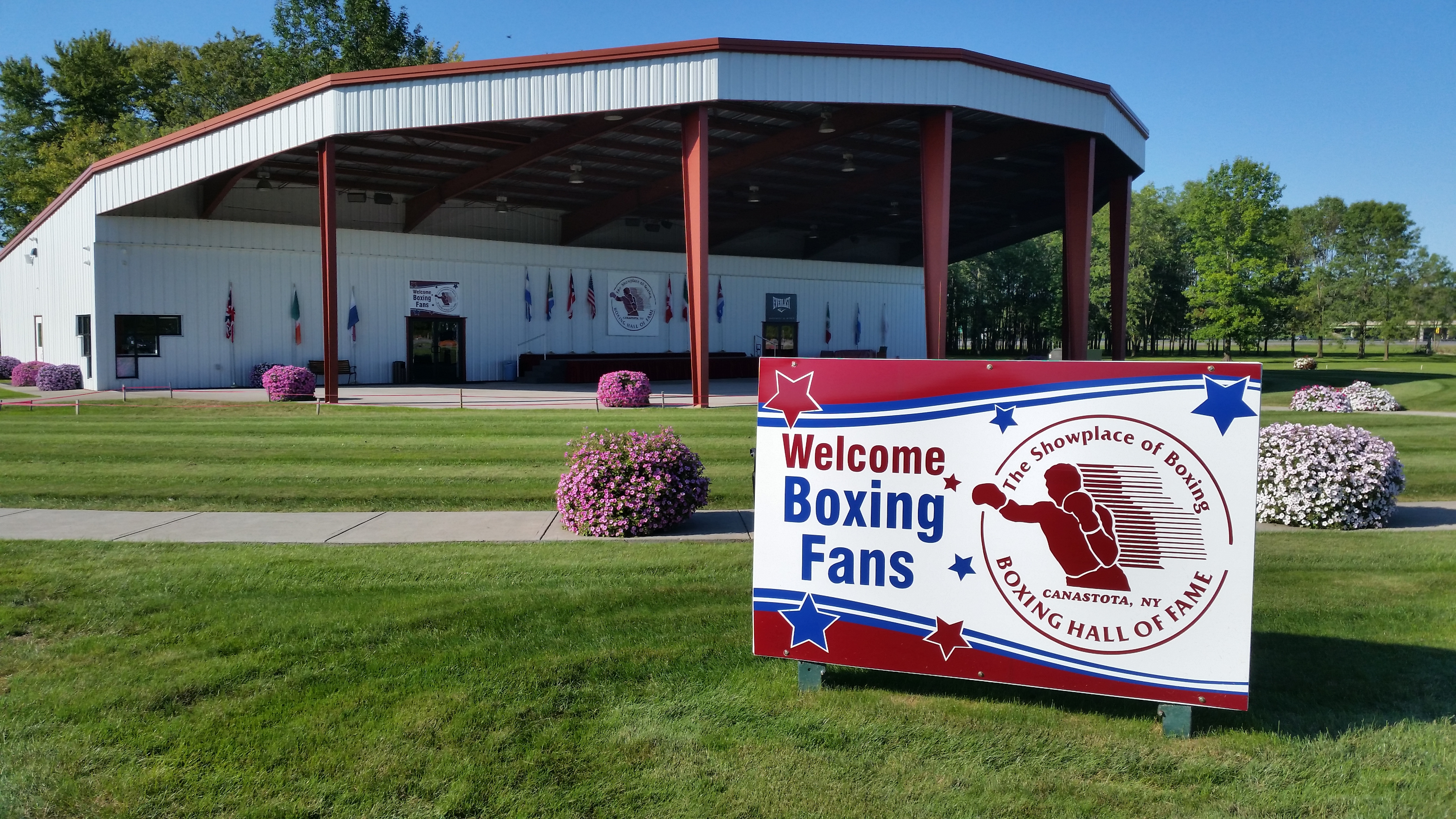
International Boxing Hall of Fame, Canastota, New York

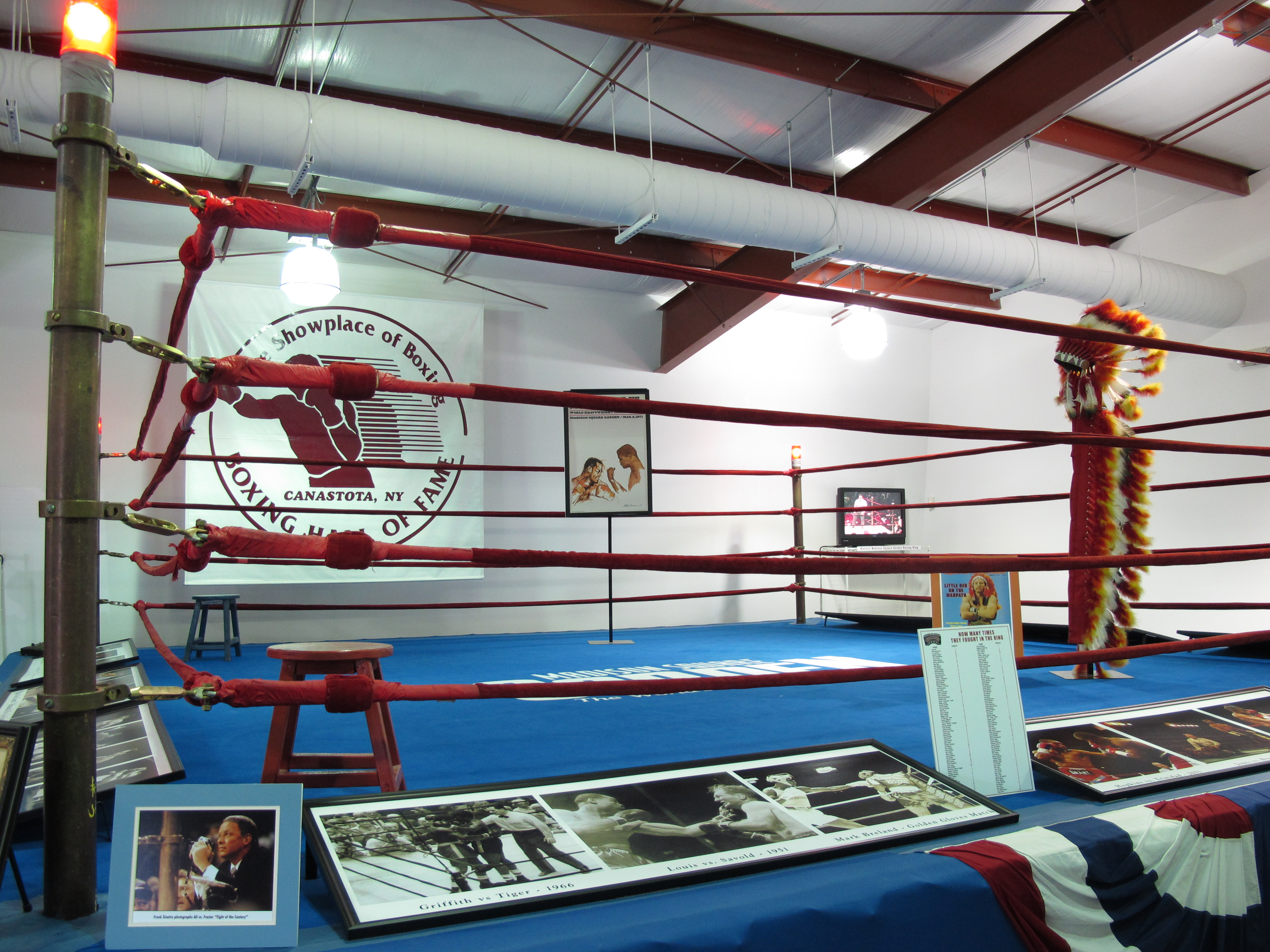
The iconic boxing ring, used at Madison Square Garden (1925–2007), rests inside the pavilion on the grounds of the International Boxing Hall of Fame

The International Boxing Hall of Fame (IBHOF), located in Canastota, New York, adjacent to exit 34 of the New York State Thruway, honors boxers, trainers and other contributors to the sport worldwide. Inductees are selected on ballots created through screened public nominations by members of the Boxing Writers Association of America.

The IBHOF started as a 1980s initiative by Ed Brophy to honor Canastota's world boxing champions, Carmen Basilio and Basilio's nephew, Billy Backus; the village of Canastota inaugurated the new museum in 1989 which showcases boxing's rich history. With the opening of the Oneida Indian Nation's Turning Stone Casino in the nearby city of Verona in the early 90s, a relationship was developed whereas various IBHOF Hall of Fame Weekend events were hosted at the casino. Today, the IBHOF is visited by boxing fans from all over the world.

An earlier hall had been created in 1954, when The Ring magazine's Boxing Hall of Fame was launched, located at Madison Square Garden in New York City. When that Boxing Hall of Fame was disbanded in 1987, it had a total of 155 inductees. As of November 2018, all but 13 of those 155 have also been inducted into the IBHOF. In 2002, boxing promoter Aileen Eaton became the first woman inducted into the IBHOF. Beginning in 2020, the IBHOF began inducting female boxers for the first time since its inception.

Ceremonies have been held every second Sunday in June since 1990 to honor inductees but were postponed in 2020 and 2021 due to COVID-19. Events are attended by many former world boxing champions, as well as boxing and Hollywood celebrities. Artist Richard T. Slone has been the official artist of the IBHOF since 1997, creating portraits of inductees and other works for the Hall.

== Eligibility ==
All professional boxers become eligible for election into the International Boxing Hall of Fame three years after their retirement (previously used to be five years before 2019). Inductees are selected by members of the Boxing Writers Association of America and an international panel of boxing historians, based on criteria in five separate categories:

- Modern: Retired boxers whose last bout was no earlier than 1989. Prior to a 2014 rule change, the category reflected boxers whose last bout was after 1943.
- Old Timers: Until 2014, the rule was boxers whose last bout was no earlier than 1893 and no later than 1942. This category has since changed, similar to the Veterans Committee in baseball's Hall of Fame. It is now split into two categories.
  - Early Era: Boxers who fought from the beginning of Marquis of Queensbury Rules (1893) until 1942.
  - Late Era: Boxers who fought their last bout from 1943 to 1988
- Pioneers: Boxers whose last bout was in or prior to 1892. Generally, they are boxers who fought before the Marquis of Queensbury Rules.
- Observers: Journalists, historians, writers and artists.
- Non-Participants: People who made contributions to the sport of boxing apart from their roles as boxers or observers.

== Inductees ==
=== Modern ===
Year	Inductees	Record	Nationality
1990	Muhammad Ali	56–5 (37 KO)	United States
1990	Henry Armstrong	151–21–9 (101 KO)	United States
1990	Carmen Basilio	56–16–7 (27 KO)	United States
1990	Ezzard Charles	93–25–1 (52 KO)	United States
1990	Billy Conn	64–11–1 (15 KO)	United States
1990	Bob Foster	56–8–1 (46 KO)	United States
1990	Joe Frazier	32–4–1 (27 KO)	United States
1990	Kid Gavilán	108–30–5 (28 KO)	Cuba
1990	Emile Griffith	85–24–2 (23 KO)	United States Virgin Islands
1990	Jake LaMotta	83–19–4 (30 KO)	United States
1990	Joe Louis	66–3 (52 KO)	United States
1990	Rocky Marciano	49–0 (43 KO)	United States
1990	Carlos Monzón	87–3–9 (59 KO)	Argentina
1990	Archie Moore	185–23–10 (131 KO)	United States
1990	José Nápoles	81–7 (54 KO)	Cuba; Mexico
1990	Willie Pep	229–11–1 (65 KO)	United States
1990	Sugar Ray Robinson	173–19–6 (108 KO)	United States
1990	Sandy Saddler	144–16–2 (103 KO)	United States
1990	Jersey Joe Walcott	49–21–1 (31 KO)	United States
1990	Ike Williams	127–24–4 (61 KO)	United States
1991	Marcel Cerdan	119–4 (65 KO)	France
1991	Gene Fullmer	55–6–3 (24 KO)	United States
1991	Rocky Graziano	67–10–6 (52 KO)	United States
1991	Beau Jack	91–24–5 (44 KO)	United States
1991	Sonny Liston	50–4 (39 KO)	United States
1991	Rubén Olivares	89–13–3 (79 KO)	Mexico
1991	Carlos Ortiz	61–7–1 (30 KO)	Puerto Rico
1991	Floyd Patterson	55–8–1 (40 KO)	United States
1991	Salvador Sánchez	44–1–1 (32 KO)	Mexico
1991	Dick Tiger	60–19–3 (27 KO)	Nigeria
1991	Tony Zale	67–18–2 (45 KO)	United States
1992	Alexis Argüello	77–8 (72 KO)	Nicaragua
1992	Nino Benvenuti	82–7–1 (35 KO)	Italy
1992	Charley Burley	83–12–2 (50 KO)	United States
1992	Billy Graham	102–15–9 (27 KO)	United States
1992	Éder Jofre	72–2–4 (50 KO)	Brazil
1992	Ken Norton	42–7–1 (33 KO)	United States
1992	Max Schmeling	56–10–4 (40 KO)	Germany
1993	Gabriel Elorde	89–27–2 (33 KO)	Philippines
1993	Joey Giardello	100–26–8 (33 KO)	United States
1993	Marvelous Marvin Hagler	62–3–2 (52 KO)	United States
1993	Harold Johnson	76–11 (32 KO)	United States
1993	Fritzie Zivic	158–65–9 (82 KO)	United States
1994	Jack Kid Berg	157–26–9 (61 KO)	England
1994	Joey Maxim	82–29–4 (21 KO)	United States
1994	Michael Spinks	31–1 (21 KO)	United States
1994	Carlos Zárate	66–4 (63 KO)	Mexico
1995	Wilfredo Gómez	44–3–1 (42 KO)	Puerto Rico
1995	Fighting Harada	55–7 (22 KO)	Japan
1995	Bob Montgomery	75–19–3 (37 KO)	United States
1995	Pascual Pérez	84–7–1 (57 KO)	Argentina
1996	Wilfred Benítez	53–8–1 (31 KO)	Puerto Rico
1996	Joe Brown	116–47–13 (53 KO)	United States
1996	Manuel Ortiz	100–28–3 (54 KO)	United States
1996	Aaron Pryor	39–1 (35 KO)	United States
1997	Sugar Ray Leonard	36–3–1 (25 KO)	United States
1997	Luis Manuel Rodríguez	107–13 (49 KO)	Cuba
1997	José Torres	41–3–1 (29 KO)	Puerto Rico
1997	Chalky Wright	159–43–18 (82 KO)	United States
1998	Sammy Angott	94–29–8 (22 KO)	United States
1998	Miguel Canto	61–9–4 (15 KO)	Mexico
1998	Antonio Cervantes	91–12–3 (45 KO)	Colombia
1998	Matthew Saad Muhammad	39–16–3 (29 KO)	United States
1999	Jimmy Bivins	86–25–1 (31 KO)	United States
1999	Khaosai Galaxy	50–1 (44 KO)	Thailand
1999	Lew Jenkins	73–41–5 (51 KO)	United States
1999	Eusebio Pedroza	41–6–1 (25 KO)	Panama
1999	Vicente Saldivar	37–3 (26 KO)	Mexico
2000	Ken Buchanan	61–8 (27 KO)	Scotland
2000	Jimmy Carter	81–31–9 (32 KO)	United States
2000	Jeff Chandler	33–2–2 (18 KO)	United States
2000	Bobo Olson	97–16–2 (47 KO)	United States
2001	Ismael Laguna	65–9–1 (37 KO)	Panama
2001	László Papp	27–0–2 (15 KO)	Hungary
2001	Willie Pastrano	62–13–8 (14 KO)	United States
2001	Sugar Ramos	55–7–4 (40 KO)	Cuba; Mexico
2001	Randolph Turpin	66–8–1 (45 KO)	England
2002	José "Pipino" Cuevas	35–15 (31 KO)	Mexico
2002	Jeff Fenech	29–3–1 (21 KO)	Australia
2002	Víctor Galíndez	55–9–4 (34 KO)	Argentina
2002	Ingemar Johansson	26–2 (17 KO)	Sweden
2003	Fred Apostoli	61–10–1 (31 KO)	United States
2003	Curtis Cokes	62–14–4 (30 KO)	United States
2003	George Foreman	76–5 (68 KO)	United States
2003	Nicolino Locche	117–4–14 (14 KO)	Argentina
2003	Mike McCallum	49–5–1 (36 KO)	Jamaica
2004	Azumah Nelson	39–6–2 (28 KO)	Ghana
2004	Carlos Palomino	31–4–3 (19 KO)	Mexico
2004	Dwight Muhammad Qawi	41–11–1 (25 KO)	United States
2004	Daniel Zaragoza	55–8–3 (28 KO)	Mexico
2005	Bobby Chacon	59–7–1 (47 KO)	United States
2005	Duilio Loi	115–3–8 (26 KO)	Italy
2005	Barry McGuigan	32–3 (28 KO)	Ireland
2005	Terry Norris	47–9 (31 KO)	United States
2006	Michael Carbajal	49–4 (33 KO)	United States
2006	Humberto González	43–3 (30 KO)	Mexico
2006	Edwin Rosario	47–6 (41 KO)	Puerto Rico
2007	Roberto Durán	103–16 (70 KO)	Panama
2007	Ricardo López	51–0–1 (38 KO)	Mexico
2007	Pernell Whitaker	40–4–1 (17 KO)	United States
2008	Larry Holmes	69–6 (44 KO)	United States
2008	Eddie Perkins	74–20–2 (21 KO)	United States
2008	Holman Williams	146–30–11 (36 KO)	United States
2009	Orlando Canizales	50–5–1 (37 KO)	United States
2009	Lennox Lewis	41–2–1 (32 KO)	England; Canada
2009	Brian Mitchell	45–1–3 (21 KO)	South Africa
2010	Chang Jung-koo	38–4 (17 KO)	South Korea
2010	Danny Lopez	42–6 (39 KO)	United States
2010	Lloyd Marshall	70–25–4 (36 KO)	United States
2011	Julio César Chávez	107–6–2 (86 KO)	Mexico
2011	Kostya Tszyu	31–2 (25 KO)	Russia; Australia
2011	Mike Tyson	50–6 (44 KO)	United States
2012	Herbert Hardwick	176–56–10 (48 KO)	Puerto Rico
2012	Thomas Hearns	61–5–1 (48 KO)	United States
2012	Mark Johnson	44–5 (28 KO)	United States
2013	Arturo Gatti	40–9 (31 KO)	Canada
2013	Virgil Hill	49–7 (23 KO)	United States
2013	Yuh Myung-woo	38–1 (14 KO)	South Korea
2014	Joe Calzaghe	46–0 (32 KO)	Wales
2014	Oscar De La Hoya	39–6 (30 KO)	United States; Mexico
2014	Félix Trinidad	42–3 (35 KO)	Puerto Rico
2015	Naseem Hamed	36–1 (31 KO)	England; Yemen
2015	Riddick Bowe	43–1 (33 KO)	United States
2015	Ray Mancini	29–5 (23 KO)	United States
2016	Héctor Camacho	79–6–3 (38 KO)	Puerto Rico
2016	Lupe Pintor	56–14–2 (42 KO)	Mexico
2016	Hilario Zapata	43–10–1 (15 KO)	Panama
2017	Marco Antonio Barrera	67–7 (44 KO)	Mexico
2017	Evander Holyfield	44–10–2 (29 KO)	United States
2017	Johnny Tapia	59–5–2 (30 KO)	United States
2018	Vitali Klitschko	45–2 (41 KO)	Ukraine
2018	Erik Morales	52–9 (36 KO)	Mexico
2018	Winky Wright	51–6–1 (25 KO)	United States
2019	Donald Curry	34–6 (25 KO)	United States
2019	Julian Jackson	55–6 (49 KO)	United States Virgin Islands
2019	Buddy McGirt	73–6–1 (48 KO)	United States
2020	Bernard Hopkins	55–8–2 (32 KO)	United States
2020	Juan Manuel Márquez	56–7–1 (40 KO)	Mexico
2020	Shane Mosley	49–10–1 (41 KO)	United States
2021	Wladimir Klitschko	64–5 (53 KO)	Ukraine
2021	Floyd Mayweather Jr.	50–0 (27 KO)	United States
2021	Andre Ward	32–0 (16 KO)	United States
2022	Miguel Cotto	41–6 (33 KO)	Puerto Rico
2022	Roy Jones Jr.	66–9 (47 KO)	United States
2022	James Toney	77–10–3 (47 KO)	United States
2023	Timothy Bradley	33–2–1–1 (13 KO)	United States
2023	Carl Froch	33–2 (24 KO)	England
2023	Rafael Márquez	41–9 (37 KO)	Mexico
2024	Ricky Hatton	45–3 (32 KO)	England
2024	Michael Moorer	52–4–1 (40 KO)	United States
2024	Iván Calderón	35–3–1 (6 KO)	Puerto Rico
2024	Diego Corrales	40–5 (33 KO)	United States
2025	Manny Pacquiao	62–8–3 (39 KO)	Philippines
2025	Vinny Pazienza	50–10 (30 KO)	United States
2025	Michael Nunn	58–4 (38 KO)	United States
2026	Gennady Golovkin	42–2–1 (37 KO)	Kazakhstan
2026	Nigel Benn	42–5–1 (35 KO)	England
2026	Antonio Tarver	31–6–1–1 (22 KO)	United States

=== Old Timers ===
Records per ibhof.com unless otherwise stated.

Year	Inductees	Record	Nationality
1990	Abe Attell	91–9–18 (53 KO); 51 ND; 2 NC	United States
1990	Jack Britton	104–27–21 (28 KO); 190 ND; 2 NC	United States
1990	Tony Canzoneri	137–24–10 (44 KO); 4 ND	United States
1990	James J. Corbett	11–4–3 (7 KO); 1 NC	United States
1990	Jack Dempsey	61–6–8 (50 KO); 6 ND	United States
1990	George Dixon	50–26–44 (27 KO); 7 ND; 3 NC	Canada
1990	Jim Driscoll	52–3–6 (35 KO); 8 ND	Wales
1990	Bob Fitzsimmons	74–8–3 (67 KO); 60 ND	England; New Zealand
1990	Joe Gans	120–8–9 (85 KO); 18 ND	United States
1990	Harry Greb	105–8–3 (48 KO); 183 ND	United States
1990	Peter Jackson	45–4–5 (30 KO); 31 ND	Australia
1990	James J. Jeffries	18–1–2 (15 KO)	United States
1990	Jack Johnson	77–13–14 (48 KO); 19 ND	United States
1990	Stanley Ketchel	52–4–4 (49 KO); 4 ND	United States
1990	Sam Langford	167–38–37 (117 KO); 48 ND; 3 NC	Canada
1990	Benny Leonard	85–5–1 (69 KO); 121 ND	United States
1990	Terry McGovern	60–4–4 (42 KO); 10 ND	United States
1990	Barney Ross	72–4–3 (22 KO); 2 ND	United States
1990	Gene Tunney	61–1–1 (45 KO); 19 ND; 1 NC	United States
1990	Mickey Walker	93–19–4 (60 KO); 46 ND; 1 NC	United States
1990	Jimmy Wilde	131–3–2 (99 KO); 13 ND	Wales
1991	Georges Carpentier	88–14–6 (56 KO); 1 ND	France
1991	Kid Chocolate	131–9–6 (50 KO)	Cuba
1991	Johnny Dundee	90–31–19 (22 KO); 194 ND; 1 NC	United States
1991	Young Griffo	63–9–37 (32 KO); 110 ND	Australia
1991	Tommy Loughran	94–23–9 (17 KO); 45 ND; 1 NC	United States
1991	Charles McCoy	86–6–6 (64 KO); 6 ND; 3 NC	United States
1991	Jimmy McLarnin	62–11–3 (20 KO); 1 ND	Canada; Ireland
1991	Tommy Ryan	86–3–6 (22 KO); 4 ND; 6 NC	Canada
1991	Joe Walcott	92–25–24 (58 KO); 21 ND; 2 NC	Barbados
1992	Lou Ambers	90–8–6 (30 KO)	United States
1992	Al Brown	123–18–10 (55 KO); 4 ND	Panama
1992	Jack "Nonpareil" Dempsey	50–3–8 (26 KO); 3 NC	Ireland; United States
1992	Mike Gibbons	62–3–4 (38 KO); 58 ND	United States
1992	Packey McFarland	64–1–5 (47 KO); 34 ND	United States
1992	Battling Nelson	59–19–19 (38 KO)	Denmark
1992	Harry Wills	65–8–2 (47 KO); 25 ND; 3 NC	United States
1993	Les Darcy	45–4 (29 KO)	Australia
1993	Tiger Flowers	115–14–6 (53 KO); 21 ND; 1 NC	United States
1993	Tommy Gibbons	57–4–1 (47 KO); 43 ND; 1 NC	United States
1993	Maxie Rosenbloom	210–38–26 (19 KO); 23 ND; 2 NC	United States
1994	John Henry Lewis	103–8–6 (60 KO)	United States
1994	Philadelphia Jack O'Brien	100–6–16 (57 KO); 57 ND	United States
1994	Jack Sharkey	38–13–3 (14 KO); 1 ND	Lithuania; United States
1994	Pancho Villa	77–4–4 (22 KO); 17 ND	Philippines
1995	Max Baer	72–12 (53 KO)	United States
1995	Jack Dillon	94–7–14 (64 KO); 129 ND; 1 NC	United States
1995	Johnny Kilbane	51–4–7 (25 KO); 78 ND; 2 NC	United States
1995	Jack McAuliffe	30–0–5 (22 KO); 1 ND	Ireland; United States
1996	Tommy Burns	46–5–8 (37 KO); 1 ND	Canada
1996	Jack Delaney	77–10–2 (44 KO)	Canada
1996	Fidel LaBarba	70–15–6 (16 KO); 4 ND	United States
1996	Young Stribling	221–12–14 (125 KO)	United States
1996	Kid Williams	104–17–9 (55 KO); 71 ND; 1 NC	Ukraine
1997	Pete Herman	67–12–8 (21 KO); 57 ND	United States
1997	Joe Jeanette	79–9–6 (66 KO); 62 ND; 1 NC	United States
1997	Freddie Miller	208–28–7 (42 KO); 1 ND; 4 NC	United States
1997	Freddie Welsh	76–4–6 (32 KO); 82 ND	Wales
1998	Joe Choynski	50–14–6 (25 KO); 8 ND; 1 NC	United States
1998	Frankie Genaro	82–21–8 (19 KO); 19 ND	United States
1998	George Lavigne	35–6–10 (19 KO); 5 ND	United States
1998	Benny Lynch	83–13–15 (34 KO)	Scotland
1998	Sammy Mandell	82–21–9 (32 KO); 73 ND; 2 NC	United States
1999	Johnny Coulon	52–6–4 (30 KO); 30 ND; 1 NC	Canada
1999	Sam McVey	63–12–7 (48 KO); 13 ND; 2 NC	United States
1999	Freddie Steele	120–4–9 (60 KO); 9 ND; 1 NC	United States
1999	Lew Tendler	59–11–2 (38 KO); 96 ND; 1 NC	United States
2000	Jimmy Barry	59–0–9 (39 KO); 2 NC	United States
2000	Battling Levinsky	77–19–15 (34 KO); 178 ND	United States
2000	Billy Petrolle	83–21–10 (62 KO); 45 ND; 1 NC	United States
2000	Ad Wolgast	60–12–13 (40 KO); 49 ND	United States
2001	Paul Berlenbach	39–8–3 (33 KO); 1 ND; 1 NC	United States
2001	James J. Braddock	46–23–4 (27 KO); 11 ND; 2 NC	Ireland; United States
2001	Billy Papke	37–11–6 (30 KO); 8 ND	United States
2001	Midget Wolgast	149–35–16 (16 KO); 12 ND	United States
2002	Benny Bass	152–28–5 (69 KO); 52 ND; 2 NC	Ukraine; United States
2002	Sixto Escobar	46–23–3 (22 KO)	Puerto Rico
2002	Harry Harris	38–2–7 (14 KO); 5 ND	United States
2002	Dixie Kid	80–29–12 (58 KO); 30 ND; 3 NC	United States
2002	Charley Mitchell	31–3–12 (7 KO); 1 NC	England
2002	Owen Moran	67–16–5 (34 KO); 19 ND	England
2003	Battling Battalino	57–26–3 (23 KO); 1 NC	United States
2003	Louis Kaplan	104–18–12 (25 KO); 19 ND	Ukraine; United States
2003	Tom Sharkey	40–6–5 (37 KO); 1 ND; 2 NC	United States
2003	Jess Willard	24–6–1 (21 KO); 5 ND	United States
2004	Baby Arizmendi	70–26–13 (12 KO)	Mexico
2004	Young Corbett III	124–12–15 (32 KO)	Italy; United States
2004	Jackie Fields	72–9–2 (31 KO); 2 ND; 1 NC	United States
2004	Willie Ritchie	37–8–12 (9 KO); 19 ND	United States
2005	Eugène Criqui	98–16–11 (56 KO)	France
2005	Joe Lynch	52–12–10 (38 KO); 83 ND	United States
2005	Charles "Bud" Taylor	71–23–6 (37 KO); 63 ND	United States
2005	Marcel Thil	112–22–14 (54 KO); *Typo on website showing 148KO	France
2006	Lou Brouillard	107–29–2 (66 KO); 2 ND	Canada
2006	Jimmy Slattery	113–12 (50 KO); 4 ND	United States
2006	Teddy Yarosz	107–18–3 (17 KO)	United States
2007	George Godfrey	97–20–3 (80 KO)	United States
2007	Pedro Montañez	92–7–4 (54 KO)	Puerto Rico
2007	Kid Norfolk	80–16–2 (31 KO)	United States
2008	Len Harvey	111–13–9 (51 KO)	England
2008	Frank Klaus	51–4–2 (27 KO); 33 ND	United States
2008	Harry Lewis	80–16–11 (42 KO); 56 ND	United States
2009	William Jones	101–24–13 (52 KO)	United States
2009	Billy Smith	30–24–26 (22 KO); 9 ND	Canada
2009	Billy Soose	34–6–1 (13 KO)	United States
2010	Young Corbett II	68–22–16 (47 KO); 6 NC	United States
2010	Rocky Kansas	64–12–7 (32 KO); 81 ND	Italy; United States
2010	Billy Miske	48–2–2 (35 KO); 54 ND	United States
2011	Memphis Pal Moore	107–28–27 (11 KO); 101 ND; 1 NC; Per boxrec. Not listed	United States
2011	Jack Root	40–3–3 (28 KO); 2 NC	United States
2011	Dave Shade	124–23–46 (14 KO); 26 ND; 1 NC	United States
2012	Newsboy Brown	57–13–5 (11 KO); 14 ND	United States
2012	Leo Hauck	158–9–11 (21 KO); 34 ND	United States
2012	Jake Kilrain	18–6–12 (3 KO); 1 ND	United States
2013	Wesley Ramey	158–26–11 (9 KO)	United States
2013	Jeff Smith	149–31–5 (52 KO)	United States
2014	George Chaney	101–21–3 (78 KO); 53 ND; Per boxrec. Not listed	United States
2014	Mike O'Dowd	52–7–3 (40 KO); 54 ND; 1 NC; Per boxrec. Not listed	United States
2014	Charles Ledoux	98–29–6 (80 KO)	France
2015	Yoko Gushiken	23–1 (15 KO)	Japan
2015	Masao Ohba	38–2–1 (16 KO)	Japan
2015	Ken Overlin	135–19–9 (23 KO); 2 NC	United States
2016	Petey Sarron	102–23–12 (25 KO); 10 ND	United States
2017	Eddie Booker	66–5–8 (32 KO)	United States
2018	Sid Terris	92–13–5 (12 KO)	United States
2019	Tony DeMarco	58–12–1 (33 KO)	United States
2020	Frank Erne	30–6–11 (15 KO); 1 NC	Switzerland
2021	Davey Moore	59–7–1 (30 KO)	United States
2022	Tod Morgan	143–44–33 (30 KO)	United States
2023	Tiger Jack Fox	160–23–10 (109 KO); 2 NC	United States
2023	Pone Kingpetch	28–7 (9 KO)	Thailand
2024	Luis Angel Firpo	31–4 (26 KO)	Argentina
2025	Rodrigo Valdez	63–8–2 (43 KO)	Colombia
2026	Jimmy Clabby	86–21–23 (46 KO)	United States

=== Pioneers ===
Year	Inductees	Nationality
1990	Jack Broughton	England
1990	Jem Mace	England
1990	Daniel Mendoza	England
1990	Tom Sayers	England
1990	John L. Sullivan	United States
1991	Tom Cribb	England
1991	William "Bendigo" Thompson	England
1992	James Belcher	England
1992	James Figg	England
1992	James Burke	England
1992	John Jackson	England
1992	Thomas King	England
1992	Nat Langham	England
1992	Tom Spring	England
1993	Hen Pearce	England
1994	Benjamin Brain	England
1995	Tom Johnson	England
1995	Jem Ward	England
1996	John Morrissey	Ireland; United States
1997	Tom Molineaux	United States
1997	Dutch Sam	England
1998	Professor Mike Donovan	United States
2000	Arthur Chambers	England
2001	Barney Aaron	England
2002	John C. Heenan	United States
2002	Young Dutch Sam	England
2003	Caleb Baldwin	England
2003	Joe Goss	England
2004	Billy Edwards	England
2005	Jack Randall	England
2005	Bill Richmond	United States
2006	Jem Carney	England
2007	Young Barney Aaron	England
2007	Dick Curtis	England
2008	Dan Donnelly	Ireland
2008	Paddy Duffy	United States
2009	Tom Hyer	United States
2010	Paddington Tom Jones	England
2011	John Gully	England
2012	James Wharton	Morocco; England
2013	Joe Coburn	Ireland; United States
2014	Tom Allen	England
2020	Paddy Ryan	Ireland; United States
2025	Owen Swift	England

=== Non-participants ===
- Kenny Adams (2024)
- Johnny Addie (2018)
- Russ Anber (2026)
- Thomas S. Andrews (1992)
- Ray Arcel (1991)
- Bob Arum (1999)
- Jarvis Astaire (2006)
- Giuseppe Ballarati (1999)
- Kenny Bayless (2025)
- George Benton (2001)
- Ignacio Beristáin (2011)
- Al Bernstein (2012)
- A.F. Bettinson (2011)
- Whitey Bimstein (2006)
- Jack Blackburn (1992)
- William A. Brady (1998)
- Umberto Branchini (2004)
- Teddy Brenner (1993)
- Freddie Brown (2021)
- Amilcar Brusa (2007)
- Michael Buffer (2012)
- Frank Cappuccino (2026)
- Bill Cayton (2005)
- John Graham Chambers (1990)
- Don Chargin (2001)
- Stanley Christodoulou (2004)
- Gil Clancy (1993)
- Irving Cohen (2002)
- James W. Coffroth (1991)
- Cuco Conde (2007)
- Joe Cortez (2011)
- Cus D'Amato (1995)
- Lou DiBella (2020)
- Jeff Dickson (2000)
- Arthur Donovan (1993)
- Mickey Duff (1999)
- Angelo Dundee (1994)
- Chris Dundee (1994)
- Don Dunphy (1993)
- Dan Duva (2003)
- Lou Duva (1998)
- Pierce Egan (1991)
- Don Elbaum (2019)
- Whitey Esneault (2016)
- Shelly Finkel (2010)
- Nat Fleischer (1990)
- Richard Kyle Fox (1997)
- Dewey Fragetta (2003)
- Don Fraser (2005)
- Eddie Futch (1994)
- Al Gavin (2025)
- Harry Gibbs (2025)
- Billy Gibson (2009)
- Jimmy Glenn (2026)
- Charley Goldman (1992)
- Ruby Goldstein (1994)
- Bob Goodman (2009)
- Brad Goodman (2023)
- Murray Goodman (1999)
- Dan Goossen (2020)
- Joe Goossen (2023)
- Bill Gore (2008)
- Howard Grant (2019)
- Abe J. Greene (2009)
- Larry Hazzard (2010)
- Barry Hearn (2014)
- Edwin “Flip” Homansky (2026)
- Akihiko Honda (2009)
- Joe Humphreys (1997)
- Sam Ichinose (2001)
- Brad Jacobs (2023)
- Jimmy Jacobs (1993)
- Mike Jacobs (1990)
- Jimmy Johnston (1999)
- Guy Jutras (2019)
- Jackie Kallen (2024)
- J. P. Leo "Jack 'Doc' Kearns" McKernan (1990)
- Don King (1997)
- Klaus-Peter Kohl (2018)
- Mills Lane (2013)
- Tito Lectoure (1997)
- Harold Lederman (2015)
- Jimmy Lennon Jr. (2013)
- A.J. Liebling (1992)
- Hugh, Earl of Lonsdale (1996)
- Harry Markson (1992)
- John, Marquess of Queensberry (1990)
- Jackie McCoy (2021)
- Arthur Mercante Sr. (1995)
- Dan Morgan (2000)
- William Muldoon (1996)
- Gilbert Odd (1995)
- Tom O'Rourke (1999)
- Mogens Palle (2008)
- Dan Parker (1996)
- George Parnassus (1991)
- J Russell Peltz (2004)
- Tex Rickard (1990)
- Freddie Roach (2012)
- Irving Rudd (1999)
- Rodolfo Sabbatini (2006)
- Lee Samuels (2019)
- Lope Sarreal (2005)
- Wilfried Sauerland (2010)
- George Siler (1995)
- Sam Silverman (2002)
- Steve Smoger (2015)
- Jack Solomons (1995)
- Sylvester Stallone (2010)
- Richard Steele (2014)
- Fred Sternburg (2024)
- Emanuel Steward (1997)
- José Sulaimán (2007)
- Sam Taub (1995)
- Herman Taylor (1998)
- Bruce Trampler (2010)
- Rip Valenti (2012)
- Lou Viscusi (2004)
- Jimmy Walker (1992)
- Frank Warren (2008)
- Al Weill (2003)

=== Observers ===
- Seth Abraham (2023)
- Steve Albert (2018)
- Dave Anderson (2008)
- Teddy Atlas (2019)
- Lester Bromberg (2001)
- Jimmy Cannon (2002)
- Harry Carpenter (2011)
- Nick Charles (2024)
- Ralph Citro (2001)
- Howard Cosell (2010)
- Tad Dorgan (2007)
- Steve Farhood (2017)
- Bernard Fernandez (2020)
- Jack Fiske (2003)
- Paul Gallico (2009)
- Bill Gallo (2001)
- Randy Gordon (2025)
- Jim Gray (2018)
- Ross Greenburg (2025)
- Reg Gutteridge (2002)
- Thomas Hauser (2020)
- W.C. Heinz (2004)
- Kevin Iole (2026)
- Jersey Jones (2005)
- Hank Kaplan (2006)
- Michael Katz (2012)
- George Kimball (2021)
- Joe Koizumi (2008)
- Jim Lampley (2015)
- Jay Larkin (2021)
- Wallace Matthews (2024)
- Mario Rivera Martino (2019)
- Hugh McIlvanney (2009)
- Larry Merchant (2009)
- Harry Mullan (2005)
- Barney Nagler (2004)
- LeRoy Neiman (2007)
- Damon Runyon (2002)
- Tim Ryan (2023)
- Budd Schulberg (2003)
- Ed Schuyler Jr. (2010)
- Herbert "Bert" Sugar (2005)
- Alex Wallau (2026)
- Stanley Weston (2006)

=== Women's Modern ===
Year	Inductees	Record	Nationality
2020	Christy Martin	49–7–3 (32 KO)	United States
2020	Lucia Rijker	17–0 (14 KO)	Netherlands
2021	Laila Ali	24–0 (21 KO)	United States
2021	Ann Wolfe	24–1 (16 KO) 1 NC	United States
2022	Regina Halmich	54–1–1 (16 KO)	Germany
2022	Holly Holm	33–2–3 (9 KO)	United States
2023	Alicia Ashley	24–12–1 (4 KO)	Jamaica
2023	Laura Serrano	17–5–3 (6–KO)	Mexico
2024	Jane Couch	28–11 (9 KO)	England
2024	Ana María Torres	28–3–3 (16–KO)	Mexico
2025	Mary Jo Sanders	25–1–1 (8–KO)	United States
2025	Anne Sophie Mathis	27–4–1–1 (23–KO)	France
2025	Yessica Chávez	32–5–3 (4–KO)	Mexico
2026	Naoko Fujioka	19–3–1 (7–KO)	Japan
2026	Jackie Nava	40–4–4 (16–KO)	Mexico

=== Women's Trailblazer ===
Year	Inductees	Record	Nationality
2020	Barbara Buttrick	30–1–1 (0 KO)	England
2021	Jackie Tonawanda	35–1 (34 KO)	United States
2021	Marian Trimiar	18–4 (5 KO) 2 NC	United States
2023	JoAnn Hagen	1–1 (0 KO)	United States
2024	Theresa Kibby	10–3–4 (3 KO)	United States
2025	Cathy Davis	13–0–0–1 (13 KO)	United States

=== Women non-participants ===
- Aileen Eaton (2002) - first woman inducted into the IBHOF
- Lorraine Chargin (2018)
- Kathy Duva (2020)
- Dr. Margaret Goodman (2021)

== See also ==
- Bare Knuckle Boxing Hall of Fame
- Women's International Boxing Hall of Fame
