= Richard Curtis (disambiguation) =

Richard or Dick Curtis may refer to:

- Richard Curtis (born 1956), British screenwriter
- Richard Curtis (politician) (born 1959), American politician
- Richard Curteys (c. 1532–1582), English bishop (archaic spelling of Curtis)
- Dick Curtis (1902–1952), American actor
- Dick Curtis (boxer) (1802–1843), English boxing pioneer
- Rick Curtis, musician and co-writer of Southern Cross (Crosby, Stills and Nash song)

== See also ==
- Curtis (surname)
