= Randy Gordon (boxing) =

American sports journalist (born 1949)

Randy Gordon (born March 11, 1949) is an American boxing journalist, commentator, and administrator.

== Sportswriting ==
Gordon earned a bachelor's degree in journalism from Long Island University and began his broadcasting career as an overnight and weekend DJ and assistant sports director at rock-and-roll station WGBB. He compiled a 37–2 record as an amateur boxer and was knocked out in the second round of his only professional fight.

== Sportswriting ==
Gordon began covering boxing in 1974 for Stanley Weston's World & International Boxing Magazines. In 1979 he was recruited to The Ring by Bert Sugar. He succeeded Bert Sugar as editor in 1983. One year later, Gordon was let go in a cost-cutting measure. The New York Times reported that the magazine was close to $1.3 million in debt and many of the publication's highest-salaried employees were let go. He was succeeded by Nigel Collins.

== Television commentator ==
Gordon began his commentary career on ESPN's coverage of Top Rank Boxing in December 1980. He was removed from the network in October 1982 after criticizing Top Rank's use of a medically-suspended fighter during a broadcast. From 1984 to 1988 he was the analyst for USA Wednesday/Thursday Night Fights. In January 1983, he became the Boxing Analyst for the USA Network. In 1986 he succeeded John Condon on the MSG Network, providing color commentary for Felt Forum bouts alongside blow-by-blow announcers Sam Rosen and Bruce Beck. Sam Rosen.

== New York State Athletic Commission ==
In 1987, José Torres resigned as chairman of the New York State Athletic Commission to write a Mike Tyson biography. Sugar Ray Leonard, Gil Clancy, Alex Wallau, and Joyce Carol Oates were considered for the job, but were not interested. Gordon was selected out of the remaining candidates, which included Michael Katz, Harold Lederman, and Arthur Mercante Sr. His nomination was confirmed by the New York Senate on March 14, 1989.

After taking office, Gordon saw that fighters underwent intense background checks and mandatory drug tests. He also sought proof of contracts and payouts between fighters and managers. He refused to sanction bouts he saw as mismatches. For this reason he vetoed two of George Foreman's proposed opponents and canceled at least a dozen matches promoted by Bob Goodman.

In 1989, Gordon chaired the commission's hearings over Bill Cayton's complaint that Don King was interfering in his boxer-manager agreement with Mike Tyson. The hearings ended inconclusively after Gordon made a comment regarding Tyson's deceased former manager Jimmy Jacobs shopping the fighter around. King's attorney requested that Gordon recuse himself as the statement made him a witness to Jacobs and Cayton's intentions and could prejudice his decision making towards King.

Gordon held up the judge's decision in the December 1, 1989 fight between Dennis Milton and Michael Olajide pending a review by the athletic commission. The match ended when Ken Zimmer stopped the fight and appeared to declare Olajide the winner by a technical knockout. However, Zimmer said that he thought he had heard the bell signaling the fight's end and Milton was declared the winner by decision. After reviewing video tape of the fight, the commission ruled that Milton won the bout.

Following Jesse Ferguson's February 6, 1993 victory over Ray Mercer, Gordon brought allegations that the fight was fixed to the New York State Police. Mercer was indicted for trying to bribe his opponent, but found not guilty.

After the Buddy McGirt vs. Pernell Whitaker fight, Gordon and the commission were criticized for allowing McGirt, who had a torn rotator cuff, to compete. Gordon stated that he and commission doctor Barry Jordan had examined McGirt and were both convinced that he was in shape to fight. Afterwards, NcGirt admitted he had hid the shoulder injury from the Commissioner and the medical staff.

On March 8, 1993, Commissioner Gordon--always an advocate of females being involved in the sport--assigned three female judges to score the Aaron Davis-Nick Rupa Super Middleweight main event at Madison Square Garden. It was the first time three female judges had been assigned to the same fight. They were Carol Castellano, Melvina Lathan and Barbara Perez. Both Lathan and Perez scored it 98-92 for Davis; Castellano had the same winner by a 97-93 score.

In 1995, Commissioner Gordon approved females to box in New York State for the first time. Shortly after, Kathy Collins won a four-round decision against Lori Bishoff in Westbury, New York.

Shortly after, Gordon was fired by Cuomo's successor in a customary political move. Gordon was replaced by former heavyweight champion Floyd Patterson.

== Later work ==
From 1995 to 1997, Gordon was the Director of Boxing at Foxwoods Resort Casino. In 2007 he joined Sirius Satellite Radio as the host of a boxing and Mixed Martial Arts show. He and Gerry Cooney currently host At the Fights on SiriusXM. In June 2023, Gordon re-joined the staff of Ring Magazine as a columnist with "Commissioner's Corner." Gordon has written two books on boxing; "Ali" for young readers (Penguin Publishing, 2001) and "Glove Affair" (Rowman & Littlefield, 2019).

== Awards ==
In 2004, Gordon was inducted into the New Jersey Boxing Hall of Fame.

In 2016, he was inducted into the Ring 8 New York State Hall of Fame.

In 2024, he was inducted into the Atlantic City Hall of Fame.

In 2025, Gordon was inducted into the International Boxing Hall of Fame.

In June 2026, Gordon was inducted into the Florida Boxing Hall of Fame's Class of 2026.
