= Barbara Buttrick =

British boxer (born 1929)

Personal information
- Nickname: "Battling Barbara"
- Nationality: British
- Born: Barbara Buttrick; 3 December 1929 (age 96) Cottingham, East Riding of Yorkshire, England
- Height: 4 ft 11 in (150 cm)

Boxing career
- Stance: Orthodox

Boxing record
- Total fights: 32
- Wins: 30
- Losses: 1
- Draws: 1

Barbara Buttrick (born 3 December 1929), nicknamed "Battling Barbara", is a retired British boxer and a world champion in women's boxing in the 1940s and 1950s.

Originally from England, Buttrick is considered a pioneer of women's professional boxing.

== Professional career ==
Buttrick was born in Cottingham, East Riding of Yorkshire, England on 3 December 1929. She became a shorthand typist in an office in the West End of London.

Known as "The Mighty Atom of the Ring", Buttrick, at 4′ 11″, fought from 98 lbs. to being the World's unbeaten flyweight (112) and bantamweight (118) champion from 1950 to 1960.

Buttrick started her boxing career in 1948, touring Europe with carnivals as a bantamweight in the boxing booth. She went to the United States in the mid-1950s, joined the carnival circuit, but left because the American carnivals were rougher than the European ones. She then fought professionally in Canada, Chicago, and southern Florida. One of the Canadian matches became the first women's bout to be broadcast on radio.

In 1954 she was part of the first boxing match between two women on American national television.

In 1957, she moved to Dallas. She and opponent Phyllis Kugler won the state's first boxing licenses for women, and a world title bout was held in San Antonio. Buttrick won a unanimous decision, making her the first women's world boxing champion. By then, she had fought more than 1,000 exhibitions with men and 18 professional women's fights, only one of which she lost—outweighed by 33 pounds and stricken with the flu.

Buttrick allegedly fought many exhibition bouts against male opposition.

Buttrick reportedly had one career loss, to JoAnn Hagen, in 31 pro bouts before retiring in 1960 at 30–1–1.

After an absence of 15 years, she briefly returned to the ring in 1977.

== Career after boxing ==
In the mid-1990s, she founded and became the president of the Women's International Boxing Federation (WIBF) which is a major sanctioning body of women's boxing.

Buttrick's last known residence was Miami Beach, Florida, United States.

== Honours and legacy ==
In 2014, Buttrick was inducted into the International Women's Boxing Hall of Fame in Fort Lauderdale, Florida.

In 2016, it was announced that a stage play based on Buttrick's life, Mighty Atoms by Amanda Whittington, would be premiered in Hull as part of the city's UK City of Culture celebrations in 2017.

In 2019, Buttrick became one of the first three women boxers (and the first English woman boxer) elected to the International Boxing Hall of Fame; 2019 was the first year that women were on the ballot.
