= Young Dutch Sam =

English boxer (1808–1843)

- Evans around 20 years of age

Personal information
- Nickname: "The Phenomenon"
- Nationality: British
- Born: Samuel Evans; 30 January 1808 Well Street, Ratcliffe Highway, East End, London, England
- Died: 4 November 1843 (aged 35) West End London, England, Kensal Green Cemetery
- Height: 5 ft 9 in (1.75 m)
- Weight: At the time he was considered a lightweight: averaged 137-45 lb (62.1-65.7K) in early career Fought around 152 lb (68.9K) at end of career. In modern parlance he would be a welterweight.

Boxing career
- Stance: Orthodox; right-handed

Boxing record
- Wins: 16 (Estimate)
- Losses: 0

Young Dutch Sam (30 January 1808 – 4 November 1843) was an English professional bare-knuckle boxer. He was considered a lightweight during his career, but his fighting weight would be comparable to a welterweight in modern parlance. He was inducted into the International Boxing Hall of Fame in 2002.

== Early life ==
Young Dutch Sam was born Samuel Evans on 30 January 1808 on Well Street, Ratcliffe Highway in London's East End, a handsome son of the Jewish bare-knuckle boxer Samuel Elias known as Dutch Sam. His father was of fairly recent Dutch heritage. According to a few accounts, particularly the 1904 volume, Famous Fights Past and Present, he may well have been an illegitimate child, born out of wed-lock, though his mother, not his father's parentage was in question. Ratcliffe Highway was a poor section of London, known for vice and crime. In his earliest days, Young Dutch Sam worked as a shop boy in a potato warehouse, and later as a press boy and sheet folder for the printing presses of Pierce Egan. He was also a marker at the King's Bench Racket-ground, where he learned to play the game with science and skill, rivalling the greatest players of his era. Most important in his youth, was Sam's work for Egan, the early boxing journalist and publisher. Evans also worked as a "runner" distributing Egan's weekly newspaper Pierce Egan's Life in London, to sports fans in pubs.

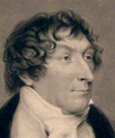
Heavyweight champ John Jackson

Through Egan, Sam met English bare-knuckle champion John Jackson, known as Gentleman Jackson, who years before had beaten the Jewish former English champion Daniel Mendoza, at whose academy Young Dutch may have also studied. Not long after meeting Jackson, Sam left the newspaper business to make a living in the prize ring. His boxing skills were honed under the tutelage of Richard Curtis, an exceptional hard hitting bare-knuckle boxer of the period, who often acted as his advisor and boxing second in important matches.

Sam's first benefit fight, considered a sparring exhibition, was at the Old Fives Court on Saint Martin's Lane, where his considerable skill was noted.

== Career ==
Sam won his first fight at age 15 against Bill Dean, and went on to defeat Ned Stockham, Harry Jones, Tom Cooper, Jack Cooper, Dick Davis and Ned Neale among others before retiring undefeated. He was considered the premier lightweight boxer during his career, although specific weight-based titles did not exist at this time. Young Dutch Sam displayed a mixture of power and speed in the ring, yet he had the ability to inflict serious punishment, notably the strong left jab he used to soundly defeat Gypsy Cooper in 1826.

Around this time, Hughes Ball a wealthy, and socially distinguished boxing devotee of the era, became Sam's patron. By 1829, Ball was forced to flea from England to France, as a result of excessive gambling debts, though he returned to England by 1834.

Sam was married in 1823, according to London's Morning News, and obtained some property with the marriage. By 1826, he was working as a Publican or bar keeper on Blackmon Street.

=== Victories over Harry Jones, and Tom "Gypsey" Cooper ===
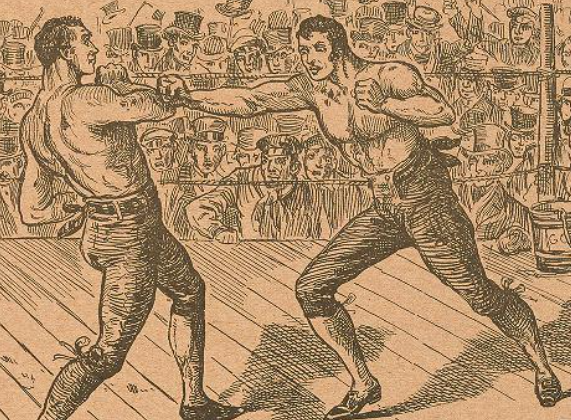
Sam (left) blocks a blow from Jones

Young Dutch Sam fought Harry Jones (The 'Sailor Boy') on Tuesday 18 October 1825. The fight took place at Shere Mere on the borders of Bedfordshire. Jones appeared more muscular and likely stronger, though Sam was noticeably the taller of the two competitors. The match was fought in the rain, and the well known bare-knuckle boxer Dick Curtis was Young Dutch Sam's second. In the tenth round Jones caught Sam around the neck and threw him to the ground. This tactic, known as fibbing, would be illegal using today's Marquess of Queensberry rules. The last blow in the 18th round was a right to the jaw, which ended the match in 53 minutes, as Jones did not wish to continue when his seconds attempted to lift him. The reporter for London's Morning Chronicle wrote that Jones showed less aggression in the final rounds, where Young Dutch Sam took the lead in the fighting. Tellingly, Jones was frequently down which ended rounds thirteen through fifteen. The purse was set for £25 a side, a considerable sum for an early career match.

Jack Cooper who attended brother Tom

In a bout with Tom "Gypsey" Cooper in Gravesend in Essex close to the Thames on 25 April 1826, Sam was a clear winner. The number of rounds in this fight seems to be recorded differently in different sources. Pugilistica gives the full fight report and indicates that Young Dutch Sam won in 9 rounds (although other sources say 5, 15 or 18 rounds). Sam was the favorite in the betting at 2–1, for a purse of £30 a side. Gypsey Cooper was the brother of Jack Cooper who attended him at the match. Sam took a clear lead, landing a right and left to Gypsey's mouth in the first that floored him, and floored Cooper again with a right and left at the end of the third. In the sixth, Sam showed his ability to rush away from the blows of his opponents, as he had in earlier rounds. Late in the fight Sam dominated, badly punishing his opponent. Sam's habit of drawing his man to him, and then taking advantage of the closeness to punch with accuracy echoed the scientific boxing style of his primary mentor Dick Curtis. Gypsey Cooper, though a stouter and somewhat more muscular opponent, left his head unguarded during his mad rushes which gave Young Dutch Sam the opportunity to frequently connect with blows to this vital spot.

On 8 June 1826, Young Dutch Sam met Bill Carroll, a brickmaker, in Ascot, in a match at the well known racetrack that lasted sixteen rounds and took thirty minutes. Sam took the lead and with superior science was declared the victor. As the track that was frequently attended by high placed nobles and had recently hosted the King, a collection of £50 for the fight's purse was quickly completed at the Royal Stand, where the nobles were seated.

"Gypsey" Jack Cooper

Young Dutch Sam defeated "Gypsey" Jack Cooper on 27 April 1827 in Andover, in nine rounds. Jack Cooper, like his brother Tom was of Gypsey stock, and described as dark, muscular and stocky. Dick Curtis (boxer), there to support Sam, his friend and mentor, insisted on seconding the match despite having just completed a difficult bout with Barney Aaron. According to Puglistica, Cooper had previously been sentenced to six months in jail for the death of Dan O'Leary, a recent opponent who had died from the ring injuries he inflicted. It took Sam only 33 minutes to close Cooper's eyes and lacerate his face from repeated blows. The purse for this fight was £50.

=== Victories over Dick Davis, Jack Martin, Ned Neale, and Tom Gaynor ===
In one of his best-remembered bouts, Sam beat Dick Davis in 30 rounds at Haversham on 19 June 1827. The fight lasted for an epic 3 hours and 35 minutes. The purse of £50 a side was considerable for the time. Davis was not a widely known boxer and lost decisively to Young Dutch Sam, who by the end of the bout had done considerable damage to Davis's eyes and face, peppering him with blows. Sam fought cautiously, nearly always inflicting damage, but taking his time and retreating effectively when necessary. Though Davis was determined to continue the bout, in the late rounds his handler could not induce him to get close to Young Dutch Sam, and he received the worst of the exchanges without getting inside his opponent.

On 4 November 1828, Young Dutch Sam defeated Jack Martin in seven rounds taking sixteen minutes on Knowle Hill, near Maidenhead, for the impressive purse of £100 a side. Young Dutch Sam had taken a commanding lead in the fighting by the second through sixth rounds, and when the seventh came, the fight ended. In the sixth, Sam floored Martin with a right to the cheek, one of the strongest blows in the match, and the first clear knockdown caused by a blow in the match. The London Morning News wrote that Sam was not as fit and fast as in his earliest days, although he was still the much younger man as Martin was 32 years of age compares to Sam's 21. Apparently even three years of bare-knuckle fighting had begun to take its toll on Young Dutch Sam. The early betting favored Martin at 6–4.

Young Dutch Sam and Ned Neale

Young Dutch Sam defeated Ned Neale on 7 April 1829 in 78 rounds, lasting around 1 hour 41 minutes, The fight took place in Ludlow, over 150 miles from London, so the attendance was not great. Young Dutch fought at around 154 pounds or 11 stone, near the limit of the modern welterweight range which ends at 160. The boxers met for a considerable purse of £100 which was collected by subscription from the townspeople. Neale had lost only once prior to this bout. At the end of the match, it was noted that Sam appeared to be a more scientific boxer, with greater speed and skill. From the 66th to the final round, it was clear that Sam had a defining lead, and it was noted that Neale landed on the ground to end the round quickly in many rounds, a factor that shortened the length of rounds and the duration of the match. By the fight's end, Neale was functionally blinded by the swelling of his eyes and required the intervention of a doctor, and though Sam was able to walk to his coach with difficulty, the damage to the left side of his face and head was considerable. Many believed that Ned's loss of weight to make the pre-fight weigh-in cost him in physical endurance and was a factor in his poor performance in the late rounds.

Young Dutch Sam and Tom Gaynor; Sam lands a left

On 24 June 1834, Sam defeated Tom Gaynor in 17 rounds, 2 hours and 5 minutes. The fight took place at Hurstbourne Common near Andover before an impressive audience of nearly 10,000. Young Dutch administered his strongest blows with his left hand, as according to London's Morning Chronicle, he had injured his right hand in the second round. Among the large crowd who attended the fight were noblemen, Military men, and Magistrates. This fight occurred directly before the notorious bout in which Owen Swift defeated Anthony Noon, a fight which resulted in Noon's death and was a factor in the later adoption of the London Prize Ring Rules.

The leading prizefight reporter of the period, Pierce Egan, used these words to describe Young Dutch Sam's emergence into the ring:

[April 1829] The anxious moment had now arrived, and all the peepers were on the stretch to view the condition of the men. On peeling, Sam appeared as fine as a star […] laughing and full of confidence. In short, SAM might be compared to a handsome game cock, crowing almost to himself, that victory was in his grasp. (Egan,Book of Sports, 1832)

While seconding for boxer Owen Swift in a particularly brutal three hour fight against William Phelps known as "Brighton Bill" on 13 March 1838, Bill died in the ring, and Swift, Sam, and all the other participants were arrested and tried, some for manslaughter. Around 18 March 1838, after the death of Bill, in the court of Hartfordshire, Swift was sentenced by jury to manslaughter in the first degree, and Sam to second-degree manslaughter, and though Swift spent some time in prison, both were eventually released.

=== Tragic life after boxing ===
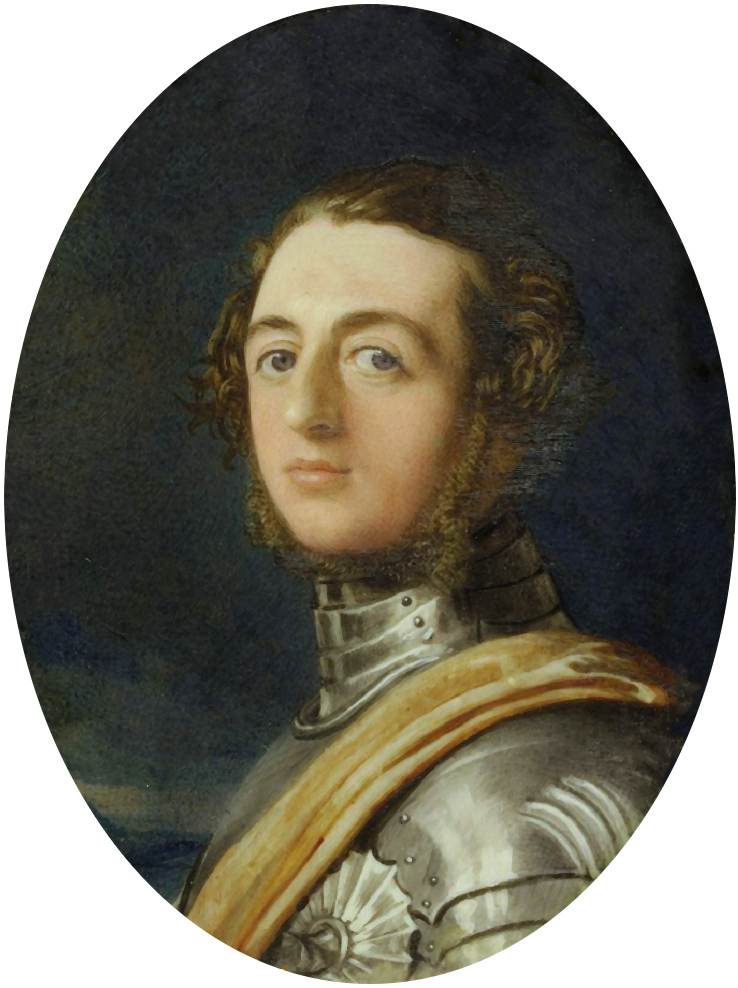
3rd Marquess of Waterford

On 4 April 1839, Young Dutch Sam was found guilty of assaulting a policeman, throwing him to the ground and landing upon him, at the Standard House in Piccadilly in London's Haymarket, breaking a bone in the policeman's shoulder according to one account. Sam was sentenced to three months in prison. At the time of the assault, he was in the company of Henry Beresford, 3rd Marquess of Waterford, also known as Lord Waldegrave and occasionally titled "The Mad Marquis", and the two were under the influence of alcohol. Lord Waldegrave, though not arrested at the time, was fined 5 pounds, and detained for attempting to obstinately rescue Sam from the policeman. The imprisonment led to a substantial decline in Sam's health.

In 1840, Young Dutch Sam's residence was used to finalize the financial arrangements as specified by contract for the English championship fight between Ben Caunt and Nick Ward.

Like several other boxers of his period, Sam opened and apparently owned a public house or pub when he retired, and had worked as a publican as early as 1826.

Young Dutch Sam died at the age of 35 in 1843 after retiring from boxing in 1834. His death occurred at his pub, the "Old Drury" on Brydges-street, in the upper class area of Covent Garden, central London. The bar at which he died still stands today as the Nell of Old Drury, and is situated directly opposite the Theatre Royal Drury Lane on Catherine Street. Several reliable accounts state that Sam left a widow but no children. He was believed to have operated his pub at this location for four years, apparently opening it around five years after his last fight. According to a few accounts, including that of the Newcastle Weekly, the rapid decline of his health during the end of his boxing career and during his retirement was the result of excessive drinking with his high society aristocratic friends, many of whom followed his boxing, and patronized his boxing career. His premature death at 35 was believed by a few accounts to be the result of multiple organ failure and lung disease, referred to as a "protracted pulmonary illness" in London's The Era. His funeral was held on 12 November 1843 Like several other boxers of his era, he was buried in Kensal Green Cemetery in London's Borough of Brent.

== Honors ==
Young Dutch Sam was elected into the International Boxing Hall of Fame, "Pioneer" Category in 2002. He was elected into the International Jewish Sports Hall of Fame in 2018.

== Personal ==
His father, Dutch Sam, was also a bare-knuckle boxer, and is a fellow International Boxing Hall of Famer. They are one of only two father son duos to have this honor.

== Selected bouts ==
10 Wins
Result	Opponent	Date	Location	Duration	Notes
Win	Bill Dean	1823	England	45 min.	First match
Win	Ned Stockman	5 July 1825	Knowle Hill, Berks, England	17 rounds, 37 minutes	Very early match Arranged by Hugh Ball
Win	Harry Jones	18 Oct 1825	Shere Mere, England	18 rounds	Right to the jaw ended match
Win	Gypsey Cooper	25 Apr 1826	Grave Send, England	18 Rounds	Used a strong left, had far better science and speed
Win	Bill Carroll	8 June 1826	Ascot Racetrack, England	16 rounds, 30 mins	Many Nobles present at the track They collected a £50 purse
Win	Jack Cooper	27 April 1827	Andover, England	9 rounds, 33 mins	Cooper was recently out of jail
Win	Dick Davis	19 June 1827	Haversham, England	30 rounds, 3 hrs., 35 mins	Important bout
Win	Jack Martin	4 Nov 1828	Knowle Hill, England	7 rounds, 18 mins	Martin was around 10 years older at 32 to Sam's 21
Win	Ned Neale	7 April 1829	Ludlow, England	78 rounds, 1 hr. 41 mins	£100 purse
Win	Tom Gaynor	24 June 1834	Andover, England	17 rounds, 2 hrs. 5 mins	Fought mostly with left.
