= JoAnn Hagen =

American boxer (1930/31–2004)

Personal information
- Nickname: Bashing Blond from South Bend
- Nationality: American
- Born: Jo-Ann Verhaegen; 1930 or 1931 South Bend, Indiana, U.S.
- Died: February 5, 2004 (age 73) South Bend, Indiana, U.S.
- Height: 5 ft 7 in (170cm)
- Weight: Featherweight; Lightweight

Boxing career
- Stance: Orthodox

JoAnn Hagen (1930 or 1931 – February 5, 2004) was an American former professional female boxer who was a pioneer of women's boxing in the 1940s and 1950s.

== Early life ==
Jo-Ann Verhaegen was born in South Bend, Indiana, United States, in 1930 or 1931.

She attended Washington High School. She was "discovered" while playing sandlot football with boys.

== Professional boxing career ==
Verhaegen began to regularly train at local promoter Johnny Nate's boxing gym. Her first fight came after just two days of training, when she filled in for another trainee and won.

She continued her career on tour, as women's boxing was banned in Indiana and Illinois. She boxed in events held throughout the Midwest. Her career also included a two-year stint in wrestling.

Having claimed the women's world title at 126 lbs, Hagen met Pat Emerick in Council Bluffs, Iowa, in November 1949, where she was stopped in the fourth round.

In June 1950, she appeared on the first card to feature women's boxing in West Virginia, sparring Nancy Parker in a six-round exhibition.

Hagen fought Norm Jones, a male boxer, in Michigan City in 1952, winning by decision after four rounds.

In September 1954, in Calgary, Alberta, Hagen beat Barbara Buttrick by an eight-round decision, the only loss of Buttrick's career, before 1,200 fans. It was the first women's bout broadcast on radio.

In the 1950s, she built a sports center in South Bend at 513 N. Hill St. to train girl boxers and host bouts, completing at least sixty percent of the work herself.

The boxer from South Bend gained fame at home and abroad throughout the 1950s. She once posed with Sugar Ray Robinson for a publicity shoot. Hagen promoted women's boxing with her high-profile appearances on TV. On July 22, 1956, she was a guest on the game show What's My Line?. Sydney Pollack helped arrange it by submitting a letter and Hagen's photo to the show's producers. Her television appearance on The Steve Allen Show came in November 1956.

Over an eight-year career, she reigned as U.S. women's champion in the featherweight and lightweight divisions. She lost her national title to former stablemate Phyllis Kugler in December 1956. Controversy followed the split decision, as Hagen dominated the first three rounds and delivered the fight's only knockdown in round two.

After the Kugler bout, she retired from boxing. Following her retirement, Hagen enlisted in the Marine Corps.

== Death ==
Jo-Ann Verhaegen died on February 5, 2004, in South Bend, Indiana, United States, at age 73.

== Legacy ==
Hagen competed in three fights against men, winning every one.

She was posthumously inducted into the International Women's Boxing Hall of Fame in 2014. She was inducted into the "Women's Trailblazer Category" of the International Boxing Hall of Fame in 2023.
