= Phyllis Kugler =

American boxer (1936–2014)

Personal information
- Nationality: American
- Born: Phyllis Darlene Kugler; June 30, 1936 South Bend, Indiana, U.S.
- Died: March 6, 2014 (aged 77) Surprise, Arizona, U.S.
- Height: 5 ft 5 in (165 cm)
- Weight: Featherweight

Boxing career
- Stance: Orthodox

Boxing record
- Total fights: 57
- Wins: 55
- Losses: 1
- Draws: 1

Phyllis Kugler (June 30, 1936 – March 6, 2014) was an American professional female boxer who fought in the 1950s.

== Early life ==
Phyllis Kugler was born on June 30, 1936, in South Bend, Indiana, United States.

Her father boxed as an amateur, while her brothers took up boxing as well.

While working with JoAnn Hagen at a South Bend bowling alley in 1955, she pushed to join her at the gym and take up boxing. Though Hagen's manager advised against it, he changed his stance after seeing her eagerness and her ability to endure Hagen's punches.

== Professional boxing career ==
By the mid-1950s, Kugler was trained and managed in South Bend by local boxing trainer-manager Johnny Nate.

At 20, Kugler faced former stablemate and champion JoAnn Hagen in 1956. That November, they went on the Steve Allen Show, a nationally televised show, to promote their title fight, where Kugler and Hagen sparred briefly. She won the world lightweight championship with a controversial split decision against Hagen on December 13, 1956, in Roseland, Indiana. Her performance in beating Hagen brought her recognition as "Woman Boxer of the Year."

She balanced training with daytime work at a precision plastic factory in Mishawaka, Indiana, where she ran a press.

In her first title defense, she faced Barbara Buttrick in August 1957 at Pompano Beach, Florida's Municipal Baseball Stadium. The outdoor show, sanctioned by the Florida State Boxing Commission, ended in a draw.

Kugler and Buttrick were awarded the first women's boxing licenses in the state of Texas shortly after their bout. She faced Buttrick again on October 8, 1957, at the San Antonio Municipal Auditorium in the state's first sanctioned women's championship, losing the six-round title match by unanimous decision.

During the prime of her career, Kugler retired from the sport of boxing in 1959 at the age of 22. When she retired, she had a 55–1–1 record.

== Life after boxing ==
Following her boxing career, she married her first husband and started a family. She later earned a degree in psychology and worked at a psychiatric hospital. Kugler opened her own boutique in 1990.

== Death ==
Phyllis McCormick (née Kugler) died on March 6, 2014, in Surprise, Arizona, United States, at age 77.

== Legacy ==
Kugler secured titles in three separate women's weight classes. At the peak of her career, she made appearances on "The Steve Allen Show," "What's My Line?," and "I've Got a Secret."

Kugler was posthumously inducted into the International Women's Boxing Hall of Fame in 2015.
