= Umberto Branchini =

Umberto Branchini (1914–1997) was an Italian boxing promoter and manager.

Born in Modena, Italy, on 17 July 1914, he promoted or arranged fights on six continents during his career, which lasted for over fifty years. He was elected into the International Boxing Hall of Fame as a "Non-participant" and was also inducted into the World Boxing Hall of Fame in its "Expanded Category".

Branchini handled 10 world champions and 43 European Champions. Amongst the fighters he handled were: Rocky Mattioli, Miguel Angel Cuello, Chartchai Chionoi, Pedro Carrasco, Francesco Damiani, Maurizio Stecca, Francesco De Piccoli, and Salvatore Burruni.

Branchini died on 19 March 1997.
