= Bob Goodman =

American boxing promoter (1939–2023)

- Born: Robert Goodman; June 8, 1939; New York City, U.S.
- Died: March 5, 2023 (aged 83); Galloway, New Jersey, U.S.
- Occupations: Boxing promoter, publicist, matchmaker

Robert Goodman (June 8, 1939 – March 5, 2023) was an American boxing matchmaker, publicist, and promoter. He is a member of the International Boxing Hall of Fame since 2009, the Florida Boxing Hall of Fame (2009) and the New Jersey Boxing Hall of Fame since 1990, and recipient of the prestigious Boxing Writers Association of America's James J. Walker Award for Long and Meritorious Service to Boxing in 1980. He was the son of Murray Goodman, also in the International Boxing Hall of Fame, New Jersey Boxing Hall of Fame and Walker Award recipient. Bob Goodman also served as vice president and Matchmaker for Madison Square Garden from 1985 to 1994. They are the only father-son to have received all of those honors.

Goodman also spent twenty-five years with Don King Productions serving in many capacities – Vice President, Boxing Operations, Matchmaker, and Director of Public Relations.

Goodman was also the President of his own company, Garden State Boxing, where they promoted many world champions.

== Early years ==
Goodman was born and raised in the Bronx, New York. He was always told that he was conceived at Grossinger's, a famed Catskill Mountain resort that was the training home of many great champions, including Barney Ross, Rocky Marciano, Ken Norton, Roberto Duran, and Larry Holmes. However it was in another Catskill resort – The Evans, where he got hooked on boxing for good, when he stayed with France's Marcel Cerdan in 1948. “It was amazing,” said Goodman. “We didn’t even speak the same language, but he spoke with his eyes and gestures. I used to get up to run with him. It was there and then that I became a “boxing junkie”.

When Bob was a young teen, the family moved to New Jersey where he competed in soccer and track and field in school. He took many sports related jobs during the summers, including Madison Square Garden and the National Sports Council. He also worked on the S. Rae Hickok “Professional Athlete of the Year” Award, created by his father in 1949, which remained one of the most prized awards until 1975.

== Education ==
Goodman attended the University of Miami in Florida for two years before enlisting in the United States Coast Guard. Goodman was the Officer in Charge of Coast Guard Recruiting for the State of Connecticut upon the end of his enlistment.

== Career ==
After leaving the Coast Guard in 1962, Goodman took a public relations job with the New York Titans of the old American Football League. Upon the sale of the Titans to become the Jets, Goodman and his father created the “sports division” of a Madison advertising agency, Arthur Falconer Associates and promoted most of the major fights of the era. They also helped create the All-American Collegiate Golf Foundation, and handled other accounts such as Bancroft Sporting Goods and Tretorn.

When the company moved to New Jersey, Goodman and his father opened up their own firm on Madison Avenue, Murray Goodman Associates. They handled events for Main Bout, Bob Arum's Top Rank and Don King Productions. Light heavyweight great Bob Foster and heavyweight champion Ken Norton, were personal clients.

Don King brought Bob on board full-time as his Director of Boxing in the early 70's, where he remained until the end of 1985. During those years they promoted the biggest events in boxing, including the “Rumble in the Jungle” between Muhammad Ali and George Foreman; the “Thrilla in Manila” between Ali and Joe Frazier; The “Sunshine Showdown” with George Foreman and Joe Frazier, and the two fights between Roberto Duran and Sugar Ray Leonard.

At Madison Square Garden, Goodman and his staff developed many world champions, including James “Buddy” McGirt, Aaron “Superman” Davis, Tracy Patterson; Poison Junior Jones, Kevin Kelley, Julio Cesar Green, Lonnie Bradley, and Hector Acero Sanchez, among others.

Corporate changes caused Goodman to take his boxers to New Jersey, where they opened up Garden State Boxing. Goodman rejoined Don King, and served as his Vice President Boxing Operations and Public Relations until 2009.

Goodman then joined Roy Jones Jr.’s Square Ring Promotions as the Chief Operating Officer, where he remained.

== Personal life and death ==
Bob Goodman and his wife of fifty-four years, Kathleen, had four daughters and nine grandchildren. They lived in southern New Jersey.

Goodman died in Galloway, New Jersey, on March 5, 2023, at the age of 83.
