= Dick Curtis (boxer) =

English boxer (1802–1843)

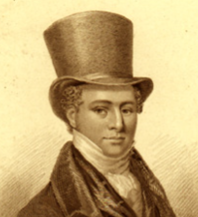
- Curtis at 20 in 1824

Personal information
- Nickname: "Pet of the Fancy"
- Nationality: British
- Born: Richard Curtis; 1 February 1802 Southwark, London, England
- Died: 16 September 1843 (aged 41) London, England
- Height: 5 ft 6 in (1.68 m)
- Weight: lightweight 126-133 lb, 57-60 kg

Boxing career
- Stance: Orthodox, right-handed

Boxing record
- Wins: 17 (approximate)
- Losses: 1

Dick Curtis (1 February 1802 – 16 September 1843), was an English bare-knuckle boxer who was considered the best and most powerful English lightweight of his era. He had only one loss in his career and was inducted into the International Boxing Hall of Fame in 2006.

== Pro career ==
Curtis was born on Suffolk Street, Southwark in Greater London on 1 February 1802. He had three brothers who boxed as well; Jack, George, and Bill. In the brutal calling of bare-knuckle boxing Dick's brother Jack was killed in the ring by the boxer Ned Turner while Dick was still in the midst of his career.

He turned professional in 1820, and began his career at the age of eighteen. His first match was with an opponent named Watson on 27 June 1820 in Moulsey Hurst, England, which he won. His second battle on 28 August 1820, was with Ned Brown at Wimbledon Common, and he won in fifteen rounds, earning a name for himself in the English ring.

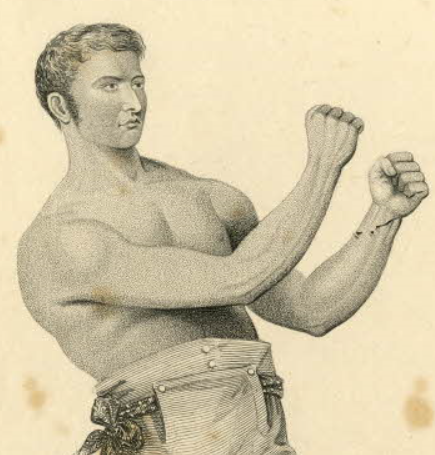
Curtis, drawn in 1824

On 24 October 1821, he defeated the well known English boxer Lenney in 29 rounds at Moulsey Hurst, and though mention of the fight was made in London's Observer on 28 November 1824, little if any mention of the match was made in area newspapers in 1821.

He defeated the younger boxer Cooper, the "Gypsey" on 25 May 1822 in seven rounds taking 22 minutes in Epson Downs, England, and though he fought carefully he had greater science throughout. This boxer was most likely one of the Gypsey brothers Tom or Jack Cooper, who both boxed, and not the Scottish boxer George Cooper who was active at the same time, but a larger boxer, and older. In the seventh, Cooper floored his opponent, but Curtis easily led the fighting and ended the match. Curtis won his first match with the larger and two inch taller Peter Warren the same year on 23 July, in ten rounds at Colnbrook, England. Curtis boxed at around 128 pounds, or 9 stones, 2. In the final round, Curtis unleashed a left to the nose and a right to the jaw, and finished with a right to the eye, that ended the match, leaving his opponent struggling to remain conscious.

=== Victories over Peter Warren, Dick Hares, and Ned Stockman ===
In two matches that were critical in establishing his reputation, Curtis defeated the well known boxer Peter Warren on 16 April 1823 in Moulsey Hurst, and on 8 July 1823 in Blindlow Heath in one round. In his April 16 bout, Warren was disqualified for striking Curtis on the head while sitting on his knee. The thirteen round bout was fierce, and though Warren was the larger boxer, Curtis showed superior science. In their bout on 8 July 1823, the odds on Curtis were six to four, and an impressive total of 600 pounds made up the purse. Warren's knee was injured in an early round, likely the second, and he verbally conceded the fight to Curtis. The match was the third the two had fought.

Curtis was scheduled to fight Dick Hares, sometimes spelled Ayers on 13 April 1824, but as was not uncommon during this period, the Constable and his deputy prevented the fight and sent home the backers and a crowd of hundreds where they had assembled at Shepperton Ridge in Surrey. Curtis later defeated Dick Hares in a three round match at Moulsey Hurst, England on 25 May 1824. The fight took twenty minutes according to London's Observer, but that estimate may be high.

In a lesser known, and less reliably reported match on 9 July 1825, Curtis again defeated Peter Warren with a terrific left in the seventh, that was followed by two blows that ended the match. The fight was held in Warwick, England.

Curtis bested the slightly heavier Ned Stockman at South Mims, 17 miles North of London, on 16 May 1826, when despite his having boldly and insolently challenged Curtis to accept the match, Stockman laid down and refused to continue fighting in the third round after being repeatedly peppered by his opponent.

==== Barney Aaron, 1827 ====
Ad for Curtis-Aaron match

In one of his best known victories on 27 February 1827, he defeated the well known Jewish boxer Barney Aaron, one of his most skilled opponents. Curtis vanquished Aaron in fifty minutes on a specially constructed stage in Andover, England, 70 miles East of London. Aaron was known as a "John Bull" or rushing boxer with good hitting strength but he was outweighed a full stone or 12 pounds by Curtis. Though Aaron stood to profit from the £100 purse, Curtis was a threatening opponent, and though slightly shorter, he was an accomplished boxer, two years younger, and had easily defeated the skilled and larger Peter Warren in a previous contest. London's Observer wrote of Curtis that "His power of hitting...for his size is considered greater than any man in the ring". As expected, Curtis was favored in the opening betting at 6-4. Aaron fared well in the first three rounds, but the momentum slowly turned and by the fifth he got far worse in a vicious exchange where his face was clearly injured. In the ninth round, only fifty minutes into the contest, Curtis floored Aaron with a blow that reflected "his whole force", on Barney's throat knocking him out and ending the match.

On 19 October 1827, he defeated Jack Teasdale in seventeen rounds at Egham, England. London papers carried more publicity about the planning for the fight than the results of the fight itself.

At the height of his popularity on 25 January 1828, Curtis performed an exhibition at Liverpool's Royal Amphitheatre with English champion Jem Ward, Jewish lightweight Young Dutch Sam, and Ned Stockman.

=== Final loss to Jack Perkins, 1828 ===
Perkins ends the match with a final right to Curtis's temple in round 11

Curtis' lone defeat came at the hands of Jack Perkins of Oxford on 30 December 1828, when he lost on a foul at the Parish Meadow at Henley Bottom in an eleven round match, around thirty-four miles from London. Curtis was attended by his friend Young Dutch Sam, a talented Jewish lightweight he had mentored in his early career. Both Curtis and Perkins were believed by their backers to have been undefeated in former contests, and a crowd close to 5,000 assembled to view the contest. A purse of £100 was provided for each participant. Perkins was as much as two inches taller and roughly fourteen pounds heavier, according to London's Observer, but he was not as well known or judged to be as skilled as his opponent. Another critical factor in the match was that Perkins was five years younger, and seemed to have greater stamina in the closing rounds. The first seven rounds seemed to clearly favor Curtis, but the tide turned in the eighth, and in the eleventh and last round he received a blow on the temple. Curtis had been sorely tested in the eighth through the eleventh rounds, and he could not return to scratch after the blow to his temple in the twelfth, and had his seconds end the bout in only 24 minutes. The bout was well publicized in London area newspapers, and one of the most significant of Curtis's career. Curtis's loss and the large purse he received led to a period of profligate or drunken days he shared with his aristocratic followers. Drunken idleness weakened his body, and ended his boxing career when he lost the confidence of his sponsors.

=== Death of William Phelps, 1838 ===
On 13 March 1838, Curtis was one of two seconds to William Phelps known as "Brighton Bill" in his fight with the well known boxer Owen Swift. Phelps died three days later as a result of the injuries he sustained from the fight with Swift which occurred at Melbourne Heath in Cambridgeshire. The battle was a brutal affair lasting 85 rounds and 95 minutes. The event had a large audience of 3000, as it was easily accessible by coach, and Swift was well known. Swift's prize fighting had led to the death of two former opponents, and William Phelps, himself, had previously killed a man in a prize fight. These factors later incited several magistrates to act and three months later, in June 1838, Curtis was sentenced to eight months imprisonment at Herford Assizes for acting as a principle to manslaughter in the second degree, even though he had only acted as second to the victim. Curtis was discharged from custody, however, on 11 July 1838, when a coroner determined that the cause of death could not be exclusively attributed to the fight. The death of William Phelps eventually led to the adoption of the London Prize Ring Rules which included certain safety measures, and excluded some of the harsher forms of fighting by making them fouls. London Prize Ring Rules replaced the less restrictive Broughton's rules of 1743, under which Curtis fought.

The carriage of Henry Beresford, 3rd Marquess of Waterford was seen at the match between Swift and Phelps, and the Marquess was known at times to both drink and gamble to excess, a habit which had had negative consequences for Young Dutch Sam, Owen Swift's second at the fight. It is not unlikely the Marquess and other nobleman were occasionally in the company of Curtis when he turned to drinking after his loss to Jack Perkins, and after his incarceration after the death of William Phelps. Such behavior contributed to Curtis's poor health and early death five years later.

== Death ==
Curtis sustained injuries while sparring on 16 September 1843. He died at his home on Little Surrey Street on Blackfriars Road within an hour of midnight. He had been taken with a painful illness for several months before his death, and died in poverty. The Derby Mercury wrote that he had long been ill from his "nightly excesses", a phrase usually used to imply drinking in the parlance of the era. The Leicester Chronicle a working class newspaper writing near the height of the working class movement in Leicester, went into slightly greater detail, attributing the cause of his death partly to "the irregular and dissipated life he had been leading for several years". Dissipated in this instance referred to a debauched or profligate lifestyle.

== Selected bouts ==
12 wins,1 loss, 1 Forfeit
Result	Opponent	Date	Location	Duration	Notes
Win	Watson	27 June 1820	Moulsey Hurst, Eng.	16 rounds, 25 mins	Little known match
Win	Ned Brown	28 Aug 1820	Wimbleton Common, Eng.	15 Rounds, 57 mins	
Win	Lenney	24 Oct 1821	Moulsey Hurst, Eng.	29 rounds, 39(?) mins	
Win	Gypsey Cooper	26 May 1822	Epsom Downs, Eng.	7 rounds, 22 mins	Cooper, the Gypsey, was Tom or Jack Cooper
Win	Peter Warren	16 Apr 1823	Moulsey Hurst, Eng.	13 Rounds, Foul	Warren hit Curtis while he was down
Win	Peter Warren	8 Jul 1823	Blindlow Heath, Eng.	1 Round	Warren conceded due to injury
Forfeit	Barney Aaron	23 Nov 1824	Warwick, Eng.	Forfeit	
Win	Peter Warren	19 May 1825	Empson, England	5 Rounds	Obscure match
Win	Peter Warren	9 July 1825	Warwick, England	7 Rounds, 13 minutes	Obscure match
Win	Ned Savage	5 August 1825	Castle Tavern, England	17 Rounds	Obscure match
Win	Ned Stockman	16 May 1826	South Mims, England	3 Rounds	Obscure match
Win	Barney Aaron	27 Feb 1827	Andover, Eng.	9 Rounds, 50 mins	Held on a newly constructed stage
Win	Jack Teasdale	19 Oct 1827	Egham, England	17 Rounds	
Win	George Philips	2 Jan 1828	Black Friars Road, England	5 rounds	
Loss	Jack Perkins	30 Dec 1828	Parish Meadow, Hulsey Bottom, England	11 rounds, 23 minutes	Curtis could not continue Led to boxing demise Fought for £100 a side

== Honors ==
In 2006, Curtis was elected into the International Boxing Hall of Fame, "Pioneer" Category.
