= Dutch Sam =

English boxer (1775–1816)

Sam Elias
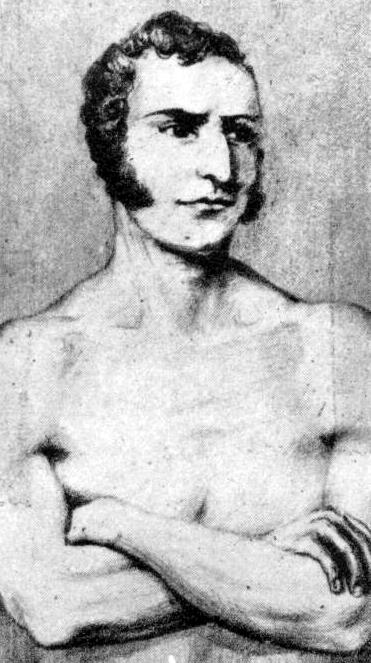
- Elias in his early fighting days

Personal information
- Nicknames: Dutch Sam The Terrible Jew The Man with the Iron Hand
- Nationality: British
- Born: Samuel Elias; 4 April 1775 Whitechapel, London
- Died: 3 July 1816 (aged 41) Whitechapel, London
- Height: 5 ft 6 in (1.68 m)
- Weight: Lightweight

Boxing career
- Stance: Orthodox;right-handed

Boxing record
- Total fights: Around 100
- Losses: Around 2

Samuel Elias, better known as Dutch Sam (4 April 1775 in Petticoat Lane, London – 3 July 1816), was a professional boxing pioneer and was active between the years 1801 and 1814. Known as the hardest hitter of his era, he earned the nickname "The Man with the Iron Hand". He was also known as "The Terrible Jew" referencing his Jewish ancestry.

== Early life ==
Dutch Sam was born in Whitechapel, East London on 4 April 1775 to a family of Jewish emigres from Holland. He suffered antisemitism like most Jewish immigrants of his era and at a young age, in common with many other Jewish boys from the East End of London, he joined Daniel Mendoza's Boxing Academy to quickly learn the art of self-defense.

== Pro career ==
Sam is best known as "the discoverer of the right hand uppercut. In Sam's day it was called an undercut. He created havoc with the new blow until a new way was found to block it." An essential element of the modern boxer's arsenal, it is one of the two main punches that count in statistics as power punches. Sam's downfall was his habitual reliance on alcohol. He bragged of downing as much as three glasses of gin three times a day, and whether his drinking was this frequent or not, it gradually robbed him of his strength and stamina.

It is generally believed Sam had his first fight in Enfield, England on 12 October 1801. Little is known of the match, and though according to the Boxing Register of the International Boxing Hall of Fame, records show that Sam met Harry Lee for five Guineas and defeated him.

Sam's second and less well-publicized fight was against a Shipley, known as the "Champion of the Broadway", and though he won against the heavier 196 pound boxer, he received less for the fight.

=== Caleb Baldwin fight ===
On 7 August 1804, he fought Caleb Baldwin, the pride of Westminster, a more experienced boxer who was at least seven pounds heavier and around seven years older. They fought for a more substantial stake of 25 English Guineas. For the first nineteen rounds, Caleb had the advantage, having landed a dangerous blow to Sam's temple in the ninth, which caused the odds on Baldwin to increase to 4-1. By the 20th round, Sam turned the tide of the battle using his signature upper cut, inflicting serious damage on Baldwin. In the 37th round, Baldwin was rendered unconscious by a flurry of uppercuts dealt by Sam and had to be carried from the ring.

=== Three bouts with Tom Belcher ===
On 8 February 1806, he fought one of a series of three bouts with Tom Belcher, at Virginia Water in Northern Surrey. In a match that was described as "one of the best contested and most skillful battles ever witnessed," In a close match, the betting first turned to Sam's favor as 7-4 in the tenth. Sam's strength, stamina, and endurance prevailed in the later stages of the bout, and Belcher had to yield in the 57th round. Belcher, an accomplished boxer, was the brother of Jem Belcher, a London heavyweight champion. In a second bout with Belcher on 28 July 1807, at Mouley Hurst, the match was declared a draw when Belcher's seconds declared a foul in the 34th round, though no decision was made. The London Morning Chronicle wrote that Sam appeared to increase in strength in the later rounds. Apparently Sam had accidentally hit Belcher in the face as he was falling over with a hand just touching the ring, a violation of the London Prize Rules. In their third and last fight, on 21 August 1807, at Crawley Common, Sam was seconded by Daniel Mendoza, as he had been in the first two fights. The match lasted 36 rounds and Sam's superior punching power and endurance led to Belcher's defeat. In the cruel, unregulated rules of the London Prize Ring, in the eighteenth round, Sam punched Belcher in the head while holding him by the neck, causing him to drop to the ground. The tactic, then known as fibbing, is illegal in modern boxing rules. Sam used his right expertly and with strength according to the London Times, but his left was used primarily for stopping his opponent and feinting. While Belcher left the ring nearly unconscious, Sam's most notable injury was a black eye.

More controversial than his victories over Belcher, Sam met a Wandsworth butcher, James Brown at Wimbledon common, in an impromptu battle where Sam finally met his match with a stronger boxer. Though Sam was knocked down twelve times, Pierce Egan, the most noted boxing historian of the era, defended Sam, believing he had fought mostly a defensive battle and might have dominated his opponent if he had had a financial stake in the outcome of the match.

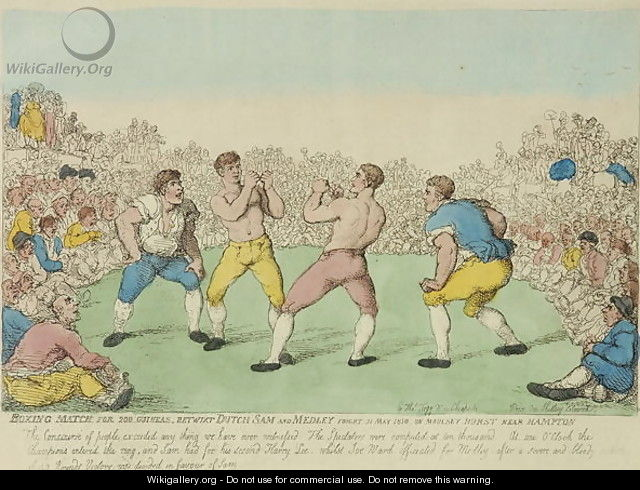
1810s Artist depiction of Dutch Sam vs. Bill Medley

After his defeats of Belcher, he had spectacular victories over Bill Cropley in 1808 and Ben Medley in 1810. The first battle was fought at around 154 pounds, and though Cropley was the slightly heavier opponent by around fourteen pounds, Sam persevered and seemed to have the upper hand throughout the match. The bout lasted around 25 minutes. Sam then defeated Ben Medley for a purse of 200 Guineas on 31 May 1810 in 39 rounds at Moulsey Hurst near Hampton in the London borough of Richmond.

On 21–23 December 1812, Sam performed in a sparring exhibition, with the boxer Bill Cropley and two others in the Theatre Royal Pavilion on Newcastle Street.

== Last match with Nosworthy and death ==
After a four year retirement from the ring, Sam attempted an ill-advised last fight on 8 December 1814 against Devonshire baker William Knowlesworthy, a name written as Nosworthy in current historical records. Knowlesworthy was a younger boxer around 28, to Sam's advancing and hard-fought 39 years. As a result of age and inadequate training, he lost to Knowlesworthy after 40 total rounds, though he showed signs of fatigue as early as the fourth when he was knocked to the mat by his younger opponent. The modern Boxing Register lists the total rounds as 9, though according to a ringside reporter of the London Times, an additional 31 rounds were begun shortly after the 9th, though the outcome of the fight seemed determined by the ninth. Feeling overconfident before the match, Sam had requested a smaller ring of only 20 feet square believing it would improve his chance of winning, but in a battle where he was overpowered, he had less time to backpedal and rest. Of the ninth round, the London Times wrote, "it was evident if Sam was doing his best but either from age or condition, he was no match for the baker". His East London Jewish backers grieved the loss of their champion, particularly since many had placed heavy wagers on Sam, a pre-fight 4-1 favorite.

Sam retired from boxing with a wrecked constitution after his 1814 fight and lived the brief remainder of his life in misery. He died on 3 July 1816 in a London hospital and was buried in the Jewish section of "Brady Street Cemetery" in Whitechapel in Bethnel Green in the East End of London. He had complained that several broken ribs he had received from his battle with Knowlesworthy when he was thrown against the ground stakes used in each corner of the London Prize Ring had not mended properly, nor been properly treated. The Brady Street Cemetery was closed for use in 1867.

== Honors and acclaimations ==
Dutch Sam was elected into the International Boxing Hall of Fame, "Pioneer" Category in 1997, and was an inductee of the International Jewish Sports Hall of Fame in 2011.

In his obituary in Bells Weekly, a London newspaper, a reporter observed "as a fighter he had no equal. He was the greatest exponent of science and terrific hitting the ring has ever seen. Had he taken proper care of himself, he might have lived to a good, ripe old age and held the championship for many years..."

The greatest boxing authority of the era, Pierce Egan, declared that Sam was a fighter unsurpassed for ‘force’ and ‘ponderosity’, and that his ‘blows were truly dreadful to encounter’ (Boxiana, vol. 1).

Renowned twentieth century boxing historian Nat Fleischer believed that during his career, Sam was "feared as the deadliest puncher of the London Prize Ring"

The Boxing Register, publication of the International Boxing Hall of Fame, consider Dutch Sam and Daniel Mendoza the two greatest Jewish boxers of the Pioneer era of boxing.

== In popular culture ==
Dutch Sam features as a character in Rodney Stone, a Gothic mystery and boxing novel by Sir Arthur Conan Doyle.

== Personal life ==
Dutch Sam's son, Young Dutch Sam, was also a bare-knuckle boxer.

== Selected bouts ==
7 Wins, 1 No decision, 1 Loss
Result	Opponent	Date	Location	Result/Duration	Notes
Win	Harry Lee	12 Oct 1801	----	----	First known match
Win	Caleb Baldwin	7 Aug 1804	Woodford Green, England	37 rounds	Caleb was highly skilled Important match
Win	Bill Britton	27 Apr 1805	Shepperton, England	30 Rounds	Lesser known match
Win	Tom Belcher	8 February 1806	Virginia Water, Eng.	57 rounds	Strength and endurance prevailed
*Draw*	Tom Belcher	28 July 1807	Moulsey Hurst, England	34 rounds, No decision	Foul in round 34
Win	Tom Belcher	21 Aug 1807	Crawley Common, England	36 rounds	Sam had superior punching power
Win	Bill Cropley	10 May 1808	------	25 minutes	Cropley was heavier by a stone
Win	Ben Medley	6 June and/or 10 May 1810	Moulsey Hurst, England	49 rounds	------
Loss	Bill Nosworthy	8 Dec 1814	Moulsey Hurst, England	9 rounds	Sam not in condition after 4 year layoff
