= Barney Aaron =

English bare-knuckle boxer (1800–1859)

Personal information
- Nickname: "The Star of the East"
- Nationality: English
- Born: 21 November 1800 Aldgate, London, England
- Died: 11 July 1859 (aged 58) Whitechapel, London, England
- Height: 5 ft 8 in (1.73 m)
- Weight: Around 138 lb (63 kg), lightweight

Boxing career
- Stance: Orthodox

Boxing record
- Total fights: 11
- Wins: 7
- Losses: 4

Barney Aaron (21 November 1800 at Aldgate – 11 July 1859 in Whitechapel, London) was an English bare-knuckle boxer.

Aaron, the father of Hall of Famer Young Barney Aaron, began boxing in 1819, and became a leading lightweight contender in the 1820s, arguably the top-rated lightweight of the era in England. Known as The Star of the East, he was inducted into the International Boxing Hall of Fame in 2001.

== Ascending the lightweight ranks, 1819–1823 ==
Aaron's earliest victory was against the far more experienced William Connelly, whom he beat in sixteen rounds and thirty minutes in 1819. One of his first losses was against the stronger and heavier Manny Lyons, who caused Aaron to quit from exhaustion after 70 grueling rounds, though Aaron soon avenged the loss in a fifty-minute rematch victory.

His wins between 1823 and 1824 against Ned Stockton, Lenney, Frank Redmond, and Peter Warren earned him a reputation as one of the best lightweights in England.

In his 6 May 1823 bout with Ned Stockton, Aaron won convincingly in an important 40-round contest at Blindlow Heath in Sussex.

Although Lenney, his next opponent, appeared game and made a noble effort, he had little chance against Aaron, who dominated and won a decision in eleven rounds at Harpenden Common on 5 August 1823. Each boxer took £25 for their efforts. In a rematch in November at Moulsey Hurst, the Bristol Mercury admitted that both boxers showed a great deal of "science" in their display, but that Aaron took most of the rounds and proved the better fighter. Drawing more attention and a larger crowd, the purse was £50 for each boxer.

=== Major win against Peter Warren, 1824 ===
His victory over the taller Peter Warren on 6 April 1824 in Colbrook, England was decisive and Aaron clearly led the fighting in the last fifteen of the twenty-nine rounds. In the first, Aaron caught Warren's head under his arm and hit him in the mouth, a move then known as "fibbing" and clearly illegal in today's boxing, governed by Marquess of Queensberry Rules. In the second and strongly in the fifth, Aaron threw Warren, a move legal under Broughton's Rules, and in the seventh, Aaron achieved a knock down. In the tenth, Warren caught Aaron around the neck with his left, and hit him repeatedly with his right, though Aaron quickly escaped. Exhausted and struggling, Warren was thrown down heavily in the thirteenth. After leading the second half of the match, in the 29th Aaron sent Warren reeling to the ground from a blow to the head that resulted in a knockout. London's Morning Chronicle wrote that "Barney has shown himself to be one of the best of his weight", though the reporter considered Warren to have the greater science and ring craft in his boxing. His victory over Warren cemented Aaron's claim as the top English lightweight contender.

== Boxing decline 1824–1834 ==
=== Arthur Matthewson, 1824 ===
Aaron lost a fierce 57 round bout to Arthur Matthewson on 21 June 1824 at a ring near Colbrook, England for the impressive sum of £100 a side. Barney was said to weigh slightly over 140 pounds to Matthewson's 135 and had a two-inch advantage in height. Aaron's chief second, Abraham "Abby" Belasco, and his financial backer Mr. Solomon accompanied him to the fight via coach. A major London newspaper, The Observer noted that Aaron's Jewish supporters were a majority of the crowd, comprising around sixty percent, but referred to them using the ethnic slur Sheenies. Aaron led in the early betting 5–4. The Observer clearly viewed the contest as a battle between Jew and Christian, though it admitted the Jewish supporters who favored Aaron did so on account of his "strength, his courage, and unwitting perseverance" and noted that in the close early rounds, Aaron's overzealous Jewish supporters were taking the rather unrealistic odds of 40–1. In the 17th, Aaron was floored by a blow from Matthewson that ended the round. The majority of the early rounds saw no clear advantage to either boxer, but as late as the 42nd through 49th, Aaron seemed to take a clear lead. In the 47th, Aaron got Matthewson in a headlock and hit him repeatedly, a tactic known as "chancery", though Matthewson recovered quickly. As the tide turned in the 50th through 56th, Aaron received severe blows to the body and head, silencing Barney's Jewish supporters. Aaron was finally knocked out in the 59th by a severe blow to the neck that threw him to the ground and left him senseless for a period of several minutes. Touting a common anti-Semitic stereotype, the Observer implied that unlike Aaron, Matthewson had more than purely pecuniary or financial motives for his win, and noted that in their disappointment over Aaron's loss, his Jewish followers acted like dogs, not reasoning human beings. In a contrasting salute to the character of Aaron, The Observer noted that Aaron "fought with great courage and firmness", and if not for Matthewson's final blow in the 57th, may have won the bout.

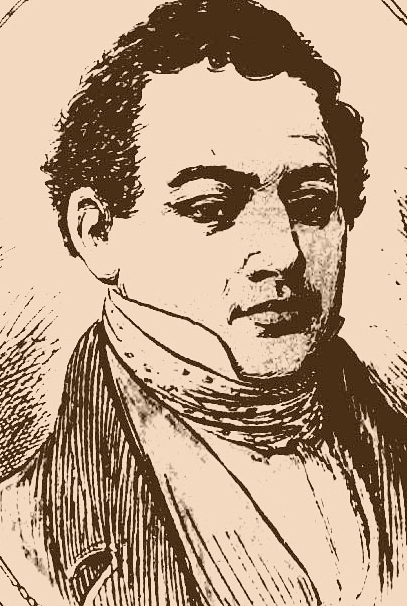
Dick Curtis

=== Dick Curtis, and Frank Redmond ===
In a downward spiral on 27 February 1827, Aaron lost to the well known English opponent Dick Curtis in fifty minutes on a stage in Andover, England. Though Arron stood to profit from the £100 purse, Curtis was a threatening opponent, and though slightly shorter, he was an accomplished boxer, two years younger, and had easily defeated the skilled Peter Warren in four previous contests. As expected, Curtis was favored in the opening betting at 6–4. Aaron fared well in the first three rounds, but the momentum slowly turned and by the fifth he got far worse in a vicious exchange where his face was clearly injured. In the ninth round, only fifty minutes into the contest, Curtis floored Aaron with a blow that reflected "his whole force", on Barney's throat knocking him out and ending the match.

Harry Broome

Aaron enjoyed his last decisive win, and took £50 for a 42-round victory against Frank Redmond on 23 October 1827, near St. Albans, England. In the 22nd and 23rd, the exhausted Redmond was down, and in the remaining rounds, despite his opponent's speed and skill, Aaron's strength prevailed, and Redmond's seconds threw in the towel in the 42nd round.

His last fight was a loss to Tom Smith, a Sailor seven years younger, on 1 April 1834 for £50 a side. Aaron lost the twenty round bout at Greenstreet Green, Kent that may have been attended by as many as 1000 people, a very impressive turnout for a boxing match in that era. The Morning Chronicle noted that "Barney fought with great bravery, but his day has gone by and like the worn out post horse, he can no longer answer to the whip".

On 16 March 1840, Aaron performed in an exhibition at the prestigious National Baths on Westminster Road in London. Also appearing were Deaf Smith, Peter Reid, Owen Smith and Tom Cribb. On 1 March 1846, Aaron acted as Master of Ceremonies for a benefit given for future English champion Harry Broome that included sparring by Broome, his brother Johnny, Joe Rowe and Johnny Walker.

== Retirement careers ==
=== Support for Lionel Rothschild ===
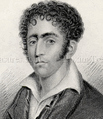
Boxer Abey Belasco, 1828

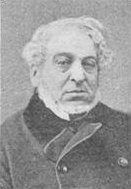
Lionel Rothschild in later life

Showing his support for the London working class and members of his own religion during the election of August 1847, Aaron and fellow Jewish boxer Aby Belasco led a lightly armed band of protestors with bludgeons patrolling and protecting the streets of London's East end in support of the election of the wealthy Jewish patron, and emerging politician Lionel de Rothschild to membership in the House of Commons for the City of London. Aaron and his followers were referred to with disgust in a letter to the English newspaper the Liverpool Albion as "the lowest class of Jews in the east of London", and condemned for injuring the cause for which they marched. Though he won by a large margin, receiving 6,792 votes, Rothschild would not be allowed to serve in Commons without taking a vow as a Christian upon a New Testament, which as a Jew, he refused to do. The House of Commons then wrote the Jewish Disabilities Bill allowing Jews to serve in Commons by taking a modified oath, but it was rejected repeatedly by the House of Lords, and though serving for a year in the Commons and winning subsequent elections by larger margins, Rothschild did not officially take the oath of office as a Jew until 1858, a year before Aaron's death. There were accusations that Lionel Rothschild's family bought votes, and paid Aaron and his band to patrol the streets during the voting week in August 1847, but this was never proven, and seemed unlikely as both sides of the vote were large in number. The family did expend capital to bring East end voters, many supporters of Aaron, to the polls free of charge. Rothschild's candidacy was supported by Benjamin Disraeli, a rising voice in the House of Commons since 1837 and its most prominent Jewish member. Both Rothschild and Disraeli believed the English government could form an alliance with the working classes of London, who at the time had limited social mobility, and lacked the right to vote. Aligned with Aaron and his brethren, Rothschild hoped to bring Jewish emancipation into the broader platform of the civil and religious liberties promised by his Liberal party. Disraeli was eventually successful in extending the vote to certain members of the English male working class in the Reform Act 1867, the type of legislation that Aaron and his band may have marched for twenty years earlier.

=== Ringside attendant ===
In his retirement, he acted as a ringside attendant for important fights. During this period he acted as a second to John Barleycorn in 1839. Later he acted as an attendant in the English championship fight between Ben Caunt and Bendigo, the boxer William Thompson, in Suffolk in September, 1845, a long brutal bout where Barney was forced to hold back angry spectators in several rounds. He later worked as a fishmonger, and may have worked for a period as a Constable in London, once apprehending two men who were suspected of robbing houses in his neighborhood of Houndsditch.

He was one of a number of Jewish boxers of the era whose popularity is credited with helping improve the social standing of Jews in England at a time when anti-Semitism was common. Despite his boxing success, Aaron never lived far from the poverty of East London and its struggling Jewish population. He died at the age of 58 in East London's Whitechapel.

== Selected bouts ==
7 Wins, 4 Losses
Result	Opponent	Date	Location	Duration	Notes
Win	William Connelly	1819	----	16 rounds, 30 mins	
Loss	Tom Collins	19 May 1823	Moulsey Hurst, Surrey, Eng.	Stopped due to injury, 30 minutes	
Win	Ned Stockton	6 May 1823	Blindlow Heath, Sussex, Eng.	40 rounds	
Win	Lenney	5 August 1823	Harpenden Common, Eng.	11 rounds	
Win	Lenney	11 November 1823	Moulsey Hurst	21 rounds	Lenney was outmatched and quit the fight
Win	Frank Redmond	30 December 1823	Moulsey Hurst	29 rounds	Aaron dominated til Redmond's seconds stopped the bout
Win	Peter Warren	6 April 1824	Colbrook, England	29 rounds	Threw Warren twice and gained decisive knockout
Loss	Arthur Matthewson	21 June 1824	Near Colbrook	57 rounds	Appeared to lead in late rounds 42–49, but fell behind in later rounds and was knocked out in 56th
Loss	Dick Curtis	27 Feb 1827	Andover, England	50 minutes	For £100, Aaron knocked out in brutal loss
Win	Frank Redmond	23 Oct 1827	Near St. Albans, England	42 Rounds	
Loss	Tom Smith	1 April 1834	Greenstreet Green, Kent, England	20 Rounds	Last fight

== Personal ==
- He was the father of British-born American boxer Young Barney Aaron, also entered in the Boxing Hall of Fame.

== See also ==
- List of select Jewish boxers
