= Boxing in the 1960s =

During the 1960s, boxing, like mostly everything else around the world, went through changing times. Notable was the emergence of a young boxer named Cassius Clay, who would, in his own words shock the world, declare himself against war, and change his name to Muhammad Ali.

Among significant boxers in lower weights, were middleweights Emile Griffith, Nino Benvenuti and Dick Tiger, and lightweights Joe Brown, Carlos Ortiz and Ismael Laguna as also bantamweight Eder Jofre. The first world champions from Venezuela, Brazil and Thailand were crowned during the 1960s, and the WBA and WBC started competing against each other, after the WBA changed its name from the National Boxing Association in 1962 and a group split from the WBA in 1963 to form the WBC.

A new division was created in the Jr. Middleweights, where a high school teacher, Freddie Little, was crowned world champion. Fights were seen on color television for the first time, and one of the most famous tragedies, Benny Kid Paret's, was also shown live on TV.

== 1960 ==
- January 22 – In the first world title fight of the decade, Paul Pender defeats Sugar Ray Robinson by a fifteen-round split decision, taking the New York and Massachusetts version of the world Middleweight title, in Boston.
- March 16, 1960– Filipino Gabriel Flash Elorde wrested the world junior lightweight championship by knocking out American defending titlist Harold Gomes in seven rounds ending the country's 20-year boxing championship drought and heralding his own seven-year reign in the division.
- April 16 – Pone Kingpetch becomes Thailand's first world champion, beating Pascual Pérez by a fifteen-round split decision for the world's Flyweight title in Bangkok, Thailand.
- April 20 – Gene Fullmer draws in fifteen rounds with Joey Giardello to retain the more widely recognized, National Boxing Association world Middleweight title, Bozeman.
- June 20 – Floyd Patterson becomes the first Heavyweight in history to win the world Heavyweight title twice, knocking out his former conqueror, Ingemar Johansson in five rounds at New York City.
- June 29 – Gene Fullmer retains the NBA world Middleweight title with a twelfth-round knockout of Carmen Basilio, at Salt Lake City.
- September 22 – In a rematch for the world Flyweight title, Pone Kingpetch retains the crown by beating Pascual Perez by a knockout in round eight, Los Angeles.
- October 29 – 1960 Olympic light heavyweight boxing champion Cassius Clay made his professional debut in a 6-round unanimous decision victory over Tunney Hunsaker.
- November 18 – Eder Jofre becomes world champion for the first time, knocking out Eloy Sanchez in six rounds to claim the world Bantamweight title in Los Angeles.
- December 3 – Gene Fullmer and Sugar Ray Robinson fight for the third time, and Fullmer retains the NBA's world Middleweight title with a fifteen-round draw, Los Angeles.

== 1961 ==
- January 14 – Paul Pender knocks out Terry Downes in the 7th round to retain the world middleweight title in Boston.
- February 2 – Harold Johnson defeats Jesse Bowdry to win the vacant NBA light heavyweight title by 9th-round TKO.
  - Cassius Clay defeats Jim Robinson by 1st-round KO.
- March 4 – Sugar Ray Robinson's last world title attempt, as he and Gene Fullmer close their rivalry with Fullmer retaining the National Boxing Association's world Middleweight title with a fifteen-round unanimous decision at Las Vegas.
- March 13 – Floyd Patterson and Ingemar Johansson finish their trilogy of fights, with Patterson retaining the world Heavyweight title with a sixth-round knockout in Miami Beach, Florida.
- April 1 – Emile Griffith becomes world champion for the first time, and begins his trilogy of fights with Benny Kid Paret, defeating the Cuban boxer by a thirteenth-round knockout to win the world's Welterweight title, Miami.
- September 30 – In their second of three bouts, Benny Paret regains the world Welterweight title with a fifteen-round split decision win over Emile Griffith, Madison Square Garden, New York City.
- October 21 – Duilio Loi retains his world Jr. Welterweight title with a fifteen-round draw against Eddie Perkins. Referee Nello Barrovecchio decides to entertain the fight goers by bending down, picking some coins that had been thrown by the fight fans into the ring, and then bowing to the fans during round eight of the bout, in Milan, Italy.
- December 9 – NBA world Middleweight champion Gene Fullmer retains the crown with a tenth-round knockout of world Welterweight champion Benny Paret in Las Vegas.

== 1962 ==
- February 10 – Young Cassius Clay, fighting in his tenth professional bout, recovers from his first knockdown, a first-round fall, to beat Sonny Banks by knockout in round four, Madison Square Garden, New York City.
- March 24 – One of boxing's most famous tragedies happens when Emile Griffith knocks out Benny Kid Paret in round twelve, to claim the world's Welterweight title. Paret is taken to the hospital, where he subsequently dies.
- April 3 – Benny Paret dies.
- April 21 – Carlos Ortiz becomes world Lightweight champion with a fifteen-round unanimous decision win over Joe Brown in Las Vegas.
- July 13 – In his first fight since the Benny Paret tragedy, Emile Griffith retains the world Welterweight title with a fifteen-round unanimous decision of future world Jr. Middleweight champion Ralph Dupas in Las Vegas.
- September 25 – Sonny Liston becomes world Heavyweight champion, knocking out Floyd Patterson in the first round, at Chicago.
- October 10 – Fighting Harada becomes world Flyweight champion, knocking out Pone Kingpetch in eleven rounds, Tokyo, Japan.
- October 23 – Dick Tiger becomes world Middleweight champion, defeating Gene Fullmer by a fifteen-round unanimous decision in San Francisco.
- November 15 – Muhammad Ali (then Cassius Clay) knocks out former world Light Heavyweight champion Archie Moore in five rounds at Los Angeles.
- December 20 – Denny Moyer becomes the first world champion in history in the brand new Jr. Middleweight division, defeating Joey Giambra by a fifteen-round decision for the vacant title, Portland.

== 1963 ==
- February 23 – Dick Tiger retains his world Middleweight title with a fifteen-round draw (tie) against former world champion Gene Fullmer in their Las Vegas rematch.
- March 13 – Cassius Clay defeats Doug Jones by a close (scores of 96–95, 96–95 and 99–92) but unanimous decision, Madison Square Garden, New York City.
- March 21 – A world title double header in Los Angeles: Luis Rodriguez wins the world Welterweight title by defeating Emile Griffith with a fifteen-round decision. Then, the double header turns tragic when Sugar Ramos takes the world Featherweight title away from Davey Moore, who would later die of the injuries suffered in the bout.
- March 25 – Davey Moore dies in Los Angeles. His death led to Pope John XXIII's describing of boxing as barbaric, and to Bob Dylan's song Who Killed Davey Moore?.
- June 1 – Willie Pastrano wins the world Light-Heavyweight title with a fifteen-round decision over Harold Johnson, Las Vegas.
- June 8 – Emile Griffith recovers the world Welterweight title by defeating Luis Rodriguez with a fifteen-round decision in New York.
- June 18 – Cassius Clay suffers a knockdown at the end of round four at the hands of Henry Cooper, and then, he rips off his glove in the corner before round five, making trainer Angelo Dundee go to the locker room to get a new glove, and giving him time to recover. Cooper succumbed to his tendency to cut and with blood streaming down his face, the referee was forced to stop the fight in round five, London.
- July 22 – Sonny Liston again defeats Floyd Patterson by a knockout in the first round, this time retaining the world Heavyweight title, Las Vegas.
- August 10 – Gene Fullmer's last fight, as he gets knocked out in eight rounds by world Middleweight champion Dick Tiger in Ibadan, Nigeria. To Fullmer's surprise, about 1,000 of Tiger's fans greet him outside the stadium after the fight, to applaud him and express admiration.
- December 7 – Joey Giardello becomes world Middleweight champion with a fifteen-round decision win over Dick Tiger, Atlantic City.
- December 20 – Rubin Carter produces one of Emile Griffith's two knockout defeats, scoring a technical knockout over the world Welterweight champion in round one of a non-title bout, Pittsburgh.

== 1964 ==
- February 15 – Carlos Ortiz retains the world lightweight title with a fourteenth-round knockout of world Jr. Lightweight champion Flash Elorde, Manila, Philippines.
- February 25 – Cassius Clay, in his own words, shocks the world, with a seventh-round knockout of Sonny Liston to win the world's Heavyweight title, in Miami.
- April 18 – Eddie Perkins retains the world Jr. Welterweight title over Bunny Grant, who was attempting to be Jamaica's first boxing world champion, with a fifteen-round decision, Kingston, Jamaica.
- May 9 – Sugar Ramos retains the world Featherweight title with a controversial fifteen-round decision over Floyd Robertson, Accra, Ghana.
- June 12 – Emile Griffith and Luis Rodriguez close their series of bouts, with Griffith retaining the world's Welterweight title with a fifteen-round decision.
- September 26 – Vicente Saldivar wins the world Featherweight title, knocking out Sugar Ramos in round twelve at Mexico City, Mexico.
- December 14 – Joey Giardello defeats Rubin Carter by a fifteen-round unanimous decision to retain the world Middleweight title, in Philadelphia. Giardello would later sue producers of The Hurricane for the way in which this fight was depicted in that film.

== 1965 ==
- January 18 – Carlos Hernandez defeats Eddie Perkins in a 15-round decision to win the world super-lightweight title in Caracas, becoming Venezuela's first world boxing champion.
- March 5 – Ernie Terrell becomes the WBA world Heavyweight champion, beating Eddie Machen by a fifteen-round decision, in Chicago.
- March 30 – José Torres becomes the first Hispanic Light-Heavyweight champion in history, knocking out Willie Pastrano in nine rounds at New York City. Emile Griffith retains his world Welterweight title with a fifteen-round decision over Jose Stable as part of the same program.
- April 10 – Ismael Laguna defeats Carlos Ortiz by a fifteen-round decision in Panama City, Panama, to win the world's Lightweight title.
- May 18 – Fighting Harada defeats Eder Jofre in Nagoya, Japan to win the world Bantamweight title.

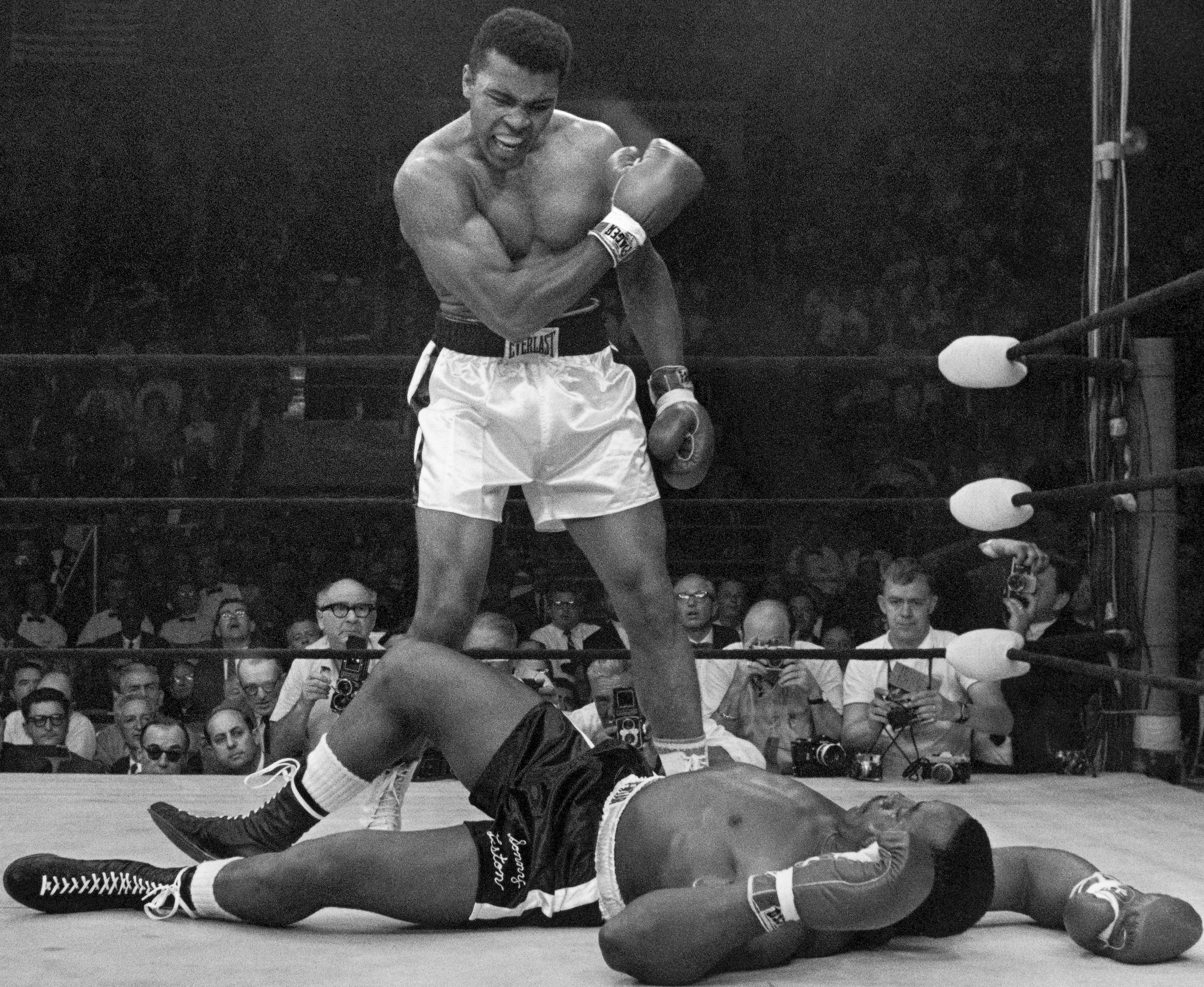
Ali standing over Liston

- May 25 – Muhammad Ali retains his WBC world Heavyweight title in a rematch with Sonny Liston, by knockout in round one. What proved to be one of the most controversial fights in boxing history (because few were able to see the knockout punch, the fight therefore became known as the Phantom Punch Fight) was also the world title fight that attracted the smallest number of live spectators in boxing history, fought in Lewiston, before a crowd of 2,434 people.
- September 7 – Vicente Saldivar retains his world Bantamweight title with a fifteen-round decision over future world champion Howard Winstone, London.
- October 21 – Dick Tiger regains the world Middleweight title, defeating Joey Giardello by a fifteen-round unanimous decision, New York.
- November 13 – Carlos Ortiz regains the world Lightweight title with a fifteen-round unanimous decision over Ismael Laguna, San Juan, Puerto Rico.
- November 22 – Muhammad Ali retains his world Heavyweight title with a twelfth-round knockout of former world champion Floyd Patterson, Las Vegas.
- December 10 – After a ceremony to honor Sugar Ray Robinson for his retirement (featuring former Robinson rivals Carmen Basilio, Gene Fullmer, Carl Olson and Randy Turpin), Emile Griffith retains his world Welterweight title with a fifteen-round decision over Mexican-American Manuel Gonzalez, in the first fight ever to be shown in color on television.

== 1966 ==
- March 1 – Horacio Accavallo beats Katsuyoshi Takayama by a fifteen-round decision in Tokyo, Japan, to win the vacant WBA and vacant WBC world Flyweight title, making Salvatore Burruni (the champion who was stripped of the title by the WBA & WBC) be, as of 2004, boxing's last undisputed linear world champion in the Flyweight division.
- March 29 – Muhammad Ali retains his WBC world Heavyweight title with a fifteen-round unanimous decision of George Chuvalo, Toronto, Canada.
- April 25 – Emile Griffith retains his world Middleweight title with a fifteen-round decision against Dick Tiger, New York City.
- May 21 – Muhammad Ali retains his world Heavyweight title with a sixth-round knockout win over a bloodied Henry Cooper, London.
- June 1 – Fighting Harada repeats his earlier victory over Eder Jofre, retaining the world's Bantamweight title by a fifteen-round decision in Tokyo. Jofre subsequently announces his retirement; he would return in 1970.
- June 14 – Salvatore Burruni's championship run at the Flyweights comes to a complete end when he loses his world belt (recognized by EBU & The Ring) by a decision in fifteen to Walter McGowan, Wembley, UK.
- July 13 – Emile Griffith defeats Joey Archer (the last man to beat Sugar Ray Robinson), by a fifteen-round decision to retain his world Middleweight title, New York.
- August 6 – Muhammad Ali defeats Brian London by 3rd-round KO to retain the WBC, NYSAC, and The Ring heavyweight titles
- September 10 – Muhammad Ali defeats Karl Mildenberger by 12th-round TKO to retain the WBC, NYSAC, and The Ring heavyweight titles
- October 22 – Carlos Ortiz beats Sugar Ramos by a knockout in five rounds to retain his world Lightweight title in Mexico City, Mexico, and a riot ensues. Many are hurt, including Ortiz's manager.
- November 14 – In what many consider to be his best career performance, Muhammad Ali defeats Cleveland Williams by a knockout in three at the Astrodome, Houston, to retain his WBC world Heavyweight title.
- November 22 – In a much anticipated rematch, Carlos Ortiz defeats world Jr. Lightweight champion Flash Elorde, once again, by knockout in round fourteen, to retain his world lightweight title, Madison Square Garden, New York.
- December 16 – Dick Tiger conquers the world Light-Heavyweight title, beating José Torres by a fifteen-round unanimous decision at the Madison Square Garden, New York.

== 1967 ==
- January 23 – In a rematch of their 1966 title fight, Emile Griffith again retains the world's Middleweight title with a fifteen-round decision over Joey Archer, New York City.
- February 5 – In another rematch of a 1966 world title fight, Dick Tiger retains his world Light-Heavyweight title with a fifteen-round split-decision over former world champion José Torres. Most of the public at the fight is dissatisfied with the decision and a large scale riot forms after the verdict is announced: chairs, bottles and other objects were thrown into the ring, at New York.
- February 6 – Muhammad Ali unifies his WBC world Heavyweight title with the WBA one, defeating the WBA's world champion Ernie Terrell by a fifteen-round unanimous decision in Houston's Astrodome, to become a two time undisputed heavyweight champion. Ali kept asking Terrell What's my name? throughout the contest (Terrell insisted on calling him Cassius Clay before the bout).
- March 22 – Muhammad Ali retains his world Heavyweight title with a seventh-round knockout of Zora Folley in what would be his last fight in three years, at New York.
- April 17 – Nino Benvenuti wins the world Middleweight title, defeating Emile Griffith by a fifteen-round unanimous decision, at New York.
- April 30 – Asian-American former Marine Paul Fujii wins the world Jr. Welterweight title, knocking out Sandro Lopopolo in the second round, Tokyo, Japan.
- June 15, 1967– Japanese Yoshiaki Numata ended Flash Elorde's seven-year reign as world junior lightweight champion by defeating the Filipino by split decision over 15 rounds in their title fight in Tokyo. Elorde with ten successful title defenses was the longest reigning champion in the history of the division.
- July 1 – In a rematch of their scandalous Mexico City, Mexico fight, Carlos Ortiz once again knocks out Sugar Ramos, this time in San Juan, Puerto Rico, in round four, to retain the world Lightweight title.
- August 18 – Carlos Ortiz retains his world Lightweight title in his rubber match with former world champion Ismael Laguna, by a fifteen-round unanimous decision, Shea Stadium, New York.
- September 29 – Emile Griffith recovers the world Middleweight title, with a fifteen-round majority decision over Nino Benvenuti in their New York rematch.
- December 14 – In the first world title fight in history between two Japanese fighters, Hiroshi Kobayashi, with only 11 knockout wins in fifty seven previous bouts, drops defending world Jr. Lightweight champion Yoshiaki Numata four times before knocking him out in twelve rounds to win the world title, Tokyo.

== 1968 ==
- February 26 – Australia's Lionel Rose beats world Bantamweight champion Fighting Harada by a fifteen-round unanimous decision to become boxing's first aborigine world champion in history, Tokyo, Japan.
- March 4 – Nino Benvenuti recovers the world's Middleweight title with a fifteen-round unanimous decision over Emile Griffith in their rubber match, in the main event of a card that also featured Joe Frazier's knockout in eleven over Buster Mathis, Madison Square Garden, New York City.
- April 27 – Jimmy Ellis wins the vacant WBA world Heavyweight championship, with a fifteen-round majority decision over Jerry Quarry, Oakland.
- May 24 – Bob Foster wins the world Light-Heavyweight title knocking out Dick Tiger in four rounds, New York. It was the only time in Tiger's career (he had fought 77 times before this) that he was knocked out, New York.
- June 25 – Carlos Cruz defeats Carlos Ortiz to win the world's Lightweight title by a fifteen-round unanimous decision, Santo Domingo, Dominican Republic.
- September 14 – Jimmy Ellis retains the WBA world Heavyweight title with a fifteen-round decision over Floyd Patterson, who was attempting to become the first boxer to hold the world Heavyweight title three times, in Stockholm, Sweden.
- December 6 – Lionel Rose retains his world Bantamweight title with a fifteen-round split decision over Chucho Castillo in Inglewood. The decision caused the ire of the pro-Castillo crowd, and a large scale riot ensued, fourteen people, including the one judge who scored the fight for Castillo, are hospitalized.
- December 12 – future Hall of Fame member Nicolino Locche of Argentina wins the world's Jr. Welterweight championship, knocking out Asian-American Paul Fujii out in ten rounds, at Tokyo.

== 1969 ==
- January 23 – World Light Heavyweight champion Bob Foster recovers from a knockdown to knock out challenger Frank DePaula, all within the first round, at the Madison Square Garden, New York City.
- February 18 – Mando Ramos wins the world Lightweight title, knocking out Carlos Cruz in eleven rounds, Los Angeles.
- March 17 – High school teacher Freddie Little becomes the world's Jr. Middleweight champion, defeating Stanley Hayward for the vacant world title, Las Vegas.
- April 18 – Cuban-Mexican José Nápoles becomes the world Welterweight champion, knocking out defending world champion Curtis Cokes in thirteen rounds, Inglewood.
- June 23 – Future world Heavyweight champion Joe Frazier defeats Jerry Quarry by knockout in round eight, New York.
- June 29 – José Nápoles retains his world Welterweight title with a tenth-round knockout of former world champion Curtis Cokes in their Mexico City, Mexico rematch.
- July 28 – World Featherweight champion Johnny Famechon of Australia retains his world title with a controversial fifteen-round decision over Fighting Harada, Sydney.
- August 22 – Rubén Olivares becomes world champion for the first time, knocking out world Bantamweight champion Lionel Rose in five rounds, Inglewood.
- October 4 – In another bout filled with controversy, Nino Benvenuti retains his world Middleweight title with a seventh-round disqualification of American challenger Fraser Scott, Naples, Italy.
- October 17 – World Welterweight champion José Nápoles retains his title with a fifteen-round unanimous decision win over Emile Griffith, Inglewood.
- November 22 – Nino Benvenuti retains his world Middleweight title with an eleventh-round knockout of former world Welterweight champion Luis Rodriguez, Rome, Italy.
