= Catchweight =

Negotiated weight limit in combat sport

A catchweight is a term used in combat sports, such as boxing or mixed martial arts, to describe a weight limit that does not adhere to the traditional limits for weight classes. In boxing, a catchweight is negotiated prior to weigh-ins, which are conducted one day before the fight. The term may be used in professional wrestling, but should not be confused with catch wrestling (a precursor to modern professional wrestling).

== Explanation ==
Strictly speaking, a catchweight in boxing is used to describe a weight limit for a fight that does not fall in line with the limits for the expanded weight classes. Catchweights were enacted after the traditional rules of weigh-ins, which take place on the day of a fight, were changed to that of the day before a fight. Likewise, catchweights were enacted following the expansion of the traditional eight weight divisions to seventeen.

An agreed weight was used to describe a catchweight traditionally when only eight-division limits existed and all weigh-ins were done "day or hours" before the fight. A historical marker that points to when "day of" fight weigh-ins ended is the advent of television. During the Muhammad Ali era (1960s–70s), boxing promotions began televising the weigh-in proceedings to generate publicity before the scheduled fights, necessitating a "day before" fight weigh-in.

Fighters can cut weight for a "day before" fight weigh-in with modern conditioning and training methods and regain the same weight on the "day of" the fight. The purpose of a catchweight is to compensate for the ability of bigger boxers to cut weight before a "day before" fight weigh-in and regain the weight to exceed the specified limit (division or catchweight) on the "day of" the fight with little effect on performance. The catchweight aims to provide a level playing field and to prevent weight mismatches that can endanger the fighters. More importantly, the catchweight ensures the fight is not cancelled due to potential last-minute disagreements on the fight time.

== Examples ==
A notable case of alleged weight mismatch is Arturo Gatti vs. Joey Gamache. Gatti defeated the former world champion Gamache by a knockout in the second round. After the bout, Gamache's handlers filed a lawsuit alleging Gatti had gained 19 pounds since the weigh-in the "day before" and thus had a large advantage over Gamache. This resulted in serious injuries to the smaller Gamache. After Gatti–Gamache, some boxing commissions started weighing boxers a second time.

Combat sports commonly have defined weight classes with specific weight limits. For example, each boxing division with the exception of heavyweight has its own weight classes, ranging from 105 pounds for minimumweight to 200 pounds for cruiserweight and varying in range in the weight classes in between. In order to fight for a championship in these weight classes, the fighters must come into the fight at or below said weight.

Cases can arise when a fight does not occur within a specific weight class limit. In certain cases, a contract for a fight will specify that the two fighters come into the fight at separate limits. Often, this limit is at a midpoint between two weight classes. Recent examples of catchweight fights where a weight limit was different from that of a defined weight class include the second fight between Jermain Taylor and Kelly Pavlik, which was fought at a catchweight of 166 pounds and the Félix Trinidad-Roy Jones Jr. fight, which was fought at 171 pounds.

In another example, fighters can agree to fight at a formal weight; however, at weigh-in, a fighter can come in over the formal weight. If so, the fight is not cancelled. Instead, an agreement may be reached to fight at a catchweight. Commonly, the fighter who comes in overweight pays a penalty, for example, a 20% penalty with 10% going to the fighter who made weight and 10% going to a commission sanctioning the fight. An example of this catchweight situation occurred at UFC 104 where Anthony Johnson came in over the welterweight limit of 170 for his fight against Yoshiyuki Yoshida. While commissions sometimes give a one-pound grace, Johnson came in at 176. An agreement was made that the fight would occur at a catchweight of 176.

Often, catchweight fights are still considered fights within a formal weight class. For example, when Manny Pacquiao fought Miguel Cotto, the fight was at a catchweight of 145 pounds to accommodate Pacquiao's smaller physique. Boxing has a junior welterweight weight class with a weight limit of 140 and a welterweight weight class with a weight limit of 147. Since the fight was under the 147 limit and above the 140 limit, the fight was considered a welterweight fight as well as a catchweight fight. In addition, the World Boxing Organization sanctioned this fight for the welterweight title since the fight was under the welterweight limit.

Another example was at UFC 99 when Wanderlei Silva fought Rich Franklin at a catchweight bout of 195 pounds. Silva typically fought at the light heavyweight weight class of 205 pounds, while Franklin fought at the middleweight weight class of 185 pounds. They agreed on a catchweight bout, and both men weighed in at 194 for the fight.
