= Phil Edwards (boxer) =

Welsh boxer (born 1936)

Personal information
- Nationality: Welsh
- Born: Philip Cilia; 12 May 1936 (age 90) Cardiff, Wales
- Weight: Middleweight

Boxing career
- Stance: Orthodox

Boxing record
- Total fights: 72
- Wins: 60
- Win by KO: 20
- Losses: 8
- Draws: 3
- No contests: 0

Philip Cilia (born 12 May 1936) was a Welsh Middleweight boxer who fought under the name Phil Edwards. Edwards was Wales middleweight champion from 1957 until his retirement in 1962. One of the best British fighters at his weight, Edwards was unfortunate to box during the reign of Terry Downes, and he twice failed in a challenge for the British title against Downes.

== Boxing career ==
Edwards was born in Cardiff, Wales in 1936 as Philip Cilia to a Maltese father and Welsh mother. He was orphaned at the age of 11, but was looked after by an older brother. Edwards showed promise as a young amateur boxer, winning many competitions and in 1951 he was awarded a watch by Field Marshal Montgomery after being named as best boxer at the annual British Schools Championship. Edwards was seen as a real British title challenger, and whilst an amateur, boxing writer Nat Fleischer described him as the ...best prospect I've seen since Sugar Ray Robinson.

Edwards turned professional at the age of 16, taking on his mother's maiden name. His first fight as a pro was against Fred Leek at the Drill Hall in Willenhall on 28 October 1952, and Edwards stopped his opponent in the second round via a knockout. Over the next two years Edwards was a regular at both Willenhall and the town hall at Walsall, with infrequent bouts in Cardiff and Birmingham. During this period he fought on 30 occasions, winning 25 of them. Then in 1956 Edwards took a forced break from fighting to complete his National Service, posted to Brecon with the South Wales Borderers.

Edwards returned to the ring in May 1956 against Fred Jeacock at the Embassy Sportsdrome in Birmingham. He stopped Jeacock in the third round through a technical knockout, and this victory began a string of 14 winning fights. This run, which included a win over Welsh light heavyweight champion, Noel Trigg, culminated in a title challenge against Freddie Cross for his Welsh middleweight belt. Cross and Edwards met at Pandy Park in Crosskeys on 21 August 1957, in a twelve-round contest. In the early stages of the fight, Cross appeared ahead on points but was knocked down in the eighth. Despite this, Edwards continued to chase the fight in the later rounds in an attempt to catch up on his poor early performance. When the referee made his decision to award the fight and the Welsh title to Edwards, after the bout went the full distance, there was uproar from the crowd. Chairs were thrown into the ring and the police were called to settle the 5,000 strong crowd. In the fray, Edward's manager Benny Jacobs, was injured by a member of the public who was attempting to take a kick at the new champion.

Edward's very next fight after his title success was against Nigerian boxing legend Dick Tiger. Tiger was a one-time world middleweight and light-heavyweight world champion, and Edwards showed his class by lasting the full ten rounds, losing on points. After the Tiger fight, Edwards was back to winning ways, and was victorious in his first four fights of 1958, defeating Commonwealth title challenger Lew Lazar, Scotland's John Woolard, journeyman Jimmy Lynas, and in his first overseas bout Edwards travelled to Gothenburg where he dispatched Swedish middleweight champion Olle Bengtsson. Edwards then faced Freddie Cross for a second time in a title defence of his Welsh middleweight belt. This time there was little controversy when Edwards was given a points decision.

On 30 September 1958, Edwards was given his first chance at the British middleweight title, recently vacated by the retired Pat McAteer. His opponent was Londoner Terry Downes, and Edward's team made the decision for him to sit back in the early rounds to play on Townes supposed weakness as a distance fighter. The strategy was a failure, as by the half way stage of the contest Edwards had taken too much punishment and he was unable to up his own work rate. The referee stopped the bout to save Edwards from further punishment in the thirteenth round. Edwards was given a second shot at the title in July 1960, after ten fights without loss. He again faced Downes, this time at the Empire Pool in Wembley. The fifteen round fight lasted only until the twelfth round, when Edwards was stopped by a technical knockout, it a hard-fought and frenetic contest that saw both men requiring stitches to the face after the bout.

After losing to Downes, Edwards took four months off, before returning to the ring to face Nigerian Orlando Paso. Despite having beaten Paso twice in earlier meetings, Edwards suffered a technical knockout in the fourth round, resulting in his first back-to-back losses of his professional career. Matters worsened in February 1961 when he fought John "Cowboy" McCormack, who had briefly held the British middleweight title in 1959. The match was an eliminator for another shot at the middleweight title and after the fight went the full distance, McCormack was given the decision. Edwards fought twice more in 1961, beating American Neal Rivers and Londoner Pat O'Grady. The next year was Edward's final year as a professional. He started well beating his first three opponents by points, but on 24 September he faced George Aldridge at Granby Halls in Leicester for another eliminator for the British title. The fight went the distance, but again Edwards came up short losing the decision. This was Edwards' last professional fight.

== Bibliography ==
- Jones, Gareth (2009). The Boxers of Wales: Cardiff. Cardiff: St David's Press. ISBN 978-1-902719-26-9.
- Jones, Wynford (2007). Benny's Boys: The Stable of Benny Jacobs. St Helens, Merseyside: Colourplan Design & Print. ISBN 978-0-9551082-1-1.
- Stead, Peter; Williams, Gareth, eds. (2008). Wales and its Boxers, The Fighting Tradition. Cardiff: University of Wales Press. ISBN 978-0-7083-1915-4.
