= List of world middleweight boxing champions =

== Championship recognition ==
=== 1884–1910 ===
Champions were recognized by public acclamation. A champion in that era was a fighter who had a notable win over another fighter and kept winning afterward. Retirements or disputed results could lead to a championship being split among several men for periods of time.

=== 1910–1961 ===
==== Championship awarding organizations ====
- The International Boxing Union (IBU), formed in Paris in 1910. Changed name to European Boxing Union in 1946. It organised world title fights from 1913 to 1963 after which it was incorporated into the World Boxing Council (WBC).
- The New York State Athletic Commission (NYSAC), formed in 1911 and then again in 1920 after it was originally disbanded in 1917. It organised world title bouts until the early 1970s when it became a member of World Boxing Council (WBC).
- The National Boxing Association (NBA) formed in the United States in 1921.
- The Ring magazine, which began awarding titles in 1922.
- Other bodies including the National Sporting Club in Great Britain and the California State Athletic Commission also awarded world titles.

An Australian version of the world title which existed briefly between 1914 and 1916 gained considerable credibility because its holder, Les Darcy, was widely believed to be best boxer in the world in this division.

=== 1961–present ===
==== Championship awarding organizations ====
- The World Boxing Association (WBA), founded in 1921 as the National Boxing Association (NBA); it changed its name in 1961 and allowed membership from outside the United States.
- The World Boxing Council (WBC), founded in 1963.
- The International Boxing Federation (IBF), founded in 1983.
- The World Boxing Organization (WBO), founded in 1988.

== List of champions ==
| Reign Began | Reign Ended | Champion | Recognition |
|---|---|---|---|
| 1884-07-30 | 1891-01-14 | (United States) Nonpareil Dempsey | World |
| 1891-01-14 | 1894-09-26 – Vacated | (United Kingdom) Bob Fitzsimmons | World |
| 1896-03-02 | 1897-12-17 – Vacated | (United States) Kid McCoy | World |
| 1897-12-20 | 1907-05-28 – Vacated | (United States) Tommy Ryan | World |
| 1907-12-12 | 1908-09-07 | (United States) Stanley Ketchel | World |
| 1908-09-07 | 1908-11-26 | (United States) Billy Papke | World |
| 1908-11-26 | 1910-10-15 – Died | (United States) Stanley Ketchel | World |
| 1913-03-5 | 1913-10-11 | (United States) Frank Klaus | World |
| 1913-10-11 | 1914-04-07 | (United States) George Chip | World |
| 1914-04-07 | 1917-11-14 | (United States) Al McCoy | World |
| 1917-11-14 | 1920-05-06 | (United States) Mike O'Dowd | World |
| 1920-05-06 | 1923-08-31 | (United States) Johnny Wilson | World |
| 1923-08-31 | 1926-02-26 | (United States) Harry Greb | World |
| 1926-02-26 | 1926-12-03 | (United States) Tiger Flowers | World |
| 1926-12-03 | 1929-10-29 – Vacated | (United States) Mickey Walker | World |
| 1932-01-25 | 1932-06-11 | (United States) Gorilla Jones | NBA |
| 1932-06-11 | 1932-07-04 | (France) Marcel Thil | NBA |
| 1933-01-13 | 1933-08-09 | (United States) Ben Jeby | NYSAC |
| 1933-08-09 | 1933-10-30 | (Canada) Lou Brouillard | NYSAC |
| 1933-10-30 | 1934-09-11 | (United States) Vince Dundee | World |
| 1934-09-11 | 1935-09-19 | (United States) Teddy Yarosz | World |
| 1935-09-19 | 1936-07-11 | (United States) Eddie Babe Risko | World |
| 1936-07-11 | 1938-07-26 | (United States) Freddie Steele | World |
| 1938-07-26 | 1938-11-01 | (United States) Al Hostak | NBA |
| 1938-11-01 | 1939-06-27 | (United States) Solly Krieger | NBA |
| 1938-11-18 | 1939-10-02 | (United States) Fred Apostoli | NYSAC |
| 1939-06-27 | 1940-07-19 | (United States) Al Hostak | NBA |
| 1939-10-02 | 1940-05-23 | (Philippines) Ceferino Garcia | NYSAC |
| 1940-05-23 | 1941-05-09 | (United States) Ken Overlin | NYSAC |
| 1940-07-19 | 1947-07-16 | (United States) Tony Zale | NBA |
| 1941-05-09 | 1941-10-31 | (United States) Billy Soose | NYSAC |
| 1941-11-28 | 1947-07-16 | (United States) Tony Zale | NYSAC |
| 1947-07-16 | 1948-06-10 | (United States) Rocky Graziano | NBA |
| 1948-06-10 | 1948-09-21 | (United States) Tony Zale | NBA |
| 1948-09-21 | 1949-06-16 | (France) Marcel Cerdan | NBA |
| 1949-06-16 | 1951-02-14 | (United States) Jake LaMotta | NBA |
| 1950-07-12 | 1951-02-14 | (United States) Jake LaMotta | NYSAC |
| 1951-02-14 | 1951-07-10 | (United States) Sugar Ray Robinson | World |
| 1951-07-10 | 1951-09-12 | (United Kingdom) Randy Turpin | World |
| 1951-09-12 | 1952-04-16 – Vacated | (United States) Sugar Ray Robinson | World |
| 1953-10-21 | 1955-12-09 | (Hawaii) Bobo Olson | World |
| 1955-12-09 | 1957-01-02 | (United States) Sugar Ray Robinson | World |
| 1957-01-02 | 1957-05-01 | (United States) Gene Fullmer | World |
| 1957-05-01 | 1957-09-23 | (United States) Sugar Ray Robinson | World |
| 1957-09-23 | 1958-03-25 | (United States) Carmen Basilio | World |
| 1958-03-25 | 1960-01-22 | (United States) Sugar Ray Robinson | The Ring Magazine title |
| 1959-08-28 | 1962-10-23 | (United States) Gene Fullmer | NBA |
| 1960-01-22 | 1961-07-11 | (United States) Paul Pender | The Ring Magazine title |
| 1961-07-11 | 1962-04-07 | (United Kingdom) Terry Downes | The Ring Magazine title |
| 1962-04-07 | 1962-04-07 – Vacated | (United States) Paul Pender | The Ring Magazine title |
| 1962-10-23 | 1963-12-07 | (Nigeria) Dick Tiger | Universal (WBA/WBC) |
| 1963-12-07 | 1965-10-21 | (United States) Joey Giardello | Universal (WBA/WBC) |
| 1965-10-21 | 1966-04-25 | (Nigeria) Dick Tiger | Universal (WBA/WBC) |
| 1966-04-25 | 1967-04-17 | (United States Virgin Islands) Emile Griffith | Universal (WBA/WBC) |
| 1967-04-17 | 1967-09-29 | (Italy) Nino Benvenuti | Universal (WBA/WBC) |
| 1967-09-29 | 1968-03-04 | (United States Virgin Islands) Emile Griffith | Universal (WBA/WBC) |
| 1968-03-04 | 1970-11-07 | (Italy) Nino Benvenuti | Universal (WBA/WBC) |
| 1970-11-07 | 1974-02-09 – Title split | (Argentina) Carlos Monzón | Universal (WBA/WBC) |
| 1976-06-26 | 1977-08-29 – Retired | (Argentina) Carlos Monzón | Universal (WBA/WBC) |
| 1980-09-27 | 1987-04-06 – Title split | (United States) Marvin Hagler | Universal (WBA/WBC/IBF) |
| 2004-09-18 | 2005-07-16 – Title lost | (United States) Bernard Hopkins | Universal (WBA/WBC/IBF/WBO) |
| 2005-07-16 | 2005-10-11 – Title split | (United States) Jermain Taylor | Universal (WBA/WBC/IBF/WBO) |
== WBC ==
Title inaugurated
| 1963-08-10 | 1963-12-07 | (Nigeria) Dick Tiger | WBC |
| 1963-12-07 | 1965-10-21 | (United States) Joey Giardello | WBC |
| 1965-10-21 | 1966-04-25 | (Nigeria) Dick Tiger | WBC |
| 1966-04-25 | 1967-04-17 | (United States Virgin Islands) Emile Griffith | WBC |
| 1967-04-17 | 1967-09-29 | (Italy) Nino Benvenuti | WBC |
| 1967-09-29 | 1968-03-04 | (United States Virgin Islands) Emile Griffith | WBC |
| 1968-03-04 | 1970-11-07 | (Italy) Nino Benvenuti | WBC |
| 1970-11-07 | 1974-02-09-Stripped | (Argentina) Carlos Monzon | WBC |
| 1974-05-25 | 1976-06-26 | (Colombia) Rodrigo Valdez | WBC |
| 1976-06-26 | 1977-08-29-Retired | (Argentina) Carlos Monzón | WBC |
| 1977-11-05 | 1978-04-22 | (Colombia) Rodrigo Valdez | WBC |
| 1978-04-22 | 1979-06-30 | (Argentina) Hugo Pastor Corro | WBC |
| 1979-06-30 | 1980-03-16 | (Italy) Vito Antuofermo | WBC |
| 1980-03-16 | 1980-09-27 | (United Kingdom) Alan Minter | WBC |
| 1980-09-27 | 1987-04-06 | (United States) Marvelous Marvin Hagler | WBC |
| 1987-04-06 | 1987-05-27-Vacated | (United States) Sugar Ray Leonard | WBC |
| 1987-10-29 | 1988-06-06 | (United States) Thomas Hearns | WBC |
| 1988-06-06 | 1989-02-24 | (United States) Iran Barkley | WBC |
| 1989-02-24 | 1989-12-07-Vacated | (Panama) Roberto Durán | WBC |
| 1990-11-24 | 1993-05-08 | (United States Virgin Islands) Julian Jackson | WBC |
| 1993-05-08 | 1994-05-07-Vacated | (United States) Gerald McClellan | WBC |
| 1995-03-17 | 1995-08-19 | (United States Virgin Islands) Julian Jackson | WBC |
| 1995-08-19 | 1996-03-16 | (United States) Quincy Taylor | WBC |
| 1996-03-16 | 1998-05-02 | (United States) Keith Holmes | WBC |
| 1998-05-02 | 1999-04-24 | (France) Hacine Cherifi | WBC |
| 1999-04-24 | 2001-04-14 | (United States) Keith Holmes | WBC |
| 2001-04-14 | 2005-07-16 | (United States) Bernard Hopkins | WBC |
| 2005-07-16 | 2007-09-29 | (United States) Jermain Taylor | WBC |
| 2007-09-29 | 2010-04-17 | (United States) Kelly Pavlik | WBC |
| 2010-04-17 | 2011-01-17-Stripped | (Argentina) Sergio Martínez | WBC |
| 2011-06-04 | 2012-09-15 | (Mexico) Julio César Chávez Jr. | WBC |
| 2012-09-15 | 2014-06-07 | (Argentina) Sergio Martínez | WBC |
| 2014-06-07 | 2015-11-17-Stripped | (Puerto Rico) Miguel Cotto | WBC |
| 2015-11-21 | 2016-05-18-Vacated | (Mexico) Saul Alvarez | WBC |
| 2016-05-18 | 2018-09-15 | (Kazakhstan) Gennady G. Golovkin | WBC |
| 2018-09-15 | 2019-06-27-Elevated to 'Franchise' Champion | (Mexico) Saul Alvarez | WBC |
| 2019-06-27 | 2024-05-07 | (United States) Jermall Charlo | WBC |
| 2024-05-07 | Present | (Dominican Republic) Carlos Adames | WBC |
== WBA ==
Title inaugurated
| 1962-10-23 | 1963-12-07 | (Nigeria) Dick Tiger | WBA |
| 1963-12-07 | 1965-10-21 | (United States) Joey Giardello | WBA |
| 1965-10-21 | 1966-04-25 | (Nigeria) Dick Tiger | WBA |
| 1966-04-25 | 1967-04-17 | (United States Virgin Islands) Emile Griffith | WBA |
| 1967-04-17 | 1967-09-29 | (Italy) Nino Benvenuti | WBA |
| 1967-04-17 | 1968-03-04 | (United States Virgin Islands) Emile Griffith | WBA |
| 1968-03-04 | 1970-11-04 | (Italy) Nino Benvenuti | WBA |
| 1970-11-07 | 1977-08-29-Retired | (Argentina) Carlos Monzon | WBA |
| 1977-11-05 | 1978-04-22 | (Colombia) Rodrigo Valdez | WBA |
| 1978-04-22 | 1979-06-30 | (Argentina) Hugo Pastor Corro | WBA |
| 1979-06-30 | 1980-03-16 | (Italy) Vito Antuofermo | WBA |
| 1980-03-16 | 1980-09-27 | (United Kingdom) Alan Minter | WBA |
| 1980-09-27 | 1987-Stripped | (United States) Marvin Hagler | WBA |
| 1987-10-23 | 1989-Stripped | (Italy) Sumbu Kalambay | WBA |
| 1989-05-10 | 1991-04-01-Vacated | (Jamaica) Mike McCallum | WBA |
| 1992-04-22 | 1993-10-01 | (United States) Reggie Johnson | WBA |
| 1993-10-01 | 1994-08-Vacated | (United States) John David Jackson | WBA |
| 1994-08-12 | 1995-12-19 | (Argentina) Jorge Fernando Castro | WBA |
| 1995-12-19 | 1996-06-24 | (Japan) Shinji Takehara | WBA |
| 1996-06-24 | 1997-08-23 | (United States) William Joppy | WBA |
| 1997-08-23 | 1998-01-31 | (Dominican Republic) Julio César Green | WBA |
| 1998-01-31 | 2001-05-12 | (United States) William Joppy | WBA |
| 2001-05-12 | 2001-09-29 | (Puerto Rico) Félix Trinidad | WBA |
| 2001-09-29 | 2005-07-16 | (United States) Bernard Hopkins | WBA Super Champion |
| 2001-11-17 | 2003-12-13-Lost to Super Champion | (United States) William Joppy | WBA Regular Champion |
| 2004-05-01 | 2006-03-11 | (New Zealand) Maselino Masoe | WBA Regular Champion |
| 2005-07-16 | 2006-12-14-Stripped | (United States) Jermain Taylor | WBA Super Champion |
| 2006-03-11 | 2006-07-15 | (Germany) Felix Sturm | WBA Regular Champion |
| 2006-07-15 | 2007-04-28 | (Spain) Javier Castillejo | WBA Regular Champion |
| 2007-04-28 | 2012-09-01 | (Germany) Felix Sturm | WBA Super Champion |
| 2010-10-14 | 2014-07-26 | (Kazakhstan) Gennady G. Golovkin | WBA Regular Champion/WBA |
| 2012-09-01 | 2012-11-02-Stripped | (Australia) Daniel Geale | WBA Super Champion |
| 2014-07-26 | 2018-09-15 | (Kazakhstan) Gennady G. Golovkin | WBA Super Champion |
| 2014-08-09 | 2017-03-18-Lost to Super Champion | (United States) Daniel Jacobs | WBA Regular Champion |
| 2017-05-20 | 2017-10-22 | (Cameroon) Hassan N'Dam N'Jikam | WBA Regular Champion |
| 2017-10-22 | 2018-10-20 | (Japan) Ryota Murata | WBA Regular Champion |
| 2018-10-20 | 2019-07-12 | (United States) Rob Brant | WBA Regular Champion |
| 2019-07-12 | 2021-01-01-Elevated to Super Champion | (Japan) Ryota Murata | WBA Regular Champion |
| 2018-09-15 | 2021-01-01-Vacated | (Mexico) Saul Alvarez | WBA Super Champion |
| 2021-01-05 | 2022-04-09 | (Japan) Ryota Murata | WBA Super Champion |
| 2021-05-01 | 2023-03-09 | (United States) Erislandy Lara | WBA Regular Champion |
| 2022-04-09 | 2023-03-09 | (Kazakhstan) Gennady G. Golovkin | WBA Super Champion |
| 2023-03-09 | Present | (United States) Erislandy Lara | WBA |
== IBF ==
Title inaugurated
| 1983-05-27 | 1987-04-06-Stripped | (United States) Marvin Hagler | IBF |
| 1987-10-10 | 1988-07-28 | (United States) Frank Tate | IBF |
| 1988-07-28 | 1991-05-10 | (United States) Michael Nunn | IBF |
| 1991-05-10 | 1993-02-13-Vacated | (United States) James Toney | IBF |
| 1993-05-22 | 1994-11-18-Vacated | (United States) Roy Jones Jr. | IBF |
| 1995-04-29 | 2005-07-16 | (United States) Bernard Hopkins | IBF |
| 2005-07-16 | 2005-10-11-Vacated | (United States) Jermain Taylor | IBF |
| 2005-12-10 | 2009-07-12-Vacated | (Germany) Arthur Abraham | IBF |
| 2009-09-19 | 2011-05-07 | (Germany) Sebastian Sylvester | IBF |
| 2011-05-07 | 2013-08-17 | (Australia) Daniel Geale | IBF |
| 2013-08-17 | 2013-12-07 | (United Kingdom) Darren Barker | IBF |
| 2013-12-07 | 2014-05-31 | (Germany) Felix Sturm | IBF |
| 2014-05-31 | 2014-10-08 | (Australia) Sam Soliman | IBF |
| 2014-10-08 | 2015-02-06-Stripped | (United States) Jermain Taylor | IBF |
| 2015-06-20 | 2015-10-17 | (Canada) David Lemieux | IBF |
| 2015-10-17 | 2018-06-01-Stripped | (Kazakhstan) Gennady G. Golovkin | IBF |
| 2018-10-27 | 2019-05-04 | (United States) Daniel Jacobs | IBF |
| 2019-05-04 | 2019-08-01-Stripped | (Mexico) Saul Alvarez | IBF |
| 2019-10-05 | 2023-02-06-Vacated | (Kazakhstan) Gennady G. Golovkin | IBF |
| 2023-07-01 | 2023-10-14 | (Germany) Vincenzo Gualtieri | IBF |
| 2023-10-14 | 2026-03-10-Stripped | (Kazakhstan) Janibek Alimkhanuly | IBF |
| 2026-08-08 | Present | (Republic of Ireland) Aaron McKenna | IBF |
== WBO ==
Title inaugurated
| 1989-04-18 | 1990-04-29 | (United States) Doug DeWitt | WBO |
| 1990-04-29 | 1990-11-18 | (United Kingdom) Nigel Benn | WBO |
| 1990-11-18 | 1991-06-22-Vacated | (United Kingdom) Chris Eubank | WBO |
| 1991-11-20 | 1992-Vacated | (United States) Gerald McClellan | WBO |
| 1993-05-19 | 1994-05-11 | (United Kingdom) Chris Pyatt | WBO |
| 1994-05-11 | 1995-03-Vacated | (Republic of Ireland) Steve Collins | WBO |
| 1995-05-19 | 1997-06-28-Vacated | (United States) Lonnie Bradley | WBO |
| 1997-12-13 | 1998-05-12-Vacated | (Canada) Otis Grant | WBO |
| 1999-01-30 | 1999-11-Stripped | (Germany) Bert Schenk | WBO |
| 1999-11 | 1999-11-27 | (United Kingdom) Jason Matthews | WBO |
| 1999-11-27 | 2002-04-06 | (Sweden) Armand Krajnc | WBO |
| 2002-04-06 | 2003-Retired | (Namibia) Harry Simon | WBO |
| 2003-05-10 | 2003-09-13 | (Argentina) Hector Javier Velazco | WBO |
| 2003-09-13 | 2004-06-05 | (Germany) Felix Sturm | WBO |
| 2004-06-05 | 2004-09-18 | (United States) Oscar De La Hoya | WBO |
| 2004-09-18 | 2005-07-16 | (United States) Bernard Hopkins | WBO |
| 2005-07-16 | 2007-09-29 | (United States) Jermain Taylor | WBO |
| 2007-09-29 | 2010-04-17 | (United States) Kelly Pavlik | WBO |
| 2010-04-17 | 2010-06-01-Stripped | (Argentina) Sergio Martínez | WBO |
| 2010-07-31 | 2012-08-25-Stripped | (Russia) Dmitry Pirog | WBO |
| 2012-08-25 | 2012-10-20 | (Cameroon) Hassan N'Dam N'Jikam | WBO |
| 2012-10-20 | 2014-09-04-Vacated | (United States) Peter Quillin | WBO |
| 2014-12-13 | 2015-12-19 | (Republic of Ireland) Andy Lee | WBO |
| 2015-12-19 | 2018-10-11 | (United Kingdom) Billy Joe Saunders | WBO |
| 2018-10-20 | 2022-08-30-Vacated | (United States) Demetrius Andrade | WBO |
| 2022-08-30 | 2026-07-20-Vacated | (Kazakhstan) Janibek Alimkhanuly | WBO |
| 2026-07-20 | Present | (United Kingdom) Denzel Bentley | WBO |

== See also ==
- List of Australian middleweight boxing champions
- List of British middleweight boxing champions
- List of British world boxing champions
- List of New Zealand middleweight boxing champions
- World Negro Middleweight Championship
- World Colored Middleweight Championship
