= Daniel James (boxer) =

Trinidad and Tobago boxer (1922–2006)

Daniel James, also known as Gentle Daniel, (December 26, 1922 – April 8, 2006) was a light-heavyweight boxer from Trinidad and Tobago. He spent time in Belmont Orphanage. He retired in 1953. He was Inducted into WITCO’s Trinidad & Tobago Sports Hall of Fame in 1985.

== Career ==
James defeated Venezuelan champion Jota Jota Hernandez, American Bert Lytell (boxer), fellow Trinidadian Ancil “Baba” Adams, and Jamaican champion Syd Brown (boxer), to win the Caribbean title. He lived in Belmont.

Against Yolande Pompey, he had a draw and held is title, and then two losses in 1950 and 1951.
