= Roy Cape =

Trinidadian calypso saxophonist (1942–2024)

Roy Francis Cape (18 April 1942 – 5 September 2024) was a Trinidadian calypso saxophonist who was active as a band musician for more than 50 years. He was featured on hundreds of recordings and has released eight albums with the Roy Cape All Stars.

Both of Cape's maternal grandparents came from Grenada. He never knew his father, who was a white American who came to Trinidad on business and left shortly after he was born. He grew up in poverty and lived with some neighbors. They sent him to the Sacred Heart Boys' School. Cape entered the Belmont Orphanage in 1953, where he received his first musical education.

In 1961, he went on his first Caribbean tour to Grenada and Antigua, playing alongside Sel Wheeler. His band attracted a large following at Bill Abbott's club in Antigua. The tour proved unprofitable and Cape worked as a barber in Barbados for a while afterwards. Eventually he moved back to Trinidad and was invited to join Frankie Francis's band. Cape said that he did not want to abandon his own nascent group, so Francis invited them all to join.

Cape joined Clarence Curvan's band after playing on a record and stayed with him until 1964. He formed his own band the following year and played at the Carnival in Barbados. As a young musician, Cape had trouble making ends meet and was not able to afford his own saxophone until years later. One of the highlights of his career according to him was performing with the Sparrows. Cape was a janitor for several years in New York, and worked in road construction when he moved back to Trinidad in the 1970s. Throughout his career, he has toured and recorded with calypso groups including The Mighty Sparrow, Lord Kitchener, The Mighty Chalkdust, Denyse Plummer, and Black Stalin.

The Roy Cape All Stars was formed in 1980. In 2017, the band changed its name to D'All Starz. Cape retired after the name change and focused his energy on the Roy Cape Foundation, whose goal is to bring hope through music education. The foundation supplies at-risk youth with instruments and supplies in preparation for a possible career in music.

Cape received an honorary degree from the University of the West Indies in 2011.

Cape died from a stroke on 5 September 2024, at the age of 82.
