= Les McAteer =

English boxer (born 1945)

Personal information
- Nationality: English
- Born: Leslie McAteer; 19 August 1945 (age 81) Birkenhead, England
- Weight: light middle/middle/light heavyweight

Boxing career

Boxing record
- Total fights: 39
- Wins: 27 (KO 12)
- Losses: 10 (KO 4)
- Draws: 2

Les McAteer (born 19 August 1945 in Birkenhead) is an English amateur and professional light middle/middle/light heavyweight boxer of the 1960s and '70s who as an amateur won the Amateur Boxing Association of England (ABAE) 1960 Schools Intermediate title, boxing out of Birkenhead, and won the Amateur Boxing Association of England (ABAE) 1962 Junior Class-B title against K. Kemp (West Ham Boys' Club), boxing out of Willaston Birkenhead ABC, and as a professional won the British Boxing Board of Control (BBBofC) Central Area middleweight title, BBBofC British middleweight title, and Commonwealth middleweight title, ( between 14 July 1969 - 12 May 1970) and was a challenger for the BBBofC British middleweight title, and British Commonwealth middleweight title against Johnny Pritchett, and European Boxing Union (EBU) middleweight title against Tom Bogs, his professional fighting weight varied from 153 3/4 lb (69.7 kg; 10 st 13.8 lb), i.e. light middleweight to 164 lb (74 kg; 11 st 10 lb), i.e. light heavyweight. Les McAteer as a professional was managed by Johnny Campbell (circa-1905 — 2 May 1994 (aged 89)).

== Genealogical information ==
Les McAteer is the younger brother of Brian McAteer (birth registered January→March 1937 (age 88–89) in Birkenhead district), Niel McAteer (birth registered January→March 1940 (age 85–86) in Birkenhead district), and the boxer Gordon McAteer (birth registered April→June 1942 (age 83–84) in Birkenhead district), the older brother of William McAteer (birth registered July→September 1950 (age 75–76) in Birkenhead district), and Patricia McAteer (birth registered October→December 1952 (age 73–74) in Birkenhead district), the cousin of the boxer Pat McAteer, and relative of association (soccer) footballer Jason McAteer.
