= Dick Tiger =

Nigerian world champion boxer (1929–1971)

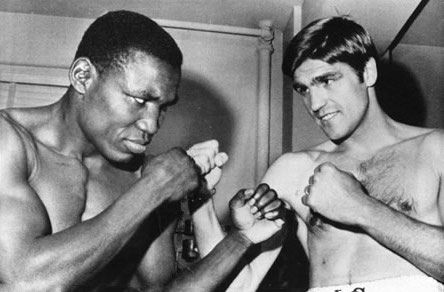
- Dick Tiger (left) with Nino Benvenuti in 1969

Personal information
- Nationality: Nigerian
- Born: Richard Ihetu; August 14, 1929 Amaigbo, Colonial Nigeria
- Died: December 14, 1971 (aged 42) Aba, Nigeria
- Height: 172 cm (5 ft 8 in)

Boxing career
- Weight class: Middleweight; Light Heavyweight
- Reach: 71 in (180 cm)
- Stance: Orthodox

Boxing record
- Total fights: 82
- Wins: 60
- Win by KO: 27
- Losses: 19
- Draws: 3

Richard Ihetu GCOI (August 14, 1929 – December 14, 1971), professionally known as Dick Tiger was a Nigerian professional boxer and former military officer of the Biafran army often regarded as one of the best boxers of the 20th century and one of the greatest boxers of his generation, Tiger held the undisputed middleweight and light-heavyweight championships making him the first African to do so. He is the first African to be inducted into the International Boxing Hall of Fame.

Tiger was born in Amaigbo in Imo State and later moved to Aba in 1946 at aged 17 where he began boxing while working as a market trader with his mother, he later emigrated to Liverpool, England to pursue his boxing career and later to the United States. In 1963, Tiger hosted the first-ever world boxing championship bout held on African soil at the Liberty Stadium in Ibadan, Nigeria which he won.

Tiger was Igbo and officially joined the Biafran Army in December 1967 after he publicly declared his allegiance to Biafra during a press conference in New Jersey in June 1968, he was officially commissioned as a Second Lieutenant in the morale corps of the Biafran Armed Forces primarily training soldiers in hand-to-hand combat. He was appointed a Member of the British Empire (MBE) by Queen Elizabeth II as Queen of Nigeria in 1963, but famously returned his insignia on May 15, 1968, to protest Britain's support and weapon supplies to Nigeria during the Nigerian-Biafran civil war.

Tiger was inducted into the International Boxing Hall of Fame in 1991. The Ring magazine named him Fighter of the Year in 1962 and 1965, while the Boxing Writers Association of America (BWAA) named him Fighter of the Year in 1962 and 1966. In 1996, Tiger was voted as one of the best boxers of the 1960s. Tiger was included in the 1998 book "Best Boxers of the 20th Century". In 2002, Tiger was voted by The Ring magazine as the 31st greatest fighter of the last 80 years. His first world title win in 1962 was ranked the 15th most memorable moment in Nigerian sports history since 1960 by Premium Times in 2020, the highest ranked combat sports-related moment.

== Professional career ==
Tiger became a two-time undisputed world middleweight champion and helped keep boxing alive during the 1950s boxing industry recession. Tiger won the WBA middleweight title when he beat Gene Fullmer on October 23, 1962, and the light heavyweight title in 1966 when he dethroned José Torres of Puerto Rico.

Prior to these accomplishments, however, Tiger seemed condemned to poor management and a resulting lack of exposure. In 1957, using Liverpool as his fighting base, Tiger was fighting on undercards for small purses, when by fortune, facing off against popular favorite Terry Downes at Shoreditch Town Hall, he walked away with a TKO after six heats. New management saw to it certain "errors in his style" were corrected, and in another year, Tiger had taken 17 of 19 fights and won the British Middleweight title. In 1959, handled by the independent Jersey Jones, Tiger came to America, to face adversity in a whole, new way. Jersey Jones, resisting the influences of Madison Square Garden, brokered deals for Tiger by himself, which in the short run, cost them both. In an independent promotion at Edmonton, Alberta, Tiger's Empire belt was lost in a more-than questionable 15 round nod to local challenger Wilf Greaves. The decision as rendered, had first been called a draw; appalled, Jones demanded a recount of the cards, which boomeranged, showing the fight, dominated by Tiger, as a win for Greaves. Tiger, sincere and honorable in his dealings, often found this virtuous approach not reciprocated, particularly in North America.

A. J. Liebling, impressed in witnessing Tiger's 1962 performance versus Henry Hank of Detroit, described the fighter's appearance thus: "[...] a chest like an old-fashioned black office safe, dropping away to a slender waist, big thighs, and slender legs; he boxed classically, his arms tight against his sides at the beginning of a punch, his savagely methodical blows moving in short arcs and straight lines."

Such a description was similarly evoked, albeit in simpler terms, by Tiger's contemporaries. Gene Fullmer: "Tiger was a rough guy [...] I went to Nigeria to fight him, and, of course, I don't know what happened over there [...] He beat me. He beat me bad. My mother and father could have been judge and referee, and I couldn't have won a round [...]" Joey Giardello: "I thank Dick Tiger because Dick Tiger was a man and Dick Tiger gave (a title shot) to me. He didn't have to give it to me. He could have give it to somebody else." Giardello and Tiger fought four times, with each bout going the full distance. They exchanged the middleweight title during their last two encounters. In total, they spent approximately two and a half hours in the ring together. Prior to one of their later fights, when asked whether he planned to trade punches with the hard-hitting Tiger, Giardello responded, "I wouldn't trade stamps with him."

Numerous accounts of Tiger, both as a person and a fighter, describe him as solid, disciplined, and principled. He generally avoided promotional theatrics, a contrast to Western marketing tactics of the time. In an effort to secure a title shot, contender Joey Archer, a technically skilled middleweight known for his speed, launched a small-scale advertising campaign aimed at Tiger. One ad stated, "I'm a middleweight, and I've licked every man I ever fought, including you," referencing a previous victory over Tiger. However, Tiger had already signed to defend his title against Emile Griffith, prompting another ad from Archer that read, "The Middleweight Champion should meet the best middleweight (not a welterweight)." Archer also promoted his campaign through television appearances and in the New York Daily News, and was even photographed taunting a caged tiger at the Bronx Zoo. Despite his efforts, Tiger went on to lose the middleweight title to Griffith, and a bout with Archer never materialized. Following the loss, Archer shifted focus elsewhere, and in 1966, Tiger moved up to campaign as a full-time light heavyweight.

After defeating José Torres by decision to win the light heavyweight title, Tiger successfully defended the crown against Torres in a rematch and against Montana native Roger Rouse. He then lost the title to Bob Foster of Albuquerque, New Mexico. Although Foster was sometimes described as a veteran, he was only 26 years old with 33 fights, while Tiger, nearly 40, was approaching the end of his career. The left hook Foster used to knock out Tiger was later ranked among "The 10 Deadliest Punches of the Last 25 Years" by Big Book of Boxing in 1975.

Due to the emphatic nature of the knockout, promoters at Madison Square Garden reportedly felt a rematch would not draw sufficient public interest. As a result, Tiger had to requalify for a title shot and was matched against rising contender Frankie DePaula, who had recorded five consecutive knockouts. Their bout was highly competitive, with both fighters being knocked down twice in the first four rounds. It was later named "Fight of the Year" by Ring magazine. Although Tiger won the decision, it was DePaula— despite the loss— who received the next title shot against Foster.

== Retirement and death ==
In the latter part of his career, Tiger traveled from his home in Nigeria to Liverpool, in northwestern England, and eventually to the United States, continuing to make a significant contribution to boxing.

After retiring, he worked as a security guard at the Metropolitan Museum of Art in New York City. One day, he experienced severe back pain and was later diagnosed with liver cancer.

Tiger had previously been banned by the Nigerian government due to his involvement with the Biafran movement. However, the ban was lifted after news of his illness reached Nigeria. He died of liver cancer on 14 December 1971 in Aba, Nigeria, at the age of 42.

== Professional boxing record ==
82 fights	60 wins	19 losses
By knockout	27	2
By decision	33	17
Draws	3	

No.	Result	Record	Opponent	Type	Round, time	Date	Location	Notes
82	Loss	60–19–3	Emile Griffith	UD	10	Jul 15, 1970	Madison Square Garden, New York City, New York, U.S.	
81	Win	60–18–3	Andy Kendall	UD	10	Nov 14, 1969	Madison Square Garden, New York City, New York, U.S.	
80	Win	59–18–3	Nino Benvenuti	UD	10	May 26, 1969	Madison Square Garden, New York City, New York, U.S.	
79	Win	58–18–3	Frank DePaula	UD	10	Oct 25, 1968	Madison Square Garden, New York City, New York, U.S.	
78	Loss	57–18–3	Bob Foster	KO	4 (15), 2:05	May 24, 1968	Madison Square Garden, New York City, New York, U.S.	Lost WBA, WBC, and The Ring light-heavyweight titles
77	Win	57–17–3	Roger Rouse	TKO	12 (15), 0:12	Nov 17, 1967	Las Vegas Convention Center, Winchester, Nevada, U.S.	Retained WBA, WBC, and The Ring light-heavyweight titles
76	Win	56–17–3	José Torres	SD	15	May 16, 1967	Madison Square Garden, New York City, New York, U.S.	Retained WBA, WBC, and The Ring light-heavyweight titles
75	Win	55–17–3	Abraham Tomica	TKO	5 (10)	Feb 5, 1967	Mile One Park, Port Harcourt, Nigeria	
74	Win	54–17–3	José Torres	UD	15	Dec 16, 1966	Madison Square Garden, New York City, New York, U.S.	Won WBA, WBC, and The Ring light-heavyweight titles
73	Loss	53–17–3	Emile Griffith	UD	15	Apr 25, 1966	Madison Square Garden, New York City, New York, U.S.	Lost WBA, WBC, and The Ring middleweight titles
72	Win	53–16–3	Peter Mueller	KO	3 (10), 0:57	Feb 18, 1966	Westfalenhalle, Dortmund, Germany	
71	Win	52–16–3	Joey Giardello	UD	15	Oct 21, 1965	Madison Square Garden, New York City, New York, U.S.	Won WBA, WBC, and The Ring middleweight titles
70	Win	51–16–3	Rubin Carter	UD	10	May 20, 1965	Madison Square Garden, New York City, New York, U.S.	
69	Win	50–16–3	Juan Carlos Rivero	TKO	6 (10)	Mar 12, 1965	Madison Square Garden, New York City, New York, U.S.	
68	Loss	49–16–3	Joey Archer	SD	10	Oct 16, 1964	Madison Square Garden, New York City, New York, U.S.	
67	Win	49–15–3	Don Fullmer	UD	10	Sep 11, 1964	Arena, Cleveland, Ohio, U.S.	
66	Win	48–15–3	Jose Monon Gonzalez	TKO	6 (10)	Jul 31, 1964	Madison Square Garden, New York City, New York, U.S.	
65	Loss	47–15–3	Joey Giardello	PTS	15	Dec 7, 1963	Convention Hall, Atlantic City, New Jersey, U.S.	Lost WBA, WBC, and The Ring middleweight titles
64	Win	47–14–3	Gene Fullmer	RTD	7 (15), 3:00	Aug 10, 1963	Liberty Stadium, Ibadan, Nigeria	Retained WBA and The Ring middleweight titles; Won inaugural WBC middleweight title
63	Draw	46–14–3	Gene Fullmer	SD	15	Feb 23, 1963	Las Vegas Convention Center, Winchester, Nevada, U.S.	Retained NYSAC and WBA middleweight title
62	Win	46–14–2	Gene Fullmer	UD	15	Oct 23, 1962	Candlestick Park, San Francisco, California, U.S.	Won WBA middleweight title
61	Win	45–14–2	Henry Hank	UD	10	Mar 31, 1962	Madison Square Garden, New York City, New York, U.S.	
60	Win	44–14–2	Florentino Fernández	TKO	6 (10)	Jan 20, 1962	Convention Center, Miami Beach, Florida, U.S.	
59	Win	43–14–2	William Pickett	UD	10	Dec 16, 1961	Madison Square Garden, New York City, New York, U.S.	
58	Win	42–14–2	Hank Casey	SD	10	May 15, 1961	Municipal Auditorium, New Orleans, Louisiana, U.S.	
57	Win	41–14–2	Ellsworth Webb	KO	6 (10), 2:41	Apr 15, 1961	St. Nicholas Arena, New York City, New York, U.S.	
56	Win	40–14–2	Gene Armstrong	TKO	9 (10), 1:21	Feb 18, 1961	Madison Square Garden, New York City, New York, U.S.	
55	Win	39–14–2	Wilf Greaves	TKO	9 (15), 1:20	Nov 30, 1960	Edmonton Gardens, Edmonton, Canada	Won Commonwealth middleweight title
54	Loss	38–14–2	Wilf Greaves	SD	15	Jun 22, 1960	Edmonton Gardens, Edmonton, Canada	Lost Commonwealth middleweight title
53	Win	38–13–2	Víctor Zalazar	MD	10	Apr 1, 1960	Arena, Boston, Massachusetts, U.S.	
52	Win	37–13–2	Gene Armstrong	UD	10	Feb 24, 1960	Chicago Stadium, Chicago, Illinois, U.S.	
51	Win	36–13–2	Holly Mims	MD	10	Dec 30, 1959	Chicago Stadium, Chicago, Illinois, U.S.	
50	Loss	35–13–2	Joey Giardello	UD	10	Nov 4, 1959	Arena, Cleveland, Ohio, U.S.	
49	Win	35–12–2	Joey Giardello	UD	10	Sep 30, 1959	Chicago Stadium, Chicago, Illinois, U.S.	
48	Win	34–12–2	Gene Armstrong	PTS	10	Sep 2, 1959	Convention Hall, Camden, New Jersey, U.S.	
47	Loss	33–12–2	Rory Calhoun	SD	10	Jul 17, 1959	War Memorial Auditorium, Syracuse, New York, U.S.	
46	Draw	33–11–2	Rory Calhoun	PTS	10	Jun 5, 1959	Madison Square Garden, New York City, New York, U.S.	
45	Win	33–11–1	Randy Sandy	PTS	10	May 12, 1959	Empire Pool, Wembley, England	
44	Loss	32–11–1	Randy Sandy	PTS	10	March 19, 1959	The Stadium, Liverpool, England	
43	Win	32–10–1	Yolande Pompey	PTS	10	Oct 14, 1958	Empire Pool, London, England	
42	Loss	31–10–1	Ellsworth Webb	PTS	10	Jun 24, 1958	Earls Court Empress Hall, London, England	
41	Win	31–9–1	Billy Ellaway	KO	2 (8)	May 1, 1958	The Stadium, Liverpool, England	
40	Win	30–9–1	Pat McAteer	KO	9 (15)	Mar 27, 1958	The Stadium, Liverpool, England	Won Commonwealth middleweight title
39	Win	29–9–1	Johnny Read	KO	6 (8)	Feb 25, 1958	Harringay Arena, London, England	
38	Win	28–9–1	Jimmy Lynas	KO	7 (8)	Feb 3, 1958	King's Hall, Manchester, England	
37	Win	27–9–1	Jean Ruellet	PTA	8	Jan 13, 1958	City Hall, Hull, England	
36	Win	26–9–1	Paddy Delargy	KO	6 (10)	Nov 28, 1957	Embassy Sportsdrome, Birmingham, England	
35	Draw	25–9–1	Pat McAteer	PTS	10	Nov 11, 1957	Sophia Gardens Pavilion, Cardiff, Wales	
34	Win	25–9	Jean Claude Poisson	PTS	10	Oct 21, 1957	Sophia Gardens Pavilion, Cardiff, Wales	
33	Win	24–9	Phil Edwards	PTS	10	Sep 9, 1957	Sophia Gardens Pavilion, Cardiff, Wales	
32	Win	23–9	Alan Dean	PTS	8	Jun 25, 1957	The Stadium, Liverpool, England	
31	Loss	22–9	Willie Armstrong	PTS	8	Jul 15, 1957	Engineer's Club, Hartlepool, England	
30	Win	22–8	Marius Dori	TKO	7 (8)	Jun 4, 1957	Harringay Arena, London, England	
29	Win	21–8	Terry Downes	TKO	5 (8)	May 14, 1957	Town Hall, London, England	
28	Win	20–8	Johnny Read	TKO	2 (8)	Apr 29, 1957	National Sporting Club, London, England	
27	Win	19–8	Alan Dean	PTS	8	Nov 9, 1956	Tower Circus, Blackpool, England	
26	Loss	18–8	Alan Dean	PTS	6	Oct 18, 1956	The Stadium, Liverpool, England	
25	Win	18–7	Jimmy Lynas	PTS	8	Jul 2, 1956	Tower Circus, Blackpool, England	
24	Win	17–7	Wally Scott	TKO	4 (8)	May 28, 1956	Engineer's Club, Hartlepool, England	
23	Win	16–7	Alan Dean	PTS	8	May 10, 1956	The Stadium, Liverpool, England	
22	Win	15–7	Dennis Rowley	KO	1 (8)	May 3, 1956	The Stadium, Liverpool, England	
21	Loss	14–7	George Roe	PTS	8	Mar 22, 1956	The Stadium, Liverpool, England	
20	Loss	14–6	Jimmy Lynas	PTS	8	Mar 1, 1956	Tower Circus, Blackpool, England	
19	Loss	14–5	Gerry McNally	PTS	8	Jan 27, 1956	Tower Circus, Blackpool, England	
18	Loss	14–4	Alan Dean	PTS	6	Dec 08, 1955	The Stadium, Liverpool, England	
17	Win	14–3	Bolaji Johnson	PTS	8	Aug 31, 1955	Glover Memorial Hall, Lagos, Nigeria	
16	Win	13–3	John Ama	KO	2	May 1, 1955	Lagos, Nigeria	
15	Win	12–3	Raheem Fagbemi	PTS	8	Jan 31, 1955	Glover Memorial Hall, Lagos, Nigeria	
14	Win	11–3	Koko Kid	KO	6	Jan 1, 1955	Amaigbo, Nigeria	
13	Win	10–3	Peter Okptra	KO	8	Nov 1, 1954	Lagos, Nigeria	
12	Win	9–3	Super Human Power	PTS	8	Jul 18, 1954	Rex Cinema Hall, Aba, Nigeria	
11	Win	8–3	Mighty Joe	PTS	6	Jun 12, 1954	Rex Cinema Hall, Aba, Nigeria	
10	Win	7–3	Robert Nwanne	KO	2	Feb 1, 1954	Lagos, Nigeria	
9	Loss	6–3	Tommy West	PTS	6	Jan 29, 1954	Glover Memorial Hall, Lagos, Nigeria	
8	Loss	6–2	Tommy West	RTD	7	May 20, 1953	African Tennis Club, Lagos, Nigeria	
7	Win	6–1	Simon Eme	PTS	8	Feb 1, 1953	Lagos, Nigeria	
6	Win	5–1	Blackie Power	PTS	6	Jan 30, 1953	Glover Memorial Hall, Lagos, Nigeria	
5	Win	4–1	Lion Ring	TKO	6	Jan 1, 1953	Lagos	
4	Loss	3–1	Tommy West	PTS	10	Dec 13, 1952	Rex Cinema Hall, Lagos, Nigeria	
3	Win	3–0	Easy Dynamite	KO	1	Oct 1, 1952	Port Harcourt, Nigeria	
2	Win	2–0	Koko Kid	PTS	8	Sep 1, 1952	Port Harcourt, Nigeria	
1	Win	1–0	Simon Eme	KO	2	Jan 1, 1952	Aba, Nigeria	

== Titles in boxing ==
=== Major world titles ===
- NYSAC middleweight champion (160 lbs)
- WBA middleweight champion (160 lbs) (2×)
- WBC middleweight champion (Note: Won Inaugural title after defeating Gene Fullmer on August 10, 1963.) (160 lbs) (2×)
- WBA light heavyweight champion (175 lbs)
- WBC light heavyweight champion (175 lbs)

=== The Ring magazine titles ===
- The Ring middleweight champion (160 lbs) (2×)
- The Ring light heavyweight champion (175 lbs)

=== Regional/International titles ===
- Commonwealth middleweight champion (160 lbs) (2×)

=== Undisputed titles ===
- Undisputed middleweight champion (2×)
- Undisputed light heavyweight champion

== Portrayals ==
=== Fiction ===
- A fictional August 29, 1963 Madison Square Garden bout in which a heavily favored Dick Tiger loses to (the fictive) Tom "The Hammer" Case of Dallas, Texas comes near the end of Stephen King's time-travel novel, 11/22/63.

=== Television ===
- He appeared as the first guest on the June 16, 1963 installment of the American television series What's My Line? He signed in with his actual name, and his occupation was correctly guessed by second panelist Tony Randall.

== See also ==
- List of middleweight boxing champions
- List of light-heavyweight boxing champions

== Notes and references ==
=== References ===
Sporting positions
World boxing titles
Vacant Title last held by Paul Pender	NYSAC middleweight champion November 9, 1962 - August 10, 1963; Won inaugural WBC title	Title discontinued
Preceded by Gene Fullmer	WBA middleweight champion October 23, 1962 - December 7, 1963	Succeeded by Joey Giardello
Inaugural Champion	WBC middleweight champion August 10, 1963 - December 7, 1963	Succeeded by Joey Giardello
Vacant Title last held by Paul Pender	The Ring middleweight champion May 7, 1963 - December 7, 1963	Succeeded by Joey Giardello
Vacant Title last held by Sugar Ray Robinson	Undisputed middleweight champion November 9, 1962 - December 7, 1963	Succeeded by Joey Giardello
Preceded by Joey Giardello	WBA middleweight champion October 21, 1965 - April 25, 1966	Succeeded by Emile Griffith
Preceded by Joey Giardello	WBC middleweight champion October 21, 1965 - April 25, 1966	Succeeded by Emile Griffith
Preceded by Joey Giardello	The Ring middleweight champion October 21, 1965 - April 25, 1966	Succeeded by Emile Griffith
Preceded by Joey Giardello	Undisputed middleweight champion October 21, 1965 - April 25, 1966	Succeeded by Emile Griffith
Preceded by José Torres	WBA light-heavyweight champion December 16, 1966 - May 24, 1968	Succeeded by Bob Foster
Preceded by José Torres	WBC light-heavyweight champion December 16, 1966 - May 24, 1968	Succeeded by Bob Foster
Preceded by José Torres	The Ring light-heavyweight champion December 16, 1966 - May 24, 1968	Succeeded by Bob Foster
Preceded by José Torres	Undisputed light-heavyweight champion December 16, 1966 - May 24, 1968	Succeeded by Bob Foster
Middleweight status
Preceded by Randolph Turpin	Latest born world champion to die December 15, 1971 – January 8, 1995	Succeeded by Carlos Monzón
Light heavyweight status
Preceded by Freddie Mills	Latest born world champion to die December 15, 1971 – October 25, 1980	Succeeded by Víctor Galíndez
