= Terry Downes =

British boxer and actor (1936–2017)

Terry Downes BEM

Personal information
- Nickname: Paddington Express
- Nationality: British
- Born: 9 May 1936 Paddington, London, England
- Died: 6 October 2017 (aged 81) London, England
- Height: 5 ft 9 in (175 cm)
- Weight: Middleweight, light heavyweight

Boxing career
- Reach: 69 in (175 cm)
- Stance: Orthodox

Boxing record
- Total fights: 44
- Wins: 35
- Win by KO: 28
- Losses: 9
- Draws: 0

Terry Downes, BEM (9 May 1936 – 6 October 2017) was a British middleweight boxer, occasional film actor, and businessman. He was nicknamed the "Paddington Express" for his aggressive fighting style.

At the time of his death, Downes was Britain's oldest surviving former world champion. He held the world middleweight title (the version recognised by Europe, New York, and Massachusetts) for ten months from 1961-62.

== Early life ==
Terry Downes was born in Paddington, London. His father Richard worked as a mechanic, and his mother Hilda in a department store. Downes boxed as a junior for the Fisher ABC.

He moved with his parents to the United States in 1952, while still a teenager, to live with his trapeze artist sister Sylvia, who had lost an arm in a traffic accident, going on to serve in the US Marine Corps from 1954–56, being recruited after boxing against them for the YMCA. In the Marines he won several amateur trophies, including the all-services championship and the Amateur Golden Gloves.

He missed out on selection for the US Olympic team, being ruled ineligible on residence grounds, and after his term of service, he returned to London and turned professional.

== Professional boxing career ==
Managed by Sam Burns, Downes won his first two pro fights before a defeat by future world champion Dick Tiger. After building up a record of 16 wins and 3 defeats, Downes won the British middleweight title, vacated by Pat McAteer's retirement, by beating Phil Edwards on 30 September 1958 at the Harringay Arena, London. In 1959, Downes lost and won back the title from John "Cowboy" McCormack. On 5 July 1960, Downes successfully defended the title against Edwards again.

Downes lost his first World Title shot to Paul Pender in Boston in January 1961. The following July, however, Downes fought Pender again, this time in London, and defeated the American in front of a raucous Wembley crowd, with Pender retiring at the end of the ninth round with cuts over both eyes. Downes was recognised as world champion by The Ring magazine in August 1961, and was named Sports Writers' Association Sportsman of the Year later that year. Pender won the title back the following year, defeating Downes in Boston once more, this time on points.

Downes responded to the loss of his title by winning his next seven bouts, including a win over Sugar Ray Robinson in September 1962. Robinson was, however, 41 at the time, and when asked after the fight how it felt to beat a boxer of such esteem, Downes famously replied, "I didn't beat Sugar Ray, I beat his ghost." Downes moved up to light heavyweight in 1963, winning his first three fights at the weight before facing Willie Pastrano for the world title in Manchester on 30 November 1964. Downes was knocked down twice in the 11th round, while reportedly well ahead on points, and Pastrano retained his title when referee Andrew Smyth controversially waved it off – it was to be Downes' last fight.

Downes was famous for a number of quips. After a particularly brutal fight early in his career against Dick Tiger, Downes was asked who he wanted to fight next. He replied, "The bastard who made this match", in reference to Mickey Duff.

Downes fought six world champions and beat three: Robinson, Pender and Joey Giardello. His record was: 44 fights, 35 wins (28 KOs), 9 losses.

== Acting career ==
Post-boxing, Downes acted occasionally between 1965 and 1990, usually appearing as a thug, villain or bodyguard. One of his more prominent roles was in Roman Polanski's 1967 film The Fearless Vampire Killers, in which he played "Koukol", a hunchbacked servant. His other film credits included appearances in A Study in Terror (1965), Five Ashore in Singapore (1967), The Golden Lady (1979), If You Go Down in the Woods Today (1981), and the Derek Jarman film Caravaggio (1986).

=== Films ===
- A Study in Terror (1965) - Chunky
- The Fearless Vampire Killers (1967) - Koukol, the Servant
- Five Ashore in Singapore (1967) - Sgt. Gruber
- The Golden Lady (1979) - Trainer
- If You Go Down in the Woods Today (1981) - Woodsman
- Caravaggio (1986) - Bodyguard

== Other business interests ==
After his retirement, Downes owned a nightclub. and worked as a boxing manager, working with British title challenger Colin Lake in the late 1960s. In 1964, with his manager Sam Burns, he opened a chain of betting shops. The company, Burns & Downes Ltd., is currently owned by the William Hill Group, and listed with Companies House as inactive.

== Personal life ==
Downes and his wife Barbara (nee Clarke) were married from 1958 until his death in 2017. They had four children and eight grandchildren, one of whom includes prominent football writer and comedian James McNicholas. They lived for many years in a large detached house in Milespit Hill, Mill Hill, London NW7.

Downes was awarded the British Empire Medal in the 2012 Birthday Honours, in recognition of his sporting achievements and charity work. He died on 6 October 2017, aged 81.

== Professional boxing record ==
| 44 fights | 35 wins | 9 losses |
|---|---|---|
| By knockout | 28 | 6 |
| By decision | 7 | 2 |
| By disqualification | 0 | 1 |

| No. | Result | Record | Opponent | Type | Round | Date | Location | Notes |
|---|---|---|---|---|---|---|---|---|
| 44 | Loss | 35–9 | Willie Pastrano | TKO | 11 (15) | Nov 30, 1964 | King's Hall, Belle Vue, Manchester, Lancashire, England, U.K. | For WBA, WBC, and The Ring light heavyweight titles |
| 43 | Win | 35–8 | Ed Zaremba | PTS | 10 | May 28, 1964 | Kelvin Hall, Glasgow, Scotland, U.K. | |
| 42 | Win | 34–8 | Mike Pusateri | TKO | 5 (10) | Nov 25, 1963 | King's Hall, Belle Vue, Manchester, Lancashire, England, U.K. | |
| 41 | Win | 33–8 | Rudolf Nehring | KO | 3 (10) | Oct 8, 1963 | Royal Albert Hall, Kensington, London, England, U.K. | |
| 40 | Win | 32–8 | Jimmy Beecham | TKO | 9 (10) | Mar 5, 1963 | Seymour Hall, Marylebone, London, England, U.K. | |
| 39 | Win | 31–8 | Phil Moyer | TKO | 9 (10) | Nov 13, 1963 | Empire Pool, Wembley, London, England, U.K. | |
| 38 | Win | 30–8 | Sugar Ray Robinson | PTS | 10 | Sep 25, 1962 | Empire Pool, Wembley, London, England, U.K. | |
| 37 | Win | 29–8 | Don Fullmer | PTS | 10 | May 22, 1962 | Empire Pool, Wembley, London, England, U.K. | |
| 36 | Loss | 28–8 | Paul Pender | UD | 15 | Apr 7, 1962 | Arena, Boston, Massachusetts, U.S. | Lost NYSAC and The Ring middleweight titles |
| 35 | Win | 28–7 | Paul Pender | RTD | 9 (15) | Jul 11, 1961 | Empire Pool, Wembley, London, England, U.K. | Won NYSAC and The Ring middleweight titles |
| 34 | Win | 27–7 | Tony Montano | RTD | 5 (10) | May 2, 1961 | Empire Pool, Wembley, London, England, U.K. | |
| 33 | Win | 26–7 | Willie Greene | TKO | 3 (10) | Mar 7, 1961 | Empire Pool, Wembley, London, England, U.K. | |
| 32 | Loss | 25–7 | Paul Pender | TKO | 7 (15) | Jan 14, 1961 | Arena, Boston, Massachusetts, U.S. | For NYSAC and The Ring middleweight titles |
| 31 | Win | 25–6 | Joey Giardello | PTS | 10 | Oct 11, 1960 | Empire Pool, Wembley, London, England, U.K. | |
| 30 | Win | 24–6 | Phil Edwards | RTD | 12 (15) | Jul 5, 1960 | Empire Pool, Wembley, London, England, U.K. | Retained BBBofC British and Commonwealth middleweight titles |
| 29 | Win | 23–6 | Richard Bouchez | KO | 2 (10) | Jun 9, 1960 | King's Hall, Belle Vue, Manchester, Lancashire, England, U.K. | |
| 28 | Win | 22–6 | Orlando DePietro | KO | 4 (10) | Mar 24, 1960 | The Stadium, Liverpool, Merseyside, England, U.K. | |
| 27 | Win | 21–6 | Carlos Vanneste | TKO | 4 (10) | Mar 8, 1960 | Empire Pool, Wembley, London, England, U.K. | |
| 26 | Win | 20–6 | John McCormack | TKO | 8 (15) | Nov 3, 1959 | Empire Pool, Wembley, London, England, U.K. | Won BBBofC British and Commonwealth middleweight titles |
| 25 | Loss | 19–6 | John McCormack | DQ | 8 (15) | Sep 15, 1959 | Empire Pool, Wembley, London, England, U.K. | Lost BBBofC British middleweight title; For vacant Commonwealth middleweight title |
| 24 | Win | 19–5 | Andre Davier | KO | 7 (10) | Jul 7, 1959 | Streatham Ice Rink, Streatham, London, England, U.K. | |
| 23 | Loss | 18–5 | Michel Diouf | TKO | 5 (10) | Feb 24, 1959 | Wembley Stadium, Wembley, London, England, U.K. | |
| 22 | Loss | 18–4 | Ellsworth Webb | TKO | 8 (10) | Dec 9, 1958 | Empire Pool, Wembley, London, England, U.K. | |
| 21 | Win | 18–3 | Mohammed Ben Taibi | KO | 3 (10) | Nov 4, 1958 | Harringay Arena, Harringay, London, England, U.K. | |
| 20 | Win | 17–3 | Phil Edwards | TKO | 13 (15) | Sep 30, 1958 | Harringay Arena, Harringay, London, England, U.K. | Won vacant BBBofC British middleweight title |
| 19 | Win | 16–3 | Constant Alcantara | TKO | 3 (10) | Jul 15, 1958 | Streatham Ice Rink, Streatham, London, England, U.K. | |
| 18 | Win | 15–3 | Pat McAteer | PTS | 8 | Jun 3, 1958 | White City Stadium, White City, London, England, U.K. | |
| 17 | Win | 14–3 | Tuzo Portuguez | PTS | 8 | Apr 15, 1958 | Harringay Arena, Harringay, London, England, U.K. | |
| 16 | Win | 13–3 | Salah Ben Fahrat | TKO | 4 (8) | Mar 17, 1958 | Leyton Baths, Leyton, London, England, U.K. | |
| 15 | Win | 12–3 | Dennis Booty | TKO | 3 (8) | Feb 25, 1958 | Harringay Arena, Harringay, London, England, U.K. | |
| 14 | Loss | 11–3 | Freddie Cross | TKO | 6 (10) | Jan 28, 1958 | Harringay Arena, Harringay, London, England, U.K. | |
| 13 | Win | 11–2 | Serge Leveque | TKO | 4 (8) | Jan 7, 1958 | Town Hall, Shoreditch, London, England, U.K. | |
| 12 | Win | 10–2 | Hamouda Bouraoui | RTD | 4 (8) | Dec 19, 1957 | Town Hall, Shoreditch, London, England, U.K. | |
| 11 | Win | 9–2 | George Lavery | KO | 5 (8) | Dec 10, 1957 | Harringay Arena, Harringay, London, England, U.K. | |
| 10 | Loss | 8–2 | Les Allen | PTS | 8 | Nov 19, 1957 | Earls Court Empress Hall, Kensington, London, England, U.K. | |
| 9 | Win | 8–1 | Eddie Phillips | TKO | 3 (8) | Oct 28, 1957 | Leyton Baths, Leyton, London, England, U.K. | |
| 8 | Win | 7–1 | Derek Liversidge | TKO | 2 (8) | Oct 1, 1957 | Shoreditch Town Hall, Shoreditch, London, England, U.K. | |
| 7 | Win | 6–1 | Lew Lazar | PTS | 8 | Sep 17, 1957 | Harringay Arena, Harringay, London, England, U.K. | |
| 6 | Win | 5–1 | John Woolard | TKO | 7 (8) | Jun 25, 1957 | Town Hall, Shoreditch, London, England, U.K. | |
| 5 | Win | 4–1 | Sammy Hamilton | TKO | 3 (8) | Jun 18, 1957 | Streatham Ice Rink, Streatham, London, England, U.K. | |
| 4 | Win | 3–1 | Alan Dean | TKO | 4 (8) | Jun 4, 1957 | Harringay Arena, Harringay, London, England, U.K. | |
| 3 | Loss | 2–1 | Dick Tiger | TKO | 5 (8) | May 14, 1957 | Town Hall, Shoreditch, London, England, U.K. | |
| 2 | Win | 2–0 | Jimmy Lynas | TKO | 3 (6) | Apr 30, 1957 | Manor Place Baths, Walworth, London, England, U.K. | |
| 1 | Win | 1–0 | Peter Longo | KO | 1 (6) | Apr 9, 1957 | Harringay Arena, Harringay, London, England, U.K. | |

== See also ==
- List of middleweight boxing champions
- List of British middleweight boxing champions

Achievements
| Preceded by Paul Pender | World Middleweight Champion; 11 July 1961 – 7 April 1962 | Succeeded by Paul Pender |
Sporting positions
| Previous: Peter Kane | Oldest Living British World Champion; 23 July 1991 – 6 October 2017 | Next: Ken Buchanan |
| Previous: Jake LaMotta | Oldest Living Middleweight Champion; 19 September 2017 – 6 October 2017 | Next: Nino Benvenuti |
