= Frankie DePaula =

American boxer

Personal information
- Nickname: The Jersey Jolter
- Nationality: USA
- Born: July 4, 1939 Jersey City, New Jersey
- Died: September 14, 1970 (aged 31) Jersey City Medical Center
- Weight: Lightheavyweight

Boxing career
- Stance: Orthodox

Boxing record
- Total fights: 30
- Wins: 20
- Win by KO: 17
- Losses: 7
- Draws: 3

Frankie DePaula (July 4, 1939 – September 14, 1970) was a boxer from Jersey City, New Jersey.

== Early life ==
DePaula was born on July 4, 1939, in Jersey City, N.J. to Basil and Virginia DePaula. He attended St. Aloysius's Roman Catholic Grammar School on West Side Ave. in Jersey City. DePaula was born and raised on Duncan Avenue in Jersey City along with his family.

== Amateur boxing career ==
After his release from prison, DePaula, who had boxed while incarcerated, began training as an amateur at the Police Athletic League gym in Bayonne. He won the Novice 175 lb New York Golden Gloves title in 1962.

== Professional boxing career ==
DePaula made his professional boxing debut on April 27, 1962, at the Gladiator Arena in Totowa, New Jersey, winning by third-round knockout over Bill McKeever. His career was interrupted by a spell in prison which led to the withdrawal of his boxing license. There are no recorded bouts for the years 1964 and 1965 on his record. He returned to the ring in September 1966. In May 1967, Anthony 'Gary' Garafola, an ex-professional fighter, took over as his manager after the death of Patty Amato. DePaula lost to Charlie 'The Devil' Green by a second round stoppage in September 1967 but a winning streak of five bouts including knockouts over Juan 'Rocky' Rivero and Jimmy McDermott earned him a fight against Dick Tiger a former world middleweight and light heavyweight champion.

=== Fight with Dick Tiger ===
On October 25, 1968, DePaula met ex-Light Heavyweight champion and ex-Middleweight champion Dick Tiger. It was a non-title bout at Madison Square Garden. In an exciting brawl, each fighter knocked the other to the canvas on two occasions. The fight was a victory for Dick by unanimous decision. The bout was later awarded the Ring Magazine's 'Fight of the Year' for 1968.

=== Fight with Bob Foster ===
Although DePaula's bout with Dick Tiger had been announced as being an eliminator for the world light heavyweight title, his drawing power ensured that the matchmakers at Madison Square Garden elected that he go on to fight the champion, Bob Foster.

After knocking down Foster moments into their match (Foster claimed he was pushed, but the referee ruled it an official knockdown); the fight was awarded to Foster in accordance to New York State boxing rules after DePaula was sent to the canvas for a third time in the first of a scheduled 15 round contest.

== Arrest and legal troubles ==
In May 1969, DePaula was arrested by federal agents along with a group including Gary Garafola, Maxim Griesler, Henry Marler, Paul Evans, John Gardner, John DiMayo and Richard Brunell (Brunell later became a government witness against the other defendants) and charged with conspiracy, theft and possession of stolen copper. The offences were alleged to have taken place in March 1968. A few days later, his licence was suspended by the New York State Athletic Commission. He was also subpoenaed by the New York District Attorney's Office to appear before a grand jury investigating corruption in the boxing industry. On December 16, 1969, DePaula was indicted for perjury in regard to one of the responses he had given to prosecutors at the grand jury hearings earlier in the year. His co-indictees; James 'Jimmy Nap' Napoli and Joseph Calabro were suspected by an F.B.I. and N.Y.P.D. task force of having fixed DePaula's bout with Bob Foster.

DePaula's trial in regard to the copper heist began on April 14, 1970, at the Federal Criminal Court in Newark, New Jersey. On May 7, the jury acquitted him of charges of possession and theft, but failed to reach a verdict on the charge of conspiracy.

== Shooting and death ==
In the early hours of the morning of May 14, 1970, DePaula, in the company of Sharon Elwell, his 18-year-old girlfriend, was dropped off in front of Elwell's apartment situated on Harrison Avenue in Jersey City, New Jersey. They found a note stuck on the front entrance which informed them that the door was not working and to use the back entrance. DePaula was shot as he made his way through an adjoining alley. He was taken to the Jersey City Medical Center where he developed paralysis. He died four months later.

== Trial of suspects ==
The trial of DePaula's alleged assailants, Garafola and Richard 'Ricky' Phelan was held at the Municipal Court Building in Jersey City between February and March 1971. Both were acquitted of all charges.
