= Ellsworth Webb =

American boxer (1931–2017)

Personal information
- Born: November 20, 1931 Tulsa, Oklahoma, United States
- Died: November 23, 2017 (aged 86) Tulsa, Oklahoma, United States

Sport
- Sport: Boxing

Ellsworth Webb (November 20, 1931 – November 23, 2017) was an American boxer. He competed in the men's light middleweight event at the 1952 Summer Olympics.

== Professional boxing career ==
Ellsworth, nicknamed "Spider", was a top ranked middleweight contender who fought for the World Boxing Association's (then known as National Boxing Association) version of the world Middleweight title on December 4, 1959, losing by unanimous fifteen-round decision to Gene Fullmer in Logan, Utah. He also lost to Dick Tiger but had notable wins over Tiger, Joey GiardelloTerry Downes, Rory Calhoun, Randy Sandy, Holly Mims and Pat McAteer, among others.

Webb had 34 wins and 6 losses in 40 professional boxing matches, with 19 wins and 1 loss (in his last fight, against Tiger) by knockout.
