= Yolande Pompey =

Trinidad and Tobago boxer (1929–1979)

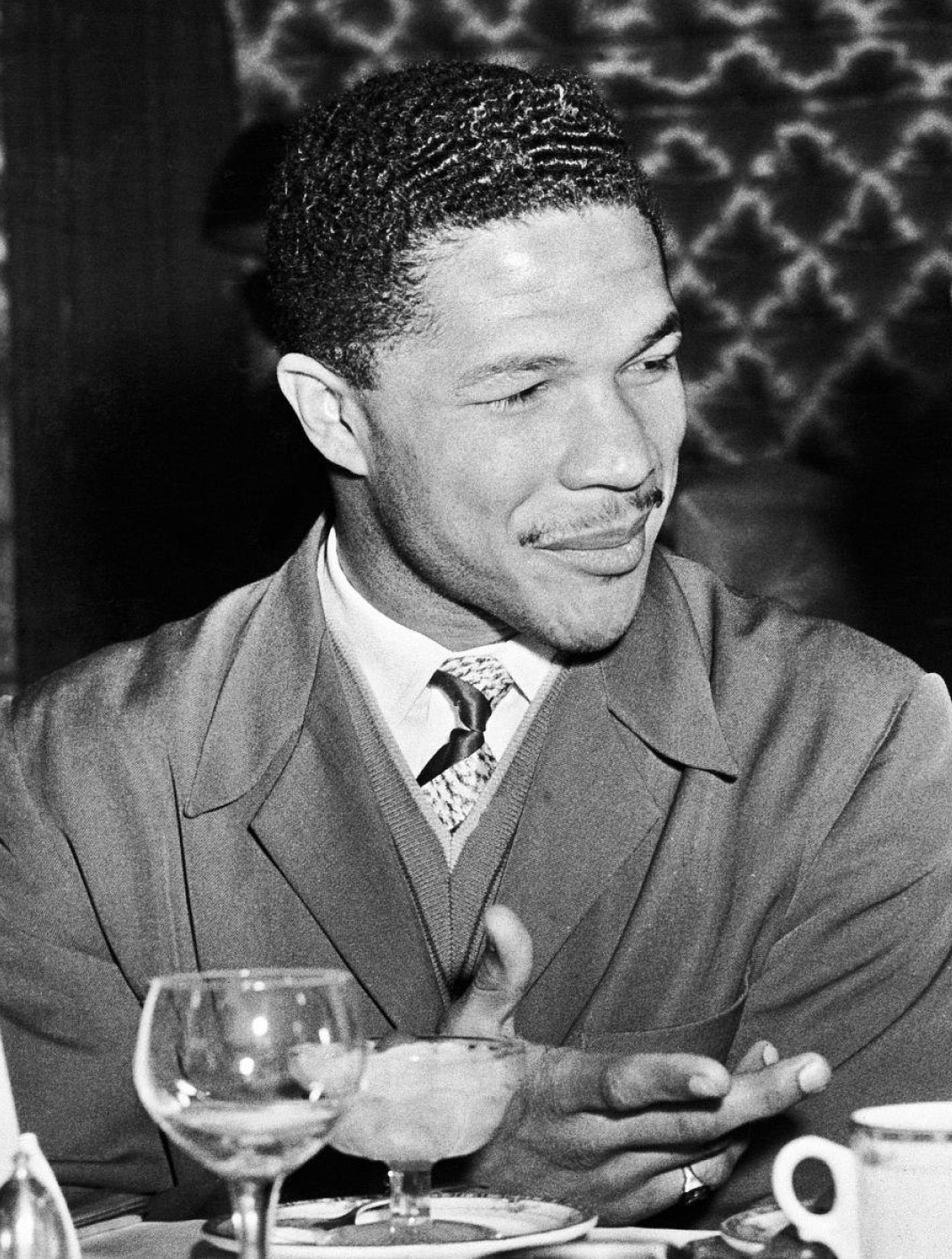
Pompey in 1956

Yolande Pompey (April 22, 1929 – 1979) was a boxer from Trinidad and Tobago. He beat his fellow countryman "Gentle" Daniel in 1950 and 1951. He lost to Bobby Dawson (Leo Birnbaum) in 1954. He lost a fight to Archie Moore in a light heavyweight title fight June 5, 1956, at Harringay Arena. He knocked out German champion Gerhard Hecht in 1957. Pompey also fought Dick Tiger and knocked out Randy Turpin. Scottish champion Chic Calderwood was thought to have ended his career with a knockout that sent 29-year-old Pompey to the hospital. He beat Yvon Durelle, Moses Ward, and Dave Sands.

Pompey was born in Princes Town. His parents died when he was a child and he spent a few years in an orphanage. After his boxing career he worked as a chauffeur for the High Commissioner of Trinidad in London. He died of cancer in London at 49.
