= Belmont Orphanage =

Orphanage in Trinidad and Tobago

St. Dominic's Children's Home, formerly Belmont Orphanage, is located in Port of Spain, Trinidad and Tobago. It was established by French priest Mariano Forestier in 1871 and expanded with additional buildings in subsequent years. The Handbook of Jamaica dates the orphanage to 1892. It was home to the boxer Daniel James, the calypsonian Daniel Brown and the musicians Carl Barriteau and Roy Cape.

Music education was part of the Dominican sect's program at the orphanage's schools. Two wings of the orphanage were destroyed by fire in 1996.
