= Syd Brown (boxer) =

Jamaican boxer (died 1947)

Cecil "Syd" Brown (died November 1947) was a boxer from Jamaica. He was Jamaica's Middleweight Champion and fought in several international bouts. He was also title holder of the West Indies. He competed in international bouts including in Australia and against Trinidad and Tobago's "Gentle Daniel". He was a middleweight champion of Jamaica and trained Prince Buster during Buster's boxing career before Buster became a Ska star.
