= Joey Giardello =

American world champion boxer (1930–2008)

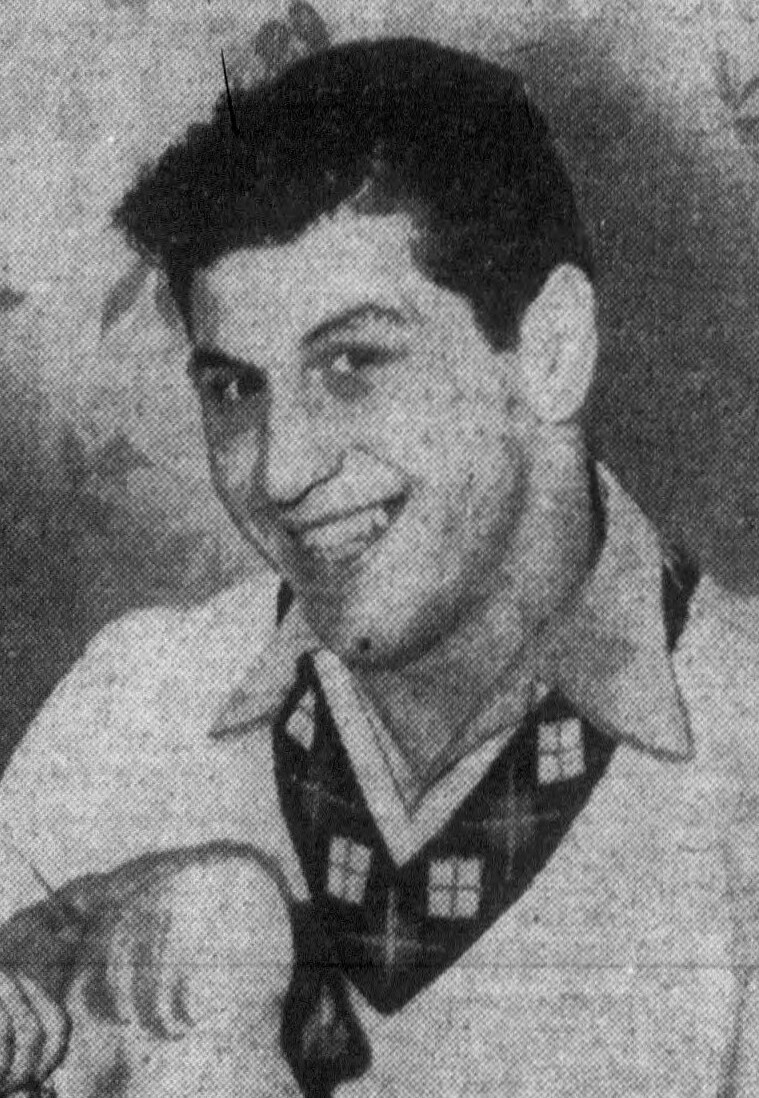
- Giardello, circa 1954

Personal information
- Born: Carmine Orlando Tilelli; July 16, 1930 Brooklyn, New York, U.S.
- Died: September 4, 2008 (aged 78) Cherry Hill, New Jersey, U.S.
- Height: 5 ft 10 in (178 cm)
- Weight: Middleweight

Boxing career
- Reach: 70 in (178 cm)
- Stance: Orthodox

Boxing record
- Total fights: 133
- Wins: 97
- Win by KO: 31
- Losses: 26
- Draws: 8

Carmine Orlando Tilelli (July 16, 1930 – September 4, 2008) was an American boxer who was the world middleweight champion from 1963 to 1965. He adopted the name Joey Giardello (the name of a cousin's friend) in order to join the U.S. Army while underage, and continued to use the pseudonym throughout his boxing career.

== Early life ==
Giardello was born in Brooklyn, but lived most of his life in the Lower Moyamensing area of South Philadelphia. He joined the U.S. Army while underage towards the end of World War II, using a cousin's friend's name, and volunteered for airborne duty. During his military time, he took part in Army boxing matches, and after his discharge in 1948, began boxing professionally. He continued to use the name he had enlisted under, Joey Giardello, in his boxing career.

== Professional career ==
During his early career, he had a scuffle at a gas station which cost him $100,000 in prize fight money and five months in jail.

As a pro, he quickly racked up a 15–1–2 record in his first 18 fights while facing less-than-stellar opposition. His only loss was a decision to undefeated boxer Jimmy Morton. During this time, he fought just three men who had previously won a fight. It caught up with Giardello on January 16, 1950, when he was handed his second defeat by Joe DiMartino, a journeyman with a 6–10 record.

After that embarrassment, he began to face better opposition and by 1951, was beating some of the better middleweight boxers on the Philadelphia scene. On June 4, 1954, Los Angeles-based heavyweight boxer Clarence Henry, who was managed by Mafiosi Frank "Blinky" Palermo, was arrested in New York City for attempting to bribe Oakland middleweight Bobby Jones to throw his June 11 Madison Square Garden match with Giardello. Henry allegedly offered $15,000 to Jones to throw the fight. Once the third-ranked heavyweight contender, Henry was released after posting $2,000 bail and subsequently retired from the ring. Giardello beat Jones in a close decision.

Giardello's fight vs. Billy Graham was the next significant bout. The decision first was awarded to Giardello, then later reversed to a decision in favor of Graham, then reversed again, some time later as a result of litigation, in favor of Giardello. This fight is known in boxing lore as "The reversed reversal."

In 1960, Giardello received his first championship opportunity. On April 20, he faced Gene Fullmer for the National Boxing Association version of the world middleweight title. He missed out on the title when he and Fullmer fought to a draw over 15 rounds.

Giardello lost four of his next six fights, but then came back strong with an 8–1–1 record in his next 10, all of which were over some of the biggest names in the division at that time. One of his wins, a 10-round decision over Henry Hank on January 30, 1962, was chosen as Ring Magazine's fight of the year. Then, on June 24, 1963, Giardello upset boxing legend Sugar Ray Robinson, and at the age of 33, was finally named as the No. 1 challenger for the world middleweight title.

On December 7, 1963, Giardello faced Dick Tiger in Atlantic City for the title and won a controversial decision in 15 rounds.

He reigned as world champion for nearly two years, winning four fights during that time. On December 14, 1964, he fought "Hurricane" Rubin Carter in a title defense. In the first three rounds, Carter stalked Giardello and was the aggressor, as the champion looked to stay away from Carter's left hook. In the 4th round, Carter opened a cut over Giardello's left eye and staggered him with several head shots. By the 13th round, Carter had begun to tire, and Giardello began pounding Carter's head and body, which continued through the 15th and final round. According to Carter, he dominated Giardello the first ten rounds, but Giardello was awarded a unanimous decision, an event dramatized in the 1999 film The Hurricane. Carter would later revise his claims, admitting he should have fought Giardello more aggressively.

In a rematch with Dick Tiger on October 21, 1965, the Nigerian won a unanimous decision over Giardello in 15 rounds to regain the belt. Giardello was described as "back pedaling for most of the fight." Giardello fought just four more times over the next two years before retiring.

== Professional boxing record ==
131 fights	97 wins	26 losses
By knockout	30	4
By decision	67	22
Draws	8	

No.	Result	Record	Opponent	Type	Round, time	Date	Location	Notes
133	Win	98–26–8 (1)	Jack Rodgers	SD	10	Nov 6, 1967	Arena, Philadelphia, Pennsylvania, U.S.	
132	Loss	97–26–8 (1)	Jack Rodgers	UD	10	May 22, 1967	Civic Arena, Pittsburgh, Pennsylvania, U.S.	
131	Loss	97–25–8 (1)	Nate Collins	TKO	8 (10)	Dec 5, 1966	Winterland Arena, San Francisco, California, U.S.	
130	Win	97–24–8 (1)	Cash White	UD	10	Sep 22, 1966	Municipal Stadium, Reading, Pennsylvania, U.S.	
129	Loss	96–24–8 (1)	Dick Tiger	UD	15	Oct 21, 1965	Madison Square Garden, New York City, New York, U.S.	Lost WBA, WBC, and The Ring middleweight titles
128	Win	96–23–8 (1)	Gil Diaz	PTS	10	Apr 23, 1965	Arena, Cherry Hill, New Jersey, U.S.	
127	Win	95–23–8 (1)	Rubin Carter	UD	15	Dec 14, 1964	Convention Hall, Philadelphia, Pennsylvania, U.S.	Retained WBA, WBC, and The Ring middleweight titles
126	Win	94–23–8 (1)	Juan Carlos Rivera	UD	10	May 22, 1964	Arena, Cleveland, Ohio, U.S.	
125	Win	93–23–8 (1)	Juan Carlos Rivera	SD	10	Apr 17, 1964	Arena, Cleveland, Ohio, U.S.	
124	Win	92–23–8 (1)	Dick Tiger	PTS	15	Dec 7, 1963	Convention Hall, Atlantic City, New Jersey, U.S.	Won WBA, WBC, and The Ring middleweight titles
123	Win	91–23–8 (1)	Sugar Ray Robinson	UD	10	Jun 24, 1963	Convention Hall, Philadelphia, Pennsylvania, U.S.	
122	Win	90–23–8 (1)	Ernest Burford	UD	10	Mar 25, 1963	Arena, Philadelphia, Pennsylvania, U.S.	
121	Win	89–23–8 (1)	Wilf Greaves	SD	10	Feb 25, 1963	Jacksonville, Florida, U.S.	
120	Win	88–23–8 (1)	Johnny Morris	SD	10	Nov 12, 1962	Civic Center, Baltimore, Maryland, U.S.	
119	Loss	87–23–8 (1)	George Benton	UD	10	Aug 6, 1962	Convention Hall, Philadelphia, Pennsylvania, U.S.	
118	Win	87–22–8 (1)	Jimmy Beecham	UD	10	Jul 9, 1962	Midway Stadium, Saint Paul, Minnesota, U.S.	
117	Win	86–22–8 (1)	Henry Hank	MD	10	Jan 30, 1962	Convention Hall, Philadelphia, Pennsylvania, U.S.	
116	Draw	85–22–8 (1)	Joe DeNucci	MD	10	Dec 12, 1961	Boston Garden, Boston, Massachusetts, U.S.	
115	Win	85–22–7 (1)	Jesse Smith	UD	10	Nov 6, 1961	International Amphitheatre, Chicago, Illinois, U.S.	
114	Win	84–22–7 (1)	Jesse Smith	UD	10	Sep 12, 1961	Arena, Philadelphia, Pennsylvania, U.S.	
113	Loss	83–22–7 (1)	Henry Hank	UD	10	Jul 10, 1961	Convention Arena, Detroit, Michigan, U.S.	
112	Win	83–21–7 (1)	Wilf Greaves	TKO	9 (10)	May 15, 1961	Alhambra A.C., Philadelphia, Pennsylvania, U.S.	
111	Loss	82–21–7 (1)	Ralph Dupas	UD	10	Mar 6, 1961	Municipal Auditorium, New Orleans, Louisiana, U.S.	
110	Loss	82–20–7 (1)	Peter Müller	PTS	10	Dec 1, 1960	Messesporthalle, Cologne, West Germany	
109	Loss	82–19–7 (1)	Terry Downes	PTS	10	Oct 11, 1960	Empire Pool, London, England, U.K.	
108	Win	82–18–7 (1)	Clarence Hinnant	TKO	3 (10)	Sep 27, 1960	Shrine Auditorium, Billings, Montana, U.S.	
107	Draw	81–18–7 (1)	Gene Fullmer	SD	15	Apr 20, 1960	Montana St. College Fieldhouse, Bozeman, Montana, U.S.	For NBA middleweight title
106	Win	81–18–6 (1)	Dick Tiger	UD	10	Nov 4, 1959	Arena, Cleveland, Ohio, U.S.	
105	Loss	80–18–6 (1)	Dick Tiger	UD	10	Sep 30, 1959	Chicago Stadium, Chicago, Illinois, U.S.	
104	Win	80–17–6 (1)	Chico Vejar	SD	10	Aug 11, 1959	Midway Stadium, Saint Paul, Minnesota, U.S.	
103	Win	79–17–6 (1)	Del Flanagan	KO	1 (10)	Jun 16, 1959	Auditorium, Saint Paul, Minnesota, U.S.	
102	Win	78–17–6 (1)	Holley Mims	SD	10	May 6, 1959	Capitol Arena, Washington, D.C., U.S.	
101	Loss	77–17–6 (1)	Ralph Tiger Jones	SD	10	Jan 28, 1959	Freedom Hall, Louisville, Kentucky, U.S.	
100	Loss	77–16–6 (1)	Ellsworth Webb	TKO	7 (10)	Nov 19, 1958	Cow Palace, Daly City, California, U.S.	
99	Loss	77–15–6 (1)	Joey Giambra	SD	10	Jun 30, 1958	Cow Palace, Daly City, California, U.S.	
98	Win	77–14–6 (1)	Frank Szuzina	MD	10	Jun 11, 1958	Shoreham Terrace, Washington, D.C., U.S.	
97	Win	76–14–6 (1)	Rory Calhoun	UD	10	May 5, 1958	Cow Palace, Daly City, California, U.S.	
96	Win	75–14–6 (1)	Franz Szuzina	UD	10	Feb 12, 1958	Arena, Philadelphia, Pennsylvania, U.S.	
95	Win	74–14–6 (1)	Ralph Tiger Jones	UD	10	Dec 27, 1957	Auditorium, Miami Beach, Florida, U.S.	
94	Win	73–14–6 (1)	Wilf Greaves	UD	10	Nov 5, 1957	Denver Coliseum, Denver, Colorado, U.S.	
93	Win	72–14–6 (1)	Bobby Lane	TKO	7 (10)	Sep 27, 1957	Arena, Cleveland, Ohio, U.S.	
92	Win	71–14–6 (1)	Chico Vejar	UD	10	Jul 17, 1957	Freedom Hall, Louisville, Kentucky, U.S.	
91	Win	70–14–6 (1)	Joe Gray	RTD	5 (10)	Jul 2, 1957	Michigan State Fairgrounds Coliseum, Detroit, Michigan, U.S.	
90	Win	69–14–6 (1)	Rory Calhoun	SD	10	May 17, 1957	Arena, Cleveland, Ohio, U.S.	
88	Win	68–14–6	Randy Sandy	SD	10	Feb 6, 1957	Chicago Stadium, Chicago, Illinois, U.S.	
87	Win	67–14–6	Charley Cotton	UD	10	Dec 14, 1956	Arena, Cleveland, Ohio, U.S.	
86	Win	66–14–6	Charley Cotton	UD	10	Nov 15, 1956	Arena, Milwaukee, Wisconsin, U.S.	
85	Win	65–14–6	Bobby Boyd	KO	5 (10)	Sep 28, 1956	Arena, Cleveland, Ohio, U.S.	
84	Win	64–14–6	Georgia Kid	TKO	9 (10)	Aug 28, 1956	Auditorium, Miami Beach, Florida, U.S.	
83	Win	63–14–6	Franz Szuzina	UD	10	Jul 26, 1956	Auditorium, Milwaukee, Wisconsin, U.S.	
82	Win	62–14–6	Tony Baldoni	KO	1 (10)	Jul 2, 1956	St. Nicholas Arena, New York City, New York, U.S.	
81	Loss	61–14–6	Charley Cotton	SD	10	May 28, 1956	St. Nicholas Arena, New York City, New York, U.S.	
80	Loss	61–13–6	Charley Cotton	UD	10	May 7, 1956	St. Nicholas Arena, New York City, New York, U.S.	
79	Win	61–12–6	Joe Shaw	UD	10	Mar 27, 1956	Town Hall, Philadelphia, Pennsylvania, U.S.	
78	Win	60–12–6	Hurley Sanders	PTS	10	Mar 10, 1956	Armory, Paterson, New Jersey, U.S.	
77	Win	59–12–6	Tim Jones	TKO	10 (10)	Feb 11, 1956	Arena, Trenton, New Jersey, U.S.	
76	Win	58–12–6	Peter Müller	KO	2 (10)	Mar 1, 1955	Arena, Milwaukee, Wisconsin, U.S.	
75	Win	57–12–6	Andy Mayfield	TKO	8 (10)	Feb 15, 1955	Auditorium, Miami Beach, Florida, U.S.	
74	Win	56–12–6	Al Andrews	UD	10	Jan 25, 1955	Municipal Auditorium, Norfolk, Virginia, U.S.	
73	Win	55–12–6	Ralph Tiger Jones	UD	10	Sep 24, 1954	Arena, Philadelphia, Pennsylvania, U.S.	
72	Win	54–12–6	Billy Kilgore	UD	10	Jul 7, 1954	Arena, Philadelphia, Pennsylvania, U.S.	
71	Win	53–12–6	Bobby Jones	UD	10	Jun 11, 1954	Madison Square Garden, New York City, New York, U.S.	
70	Loss	52–12–6	Pierre Langlois	UD	10	May 21, 1954	Madison Square Garden, New York City, New York, U.S.	
69	Win	52–11–6	Willie Troy	TKO	7 (10)	Mar 19, 1954	Madison Square Garden, New York City, New York, U.S.	
68	Win	51–11–6	Walter Cartier	TKO	1 (10)	Feb 5, 1954	Madison Square Garden, New York City, New York, U.S.	
67	Win	50–11–6	Garth Panter	TKO	5 (10)	Jan 8, 1954	Madison Square Garden, New York City, New York, U.S.	
66	Win	49–11–6	Tuzo Portuguez	UD	10	Nov 23, 1953	Eastern Parkway Arena, New York City, New York, U.S.	
65	Win	48–11–6	Walter Cartier	UD	10	Oct 26, 1953	Eastern Parkway Arena, New York City, New York, U.S.	
64	Loss	47–11–6	Johnny Saxton	UD	10	Sep 29, 1953	Arena, Philadelphia, Pennsylvania, U.S.	
63	Win	47–10–6	Ernie Durando	UD	10	Jun 26, 1953	Madison Square Garden, New York City, New York, U.S.	
62	Win	46–10–6	Hurley Sanders	PTS	10	May 30, 1953	Laurel Garden, Newark, New Jersey, U.S.	
61	Win	45–10–6	Gil Turner	UD	10	Apr 7, 1953	Arena, Philadelphia, Pennsylvania, U.S.	
60	Loss	44–10–6	Billy Graham	UD	12	Mar 6, 1953	Madison Square Garden, New York City, New York, U.S.	
59	Win	44–9–6	Harold Green	UD	10	Feb 2, 1953	Eastern Parkway Arena, New York City, New York, U.S.	
58	Win	43–9–6	Billy Graham	SD	10	Dec 19, 1952	Madison Square Garden, New York City, New York, U.S.	
57	Loss	42–9–6	Joey Giambra	UD	10	Nov 11, 1952	Memorial Auditorium, Buffalo, New York, U.S.	
56	Win	42–8–6	Joey Giambra	UD	10	Oct 13, 1952	Eastern Parkway Arena, New York City, New York, U.S.	
55	Win	41–8–6	Georgie Small	UD	10	Sep 15, 1952	Eastern Parkway Arena, New York City, New York, U.S.	
54	Win	40–8–6	Billy Graham	SD	10	Aug 4, 1952	Eastern Parkway Arena, New York City, New York, U.S.	
53	Win	39–8–6	Pierre Langlis	UD	10	Jun 23, 1952	Eastern Parkway Arena, New York City, New York, U.S.	
52	Win	38–8–6	Roy Wouters	PTS	6	Jun 5, 1952	Municipal Stadium, Philadelphia, Pennsylvania, U.S.	
51	Draw	37–8–6	Joe Miceli	PTS	10	May 5, 1952	Watres Armory, Scranton, Pennsylvania, U.S.	
50	Draw	37–8–5	Sammy Giuliani	PTS	8	Mar 28, 1952	Madison Square Garden, New York City, New York, U.S.	
49	Draw	37–8–4	Sal DiMartino	PTS	10	Jan 9, 1952	Auditorium, Miami Beach, Florida, U.S.	
48	Loss	37–8–3	Bobby Dykes	SD	10	Dec 12, 1951	Auditorium, Miami Beach, Florida, U.S.	
47	Loss	37–7–3	Rocky Castellani	MD	10	Nov 13, 1951	Catholic Youth Center, Scranton, Pennsylvania, U.S.	
46	Win	37–6–3	Tony Amato	KO	7 (8)	Oct 8, 1951	St. Nicholas Arena, New York City, New York, U.S.	
45	Win	36–6–3	Tommy Bazzano	PTS	6	Sep 14, 1951	Madison Square Garden, New York City, New York, U.S.	
44	Win	35–6–3	Johnny Noel	UD	8	Aug 27, 1951	Toppi Stadium, Philadelphia, Pennsylvania, U.S.	
43	Win	34–6–3	Otis Graham	UD	8	Aug 13, 1951	Toppi Stadium, Philadelphia, Pennsylvania, U.S.	
42	Loss	33–6–3	Gus Rubicini	PTS	8	May 25, 1951	Madison Square Garden, New York City, New York, U.S.	
41	Win	33–5–3	Ernie Durando	UD	10	Apr 30, 1951	Watres Armory, Scranton, Pennsylvania, U.S.	
40	Win	32–5–3	Roy Wouters	UD	8	Apr 12, 1951	Metropolitan Opera House, Philadelphia, Pennsylvania, U.S.	
39	Win	31–5–3	Primos Cutler	PTS	8	Mar 29, 1951	Metropolitan Opera House, Philadelphia, Pennsylvania, U.S.	
38	Loss	30–5–3	Roy Wouters	MD	8	Mar 15, 1951	Metropolitan Opera House, Philadelphia, Pennsylvania, U.S.	
37	Win	30–4–3	Tony Wolfe	KO	3 (8)	Feb 24, 1951	Cambria A.C., Philadelphia, Pennsylvania, U.S.	
36	Win	29–4–3	Harold Sampson	SD	8	Feb 22, 1951	Eastern Parkway Arena, New York City, New York, U.S.	
35	Win	28–4–3	Jan Henri	UD	8	Jan 27, 1951	Cambria A.C., Philadelphia, Pennsylvania, U.S.	
34	Win	27–4–3	Freddie Lott	PTS	8	Jan 6, 1951	Ridgewood Grove, New York City, New York, U.S.	
33	Win	26–4–3	Leroy Coleman	KO	5 (6)	Dec 18, 1950	Arena, Philadelphia, Pennsylvania, U.S.	
32	Draw	25–4–3	George Roberts	PTS	6	Nov 27, 1950	Convention Hall, Philadelphia, Pennsylvania, U.S.	
31	Loss	25–4–2	Harold Green	RTD	6 (10)	Oct 26, 1950	Eastern Parkway Arena, New York City, New York, U.S.	
30	Win	25–3–2	Bruce Ubaldo	PTS	8	Oct 16, 1950	South Main Street Armory, Wilkes-Barre, Pennsylvania, U.S.	
29	Win	24–3–2	Ted DiGiammo	KO	1 (6)	Sep 26, 1950	South Main Street Armory, Wilkes-Barre, Pennsylvania, U.S.	
28	Win	23–3–2	Don Berry	KO	1 (6)	Aug 25, 1950	Scranton Stadium, Scranton, Pennsylvania, U.S.	
27	Loss	22–3–2	Carey Mace	TKO	8 (8)	May 17, 1950	St. Nicholas Arena, New York City, New York, U.S.	
26	Win	22–2–2	Hurley Sanders	UD	8	May 5, 1950	Broadway Arena, New York City, New York, U.S.	
25	Win	21–2–2	Tommy Varsos	KO	1 (8)	Apr 20, 1950	Broadway Arena, New York City, New York, U.S.	
24	Win	20–2–2	Steve Sabatino	KO	1 (8)	Mar 27, 1950	Arena, Philadelphia, Pennsylvania, U.S.	
23	Win	19–2–2	Armando Amanini	PTS	8	Mar 23, 1950	Broadway Arena, New York City, New York, U.S.	
22	Win	18–2–2	Johnny Bernardo	MD	8	Feb 9, 1950	Metropolitan Opera House, Philadelphia, Pennsylvania, U.S.	
21	Win	17–2–2	Johnny Bernardo	PTS	8	Jan 26, 1950	Metropolitan Opera House, Philadelphia, Pennsylvania, U.S.	
20	Loss	16–2–2	Joe DiMartino	PTS	8	Jan 16, 1950	Arena, New Haven, Connecticut, U.S.	
19	Win	16–1–2	Johnny Fry	PTS	6	Jan 5, 1950	Metropolitan Opera House, Philadelphia, Pennsylvania, U.S.	
18	Win	15–1–2	Jim Dockery	KO	2 (6)	Dec 5, 1949	Convention Hall, Philadelphia, Pennsylvania, U.S.	
17	Win	14–1–2	Mitch Allen	PTS	6	Nov 14, 1949	Arena, Philadelphia, Pennsylvania, U.S.	
16	Win	13–1–2	Leroy Fleming	KO	1 (6)	Jul 13, 1949	Griffith Stadium, Washington, D.C., U.S.	
15	Win	12–1–2	Ray Haas	TKO	3 (6)	Jun 20, 1949	Toppi Stadium, Philadelphia, Pennsylvania, U.S.	
14	Win	11–1–2	Henry Vonsavage	TKO	2 (6)	June 6, 1949	Toppi Stadium, Philadelphia, Pennsylvania, U.S.	
13	Win	10–1–2	Emerson Charles	PTS	4	May 2, 1949	Arena, Philadelphia, Pennsylvania, U.S.	
12	Win	9–1–2	Joe Aurillo	PTS	6	Apr 28, 1949	Metropolitan Opera House, Philadelphia, Pennsylvania, U.S.	
11	Win	8–1–2	Ray Morris	PTS	4	Apr 25, 1949	South Main Street Armory, Wilkes-Barre, Pennsylvania, U.S.	
10	Win	7–1–2	Bill Mongomery	KO	1 (6)	Apr 7, 1949	Metropolitan Opera House, Philadelphia, Pennsylvania, U.S.	
9	Win	6–1–2	Johnny Brown	PTS	4	Mar 29, 1949	Little Palestra, Allentown, Pennsylvania, U.S.	
8	Win	5–1–2	Don Ennis	KO	4 (6)	Mar 15, 1949	Reading, Pennsylvania, U.S.	
7	Draw	4–1–2	Clyde Diggs	PTS	6	Feb 24, 1949	Metropolitan Opera House, Philadelphia, Pennsylvania, U.S.	
6	Loss	4–1–1	Jimmy Morton	PTS	6	Jan 13, 1949	Metropolitan Opera House, Philadelphia, Pennsylvania, U.S.	
5	Win	4–0–1	Willie Wigfall	TKO	1 (4)	Dec 30, 1948	Metropolitan Opera House, Philadelphia, Pennsylvania, U.S.	
4	Draw	3–0–1	Bobby Thomas	PTS	4	Dec 17, 1948	Kingston Armory, Kingston, Pennsylvania, U.S.	
3	Win	3–0	Johnny Madison	KO	1 (4)	Dec 16, 1948	Hamid's Pier, Atlantic City, New Jersey, U.S.	
2	Win	2–0	Jackie Cole	KO	1 (4)	Nov 16, 1948	Arena, Trenton, New Jersey, U.S.	
1	Win	1–0	Jimmy Larkin	KO	1 (4)	Oct 10, 1948	Atlantic City, New Jersey, U.S.	

== Titles in boxing ==
=== Major world titles ===
- WBA middleweight champion (160 lbs)
- WBC middleweight champion (160 lbs)

=== The Ring magazine titles ===
- The Ring middleweight champion (160 lbs)

=== Undisputed titles ===
- Undisputed middleweight champion

== Life after boxing ==
After retirement, he went into private business and went back to his real name. He was an insurance salesman and later joined the Misco International Chemical Company as their New York-Philadelphia-New Jersey distributor. He had married his wife Rosalie in 1950, with whom he had four children. He did work with the intellectually disabled, particularly for St. John of God School Community Services in Westville Grove, New Jersey, where his son, Carman, who had Down syndrome, lived for ten years. He met the pope and was invited to President John F. Kennedy's Inauguration. With his celebrity and title, he participated in countless fundraising events for the intellectually disabled and contributed his time and talent to the Special Olympics, founded by Eunice Kennedy Shriver. At one event he taught the Special Olympians to jump rope.

He had a small role as a man from "The Syndicate" in the 1975 movie Moonrunners.

In 1996, he was invited to a Hungarian TV talk-show, (Friderikusz show) in which he made appearance in Budapest, Hungary, to celebrate Laszlo Papp's 70th birthday, that was an honorary invitation because of eastern communist block did not let Papp to match with Giardello in 1966, therefore Giardello could keep holding the two world titles, while Laszlo Papp was forced by the communist Hungarian government to bring his boxing career to an end.

He later filed a federal lawsuit against Universal Pictures, Beacon Communications and Aloof Films, for unspecified damages, for its "thoroughly false depiction" of his bout with Rubin Carter in Norman Jewison's 1999 film The Hurricane. The case was settled out-of-court and the DVD version of the film included scenes from the actual fight, as well as Jewison's statement that Giardello "no doubt" was a great fighter.

He died on September 4, 2008, in Cherry Hill, New Jersey. He was 78 years old.

== Honors ==
Giardello was inducted into the Philadelphia Sports Hall of Fame in 2009, the 3rd boxer to be inducted after Joe Frazier (2004) and Tommy Loughran (2008). He was inducted into the International Boxing Hall of Fame in 1993. His career record was 101 wins, 25 losses and 7 draws. He was 5-3-1 against other boxers in the Hall of Fame, including a 2–2 mark against Tiger.

A public statue honoring Giardello is situated in the East Passyunk Crossing section of South Philadelphia.

== See also ==
- List of world middleweight boxing champions

Sporting positions
World boxing titles
Preceded by Dick Tiger	WBA middleweight champion December 7, 1963 – October 21, 1965	Succeeded by Dick Tiger
Preceded by Dick Tiger	WBC middleweight champion December 7, 1963 – October 21, 1965	Succeeded by Dick Tiger
Preceded by Dick Tiger	The Ring middleweight champion December 7, 1963 – October 21, 1965	Succeeded by Dick Tiger
Preceded by Dick Tiger	Undisputed middleweight champion December 7, 1963 – October 21, 1965	Succeeded by Dick Tiger
Awards
Previous: Joe Brown vs. Dave Charnley II	The Ring Fight of the Year vs. Henry Hank II; 1962	Succeeded by Cassius Clay vs. Doug Jones
