= Paul Pender =

American boxer

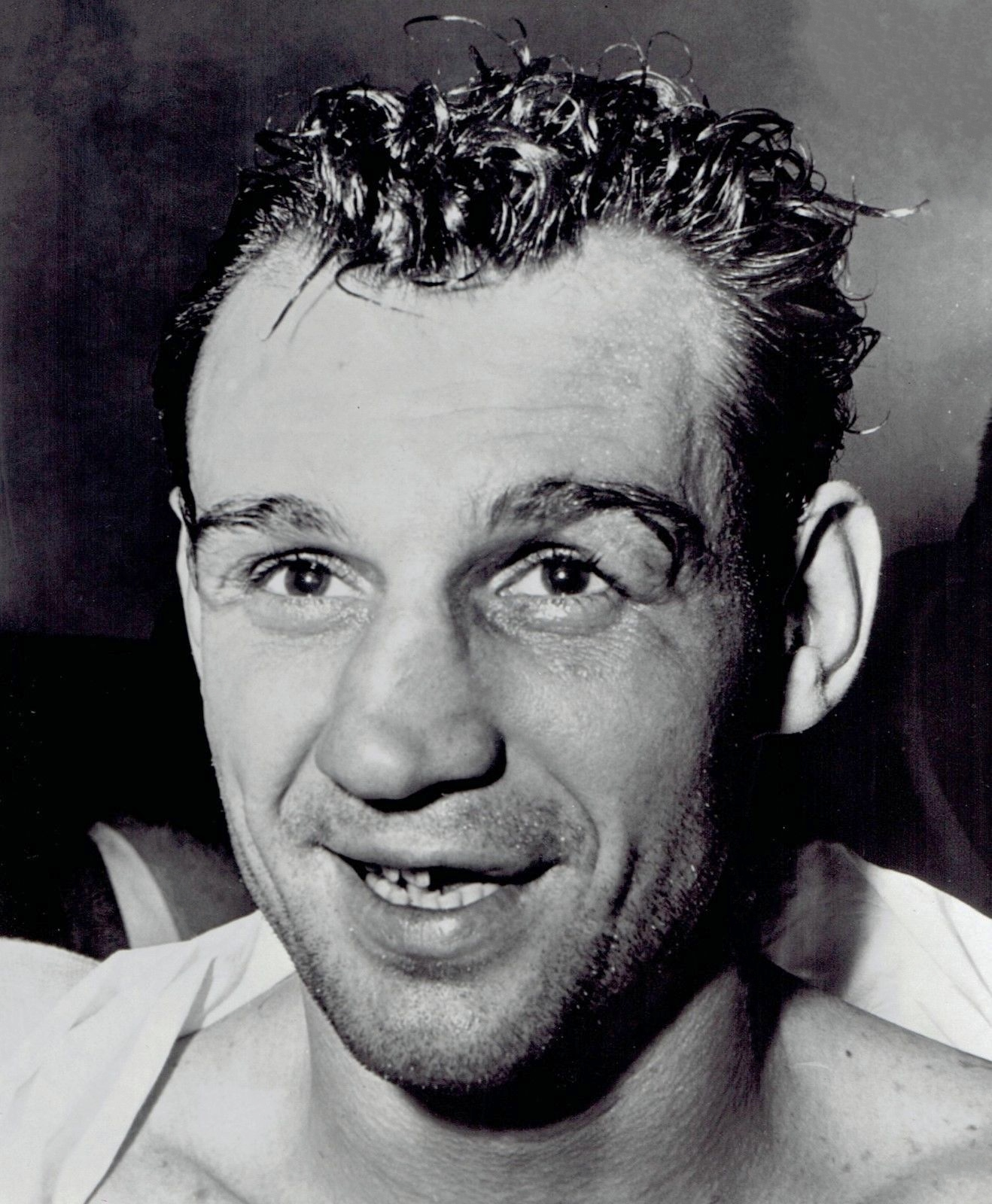
- Paul Pender in 1960

Personal information
- Born: Paul Pender; June 20, 1930 Brookline, Massachusetts
- Died: January 12, 2003 (aged 72) Bedford, Massachusetts
- Height: 5 ft 10 in (178 cm)
- Weight: Middleweight

Boxing career
- Reach: 72 in (183 cm)
- Stance: Orthodox

Boxing record
- Total fights: 48
- Wins: 40
- Win by KO: 20
- Losses: 6
- Draws: 2
- No contests: 0

Paul Pender (June 20, 1930 – January 12, 2003), was an American professional boxer and firefighter from Massachusetts who was a two-time World Middleweight Champion between 1960 and 1962.

== Early life ==
Pender was born in the Boston suburb of Brookline, Massachusetts, the son of William and Anna (Lyster) Pender. A 1949 graduate of Brookline High School, Pender was recruited as an all American football player at Michigan State University and Penn State, but instead, chose to enter professional boxing, while attending Staley College. Although a champion, he regarded boxing as his second job and being a Brookline firefighter his first. As an amateur, he won the New England welterweight championship.

Pender was a member of the United States Marine Corps.

== Professional career ==
In 1959, the National Boxing Association withdrew its recognition of Sugar Ray Robinson as middleweight champion. Gene Fullmer and Carmen Basilio fought for the vacant NBA title, and Fullmer won. Pender beat Robinson, one of the greatest fighters of all time, for the disputed middleweight championship title. He won by split decision in 15 rounds. Pender fought Robinson once again to defend his title and went on to beat him by split decision.

He fought a set of three matches against English boxer Terry Downes, of which only the third (on April 7, 1962) went the full distance. He won the first and the third bout, but the last would prove to be the only fight of that year for Pender and the last of his career. The New York Boxing Commission stripped Pender of his title for not defending it against Dick Tiger. Pender sued and won on appeal.

His career was hampered by his brittle hands. He retired May 7, 1963 as the current world middleweight champion.

His career record was 40 wins (20 by KO), 6 losses, and 2 draws.

== Death ==
He died in Bedford, Massachusetts on January 12, 2003, at the Veterans Administration Hospital.

== Professional boxing record ==
| 48 fights | 40 wins | 6 losses |
|---|---|---|
| By knockout | 20 | 3 |
| By decision | 19 | 3 |
| By disqualification | 1 | 0 |
| Draws | 2 | |

| No. | Result | Record | Opponent | Type | Round | Date | Location | Notes |
|---|---|---|---|---|---|---|---|---|
| 48 | Win | 40–6–2 | Terry Downes | UD | 15 | Apr 7, 1962 | Boston Garden, Boston, Massachusetts, U.S. | Won NYSAC and The Ring middleweight titles |
| 47 | Loss | 39–6–2 | Terry Downes | RTD | 9 (15) | Jul 11, 1961 | Empire Pool, Wembley, London, England | Lost NYSAC and The Ring middleweight titles |
| 46 | Win | 39–5–2 | Carmen Basilio | UD | 15 | Apr 22, 1961 | Boston Garden, Boston, Massachusetts, U.S. | Retained NYSAC and The Ring middleweight titles |
| 45 | Win | 38–5–2 | Terry Downes | TKO | 9 (15) | Jan 14, 1961 | Arena, Boston, Massachusetts, U.S. | Retained NYSAC and The Ring middleweight titles |
| 44 | Win | 37–5–2 | Sugar Ray Robinson | SD | 15 | Jun 10, 1960 | Boston Garden, Boston, Massachusetts, U.S. | Retained NYSAC and The Ring middleweight titles |
| 43 | Win | 36–5–2 | Sugar Ray Robinson | SD | 15 | Jan 22, 1960 | Boston Garden, Boston, Massachusetts, U.S. | Won NYSAC and The Ring middleweight titles |
| 42 | Win | 35–5–2 | Gene Hamilton | UD | 10 | Dec 14, 1959 | Boston Garden, Boston, Massachusetts, U.S. | |
| 41 | Win | 34–5–2 | Jackson Brown | UD | 12 | Aug 17, 1959 | Pierce Memorial Field, East Providence, Rhode Island, U.S. | Won USA New England middleweight title |
| 40 | Win | 33–5–2 | Ralph Tiger Jones | UD | 10 | Mar 17, 1959 | Boston Garden, Boston, Massachusetts, U.S. | |
| 39 | Win | 32–5–2 | Joe Shaw | TKO | 5 (10) | Feb 16, 1959 | Arcadia Ballroom, Providence, Rhode Island, U.S. | |
| 38 | Win | 31–5–2 | Young Beau Jack | DQ | 3 (10) | Feb 9, 1959 | Arcadia Ballroom, Providence, Rhode Island, U.S. | Jack was DQ'd after he knocked Pender out and proceeded to attack him while unconscious on the canvas |
| 37 | Win | 30–5–2 | Joe Gomes | TKO | 6 (10) | Jan 5, 1959 | Rhode Island Auditorium, Providence, Rhode Island, U.S. | Fight stopped on cuts |
| 36 | Win | 29–5–2 | Willie Kid Johnson | TKO | 3 (10) | Dec 22, 1958 | Arcadia Ballroom, Providence, Rhode Island, U.S. | |
| 35 | Win | 28–5–2 | Pete Adams | TKO | 4 (10) | Dec 15, 1958 | Arena, Boston, Massachusetts, U.S. | |
| 34 | Win | 27–5–2 | Jackson Brown | TKO | 3 (10) | Nov 17, 1958 | Boston Garden, Boston, Massachusetts, U.S. | |
| 33 | Win | 26–5–2 | Jimmy Skinner | UD | 10 | Dec 4, 1956 | Mechanics Building, Boston, Massachusetts, U.S. | |
| 32 | Loss | 25–5–2 | Gene Fullmer | UD | 10 | Feb 14, 1955 | Eastern Parkway Arena, Brooklyn, New York City, New York, U.S. | |
| 31 | Win | 25–4–2 | Freddie Mack | TKO | 4 (10) | Jan 6, 1955 | Mechanics Building, Boston, Massachusetts, U.S. | |
| 30 | Win | 24–4–2 | Ted Olla | SD | 10 | Dec 20, 1954 | Eastern Parkway Arena, Brooklyn, New York City, New York, U.S. | |
| 29 | Win | 23–4–2 | Larry Villeneuve | UD | 10 | Aug 3, 1954 | Arena, Boston, Massachusetts, U.S. | |
| 28 | Loss | 22–4–2 | Jimmy Beau | TKO | 5 (10) | Mar 31, 1952 | Boston Garden, Boston, Massachusetts, U.S. | |
| 27 | Win | 22–3–2 | Otis Graham | UD | 10 | Oct 1, 1951 | Mechanics Building, Boston, Massachusetts, U.S. | |
| 26 | Loss | 21–3–2 | Gene Hairston | KO | 3 (10) | Apr 30, 1951 | Boston Garden, Boston, Massachusetts, U.S. | |
| 25 | Draw | 21–2–2 | Joe Rindone | PTS | 10 | Mar 12, 1951 | Boston Garden, Boston, Massachusetts, U.S. | |
| 24 | Loss | 21–2–1 | Joe Rindone | UD | 10 | Jan 22, 1951 | Boston Garden, Boston, Massachusetts, U.S. | |
| 23 | Win | 21–1–1 | Norman Hayes | KO | 7 (10) | Jan 8, 1951 | Mechanics Building, Boston, Massachusetts, U.S. | |
| 22 | Loss | 20–1–1 | Norman Hayes | UD | 10 | Dec 11, 1950 | Mechanics Building, Boston, Massachusetts, U.S. | |
| 21 | Win | 20–0–1 | Harold Sampson | TKO | 3 (10) | Nov 27, 1950 | Mechanics Building, Boston, Massachusetts, U.S. | |
| 20 | Win | 19–0–1 | Norman Horton | KO | 2 (10) | Nov 13, 1950 | Mechanics Building, Boston, Massachusetts, U.S. | |
| 19 | Win | 18–0–1 | Ernie Durando | UD | 10 | Oct 23, 1950 | Arena, Boston, Massachusetts, U.S. | |
| 18 | Win | 17–0–1 | Roy Wouters | UD | 10 | Oct 9, 1950 | Miners Forum, Glace Bay, Nova Scotia, Canada | |
| 17 | Win | 16–0–1 | Bobby James | UD | 10 | Sep 25, 1950 | Arena, Boston, Massachusetts, U.S. | |
| 16 | Win | 15–0–1 | Al Couture | TKO | 7 (10) | Jun 22, 1950 | Exposition Building, Portland, Maine, U.S. | |
| 15 | Win | 14–0–1 | Charley Dodson | UD | 10 | May 3, 1950 | Exposition Building, Portland, Maine, U.S. | |
| 14 | Win | 13–0–1 | Leon Brown | TKO | 5 (8) | Mar 27, 1950 | Rhode Island Auditorium, Providence, Rhode Island, U.S. | |
| 13 | Win | 12–0–1 | Sonny Horne | UD | 10 | Jan 23, 1950 | Boston Garden, Boston, Massachusetts, U.S. | |
| 12 | Draw | 11–0–1 | Bill Daley | PTS | 10 | Dec 19, 1949 | Mechanics Building, Boston, Massachusetts, U.S. | |
| 11 | Win | 11–0 | Bill Daley | UD | 8 | Oct 21, 1949 | Mechanics Building, Boston, Massachusetts, U.S. | |
| 10 | Win | 10–0 | Jose Contreras | KO | 2 (6) | Oct 5, 1949 | Mechanics Hall, Worcester, Massachusetts, U.S. | |
| 9 | Win | 9–0 | Mike Gillo | PTS | 6 | Sep 26, 1949 | Arena, New Haven, Connecticut, U.S. | |
| 8 | Win | 8–0 | Ted Brassley | TKO | 3 (6) | Sep 12, 1949 | Mechanics Building, Boston, Massachusetts, U.S. | |
| 7 | Win | 7–0 | Eddie Richardson | KO | 1 (?) | Jun 9, 1949 | Candlelite Stadium, Bridgeport, Connecticut, U.S. | |
| 6 | Win | 6–0 | Mike Saad | UD | 6 | May 2, 1949 | Boston Garden, Boston, Massachusetts, U.S. | |
| 5 | Win | 5–0 | Johnny Rice | KO | 1 (6) | Apr 11, 1949 | Arena, Boston, Massachusetts, U.S. | |
| 4 | Win | 4–0 | George Meyers | KO | 3 (6) | Mar 28, 1949 | Arena, Boston, Massachusetts, U.S. | |
| 3 | Win | 3–0 | Frank Theodore | KO | 2 (4) | Mar 3, 1949 | Boston Garden, Boston, Massachusetts, U.S. | |
| 2 | Win | 2–0 | Mickey Lane | KO | 2 (6) | Feb 17, 1949 | Mechanics Building, Boston, Massachusetts, U.S. | |
| 1 | Win | 1–0 | Paul Williams | KO | 1 (4) | Jan 28, 1949 | Mechanics Building, Boston, Massachusetts, U.S. | |

== See also ==
- List of middleweight boxing champions

Achievements
| Preceded by Sugar Ray Robinson | World Middleweight Champion; January 2, 1960 – June 11, 1961 | Succeeded by Terry Downes |
| Preceded by Terry Downes | The Ring Middleweight Champion; April 7, 1962 – May 7, 1963; Retired | Succeeded by Dick Tiger; Awarded title |
| Preceded by Terry Downes | Lineal Middleweight Champion; April 7, 1962 – May 7, 1963; Retired | Vacant Title next held by Dick Tiger |
