= Wilf Greaves =

Canadian boxer (1935–2020)

Personal information
- Nickname: Wilfie
- Born: 7 December 1935 Entwistle, Alberta, Canada
- Died: 26 August 2020 (aged 84) Fort Myers, Florida, U.S.
- Height: 5 ft 10 in (1.78 m)
- Weight: light middle/middle/light heavyweight

Boxing career
- Stance: Orthodox

Boxing record
- Total fights: 65
- Wins: 36 (KO 20)
- Losses: 27 (KO 8)
- Draws: 2

Wilfred Francis Greaves (7 December 1935 – 26 August 2020) was a Canadian amateur light middleweight and professional light middle/middle/light heavyweight boxer of the 1950s and '60s who as an amateur won the gold medal at light middleweight in the Boxing at the 1954 British Empire and Commonwealth Games in Vancouver, British Columbia, Canada, and as a professional won the Canada middleweight title, and British Commonwealth middleweight title, his professional fighting weight varied from 152 lb (69 kg; 10 st 12 lb), i.e. light middleweight to 164 lb (74 kg; 11 st 10 lb), i.e. light heavyweight. Wilf Greaves was managed by Jacob Mintz. Greaves died on 26 August 2020, at the age of 84.

== Boxing career ==
Greaves had his first fight against Lee Owens in Syracuse, New York ending in a draw by points.
