= Pat McAteer =

English boxer (1932–2009)

Personal information
- Nickname: PatMac
- Nationality: English
- Born: Edward Patrick McAteer; 17 March 1932 Birkenhead, England
- Died: 30 April 2009 (aged 77) Annapolis
- Weight: light middle/middle/light heavyweight

Boxing career

Boxing record
- Total fights: 57
- Wins: 49 (KO 24)
- Losses: 6 (KO 3)
- Draws: 2

Pat "PatMac" McAteer (17 March 1932 – 30 April 2009) born in Birkenhead was an English professional light middle/middle/light heavyweight boxer of the 1950s who won the British Boxing Board of Control (BBBofC) British middleweight title (between 16 June 1955 – 5 September 1957) and British Empire middleweight title (between 16 June 1955 – 27 March 1958 ) and was a challenger for the European Boxing Union (EBU) middleweight title against Charles Humez, his professional fighting weight varied from 154 lb (70 kg; 11 st 0 lb), i.e. light middleweight to 161 lb (73 kg; 11 st 7 lb), i.e. light heavyweight.

== Genealogical information ==
Pat McAteer was the younger brother of Michael J. "Mick" McAteer (birth registered October→December 1928 (age 97–98) in Birkenhead district), and the boxer William R. "Billy" McAteer (birth registered July→September 1930 (age 95–96) in Birkenhead district), the cousin of the boxer Les McAteer, and the uncle of association (soccer) footballer Jason McAteer.
