= José Luís =

José Luís may refer to:

- José Luís (footballer, born 1908), Portuguese footballer
- José Luis (footballer, born 1943), Spanish football defender
- José Luís (footballer, born 1958), Portuguese football attacking midfielder
- José Luis Díaz (footballer, born 1974), Argentine former professional footballer
- José Luis Abadín (born 1986), Spanish racing driver
- José Luis Abajo (born 1978), Spanish épée fencer
- José Luis Ábalos (born 1959), Spanish politician
- José Luis Abellán (1933–2023), Spanish philosopher
- José Luis Abilleira (born 1947), Spanish racing cyclist
- José Luis Ablanedo (born 1962), Spanish former footballer
- José Luis Aceves (born 1970), Spanish politician and environmental agent
- José Luis Acquaroni (1919–1983), Spanish writer
- José Luis Adsuar Ferrando (born 1946), Spanish politician
- José Luis Aguilera Rico (born 1979), Mexican politician
- José Luis Aguirre (born 1967), Spanish rower
- José Luis Albareda y Sezde (1828–1897), Spanish politician and journalist
- José Luis Alcaine (born 1938), Spanish cinematographer
- José Luis Alfonzo (born 1969), Argentine film actor
- José Luis Allende (1926–2015), Spanish sailor
- José Luis Alonso Berbegal (born 1927), Spanish former sports shooter
- José Luis Alonso de Santos (born 1942), Spanish dramatist
- José Luis Alvarado Nieves, real name of Brazo de Plata (1963–2021), Mexican professional wrestler
- José Luis Álvarez, several people
- Jose Luis Alves, Portuguese former footballer
- José Luis Ancalle, Peruvian lawyer and politician
- José Luis Aparisi (born 1969), Spanish former professional tennis player
- José Luis Appleyard (1927–1998), Paraguayan poet, playwright, lawyer, journalist, and publisher
- José Luis Araneda Carrasco (1848–1912), Chilean Army officer
- José Luis Arilla (born 1941), Spanish former tennis player
- José Luís Arnaut, Portuguese former politician in the Social Democratic Party (Portugal)
- José Luis Arribas Granados (born 1975), Spanish vision impaired swimmer
- José Luis Arrieta (born 1971), Spanish retired professional road racing cyclist
- José Luis Artetxe (1930–2016), Spanish footballer
- José Luis Astiazarán (born 1963), Spanish lawyer
- José Luis Astigarraga Lizarralde (1940–2017), Peruvian Roman Catholic bishop
- José Luis Asturias, 20th-century Guatemalan chess player
- José Luis Aussín (born 1942), Mexican former footballer
- José Luis Ayllón (born 1970), Spanish lawyer and politician
- José Luis Azcona Hermoso (1940–2024), Brazilian Roman Catholic prelate and bishop
- José Luis Báez, Puerto Rican politician
- José Luis Ballester, several people
- José Luis Barceló (born 1959), Colombian lawyer and academic
- José Luis Bartolilla (born 1986), Argentine singer, songwriter, and actor
- José Luis Biescas (born 1939), Spanish boxer
- José Luis Blanco (born 1975), Spanish middle-distance runner
- José Luis Blanco Pajón (born 1956), Mexican politician
- Jose Luis Blanco Vega (1928–2005), Spanish Jesuit, professor, writer, poet, and film critic
- José Luis Blasio (1842–1923), Mexican writer
- José Luis Boffi (1897–1981), Argentine footballer and manager
- José Luis Borau (1929–2012), Spanish producer, screenwriter, writer, and film director
- José Luis Borbolla (1920–2001), Mexican footballer
- José Luís Borga (born 1964), Portuguese Roman Catholic priest and Christian contemporary musician
- José Luis Borja (born 1947), Spanish former professional footballer
- José Luis Bouza, Spanish sprint canoer
- José Luis Briones Briseño (born 1963), Mexican politician
- José Luis Brown (1956–2019), Argentine footballer and coach
- José Luis Bueno (born 1969), Mexican former professional boxer
- José Luis Bustamante y Rivero (1894–1989), Peruvian lawyer, writer, politician, and diplomat
- José Luis Caballero (1955–2021), Mexican footballer
- José Luis Cabezas (1961–1997), Argentine news photographer and reporter
- José Luis Cabión (born 1983), Chilean footballer
- José Luis Cabrera, several people
- José Luis Calderón (born 1970), Argentine former professional footballer
- José Luis Calva (1969–2007), Mexican writer and serial killer
- José Luis Calvo (born 1942), Spanish former sports shooter
- José Luis Campi (born 1971), Argentine former professional footballer
- José Luis Cano (1911–1999), Spanish writer, editor, and literary critic
- José Luis Caño (born 1988), Spanish former professional road cyclist
- José Luis Cantero Rada, birth name of El Fary (1937–2007), Spanish singer and actor
- José Luis Cantilo (1871–1944), Argentine diplomat and politician
- José Luis Cardoso (born 1975), Spanish Grand Prix motorcycle road racer
- Jose Luis Carlos Almeida, Indian politician
- José Luís Carneiro (born 1971), Portuguese politician
- José Luis Carranza (born 1964), Peruvian former footballer
- José Luis Carrasco (born 1982), Spanish former professional road bicycle racer
- José Luis Carreira (born 1962), Spanish retired middle-distance runner
- José Luis Carreño (1905–1986), Spanish Roman Catholic priest
- José Luis Caso Cortines (1933–1997), Spanish politician
- José Luis Castillo (born 1973), Mexican former professional boxer
- José Luis Castillo (activist) (born 1968), Dutch-born Colombian American activist, politician, and nonprofit community liaison
- José Luis Castro Aguirre (1943–2011), Mexican ichthyologist
- José Luis Castro Medellín (1938–2020), Mexican Roman Catholic bishop
- José Luis Cazares (born 1991), Ecuadorian footballer
- José Luis Ceballos (born 1953), Argentine former professional footballer
- José Luis Cerón Ayuso (1924–2009), Spanish politician
- José Luis Cerrillo (born 1952), Mexican politician
- José Luis Chacón (born 1971), Peruvian former footballer
- José Luis Chea Urruela, Guatemalan politician
- José Luis Chunga (born 1991), Colombian professional footballer
- José Luis Clerc (born 1958), Argentine former professional tennis player
- José Luis Comellas (1929–2021), Spanish astronomer, historian, and academic
- José Luis Contreras Coeto (born 1964), Mexican politician
- José Luis Conde (1911–1992), Spanish footballer
- José Luis Corcuera (born 1944), Spanish politician
- José Luis Cordeiro (born 1962), Venezuelan-Spanish engineer, economist, futurist, and transhumanist
- José Luis Cordero (actor) (born 1948), Mexican actor, singer, and director
- José Luis Cordero (footballer) (born 1987), Costa Rican footballer
- Jose Luis Correa (born 1958), American businessman and politician
- José Luis Corripio (born 1934), Spanish-born Dominican billionaire businessman
- José Luis Corta (born 1949), Spanish rower
- José Luis Cortés, Cuban member of musical group NG La Banda
- José Luis Cortez (born 1979), Ecuadorian footballer
- José Luis Costa (1909–1986), Spanish footballer
- José Luis Cruz Cruz (born 1959), Puerto Rican politician and former mayor
- José Luis Cuciuffo (1961–2004), Argentine professional footballer
- José Luis Cuevas (1934–2017), Mexican artist, painter, writer, draftsman, engraver, illustrator, and printmaker
- José Luis Cuevas (architect) (1881–1952), Mexican architect and urban planner
- José Luis Dalmau (born 1966), Puerto Rican attorney and politician
- José Luis Damiani (born 1956), Uruguayan retired professional tennis player
- José Luis de Arrese (1905–1986), Spanish politician
- José Luis de Frutos (1949–2006), Spanish judoka
- José Luis de Jesús (1946–2013), Puerto Rican-born American cult leader
- José Luis de la Cruz (born 2000), Dominican footballer
- José Luis del Valle (1901–1983), Spanish lawyer and sports leader
- José Luis de Matos, Angolan politician
- José Luis de Mirecki Ruiz-Casaux (1922–2000), Spanish economist
- José Luis de Vilallonga, 9th Marquess of Castellbell (1920–2007), Spanish nobleman, author, socialite, and film actor
- José Luis de Villabaso (1852–1917), Spanish industrialist
- José Luis Díaz (footballer, born 1974) (born 1974), Argentine former professional footballer
- José Luis Diezma (born 1968), Spanish retired footballer and current manager
- José Luis Di Palma (born 1966), Argentine racing driver
- José Luis Dolgetta (1970–2023), Venezuelan professional footballer and manager
- José Luis Doreste (born 1956), Spanish sailor and Olympic champion
- José Luis dos Santos Pinto (born 1992), Brazilian footballer
- José Luis Ebatela Nvo (born 1972), Equatoguinean middle-distance runner
- José Luis Elejalde (1951–2018), Cuban footballer
- José Luis Elias (born 1954), Peruvian sprinter
- José Luis Elías (born 1954), Peruvian lawyer and politician
- José Luis Encarnação (born 1941), Portuguese computer scientist, professor emeritus, and senior technology- and innovation advisor
- José Luis Encinas (born 1966), Spanish guitarist
- José Luis Escañuela Romana (born 1964), Spanish former tennis president
- José Luis Escobar Alas (born 1959), Salvadoran Roman Catholic prelate and former bishop
- José Luis Escrivá (born 1960), Spanish economist and governor
- José Luis Espinosa, several people
- José Luis Esquivel Zalpa (born 1953), Mexican politician
- José Luis Estrada (1906–1976), Spanish lawyer, writer, state tax inspector, politician, and sports leader
- José Luis Fábrega (born 1962), Panamanian politician and engineer
- José Luis Falcón (born 1938), Spanish Olympic hammer thrower
- José Luis Falero (born 1966), Uruguayan businessman and politician
- José Luis Fernández (disambiguation), several people
- José Luis Flores Méndez (born 1956), Mexican politician
- José Luis Fuentes (born 1985), Venezuelan artistic gymnast
- José Luis Gago del Val (1934–2012), Spanish Dominican friar, journalist, and writer
- José Luis Gaitán (born 1957), Argentine footballer
- José Luis Gallegos (1880–1942), Spanish shipowner and commercial agent
- José Luis Gamonal (born 1989), Chilean footballer
- José Luis Garcés (born 1981), Panamanian footballer
- José Luis Garci (born 1944), Spanish film director, producer, critic, TV presenter, screenwriter, and author
- José Luis García, several people
- José Luis Garzón (1946–2017), Spanish footballer
- José Luis Gavidia (born 1958), Peruvian retired naval officer
- José Luis Gayà Peña, full name of José Gayà (born 1995), Spanish professional footballer
- José Luís Gerardo Ponce de León (born 1961), Argentine-born South African Roman Catholic prelate and bishop
- José Luis Giera (born 1985), Spanish 5-a-side football player
- José Luis Gil (born 1957), Spanish actor
- José Luis Gilarranz (1954–2009), Spanish medic
- José Luis Giménez-Frontín (1943–2008), Spanish writer and critic
- José Luis Gioja (born 1949), Argentine politician
- José Luis Gómez, several people
- José Luis González, several people
- José Luis Granados (born 1986), Venezuelan footballer
- José Luis Grasset (1901–1974), Spanish middle-distance runner
- Jose Luis Graterol (born 1986), Venezuelan past member of boy band Uff!
- José Luis Guerín (born 1960), Spanish filmmaker and educator
- José Luís Guterres (born 1954), East Timorese politician and diplomat
- José Luis Gutiérrez Calzadilla (born 1944), Mexican politician
- Jose Luis Hernandez, several people
- José Luis Inciarte, Uruguayan passenger during the Uruguayan Air Force Flight 571 accident
- José Luis Íñiguez Gámez (born 1978), Mexican politician
- José Luis Ispizua (1908–1996), Spanish footballer
- José Luis Izquierdo (born 1933), Spanish weightlifter
- José Luis Jaime Correa (born 1953), Mexican politician
- José Luis Jaimerena (born 1960), Spanish former racing cyclist and current directeur sportif
- José Luis Jair Soria, real name of Shocker (wrestler) (born 1971), Mexican retired professional wrestler
- José Luis Jerez (born 1978), Chilean former professional footballer
- José Luís Jesus (born 1950), Cape Verdean former politician
- José Luis Jiménez (born 1983), Chilean former professional footballer
- José Luis Koifman (born 1954), Chilean alpine skier
- José Luis Lacunza Maestrojuán (born 1944), Spanish-born Panamanian Roman Catholic prelate
- José Luis Lamadrid (1930–2021), Mexican professional footballer
- José Luis Leal (born 1939), Spanish politician
- Jose Luis León Perea (born 1947), Mexican politician
- José Luis Lezama (born 1952), Mexican researcher, scientist, and columnist
- José Luis Liso (1934/1935–2021), Spanish politician
- José Luis Llorente (born 1959), Spanish retired basketball player
- José Luis Lobato (1938–2014), Mexican politician
- José Luis López, several people
- José Luis Luege Tamargo (born 1953), Mexican politician and bureaucrat
- José Luis Machinea (born 1946), Argentine economist
- José Luis Madrid (1933–1999), Spanish screenwriter, producer, and film director
- José Luis Mamone (born 1982), Argentine footballer
- José Luis Mandros (born 1998), Peruvian long jumper
- José Luis Manzano (born 1956), Argentine businessman and former politician
- José Luis Marello (born 1965), Argentine sprint canoer
- José Luis Marrufo (born 1996), Venezuelan footballer
- José Luis Martí (born 1975), Spanish former professional footballer
- Jose Luis Martin Cosgayon Gascon, birth name of Chito Gascon (1964–2021), Filipino lawyer, civic organizer, and human rights activist
- José Luis Martínez, several people
- José Luis Massera (1915–2002), Uruguayan dissident and mathematician
- José Luis Mata (born 1966), Mexican football manager and former player
- Jose Luis Mateos (born 1961), Mexican theoretical physicist
- José Luis Mato Sanmartín, full name of Joselu (born 1990), Spanish professional footballer
- José Luis Mayoz (born 1954), Spanish racing cyclist
- José Luis Medina Lizalde (born 1951), Mexican politician
- José Luis Meilán Gil (1933–2018), Spanish lawyer, university professor, and politician
- José Luís Mena Barreto (1817–1879), Brazilian army officer, politician, and monarchist
- José Luís Mendes Andrade (born 1991), Cape Verdean professional footballer
- José Luís Mendes Lopes (born 1992), Bissau-Guinean professional footballer
- José Luis Mendilibar (born 1961), Spanish former professional footballer
- José Luis Mendoza Peña (born 1954), Navarrese politician
- José Luis Merino (1927–2019), Spanish film writer and director
- José Luis Meza (born 1984), Ecuadorian boxer
- José Luis Molina (born 1965), Costa Rican long-distance runner
- José Luis Molinuevo (1917–2002), Spanish football manager and player
- José Luis Mollaghan (1946–2025), Argentine Roman Catholic prelate
- José Luis Moltó (born 1975), Spanish volleyball player
- José Luis Moneró (1921–2011), Puerto Rican musician and bandleader
- José Luís Monteiro (1848–1942), Portuguese architect
- José Luis Montes (1956–2013), Spanish professional footballer and manager
- José Luis Morales, several people
- José Luis Moreno (born 1996), Colombian professional footballer
- José Luis Moreno Barroso (born 1991), Spanish former professional footballer
- José Luis Moro (1925-2015), Spanish animator known for creating Familia Telerín
- José Luis Mosquera (born 1995), Colombian professional footballer
- José Luis Munárriz (1762–1830), Spanish literary critic, translator, and writer
- José Luis Munguía (1959–1985), Salvadoran footballer
- José Luis Muñoz (born 1987), Chilean former professional footballer
- José Luis Muñoz León (born 1997), Spanish professional footballer
- José Luis Muñoz Soria (1948–2024), Mexican politician
- José Luis Munuera (born 1972), Spanish comics artist
- José Luis Munuera Montero (born 1983), Spanish football referee
- José Luis Murature (1876–1929), Argentine lawyer, journalist, professor, and foreign minister
- José Luis Naranjo y Quintana (born 1944), Mexican politician
- José Luis Narom (born 1963), German-born Spanish composer
- José Luis Navarro, several people
- Jose Luis Nazario Jr. (born 1979), American former Marine who was tried for war crimes
- José Luis Neyra (1930–2019), Mexican photographer
- José Luis Noriega (born 1969), Peruvian former professional tennis player
- José Luis Olaizola (1927–2025), Spanish writer
- José Luis Oliva Meza, Mexican former politician and current radio director
- José Luis Oliveros Usabiaga (born 1983), Mexican politician
- José Luis Oltra (born 1969), Spanish former footballer and current manager
- José Luis Orbegozo (1929–2010), Spanish businessman and sports leader
- José Luis Oriol Urigüen (1877–1972), Spanish businessman, architect, and politician
- José-Luis Orozco (born 1948), Mexican children's author, educator, and recording artist
- José Luis Ortega Mata (1964–2001), Mexican journalist and director
- Jose Luis Ortiz (born 1985), Bolivian professional footballer
- José Luis Ortiz Güell (born 1967), Spanish writer, actor, and columnist
- José Luis Ortiz Moreno (born 1967), Spanish astronomer and former vice director of technology
- José Luis Osorio (born 1980), Mexican professional footballer
- José Luis Ovando Patrón (born 1970), Mexican politician
- José Luis Palomino (born 1990), Argentine professional footballer
- José Luis Panizo (1922–1990), Spanish footballer
- José Luis Parada (born 1953), Bolivian economist and politician
- José Luis Paredes Pacho (born 1961), Mexican musician, researcher, writer, and cultural advocate
- José Luis Paris (1936–2003), Spanish musician and singer
- José Luis Partida (born 1952), Mexican former field hockey player
- José Luis Pavoni (born 1954), Argentine football coach and former player
- José Luís Peixoto (born 1974), Portuguese author, poet, and playwright
- José Luis Perales (born 1945), Spanish singer, songwriter, and producer
- José Luis Pérez, several people
- José Luis Perlaza (born 1981), Ecuadoran former footballer
- José Luis Picardo (1919–2010), Spanish architect, muralist, draughtsman, and illustrator
- José Luis Pineda (born 1975), Honduran retired professional footballer
- José Luis Pinillos Díaz (1919–2013), Spanish psychologist
- José Luis Pochettino (born 1965), Argentine retired footballer
- José Luis Ponce (born 1949), Cuban diver
- José Luis Prado (born 1956), Mexican former Olympic swimmer
- José Luis Quiñones (born 1974), Puerto Rican boxer
- José Luis Quiñónez (born 1984), Ecuadorian footballer
- José Luis Quintana (1948–2025), Cuban percussionist
- José Luis Ramírez (born 1958), Mexican former professional boxer
- José Luis Ramírez (racing driver) (born 1979), Mexican NASCAR driver
- José Luis Ramón (born 1964), Argentine lawyer and politician
- José Luis Ramos (c. 1790–1849), Venezuelan writer and political figure
- Jose Luis Ramos Escobar (born 1950), Puerto Rican writer and playwright
- José Luis Real (born 1952), Mexican former professional footballer
- José Luis Rebollo (born 1972), Spanish racing cyclist
- José Luis Rebordinos (born 1961), Spanish festival programmer
- José Luis Reséndez (born 1978), Mexican actor and model
- José Luis Ribera (born 1965), Spanish former footballer and current manager
- José Luis Riera, several people
- José Luis Rion (born 1952), Mexican rower
- Jose Luis Rivera, Puerto Rican retired professional wrestler
- José Luis Rivera Guerra (born 1973), Puerto Rican politician
- José Luis Robles (1927–2007), Spanish politician
- José Luis Rocha (born 1966), Mexican-born American diver
- José Luis Rodríguez, several people
- José Luis Rojas (born 1992), Peruvian long-distance runner
- José Luis Roldán (born 1985), Spanish former professional road racing cyclist
- Jose Luis Romanillos Vega (1932–2022), Spanish luthier, historian, and author
- José Luis Romero, several people
- José Luis Romo Martín (1954–2016), Mexican painter, sculptor, and graphic artist
- José Luis Rondo (born 1976), Spanish-born Equatoguinean former professional footballer
- José Luis Rosales (born 1943), Salvadoran former sports shooter
- José Luis Rubiera (born 1973), Spanish former professional road bicycle racer
- José Luis Rubio (born 1996), Mexican beach volleyball player
- José Luis Rugamas (born 1953), Salvadoran football manager and former professional player
- José Luis Ruiz (born 1952), Spanish long-distance runner
- José Luis Ruiz Casado (1958–2000), Spanish politician who was assassinated
- José Luis Russo (born 1958), Uruguayan former footballer
- José Luis Sáenz de Heredia (1911–1992), Spanish film director
- José Luis Salcedo Bastardo (1926–2005), Venezuelan historian and diplomat
- José Luis Saldívar (1954–2014), Mexican professional football player and coach
- José Luis Salema (born 1970), Argentine former beach volleyballer
- José Luis Salerno, Argentine crime suspect
- José Luis Sampedro (1917–2013), Spanish economist and writer
- José Luis Sánchez, several people
- José Luis Santamaría (born 1973), Spanish former footballer
- José Luis Santana (born 1989), Mexican marathon runner
- José Luis Santiago Vasconcelos (1957–2008), Mexican civil servant killed in an aviation accident
- José Luis Sanz (born 1968), Spanish politician
- José Luis Serna Alzate (1936–2014), Colombian Roman Catholic bishop
- José Luis Sérsic (1933–1993), Argentine astronomer
- José Luis Sierra, several people
- José Luis Silva (born 1991), Chilean footballer
- José Luis Silva Silva (born 1968), Venezuelan military officer
- José Luis Sinisterra (born 1998), Colombian USL player
- José Luis Soro (born 1966), Spanish politician
- José Luis Sosa (1956–2021), Uruguayan footballer
- José Luis Soto (1932–2006), Costa Rican footballer
- José Luis Soto Oseguera (born 1974), Mexican politician
- José Luis Talamillo (1933–1965), Spanish cyclist
- José Luis Tamayo (1858–1947), Ecuadorian politician
- José Luis Tancredi (born 1983), Uruguayan former footballer
- José Luis Tapia (born 1963), Mexican politician
- José Luis Tejada Sorzano (1882–1938), Bolivian economist, lawyer, and politician
- José Luis Tellez (born 1938), Mexican former cyclist
- José Luis Torregrosa (1944–2007), Spanish singer, musician, composer, and record producer
- José Luis Torres, several people
- José Luis Torrijo (born 1967), Spanish theatre-, television-, and film actor
- Jose Luis Tovar, Spanish Paralympic middle-distance runner
- José Luis Trejo (born 1951), Mexican former professional footballer and current manager
- José Luis Turina (born 1952), Spanish composer
- José Luis Ugarte (1928–2008), Spanish sailor
- José Luis Uriarte (born 1977), Chilean lawyer and politician
- José Luis Uribarri (1936–2012), Spanish television presenter and director
- José Luis Uribezubia (born 1945), Spanish former racing cyclist
- José Luis Valbuena (born 1971), Venezuelan former boxer
- José Luis Valdez (born 1998), Argentine former footballer
- Jose Luis Valenzuela, American theater- and film director and emeritus professor
- José Luis Valiente (born 1991), Spanish professional footballer
- José Luis Valle Magaña (born 1959), Mexican politician
- José Luis Varela (born 1978), Venezuelan professional boxer
- José Luis Varela Lagunas (born 1946), Mexican politician
- José Luis Vargas (born 1996), Bolivian professional footballer
- José Luis Vázquez, several people
- José Luis Vega (born 1948), Puerto Rican poet
- José Luis Vega (born 1962), Puerto Rican dancer and choreographer
- José Luis Vegar (born 1975), Spanish former footballer
- José-Luis Velador, Mexican-American professional poker player
- José Luis Velasco (born 1963), Mexican politician
- José Luis Vellon (born 1954), Puerto Rican former boxer
- José Luis Veloso (1937–2019), Spanish footballer
- José Luis Vergara Serón (born 1984), Spanish footballer
- José Luís Vidigal (born 1973), Portuguese retired footballer
- José Luis Vilela de Acuña (born 1953), Cuban chess player
- José Luis Villacañas (born 1955), Spanish political philosopher and philosophy historian
- José Luis Villagra (born 1986), Argentine former professional footballer
- José Luis Villalongo (born 1938), Puerto Rican sprinter
- José Luis Villanueva (born 1981), Chilean former footballer
- José Luis Villanueva Orihuela (born 1965), Spanish former racing cyclist
- José Luis Villar Palasí (1922–2012), Spanish politician
- José Luis Villarreal (born 1966), Argentine association football coach and former player
- José Luis Villegas Méndez (born 1976), Mexican politician
- José Luis Violeta (1941–2022), Spanish footballer
- José Luis Vizcaíno Pimental (born 1968), Dominican former MLB player
- José Luis Zabala (1898–1946), Spanish footballer
- Zé Luís (disambiguation), several people
- José Luis Zelaye (born 1978), Argentine former footballer
- José Luis Zertuche (born 1973), Mexican former professional boxer
- José Luis Zorrilla de San Martín (1891–1975), Uruguayan sculptor and painter
- José Luis Zumeta (1939–2020), Basque Spanish painter

== Fictional characters ==
- José Luis Torrente, in the Spanish dark comedy action film series Torrente, played by Santiago Segura (adult) and Eduardo García (infancy)

== See also ==
- Joselu (disambiguation), other people with the given name José Luis
- Zé Luís (disambiguation)
- José Lluis (1937–2018), Spanish Olympic basketball player and coach
