= Jose Romero =

Jose Romero or José Romero may refer to:

- José Romero y Fernández de Landa (1735–1807), Spanish naval officer
- José Romero (bullfighter) (1745–1826), Spanish bullfighter
- José Romero (baseball) (1878–?), Cuban baseball player
- José E. Romero (1897–1978), senator in the Philippines
- Jose V. Romero Jr. (1934–2018), Filipino statesman and diplomat
- José Romero Santos (born 1936), Cuban rower
- Jose Manuel Romero Moreno (born 1940), Spanish lawyer
- José Luis Romero (footballer) (born 1945), Spanish former footballer and coach
- José María Romero de Tejada (1948–2017), Spanish jurist
- José Santos Romero (born 1951), Argentine football manager and player
- Jose Luis Romero Hicks (born 1957), Mexican businessperson
- José Luis Romero (journalist) (1967–2010), Mexican radio journalist
- José Luis Vidal Romero (born 1995), Spanish footballer
- Jose Romero (Australian footballer) (born 1971), Chilean Australian rules footballer
- José Antonio Romero (born 1980), Spanish football manager
- José Romero Jiménez (born 1985), Spanish football (soccer) player
- Jose Simerilla Romero (born 1995), Argentinian-Spanish-American operatic tenor

== See also ==
- José Luis Romero (disambiguation)
- Estadio José Pachencho Romero, a soccer stadium in Maracaibo, Venezuela
