= Zé Luís (disambiguation) =

Zé Luís (born 1991), born José Luís Mendes Andrade, is a Cape Verdean football striker.

Zé Luís is a nickname for various people with the given name José Luís and may also refer to:

- Zé Luis (footballer, born 1971), born José Luis Boscolo, Brazilian football forward
- Zé Luís (footballer, born 1979), born José Luís Santos da Visitação, Brazilian football defensive midfielder
- Zé Luís (footballer, born 1989), born Luis de Sousa Pereira Vaz, Mozambican football midfielder

== See also ==
- Zé Luiz (disambiguation)
- Zé Luis Oliveira (born 1957), born José Luis Segneri Oliveira, Brazilian musician
- Zé Luís Araque (born 1975), born José Luís Alpalhão Regada Prazeres, Portuguese football midfielder
