= Nicolás Mentxaka =

Nicolás Mentxaka is the name of:

- Nicolás Mentxaka (footballer, born 1909), Spanish professional footballer, father
- Nicolás Mentxaka (footballer, born 1939), Spanish professional footballer, son
