= José Luis Romero =

José Luis Romero may refer to:

- José Luis Romero (footballer) (born 1945), Spanish footballer
- José Luis Romero (journalist) (1967–2009), Mexican journalist
- Jose Luis Romero Hicks (born 1957), Mexican private legal-, economic-, and financial consultant and managing partner
- José Luis Vidal Romero (born 1995), Spanish footballer
