= Boscolo =

Boscolo is an Italian surname. Notable people with the surname include:

- Enore Boscolo (1929–2023), Italian footballer
- Luigi Boscolo, 19th-century Italian engraver
- José Luis Boscolo (born 1971), Brazilian footballer

== See also ==
- Boscolo Hotels, an Italian hotel chain
