= Yerro =

Yerro is a surname. Notable people with the surname include:

- Joshua Yerro (born 2000), Filipino professional basketball player
- Tomás Yerro (1951–2021), Spanish writer and literary critic

== See also ==
- Estíbaliz Martínez Yerro (born 1980), Spanish rhythmic gymnast
