= Blasio =

Blasio may refer to:

- Blasius Mataranga (died in 1377), Albanian nobleman
- José Luis Blasio (1842–1923), Mexican secretary
- Blasio Vincent Ndale Esau Oriedo (1931–1966), Kenyan doctor
- Raúl Di Blasio (born 1949), Argentine pianist
- Bill de Blasio (born 1961), Mayor of New York City

== See also ==
- De Blasio (surname)
- Di Blasio
