= Zafiro =

Zafiro or Zafiros means sapphire in Spanish and may refer to:

- the zafiro Mexicano or Mexican woodnymph, a species of hummingbird found only in Mexico
- USS Zafiro, a collier that served in the United States Navy from 1898 to 1904
- the Zafiro offshore oilfield in Equatorial Guinea
- Zafiro (record label) a Spanish record label
- Los Zafiros Cuban vocal group
- Los Zafiros (Spanish band) Spanish group, one of whom was Jose Luis Paris
- Zafiro Hotels, a small hotel chain in the Spanish Balearic Islands offering 4&5 star premium hotels.
- Zafiro, a company operating from Madrid, which published games for the MSX in the 1980s.
