= Don José =

Don José may refer to:

- A character in the opera Carmen
- Don José Vidal (1763–1823), Spanish grandee and official in the Mississippi Territory
- José Antonio Yorba (1743–1825), Spanish soldier and early settler of Spanish California
- José Bernardo de Tagle y Bracho, 1st Marquis of Torre Tagle (1644–1740), Peruvian aristocrat who had high status in Spain and Peru
- José Darío Argüello (1753–1828), Spanish soldier and California pioneer, and twice governor of California
- José de San Martín (1778–1850), Argentine general and the prime leader South American independence from Spain
- Pepin Garcia CEO of Don Pepín Cigars
- José Luis Paris, the "Don Jose" of British TV and Hallmark recordings

== See also ==
- José
