= De Blasio (surname) =

De Blasio is a surname of people including:

- Antonio De Blasio (born 1955), Hungarian politician
- Bill de Blasio (born 1961), American politician
- Birgitte Freiesleben de Blasio (born 1968), Epidemiologist and biostatistician
- Abele De Blasio (1858–1945), Italian anthropologist
- Alfonso De Blasio (1849–1930), Italian politician
- Carlo de Blasio (born 1960), Italian journalist
- Filippo de Blasio (1820–1873), Italian jurist
- Giuseppe de Blasio (1892–1979), Italian journalist
- Luigi De Blasio Di Palizzi (1838–1896), Italian politician
- Mino De Blasio (1954–2010), Italian writer
- Tiberio De Blasio Di Palizzi (1827–1873), Italian politician
- Vincenzo De Blasio Di Palizzi (1839–1906), Italian politician

== See also ==
- Di Blasio
- Blasio (disambiguation)
