= Luis Cabrera =

Luis Cabrera may refer to:

- Luis Cabrera de Córdoba (1559–1623), Spanish historian
- Luis Cabrera Lobato (1876–1954), Mexican lawyer, politician and writer
- Luis Cabrera Ferrada (1888–1972), Chilean lawyer and politician
- Luis Cabrera (baseball) (1919–1977), Puerto Rican baseball player
- Luis Cabrera Negrete (fl. 1930s), Chilean politician
- Luis Cabrera Herrera (born 1955), Ecuadorian prelate of the Roman Catholic Church
- Luis Mario Cabrera (born 1956), Argentine footballer
- Luis Ángel Cabrera (born 1995), Venezuelan boxer
- Luis Cabrera (Chilean footballer) (born 1994), Chilean footballer

== See also ==
- Plaza Luis Cabrera, a public park in Col. Roma, Mexico City
- José Luis Cabrera (disambiguation)
