= Orbegozo =

Orbegozo is a Spanish surname. Notable people with the surname include:

- Efraín Orbegozo Rodríguez (1921–2006), Peruvian politician
- Kerman Orbegozo (born 1979), Spanish lawyer and politician
- Ignacio María de Orbegozo y Goicoechea (1923–1998), Peruvian doctor and Catholic bishop
- José Luis Orbegozo (1929–2010), Spanish businessman and sports leader
- Luis Alzúa Orbegozo (1856–?), Spanish doctor who was the first director of the Reina Victoria Asylum
- Matilde Orbegozo (1837–1891), Spanish poet
- Mikel Orbegozo (born 1989), Spanish footballer
- Tomás Orbegozo (born 1959), Spanish former footballer
