= José Cabrera =

José Cabrera may refer to:

== Public officials ==
- José Antonio Cabrera (1768–1820), Argentine statesman
- Manuel José Estrada Cabrera (1857–1924), Guatemalan general and president from 1898 to 1920
- José Ramón Balaguer Cabrera (born 1932), Cuban Communist Party and government official

== Sports personalities ==
- José Cabrera (baseball, born 1972), Dominican baseball player
- José Cabrera (baseball, born 2002), Dominican baseball player
- José Cabrera (basketball) (born 1921), Mexican Olympic basketball player
- José Cabrera (footballer) (born 1982), Spanish footballer
- Miguel Cabrera (full name José Miguel Cabrera Torres, born 1983), Venezuelan player in Major League Baseball
- José Cabrera (boxer) (born 1987), Mexican pugilist
- Lanchi (born 2001), born José Manuel Cabrera López, Spanish football right-back

== Others ==
- José Luis Calderón Cabrera (1922–2003), Mexican architect and academic
- Jose Benito Cabrera Cuevas (born 1963), Colombian guerrilla leader whose nom de guerre is Fabián Ramírez
- Jose Luis Cabrera (artist) (born 1984), Guatemalan-American contemporary visual artist
- José Cabrera (soldier) (1810–1844), Dominican militant and politician

== See also ==
- José Cabrera Nuclear Power Station, facility at Almonacid de Zorita, Spain
- Cabrera (surname)
