= Lizalde =

Lizalde may refer to:

- Eduardo Lizalde (born 1929), Mexican poet, academic and administrator
- Enrique Lizalde (1937–2013), Mexican film, television and theater actor
- Guillermo Márquez Lizalde (born 1961), Mexican politician
- José Luis Medina Lizalde (born 1951), Mexican politician
