= José Luis Torres =

José Luis Torres may refer to:

- José Luis Torres (journalist) (1901–1965), Argentine nationalist journalist and writer
- José Luis Torres (athlete) (1925–2019), Spanish athlete
- José Luis Torres (footballer, born 1994), Uruguayan midfielder
- José Luis Torres (footballer, born 1995), Argentine forward
- José Luis Murillo Torres (born 1957), Mexican politician
- José Luis Torres Leiva (born 1975), Chilean film director

José Luis Torres II (born 1977), martial artist, actor, known as The Latin Dragon
