= Manuel Navarro Nogueroles =

Spanish sports leader

- Born: Málaga, Spain
- Died: 1973; Alicante, Spain
- Citizenship: Spanish
- Known for: 4th President of Málaga CF

4th President of Málaga CF
- In office 1946–1950
- Preceded by: Francisco Espejo Nevot
- Succeeded by: José Luis Estrada

Manuel Navarro Nogueroles was a Spanish sports leader who served as the 4th president of Málaga CF between 1946 and 1950. During his mandate, the likes of Campanal I, Luis Urquiri, and Ricardo Zamora coached the club, and most importantly, Málaga reached the Spanish first division for the first time in 1949.

== Presidency of Málaga CF ==
=== First years ===
A lifelong fan of football and his team, Navarro Nogueroles was elected the 4th president of Málaga on 12 November 1946, thus replacing Francisco Espejo Nevot. His objectives were clear: to reach the First Division, so just a few days after becoming president, he dismissed the then coach Chales, and replaced him with Campanal I, a former Spanish international.

His first big success as Málaga's president was the signing of forward Pedro Bazán, who made his debut on 28 December 1946, and who went on to become the club's all-time top scorer with 146 official goals. Navarro Nogueroles had heard some rumours, so he went to Jaén to watch Bazán play with his own eyes, and it took only a few minutes for him to immediately offer a handful of "big bucks" to Real Jaén and secure his services. During the first two seasons, however, Málaga remained in the second division and the debts increased, something which was denounced by the old fans, and even by some of the club's directors. It was clear that Campanal's time had come to an end when the board of directors agreed to supervise his work, especially in the constitution of the team for each Sunday, being eventually replaced by Luis Urquiri, who had just achieved promotion to La Liga with Deportivo de La Coruña.

=== The 1948–49 season ===
At the beginning of the 1948–49 season, Navarro Nogueroles provided the financial support to cover the costs of the three reinforcements asked by Urquiri, Cesáreo López to play as goalkeeper, Manuel González as a defender, and Castor Elzo, a veteran who had helped him in the promotion of Coruña. During the first half of the season, Málaga averaged three goals per game, but despite this, the president decided to look for two other forwards, including Manolo Jimeno, who was introduced in a friendly match against UD Melilla. The highlight of this match was the unexpected presence of Navarro Nogueroles, who positioned himself as a photographer behind the goals to 'catch' the plays of the new Málaga player; neither before nor after, a president dedicated himself to collecting testimony of the good things that the new signing did.

Málaga finished the 1948–49 season as the team with the fewest goals conceded and only six losses on its way to promotion, which was achieved on the last matchday with a 5–1 away victory over Racing de Ferrol to finish level on points with both Real Sociedad and Granada, but ahead of the latter on head-to-head goal difference. Therefore, on 17 April 1949, Navarro Nogueroles became the first Málaga president to be promoted to the First Division of Spanish football, doing so within eight years into Málaga's existence. This promotion brought joy to the Málaga fans at the end of the 1940s, a period in which the city was still very impoverished, with many people suffering from poverty and lack of means, so the celebrations were therefore apotheotic, and at the Málaga headquarters, in Plaza de Uncibay, Navarro Nogueroles addressed a few words from a balcony to the thousands of people gathered in the square.

=== Last years ===
At the start of the following season, Navarro Nogueroles fired Urquiri with the false allegation of his financial demands, only so he could replace him with the legendary Ricardo Zamora, who did not reject the proposition because the club now belonged to the First Division. He was the president of Málaga for nearly four years until 10 May 1950, when he was replaced by José Luis Estrada.

During his presidency, Navarro Nogueroles also established Atlético Malagueño as a subsidiary team within the structure of CD Málaga; this change took place on 25 May 1948. He appointed José López Cabello as the first president of Malagueño, which began its career in the Primera Regional (Group C), with the base of players from CD Santo Tomás, a team from the Málaga regional league and who had been crowned amateur champions the previous year.
