= José Luis Riera =

José Luis Riera may refer to:

- José Luis Riera (pentathlete) (1916–1987), Spanish modern pentathlete
- José Luis Riera (footballer) (1920–1987), Spanish footballer
