= Jose Luis Blanco Vega =

Jesuit film critic (1928–2005)

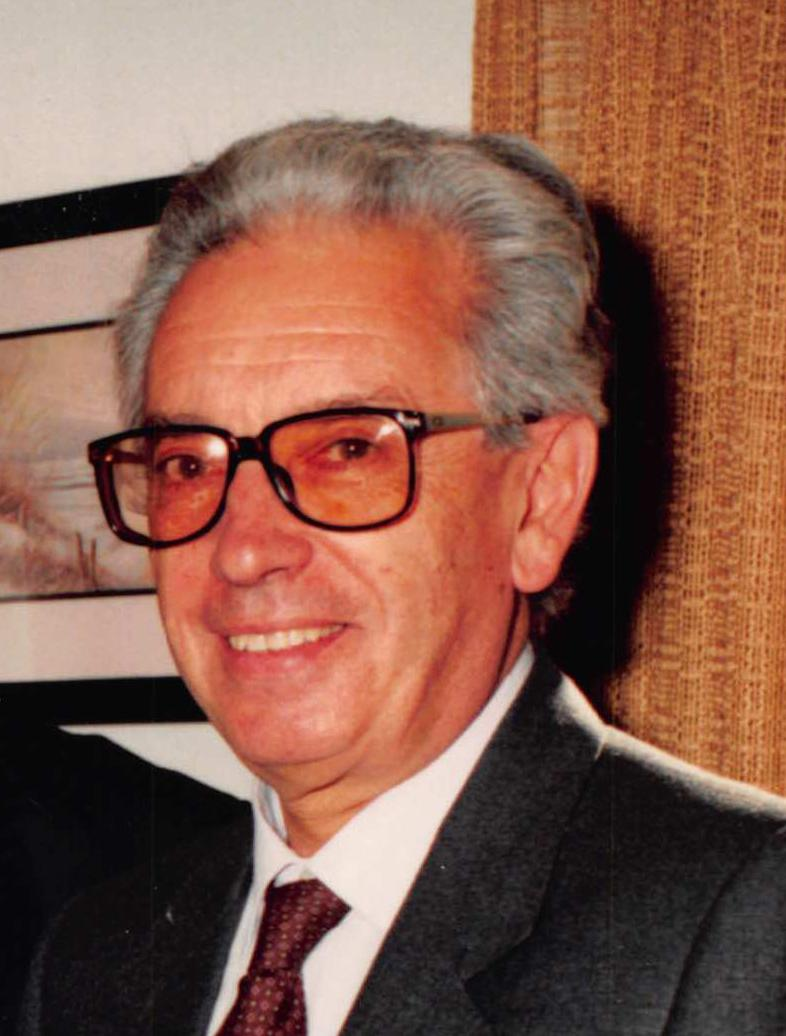
- Born: July 22, 1928; Mieres, Asturias. Spain
- Died: January 25, 2005 (aged 76); A Corunna. Galicia. Spain
- Occupations: Jesuit, professor, poet, writer, film critic
- Notable work: And I have love for the visible (poems)

Jose Luis Blanco Vega (Mieres, 22 July 1928–A Corunna, 25 January 2005) was a Jesuit, professor, writer, poet, and film critic from Asturias, Spain.

== Career ==
He joined the Society of Jesus at the age of 22 and remained a member until his death. He earned a degree in Philosophy from the Comillas Pontifical University and then he studied novitiate in Salamanca. In 1958, he moved to Granada to study theology.

Under the mentorship of biblical scholar Luis Alonso Schökel, he became a professor of literature and cinema, contributing significantly to both fields. He wrote articles and works on the relationship between cinema and education, such as Cinema in the Classroom and Cinema Stories: Learning to See. He was a regular contributor to the magazines Estría, Jesuits, and Review of Literature, Art, and Shows (Review), and was the founder of the educational journal Parents and Teachers and the annual Cinema to Read.

As a translator from Italian, he is known for translating Virgilio Fantuzzi's monograph Pier Paolo Pasolini.

Critic Tomas Yerro included Blanco Vega in the literary movement New Mester of Clergy, proposed by Florencio Martínez Ruiz, which grouped poets writing in Spanish from the second half of the 20th century.

His poems remained unpublished until 1997. He also wrote liturgical hymns.

== Works ==
- The Snail: Activities Guide (1982)
- Abraham and the Stars (1985)
- The Ballad of Ruth (1985)
- Moses, the Liberator (1986)
- Literary Style: Art and Craft (1995; co-authored with Luis Alonso Schökel and Francisco Pérez Gutiérrez)
- And I Have Love for the Visible (1997)
