= José Luis Fernández (disambiguation) =

José Luis Fernández may refer to:

- José Luis Fernández (born 1987), Argentine footballer
- José Luis Fernández Alonso (born 1959), Spanish-born Colombian botanist
- José Luis Fernández Manzanedo (born 1956), Spanish former professional footballer
- José Luis Mentxaca Fernández (born 1942), Spanish former professional footballer
- José Luis Soberanes Fernández (born 1950), Mexican lawyer

== See also ==
- Jose Luis Fernandez, American politician and candidate in the 2014 United States House of Representatives elections
