= Club Fotografico de Mexico =

Amateur photography club

The Club Fotográfico de México (English: Photographic Club of Mexico) is an amateur photography club established in the 1940s in Mexico. The club occupied a significant position in the history of photography in Mexico.

== History ==
The club's origins can be traced to World War II. It was founded as a formal entity in 1949, and soon after came to be the central organization for photographers in Mexico. In March 1949 the club had 160 members. Located at 46 Avenue Insurgentes, Mexico City, it had a photography school, darkrooms and optical equipment for members, as a well as a restaurant in its 3000 square-foot space. The club published a member's bulletin titled Boletín del Club Fotográfico de México.

José Luis Neyra was one of its notable members.
