= José Luis Gómez =

José Luis Gómez may refer to:

- José Luis Centella Gómez (born 1958), Spanish politician
- José Luis Cruz Flores Gómez (born 1957), Mexican politician
- José Luis Gómez (actor) (born 1940), Spanish actor and director
- José Luis Gómez (footballer) (born 1993), Argentine footballer
- José Luis Gómez Martínez (born 1943), Spanish professor
- José Luis Salgado Gómez (born 1966), Mexican former footballer and manager
- José Luis Viejo Gómez (1949–2014), Spanish road cyclist
- Joselu (footballer, born August 1990), born José Luis Gómez Hurtado, Spanish footballer
