= Joselu (disambiguation) =

Joselu (José Luis Mato Sanmartín, born March 1990) is a Spanish football forward.

Joselu may also refer to:

- Joselu (footballer, born 1987), (José Luis Gómez Pérez), Spanish football forward
- Joselu (footballer, born August 1990), (José Luis Gómez Hurtado), Spanish football winger
- Joselu (footballer, born 1991), (José Luis Moreno Barroso), Spanish football forward
- Joselu (footballer, born 2004), (José Luis Pérez del Amo), Spanish football forward
