= Zé Luiz =

Zé Luiz may refer to:

- Zé Luiz (footballer, born 1904), full name José Luiz de Oliveira, Brazilian football defender
- Zé Luiz (basketball) (born 1929), full name José Luiz Santos de Azevedo, Brazilian basketball player
- Zé Luiz (footballer, born 1943), full name José Luiz Pereira, Brazilian football defender
- Zé Luiz (footballer, born 1974), full name José Luiz Seabra Filho, Trinidadian football left-back

== See also ==
- Zé Luís (disambiguation)
