= Nicolás Mentxaka (footballer, born 1909) =

Spanish footballer

Personal information
- Full name: Nicolás Mentxaka Beitia
- Date of birth: 23 August 1909
- Place of birth: Getxo, Spain
- Position: Forward

Senior career*
Years	Team	Apps	(Gls)
1928–1933	Arenas	47	(17)
1933–1934	Valencia	7	(3)
Total		54	(20)
- * Club domestic league appearances and goals

Nicolás Mentxaka Beitia (born 23 August 1909) was a Spanish professional footballer who played as a forward.

== Early and personal life ==
Mentxaka was born in Getxo. His sons Nicolás and José Luis were also footballers.

== Career ==
Mentxaka played for Arenas and Valencia.
