= Zé Luís Araque =

Portuguese footballer

Personal information
- Full name: José Luís Alpalhão Regada Prazeres
- Date of birth: 15 January 1975 (age 51)
- Place of birth: Beja, Portugal
- Height: 1.78 m (5 ft 10 in)
- Position: Midfielder

Youth career
- Desportivo Beja
- –1989: Piense
- 1989–1993: Despertar Beja

Senior career*
Years	Team	Apps	(Gls)
1993–1997	Cabeça Gorda		
1997–1999	Salgueiros		
1999–2000	Fafe		
2000–2001	Campomaiorense		
2001	Ourique		
2002	Imortal		
2002–2003	Seixal		
2003–2004	Moura		
2004–2005	Fafe		
2005–2006	Desportivo Beja		
2006–2007	Torcatense		
2007–2008	Cabeceirense		
2008–2009	Mineiro Aljustrelense		
2009–2010	Piense		
2010–2012	Castrense		
2013	Desportivo Beja		
- * Club domestic league appearances and goals

José Luís Alpalhão Regada Prazeres, known as Zé Luís Araque (born 15 January 1975) is a retired Portuguese football midfielder.
