= José Luis Acquaroni =

Spanish writer

José Luis Acquaroni (1919–1983) was a Spanish writer. He was born in Madrid, although he went to Sanlúcar de Barrameda at a young age, where he spent his childhood and part of his youth.

== Work ==
His novel Copa de sombra (Shadow Cup), which received the National Book Award in the Fiction category in 1977, has, as its starting point, a list of those executed during the Spanish Civil War in "Puerto de Santa María de Humeros," imaginary place name behind which the book is hidden in the town of Sanlúcar de Barrameda. This list of those executed is taken from the diary of local historian Manuel Barbadillo. Copa de sombra, whose title comes from a poem by Antonio Machado, apart from being brilliantly written, has as its backdrop, the cruelty of war, the misery of the postwar era, the political and sexual repression in Francoist Spain and the social and economic changes of the Spanish Transition. Furthermore, open criticism of the demagoguery of politicians, postmodernism and the voracity with which it destroys the traditional identity of societies is evident.

== Awards ==
- National Fiction Prize (Ministry of Culture) in 1977 for Copa de sombra
- Golden Money Box Award in 1968 - Stories
- 1967 Blasco Ibanez Award for El turbión (The storm)
- 1955 Ateneo Prize - Short Stories
- 1954 Insula Award - Short Stories
- 1954 Camilo José Cela Prize - Stories
- 1952 Silver Award - Stories
