= José Luis Ballester =

José Luis Ballester may refer to:

- José Luis Ballester (swimmer) (born 1969), Spanish former swimmer
- José Luis Ballester (sailor) (born 1968), Spanish sailor
- José Luis Ballester (golfer) (born 2003), Spanish golfer
