= José Luis Villagra =

Argentine footballer

Personal information
- Full name: José Luis Villagra
- Date of birth: 24 February 1986 (age 40)
- Place of birth: Villa María, Argentina
- Height: 1.74 m (5 ft 9 in)
- Position: Midfielder

Senior career*
Years	Team	Apps	(Gls)
2004–2007	Newell's Old Boys	7	(0)
2008	O'Higgins	16	(0)
2009–2010	Real Arroyo Seco	20	(0)
2010–2011	La Emilia	24	(0)
2011–2012	Alumni Villa María	–	(–)
2017	Rivadavia AC	–	(–)
- * Club domestic league appearances and goals

José Luis Villagra (born 24 February 1986) is an Argentine former professional football midfielder.

== Teams ==
- (Argentina) Newell's Old Boys 2004–2007
- (Chile) O'Higgins 2008
- (Argentina) Real Arroyo Seco 2009–2010
- (Argentina) La Emilia 2010–2011
- (Argentina) Alumni de Villa María 2011–2012
- (Argentina) Rivadavia de Arroyo Cabral 2017
