= José Luis Estrada =

Spanish lawyer, writer, politician, and sports leader

- Born: José Luis Estrada Segalerva; 4 July 1906; Málaga, Spain
- Died: 23 February 1976 (aged 69); Málaga, Spain
- Citizenship: Spanish
- Known for: 4th president of Málaga CF

Mayor of Málaga
- In office 1947–1952

5th president of Málaga CF
- In office 12 June 1950 – 16 April 1952
- Preceded by: Manuel Navarro Nogueroles
- Succeeded by: Agustín Moreno García

8th president of Málaga CF
- In office 13 August 1953 – 17 March 1958
- Preceded by: Mario Canivell Freites
- Succeeded by: Julio Parres López

President of the Royal Academy of Fine Arts of San Telmo
- In office 1956–1975

José Luis Estrada Segalerva (4 July 1906 – 23 February 1976) was a Spanish lawyer, writer, state tax inspector, politician, and sports leader. Among the various positions he held are those of Procurador en Cortes, delegate of the Treasury, president of the Real Academia de Bellas Artes de San Telmo from 1956 to 1975, but he is best remembered as the mayor of Malaga from 1947 to 1952, and as the president of Spanish club Málaga CF in three different stints between 1950 and 1958.

== Professional and political career ==
José Luis Estrada was born in Málaga on 4 July 1906, as the second of three children and the only son of Luisa Segalerva (1873–1944) and José Estrada (1874–1936), a lawyer and minister of grace and justice of the government of Dámaso Berenguer. He married Josefa Pallarés Moreno.

Just like his father, Estrada became a lawyer, but also a technical fiscal inspector, or state tax inspector, and as such, he served as a delegate of the Treasury, Procurador en Cortes, and even as mayor of Malaga from 1947 to 1952.

== Sporting career ==
Estrada served as the president of Málaga CF on three occasions, first from 12 June 1950 to 16 April 1952; then from 13 August 1953 to 3 November 1955; and then from 27 June 1956 to 17 March 1958, although no one took charge of the presidency between his second and third terms.

Under his presidency, the club was coached by Ricardo Zamora, Antonio Barrios, Chales, Pasarín, Ramón Colón, and Manuel Echezarreta. With Zamora, Málaga was relegated to the Segunda División for the first time in the club's history, but with Barrios, the club returned to the elite after obtaining their first Second Division championship and, with it, their second promotion to the top category.

His presidency also saw the first player from the reserve team, Atlético Malagueño, established in 1948, to be promoted to the first team.

== Writing career ==
Estrada was also a writer and poet, and in 1952, he founded the magazine La Caracola; some sources state that he directed it until 1975, while others state that its direction was given to Fernadez Canivell. Either way, this magazine transcended the provincial scope, obtaining the collaboration of the most famous celebrities of the moment and becoming one of the best Spanish poetry magazines. He also stood out for his poetic work, with the best works of his collections of poems being Intimidad (1939); Llantos del cautiverio (1939), both about his stay in prison during the Spanish Civil War, between 1936 and 1939; Fuente de oro (1940); Corte y cortijo (1942); and "Poems of the Holy Week of Málaga" (1970), in collaboration with Baltasar Peña Hinojosa. He published his poems in numerous Spanish and American magazines.

Estrada also devoted himself to research work, focused on the recovery of the history of Malaga, in books such as the "History of Coín" (1965), carried out with Alberto Massena; and his Efemérides malagueñas (1970), published the previous year in the daily Diario Sur, which was a very important work for Malaga. He also wrote the "Catalogue of Malaga" (1973), where he compiled data, background information on positions, entities, corporations and societies of all kinds.

In 1956, Estrada was appointed as the president of the Real Academia de Bellas Artes de San Telmo, a position that he held for 19 years, until 1975. Among other decorations, he is in possession of the Grand Cross of Civil Merit.

== Death ==
Estrada died in Málaga on 23 February 1976, at the age of 69, and now has a street in that city named after him.
