= José Luis Torres (footballer, born 1994) =

Uruguayan footballer

Personal information
- Full name: José Luis Torres Torres
- Date of birth: 4 August 1994 (age 32)
- Place of birth: Miguelete, Uruguay
- Height: 1.74 m (5 ft 8 1/2 in)
- Position: Midfielder

Team information
- Current team: Club Atletico Polancos

Senior career*
Years	Team	Apps	(Gls)
2013–2015	Plaza Colonia	41	(2)
2015–2016	Progreso	10	(0)
2016–2017	Juventus		
2017–2018	Plaza Colonia	9	(0)
2026–	Club Atletico Polancos		
- * Club domestic league appearances and goals as of 19 November 2026

José Luis Torres Torres (born 4 August 1994) is a Uruguayan footballer who plays as a midfielder for Club Atletico Polancos.

== Career ==
Torres' senior career started with Plaza Colonia. He made his professional debut in a Uruguayan Segunda División match with Deportivo Maldonado on 12 October 2013, prior to netting his first goals in a 3–1 win over Progreso in the following November. Torres remained for both the 2013–14 and 2014–15 seasons, before departing in November 2015 to Progreso. He was sent off in his penultimate appearance against Huracán on 21 May 2016. Two months later, on 13 July, Torres joined Nicaraguan Primera División side Juventus. He returned to Uruguay in 2017, rejoining Plaza Colonia. Torres left at the end of 2018 after nine appearances.

== Career statistics ==
As of 12 December 2018.

Club statistics
Club	Season	League			Cup		League Cup		Continental		Other		Total	
Club	Season	Division	Apps	Goals	Apps	Goals	Apps	Goals	Apps	Goals	Apps	Goals	Apps	Goals
Plaza Colonia	2013–14	Segunda División	21	2	—		—		—		4 (Note: Four appearances in the 2013–14 Segunda División play-offs)	2 (Note: Two goals in the 2013–14 Segunda División play-offs)	25	4
Plaza Colonia	2014–15	Segunda División	20	0	—		—		—		0	0	20	0
Plaza Colonia	Total		41	2	—		—		—		4	2	45	4
Progreso	2015–16	Segunda División	10	0	—		—		—		0	0	10	0
Plaza Colonia	2017	Primera División	0	0	—		—		—		0	0	0	0
Plaza Colonia	2018	Segunda División	9	0	—		—		—		0	0	9	0
Plaza Colonia	Total		9	0	—		—		—		0	0	9	0
Career total			60	2	—		—		—		4	2	64	4
