= José Luis Gamonal =

Chilean footballer (born 1989)

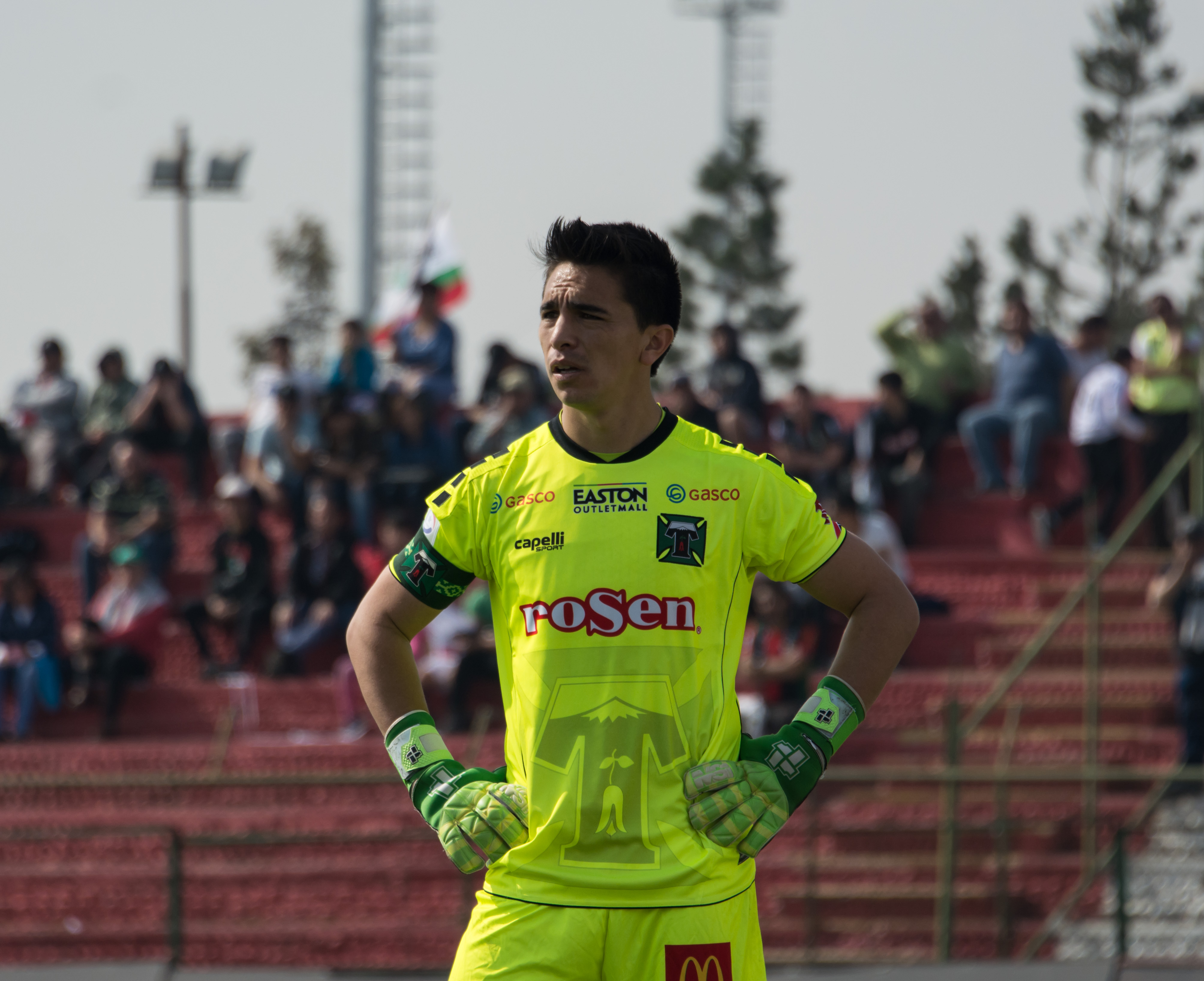
- Gamonal with Deportes Temuco in 2018

Personal information
- Full name: Jose Luis Gamonal Ruiz
- Date of birth: 9 October 1989 (age 37)
- Place of birth: Temuco, Chile
- Height: 1.79 m (5 ft 10 in)
- Position: Goalkeeper

Team information
- Current team: Rangers
- Number: 25

Youth career
- Escuela de Fútbol Rosen
- 2002–2007: Deportes Temuco

Senior career*
Years	Team	Apps	(Gls)
2007–2009	Deportes Temuco	–	(–)
2010–2013	Iberia	–	(–)
2011–2013	Unión Temuco	6	(0)
2013–2020	Deportes Temuco	151	(0)
2021	Cobresal	0	(0)
2022	Fernández Vial	25	(0)
2023	Marsaxlokk	2	(0)
2023	Trasandino	8	(0)
2024–	Rangers	0	(0)
- * Club domestic league appearances and goals as of 28 December 2023

Jose Luis Gamonal Ruiz (born 9 October 1989) is a Chilean footballer who plays as a goalkeeper for Rangers de Talca.

== Career ==
Gamonal was with Escuela de Fútbol Rosen before joining the Deportes Temuco youth system at the age of twelve. He made his debut in 2007 and played for them until 2009 in the Tercera División.

After, he played for Iberia, Unión Temuco, Deportes Temuco again, Cobresal and Fernández Vial until 2022.

In January 2023, he moved abroad and joined Marsaxlokk in the Maltese Premier League.

Back in Chile, he joined Trasandino. For the 2024 season, he signed with Rangers de Talca.
