= José Luis Sánchez =

José Luis Sánchez may refer to:

- José Luis Armenteros Sánchez (1943–2016), Spanish musician and composer
- José Luis Chávez Sánchez (born 1984), Bolivian footballer
- José Luis Sánchez Capdevila (born 1981), Spanish former footballer
- José Luis Sánchez Paraíso (José Luis Sánchez Paraíso, 1942–2017), Spanish sprinter
- José Sánchez del Río (José Luis Sánchez del Río, 1913–1928), Mexican boy martyr and blessed
- José Luis Sánchez (Argentine footballer) (José Luis "Garrafa" Sánchez, 1974–2006), Argentine football midfielder
- José Luis Sánchez Fernández (José Luis Sánchez Fernández, 1926–2018), Spanish sculptor
- José Luis Sánchez (Chilean footballer) (José Luis Sánchez Moretti, born 1970), Chilean football forward
- José Luis Sánchez (sport shooter) (José Luis Sánchez Castillo, born 1987), Mexican sport shooter
