= José Luis Bartolilla =

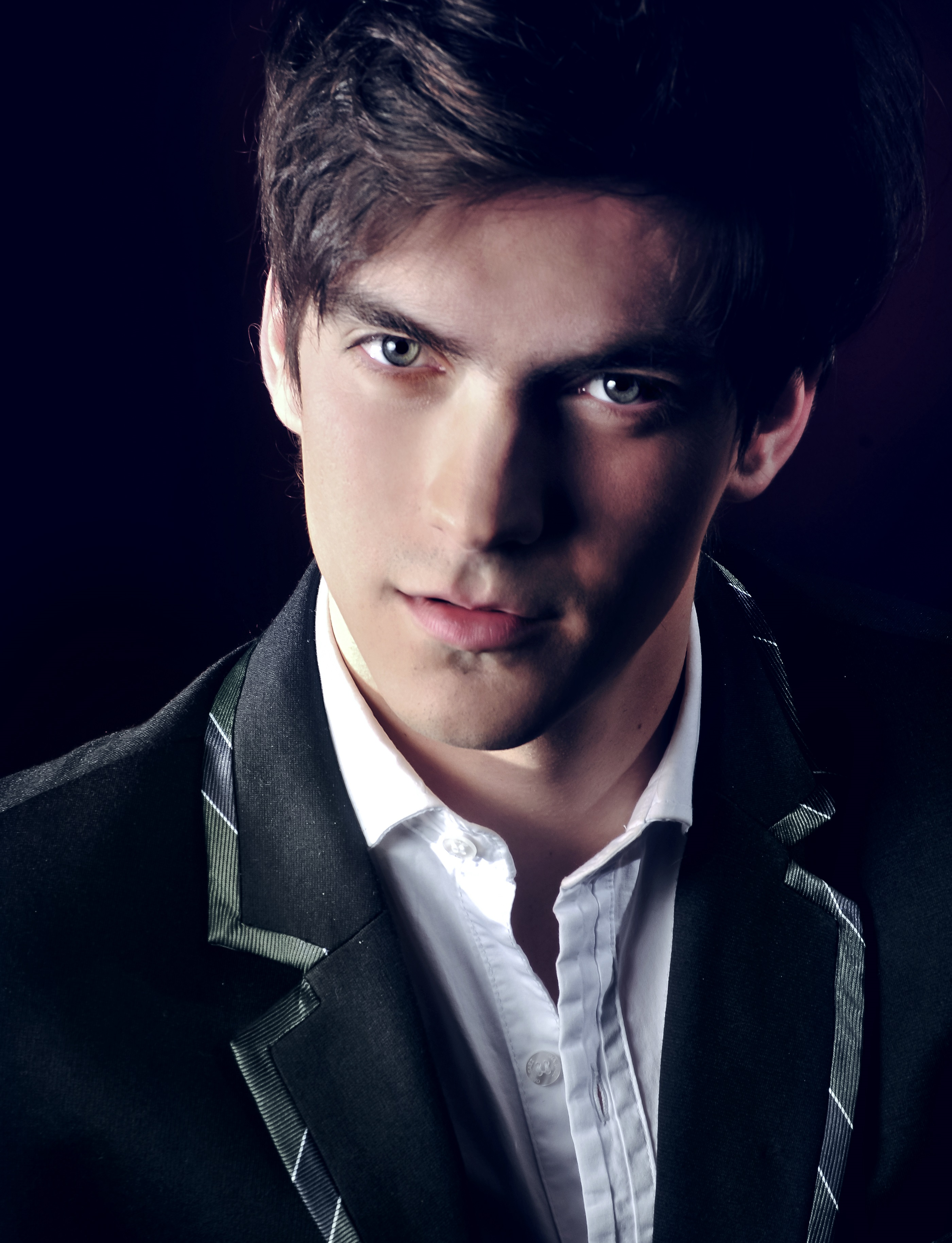
- José Luis Bartolilla by Fuentes2Fernandez Fotografía

Background information
- Birth name: José Luis Bartolilla
- Born: November 9, 1986 (age 38); Córdoba, Argentina
- Genres: Crooner, Latin pop, traditional pop, Latin
- Occupation(s): Singer, songwriter, actor, author
- Instrument: Vocals
- Years active: 2004–present
- Website: www.jlbartolilla.com.ar

José Luis Bartolilla (born November 9, 1986, in Córdoba, Argentina) is an Argentinian singer, songwriter and actor. Bartolilla began his career at age 17 with the Argentinian pop group El Agite in Córdoba. He moved to Buenos Aires in 2008 and became a musical theatre performer. He was one of the top two finalists on El Puma Rodriguez´s team on the first season of La Voz Argentina in 2012.

== Discography ==
- 2013 – José Luis Bartolilla, Uno&Uno en vivo

== Tours and shows ==
- 2013 – Uno&Uno – Buenos Aires and Córdoba, Argentina
- 2014 – Canto Versos – Buenos Aires, Argentina
- 2014 – Mi Buenos Aires Querido – Ayuntamiento de Córdoba, Andalusia, Spain

== Television ==
- 2004 – Telemanías – Teleocho – Córdoba, Argentina
- 2005 – Telemanías – Teleocho – Córdoba, Argentina
- 2012 – The Voice Argentina – Telefé – Argentina

== Theatre ==
- 2008 – Contacto Flamenco – Real Theatre, Córdoba and summer season Carlos Paz, Argentina
- 2009 – Otelo / Cibrián-Mahler, El Nacional Theatre and National Tour – Argentina
- 2010 – El Ratón Perez / Cibrián-Mahler, Astral Theatre – Buenos Aires, Argentina
- 2010 – One Thousand and One Nights / Cibrián-Mahler, El Nacional Theatre – Buenos Aires, Argentina
- 2010 – Juicio a lo Natural / Nicolás Perez Costa, El Cubo Theatre – Buenos Aires, Argentina
- 2010 – Wojtyla / Kotliar-Garabal-Mahler – Ecuador Tour
- 2011 – Un Cuento Enredoso – Salta and Jujuy, Argentina
- 2011 – El Rey y el Mago – Salta and Jujuy, Argentina
- 2011 – Casualidad, el musical / Carla Liguori, Viejo Mercado Theatre – Buenos Aires, Argentina
- 2011 – Caos en Zugarramurdi / Nicolas Bertolotto, TTM Theatre – Buenos Aires, Argentina
- 2011 – Les Misérables in Concert – La Comedia Theatre – Buenos Aires, Argentina
- 2012 – El Príncipe Feliz – Auditorio Losada – Buenos Aires, Argentina
- 2012 – Next to Normal / Brian Yorkey-Tom Kitt – Liceo Theatre and Apolo Theatre – Buenos Aires, Argentina
- 2013 – Man's Search for Meaning – Buenos Aires, Argentina
- 2013 – Hombres de la Independencia – Buenos Aires, Argentina
- 2013 – The Three Musketeers – Ciudad de las Artes Theatre – Córdoba, Argentina
- 2013 – Un Cuento en Concierto / El Cubo Theatre – Buenos Aires, Argentina
- 2014 – Pasos de Amor / El Nacional Theatre – Buenos Aires, Argentina
- 2014 – The Three Musketeers – Real Theatre – Córdoba, Argentina
- 2015 – The Three Musketeers – La Comedia Theatre – Buenos Aires, Argentina
- 2015 – Mi Banda Sonora – Ciudad de las Artes Theatre – Córdoba, Argentina
- 2016 – Te quiero hasta la Luna – Córdoba, Argentina
- 2016 – Mi Banda Sonora – Ciudad de las Artes Theatre – Córdoba, Argentina
- 2017 – Mi Banda Sonora – Ciudad de las Artes Theatre – Córdoba, Argentina
- 2018 – Razones para Dejarme – Córdoba, Argentina

== Records and achievements ==
- 2013 – Honorary Citizen of Jesús María, Córdoba, Argentina – Pio León 2013 award to honor his contributions to the arts.
- 2014 – One of Billboard´s 14 Artists to Watch in 2014 in Argentina
