= José Luis Neyra =

Mexican photographer (1930–2019)

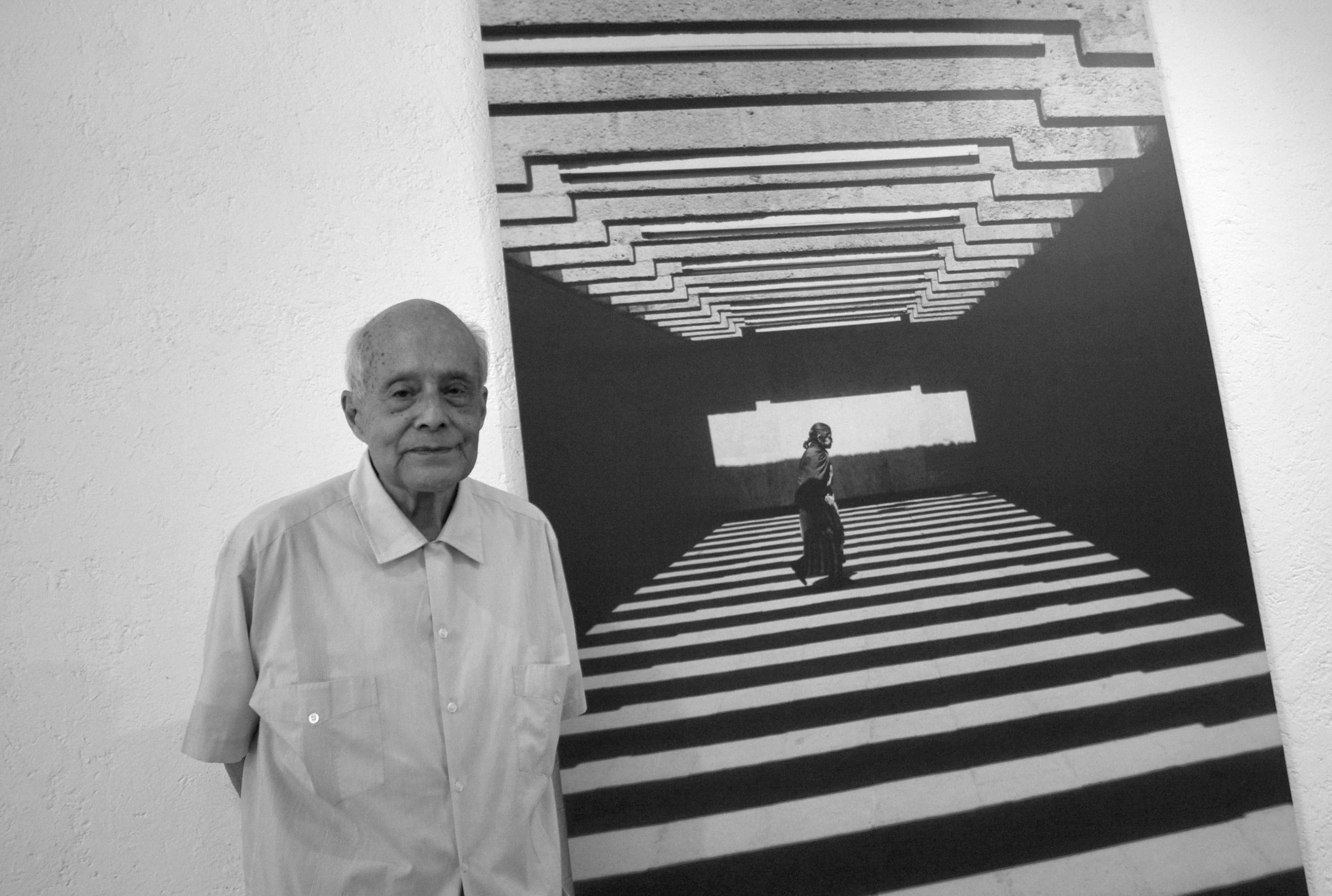
- Born: July 9, 1930; Federal District of Mexico
- Died: November 6, 2019 (aged 89)
- Known for: Photography

José Luis Neyra (July 9, 1930 – November 6, 2019) was a Mexican photographer.

== Early life and career ==
José Luis Neyra was born in 1930 in the Former Federal District of Mexico. Neyra (1930- 2019) was a Mexican photographer who devoted the majority of his career capturing the presence and day to day lives of people. He was a self taught photographer, but began working as a professional photographer in 1961.His admission into the Club Fotografico de Mexico in 1963, was his official and proper start of his profession. He wanted to prove that by photographing the human presence, the individual photographed becomes the protagonist of the photo itself, which tells the viewers a story that goes beyond a photo's visual aspect. Neyra believes that being able to encapsulate the world within an image is significant and defines what photography is about. In Neyra's photography, we see how he is able to portray his belief, he does so by photographing the subject in action and in the moment. Because of this, Neyra's work is labeled as "Spontaneous Photography," acting in the moment and waiting for the right moment in order to get his lucky shot.

Most of his photography is in black and white.Most of his photography is in black and white.

José Luis Neyra explored many themes through his photography: happiness, sadness, defeat, love, hope, nostalgia, age, struggle, dedication, religion, and pollution among others.

“Metáforas” was one of José Luis Neyra's famous exhibitions and most recent exhibitions that was displayed in the Museo de Archivo de la Fotografía (Photography Archive museum) in 2012 and remained opened until 2014. Metáforas was a remembrance and an encomium of Neyra's career. The exhibition had 400 images total which captured the day to day lives of people in Mexico during the 60's, 70's, and 80's. It was basically like visiting a part of Mexico that is no longer there. The exhibition included what Neyra called "Short Stories," which were his photographs that were shown with noise in the background, the noises were environmental sounds or music which helped narrate the setting. What was impressive about his spontaneous work in this exhibition is that he obtained photos with amazing artistic compositions and great lighting. These photos were taken and produced by Neyra using traditional techniques, lacking technology, yet surpassing their time, serving as an example for many photographers decades later.

== Accomplishments ==
Neyra has been acknowledged by many institutions and has won many awards such as being recognized by The National Institute of Fine arts and Literature (INBAL)1976, He won the prize of the selection jury for the First International Photography contest, Venezuela in 1979, He was rewarded the first Photography Biennial in 1980, was Presented the Medal of Photographic Merit at the National Institute of Anthropology and History INAH, as well as The Ministry of Culture for his unpremeditated photography. the elegance behind an unexpected photo is what makes his photography great. His work has been displayed in multiple museums and galleries, for instance, some of the places that have exhibited Neyra's work have been, Casa del Lago, Carrillo Gil Art Museum, Mexico City, Palacio de Bellas Artes Museum, Mexico City, the Meridian International Center, Washington DC, the Nexus Gallery, Atlanta the Museum of Fine Arts Houston, and the Rijksmuseum, Amsterdam.

His death on November 6, 2019, was announced by the Mexican minister of Culture.
