= José Luis Riera (pentathlete) =

Spanish modern pentathlete

Personal information
- Full name: José Luis Riera Cavaller
- Born: 30 September 1916
- Died: 1987 (aged 70–71)

Sport
- Sport: Modern pentathlon

José Luis Riera (30 September 1916 – 1987) was a Spanish modern pentathlete. He competed at the 1948 Summer Olympics.
