= Nicolás Mentxaka (footballer, born 1939) =

Spanish footballer

Personal information
- Full name: Nicolás Mentxaka Fernández
- Date of birth: 11 January 1939
- Place of birth: Bilbao, Spain
- Date of death: 10 March 2014 (aged 75)
- Height: 1.72 m (5 ft 7 1/2 in)
- Position: Forward

Senior career*
Years	Team	Apps	(Gls)
–1960	Barakaldo		
1960–1965	Athletic Bilbao	26	(10)
–	→ Ferrol (loan)		
1961–1962	→ Basconia (loan)	11	(4)
1965–1966	Barakaldo	11	(4)
1966	Lleida	0	(0)
1966–1967	Burgos	27	(5)
Total		63	(23)
- * Club domestic league appearances and goals

Nicolás Mentxaka Fernández (11 January 1939 – 10 March 2014) was a Spanish professional footballer who played as a forward.

== Early and personal life ==
Mentxaka was born in Bilbao; his father Nicolás and brother José Luis were also footballers.

== Career ==
Mentxaka played for Athletic Bilbao, Basconia, Barakaldo, Lleida and Burgos.

Mentxaka signed for Athletic Bilbao from Segunda División side Barakaldo in the summer of 1960, and made his La Liga debut against Real Valladolid on 29 September 1960. Athletic sent him on loan spells at Racing Ferrol and Basconia before he settled with the club and made 29 official appearances and scored 11 goals before leaving in 1965. Mentxaka returned to Barakaldo before finishing his career with Burgos in 1967.
