= José Luis Cabrera =

José Luis Cabrera may refer to:

- José Luis Cabrera (1767–1837), one of the signatories of the Venezuelan Declaration of Independence
- José Luis Cabrera Cava (born 1982), Spanish footballer who played as a defensive midfielder
- Jose Luis Cabrera (artist) (born 1984), American artist
- José Luis Cabrera Padilla (born 1956), Mexican politician
- José Luis Calderón Cabrera (1924–2004), Mexican architect
