= José Luis Mamone =

Argentine footballer

Personal information
- Full name: José Luis Mamone
- Date of birth: 25 November 1982 (age 43)
- Place of birth: Mar del Plata, Argentina
- Height: 1.82 m (6 ft 0 in)
- Position: Centre back

Team information
- Current team: Zofingen (playing assistant)

Youth career
- 2000–2004: San Lorenzo

Senior career*
| Years | Team | Apps | (Gls) |
| 2004–2005 | Banfield Mar del Plata | 8 | (0) |
| 2006–2007 | Luzern | 24 | (0) |
| 2007–2012 | Wohlen | 86 | (1) |
| 2012–2013 | FC Muri | 14 | (0) |
| 2013–2015 | Schötz | 38 | (0) |
| 2016– | Zofingen | 43 | (4) |

Managerial career
- 2017–: SC Zofingen (playing assistant)
- * Club domestic league appearances and goals as of 3 June 2017

José Luis Mamone (born November 25, 1982) is a footballer from Argentina who plays as a defender. He is currently working both as a player and assistant coach for Zofingen of the 1. Liga Classic in Switzerland.

== Career ==
He started his football career in the youth system of San Lorenzo, before moving on to Banfield de Mar del Plata on a free transfer. After one season there he was picked up by FC Luzern.

== Honours ==
- Challenge League champions: 2006
