= Birgitte Freiesleben de Blasio =

Epidemiologist and biostatistician (born 1968)

Birgitte Freiesleben de Blasio (born 1968) is an epidemiologist and biostatistician whose research concerns the use of mathematical models and social network analysis to understand the spread of infectious diseases. She was educated in Denmark, and works in Norway as professor II at the University of Oslo and as a department director of the Norwegian Institute of Public Health.

== Education and career ==
Freiesleben de Blasio received a master's degree in 1997 through the Niels Bohr Institute of the University of Copenhagen, and continued there for a 2002 Ph.D.

She has worked for the University of Oslo since 2002. There, she is professor II for statistical learning in molecular medicine in the Institute of Basic Medical Sciences and Faculty of Medicine, and heads a research group on infectious diseases. At the Norwegian Institute of Public Health, she is department director in the Division for Infection Control.

== Recognition ==
Freiesleben de Blasio was elected to the Norwegian Academy of Science and Letters in 2021.

She received a knighthood in the Order of the Star of Italy in 2022, from the ambassador of Italy to Norway.
