= José Luis Morales =

José Luis Morales may refer to:

- José Luis Morales (rower) (born 1950), Mexican Olympic rower
- José Luis Morales (footballer, born 1973), Spanish retired football forward
- José Luis Morales (footballer, born 1987), Spanish football winger for Levante
