= José Luis Encinas =

Spanish guitarist

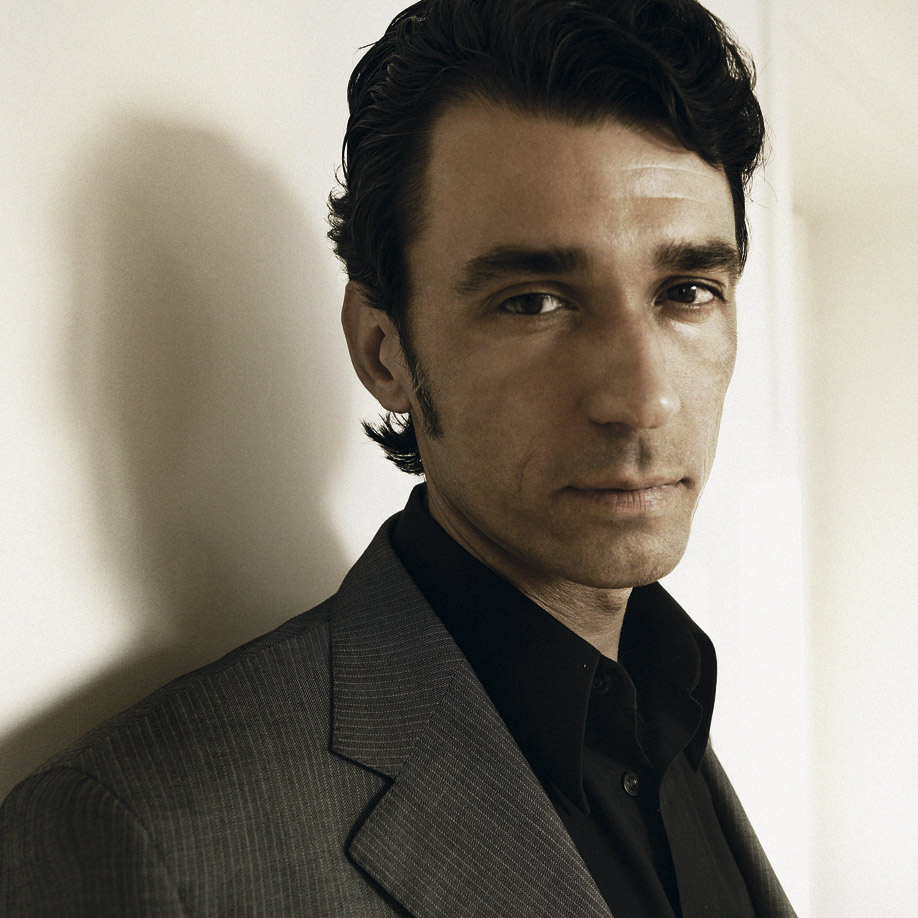
- Guitarist

Background information
- Born: 1966 (age 59–60); Palencia, Spain
- Origin: Madrid, Spain
- Genres: New flamenco, instrumental, jazz, world, Spanish guitar
- Occupations: Musician, guitarist, composer
- Instrument: Guitar
- Years active: 1995–present
- Labels: Virgin, Narada, Iberautor, EMI Music, Nuba
- Website: encinasguitarra.com

José Luis Encinas (b. 1966 in Palencia, Spain) is a guitarist. His family settled in Salamanca.

== Early life ==
He began playing guitar at age 13.

== Career ==
In 1997 he released Duende, his debut album. It became a gold record in Spain, and was released in the United States by Narada Records. Over 100,000 copies were sold.

== Discography ==
- Duende (1997)
- Aurora (1999)
- Remolino (2000)
- Guitarra Romántica (2001)
- Travesura (2003)
- Guitarras en Shanghai (2004)
- La Herida Lenta (2006)
- Guitarras y Lobos (2010); CD and DVD
- El lenguaje de los árboles (2019)

== Compilations ==
- Gypsy Soul: New Flamenco (1998) (Narada)
- Obsession: New Flamenco Romance (1999) (Narada)
- Global Transmissions (2000) (Narada)
- Gypsy Fire (2000) (Narada)
- Tabu: Mondo Flamenco (2001) (Narada)
- Best of Narada New Flamenco Guitar (2003) (Narada)
- Barcelona: Music Celebrating the Flavors of the World (2004) (Williams Sonoma)
- The World of the Spanish Guitar Vol. 1 (2011) (Higher Octave Music)

== See also ==
- New Flamenco
- Flamenco rumba
