= José Luis Ortiz Güell =

Spanish writer and columnist

- Güell in 2025
- Born: July 11, 1967 (age 59); Zaragoza, Spain
- Occupations: Writer, poet, actor, columnist
- Known for: Literature, performing arts

José Luis Ortiz Güell (born July 11, 1967, Zaragoza) is a Spanish writer, poet, actor, and columnist.

== Biography ==
José Luis Ortiz Güell was born in Spain. From an early age, he showed interest in literature, theater, and artistic creation. Over the years, he has pursued a career combining literary writing with active participation in cultural and performing arts projects. Ortiz Güell's literary work primarily includes poetry, short stories, and journalistic contributions. His writing often explores human experience, artistic sensitivity, and reflections on contemporary society.

== Publications ==
- Soledad: querida dictadura, published under the pseudonym Paolo Da Santos
- Puente en la niebla
- Canto Planetario: Hermandad en la Tierra by Carlos Jarquín
- Antología del Bicentenario de Centroamérica

== Awards and recognitions ==
- 2023 César Vallejo World Excellence Award for journalism
- 2024 César Vallejo World Excellence Award for literature
