= José Luis Gago del Val =

Spanish Dominican friar

Servant of God José Luis Gago del Val OP
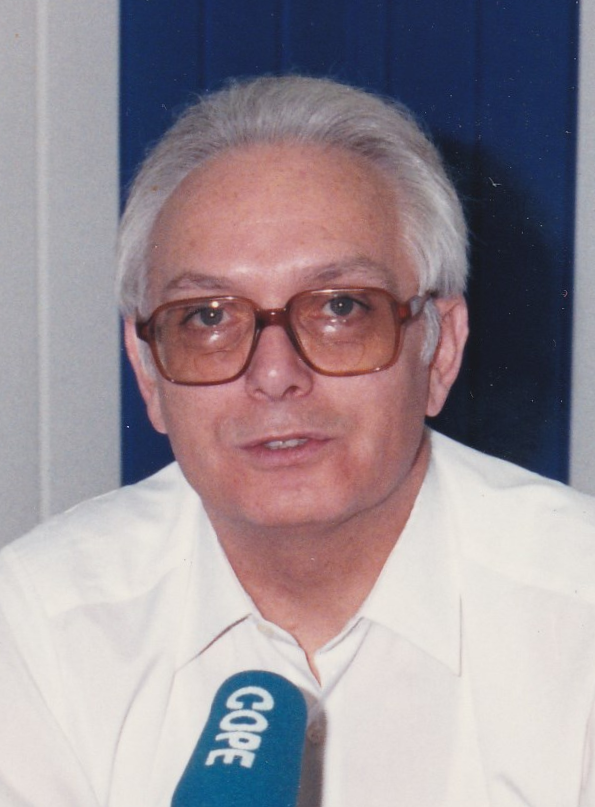
- Born: 4 July 1934; Palencia, Spain
- Died: 22 December 2012 (aged 78); Valladolid, Spain

José Luis Gago del Val, OP (4 July 1934 – 22 December 2012) was a Spanish Dominican friar, journalist and writer. He was one of the founders and directors of Cadena COPE, where he made highly rated and socially influential programmes, such as La linterna and La mañana. He also collaborated with other written and audiovisual media, such as the newspaper ABC, the magazine Ecclesia and the channel Trece.

In March 2021, his cause for beatification has been initiated, granting him the title "Servant of God". In Spain, he is called "the saint of radio".

== Biography ==
=== Early life ===
Gago was born on 4 July 1934 in Palencia. At the age of 10, he surprised his parents by expressing his desire to become a Dominican friar. His parents eventually supported him, letting him train at the monastery of Corias in altar serving, music and studies.

=== Religious life and career ===
At the age of nineteen, Gago entered the Dominican novitiate. He took the Dominican habit in 1950 and was ordained a priest eight years later. There he demonstrated his entrepreneurial character and his media vocation. He created a radio academy for students, and in La voz de Palencia he established the space for thought Dominus tecum for the closing of broadcasts.

At the age of 30, he was sent to Pamplona to direct Radio Popular. As Gago would do in Valladolid, he transformed the station into a generalist, modern and attractive channel. He received the first Ondas Prize, and, for the first time on Spanish radio, he broadcast the San Fermín bull runs live and started the Madrugá procession.

In the late 1970s, after studying journalism at the University of Navarra, Gago faced his toughest and most outstanding professional stage. He implemented Informativo Día, the first for all of COPE, just months after removing the obligation to connect to RNE. The chain was still a collection of disjointed stations, with empty coffers and technically archaic. Bernardo Herráez, a biologist with great management skills, took up the battle that Gago had to fight as general director. The Basque stations rebelled against the ministerial mandate for integration. In Catalonia, it barely had any radio licenses, and in Madrid the frequency was so weak that it was difficult to hear.

At COPE he implemented a modern socio-religious programme, with Faustino Catalina, Eva Galvache, María Eugenia Díaz and Pepe Blanco. He focused on emigration, women, ecology and education. He considered radio to be an ideal medium for "not locking up the great Message in the sacristy". He also took charge of TVE's religious programming with Julián del Olmo.

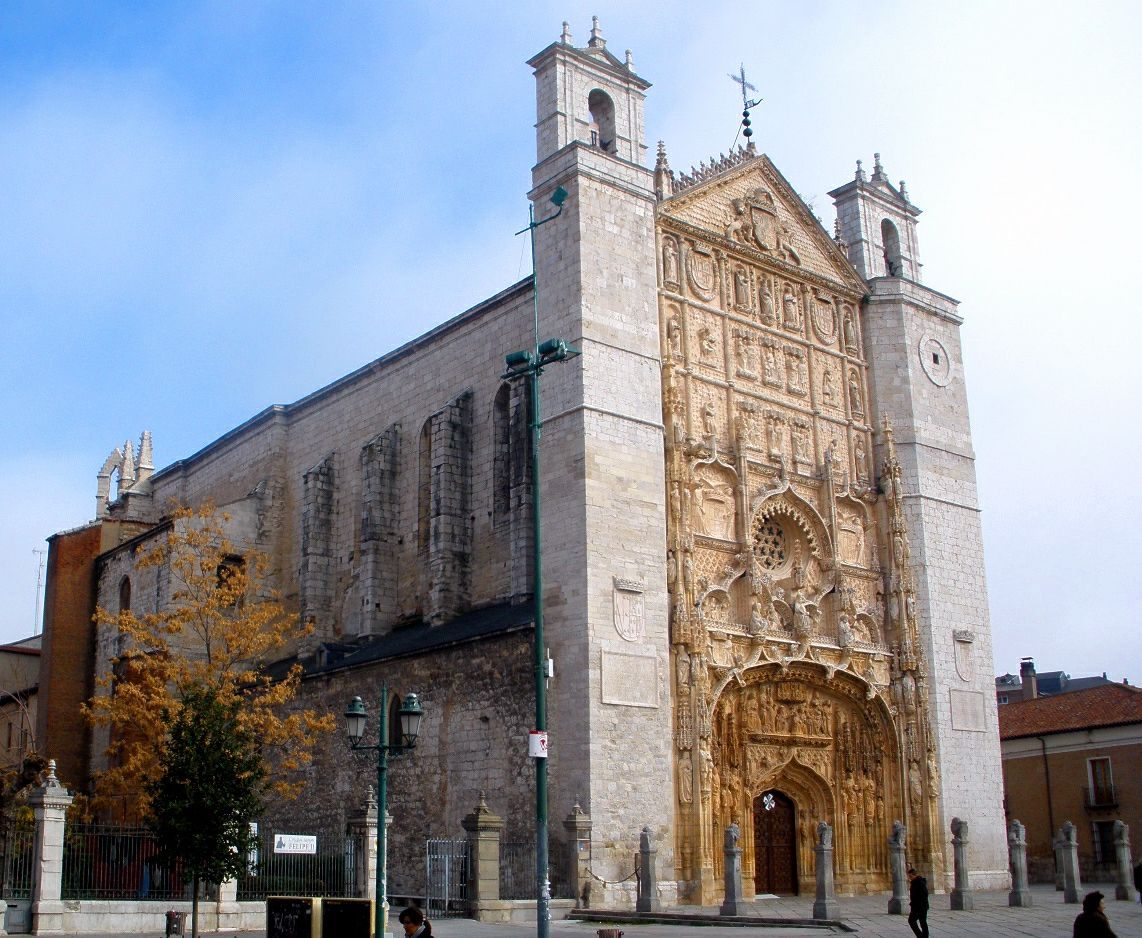
Iglesia de San Pablo in Valladolid.

=== Death ===
Gago died on 22 December 2012, at the age of 78, after a long illness. He was suffering from multiple myeloma that ate away at his bones since 2008. When he was dying, his last words were: "Do not cry, all joy and happiness." He was interred in the Cementerio del Carmen in Valladolid.

On 23 May 2023, Gago's remains were transferred to Iglesia de San Pablo in Valladolid, . They were placed in the chapel of the Blessed Sacrament inside the Church. The transfer took place in the presence of the Archbishop of Valladolid, Luis Argüello, who was accompanied by the Provincial of the Dominicans, Fray Jesús Díaz Sariego, and the Prior of the Church of San Pablo, Fray Carmelo Preciado.

== Veneration ==
On 22 March 2021, after a decade since Gago's death, the Dicastery for the Causes of Saints gave the Roman Catholic Archdiocese of Valladolid the rescript of "nihil obstat" to initiate his beatification process. On 19 June 2021, the diocesan inventigation was opened by Archbishop Ricardo Blázquez, in which he noted: "The beatification process will move forward because there is evidence of his saintliness."
