= José Luis Álvarez =

José Luis Álvarez can refer to:

- José Luis Álvarez (artist) (1917–2012), Guatemalan artist
- José Luis Álvarez (fencer) (born 1969), Spanish fencer
- José Luis Álvarez (footballer) (1960–2026), Chilean footballer
- José Luis Álvarez (politician) (1930–2023), Spanish politician
- José Luis Álvarez (rower) (born 1943), Mexican rower
- José Luis Álvarez de Castro (1918–2021), Spanish politician
- José Luis Álvarez Enparantza, real name of Txillardegi (1929–2012), Basque linguist, politician, and writer
- José Luis Álvarez Martínez (born 1968), Mexican politician
