= José Luis Giménez-Frontín =

José Luis Giménez-Frontín (1943 – 21 December 2008) was a Spanish writer and critic.

== Biography ==
From a family with Aragonese and La Mancha roots, he was born in Barcelona, although he always considered himself to be from La Mancha. He studied Law and, after a brief period as an assistant professor, joined the publishing house Kairós, owned by Salvador Pániker, as director of publications. There he published authors from the 1960s counterculture and controversial texts by Terenci Moix, as well as The Eight Names of Picasso by Rafael Alberti, the first book by the Cádiz-born author to appear in Spain after 1939. His poetic work is that of an independent. There is social awareness, participation in the fight against the dictatorship, the demand for a new way of understanding freedom and a final and growing spiritual concern, which did not ignore collective misfortunes. He was married to Pilar Brea . He had a son, Daniel, from his first marriage to Maria-Luisa Feliu and three grandchildren, Max, Léo and Oscar.

== Works ==
=== Poetry ===
- La Sagrada Familia y otros poemas, B., Lumen, 1972.
- Amor Omnia y otros poemas, B., Ambito, 1976.
- Las voces de Laye, M., Hiperión, 1981. (Premio Ciudad de Barcelona)
- El largo adiós, B., Taifa, 1985.
- Que no muera ese instante, B., Lumen, 1993.
- Astrolabio (Antología 1972-1988). 1999.
- El ensayo del organista. 1999
- Zona Cero. 2003
- La ruta de Occitania. Poesía reunida (1972-2006), Igitur, 2006.
- Requiem de las esferas. 2006
- Tres elegías, La Torre degli Arabeschi, 2007.

=== Memoirs ===
- Costa Brava, 1976.
- Woodstock Road en julio. Notas y diario (1996).
- Los años contados (2008).

=== Narrative ===
- Un día de campo. 1974
- El idiota enamorado. 1982
- El carro del heno. 1987
- Justos y benéficos. 1988
- Señorear la tierra. 1991.
- La otra casa. 1997
- Cordelia. 2000

=== Essays ===
- Movimientos literarios de vanguardia. 1974
- 6 ensayos heterodoxos. 1976
- El Surrealismo. 1978
- Camilo José Cela. Texto y contexto. 1985
- Teatre-Museu Dalí. versión íntegra. 1994, 2000
- Visiones del Quijote, "De la pedagogía al signo". 2005.
