= José Luis Mentxaca =

Spanish footballer

Personal information
- Full name: José Luis Mentxaca Fernández
- Date of birth: 21 April 1942 (age 84)
- Place of birth: Deusto, Spain
- Height: 1.78 m (5 ft 10 in)
- Position: Forward

Senior career*
Years	Team	Apps	(Gls)
1962–1966	Indautxu	47	(18)
1966–1967	Burgos	23	(9)
1967–1968	Real Oviedo	7	(2)
1968–1969	Indautxu	28	(15)
Total		105	(44)
- * Club domestic league appearances and goals

José Luis Mentxaka Fernández (born 21 April 1942) is a Spanish former professional footballer who played as a forward.

== Early and personal life ==
Mentxaka was born in Deusto; his father Nicolás and brother (also called Nicolás) were also footballers.

== Career ==
Mentxaka played for Indautxu, Burgos and Real Oviedo.
