= José Luis Jaimerena =

Spanish cyclist

Personal information
- Full name: José Luis Jaimerena Laurnagaray
- Born: 12 May 1960 (age 66) Elizondo, Spain

Cycling career
- Sport: Cycling
- Current team: Movistar Team
- Discipline: Road
- Role: Directeur sportif Rider

Professional team
- 1983: Reynolds

Managerial team
- 1996–: Banesto

José Luis Jaimerena (born 12 May 1960 in Elizondo) is a Spanish former racing cyclist and current directeur sportif for Movistar Team.

== Major results ==
1982
1st Prologue Cinturón a Mallorca
