= José Luis Calvo =

Spanish sports shooter

Personal information
- Born: 28 March 1942 (age 84) Soria, Spain

Sport
- Sport: Sports shooting

José Luis Calvo (born 28 March 1942) is a Spanish former sports shooter. He competed at the 1960, 1968, 1972 and 1980 Summer Olympics.
