= José Luis Villegas Méndez =

Mexican politician (born 1976)

- Born: 14 August 1976 (age 49); Guanajuato, Mexico
- Occupation: Politician
- Political party: PAN

José Luis Villegas Méndez (born 14 August 1976) is a Mexican politician from the National Action Party. In 2012 he served as Deputy of the LXI Legislature of the Mexican Congress representing Guanajuato.
