= José Luis Silva Silva =

Venezuelan military officer

Defense Attaché of the Venezuelan Embassy in the United States
- Incumbent
- Assumed office 15 September 2012
- President: Hugo Chávez; Nicolás Maduro; Juan Guaidó (disputed)

Personal details
- Born: José Luis Silva Silva; 28 January 1968 (age 58) San Fernando de Apure, Apure, Venezuela
- Spouse: Orli Puerta
- Children: 3 (Cristina, Felipe and Isabella)
- Education: National Experimental Polytechnic University of the Armed Forces; St. Petersburg College, University of South Florida

Military service
- Allegiance: Venezuela
- Branch/service: Venezuelan National Guard
- Years of service: 2012–present
- Rank: Colonel
- Awards: Order of Rafael Urdaneta

José Luis Silva Silva (born 28 January 1968) is a Venezuelan military officer who is an Colonel of the Venezuelan National Guard. He currently serves as Defense Attaché of the Embassy at the Bolivarian Republic of Venezuela to the United States of America in Washington D.C. During the Venezuelan presidential crisis in January 2019, Colonel Silva was the first active command officer who recognized National Assembly President Juan Guaidó as interim President of Venezuela.

== Biography ==
Colonel Silva has been commander of military units according to the degree that corresponded to him. He graduated with the highest academic honor (Summa Cum Laude) from the Military Academy of the Venezuelan National Guard on 5 July 1991 as a Bachelor of Science and Military Arts, being ranked number 5 among 157 officers. As a military, he was among the first until his last grade obtained from Colonel of Active Command. He speaks Spanish and English.

Apart from his military studies, he holds:

- Bachelor's degree in administration and public safety from Saint Petersburg College, United States (2007)
- Master in Criminology University of South Florida, United States (2008)
- Doctorate of Philosophy in criminology University of South Florida, United States (2010)

=== Venezuelan presidential crisis ===
On 26 January 2019, Colonel Silva announced through interviews in international news and digital media that he no longer recognizes Nicolás Maduro as President of Venezuela and recognized National Assembly President Juan Guaidó as its legitimate President. Silva also supported the roadmap introduced by Guaidó, which included "ceasing the usurpation of the executive power," the "beginning of a transition to a new government" and "free and transparent presidential elections."

His response led to the National Bolivarian Armed Forces of Venezuela (FANB) to put out a critical tweet on its official account. The tweet showed a screenshot from the video of Colonel Silva declaring his defection with the word "TRAITOR" emblazoned over it. The statement said "Insubordination in the face of international interests is an act of treason and cowardice with the fatherland inherited from our liberator Simón Bolívar. As such, we reject the declarations made by Col. Jose Luis Silva Silva, who was acting as military attaché in the United States."

== Decorations and honors ==
- Order of Rafael Urdaneta (Spanish: Orden Rafael Urdaneta), Second and Third Class.
- National Guard Cross (Spanish: Cruz de la Guardia Nacional), Third Class.
- Merit order to working your (Spanish: Orden mérito al trabajo), Third Class.
- Order of Diego de Lozada (Spanish: Orden Diego de Lozada), Third Class.
- Land Transit Cross (Spanish: Cruz de Tránsito terrestre), Second class.
- Cross of the Police Armed Forces (Spanish: Cruz de las Fuerzas Armadas Policiales), Second and Third Class.
- Order of Juan A. Rodríguez Domínguez (Spanish: Orden Juan A. Rodríguez Domínguez), Third Class.
- Civil Defense Order (Spanish: Orden Defensa Civil), Third Class.
