= José Luis Oliva Meza =

Mexican politician

José Luis Oliva Meza is the former mayor (1992–1994) of Naolinco, Veracruz, Mexico, and director of the radio station Grupo Oliva Radio en el estado de Veracruz.
