= Uff! =

Venezuelan boy band

- Origin: Venezuela
- Genres: Pop
- Members: Alexander Da Silva; Fabio Melannitto; Rawy Mattar; Jean Ducournau; José Luis Graterol; Marcos Causa; Luis Fernando

Uff! was a Venezuelan boy band founded in 2000. Similar in style to Menudo, Los Chicos and Los Chamos, they mimicked the fashion style of contemporary American boy bands like No Authority, Backstreet Boys and Hanson. In 2001, the band's debut album achieved a golden record in Mexico.

== Members ==
Uff! was composed of:

- Alexander Da Silva - born 2 October 1985 in Caracas
- Fabio Melannitto - born 3 February 1985 in Caracas - Died 15 August 2018 in Mexico City
- Rawy Mattar - born 14 August 1985 in Caracas
- Jean Ducournau - born 9 December 1984 in Caracas
- José Luis Graterol - born 27 September 1986 in Caracas
- Marcos Causa - born 12 September 1987 in Caracas
- Luis Fernando - born 22 November 1985 in Mexico

Member Fabio Melannitto was murdered while driving in a motorcycle in Mexico City. The assailants are still being searched for.

== Tours ==
- Yo Jamás Te Dije Adiós Tour (2022-2023)

2022
Date	City	Country	Venue
February 25	Mexico City	Mexico	Foro 1869
February 26	Mexico City	Mexico	Arena CDMX
May 6	Guadalajara	Mexico	Unknown
May 7	Monterrey	Mexico	Unknown
2023
Date	City	Country	Venue
November 10	Mexico City	Mexico	Unknown
November 11	Guadalajara	Mexico	Unknown
November 12	Monterrey	Mexico	Unknown

== Discography ==
Albums

- Ya lo ves (2000)

Song title	Writer
1. Brujería	
2. Creo En Ti	
3. Ya Lo Ves	
4. Con Él	
5. Una Piedra En El Zapato	
6. Viviendo Sin Ti	
7. Mira No	
8. Creo Que Te Amo	
9. Tarde O Temprano	
10. Si Te Vas	
11. Inolvidable	
12. You Are The One	

- Uff!oria latina (2001)

Song title	Writer
1. Cada Recuerdo	
2. Chicas	
3. Arrivederci	
4. Como Nadie	
5. Angel Del Mal	
6. Dame	
7. Canción De Amor	
8. Más Que Un Sentimiento	
9. Tal Vez	
10. Dejáme Entrar	
11. Agua Salada	
12. De Norte A Sur	

- A 10 centímetros (2003)

Song title	Writer
1. Me Enamoro De Ti	
2. Llueve	
3. Duende	
4. Aún	
5. Bajo La Piel	
6. Cómo Te Explico	
7. Vida	
8. Dáme Un Break	
9. Cordón Umbilical	
10. A 10 Centimetros	
11. Más	
12. Lágrimas De Cocodrilo	
13. Chica Ideal	

- Numa competição CTF (2019)

Song title	Writer
1. I Like Orange Juice	
2. Maybe there is no flag here	
3. Nao quero falar com bandeirantes	
4. {To_Surfando}	
5. To 1 hora da manhã na UFF fazendo isso aqui pra voces	
6. Lorde das Trevas	
7. Vida	
8. Guardinha até expulson a gente	
9. Mas é isso	
10. Obrigado por virem	
11. Nós te amamos	
12. :)	
13. Quero uma pizza mais tarde	
