= José Luis Escañuela Romana =

José Luis Escañuela
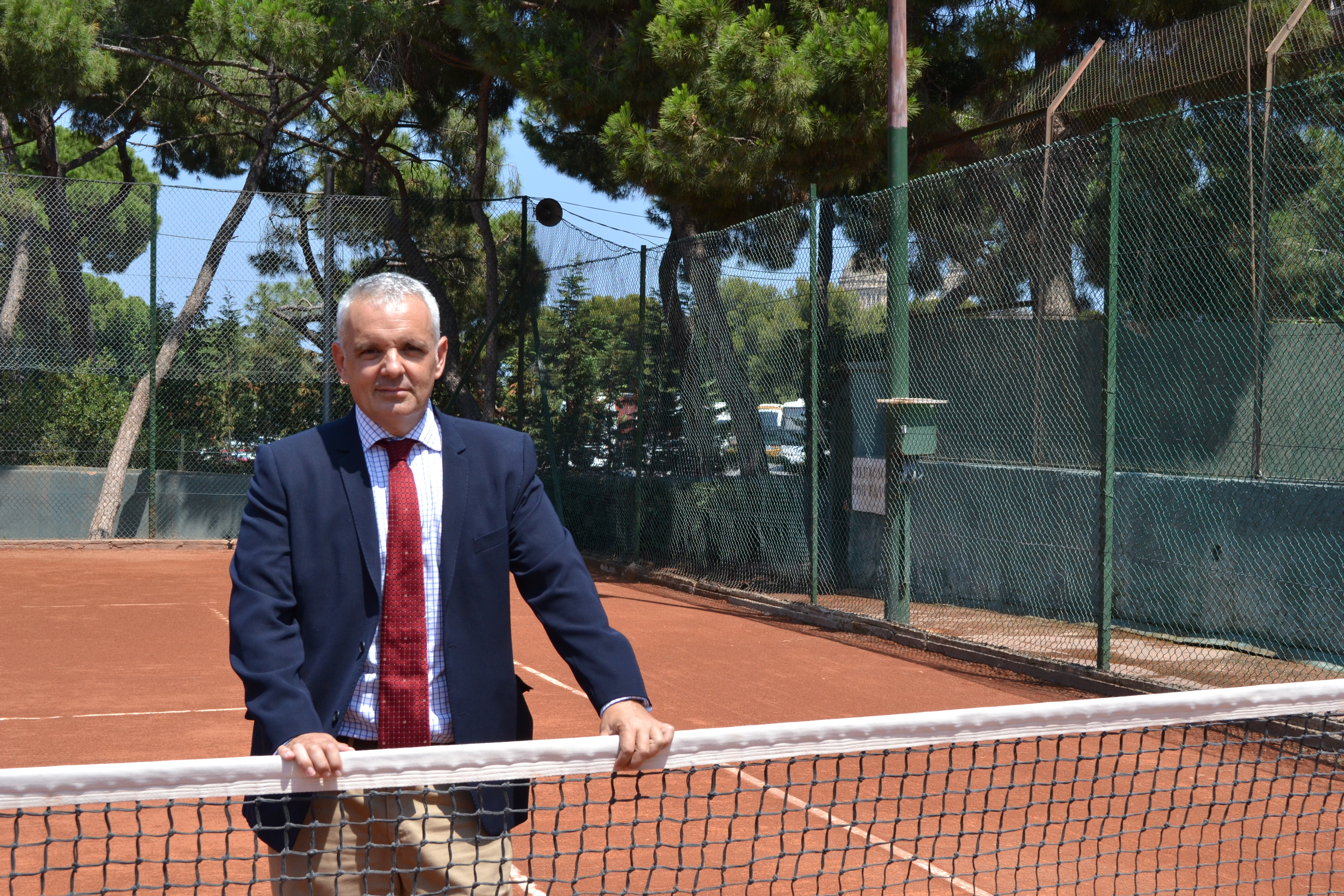
- Born: José Luis Escañuela Romana; December 19, 1964 (age 60); Sevilla, Spain
- Occupation: President of the Real Federación Española de Tenis (RFET)

José Luis Escañuela Romana (born 19 December 1964) was the President of the Real Federación Española de Tenis (RFET) 2009 - 2015.

== Biography ==
He has a law degree, qualified as an urban architect and gained a third grade degree in applied economics from the University of Seville.

He has pursued various sports and among those he has excelled in are football - at various levels, chess - winning several tournaments, and tennis, which he continues to play at his local club, the Club de Tenis Pitamo in Seville.

He has practiced as a labour lawyer for 25 years and was a promoter of the transfer of the remains of the former president of the Second Spanish Republic, Diego Martínez Barrio, to the San Fernando Cemetery in Seville.

== Sports director ==
He was elected president of the RFET in 2009, after being the president of the Federación Andaluza de Tenis (Tennis Federation of Andalusia) since 2000. During his tenure Spain has won the Davis Cup twice, in Barcelona (2009) and Seville (2011).

Escañuela Romana was the first sports director to make his assets public, in 2010. In 2013 his federation were the first to sign an agreement with Transparency International. He was also the first sporting director to nominate a woman, Gala León García, as captain of a male Spanish national sporting team.

== Awards ==
- Medalla de Oro de la Ciudad de Sevilla (2014)
- Premio Andalucía del Deporte (2008)
- Mejor Dirigente Deportivo de Andalucía concedido por la Asociación de la Prensa Andaluza en el año 2009
- Medalla de Oro de la UGT de Córdoba (2011)
- Galardones, entre ellos, Onda Cero (Premio Protagonistas) y ABC Sevilla
