= José Luis Ancalle =

Peruvian politician and lawyer

José Luis Ancalle Gutiérrez is a Peruvian lawyer and politician who was a member of the Congress of the Republic of Peru from 2020 to 2021.

== See also ==
- Politics of Peru
