= Jose Luis Ramos Escobar =

Puerto Rican writer and playwright (born 1950)

José Luis Ramos Escobar (born December 19, 1950, in Guayanilla, Puerto Rico) is a Puerto Rican writer and playwright who is also directed several plays and written television scripts. He currently serves as Dean of Humanities at the University of Puerto Rico, Rio Piedras Campus, where he is also a professor at the Drama Department.

He has published a novel, Sintigo (1985); a book of stories, En la otra orilla (1992); and plays including Indocumentados (1991), Mano dura (1994), Gení y el Zepelín (1995), The Smell of Popcorn/El Olor del Popcorn (1996), El salvador del puerto (1996), Salsa gorda (2001), ¡Puertorriqueños! (2001), and Mascarada (2004). Ramos has directed more than 18 productions and has written scripts for television including De sol a sol, a documentary about Manuel Gregorio Tavárez (for San Juan's Channel 40); Cuando despierta el amor, a dramatic TV series; Sentimientos encontrados, a miniseries; and Desandando la vida, a single episode drama (all for San Juan's Channel 6).

Escoba holds a bachelor's degree in Drama and Comparative Literature from the University of Puerto Rico (1971), and a Master's and Ph.D from Brown University in Providence, Rhode Island.

== The Smell of Popcorn / El Olor del Popcorn ==
Ramos Escobar's play, The Smell of Popcorn/El Olor del Popcorn, is an urban crime drama based on a real-life incident in which a college student and aspiring actress faces a career-thief who breaks into her apartment. The show was first written in Spanish and opened on August 17, 1993, at the Horacio Paterson Hall of Ateneo de Caracas, Venezuela, part of the Jornadas Internacionales Series of the National Theatre Festival. It was directed by Mario Colón.

On September 11, 1993, the production transferred to the Latin American Theatre Festival in San Juan, Puerto Rico.

The production subsequently played engagements in Costa Rica, Miami and the Canary Islands (1994), México (1995), Santiago de Compostela, Pontevedra and Lugo, Spain (1996), Alicante and Murcia, Spain (1997), Santo Domingo (1997), Washington DC (1998), Luis Torres Nadal Theatre Festival in Ponce, Puerto Rico (2002), Kansas (2003), León, Cádiz, Almagro and Madrid, Spain (2003). A Panama production was performed in 1998 and 1999, directed by Edgar Soberon-Torchia.

English language productions were seen in Adelaide, Australia, and the University of Wisconsin-Milwaukee, United States, (1998).

A new English language production premiered in New York City on September 9, 2010, produced by IATI Theatre and World Player's Inc., directed by Jorge Merced, featuring Luciana Faulhaber and Javier E. Gómez.

The published edition of the script (available on Editorial Cultural) is dedicated to the real-life student at the University of Puerto Rico, who one night faced off an intruder who forced his way into her apartment. Using only her wit and training as an actress, she defended herself by drawing her attacker into a psychological game that sought to distract and disarm him. The incident was widely reported in Puerto Rican newspapers.

The themes of the show include the impact and causes of urban crime, gender equality, racial, social, and economic justice.
