= José Luis Navarro =

José Luis Navarro may refer to:

- José Luis Navarro (footballer) (1936–2020), Spanish footballer
- José Luis Navarro (cyclist) (born 1962), Spanish cyclist
- José Luis Navarro (boxer) (born 1965), Spanish boxer
