= Jose Luis Hernandez =

Jose Luis Hernandez may refer to:

- José Luis Flores Hernández (born 1950), Mexican economist and politician
- José Luis Gaspar Hernández (born 1995), Cuban Olympic hurdler
- José Luis Hernández (footballer), of the Mexican team Guerreros Fútbol Club
- José Luis Hernández (actor), of the 1951 Spanish film The Evil Forest
- Jose Luis Hernandez, a Cuban boxer who fought Vincenzo Nardiello in 1985
