= José Luis Gilarranz =

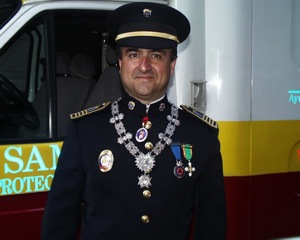
Dr.Gillaranz displaying his awards

Dr. José Luis Gilarranz (1954, Madrid - 20 February 2009) was a key figure in the development of rapid deployment systems for use in medical emergencies.

== Career ==
His first job was as a lifeguard at the sporting facilities operated by the City of Madrid. At the same time, he studied nursing and medicine and secured a position as a doctor for those same facilities.

In 1990, he founded the Servicio de Asistencia Municipal de Urgencia y Rescate (The Municipal Emergency and Rescue Service, SAMUR) to create a more efficient solution for assisting with emergency public health issues and coordinating the efforts of the agencies involved. He served as its director until 2003.

He has won several awards and decorations, including: The Orden de Isabel la Católica, the Cruz al Mérito Civil, the Cruz al Mérito Policial, the Cruz al Mérito de Protección Civil and the Medalla de la Comunidad de Madrid.

He died in 2009 after a long battle with cancer.
