= Jose Luis Cabrera (artist) =

American painter

Jose Cabrera
- Born: Jose Luis Cabrera; October 3, 1984 (age 41); Guatemala City, Guatemala
- Known for: Painting; sculpture
- Children: 1

Jose Luis Cabrera (born 1984) is a Guatemalan American contemporary visual artist, specializing in painting, sculpture, assemblage art, and video installations.

Cabrera's work involves the production of ethereal, enigmatic, romantic, Neo—magical realism and supernatural imagery. His work makes references to personal memories and found imagery. His conceptual and technical approach to making contemporary works of art is deeply influenced by the supernatural occurrences in the everyday life; Neo-expressionism, Baroque painting, Ancient Egyptian art, Mayan art, and graffiti. He currently lives and works in both Miami. Jose Cabrera's work has been out of sight from the gallery and mainstreams channels for the last couple of years, as told during a 2017 interview. He currently offers his work to collectors directly from his website.

== Biography ==
Jose Luis Cabrera graduated in 2009 from the School of the Art Institute of Chicago. His work is included in permanent collections, including: the El Rey Jesús collection;Dwyane Wade collection; Citadel LLC collection; A Woman's Worth Foundation collection, and the Giorgio Armani collection.

=== Exhibitions ===
Jose Luis Cabrera exhibited the "Let's play series Collection", his largest solo exhibition to date, at the University Club of Chicago during September—December 2009. In 2010, Cabrera exhibited in several group and solo exhibitions in venues such as the Museum of Contemporary Art, Chicago, and internationally in Switzerland, Dubai, and Central America. In 2014 Jose Cabrera was exhibition in the Miami Biennale and auction were his works sold out well before the exhibition started.

In December 2007 Cabrera exhibited at Miami Art Basel, in Miami Beach, Florida, where he was awarded the Youth Artist Award. In 2007, he presented several exhibitions, including: Inner and outer space, a solo exhibition at the Coconut Grove Rotary Club in Miami.

== See also ==
- Contemporary art
- Art Institute of Chicago
- Gagosian Gallery
- white cube
