= Zé Luis (footballer, born 1971) =

Brazilian footballer

Personal information
- Full name: José Luis Boscolo
- Date of birth: 21 March 1971 (age 55)
- Place of birth: São Paulo, Brazil
- Height: 1.70 m (5 ft 7 in)
- Position: Forward

Senior career*
Years	Team	Apps	(Gls)
1989–1992	União São João		
1993	Lousano Paulista		
1994–1995	Caldense		
1995–1996	União São João		
1996	→ Taubaté (loan)		
1997–2000	Platinense		
1997–1998	→ Sartid Smederevo (loan)		
1999–2000	→ Velo Clube (loan)		
2000	→ Ferroviária (loan)		
- * Club domestic league appearances and goals

José Luis Boscolo, known as Zé Luis (born 21 March 1971) is a Brazilian former professional footballer who played as a forward.

== Club career ==
Born in São Paulo, Zé Luis played with the Brazilian sides União São João, Lousano Paulista, Caldense, Taubaté, Platinense, Velo Clube and Ferroviária. He also played abroad, with the Serbian side Sartid Smederevo in the 1997–98 First League of FR Yugoslavia, along with two other Brazilians, Endelson and Raul Simplício. All three left Sartid at the end of the season.
