= Joselu (footballer, born August 1990) =

Spanish footballer

Personal information
- Full name: José Luis Gómez Hurtado
- Date of birth: 17 August 1990 (age 36)
- Place of birth: Granada, Spain
- Height: 1.75 m (5 ft 9 in)
- Position: Winger

Youth career
- Barcelona

Senior career*
Years	Team	Apps	(Gls)
2008–2010	Barcelona B	0	(0)
2009–2010	→ Granada (loan)	10	(0)
2010–2011	Espanyol B	15	(1)
2011–2012	Jaén	25	(2)
2012–2013	Almería B	32	(3)
2012	Almería	1	(0)
2013–2014	Córdoba	5	(0)
2014	→ Jaén (loan)	8	(0)
2014–2015	La Hoya Lorca	26	(5)
2015–2018	Linares	58	(5)
Total		180	(16)
- * Club domestic league appearances and goals

José Luis Gómez Hurtado (born 17 August 1990), commonly known as Joselu, is a Spanish former professional footballer who played mainly as a right winger.

== Club career ==
Born in Granada, Andalusia, Joselu started playing as a senior with local Granada CF in the Segunda División B after finishing his youth career with FC Barcelona. In the summer of 2010 he joined another Catalonia side, Tercera División's RCD Espanyol B.

After one season, Joselu rescinded his contract with the club and signed for Real Jaén of the third division. For the 2012–13 campaign, he continued in that level and his native region with UD Almería's reserves.

Joselu made his competitive debut with Almería's first team on 17 August 2012, playing the last two minutes of the 5–4 away win against FC Barcelona B in what was his maiden Segunda División appearance. On 2 July of the following year, he moved to neighbouring Córdoba CF in the same tier; in the next transfer window, he was loaned to fellow second-division Jaén.
