= Jose Luis Romero Hicks =

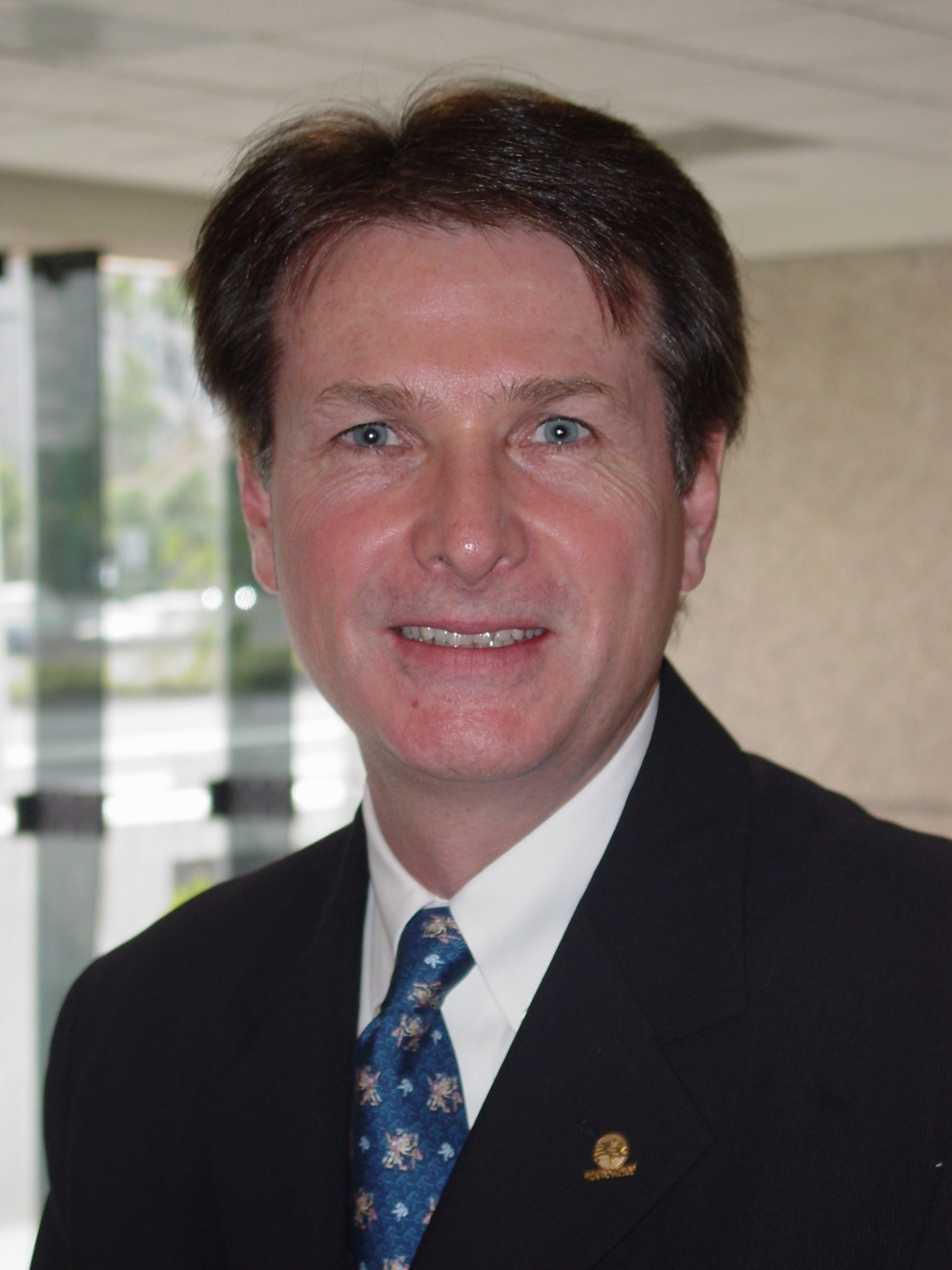

José Luis Romero Hicks (born April 8, 1957, in Guanajuato, Mexico) is a private legal, economic and financial consultant and managing partner of the law firm Romero Hicks & Galindo. He is also a member of the Mexican Council on Foreign Affairs.

== Education ==
Romero Hicks is an attorney from the University of Guanajuato. He holds a bachelor's degree in Government from Lawrence University and a master's degree in Social Science-Economics from Southern Oregon State College.

== Family ==
He is married to Chiemi Murakami and has two children.

== Political and professional career ==
Romero Hicks is a private legal, economic and financial consultant. He is a member of the Board of Trustees of the University of Guanajuato, a member of the Mexican Council on Foreign Affairs, and provides regular national TV and radio commentary in Mexico.

He served under President Carlos Salinas as Director General for Housing Policy at the Ministry for Social Development.

In 1995 he served under Governor Vicente Fox as Minister of Planning and Finance, Guanajuato State Government. In 1974 he joined the Institutional Revolutionary Party.

At Guanajuato State University he worked as professor of Law and Economics and became Planning Director.

His professional and personal endeavors have let him serve as CFO of Desarrolladora Metropolitana Corporation; one of Mexico's top 10 housing companies. President of his home town's Food Bank and President of the Guanajuato Institute for Political Science and Public Administration.

Romero Hicks was General Director for Housing Policy at the Ministry for Social Development.

During President Vicente Fox’s transitional government, Romero Hicks co-chaired the National Housing Policy Committee.

Preceded by Enrique Vilatela	President & CEO of Bancomext; 2000—2003	Succeeded by Hector Reyes Retana
