= José Luis Medina Lizalde =

Mexican politician

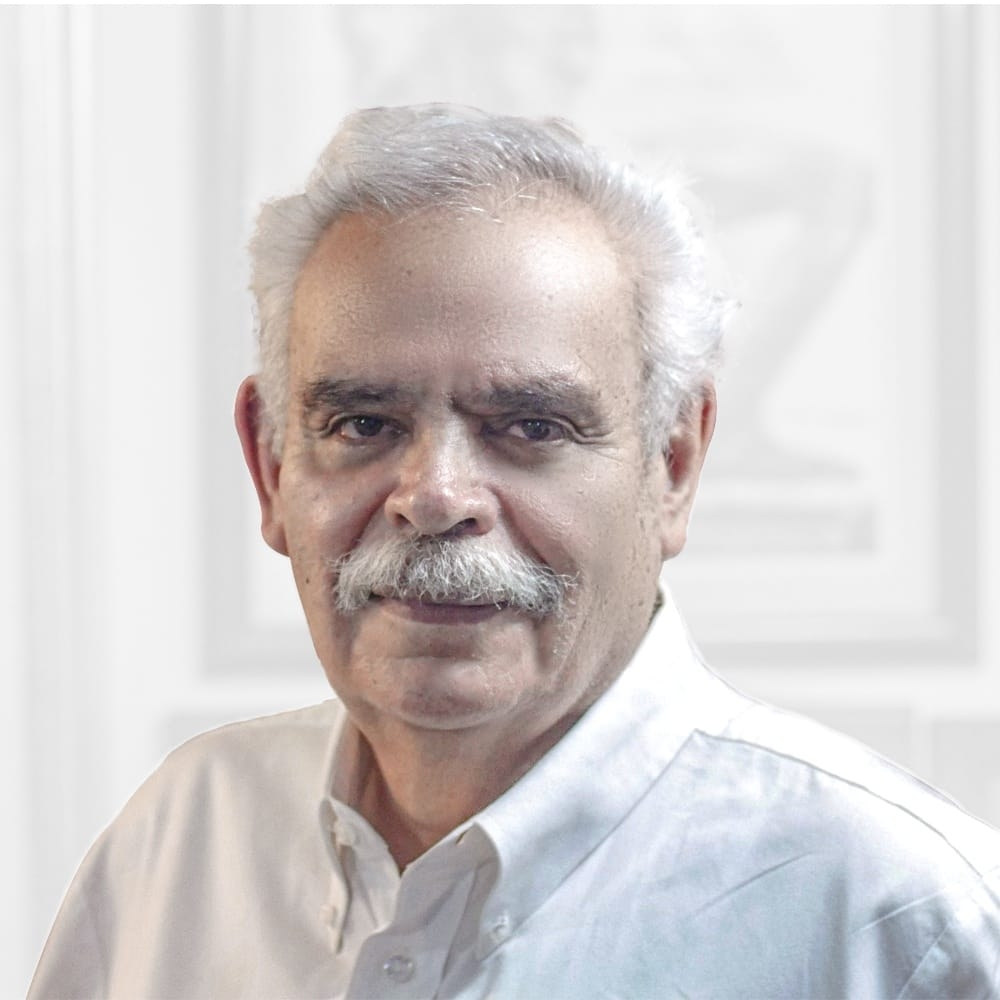
- Portrait of José Luis Medina Lizalde
- Born: 26 December 1951 (age 74); Zacatecas, Mexico
- Occupation: Politico
- Political party: MORENA

José Luis Medina Lizalde (born 26 December 1951) is a Mexican politician affiliated with the Party Morena . As of 2014, he served as Deputy of the LIX Legislature of the Mexican Congress as a plurinominal representative...
