= José Luis Blasio =

Maximilian I of Mexico's personal secretary

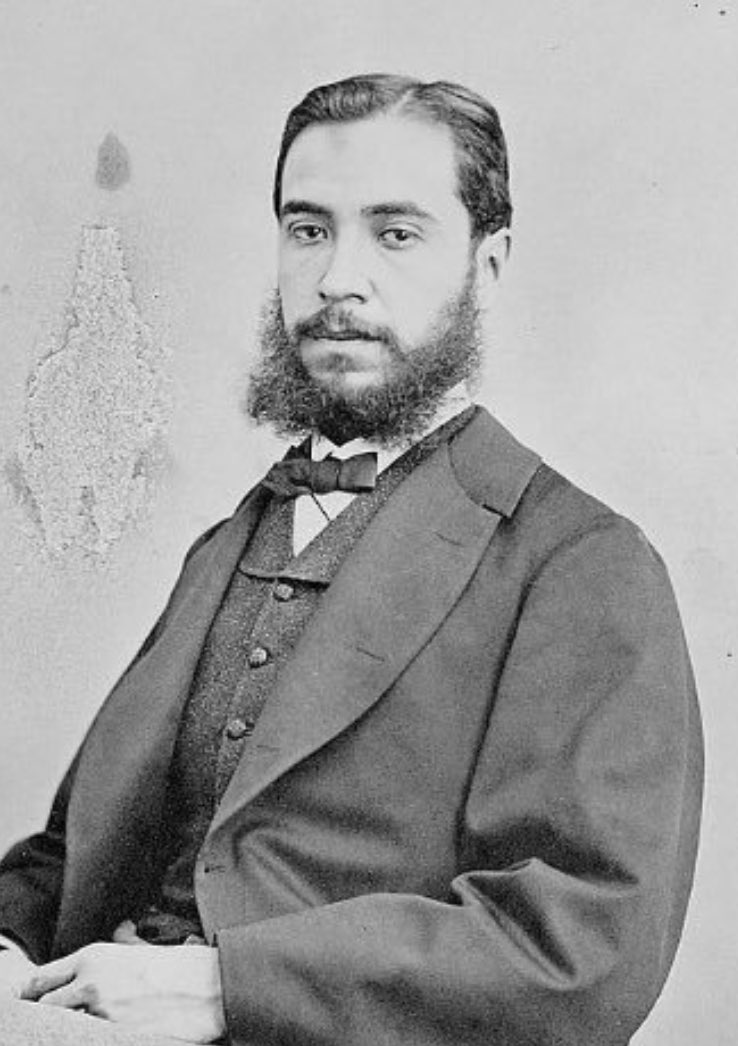
- Born: 1842
- Died: September 5, 1923 (aged 80–81); Tacubaya, Mexico City
- Occupation: Private secretary to Emperor Maximilian I of Mexico

José Luis Blasio y Prieto (1842 – September 5, 1923, in Mexico City) was private secretary to Emperor Maximilian I of Mexico from 1865 to 1867. He published the book Maximiliano Íntimo (Intimate Maximilian) in 1905, based on his experiences during his service to the second Emperor of Mexico.

== Early years ==
He was the second son of Agustín de la Peza and Luisa Blasio. He attended private schools as a child and also went to Colegio Nacional de Minería (National College of Mining) but did not complete his studies because of the death of his father. He also attended Escuela de Comercio (Business School).

== Private secretary to Maximilian I of Mexico ==
Before meeting the second Emperor of Mexico (and because of his fluency in the French language), Blasio served as interpreter to engineer Felix Eloin who was close to the emperor. After Eloin left Mexico, Commander Loysel became Blasio's boss. At this time, he was ordered to personally deliver some documents to the emperor (at the time in Veracruz), and upon arrival was invited to rest for a few days. During this brief stay, Maximiliano's then secretary, Austrian Nicolás de Poliakóvitz, broke his arm while horseriding, this led the emperor replacing Poliakovitz with the young Blasio. Blasio kept this position until the death of the emperor in 1867.

== Railways of Mexico ==
Blasio worked as a bookkeeper for Ferrocarriles de México (Railways of Mexico), the company from which he retired, and received a medal after 50 years of service to the company.

== Maximiliano Íntimo ==
After his retirement from Ferrocarriles de Mexico Blasio devoted his time to writing a book, in which he related his experiences as the emperor's personal secretary.

== Personal life ==
His wife was Adela Yglesias Guerra; they never had children. After the death of his wife, Blasio lived his remaining years with his wife's sister. He died on September 5, 1923, in the Colegio Militar #11, Tacubaya, in Mexico City.
