= Pepelu Vidal =

Spanish footballer (born 1995)

Personal information
- Full name: José Luis Vidal Romero
- Date of birth: 27 August 1995 (age 31)
- Place of birth: Lebrija, Spain
- Position: Forward

Team information
- Current team: Atlético Antoniano
- Number: 10

Youth career
- 2006–2014: Betis

Senior career*
Years	Team	Apps	(Gls)
2014–2015	Betis B	3	(0)
2015	→ Algeciras (loan)	1	(0)
2015	Recreativo B	8	(1)
2015	Recreativo	1	(0)
2015–2016	Atlético Antoniano	20	(15)
2016	Getafe B	2	(0)
2016–2017	Atlético Antoniano	23	(5)
2017	Leiknir F.	3	(0)
2017–2018	Atlético Sanluqueño	20	(2)
2018–2019	Cabecense	38	(4)
2019	Fjarðabyggðar	20	(11)
2019–2020	Atlético Antoniano	17	(4)
2020	KF Víðir	8	(1)
2020–	Atlético Antoniano	9	(0)
- * Club domestic league appearances and goals as of 19:55, 24 May 2021 (UTC)

José Luis 'Pepelu' Vidal Romero (born 27 August 1995) is a Spanish footballer who plays for Atlético Antoniano as a forward.

== Club career ==
Born in Lebrija, Province of Seville, Vidal joined Real Betis' youth setup in 2006, aged 11. On 30 July 2013 he signed a contract extension with the Andalusians.

On 28 November 2013, while still a junior, Vidal made his first-team debut, coming on as a late substitute in a 0–1 away loss against Lyon in that season's UEFA Europa League. On 20 January 2015, after appearing rarely with the reserves, he was loaned to Tercera División club Algeciras CF until June.

On 24 July 2015 Vidal was released by the Verdiblancos. He subsequently joined Recreativo de Huelva, being initially assigned to the reserves in the regional leagues.

Pepelu joined Club Atlético Antoniano in December 2015. After scoring 15 goals in 20 appearances, he signed for Getafe CF B on 5 August 2016.

On 28 October 2016, Pepelu returned to Atlético Antoniano, after receiving little playing time at Geta.
