= José Luis Orbegozo =

Spanish businessman and sports leader

- Born: José Luis Orbegozo Balzola; 2 September 1929; San Sebastián, Gipuzkoa, Spain
- Died: 17 January 2010 (aged 80); San Sebastián, Gipuzkoa, Spain
- Citizenship: Spanish
- Occupations: Businessman; Sports leader
- Known for: Second president of Real Sociedad

2nd president of Real Sociedad
- In office 1967–1983
- Preceded by: Antonio Vega de Seoane Barroso
- Succeeded by: Iñaki Alkiza

1st president of UECF
- In office December 1912 – 5 February 1914

José Luis Orbegozo Balzola (2 September 1929 – 17 January 2010) was a Spanish businessman and sports leader, who served as the 22nd president of the Real Sociedad for 16 years between 1967 and 1983.

== Sporting career ==
José Luis Orbegozo was born in San Sebastián on 2 September 1929, and became a member of his hometown club Real Sociedad in 1936, when he was only six years old. In 1966 he joined the board of directors then chaired by Antonio Vega de Seoane Barroso, with the help of his friend Tomás Álvarez de Eulate, and held the position of treasurer until 1967. After the historic promotion to the First Division, he was named president, and he transformed a recently promoted team into a champion team.

Under his mandate, Real consolidated its position in the First Division, qualified for European competitions for the first time, and achieved significant success with two League titles in 1980–81, 1981–82 and a Super Cup in 1982 against Real Madrid. He was a firm defender of the commitment to the youth team and, with him as president, Real opened up to the entire territory of Gipuzkoa. Together with his friend Javier Expósito, he provided the club with important foundations for the future, strengthening the youth team.

In 1980, Orbegozo inaugurated a field in Orbegozo because he wanted to build a new stadium for Real Sociedad in Zubieta. The project took advantage of a subsidy for the use of the new field as the venue for the FIFA 1982 World Cup, but this did not come to pass due to the opposition of the city council. Once San Sebastián was ruled out as the venue for the FIFA World Cup, the project was paralyzed, and the field, whose works had already begun, was converted into a training ground and sports city for Real Sociedad. In 1983, Orbegozo was replaced as president by Iñaki Alkiza and received the gold and diamond medal from the San Sebastian club. However, when he left leaving the club without its own field, without a heritage that would have been key in the future. In fact, when he left the Txuri Urdin entity, he already warned that the club had "a death row".

== Death ==
Orbegozo died in San Sebastián on 17 January 2010, at the age of 80 from a cerebral infarction while watching a Real Sociedad match. Sociedad announced that all its teams would wear black armbands on the next matchday, in addition to keeping a minute of silence in all the games in which they play, in memory of Orbegozo. His funeral took place on the following day on 18 January in the Cathedral of the Good Shepherd of San Sebastian and the entire Sociedad squad from the 2009–10 season attended, as well as the last presidents and leaders of the entity.

== Legacy ==
The main field (Z-1) of the Zubieta Facilities, where Real Sociedad trains, was named after José Luis Orbegozo in 2010 in tribute to him, a field that had been inaugurated by him in 1980.
