= Tomás Yerro =

Spanish writer (1951–2021)

Tomás Yerro Villanueva
- Born: 11 February 1951
- Died: 10 April 2021
- Occupation: Writer, academic, literary critic
- Period: 1977 - 2021
- Notable works: Lerín. Buque varado sobre el río Ega (2021) Personas mayores, patrimonio de primera (2020) Amado Alonso: el español de las dos orillas (coord. 2014) Por la senda del Quijote (coord. 2005) Escritores Navarros Actuales: antología (coord. 1990) Narrativa Española Actual 1993-1997 (1998) Nuevos modos de arte de narrar (1998) Didáctica de la publicidad (Madrid, Ministerio de Educación y Ciencia, 1990) ‘Río Arga’, revista poética navarra: estudio y antología (con Charo Fuentes, 1988) La lectura creadora (Pamplona, 1988) Aspectos técnicos y estructurales de la novela española actual (Pamplona, EUNSA, 1977), investigación pionera en su momento
- Notable awards: Premio Príncipe de Viana de la Cultura

Tomás Yerro Villanueva (11 February 1951 – 10 April 2021) was a Spanish writer, academic, and literary critic.

He received the Premio Príncipe de Viana de la Cultura in 2019.

== Publications ==
- Lerín. Buque varado sobre el río Ega (2021)
- Personas mayores, patrimonio de primera (2020).
- Amado Alonso: el español de las dos orillas (coord. 2014).
- Por la senda del Quijote (coord. 2005).
- Escritores Navarros Actuales: antología (coord. 1990).
- Narrativa Española Actual 1993-1997 (1998).
- Nuevos modos de arte de narrar (1998).
- Didáctica de la publicidad (Madrid, Ministerio de Educación y Ciencia, 1990)
- ‘Río Arga’, revista poética navarra: estudio y antología (con Charo Fuentes, 1988).
- La lectura creadora (Pamplona, 1988)
- Aspectos técnicos y estructurales de la novela española actual (Pamplona, EUNSA, 1977), investigación pionera en su momento.
