= José Luis Romero (journalist) =

Murdered Mexican crime journalist

- Born: ca. 1967 (Age: 44)
- Disappeared: 30 December 2009; Los Mochis, Sinaloa, Mexico
- Status: Found dead; Missing for more than two weeks
- Died: Around 2 January 2010; Near Los Mochis, Sinaloa, Mexico
- Cause of death: Shot multiple times and beaten
- Body discovered: Near Los Mochis, Mexico on 16 January 2010
- Resting place: San Juan de Los Lagos Church (service) & Higueras de Zaragoza, San Lorenzo Viejo
- Education: Political Science and Public Administration at the Autonomous University of Sinaloa
- Occupation: Radio journalist
- Years active: Around 20 years
- Employer: Linea Directa Radio
- Organization: Radio Sistema del Noroeste
- Known for: Drug trafficking broadcasts
- Spouse: Citlali Estrella
- Awards: Aarón Flores Heredia Award

José Luis Romero (1967 – around 30 December 2009), was a Mexican radio journalist for Línea Directa Radio and Radio Sistema del Noroeste in Los Mochis, Sinaloa, Mexico, and he was known for his reporting about drug trafficking. Romero was a journalist for roughly 20 years and had been with Línea Directa for ten years. He had been missing for two weeks until his body was found tortured and brutally murdered. Romero's murder, along with other Mexican journalists who have been killed during their job, was interpreted by CNN as intimidation toward journalists.

== Personal ==
José Luis Romero was born around 1967. He received an education in Political Science and Public Administration at the Autonomous University of Sinaloa. His funeral was held on January 17, 2010. A memorial service was held one year after his death and it was noted that no progress had been made on the investigation of his case.

== Career ==
José Luis Romero covered public security and legal matters as a radio journalist for "Línea Directa". His program was broadcast by the Radio Sistema del Noroeste. He was best known for his reports on the Mexican drug war and drug trafficking. He had worked as a radio journalist for nearly 20 years at the time of his death.

During his career, Romero was twice awarded the Los Mochis Journalists Association's Aarón Flores Heredia Award for his coverage of security and legal matters and the police beat.

== Death ==
Los Mochis, Sinaloa, is in northern Mexico and shown relative to the capital Mexico City.

José Luis Romero was a victim of drug cartel violence in one of the most dangerous states in Mexico. The Mexican journalist was abducted from a restaurant located in Los Mochis, Sinaloa by a group of armed men. It was reported that Romero was shot shortly after his abduction. This was detected by how badly his corpse had already decomposed after its discovery.

Romero was kidnapped on 30 December 2009 outside a seafood restaurant at the intersection of Álvaro Obregón and Doroteo Arango in the Jiquilpan neighborhood. The veteran journalist went on vacation in late December and was set to return to work on his news program in January. He was taken by four hooded men with rifles who came for him in a red truck, and they also stole his vehicle. Hours after the State Ministerial Police's chief investigator, Jesús Escalante Leyva, began to make his initial inquiries into Romero's disappearance, he was also shot and killed outside of his office. Romero's decomposing body was discovered alongside a highway outside of Los Mochis early on 16 January 2010. The journalist's corpse had signs that he had beaten and tortured, his leg and hands had been broken, and he had been shot three times and then wrapped in a black plastic bag.

== Context ==
José Luis Romero was a crime reporter and had been reporting on drug trafficking in one of the states hardest hit by the Mexican drug war. The city of Los Mochis, where he was kidnapped, is in the northern part of the Mexican state of Sinaloa. The Sinaloa Cartel, a drug trafficking organization led by Joaquín Guzmán Loera (a.k.a. El Chapo Guzmán), is based there, and according to the Committee to Protect Journalists, at least seventeen reporters were murdered in the between 1992 and 2009, the year when Romero was killed. At the time of Romero's death, Mexico had begun to draft a law that would aid the security of "high risk journalists".

== Impact ==
Romero is among a list of Mexican journalists who have been abducted and then later found dead, and his abduction follows months after María Esther Aguilar Cansimbe's disappearance and five years after award-winning editor Alfredo Jiménez Mota's abduction. The Inter American Press Association was alarmed by the increasing number of journalists abducted and killed in 2010. The killing of José Luis Romero could have been seen as intimidation towards journalists by the drug cartel in Mexico after the discovery of a cardboard plate that had indicated the whereabouts of the abducted journalist.

The discovery of Romero's body was marked as the 59th journalist killed in Mexico since 2000. His was reported by Mexico's National Human Rights Commission. Romero was thought to be the first Mexican journalist killed in 2010 but was the second body discovered and one of three found dead during January in Sinloa. Valentín Valdés Espinosa had been found dead on 8 January and his newspaper ceased covering the drug war afterward.

== Reactions ==
After the disappearance of José Luis Romero on 30 December, a vigil took place outside the attorney general's office in Los Mochis, Sinaloa. Reporters came together asking authorities to respond to the abduction at a faster pace. Romero's death was condemned by Irina Bokova, the Director-General of UNESCO, and she urged the Mexican authorities would bring those involved in Romero's death to justice.

After multiple murders of Mexican journalists, senators made a proposal for a new law stating that journalists who are attacked would be guaranteed medical care. The journalists, as well as their families could request for protection from authorities and give them the right to protect the confidentiality of their sources.

== Awards ==
- Los Mochis Journalists Association's Aarón Flores Heredia Award (2006 and 2008)

== See also ==
- List of journalists killed in Mexico
- List of solved missing person cases (2000s)
- List of unsolved murders (2000–present)
- Timeline of the Mexican drug war
