= José Luis Paris =

- Born: 1936; Ferrol, Spain
- Died: 2003 (aged 66–67)
- Years active: 1970–2002

José Luis Paris, better known as Don José (1936–2003) was a Spanish musician, singer who from the 1970s lived in London.

== Trio "Zafiro" ==
He was one of the three members of the Spanish Trio Romantico 'Trio Zafiro' and travelled the world extensively, ending up in London with a residence in the Embassy Club. Trio Zafiro also starred in many TV appearances and performed in a movie called Pasa La Tuna. Jose also spent a brief time with a European-based Latin American trio called Los Andinos and travelled the world as a support act for Dorothy Squires.

== Don Jose ==
In the early 1970s, he left the group to form a Latin American Duo with Pedro Abalenda called 'Don Jose & Don Pedro'. They were signed to the Decca Label and produced an album called Don Pedro & Don Jose while maintaining a residency at London's Concordia Notte restaurant, W2. They also performed the Misa Criolla live on Welsh TV. Don Pedro then went back to Spain and a new singer from Costa Rica was introduced called Enzo Fernando. They Recorded an album called 'A Night out at the Concordia Notte' on the Sun Records Label and were then signed to EMI and produced 4 singles, 'San Jose', 'Mr Guitarista', 'Welcome to my Heart' and 'Lola From Barcelona'.

He carried on his professional career until his death recording a number of other releases and appearing on 3-2-1 with Ted Rogers (comedian) and many times on BBC radio 2. He appeared many times live all over the world and on British TV in the 1970s and 1980s and many radio appearances to credit as well.

== Recordings ==
His recording career started in the 1950s with Los Zafiros who produced 4 albums and toured worldwide. His solo recordings include:

- Don Jose and Don Pedro (1970),
- Don Jose and Enzo Fernando A Night Out at the Concordia Notte (recorded in a studio with double bassist Brian Brocklehurst, Moonshine 1977),
- San Jose (1978),
- Lola from Barcelona (1978),
- Don José Flamenco Fiesta with Tupac and his son Jason Paris (1992).

His most popular and frequently covered piece is 'Chamorro (song)' a song about a church on a mountainside just outside his hometown where it is said a miracle took place.

Don Jose was a water rat and a member of the Vaudeville Golfing Society of which he was Captain in 2002.
