= Jamie Moore (boxer) =

British boxing trainer and former professional boxer

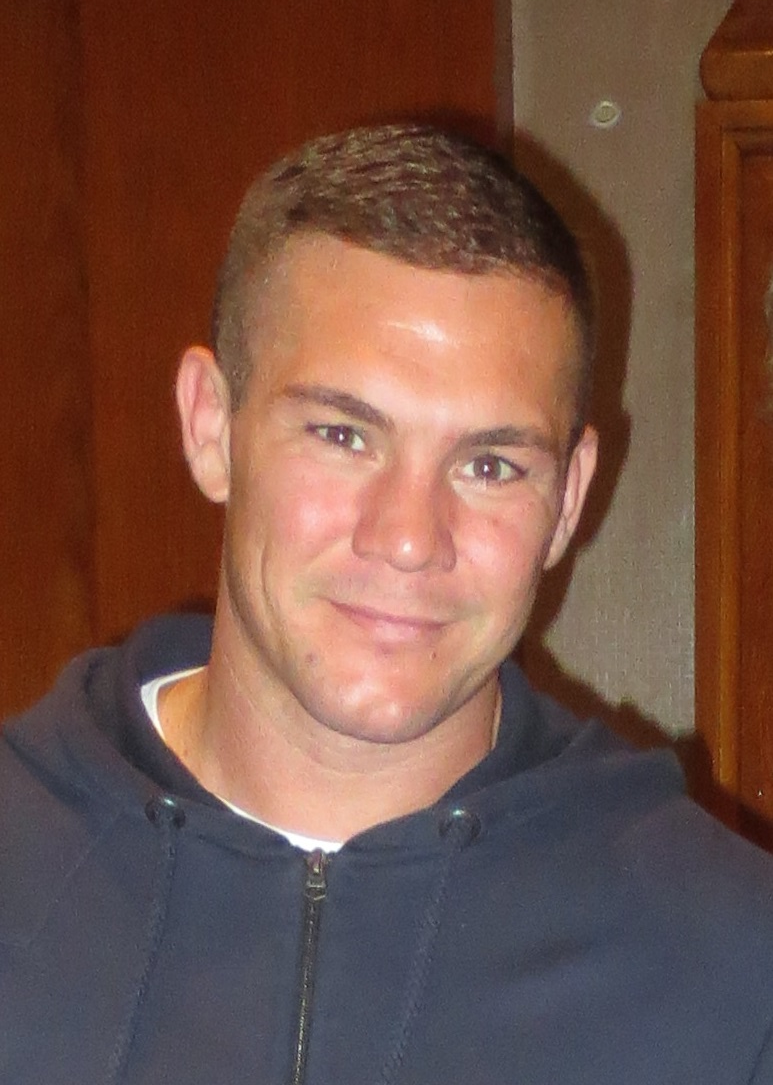
- Moore in 2013

Personal information
- Nicknames: The Fighter's Fighter; Moorsey
- Nationality: British
- Born: 4 November 1978 (age 47) Walkden, City of Salford, England
- Height: 5 ft 9 1/2 in (177 cm)
- Weight: Light middleweight

Boxing career
- Stance: Southpaw

Boxing record
- Total fights: 37
- Wins: 32
- Win by KO: 23
- Losses: 5

Jamie Moore (born 4 November 1978) is a British boxing trainer and former professional boxer who competed from 1999 to 2010. He held the British and Commonwealth super welterweight titles twice between 2003 and 2007, and the European super welterweight title in 2009

Moore vacated the British title in December 2007 to concentrate on the European title, which he won in March 2009 by stopping former world champion Michele Piccirillo in the 3rd round. He announced his retirement on 12 April 2010, upon receiving medical advice from the British Boxing Board of Control.

== Boxing career ==
Moore boxed as an amateur before turning professional in October 1999. He won his professional debut against Jamie Rolfe scoring a knockout in the third second of the first round on a card that included Thomas Eade, Robert Hill Daniels, Paul Barnard and journeyman Peter Buckley.

Moore's first opportunity to fight for a title belt, the WBU Intercontinental light middleweight title, was in July 2001. However, Moore suffered the first defeat of his career when Scott Dixon stopped Moore in the fifth of the scheduled twelve rounds to take the title, despite Moore having Dixon down in the third round.

=== Trilogy with Michael Jones ===
In 2003, Moore fought Liverpool's Michael Jones for both the British and Commonwealth light middleweight title at the Everton Park Sports Centre in north Liverpool. Moore won this tough fight on points to win his first professional title. Moore retained the British title in subsequent fights and became the first Salford Fighter in over 100 years to win the Lonsdale Belt. However, this was not the last that Moore was to see of Liverpudlian Michael Jones, as the pair fought again in November 2004 again at the Altrincham Leisure Centre in Greater Manchester for the British title. This time around, Moore lost after being disqualified in the third round to hitting on the break. The pair again faced each other for a third and final time in July 2005 at the same venue and once again for the British light middleweight title, but this time Moore avenged the defeat he suffered the previous year by stopping Jones in the sixth round. Following this, Moore avenged his loss Thomas Eade in a huge showdown.

== Professional boxing record ==
37 fights	32 wins	5 losses
By knockout	24	4
By decision	8	1
Draws	0	

No.	Result	Record	Opponent	Type	Round, time	Date	Location	Notes
37	Loss	32–5	(Belarus) Siarhei Khamitski	RTD	6 (10), 3:00	2010-04-03	(United Kingdom) M.E.N. Arena, Manchester, England	
36	Loss	32–4	(United Kingdom) Ryan Rhodes	TKO	7 (12), 2:35	2009-10-23	(United Kingdom) Bolton Arena, Bolton, England	Lost European super welterweight title
35	Win	32–3	(Ukraine) Roman Dzhuman	TKO	2 (12)	2009-05-02	(United Kingdom) Crowtree Leisure Centre, Sunderland, England	Retained European super welterweight title
34	Win	31–3	(Italy) Michele Piccirillo	KO	3 (12), 2:15	2009-03-06	(United Kingdom) Robin Park Centre, Wigan, England	Won vacant European super welterweight title
33	Win	30–3	(Republic of Ireland) Ciaran Healy	TKO	3 (10), 2:13	2008-07-05	(Republic of Ireland) National Basketball Arena, Dublin, Ireland	Won the BUI Ireland National super welterweight title.
32	Win	29–3	(Mexico) Esau Herrera	TKO	5 (6), 1:31	2008-05-24	(United Kingdom) City of Manchester Stadium, Manchester, England	
31	Win	28–3	(United Kingdom) Andrew Facey	TKO	11 (12), 2:14	2007-10-26	(United Kingdom) Robin Park Centre, Wigan, England	Retained British super welterweight title
30	Win	27–3	(Argentina) Sebastian Andres Lujan	PTS	12	2007-04-13	(United Kingdom) Leisure Centre, Altrincham, England	
29	Win	26–3	(Romania) Mugurel Sebe	PTS	8	2007-03-09	(United Kingdom) Goresbrook Leisure Centre, Dagenham, London, England	
28	Win	25–3	(United Kingdom) Matthew Macklin	KO	10 (12), 1:29	2006-09-29	(United Kingdom) George H Carnall Leisure Centre, Manchester, England	Retained British super welterweight title
27	Win	24–3	(Belgium) Mike Algoet	TKO	5 (8), 1:43	2006-07-21	(United Kingdom) Leisure Centre, Altrincham, England	
26	Win	23–3	(Ukraine) Volodymyr Borovskyy	TKO	3 (8), 2:58	2006-01-27	(United Kingdom) Goresbrook Leisure Centre, Dagenham, London, England	
25	Win	22–3	(United Kingdom) David Walker	TKO	4 (12), 0:40	2005-09-23	(United Kingdom) George Carnall Leisure Centre, Manchester, England	Retained British super welterweight title
24	Win	21–3	(United Kingdom) Michael Jones	TKO	6 (12), 1:04	2005-07-08	(United Kingdom) Leisure Centre, Altrincham, England	Won British super welterweight title
23	Loss	20–3	(United Kingdom) Michael Jones	DQ	3 (12), 1:16	2004-11-26	(United Kingdom) Leisure Centre, Altrincham, England	Lost British super welterweight title Moore was disqualificated for hitting his opponent on the break.
22	Loss	20–2	(Ghana) Ossie Duran	KO	3 (12), 1:06	2004-06-26	(United Kingdom) King's Hall, Belfast, Northern Ireland	Lost Commonwealth super welterweight title
21	Win	20–1	(Uganda) Adam Katumwa	TKO	5 (12), 2:18	2004-04-10	(United Kingdom) M.E.N. Arena, Manchester, England	Retained Commonwealth super welterweight title
20	Win	19–1	(United Kingdom) Andrew Facey	TKO	7 (12), 1:24	2003-11-22	(United Kingdom) King's Hall, Belfast, Northern Ireland	Retained British super welterweight title
19	Win	18–1	(United Kingdom) Gary Logan	TKO	5 (12), 2:44	2003-10-18	(United Kingdom) M.E.N. Arena, Manchester, England	Retained British and Commonwealth super welterweight titles
18	Win	17–1	(United Kingdom) Michael Jones	PTS	12	2003-04-19	(United Kingdom) Everton Park Sports Centre, Liverpool, England	Won Commonwealth and vacant British super welterweight titles
17	Win	16–1	(Russia) Akhmed Oligov	PTS	6	2003-02-08	(United Kingdom) Everton Park Sports Centre, Liverpool, England	
16	Win	15–1	(United Kingdom) Delroy Mellis	TKO	6 (6), 1:05	2002-09-07	(United Kingdom) Everton Park Sports Centre, Liverpool, England	
15	Win	14–1	(Poland) Andrzej Butowicz	TKO	5 (8), 2:57	2002-03-09	(United Kingdom) Wythenshawe Forum, Manchester, England	
14	Win	13–1	(United Kingdom) Harry Butler	TKO	3 (6), 1:02	2002-01-26	(United Kingdom) Goresbrook Leisure Centre, Dagenham, London, England	
13	Loss	12–1	(United Kingdom) Scott Dixon	KO	5 (12), 2:41	2001-07-07	(United Kingdom) Velodrome, Manchester, England	
12	Win	12–0	(United Kingdom) Paul Denton	TKO	3 (4), 1:12	2001-05-27	(United Kingdom) Palace Hotel, Manchester, England	
11	Win	11–0	(United Kingdom) Richie Murray	TKO	1 (4), 2:23	2001-03-17	(United Kingdom) Wythenshawe Forum, Manchester, England	
10	Win	10–0	(United Kingdom) Wayne Shepherd	TKO	3 (6)	2000-11-25	(United Kingdom) Wythenshawe Forum, Manchester, England	
9	Win	9–0	(United Kingdom) Kasi Kaihau	TKO	2 (4)	2000-11-12	(United Kingdom) Palace Hotel, Manchester, England	
8	Win	8–0	(United Kingdom) Leigh Wicks	PTS	4	2000-10-07	(United Kingdom) Doncaster Dome, Doncaster, England	
7	Win	7–0	(United Kingdom) Koba Kulu	RTD	3 (6)	2000-05-27	(United Kingdom) Elephant & Castle Centre, Southwark, England	
6	Win	6–0	(United Kingdom) Jimmy Steel	PTS	6	2000-04-14	(United Kingdom) Palace Hotel, Manchester, England	
5	Win	5–0	(United Kingdom) Harry Butler	TKO	2 (6)	2000-03-20	(United Kingdom) Mansfield Leisure Centre, Mansfield, England	
4	Win	4–0	(United Kingdom) David Baptiste	TKO	3 (4)	2000-02-29	(United Kingdom) Bowlers Exhibition Centre, Manchester, England	
3	Win	3–0	(United Kingdom) Paul King	PTS	6	1999-12-19	(United Kingdom) The Willows, Salford, England	
2	Win	2–0	(United Kingdom) Peter Nightingale	PTS	4	1999-11-13	(United Kingdom) KC Sports Arena, Hull, England	
1	Win	1–0	(Botswana) Clive Johnson	TKO	3 (4), 1:43	1999-10-09	(United Kingdom) Bowlers Exhibition Centre, Manchester, England	Professional debut.

=== Matthew Macklin Affair ===
Moore's most high-profile fight in his professional career came in September 2006 when he fought Matthew Macklin in Manchester. Macklin, himself a former Irish middleweight titleholder and at the time being trained at Billy Graham's gym across the city from Moore's gym, helped to increase the rivalry leading up to the fight. Moore defeated Macklin in a "fight of the year" contender to reclaim the British light middleweight title.

== Shooting in Marbella ==
Four years after retiring from boxing, Moore was shot twice, once in the hip and in the leg in Marbella on 3 August 2014. Moore, working as a pundit for Sky Sports, was in Spain to train old foe Matthew Macklin, who now owned a gym in the Costa del Sol resort. In the aftermath of the incident, Macklin tweeted: "Just to let everyone know Jamie Moore is still in hospital but he's OK. He was shot in his legs but the doctors have said there shouldn't be any serious or permanent damage done."

== Trainer of the year 2018 ==
In 2018 Moore was awarded trainer of the year after winning multiple titles as a trainer with a bunch of talented fighters including Carl Frampton, Rocky Fielding and more. Moore is going from strength to strength in his career as a boxing trainer, with the likes of Carl Frampton, Tommy Coyle, Martin Murray, Rocky Fielding and most recently Jack Catterall all linking up with him and Nigel Travis at the VIP Gym in Astley in the last few months. In 2021, Moore opened Walkden ABC, an amateur boxing gym, in his hometown.

His current stable in 2019 includes Amir Khan, Tyson Fury, Carl Frampton, Tommy Coyle, Steven Ward, Martin Murray, Rocky Fielding, Jack Catterall, Aqib Fiaz, Chantelle Cameron, Sean McGoldrick, Dave Allen and Marc Leach.

== Titles in boxing ==
Preceded by Wayne Alexander	British light middleweight champion 19 April 2003 – 26 November 2004	Succeeded by Michael Jones
Vacant Title last held by Michael Jones	British light middleweight champion 8 July 2005 – 8 December 2007; Vacated	Vacant Title next held by Gary Woolcombe
Vacant Title last held by Michael Jones	Commonwealth light middleweight champion 19 April 2003 – 31 January 2004; Vacated	Vacant Title next held by Richard Williams
Vacant Title last held by Richard Williams	Commonwealth light middleweight champion 10 April 2004 – 26 June 2004	Succeeded by Ossie Duran
Vacant Title last held by Ciaran Healy	Irish light middleweight champion 5 July 2008 – 15 May 2009; Vacated	Vacant Title next held by Neil Sinclair
Preceded by Zaurbek Baysangurov	European light middleweight champion 6 March 2009 – 23 October 2009	Succeeded by Ryan Rhodes

== After retirement ==
Moore is co-founder of Maverick Stars Trust charity based in Walkden. It includes a boxing gym for all ages named Walkden ABC.
