= Ryan Rhodes =

British boxer

Personal information
- Nickname: Spice Boy
- Nationality: British
- Born: 20 November 1976 (age 50) Sheffield, South Yorkshire, England
- Height: 5 ft 8 1/2 in (174 cm)
- Weight: Light-middleweight; Middleweight

Boxing career
- Stance: Southpaw

Boxing record
- Total fights: 52
- Wins: 46
- Win by KO: 31
- Losses: 6

Ryan Rhodes (born 20 November 1976) is a British former professional boxer who competed from 1995 to 2012. He held the British super welterweight title twice, from 1996 to 1997 and in 2008, and the EBU European super welterweight title from 2009 to 2010. Additionally he challenged for the WBO middleweight title in 1997, and the WBC super welterweight title in 2011.

== Professional career ==
Rhodes took up boxing at a young age, training at Brendan Ingle's gym in the Wincobank district of Sheffield. At the age of 20, he defeated another Sheffield boxer Paul "Silky" Jones with a technical knock out in the eighth round to become the youngest post-war holder of the British title. He went on to win the belt outright in a record time of 90 days with wins over Peter Waudby and Del Bryan.

On 13 December 1997, Rhodes stepped up a weight division to middleweight to challenge the Canadian Otis Grant for the vacant WBO title but was defeated by a unanimous decision.

On 18 April 2008, Rhodes knocked out Gary Woolcombe 37 seconds into the 9th round to regain the British light middleweight title, 11 years after he first won it. He defended his title for the first time as the main event on the Hayemaker Promotions boxing show in Sheffield. His opponent was Jamie Coyle, whom he defeated by a unanimous decision.

Since then he has defeated Vincent Vuma of South Africa to win the WBC International light middleweight title and in doing so obtained a ranking in the top ten in the world.

Rhodes was due to defend his British light middleweight title against the Londoner Anthony Small at the Echo Arena in Liverpool on 28 March 2008, but withdrew because of an illness during his training camp.

He defeated Jamie Moore in the seventh round of their European title fight on 23 October 2009. He defended the title again on 21 May 2010 at home against the Italian Luca Messi, with a technical knock out in the sixth round.

Rhodes lost his WBC light middleweight challenge bout against Canelo Álvarez with a technical knockout in the twelfth round on 18 June 2011 in Guadalajara, Mexico.

Rhodes announced his retirement from professional boxing on 4 September 2012.

== Professional boxing record ==
52 fights	46 wins	6 losses
By knockout	31	4
By decision	15	2

No.	Result	Record	Opponent	Type	Round, time	Date	Location	Notes
52	Loss	46–6	Sergey Rabchenko	TKO	7 (12), 2:54	16 Jun 2012	Manchester Velodrome, Manchester, England	For vacant European light-middleweight title
51	Win	46–5	Sergey Khomitsky	PTS	8	26 Nov 2011	Magna Science Adventure Centre, Rotherham, England	
50	Loss	45–5	Canelo Álvarez	TKO	12 (12), 0:48	18 Jun 2011	Arena VFG, Guadalajara, Mexico	For WBC light-middleweight title
49	Win	45–4	Rocky Junior	TKO	2 (8), 2:28	4 Dec 2010	The Palace Hotel, Manchester, England	
48	Win	44–4	Luca Messi	TKO	6 (12), 1:09	21 May 2010	Ponds Forge, Sheffield, England	Retained European light-middleweight title
47	Win	43–4	Jamie Moore	TKO	7 (12), 2:35	23 Oct 2009	Bolton Arena, Bolton, England	Won European light-middleweight title
46	Win	42–4	Janos Petrovics	TKO	7 (8), 1:07	25 Apr 2009	Ulster Hall, Belfast, Northern Ireland	
45	Win	41–4	Vincent Vuma	UD	12	15 Nov 2008	The O2 Arena, London, England	Won WBC International light-middleweight title
44	Win	40–4	Jamie Coyle	UD	12	20 Sep 2008	Hillsborough Leisure Centre, Sheffield, England	Retained British light-middleweight title
43	Win	39–4	Gary Woolcombe	KO	9 (12), 0:37	18 Apr 2008	York Hall, London, England	Won British light-middleweight title
42	Win	38–4	Manoocha Salari	TKO	4 (10), 0:40	5 Dec 2007	Don Valley Stadium, Sheffield, England	
41	Win	37–4	Olufemi Moses	TKO	2 (6), 1:22	13 Oct 2007	Metrodome, Barnsley, Wales	
40	Win	36–4	Paul Buchanan	TKO	1 (8), 1:29	3 Jun 2007	Metrodome, Barnsley, Wales	
39	Loss	35–4	Gary Lockett	UD	12	8 Jul 2006	Millennium Stadium, Cardiff, Wales	For WBU middleweight title
38	Win	35–3	Jevgenijs Andrejevs	PTS	8	1 Jun 2006	Metrodome, Barnsley, England	
37	Win	34–3	Hussain Osman	RTD	4 (8), 3:00	25 Oct 2005	Guild Hall, Preston, England	
36	Win	33–3	Alan Gilbert	TKO	2 (6), 1:58	16 Jul 2005	Bolton Arena, Bolton, England	
35	Win	32–3	Craig Lynch	TKO	3 (6), 0:55	3 Jun 2005	MEN Arena, Manchester, England	
34	Win	31–3	Peter Jackson	PTS	6	22 Apr 2005	Metrodome, Barnsley, England	
33	Win	30–3	Tomas Da Silva	TKO	4 (6), 2:46	16 Apr 2004	Penningtons Nightclub, Bradford, England	
32	Win	29–3	Scott Dixon	PTS	8	12 Mar 2004	Nottingham Arena, Nottingham, England	
31	Win	28–3	Peter Jackson	PTS	6	11 Dec 2003	York Hall, London, England	
30	Win	27–3	Alan Gilbert	TKO	5 (6), 0:43	25 Jul 2003	Sports Village, Norwich, England	
29	Win	26–3	Paul Wesley	KO	3 (6), 2:00	16 Apr 2003	Nottingham Arena, Nottingham, England	
28	Loss	25–3	Lee Blundell	TKO	3 (10), 2:53	16 Mar 2002	York Hall, London, England	For vacant WBF (Federation) Intercontinental middleweight title
27	Win	25–2	Jason Collins	PTS	4	27 Oct 2001	MEN Arena, Manchester, England	
26	Win	24–2	Yuri Tsarenka	PTS	6	21 Jul 2001	Ponds Forge, Sheffield, England	
25	Win	23–2	Howard Clarke	PTS	6	16 Dec 2000	Sheffield Arena, Sheffield, England	
24	Win	22–2	Michael Alexander	PTS	6	21 Oct 2000	Wembley Conference Centre, London, England	
23	Win	21–2	Ojay Abrahams	PTS	6	16 May 2000	Spectrum Arena, Warrington, England	
22	Win	20–2	Eddie Haley	TKO	5 (8)	15 Jan 2000	The Dome Leisure Centre, Doncaster, England	
21	Loss	19–2	Jason Matthews	KO	2 (12), 0:28	17 Jul 1999	The Dome Leisure Centre, Doncaster, England	For vacant WBO interim middleweight title
20	Win	19–1	Peter Mason	TKO	1 (8), 3:00	27 Mar 1999	Storm Arena, Derby, England	
19	Win	18–1	Fidel Avendano	TKO	1 (12), 2:16	28 Nov 1998	Hillsborough Leisure Centre, Sheffield, England	Won vacant WBO Inter-Continental middleweight title
18	Win	17–1	Lorant Szabo	TKO	8 (12), 2:51	18 Jul 1998	Sheffield Arena, Sheffield, England	Won vacant WBO Inter-Continental light-middleweight title
17	Loss	16–1	Otis Grant	UD	12	13 Dec 1997	Ponds Forge, Sheffield, England	For vacant WBO middleweight title
16	Win	16–0	Yuri Epifantsev	TKO	2 (8), 2:53	11 Oct 1997	Sheffield Arena, Sheffield, England	
15	Win	15–0	Ed Griffin	TKO	2 (12), 2:04	2 Aug 1997	Metrodome, Barnsley, England	Won vacant IBF Inter-Continental light-middleweight title
14	Win	14–0	Lindon Scarlett	TKO	1 (8), 2:54	12 Apr 1997	Hillsborough Leisure Centre, Sheffield, England	
13	Win	13–0	Del Bryan	KO	7 (12), 1:54	14 Mar 1997	Rivermead Leisure Centre, Reading, England	Retained British light-middleweight title
12	Win	12–0	Peter Waudby	KO	1 (12), 1:58	25 Feb 1997	Hillsborough Leisure Centre, Sheffield, England	Retained British light-middleweight title
11	Win	11–0	Paul Jones	TKO	8 (12)	14 Dec 1996	Ponds Forge, Sheffield, England	Won vacant British light-middleweight title
10	Win	10–0	Del Bryan	PTS	6	14 Sep 1996	Concord Sports Centre, Sheffield, England	
9	Win	9–0	Roy Chipperfield	TKO	1 (6)	25 Jun 1996	Leisure Centre, Mansfield, England	
8	Win	8–0	Martin Jolley	TKO	2 (8)	11 May 1996	York Hall, London, England	
7	Win	7–0	Martin Jolley	KO	3 (6), 0:40	26 Jan 1996	Hilton Metropole, Brighton, England	
6	Win	6–0	John Duckworth	TKO	2 (6), 2:41	20 Jan 1996	Leisure Centre, Mansfield, England	
5	Win	5–0	Mark Lee Dawson	PTS	6	10 Nov 1995	Moorways Leisure Centre, Derby, England	
4	Win	4–0	John Rice	TKO	2 (6)	15 Sep 1995	Leisure Centre, Mansfield, England	
3	Win	3–0	Chris Richards	PTS	6	6 May 1995	Royal Bath and West Show, Shepton Mallet, England	
2	Win	2–0	Seamus Casey	KO	1 (6), 1:52	4 Mar 1995	Forum, Livingston, Scotland	
1	Win	1–0	Lee Crocker	TKO	2 (6)	4 Feb 1995	National Ice Rink, Cardiff, Wales	Professional debut

Sporting positions
Regional boxing titles
Vacant Title last held by Ensley Bingham	British light-middleweight champion 14 December 1996 – December 1997; Vacated	Vacant Title next held by Ensley Bingham
Vacant Title last held by Quirino Garcia	IBF Inter-Continental light-middleweight champion 2 August 1997 – December 1997; Vacated	Vacant Title next held by Akhmet Dottuev
Vacant Title last held by Adrian Dodson	WBO Inter-Continental light-middleweight champion 18 July 1998 – 28 November 1998; Vacated	Vacant Title next held by Anthony Farnell
Vacant Title last held by Lorant Szabo	WBO Inter-Continental middleweight champion 28 November 1998 – 17 July 1999; Lost bid for interim world title	Vacant Title next held by András Gálfi
Preceded by Gary Woolcombe	British light-middleweight champion 18 April 2008 – July 2009; Vacated	Vacant Title next held by Anthony Small
Preceded by Vincent Vuma	WBC International light-middleweight champion 15 November 2008 – October 2009; Vacated	Vacant Title next held by Sherzod Husanov
Preceded by Jamie Moore	European light-middleweight champion 23 October 2009 – September 2010; Vacated	Vacant Title next held by Lukáš Konečný
