= Armand Krajnc =

Swedish boxer

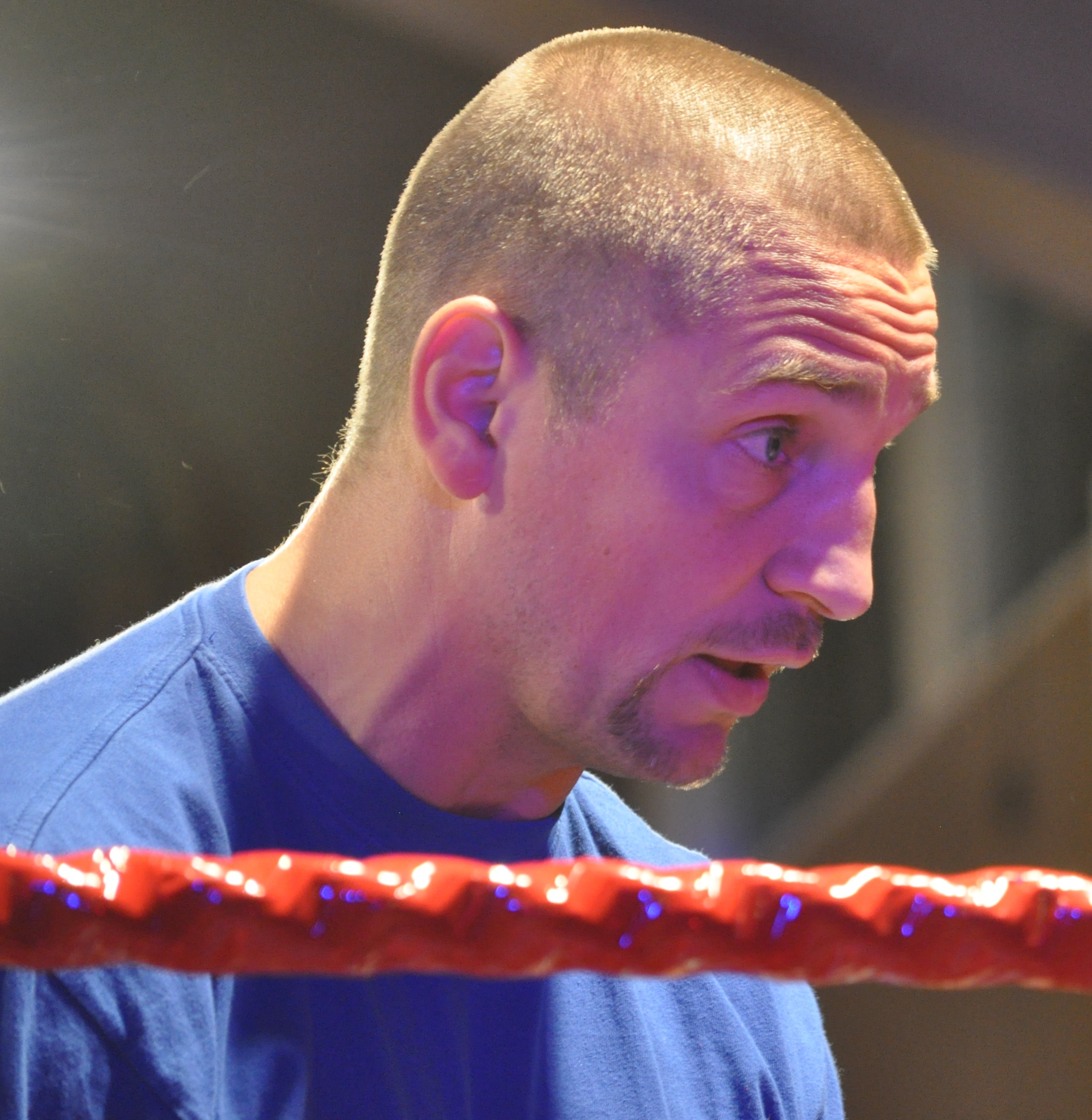
- Armand Krajnc

Personal information
- Nickname: Lion
- Nationality: Swedish
- Born: 7 August 1973 Landskrona, Scania, Sweden
- Height: 1.81 m (5 ft 11 in)
- Weight: Middleweight; Super-middleweight

Boxing career
- Reach: 191 cm (75 in)
- Stance: Orthodox

Boxing record
- Total fights: 32
- Wins: 29
- Win by KO: 21
- Losses: 3

Armand Krajnc (born 7 August 1973) is a former Swedish professional boxer who competed from 1996 to 2004. He held the WBO middleweight title from 1999 to 2002, and challenged once for the unified WBA (Super) and IBF super-middleweight titles in his final fight in 2004.

== Early life ==
Krajnc's parents emigrated from Slovenia in the former Yugoslavia to southernmost Sweden, Scania before he was born. Before his professional career, he obtained first Dan, represented by the Black Belt, within the Karate style of Shotokan. This prepared him to become a hard-hitting boxer. When he began his professional career he moved to Malmö and commuted on a weekly basis to his new German boxing club and promoter in Lübeck in northern Germany.

== Professional career ==
Known as "Lion", Krajnc turned pro in 1996, moving to Lübeck and signing up for a German promoter to avoid the Swedish ban on professional boxing. Three years later, in 1999, he won the WBO Middleweight Title by technical knock out (TKO) against Jason Matthews. Krajnc defended the title three times, before losing it to Harry Simon in 2002.

One of Krajnc's title defenses was against the Stockholm celebrity and fellow Swede Paolo Roberto. Krajnc had a low personal opinion of the latter and there was considerably controversy preceding the fight. For instance, Krajnc once compared Roberto to a fjolla (sissy) and stated that Roberto had better talents in painting female toes, referencing an appearance by Roberto in a Swedish commercial TV-program. It was primarily Roberto's entertainment appearances in television, which Krajnc obviously found unfitting a professional boxer.

Based strictly on his boxing record, Roberto was unlikely to receive a title shot, and the personal animosity contributed to the fight being made. 3 November 2001, the match was held in Kranjc home arena in Germany. The distance between Lübeck and Scania is fairly short, and between 1500 and 2000 Scanian fans had met up in Lübeck, in order to, together with his German supporters, give their best possible support for Krajnc. Roberto, who was well-known from Swedish television, not only for boxing, would rather have met Krajnc in Mariehamn, Åland. But the challenger couldn't choose location of this event. Which in Sweden became a very media covered event (though the ban on professional boxing made it impossible to televise it live).

Against a combination of joined Germans and Scanias supporters, Roberto's worst assumptions regarding the crowd, proved to be true. He was "the crook" - and Krajnc "the hero", only a few Swedish journalists from Stockholm presumably held on Roberto. Surprisingly the challenger, who before this fight had put on a great deal of muscles, took the fight to the cards. Here, however, Kranjc won easily and unanimously, while Aftonbladet columnist Lars Angrell wrote "Why wasn't the assaulting beatings of Paolo Roberto stopped !?". After the match Kranjc was magnanimous towards Roberto at the press conference, and claimed Paolo Roberto as a great boxer. Their enmity ended with the match, and so did the ban on limited professional boxing after a total prohibition over a period of more than 30 years.

In June 2001 Krajnc vacated his WBO title after a dispute with promotional group Universum Box-Promotion, but was later reinstated as champion by the WBO. In 2004 he challenged WBA and IBF Super Middleweight Title holder Sven Ottke but lost a decision.

== Life after boxing ==
Krajnc nowadays lives in Ystad, also in Scania where he teaches boxing to youngsters. He's also competed in the tv-series Mästarnas mästare (Champion of Champions), which he also won.

== Professional boxing record ==
32 fights	29 wins	3 losses
By knockout	21	1
By decision	8	2

No.	Result	Record	Opponent	Type	Round, time	Date	Location	Notes
32	Loss	29–3	(Germany) Sven Ottke	UD	12	27 Mar 2004	Bordelandhalle, Magdeburg, Germany	For WBA (Unified) and IBF super-middleweight titles
31	Win	29–2	(Germany) Andy Liebing	TKO	4 (8)	13 Dec 2003	Nuremberg Arena, Nuremberg, Germany	
30	Win	28–2	(Hungary) Peter Zsilak	TKO	2 (8), 1:30	4 Oct 2003	Stadthalle, Zwickau, Germany	
29	Win	27–2	(Portugal) Eliseo Nogueira	PTS	8	25 Apr 2003	Maritim Hotel, Magdeburg, Germany	
28	Loss	26–2	(Russia) Sergey Tatevosyan	TKO	7 (10), 2:28	14 Sep 2002	Volkswagen Halle, Braunschweig, Germany	
27	Loss	26–1	(Namibia) Harry Simon	UD	12	6 Apr 2002	Cirkusbygningen, Copenhagen, Denmark	Lost WBO middleweight title
26	Win	26–0	(Sweden) Paolo Roberto	UD	12	3 Nov 2001	Hansehalle, Lübeck, Germany	Retained WBO middleweight title
25	Win	25–0	(Albania) Artur Drinaj	KO	3 (8), 1:37	28 Jul 2001	Estrel Convention Center, Neukölln, Germany	
24	Win	24–0	(Germany) Bert Schenk	TKO	6 (12), 2:51	7 Oct 2000	Estrel Convention Center, Neukölln, Germany	Retained WBO middleweight title
23	Win	23–0	(United States) Jonathan Corn	KO	2 (12), 1:29	11 Mar 2000	Hansehalle, Lübeck, Germany	Retained WBO middleweight title
22	Win	22–0	(United Kingdom) Jason Matthews	TKO	8 (12), 1:45	27 Nov 1999	Hansehalle, Lübeck, Germany	Won WBO middleweight title
21	Win	21–0	(Germany) Peter Kluge	TKO	5 (8)	18 Sep 1999	Maritim Hotel, Stuttgart, Germany	
20	Win	20–0	(Belgium) Michel Simeon	KO	3 (8)	10 Jul 1999	Sporthalle, Augsburg, Germany	
19	Win	19–0	(Romania) Christian Velea	TKO	3 (10), 1:25	24 Apr 1999	Circus Krone, Munich, Germany	Retained German International BDB middleweight title
18	Win	18–0	(Hungary) Csaba Olah	PTS	6	13 Mar 1999	Hansehalle, Lübeck, Germany	
17	Win	17–0	(United States) James McCray	TKO	3 (8)	13 Feb 1999	Maritim Hotel, Stuttgart, Germany	
16	Win	16–0	(United States) Anthony Ivory	PTS	8	28 Nov 1998	Hansehalle, Lübeck, Germany	
15	Win	15–0	(United States) Leroy Owens	PTS	8	14 Nov 1998	Circus Krone, Munich, Germany	
14	Win	14–0	(France) Jean Paul D'Alessandro	TKO	5 (6), 1:55	24 Oct 1998	Alsterdorfer Sporthalle, Alsterdorf, Hamburg, Germany	
13	Win	13–0	(Belgium) Danny Defevere	TKO	2 (8)	2 May 1998	Hansehalle, Lübeck, Germany	
12	Win	12–0	(Albania) Bahre Ahmeti	SD	8	14 Mar 1998	Sporthalle, Wandsbek, Hamburg, Germany	
11	Win	11–0	(Croatia) Vedran Akrap	PTS	10	14 Feb 1998	Maritim Hotel, Stuttgart, Germany	Won vacant German International BDB middleweight title
10	Win	10–0	(France) Mimoun Khadda	KO	2 (8)	20 Dec 1997	Oberrheinhalle, Offenburg, Germany	
9	Win	9–0	(Algeria) Djaafar Filali	KO	3 (6)	11 Oct 1997	Stadthalle, Cottbus, Brandenburg, Germany	
8	Win	8–0	(Hungary) Gyorgy Mizsei	PTS	6	7 Sep 1997	Universum Gym, Wandsbek, Hamburg, Germany	
7	Win	7–0	(Algeria) Youssef Bakhouche	TKO	2	14 Jun 1997	Saaltheater Geulen, Aachen, Germany	
6	Win	6–0	(Hungary) Stefan Magyar	TKO	2	26 Apr 1997	Hallenstadion, Zürich, Switzerland	
5	Win	5–0	(Hungary) Lajos Patko	KO	1 (6), 1:34	8 Mar 1997	Sartory-Saal, Cologne, Germany	
4	Win	4–0	(Slovakia) Gejza Stipak	TKO	1	11 Jan 1997	Sport und Erholungszentrum, Friedrichshain, Berlin, Germany	
3	Win	3–0	(Slovakia) Anton Lascek	TKO	1	16 Dec 1996	Universum Gym, Wandsbek, Hamburg, Germany	
2	Win	2–0	(Belgium) Francesco Fiorentino	TKO	2	13 Dec 1996	Stadionsporthalle, Hanover, Germany	
1	Win	1–0	(Democratic Republic of the Congo) Ferousi Ilunga	KO	3	5 Oct 1996	Sartory-Saal, Cologne, Germany	

Preceded by Jason Matthews	WBO Middleweight boxing champion 27 Nov 1999–4 Apr 2002	Succeeded by Harry Simon
