= Scott Dixon (disambiguation) =

Scott Dixon (born 1980) is a racing driver.

Scott Dixon may also refer to:

- Scott Dixon (boxer) (born 1976), Scottish former professional boxer
- Scott Dixon (biathlete) from 2012–13 Biathlon World Cup – World Cup 4
