= Wayne Alexander =

Wayne Alexander may refer to:

- Wayne Alexander (actor), American actor
- Wayne Alexander (boxer) (born 1973), British boxer
