= Harry Simon (boxer) =

Namibian boxer (born 1971)

Personal information
- Nicknames: The Terminator; Onkugo
- Born: 21 October 1971 (age 54) Walvis Bay, Namibia
- Height: 5 ft 10 in (178 cm)
- Weight: Light middleweight; Middleweight; Light heavyweight

Boxing career
- Reach: 70 in (178 cm)
- Stance: Orthodox

Boxing record
- Total fights: 31
- Wins: 31
- Win by KO: 23
Medal record
Men's Boxing
Representing Namibia
All-Africa Games
Gold medal – first place	1991 Cairo	Welterweight

Harry Simon (born 21 October 1971) is a Namibian former professional boxer. He is a world champion in two weight classes, having held the World Boxing Organization (WBO) junior middleweight title from 1998 to 2001, and the WBO middleweight title in 2002.

In 2002, Simon was involved in a serious car crash. He was found guilty of "culpable homicide" and sentenced to jail in 2007. Simon was released in 2009. He lost his world middleweight title owing to injuries sustained from the car accident, being stripped of the belt for failure to defend it.

In 2013 Simon won the vacant IBF International Light Heavyweight title against Geard Ajetović, and defended it against him again in 2014.

He retired undefeated with a record of 31–0–0, with 23 wins by way of knockout.

== Amateur highlights ==
As an amateur Simon represented Namibia as a welterweight at the 1992 Summer Olympics in Barcelona, Spain, and had an overall amateur record of 121–9. His result was:

- Lost to Aníbal Acevedo (Puerto Rico) 11–13

== Professional career ==
Simon turned pro in 1994 and won the WBO junior middleweight title in 1998 by defeating Winky Wright by controversial decision. The bout had initially been ruled a draw, but then a "scoring error" favoring Simon was discovered. He defended the title four times against Kevin Lueshing, Enrique Areco, Rodney Jones and Wayne Alexander. He later captured the WBO middleweight title against Sweden's Armand Krajnc in a unanimous 12-round decision. In 2002, Simon was involved in a serious car accident, sustaining injuries that prevented his defending his title; because of this he was stripped of the belt.

Simon returned to boxing in March 2007, winning an eight round decision over Stephen Nzuemb, in Namibia. He won a fight against Tanzanian Rashid Mutumla by knockout on 2 December 2010. Following his release from jail in 2009, Simon launched a comeback, recording several wins over journeyman opposition.

On 24 November 2018 Simon fought together with his son, Harry Simon Jr. They both won their fights, making it a first in Namibia for father and son to appear together, and to both win.

== Professional boxing record ==
31 fights	31 wins	0 losses
By knockout	23	0
By decision	8	0

No.	Result	Record	Opponent	Type	Round, time	Date	Location	Notes
31	Win	31–0	Kaminjah Ramadhan	TKO	2 (8)	Nov 24, 2018	Ramatex Factory, Windhoek, Namibia	
30	Win	30–0	Japhet Kaseba	TKO	2 (8)	Mar 26, 2016	Helao Nafidi Business Expo Hall, Helao Nafidi, Namibia	
29	Win	29–0	Geard Ajetović	UD	12	Sep 28, 2013	Ramatex Factory, Windhoek, Namibia	Won vacant IBF International light heavyweight title
28	Win	28–0	Zoltan Kiss, Jr.	TKO	2 (8) 2:33	Jun 29, 2013	Windhoek Country Club Resort, Windhoek, Namibia	
27	Win	27–0	Ruben Groenewald	TKO	1 (12) 1:23	Jun 23, 2012	SKW Hall, Windhoek, Namibia	
26	Win	26–0	Rashid Matumla	KO	1 (10) 1:43	Dec 4, 2010	OK Parking Lot, Windhoek, Namibia	
25	Win	25–0	Daniel Wanyonyi	TKO	5 (6)	Feb 20, 2010	Simmers Restaurant, Nairobi, Kenya	
24	Win	24–0	Stephen Nzuemba	UD	12	Mar 3, 2007	Sam Nujoma Stadium, Windhoek, Namibia	
23	Win	23–0	Armand Krajnc	UD	12	Apr 6, 2002	Circus Building, Copenhagen, Denmark	Won WBO middleweight title
22	Win	22–0	Hacine Cherifi	UD	12	Jul 21, 2001	Coliseo Rubén Rodríguez, Bayamón, Puerto Rico	Won WBO interim middleweight title
21	Win	21–0	Wayne Alexander	TKO	5 (12) 2:43	Feb 10, 2001	Kingsway Leisure Centre, Widnes, England	Retained WBO junior middleweight title
20	Win	20–0	Rodney Jones	MD	12	Sep 23, 2000	Casino Rama, Rama, Ontario, Canada	Retained WBO junior middleweight title
19	Win	19–0	Enrique Areco	TKO	10 (12)	Feb 19, 2000	Goresbrook Leisure Centre, London, England	Retained WBO junior middleweight title
18	Win	18–0	Kevin Lueshing	TKO	3 (12) 2:08	May 1, 1999	Crystal Palace National Sports Centre, London, England	Retained WBO junior middleweight title
17	Win	17–0	Winky Wright	MD	12	Aug 22, 1998	Carousel Casino, Hammanskraal, South Africa	Won WBO junior middleweight title
16	Win	16–0	Kasi Kaihau	KO	4 (10) 1:12	Dec 22, 1997	Ponds Forge, Sheffield, England	
15	Win	15–0	George Richards	KO	5 (8) 2:37	Jul 19, 1997	Wembley Arena, London, England	
14	Win	14–0	Nick Odore	KO	5 (6) 2:37	May 3, 1997	NYNEX Arena, Manchester, England	
13	Win	13–0	John Bosco	KO	2 (8) 1:48	Feb 8, 1997	London Arena, London, England	
12	Win	12–0	Anthony Ivory	PTS	6	Aug 31, 1996	Point Theatre, Dublin, Ireland	
11	Win	11–0	Del Bryan	TKO	6 (10)	Jul 6, 1996	NYNEX Arena, Manchester, England	
10	Win	10–0	Paul Wesley	RTD	4 (8) 3:00	Apr 13, 1996	Wythenshawe Forum, Manchester, England	
9	Win	9–0	José María Cabral	KO	6 (10)	Sep 23, 1995	Vista University Indoor Centre, Bloemfontein, South Africa	
8	Win	8–0	Danny Chavez	PTS	10	Jul 8, 1995	Wembley Indoor Arena, Johannesburg, South Africa	
7	Win	7–0	Ernest Goliath	TKO	1 (8)	May 12, 1995	Berea Park Arena, Pretoria, South Africa	
6	Win	6–0	Enuel Marshile	TKO	5 (8)	Mar 15, 1995	Morula Sun Casino, Mabopane, South Africa	
5	Win	5–0	Paul Nhlumayo	TKO	2 (6)	Dec 21, 1994	DLI Hall, Durban, South Africa	
4	Win	4–0	Thandekile Boyana	TKO	4	Nov 20, 1994	Wembley Indoor Arena, Johannesburg, South Africa	
3	Win	3–0	Petros Twala	TKO	2 (4)	Mar 26, 1994	Indoor Centre, Springs, South Africa	
2	Win	2–0	Thabiso Dlamini	KO	1 (4)	Mar 5, 1994	Ringwise Boxing Academy, Johannesburg, South Africa	
1	Win	1–0	Leon Van Rensburg	TKO	1 (4)	Jan 26, 1994	Indoor Centre, Springs, South Africa	

== Outside the ring ==
Simon was involved in two serious car accidents resulting in fatalities. In the first accident in 2001, two people died outside Swakopmund in a hit-and-run accident. Simon's car's estimated speed was 230 kilometres per hour (140 mph). Some controversy developed around this accident, as blood samples disappeared, and originally Simon was reported to be driving. His driver later admitted to have steered the vehicle and was sentenced to 2 years in jail.

The second accident, in late 2002, saw Simon seriously injured and eventually sent to jail. Three Belgian tourists - two adults and a baby - died in the collision with Simon's Mercedes-Benz at Langstrand in November 2002. On 5 August 2005, Simon was given a two-year jail sentence, after he was found guilty of culpable homicide stemming from the November 2002 car accident, which resulted in the deaths of the three people.

On 9 July 2007, Simon began serving his two-year prison sentence for culpable homicide after losing the appeal of his 2005 conviction. Simon did not call any witnesses or testify in his own behalf during the appeal proceedings, and his conviction and sentence were not overturned. He was released in 2009. In 2020 he published a book, "Lifestyle and Treatments in Prison", detailing his experiences in jail.

== See also ==
- List of world light-middleweight boxing champions
- List of world middleweight boxing champions
- List of undefeated world boxing champions

Sporting positions
Regional boxing titles
Vacant Title last held by Cornelius White	IBF International light-heavyweight champion 28 September 2013 – 2014; Vacated	Vacant Title next held by Karo Murat
World boxing titles
Preceded by Winky Wright	WBO light-middleweight champion 22 August 1998 – 27 November 2001; Vacated	Vacant Title next held by Daniel Santos
Vacant Title last held by Jason Matthews	WBO middleweight champion Interim title 21 July 2001 – 6 April 2002; Won full title	Vacant Title next held by Héctor Javier Velazco
Preceded by Armand Krajnc	WBO middleweight champion 6 April 2002 – 8 July 2003; Stripped	Succeeded by Héctor Javier Velazco promoted from interim status
