= 1967–68 Segunda División =

37th season of the second-tier football league in Spain

Segunda División
- Season: 1967–68
- Champions: Deportivo La Coruña; Granada
- Promoted: Deportivo La Coruña; Granada
- Relegated: Atlético Ceuta; Badalona; Tenerife; Langreo; Castellón; Real Santander; Jaén; Lérida; Xerez; Badajoz; Recreativo; Europa; Levante; Osasuna; Hércules; Gimnástica Torrelavega; Constancia
- Matches: 480
- Goals: 1,173 (2.44 per match)
- Top goalscorer: Abel Fernández; Cesáreo Rivera (17 goals)
- Best goalkeeper: Ñito (0.67 goals/match)
- Biggest home win: Mestalla 8–0 Constancia (3 February 1968)
- Biggest away win: Constancia 0–3 Mestalla (8 October 1967); Langreo 1–4 Badalona (21 January 1968); Burgos 1–4 Deportivo La Coruña (4 February 1968); Constancia 0–3 Calvo Sotelo (17 March 1968); Constancia 0–3 Cádiz (7 April 1968)
- Highest scoring: Real Gijón 8–2 Badajoz (31 December 1967)

The 1967–68 Segunda División season was the 37th since its establishment and was played between 10 September 1967 and 28 April 1968.

== Overview before the season ==
32 teams joined the league, including 3 relegated from the 1966–67 La Liga and 4 promoted from the 1966–67 Tercera División.

Relegated from La Liga

- Granada
- Hércules
- Deportivo La Coruña

Promoted from Tercera División

- Alcoyano
- Jaén
- Xerez
- Badajoz

== Group North ==
=== Teams ===
Location of teams in Segunda División 1967-68 Group North

Club	City	Stadium
CD Badajoz	Badajoz	El Vivero
CF Badalona	Badalona	Avenida de Navarra
Burgos CF	Burgos	El Plantío
RC Celta Vigo	Vigo	Balaídos
RC Deportivo La Coruña	La Coruña	Riazor
CD Europa	Barcelona	Cerdeña
Club Ferrol	Ferrol	Manuel Rivera
Real Gijón	Gijón	El Molinón
Gimnástica de Torrelavega	Torrelavega	El Malecón
UP Langreo	Langreo	Ganzábal
UD Lérida	Lérida	Campo de Deportes
CA Osasuna	Pamplona	El Sadar
Real Oviedo	Oviedo	Carlos Tartiere
Rayo Vallecano	Madrid	Vallecas
Real Santander	Santander	El Sardinero
Real Valladolid	Valladolid	José Zorrilla

=== League table ===
Pos	Team	Pld	W	D	L	GF	GA	GD	Pts	Promotion, qualification or relegation
1	Deportivo La Coruña (P)	30	18	7	5	53	29	+24	43	Promotion to La Liga
2	Valladolid	30	17	7	6	48	27	+21	41	Qualification for the promotion playoffs
3	Celta Vigo	30	15	6	9	57	33	+24	36 (Note: Celta Vigo finished ahead of Rayo Vallecano on head-to-head points: Rayo Vallecano–Celta Vigo 1–2, Celta Vigo–Rayo Vallecano 1–0)	
4	Rayo Vallecano	30	15	6	9	44	39	+5	36	
5	Real Gijón	30	13	8	9	47	38	+9	34	
6	Oviedo	30	12	8	10	43	29	+14	32 (Note: Oviedo finished ahead of Ferrol and Burgos on head-to-head points: Oviedo 6 pts, Ferrol 4 pts, Burgos 2 pts)	
7	Ferrol (O)	30	13	6	11	42	37	+5	32	Qualification for the relegation playoffs
8	Burgos (O)	30	11	10	9	34	35	−1	32	Qualification for the relegation playoffs
9	Badalona (R)	30	12	6	12	44	30	+14	30	Relegation to Tercera División
10	Langreo (R)	30	12	4	14	32	37	−5	28	Relegation to Tercera División
11	Real Santander (R)	30	11	5	14	39	38	+1	27	Relegation to Tercera División
12	Lérida (R)	30	8	8	14	25	51	−26	24	Relegation to Tercera División
13	Badajoz (R)	30	10	2	18	31	52	−21	22	Relegation to Tercera División
14	Europa (R)	30	8	5	17	32	56	−24	21 (Note: Europa finished ahead of Osasuna and Gimnástica Torrelavega on head-to-head points: Europa 5 pts, Osasuna 4 pts, Gimnástica Torrelavega 3 pts)	Relegation to Tercera División
15	Osasuna (R)	30	7	7	16	31	48	−17	21	Relegation to Tercera División
16	Gimnástica Torrelavega (R)	30	7	7	16	25	48	−23	21	Relegation to Tercera División

Source: BDFútbol
Rules for classification: 1) points; 2) head-to-head points; 3) head-to-head goal difference; 4) goal difference; 5) number of goals scored
(O) Play-off winners; (P) Promoted; (R) Relegated

=== Top goalscorers ===
Goalscorers	Goals	Team
(Spain) Abel Fernández	17	Celta Vigo
(Spain) Cesáreo Rivera	17	Celta Vigo
(Spain) Germán Muiños	16	Ferrol
(Spain) Toni Grande	14	Rayo Vallecano
(Spain) José María Ilundain	13	Badalona

=== Top goalkeepers ===
Goalkeeper	Goals	Matches	Average	Team
(Spain) Jesús Aguilar	26	29	0.9	Valladolid
(Spain) José Manuel Nieves	23	22	1.05	Langreo
(Spain) Carlos García	28	25	1.12	Real Gijón
(Spain) Juan Zumalabe	28	25	1.12	Ferrol
(Spain) José Ramón Ibarreche	26	23	1.13	Celta Vigo

=== Results ===
Home \ Away	BDJ	BDL	BUR	CEL	DEP	EUR	FER	GIJ	GIM	LAN	LÉR	OSA	OVI	RAY	SAT	VLD
Badajoz	—	1–0	4–2	0–0	0–1	2–1	2–1	3–0	1–0	2–1	0–2	0–1	2–0	0–2	2–1	2–1
Badalona	2–1	—	2–0	1–0	2–3	1–1	4–0	3–0	2–0	0–1	3–0	4–0	0–0	5–2	2–0	1–1
Burgos	1–0	3–1	—	1–0	1–4	0–0	2–0	2–0	2–0	2–0	3–1	3–1	2–3	1–1	1–0	2–2
Celta Vigo	2–1	1–0	0–0	—	3–2	7–2	3–1	4–2	5–0	1–0	6–0	2–0	1–1	1–0	6–1	1–2
Deportivo	2–1	2–2	1–1	1–0	—	6–1	1–3	3–1	3–1	3–2	3–1	1–0	2–1	0–1	1–1	2–0
Europa	4–0	0–2	0–0	2–1	1–0	—	2–0	1–2	3–0	2–1	0–1	3–0	2–4	0–0	2–1	0–2
Ferrol	3–0	1–0	3–0	2–2	1–1	3–0	—	2–0	2–2	3–1	1–0	3–1	3–1	0–1	2–1	2–1
Gijón	8–2	1–0	1–1	2–1	1–0	1–0	2–2	—	3–1	0–0	6–0	3–0	1–0	3–0	1–1	3–2
Gimn. Torrelavega	3–2	2–1	0–0	3–2	1–1	2–1	0–1	1–2	—	2–2	2–1	0–0	0–3	2–0	1–0	0–1
Langreo	2–0	1–4	0–0	0–1	0–1	1–0	3–2	2–1	2–1	—	1–0	0–1	1–0	1–2	2–0	2–2
Lérida	2–2	1–1	1–1	1–1	0–2	2–0	2–0	0–0	0–0	2–1	—	2–1	1–1	1–1	0–1	3–1
Osasuna	3–0	3–0	0–2	0–1	2–3	1–1	1–1	1–1	1–0	0–1	5–0	—	0–0	1–1	2–2	2–1
Oviedo	2–0	2–0	4–0	1–1	0–1	5–0	2–0	1–1	0–0	0–2	2–0	1–0	—	4–0	2–0	0–2
Rayo Vallecano	2–1	1–0	2–1	1–2	0–2	3–1	1–0	1–1	4–0	3–1	2–0	5–1	3–1	—	3–1	2–2
Santander	1–0	1–1	2–0	3–2	0–0	6–1	1–0	3–0	1–0	0–1	0–1	3–2	3–1	5–0	—	0–1
Valladolid	2–0	1–0	2–0	3–0	1–1	2–1	0–0	1–0	2–1	2–0	4–0	4–1	1–1	1–0	1–0	—

Source: BDFútbol
Legend: Blue = home team win; Yellow = draw; Red = away team win.

== Group South ==
=== Teams ===
Location of teams in Segunda División 1967-68 Group South
Canary Islands

Club	City	Stadium
CD Alcoyano	Alcoy	El Collao
Cádiz CF	Cádiz	Ramón de Carranza
CF Calvo Sotelo	Puertollano	Calvo Sotelo
CD Castellón	Castellón de la Plana	Castalia
Atlético Ceuta	Ceuta	Alfonso Murube
CD Constancia	Inca	Campo Nuevo
Granada CF	Granada	Los Cármenes
Hércules CF	Alicante	La Viña
Real Jaén	Jaén	La Victoria
Levante UD	Valencia	Vallejo
RCD Mallorca	Palma de Mallorca	Luis Sitjar
CD Mestalla	Valencia	Mestalla
Real Murcia	Murcia	La Condomina
Recreativo de Huelva	Huelva	Municipal
CD Tenerife	Santa Cruz de Tenerife	Heliodoro Rodríguez López
Xerez CD	Jerez de la Frontera	Domecq

=== League table ===
Pos	Team	Pld	W	D	L	GF	GA	GD	Pts	Promotion, qualification or relegation
1	Granada (P)	30	17	6	7	42	20	+22	40	Promotion to La Liga
2	Calvo Sotelo	30	17	5	8	46	24	+22	39	Qualification for the promotion playoffs
3	Alcoyano	30	15	7	8	37	33	+4	37	
4	Mallorca	30	13	9	8	36	24	+12	35	
5	Cádiz	30	13	7	10	37	30	+7	33	
6	Murcia	30	10	12	8	31	23	+8	32	
7	Atlético Ceuta (R)	30	12	7	11	34	38	−4	31	Qualification for the relegation playoffs
8	Mestalla (O)	30	14	2	14	47	31	+16	30 (Note: Mestalla finished ahead of Tenerife on overall goal difference)	Qualification for the relegation playoffs
9	Tenerife (R)	30	11	8	11	39	33	+6	30	Relegation to Tercera División
10	Castellón (R)	30	9	10	11	27	30	−3	28	Relegation to Tercera División
11	Jaén (R)	30	8	11	11	32	41	−9	27 (Note: Jaén finished ahead of Xerez on head-to-head points: Jaén–Xerez 2–0, Xerez–Jaén 0–0)	Relegation to Tercera División
12	Xerez (R)	30	9	9	12	28	40	−12	27	Relegation to Tercera División
13	Recreativo (R)	30	8	10	12	25	26	−1	26	Relegation to Tercera División
14	Levante (R)	30	7	11	12	26	37	−11	25 (Note: Levante finished ahead of Hércules on head-to-head points: Levante–Hércules 2–1, Hércules–Levante 1–1)	Relegation to Tercera División
15	Hércules (R)	30	11	3	16	40	41	−1	25	Relegation to Tercera División
16	Constancia (R)	30	5	5	20	19	75	−56	15	Relegation to Tercera División

Source: BDFútbol
Rules for classification: 1) points; 2) head-to-head points; 3) head-to-head goal difference; 4) goal difference; 5) number of goals scored
(O) Play-off winners; (P) Promoted; (R) Relegated

=== Top goalscorers ===
Goalscorers	Goals	Team
(Spain) José Antonio Barrios	15	Tenerife
(Spain) Ernesto Domínguez	14	Mallorca
(Paraguay) Joaquín Martínez	12	Mestalla
(Spain) José Antonio Ureña	11	Granada
(Spain) Antonio Conesa	11	Jaén

=== Top goalkeepers ===
Goalkeeper	Goals	Matches	Average	Team
(Spain) Ñito	20	30	0.67	Granada
(Spain) Jose Luis Borja	23	30	0.77	Murcia
(Spain) Eduardo García	24	30	0.8	Calvo Sotelo
(Spain) José Antonio Omist	21	23	0.91	Recreativo
(Spain) José Bermúdez	30	30	1	Cádiz

=== Results ===
Home \ Away	ALC	CÁD	CAL	CAS	CEU	CON	GRA	HÉR	JAÉ	LEV	MLL	MES	MUR	REC	TEN	XER
Alcoyano	—	1–1	1–0	1–0	1–0	2–2	3–2	1–0	4–1	2–1	0–0	1–0	2–1	3–2	2–1	4–1
Cádiz	2–0	—	4–1	0–0	2–1	4–1	1–0	3–1	2–2	2–0	0–0	1–0	1–0	0–1	2–1	0–0
Calvo Sotelo	1–1	2–1	—	5–1	2–0	2–1	2–1	3–0	4–3	2–0	0–0	1–0	2–0	1–0	4–0	2–0
Castellón	0–0	0–0	0–2	—	3–1	3–0	1–0	2–1	1–1	1–0	1–2	3–2	1–0	1–1	3–1	1–0
Atlético Ceuta	3–1	2–1	2–0	1–0	—	2–0	1–1	2–1	2–2	3–0	1–0	1–1	2–2	1–0	0–0	2–0
Constancia	0–1	0–3	0–3	1–1	1–2	—	0–1	3–2	1–1	1–0	0–2	0–3	1–0	2–1	2–1	2–2
Granada	1–0	1–0	1–0	1–0	3–1	6–0	—	1–0	3–0	1–0	3–0	0–1	1–0	0–0	2–1	3–0
Hércules	1–3	2–1	1–1	1–0	6–0	2–0	3–4	—	4–0	1–1	3–0	3–1	0–1	1–0	1–0	2–1
Jaén	2–0	3–2	1–0	2–1	0–2	3–0	0–0	2–0	—	2–2	0–0	2–3	1–1	1–0	0–1	2–0
Levante	0–0	3–2	1–1	0–0	3–0	1–1	2–1	2–1	1–0	—	1–1	2–1	2–2	0–0	1–0	1–1
Mallorca	3–0	0–1	1–1	2–0	0–0	6–0	1–0	0–1	3–1	2–0	—	1–0	1–1	1–0	3–0	3–0
Mestalla	3–0	4–0	1–0	1–1	1–0	8–0	0–1	2–0	2–0	2–0	3–1	—	3–1	0–2	1–0	0–1
Murcia	0–0	0–0	1–0	2–1	1–0	5–0	0–0	0–0	0–0	3–1	4–0	3–1	—	1–0	0–2	0–0
Recreativo	1–2	0–1	1–2	1–0	1–1	2–0	1–2	1–0	0–0	2–0	0–0	2–1	0–0	—	1–1	1–0
Tenerife	1–0	3–0	1–0	0–0	4–1	4–0	0–0	4–1	2–0	1–1	2–0	2–1	0–0	3–3	—	0–1
Xerez	3–1	1–0	0–2	1–1	1–0	2–0	2–2	2–1	0–0	1–0	1–3	2–1	1–2	1–1	3–3	—

Source: BDFútbol
Legend: Blue = home team win; Yellow = draw; Red = away team win.

== Promotion playoffs ==
=== First leg ===
26 May 1968	Córdoba	3–0	Calvo Sotelo	Córdoba
	Navarro 36'; Arana 65'; López 69'	Report		Stadium: El Arcángel; Referee: Gardeazabal Garay

9 June 1968	Valladolid	0–1	Real Sociedad	Valladolid
		Report	Boronat 73'	Stadium: José Zorrilla; Referee: Bueno Perales

=== Second leg ===
2 June 1968	Calvo Sotelo	1–3 (1–6 agg.)	Córdoba	Puertollano
	Posada 67'	Report	Juanín 47' (pen.); Costa 50'; Ravelo 60'	Stadium: Calvo Sotelo; Referee: Ortiz de Mendibil

16 June 1968	Real Sociedad	0–0 (1–0 agg.)	Valladolid	San Sebastián
		Report		Stadium: Atocha; Referee: Medina Iglesias

== Relegation playoffs ==
=== First leg ===
23 June 1968	Compostela	0–0	Mestalla	Santiago de Compostela
		Report		Stadium: Santa Isabel; Referee: Orrantia Capelastegui

23 June 1968	Mahón	2–1	Burgos	Mahón
	Masanet 22'; Acisclo 47' (pen.)	Report	Sampol 73' (o.g.)	Stadium: Mahonés; Referee: Muñoz García

23 June 1968	Salamanca	1–2	Ferrol	Salamanca
	Bizcocho 57'	Report	Costoya 23'; Germán 56'	Stadium: Calvario; Referee: Medina Díaz

23 June 1968	Jerez Industrial	0–0	Atlético Ceuta	Jerez de la Frontera
		Report		Stadium: Domecq; Referee: Bañón Gonzálbez

=== Second leg ===
30 June 1968	Mestalla	5–1 (5–1 agg.)	Compostela	Valencia
	Planes 12'; Huerta 39', 45'; Forment 48'; Martínez 54'	Report	Horacio 81'	Stadium: Mestalla; Referee: Ruiz Casasola

30 June 1968	Burgos	4–1 (5–3 agg.)	Mahón	Burgos
	Olalde 8'; Goyarán 26'; Iturricha 32'; Castañón 44'	Report	Ramoní 56'	Stadium: El Plantío; Referee: García Rodríguez

30 June 1968	Ferrol	2–1 (4–2 agg.)	Salamanca	Ferrol
	Gringo 5'; Costoya 89'	Report	Tapia 40'	Stadium: Manuel Rivera; Referee: Serrano Sancristóbal

30 June 1968	Atlético Ceuta	1–1 (1–1 agg.)	Jerez Industrial	Ceuta
	Burgos 32'	Report	Totó 60'	Stadium: Alfonso Murube; Referee: Rodríguez Barroso

=== Tiebreaker ===
7 July 1968	Jerez Industrial	1–0	Atlético Ceuta	Madrid
	Vega 85'	Report		Stadium: Vallecas; Referee: Ortiz Salgado
