= Del Bryan =

British former boxer (born 1967)

Personal information
- Nationality: British
- Born: Delroy Bryan; 16 April 1967 (age 59) Nottingham, England
- Height: 5 ft 8 in (1.73 m)
- Weight: Welterweight, super welterweight

Boxing career

Boxing record
- Total fights: 52
- Wins: 32
- Win by KO: 9
- Losses: 19
- Draws: 1

Delroy "Del" Bryan (born 16 April 1967) is a British former boxer who twice won the British welterweight title and fought for the European title at the same weight.

== Career ==
Born in Nottingham, Bryan's professional career began in 1986. His early results were mixed and included a defeat to George Collins and a win over Daren Dyer in 1987. In October 1987 he won his first title by beating Gary Sommervile to take the Midlands Area welterweight title. He won six of his next eight fights, which included wins over Lloyd Christie and Javier Castillejo, and a defeat to Gary Jacobs, before successfully defending his area title against Michael Justin.

In April 1990 he beat Damian Denny in a British title eliminator, setting up a challenge to Kirkland Laing's welterweight title. Bryan met Laing in January 1991 at the Royal Albert Hall, and took the fight on points to become British champion. He successfully defended the title in November against Mickey Hughes but lost it to Jacobs in his second defence three months later. Three months later he was stopped in the tenth round by Dyer.

After Jacobs vacated the title, Bryan regained it in September 1993 with a points win over Pat Barrett. He defended the title twice, beating both Derek Grainger and Lyndon Scarlett, before facing Jose Luis Navarro for the vacant EBU European welterweight title in December 1994; Navarro stopped Bryan in the tenth round to take the title.

In June 1995 Bryan made the third successful defence of his British title against Gary Logan. His fourth defence came three months later against Chris Saunders. This time Saunders took the points decision to take the title.

Bryan moved up to super welterweight and challenged Ryan Rhodes for the British title in March 1997, Rhodes stopping Bryan in the seventh round. In November 1998 he faced the unbeaten Derek Roche at the same weight for the IBO Inter-Continental title. Bryan was stopped in the tenth round and this proved to be his final fight before retiring.

During his boxing career Bryan has managed by former British welterweight champion Wally Swift.

After retiring from boxing, Bryan worked as a security officer at Nottingham Crown Court before working in construction, while at the same time training youngsters for the Probation Service. He also acted as sparring partner for Jason Booth.
