= José Luis Navarro (boxer) =

Spanish boxer

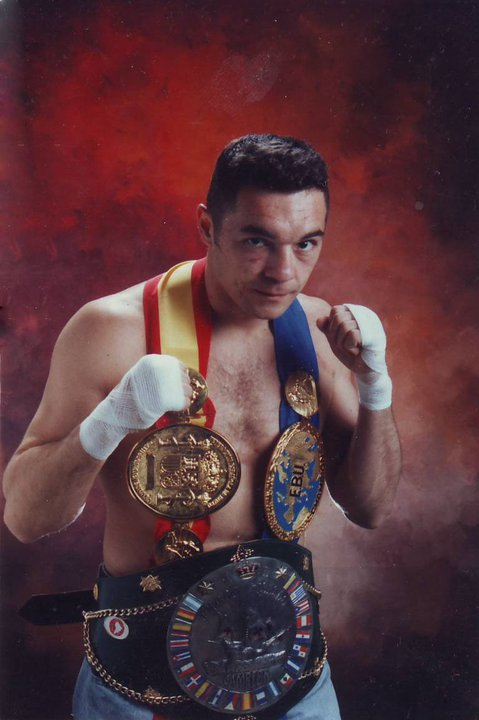

Personal information
- Nickname: El Cazador
- Nationality: Córdoba, Spain
- Born: José Luis Navarro Rivas; 24 May 1965 (age 61)
- Height: 171 cm (5 ft 7 in)
- Weight: heavyweight

Boxing career

Boxing record
- Total fights: 27
- Wins: 25
- Losses: 2
- Draws: 0

José Luis Navarro Rivas (born 24 March 1965) was a Spanish boxer who fought a total of 21 fights between 1993 and 1997. Nicknamed El Cazador, he has been the Spanish Welterweight Champion, Spanish World Welterweight and Super-Welterweight Champion, and European Welterweight Champion. None of his fights reached the final round, with all of his victories being by KO.

== Early life ==
Born in Córdoba on 24 March 1965, Navarro's first passion was football, wanting to become a player for Córdoba, just like his childhood idol José Luis Navarro, who shared his name, but a traffic accident shattered his dream of becoming a footballer; instead of hindering him, this accident only made him stronger.

== Boxing career ==
After a long career as an amateur boxer, Navarro made his professional debut on 13 January 1993 in Santander, knocking out Francisco Delgado in one round, who was undefeated in 5 fights. After knocking out a further five opponents, three Spanish and two French, he had his first real test with the veteran and tough Panamanian boxer Tony Campbell, but Navarro nevertheless subjected him to such a harsh punishment that caused him to quit at the end of the second round. He followed this up by defeating the future champion of France Patrick Charpentier, doing so in four rounds with a terrible uppercut, and was later proclaimed champion of Spain in welterweight by knocking the veteran José Molinillo in four rounds.

His natural category was welterweight, but Navarro decided to go up in weight for a shot at the Spanish Championship in super welterweight, where he faced Nicasio Moray, a two-time champion of Paraguay and the then South American middleweight champion, who had never been knocked out in his 3 losses, but Navarro did exactly that in the first round thanks to a perfect right hook, thus winning the title and improving his record to 12–0, all knockouts. He then successfully defended the title 3 times, against the Argentines José Luis Saldivia and Silvio Walter and once against the Venezuelan Alejandro Ugueto. At this point, he was already an idol throughout Europe and was beginning to be known worldwide.

On 17 December 1994, Navarro fought for the European welterweight championship in his hometown of Córdoba, facing the veteran British Delroy Bryan; despite suffering a cut on one of his cheekbones on the third round, he recovered and kept applying pressure on an increasingly overwhelmed Bryan, who in the 10th round, fell 3 times to the canvas with his face bloodied, so the referee stopped the fight and El Cazador was proclaimed Champion of Europe with a record of 18–0. He was thus chosen as Cordoban of the year in 1994. He successfully defended his European title against Zaragoza native José Ramon Escriche, doing so in 5 rounds, but he was then finally defeated by Valery Kayumba on 1 April 1995, in 8 rounds by TKO. He then collected a further six victories in the following years to reach an impressive tally of 25–1, but then lost his last fight against Andrey Pestryaev on 15 February 1997, where the European welterweight title was at stake.

During his career, Navarro had 27 fights, winning 25 of them and losing the other two. He used to get into the ring wearing the Córdoba CF shirt. Together with Toni Ortiz and Rafael Lozano, Navarro is one of the three best boxers in the history of Córdoba.

== Later life ==
After he retired from boxing, Navarro held the position of sports technician at the Provincial Council of Córdoba for 14 years. Navarro is currently an administrator at Doña Mencía.

== Honours ==
- Spanish welterweight champion
- Hispanic World Welterweight Champion
- European Welterweight Champion

== Professional fights ==
25 Victories (25 KO), 2 Defeats
Resultado	Oponente	Resultado	Duración	Fecha	Lugar	Notas
Loss	(Russia) Andrey Pestryaev	TKO	12 (12)	15 February 1997	(Spain) Thiais, Val-de-Marne, France	European Welterweight Championship
Win	(Russia) Oleg Kolchanov	TKO	4	11 October 1996	Durango, Basque Country, Spain	
Win	(Liberia) Johnson Sengbe	TKO	8 (8)	28 July 1996	Ordizia, Basque Country, Spain	
Win	(Costa Rica) David Salguera	TKO	3	24 May 1996	Córdoba, Andalusia, Spain	
Win	(Bulgaria) Borislav Bojkov	KO	2	29 March 1996	Ciudad Real, Castilla-La Mancha, Spain	
Win	(Hungary) Aladar Horvath	TKO	3	22 February 1996	Madrid, Spain	
Win	(Liberia) Johnson Sengbe	TKO	6 (6)	8 February 1996	Madrid, Spain	
Loss	(France) Valery Kayumba	TKO	8 (12)	1 April 1995	(Spain) Levallois-Perret, Hauts-de-Seine, France	European Welterweight Championship
Win	(Spain) José Ramon Escriche	TKO	5 (12)	17 February 1995	Córdoba, Andalusia, Spain	European Welterweight Championship
Win	(United Kingdom) Delroy Bryan	TKO	10 (12)	17 December 1994	Córdoba, Andalusia, Spain	European Welterweight Championship
Win	(Venezuela) Alejandro Ugueto	TKO	10 (12)	4 November 1994	Córdoba, Andalusia, Spain	Hispanic World Light Middleweight Championship
Win	(Portugal) Issa Djau	KO	1	20 August 1994	Almeria, Andalusia, Spain	
Win	(Costa Rica) Victor Báez	TKO	3	20 May 1994	Leganés, Spain	
Win	(Argentina) Silvio Walter Rojas	TKO	9 (12)	29 April 1994	Utrera, Andalusia, Spain	Hispanic World Light Middleweight Championship
Win	(Argentina) José Luis Saldivia	TKO	5 (12)	25 March 1994	Córdoba, Andalusia, Spain	Hispanic World Light Middleweight Championship
Win	(Paraguay) Nicasio Moray	KO	1 (12)	19 February 1994	Leganés, Comunidad de Madrid, Spain	Hispanic World Light Middleweight Championship
Win	(Panama) Tony Campbell	TKO	4	4 February 1994	Leganés, Spain	
Win	(Spain) José Molinillo	TKO	4 (12)	19 November 1993	Huesca, Aragón, Spain	Spanish Welterweight Championship
Win	(France) Patrick Charpentier	TKO	4	16 October 1993	Ciudad Real, Castilla-La Mancha, Spain	
Win	(Spain) José Luis Vasquez	TKO	3	2 October 1993	Leganés, Spain	
Win	(Panama) Tony Campbell	TKO	3	18 September 1993	Santander, Cantabria, Spain	
Win	(Spain) Julio Días Moreno	TKO	1	14 August 1993	Santander, Cantabria, Spain	
Win	(Spain) Isidro Hernández	TKO	2	18 June 1993	Córdoba, Andalusia, Spain	
Win	(France) Jean-Marc Phenieux	TKO	2	28 April 1993	Miranda de Ebro, Castile and León, Spain	
Win	(France) Denis Dario	TKO	2 (6)	19 February 1993	Miranda de Ebro, Castile and León, Spain	
Win	(Spain) Ahmed Situbungu	TKO	2	29 January 1993	Leganés, Spain	
Win	(Spain) Francisco Delgado	KO	1	15 January 1993	Santander, Cantabria, Spain	
