= Bert Schenk =

German boxer

Personal information
- Nationality: (Germany) German
- Born: Bert Schenk; November 14, 1970 (age 55) East Berlin, East Germany
- Height: 5 ft 9 1/2 in (177 cm)
- Weight: Middleweight

Boxing career
- Reach: 74 in (188 cm)
- Stance: Southpaw

Boxing record
- Total fights: 38
- Wins: 36
- Win by KO: 23
- Losses: 2
- Draws: 0
- No contests: 0
Medal record
Representing Germany
Men's Boxing
European Amateur Championships
Bronze medal – third place	1993 Bursa	Light Middleweight

Bert Schenk (born 14 November 1970 in East Berlin, East Germany) was a German boxer.

== Professional career ==
Schenk turned pro in 1996 and won the WBO Middleweight Title on 30 January 1999 against Freeman Barr by 4th-round TKO. Otis Grant had vacated the belt to fight Roy Jones Jr. for the WBC/WBA light heavyweight titles, leaving the belt vacant for Schenk and Barr to fight. Schenk was stripped of the belt for not defending, and later lost the following year to Armand Krajnc when he recovered.

== See also ==
- List of middleweight boxing champions

Achievements
Vacant Title last held by Otis Grant	WBO middleweight champion January 30, 1999 - July 14, 1999; Stripped	Succeeded by Jason Matthews; Interim champion promoted
