= Jason Matthews (boxer) =

English boxer

Personal information
- Nickname: Method Man
- Nationality: British
- Born: 20 July 1970 (age 55) Hackney, London, England
- Height: 5 ft 10 1/2 in (179 cm)
- Weight: Middleweight

Boxing career
- Reach: 74 in (188 cm)
- Stance: Orthodox

Boxing record
- Total fights: 23
- Wins: 21
- Win by KO: 18
- Losses: 2

Jason Fitzroy Matthews (born 20 July 1970 in Hackney) is a former boxer from England in the Middleweight (160 lb) division.

== Boxing career ==
=== Amateur career ===
Matthews won the 1995 Amateur Boxing Association British middleweight title, when boxing out of the Crown and Manor ABC.

=== Professional career ===
Also known as "Method Man", Matthews turned pro in 1995 and won the vacant World Boxing Organization inter-continental middleweight title with a victory against Paul Wright in 1997; then won the commonwealth Middleweight Title against Paul Jones in 1998. He then won the middleweight interim title on 17 June 1999 with a victory against Ryan Rhodes. He was elevated to full champion when long-term injuries prevented the previous title holder, Bert Schenk, from defending the title. Matthews lost the title to Armand Krajnc by TKO in 1999 in his first defence. Matthews announced his retirement from boxing after the bout due to an eye injury, which occurred during the fight.

== Professional boxing record ==
23 fights	21 wins	2 losses
By knockout	18	2
By decision	2	0
By disqualification	1	0

No.	Result	Record	Opponent	Type	Round, time	Date	Location	Notes
23	Loss	21–2	Armand Krajnc	TKO	8 (12)	1999-11-27	Hansehalle, Lübeck, Schleswig-Holstein, Germany	Lost WBO middleweight title
22	Win	21–1	Ryan Rhodes	KO	2 (12)	1999-07-17	Dome Leisure Centre, Doncaster, England, U.K.	Won interim WBO middleweight title
21	Win	20–1	Paul Jones	DQ	7 (12)	1999-02-27	Sports Centre, Oldham, England, U.K.	Won Commonwealth middleweight title
20	Win	19–1	Mark Lee Dawson	TKO	1 (8)	1999-01-23	Grundy Park Leisure Centre, Cheshunt, England, U.K.	
19	Win	18–1	Pedro Carragher	TKO	4 (8)	1998-10-24	Whitchurch Sports Centre, Bristol, England, U.K.	
18	Win	17–1	Peter Waudby	KO	2 (6)	1998-07-14	Rivermead Leisure Centre, Reading, England, U.K.	
17	Loss	16–1	Lóránt Szabó	TKO	6 (12)	1998-02-07	Grundy Park Leisure Centre, Cheshunt, England, U.K.	Lost WBO Inter-Continental middleweight title
16	Win	16–0	Darren Dorrington	TKO	7 (12)	1997-10-11	Sheffield Arena, Sheffield, England, U.K.	Retained WBO Inter-Continental middleweight title
15	Win	15–0	Patrick Swann	RTD	5 (12)	1997-05-29	Hilton Hotel, Mayfair, England, U.K.	Won WBO Inter-Continental middleweight title
14	Win	14–0	Paul Wright	TKO	3 (12)	1997-03-27	Sports Village, Norwich, England, U.K.	
13	Win	13–0	Ernie Loveridge	TKO	5 (6)	1997-02-08	London Arena, London, England, U.K.	
12	Win	12–0	Danny Ryan	KO	5 (8)	1996-10-19	Whitchurch Sports Centre, Bristol, England, U.K.	
11	Win	11–0	Martin Jolley	TKO	3 (8)	1996-06-25	Mansfield Leisure Centre, Mansfield, England, U.K.	
10	Win	10–0	Peter Vosper	TKO	1 (6)	1996-05-11	York Hall, London, England, U.K.	
9	Win	9–0	John McAlpine	TKO	1 (6)	1996-03-16	Scottish Exhibition Centre, Glasgow, Scotland, U.K.	
8	Win	8–0	Sven Hamer	TKO	6 (6)	1995-12-09	York Hall, London, England, U.K.	
7	Win	7–0	Russell Washer	TKO	5 (6)	1995-10-27	Metropole Hotel, Brighton, England, U.K.	
6	Win	6–0	Salah Eddine Kobba	TKO	1 (6)	1995-10-09	San Benedetto del Tronto, Marche, Italy	
5	Win	5–0	Marvin O'Brien	PTS	6 (6)	1995-09-30	Cardiff Arms Park, Cardiff, Wales, U.K.	
4	Win	4–0	Mark Lee Dawson	TKO	3 (4)	1995-09-15	Mansfield Leisure Centre, Mansfield, England, U.K.	
3	Win	3–0	John Duckworth	PTS	4 (4)	1995-09-02	Wembley Stadium, London, England, U.K.	
2	Win	2–0	Stuart Dunn	KO	1 (6)	1995-07-22	London Arena, London, England, U.K.	
1	Win	1–0	Chris Richards	KO	4 (6)	1995-07-01	Royal Albert Hall, London, England, U.K.	

== See also ==
- List of world middleweight boxing champions
- List of British world boxing champions

Sporting positions
Amateur boxing titles
Previous: David Starie	ABA middleweight champion 1995	Next: John Pearce
Regional boxing titles
Preceded by Paul Jones	Commonwealth middleweight champion 27 February 1999 – 1999; Vacated	Vacant Title next held by Alain Bonnamie
World boxing titles
New title	WBO middleweight champion Interim title 17 July 1999 – November 1999; Promoted	Vacant Title next held by Harry Simon
Preceded by Bert Schenk; Stripped	WBO middleweight champion November 1999 – 27 November 1999	Succeeded by Armand Krajnc
