= Rodney Jones (boxer) =

American boxer

Personal information
- Nickname: Smooth
- Nationality: American
- Born: Rodney Jones; July 28, 1968 (age 58) Lafayette, Louisiana, U.S.
- Height: 6 ft 1 in (185 cm)
- Weight: Middleweight; Light middleweight Welterweight

Boxing career
- Reach: 77 in (196 cm)
- Stance: Orthodox

Boxing record
- Total fights: 42
- Wins: 37
- Win by KO: 22
- Losses: 4
- Draws: 1
- No contests: 0

Rodney Jones (born July 28, 1968) is an American professional boxer who competed from 1991 to 2007. He challenged twice for a light-middleweight world title in 2000 and 2007. At the regional level, he held the NABO and NABF light-middleweight titles.

== Amateur career ==
Jones compiled an amateur record of 31-4.

== Professional career ==
Early in his career when Rodney was 28 years old, he beat an eighteen-year-old Antonio Margarito by a ten-round decision. The young fighter went on to become a three-time World Champion.

=== WBO Light Middleweight Championship ===
In his first effort at a World Championship he would lose to Harry Simon on September 23, 2000.

==== IBF Light Middleweight Championship ====
On February 3, 2007 Jones lost to world champion Cory Spinks in Silver Spurs Arena, Kissimmee, Florida.

Vacant Title last held by Rene Arredondo	WBO NABO Light Middleweight Champion; November 18, 1995 – June 16, 1998; Vacated	Vacant Title next held by Doug Gray
Vacant Title last held by Doug Gray	WBO NABO Light Middleweight Champion; June 22, 1998 – March 8, 1999; Vacated	Vacant Title next held by Tito Mendoza
Vacant Title last held by Juan Carlos Candelo	NABF Light Middleweight Champion; April 15, 2004 – June 10, 2006; Vacated	Vacant Title next held by Andrey Tsurkan
