= Michael Jones (boxer) =

English boxer

Personal information
- Nickname: The Destiny
- Nationality: British
- Born: 14 November 1974 (age 51) Liverpool, England
- Height: 6 ft 0 in (1.83 m)
- Weight: Light middleweight

Boxing career
- Stance: Orthodox

Boxing record
- Total fights: 27
- Wins: 24
- Win by KO: 10
- Losses: 3

Michael Jones (born 14 November 1974) is a British former professional boxer who competed from 1997 to 2007. He held the Commonwealth super welterweight title from 2002 to 2003; the British super welterweight title from 2004 to 2005; and challenged once for the EBU European super welterweight title in 2007.

== Professional boxing record ==
27 fights	24 wins	3 losses
By knockout	10	2
By decision	14	1
Draws	0	

No.	Result	Record	Opponent	Type	Round, time	Date	Location	Notes
27	Loss	24–3	(Italy) Michele Piccirillo	TKO	12 (12)	25 Jan 2007	PalaLido, Milan, Italy	For EBU European super welterweight title
26	Win	24–2	(Hungary) Szabolcs Rimovszky	TKO	1 (6), 0:58	10 Nov 2006	(United Kingdom) Borough Hall, Hartlepool, England	
25	Win	23–2	(Russia) Sergey Starkov	PTS	6	23 Jun 2006	(United Kingdom) Winter Gardens, Blackpool, England	
24	Win	22–2	(France) Ismael Kerzazi	TKO	6 (6), 0:53	3 Mar 2006	(United Kingdom) Borough Hall, Hartlepool, England	
23	Loss	21–2	(United Kingdom) Jamie Moore	TKO	6 (12), 1:04	8 Jul 2005	(United Kingdom) Leisure Centre, Altrincham, England	Lost British super welterweight title
22	Win	21–1	(United Kingdom) Jamie Moore	DQ	3 (12), 1:16	26 Nov 2004	(United Kingdom) Leisure Centre, Altrincham, England	Won British super welterweight title; Moore disqualified for punches after break
21	Win	20–1	(United Kingdom) Darren Rhodes	TKO	3 (12), 2:37	10 Apr 2004	(United Kingdom) M.E.N. Arena, Manchester, England	
20	Win	19–1	(United Kingdom) Jason Williams	PTS	6	13 Mar 2004	(United Kingdom) Huddersfield Sports Centre, Huddersfield, England	
19	Win	18–1	(United Kingdom) Ojay Abrahams	PTS	6	18 Oct 2003	(United Kingdom) M.E.N. Arena, Manchester, England	
18	Loss	17–1	(United Kingdom) Jamie Moore	PTS	12	19 Apr 2003	(United Kingdom) Everton Park Sports Centre, Liverpool, England	Lost Commonwealth super welterweight title; For British super welterweight title
17	Win	17–0	(United Kingdom) Howard Clarke	PTS	6	8 Feb 2003	(United Kingdom) Everton Park Sports Centre, Liverpool, England	
16	Win	16–0	(Kenya) Joshua Onyango	TKO	6 (12), 0:20	28 May 2002	(United Kingdom) Everton Park Sports Centre, Liverpool, England	Won Commonwealth super welterweight title
15	Win	15–0	(United Kingdom) Mark Richards	KO	1 (6), 0:52	13 Apr 2002	(United Kingdom) Everton Park Sports Centre, Liverpool, England	
14	Win	14–0	(Poland) Piotr Bartnicki	TKO	4 (6), 0:35	10 Dec 2001	(United Kingdom) Everton Park Sports Centre, Liverpool, England	
13	Win	13–0	(United Kingdom) Delroy Mellis	PTS	8	6 Oct 2001	(United Kingdom) Wythenshawe Forum, Manchester, England	
12	Win	12–0	(France) Judicael Bedel	PTS	6	24 Apr 2001	(United Kingdom) Olympia, Liverpool, England	
11	Win	11–0	(United Kingdom) Howard Clarke	PTS	4	3 Feb 2001	(United Kingdom) Bowlers Exhibition Centre, Manchester, England	
10	Win	10–0	(Algeria) Mohamed Boualleg	PTS	8	2 Jun 2000	(United Kingdom) Stour Centre, Ashford, England	
9	Win	9–0	(United Kingdom) Alan Gilbert	RTD	3 (6), 3:00	11 Mar 2000	(United Kingdom) Olympia, London, England	
8	Win	8–0	(United Kingdom) Paul King	PTS	6	26 Jun 1999	(United Kingdom) Kelvin Hall, Glasgow, Scotland	
7	Win	7–0	(United Kingdom) Ojay Abrahams	PTS	6	19 Dec 1998	(United Kingdom) Everton Park Sports Centre, Liverpool, England	
6	Win	6–0	(Iran) Mehrdud Takaloo	PTS	6	10 Oct 1998	(United Kingdom) York Hall, London, England	
5	Win	5–0	(United Kingdom) Gary Booth	TKO	2 (4), 2:05	6 Jun 1998	(United Kingdom) Everton Park Sports Centre, Liverpool, England	
4	Win	4–0	(Republic of the Congo) Koba Kulu	TKO	3 (4), 2:43	25 Apr 1998	(United Kingdom) National Ice Rink, Cardiff, Wales	
3	Win	3–0	(United Kingdom) Darren McInulty	PTS	4	7 Mar 1998	(United Kingdom) Rivermead Leisure Centre, Reading, England	
2	Win	2–0	(United Kingdom) Martin Cavey	KO	1 (4), 0:40	17 Jan 1998	(United Kingdom) Whitchurch Sports Centre, Bristol, England	
1	Win	1–0	(United Kingdom) Harry Butler	PTS	4	15 Nov 1997	(United Kingdom) Whitchurch Sports Centre, Bristol, England	
