= Otis Grant =

Canadian boxer

Personal information
- Nickname: Magic
- Nationality: Canadian
- Born: Otis Grant; December 23, 1967 (age 58) Saint Ann Parish, Jamaica
- Height: 5 ft 9 1/2 in (177 cm)
- Weight: Middleweight; Super middleweight; Light heavyweight

Boxing career
- Reach: 71 in (180 cm)
- Stance: Southpaw

Boxing record
- Total fights: 42
- Wins: 38
- Win by KO: 17
- Losses: 3
- Draws: 1
- No contests: 0
Medal record
Men's Boxing
Representing Canada
Pan American Games
Silver medal – second place	1987 Indianapolis	Middleweight

Otis Grant (born December 23, 1967) is a Canadian retired boxer. As an amateur he won a silver medal for Canada at the 1987 Pan American Games, losing to Cuba's Angel Espinosa in the final. He is a two-time North American Boxing Federation (NABF) middleweight title holder, as well as recognized for being the first black Quebecer to win a WBO championship.

== Early life ==
Born in Saint Ann, Jamaica, Otis and his family moved to Montreal in 1977, when he was 9 years old. A multi sport athlete, he began boxing at age 11 alongside his older brother Howard, and earned the nickname "Magic" from family members who related his basketball ability to hall of famer Magic Johnson. At 17 years old, Grant had won the Canadian Senior Amateur Boxing Championships (CSABC) in his weight division of 71 kilos (156.5 pounds). This would propel him to compete at the World Youth Championship for the Canadian national team, despite his junior status. Later on, Otis competed at the 1987 Pan American Games, earning a silver medal by being defeated in the finals against Cuba's Angel Espinosa, before turning pro.

== Professional career ==
Known as "Magic", Grant turned pro in 1988 and captured the vacant WBO middleweight title in 1997 with a decision over Ryan Rhodes in England. He vacated the belt following a defense against Ernesto Rafael Sena in 1998.

=== Fight vs Roy Jones Jr. ===
After a successful career thus far as the middleweight title holder, Grant vacated his belt to challenge prevailing champ Roy Jones Jr. in 1998 for the WBC and WBA light heavyweight titles, moving up two weight classes to make his debut in the light heavyweight division. The fighters decided on a catch-weight match, with Grant and Jones Jr. coming into the ring at 172 lbs (78 kg)and 171 lbs (77.56 kg), respectively. Grant had been a large underdog coming into the fight. Jones Jr. had the upper hand throughout the match up, earning knock downs in the 6th and 10th rounds. After his second knock down in the 10th round, Grant's trainer Russ Anber threw in the towel, giving Jones Jr. the TKO victory.

=== Comeback ===
Following Grant's near-fatal car crash in 1999, doctors stated that although his superb condition saved his life, he would be unable to continue boxing. Nevertheless, Grant was determined to make a return to the ring in search of another title shot as a super middleweight. After a 4-year hiatus, he had his first fight back against Dingaan Thobela(40-10-2), defeating him convincingly in 8 rounds. Grant continued his winning streak for another straight 6 fights, until he faced off against Librado Andrade (23-0) in 2006 for the WBC Super Middleweight number 1 contender position. After being beat throughout the fight, Grant's team elected to sit out at the 8th round, giving Andrade the victory and the title shot. Grant chose this opportunity to retire, stating that it was now his time to "bow out, and bow out gracefully".

== Personal life ==
=== Education ===
Grant took up post-secondary studies at Vanier College, eventually becoming one of their most well-known alumni. Following his cegep graduation, he enrolled in Concordia University and earned a BA in recreation and leisure studies, becoming a member of their class of '93.

=== Accident ===
In June 1999, Grant was involved in a dangerous collision during a road trip back to Montreal. Grant, who was the driver of the car, noticed an oncoming vehicle travelling north on a southbound lane and swerved towards the right to avoid contact for the passengers, but took the car's full impact on the driver's side. Passengers included former pro boxer Hercules Kyvelos and his then 6-year-old daughter. All were rushed to the emergency room in separate ambulances, although the passengers were virtually unscathed. Once recognizing that his daughter was safe at the hospital, Grant slipped into a coma for seven days. Other injuries sustained during the crash included five broken ribs, a punctured lung, and a shattered shoulder blade, all on his left hand side. This accident came only six months after vacating his WBO (World Boxing Organization) title belt. Once reviewed by doctors, Grant was essentially told he would never be able to return to the ring. Despite this, he made his official comeback in 2003, earning a unanimous decision victory over former world champion Dingaan Thobela.

=== Community work ===
After being approached by an organization to loan his name for charity, Grant became convinced to use his name to aid the needy. Thus, the Otis Grant & Friends foundation was created. The Otis Grant & Friends is a non profit charity, established in 1999, initially formed to aid hunger, poverty and sicknesses within the community. The organization has grown generously, now donating food, clothes and medicine to communities all across Canada. In addition to this, the organization sends children to summer camps whose families can't afford it, gives aid to students in special education at the high school level, as well as providing scholarships to graduating high school students who plan on post-secondary studies.

Grant also spends time working as a teacher's assistant and counsellor for students in special education at Lindsay Place, a local high school in Montreal, helping them adjust to school life. He is currently the coordinator at the community learning centre at Riverdale high school.

For all of his actions and benevolence towards the community, Otis Grant had been named the 2007 Concordia Alumnus of the year.

=== Future outside the ring ===
Otis Grant, along with his brother Howard Grant, own a boxing gym in Dollard-Des-Ormeaux, Montreal, named Grant Brothers Boxing where he coaches and manages amateur boxing events and also professional events in association with Rixa Promotions and Groupe Yvon Michel. he is also involved in two boxing brands: Grant Boxing and GBB. He is married to Betty Mullins and has two children Alexandria and Andrew. He lives with his family in Montreal, Quebec, Canada.

The professional boxing gloves he helped develop ranked as the best gloves in term of protection with an average of 0.0005% ratio of injuries while according to the John Hopkin's Medical School is 3.6%.

== Professional boxing record ==
42 fights	38 wins	3 losses
By knockout	17	3
By decision	21	0
Draws	1	

Result	Record	Opponent	Type	Round, time	Date	Location	Notes
Loss	38-3-1	(Mexico) Librado Andrade	RTD	7 (12)	08/04/2006	(Canada) Montreal Casino, Montreal, Quebec	
Win	38-2-1	(United States) Donnell Wiggins	UD	10	29/10/2005	(Canada) Lac Leamy Casino, Gatineau, Quebec	
Win	37-2-1	(Ghana) Charles Adamu	UD	12	18/06/2005	(Canada) Bell Centre, Montreal, Quebec	Retained WBC International super middleweight title
Win	36-2-1	(Australia) Nader Hamdan	UD	12	12/03/2005	(Canada) Montreal Casino, Montreal, Quebec	Retained WBC International super middleweight title
Win	35-2-1	(Costa Rica) Henry Porras	UD	12	11/12/2004	(Canada) Montreal Casino, Montreal, Quebec	Won WBC International super middleweight title
Win	34-2-1	(Canada) Mark Woolnough	UD	10	11/09/2004	(Canada) Montreal Casino, Montreal, Quebec	Won Canada super middleweight title
Win	33-2-1	(United States) Prince Badi Ajamu	MD	10	24/04/2004	(Canada) Colisée Pepsi, Quebec City, Quebec	
Win	32-2-1	(South Africa) Dingaan Thobela	UD	8	22/11/2003	(Canada) Bell Centre, Montreal, Quebec	
Loss	31-2-1	(United States) Roy Jones Jr.	TKO	10 (12)	14/11/1998	(United States) Foxwoods Resort, Mashantucket, Connecticut	For WBC and WBA light heavyweight titles
Win	31-1-1	(Argentina) Ernesto Rafael Sena	TD	9	12/05/1998	(Canada) Corel Centre, Ottawa, Ontario	Retained WBO middleweight title
Win	30-1-1	(United Kingdom) Ryan Rhodes	UD	12	13/12/1997	(United Kingdom) Ponds Forge, Sheffield, England	Won vacant WBO middleweight title
Win	29-1-1	(Puerto Rico) Danny Garcia	TKO	7 (12)	27/07/1997	(United States) Belle Casino, Baton Rouge, Louisiana	Retained NABF middleweight title
Draw	28-1-1	(United States) Lonnie Bradley	PTS	12	04/03/1997	(United States) The Aladdin, Paradise, Nevada	For WBO middleweight title
Win	28-1	(United States) Rodney Toney	MD	12	18/06/1996	(United States) Convention Center, Edison, New Jersey	Retained NABF middleweight title
Win	27-1	(United States) James Green	TKO	12	15/01/1996	(United States) Landmark Inn, Woodbridge, New Jersey	Retained NABF middleweight title
Win	26-1	(United States) Derrick James	DQ	11 (12)	10/10/1995	(United States) Blue Cross Arena, Rochester, New York	Won NABF middleweight title
Win	25-1	(United States) Undra White	UD	10	24/02/1995	(Canada) Palais des Sports, Jonquière, Quebec	
Win	24-1	(United States) William Bo James	PTS	10	15/12/1994	(United States) Foxwoods Resort, Mashantucket, Connecticut	
Win	23-1	(United States) Jerry Lee Williams	UD	10	15/11/1994	(Canada) Montreal Forum, Montreal, Quebec	
Loss	22-1	(United States) Quincy Taylor	KO	12 (12)	15/03/1994	(United States) The Roxy, Boston, Massachusetts	Lost NABF middleweight title
Win	22-0	(United States) Willie Monroe	UD	12	05/10/1993	(United States) The Riviera, Winchester, Nevada	Retained NABF middleweight title
Win	21-0	(United States) Brett Lally	TKO	4 (12)	03/08/1993	(United States) The Riviera, Winchester, Nevada	Retained NABF middleweight title
Win	20-0	(United States) Tyrone Moore	KO	2 (10)	18/06/1993	(Canada) Hotel Le Roussillon, Jonquière, Quebec	
Win	19-0	(United States) Ron Collins	UD	12	08/12/1992	(Canada) Montreal Forum, Montreal, Quebec	Retained NABF middleweight title
Win	18-0	(United States) Gilbert Baptist	UD	12	28/09/1992	(Canada) Verdun, Quebec	Won vacant NABF middleweight title
Win	17-0	(Canada) Todd Nadon	TKO	3 (12)	17/03/1992	(Canada) Montreal Forum, Montreal, Quebec	Retained Canada middleweight title
Win	16-0	(United States) Darryl Anthony	UD	10	10/12/1991	(Canada) Montreal, Quebec	
Win	15-0	(Canada) Dan Sherry	RTD	7 (12)	27/09/1991	(Canada) Memorial Arena, Niagara Falls, Ontario	Won Canada middleweight title
Win	14-0	(United States) Eddie Tyler	TKO	2 (8)	31/05/1991	(Canada) St. Joseph Arena, Shediac, New Brunswick	
Win	13-0	(Canada) Jaime Ollenberger	TKO	3 (12)	18/03/1991	(Canada) Halifax Forum, Halifax, Nova Scotia	Won WBC Intercontinental super middleweight title
Win	12-0	(Canada) Darrell Flint	KO	1 (8)	25/10/1990	(Canada) Montreal Forum, Montreal, Quebec	
Win	11-0	(United States) Knox Brown	TKO	6 (10)	02/10/1990	(Canada) The Palace, Laval, Quebec	
Win	10-0	(United States) Danny Mitchell	UD	8	01/08/1990	(Canada) Copps Coliseum, Hamilton, Ontario	
Win	9-0	(United States) Dwayne North	KO	1	11/04/1990	(United States) Albany, New York	
Win	8-0	(United States) Art McCloud	TKO	1	03/10/1989	(United States) The Blue Horizon, Philadelphia, Pennsylvania	
Win	7-0	(United States) John Wilkinson	TKO	3 (6)	27/06/1989	(Canada) Paul Sauvé Arena, Montreal, Quebec	
Win	6-0	(United States) Fred Johnson	KO	1	16/06/1989	(United States) Hartford, Connecticut	
Win	5-0	(United States) Don Carroll	PTS	4	23/05/1989	(United States) Showboat Hotel and Casino, Atlantic City, New Jersey	
Win	4-0	(Canada) Stokely Crichlow	TKO	1 (6)	05/05/1989	(United States) Hartford Civic Center, Hartford, Connecticut	
Win	3-0	(Canada) Alan Cormier	TKO	3 (4)	28/04/1989	(United States) Roseland Ballroom, Taunton, Massachusetts	
Win	2-0	(Canada) Bernard Rompre	TKO	1 (4)	20/03/1989	(Canada) Paul Sauvé Arena, Montreal, Quebec	
Win	1-0	(United States) John Gross	UD	4	29/11/1988	(Canada) Montreal Forum, Montreal, Quebec	

== See also ==
- List of middleweight boxing champions

Achievements
Vacant Title last held by Lonnie Bradley	WBO middleweight champion December 13, 1997 - November 14, 1998; Vacated	Vacant Title next held by Bert Schenk
