= Lonnie Bradley =

American boxer

Personal information
- Nationality: American
- Born: Lonnie Sterling Bradley; September 16, 1968 (age 57) Charleston, South Carolina, U.S.
- Height: 5 ft 11 in (180 cm)
- Weight: Middleweight

Boxing career
- Reach: 76 in (193 cm)
- Stance: Orthodox

Boxing record
- Total fights: 31
- Wins: 29
- Win by KO: 21
- Losses: 1
- Draws: 1

Lonnie Sterling Bradley (born September 16, 1968) is an American former boxer.

== Amateur career ==
Born in Charleston, SC Bradley was an amateur standout and compiled a stellar career, capturing two New York Golden Gloves Championships. In 1992 he was also a National Golden Gloves Champion.

== Professional career ==
Bradley turned pro in 1992 and won the Vacant WBO Middleweight Title in 1995 with a TKO of David Mendez. Bradley defended the title six times before relinquishing the belt, including victories over Simon Brown and John Williams. Bradley retired in 2003 after suffering his lone defeat, a TKO loss to David Alonso Lopez.

== Professional boxing record ==
31 fights	29 wins	1 loss
By knockout	21	1
By decision	8	0
Draws	1	

No.	Result	Record	Opponent	Type	Round, time	Date	Location	Notes
31	Loss	30-0-1	(Mexico) David Alonso López	TKO	7 (10)	2003-11-07	(United States) Desert Diamond Casino, Tucson	
30	Win	29-0-1	(United States) Kwan Manasseh	UD	8 (8)	2002-08-23	(United States) 4 Bears Casino & Lodge, New Town	
29	Win	28-0-1	(United States) Eric Holland	UD	8 (8)	1999-09-24	(United States) MCI Center, Washington	
28	Win	27-0-1	(United States) Robert Muhammad	TKO	6 (8)	1999-08-27	(United States) Jai Alai Fronton, Miami	
27	Win	26-0-1	(United States) John Williams	TKO	8 (12)	1997-06-28	(United States) MGM Grand Garden Arena, Las Vegas	Retained WBO Middleweight title
26	Draw	25-0-1	(Jamaica) Otis Grant	SD	12 (12)	1997-03-04	(United States) Aladdin Hotel & Casino, Las Vegas	Retained WBO Middleweight title
25	Win	25-0	(Jamaica) Simon Brown	UD	12 (12)	1996-08-30	(United States) Municipal Stadium, Reading	Retained WBO Middleweight title
24	Win	24-0	(United States) Lonny Beasley	UD	12 (12)	1996-05-07	(United States) St. John's Arena, Steubenville	Retained WBO Middleweight title
23	Win	23-0	(United States) Randy Smith	TKO	2 (12)	1996-02-06	(United States) 69th Regiment Armory, New York	Retained WBO Middleweight title
22	Win	22-0	(Argentina) Dario Victor Galindez	TKO	1 (12)	1995-07-15	(United States) Great Western Forum, Inglewood	Retained WBO Middleweight title
21	Win	21-0	(Mexico) David Mendez	TKO	12 (12)	1995-05-19	(United States) Buffalo Bill's Star Arena, Primm	Won vacant WBO Middleweight title
20	Win	20-0	(Dominican Republic) Apolinar Hernandez	UD	10 (10)	1995-03-03	(United States) Hauppauge	Retained New York State Middleweight title
19	Win	19–0	(Mexico) Luis Vazquez	TKO	5 (10)	1995-01-30	(United States) Great Western Forum, Inglewood	
18	Win	18–0	(United States) Karl Willis	TKO	3 (10)	1995-01-03	(United States) Aladdin Hotel & Casino, Las Vegas	
17	Win	17–0	(United States) Matthew Charleston	KO	2 (10)	1994-11-07	(United States) Great Western Forum, Inglewood	
16	Win	16–0	(United States) Ron Morgan	MD	10 (10)	1994-08-07	(United States) Villa Roma Resort, Callicoon	Won vacant New York State Middleweight title
15	Win	15–0	(United States) Darrell Brooks	TKO	5 (8)	1994-06-12	(United States) Trump Plaza Hotel, Atlantic City	
14	Win	14–0	(United States) Anthony Bryant	UD	8 (8)	1994-02-12	(United States) Cervantes Center, Saint Louis	
13	Win	13–0	(United States) Dana Roston	TKO	2 (8)	1994-01-15	(United States) Bristol	
12	Win	12–0	(United States) Tim Cooper	TKO	8 (8)	1993-12-03	(United States) Bristol	
11	Win	11-0	(United States) Eric Rhinehart	TKO	2 (8)	1993-11-02	(United States) Merv Griffin's Resorts, Atlantic City	
10	Win	10–0	(United States) Gary Smith	TKO	5 (8)	1993-09-25	(United States) Erie	
9	Win	9–0	(United States) Artee Bright	TKO	2 (6)	1993-08-10	(United States) Memorial Auditorium, Greenville	
8	Win	8–0	(United States) Marcel Huffaker	KO	1 (6)	1993-07-08	(United States) Paramount Theatre, New York	
7	Win	7–0	(United States) Tony McCrimmion	RTD	1 (6)	1993-06-24	(United States) Paramount Theatre, New York	
6	Win	6–0	(United States) Craig Mills	TKO	4 (6)	1993-04-22	(United States) Paramount Theatre, New York	
5	Win	5–0	(United States) Ken Wallace	MD	4 (4)	1993-03-06	(United States) Madison Square Garden, New York	
4	Win	4–0	(United States) Dexter Emanuel	KO	1 (4)	1993-02-18	(United States) Paramount Theatre, New York	
3	Win	3–0	(United States) David Woods	TKO	2 (4)	1993-01-27	(United States) Paramount Theatre, New York	
2	Win	2–0	(United States) John Taylor	KO	1 (4)	1992-12-11	(United States) Paramount Theatre, New York	
1	Win	1–0	(United States) James Mullins	TKO	1 (4)	1992-11-19	(United States) Dome, Virginia Beach	

== See also ==
- List of world middleweight boxing champions

Sporting positions
Amateur boxing titles
Previous: Kevin Bonner	Golden Gloves light middleweight champion 1992	Next: Darnell Wilson
Regional boxing titles
Vacant Title last held by Julio César Green	New York State Middleweight title August 7, 1994 – 1995; Vacated	Vacant Title next held by Paweł Wolak
World boxing titles
Vacant Title last held by Steve Collins	WBO middleweight champion May 19, 1995 – 1997; Vacated	Vacant Title next held by Otis Grant
