= Sartory-Saal =

Coordinates: 50°56′29″N 6°56′35″E

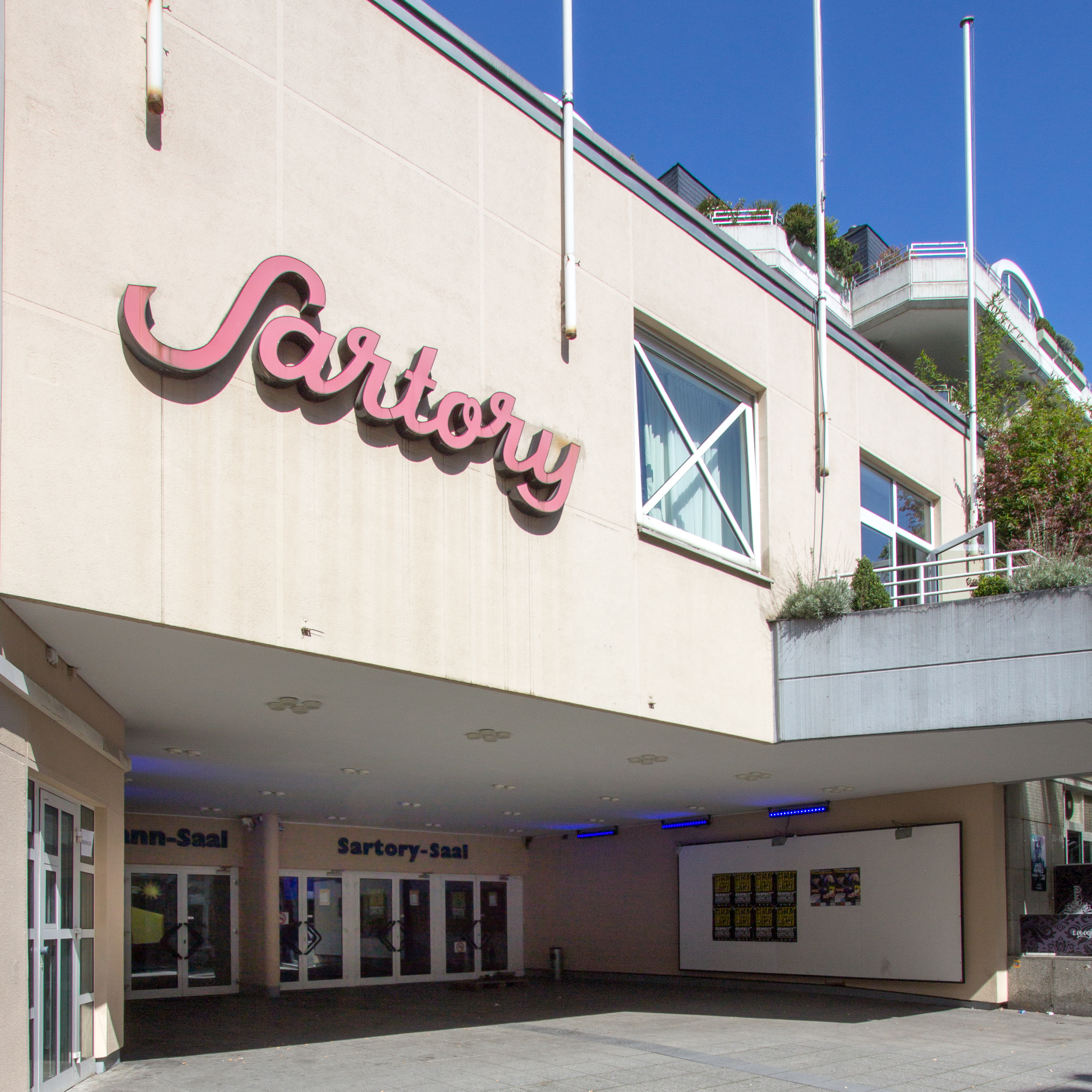
Sartory-Saal

Sartory-Säle or Sartory-Saal is a concert hall site located in Innenstadt, Cologne, Germany. It has a capacity of 1400 people. Notable past performers include BAP, Weather Report, Aerosmith, Def Leppard, Whitesnake, Queen, AC/DC and Judas Priest.
