= Wayne Alexander (boxer) =

English boxer

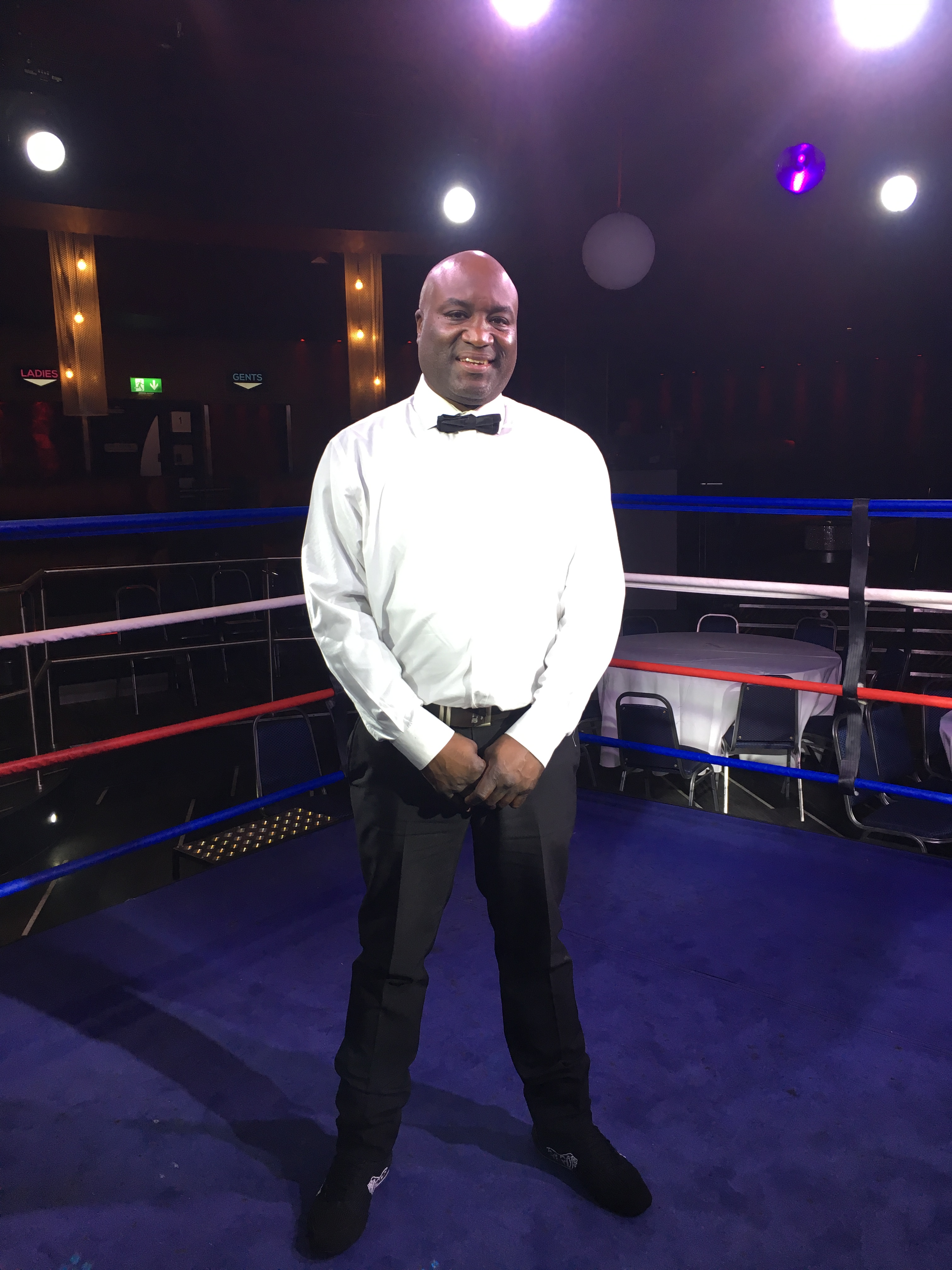

Personal information
- Nickname: Alexander the Great
- Nationality: British
- Born: 17 July 1973 (age 53) Tooting, London, England
- Height: 5 ft 8 1/2 in (174 cm)
- Weight: Light middleweight

Boxing career
- Reach: 72 in (183 cm)
- Stance: Orthodox

Boxing record
- Total fights: 27
- Wins: 24
- Win by KO: 18
- Losses: 3

Wayne Alexander (born 17 July 1973) is a British former professional boxer who competed from 1995 to 2006. He challenged once for the WBO light middleweight title in 2001. At regional level, he held the British light middleweight title from 2000 to 2001 and the EBU European light middleweight title in 2002.

== Amateur Highlights ==
Alexander won the 1994 Amateur Boxing Association British light-middleweight title, when boxing out of the Lynn ABC. The ABA final was shown on BBC1 Sports Night with the late Harry Carpenter commentating.

- 1990 London ABA Class B 67 kg champion.
- National Junior ABA Class B 67 kg champion.
- 1994 London ABA Light middleweight championship.
- 3 time SE London ABA Light middleweight champion in 1993, 1994 & 1995.
- Represented England in the 1994 & 1995 Liverpool Multi-Nations.
- Represented England against Denmark in 1994.
- Represented England against Scotland in 1995.

== Professional highlights ==
- 2006-03-04 defended the World Boxing Union Light Middleweight Title beating Thomas McDonagh
- 2004-09-10 won the World Boxing Union Light Middleweight Title beating Mehrdud Takaloo
- 2002-01-19 won the vacant EBU (European) Light Middleweight Title beating Paolo Pizzamiglio
- 2001-11-17 defended the BBBofC British Light Middleweight Title beating Joe Townsley
- 2001-02-10 fought for WBO World Light Middleweight Title against Harry Simon but lost by TKO in the fifth round.
- 2000-02-19 won the vacant BBBofC British Light Middleweight Title beating Paul Samuels
- 1999-01-23 won the vacant BBBofC Southern Area Light Middleweight Title beating Ojay Abrahams

His professional fights have been showcased on Sky TV and he has also made an appearance on Box Nation. In November 2013, he joined the board of WBU Europe.

He was inducted into the British Hall Of Fame in September 2026.
