= Gary Woolcombe =

English boxer

Personal information
- Nickname: Hot Stuff
- Nationality: British
- Born: 4 August 1982 (age 44) Lewisham, London, England
- Height: 5 ft 11 in (180 cm)
- Weight: Light middleweight

Boxing career
- Stance: Orthodox

Boxing record
- Total fights: 30
- Wins: 28
- Win by KO: 10
- Losses: 2

Gary Woolcombe (born 4 August 1982) is a British former professional boxer who competed from 2003 to 2009. He held the British super welterweight title from 2007 to 2008.

== Professional boxing record ==
30 fights	28 wins	2 losses
By knockout	10	2
By decision	18	0

No.	Result	Record	Opponent	Type	Round, time	Date	Location	Notes
30	Win	28–2	(Ukraine) Roman Dzhuman	PTS	8	11 Sep 2009	(United Kingdom) Brentwood Centre, Brentwood, England	
29	Win	27–2	(Ukraine) Volodymyr Borovskyy	PTS	6	23 Apr 2009	(United Kingdom) The Troxy, London, England	
28	Win	26–2	(Latvia) Janis Cernauskas	PTS	6	15 Nov 2008	(United Kingdom) York Hall, London, England	
27	Loss	25–2	(United Kingdom) Ryan Rhodes	KO	9 (12)	18 Apr 2008	(United Kingdom) York Hall, London, England	Lost British super welterweight title
26	Win	25–1	(United Kingdom) Marcus Portman	RTD	8 (12)	8 Dec 2007	(United Kingdom) Robin Park Centre, Wigan, England	Won vacant British super welterweight title
25	Win	24–1	(United Kingdom) Jason Rushton	TKO	7 (8)	21 Sep 2007	(United Kingdom) York Hall, London, England	
24	Win	23–1	(United Kingdom) Anthony Young	TKO	4 (6)	15 Jun 2007	(United Kingdom) National Sports Centre, London, England	
23	Loss	22–1	(United Kingdom) Andrew Facey	TKO	5 (10)	26 Jan 2007	(United Kingdom) Goresbrook Leisure Centre, Dagenham, England	For English super welterweight title
22	Win	22–0	(Estonia) Aleksei Stoda	DQ	4 (6)	3 Nov 2006	(United Kingdom) Metrodome, Barnsley, England	
21	Win	21–0	(United Kingdom) Gilbert Eastman	TKO	7 (10)	26 May 2006	(United Kingdom) York Hall, London, England	Won British Southern Area super welterweight title
20	Win	20–0	(Portugal) Eugenio Monteiro	PTS	8	24 Mar 2006	(United Kingdom) York Hall, London, England	
19	Win	19–0	(United Kingdom) Lee Murtagh	TKO	4 (10)	27 Jan 2006	(United Kingdom) Goresbrook Leisure Centre, Dagenham, England	
18	Win	18–0	(United Kingdom) Mark Phillips	PTS	4	4 Nov 2005	(United Kingdom) York Hall, London, England	
17	Win	17–0	(United Kingdom) Delroy Mellis	RTD	8 (10)	7 Oct 2005	(United Kingdom) York Hall, London, England	
16	Win	16–0	(United Kingdom) Peter Dunn	TKO	6 (6)	19 Jun 2005	(United Kingdom) York Hall, London, England	
15	Win	15–0	(United Kingdom) Danny Parkinson	KO	3 (8)	20 May 2005	(United Kingdom) Elephant & Castle Centre, London, England	
14	Win	14–0	(United Kingdom) Matt Scriven	TKO	4 (8)	29 Apr 2005	(United Kingdom) Elephant & Castle Centre, London, England	
13	Win	13–0	(United Kingdom) Ernie Smith	PTS	6	5 Mar 2005	(United Kingdom) Elephant & Castle Centre, London, England	
12	Win	12–0	(United Kingdom) Howard Clarke	PTS	6	12 Feb 2005	(United Kingdom) Mountbatten, Portsmouth, England	
11	Win	11–0	(United Kingdom) Peter Dunn	PTS	4	11 Dec 2004	(United Kingdom) ExCeL Arena, London, England	
10	Win	10–0	(United Kingdom) Keith Jones	PTS	4	19 Nov 2004	(United Kingdom) York Hall, London, England	
9	Win	9–0	(United Kingdom) Geraint Harvey	PTS	4	24 Sep 2004	(United Kingdom) York Hall, London, England	
8	Win	8–0	(Lithuania) Ivor Bonavic	PTS	4	5 Jun 2004	(United Kingdom) York Hall, London, England	
7	Win	7–0	(United Kingdom) David Kirk	PTS	4	7 May 2004	(United Kingdom) York Hall, London, England	
6	Win	6–0	(United Kingdom) Leeroy Williamson	PTS	6	14 Feb 2004	(United Kingdom) New Connaught Rooms, London, England	
5	Win	5–0	(United Kingdom) Ernie Smith	PTS	4	7 Feb 2004	(United Kingdom) York Hall, London, England	
4	Win	4–0	(United Kingdom) John Butler	PTS	4	18 Nov 2003	(United Kingdom) York Hall, London, England	
3	Win	3–0	(United Kingdom) Peter Buckley	PTS	6	25 Sep 2003	(United Kingdom) York Hall, London, England	
2	Win	2–0	(United Kingdom) Arv Mittoo	PTS	6	22 Jul 2003	(United Kingdom) York Hall, London, England	
1	Win	1–0	(United Kingdom) Paul McIlwain	TKO	2 (6)	15 May 2003	(United Kingdom) Marriott Hotel, London, England	
