= José Luis Navarro (footballer) =

Spanish footballer and manager

Personal information
- Full name: José Luis Navarro del Valle
- Date of birth: 27 May 1936
- Place of birth: Aranjuez, Community of Madrid, Spain
- Date of death: 13 January 2020 (aged 83)
- Place of death: Córdoba, Spain
- Height: 1.78 m (5 ft 10 in)
- Position: Defender

Senior career*
Years	Team	Apps	(Gls)
1954–1970	Córdoba		
President of Association of Veteran Footballers
- * Club domestic league appearances and goals

José Luis Navarro del Valle (27 May 1936 – 13 January 2020) was a Spanish footballer who played as a defender for Córdoba in the 1950s and 1960s.

He spent all 16 seasons of his playing career with Córdoba, thus being part of the so-called one-club men group, and also a historical member of the club, who still holds the records for both the most seasons and the most matches played in the club's history with over 300.

== Playing career ==
Born in Aranjuez on 27 May 1936, Navarro began playing football for a hometown club, remaining there until he was signed by the Tercera División club Córdoba in 1954, aged 18. Two years later, in 1956, he was one of the architects of the club's promotion, making his Segunda División debut on 9 September of that year, already as captain, despite still being only 20. He was a technical player who demonstrated "complete dedication to his colours".

A few years later, Navarro played a crucial role in the Córdoba team that won the 1961–62 Segunda División, thus achieving promotion to the Spanish top flight, where it stayed for seven years, until its relegation in 1969; he then retired in the following year, in 1970, at the age of 34. In total, he scored 12 goals in 319 official matches for Córdoba throughout his 16 seasons at the club, both of which still are club records, including 113 in La Liga, 138 in the Second, 19 in the Third, plus 13 in promotion matches, and 29 in the Copa del Rey.

== Later life ==
After his career as a player ended, Navarro remained linked to Córdoba, being a common presence in the box at Arcángel, as well as at events of the club. He also presided over the Association of Veteran Footballers for over a decade.

For a long time, he was the owner of the ball used in the kick-off of the club's La Liga debut against Recreativo de Huelva in 1962, which he ended up giving to the museum a few years before he died.

== Death ==
Navarro died at the Reina Sofía Hospital in Córdoba on the morning of 13 January 2020, at the age of 83, after failing to survive complications from a surgery to a liver tumor.

== Honours ==
Córdoba

- Segunda División:
  - Champions (1): 1961–62
