= Scott Dixon (boxer) =

Scottish boxer

Personal information
- Nickname: Super
- Nationality: Scottish
- Born: 28 September 1976 (age 49) Hamilton, South Lanarkshire, Scotland
- Height: 6 ft 0 in (183 cm)
- Weight: Welterweight; Light-middleweight; Super-middleweight

Boxing career
- Reach: 76 in (193 cm)
- Stance: Orthodox

Boxing record
- Total fights: 59
- Wins: 42
- Win by KO: 14
- Losses: 13
- Draws: 4

Scott Dixon (born 28 September 1976) is a Scottish professional boxer. He held the Commonwealth welterweight title in 2000 and challenged for the British welterweight title in 1999. He has been based in Malta since 2005.

== Career ==
Dixon was first trained by his grandfather Toby.

He was Brad Pitt's body double in the film Snatch.

He was banned by the Malta Boxing Federation in 2009 for organising unsanctioned boxing without a license.

Dixon retired in 2022 after a long-anticipated fight with Ludvic 'The Buġibba Bomber' Muscat.

== Legal issues ==
In 2005, Dixon was arrested for attempted murder in Glasgow.

In October 2009, Dixon was extradited to Malta from the United Kingdom on charges of conspiring to traffic 446 kg of cannabis. The drug haul was at the time the largest drug haul in Maltese history. He pleaded not guilty.

In a 2014 libel case filed by TV presenter Stephanie Chirchop against journalists Julia Farrugia and Karl Stagno Navarra, it emerged that Dixon and his then-girlfriend Chircop filed a police report claiming Silvio Scerri, chief of staff to Home Affairs Minister Manuel Mallia, plotted to have Dixon killed by a Polish man. The minister stood by Scerri and claimed the allegations were false. In November 2014, police Inspector Chris Pullicino suggested the report may have been false.

In February 2014, Dixon was acquitted of cocaine possession after being arrested in St. Julian's 2 years prior. He was acquitted as the alleged cocaine was actually paracetamol.

== Personal life ==
Scott Dixon is the grandson of Newarthill boxer Toby Dixon.

In 2004, Dixon was abducted by Garry McMillan and 5 others who beat him up and left him for dead. He suffered 2 broken legs. McMillan was jailed for 5 years for the assault.

In 2019, Dixon released his autobiography Super: The Road from Hell.

Dixon converted to Christianity in 1999 while training under boxer-turned-evangelist Jimmy Tibbs in East London.

Dixon is a fan of Rangers F.C. and briefly played in the youth programme.

Known for his many tattoos including on his face, Dixon estimated having 35-40 tattoos by 2022.
