= Javier Castillejo =

Spanish boxer (born 1968)

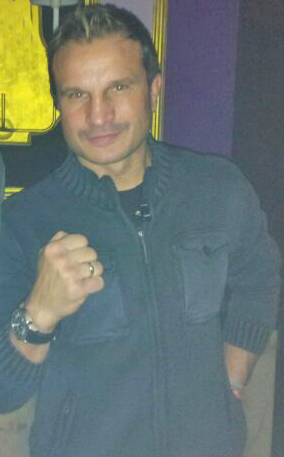

Personal information
- Nicknames: El Lince de Parla ("The Lynx of Parla")
- Born: Francisco Javier Castillejo Rodríguez; 22 March 1968 (age 58) Parla, Madrid, Spain
- Height: 5 ft 11 in (180 cm)
- Weight: Welterweight; Light-middleweight; Middleweight

Boxing career
- Reach: 70 in (178 cm)
- Stance: Orthodox

Boxing record
- Total fights: 72
- Wins: 62
- Win by KO: 43
- Losses: 8
- Draws: 1
- No contests: 1

Francisco Javier Castillejo Rodríguez (born 22 March 1968), commonly known as Javier Castillejo, is a Spanish former professional boxer who competed from 1988 to 2009. He held multiple world championships in two weight classes, including the World Boxing Council (WBC) light-middleweight title twice between 1999 and 2005, and the World Boxing Association (WBA) middleweight title from 2006 to 2007. At regional level he held the European light-middleweight title twice between 1994 and 1998, and the European Union middleweight title in 2002.

== Professional career ==
Castillejo made his professional debut on 22 July 1988, when he outpointed Ángel Díez over six rounds in Madrid. He had an immediate rematch with Díez, on 2 September of the same year. Their second fight resulted in Castillejo's first knockout win, when he beat Diez in the fourth round. On 4 November, he had his first fight outside Madrid, and his first knockout win in the first round, when he beat Juan Perez in Torrejón.

Castillejo had four more wins, before he was defeated for the first time. On 19 August 1989, he lost an eight-round decision to Del Bryan, in Benidorm. But he followed that loss with a streak of twenty two victories in a row.

Among the most notable wins during that streak were a fourth-round knockout on 19 October 1990, of Alfonzo Redondo, which gave Castillejo the Spanish Welterweight Championship, at Leganés. On 5 July 1991, he retained that national championship, with another fourth-round knockout victory, this time against Domingo Sanchez, in Lugo. On 10 April 1992, Castillejo got his first win against a former or future world champion when he knocked out former IBF lightweight champion, Puerto Rican Harry Arroyo, in three rounds at Leganes. He followed that victory with another win against former WBC light welterweight champion Saoul Mamby of Jamaica, by an eight-round decision on 15 May, at Bilbao. On 12 December of that year, Castillejo added the WBC's Mundo Hispano light middleweight title, when he defeated Enrique Areco by a twelve-round decision in Oviedo.

=== First title shot ===
Despite the fact that he had not fought outside Spain as a professional yet and thus he had little international fan recognition as a boxer, Castillejo received his first world title try, when he challenged Julio César Vásquez of Argentina, for Vazquez's WBA light middleweight title, on 24 April 1993, also in Leganes. Vazquez outpointed him over 12 rounds, ending his 22 fight winning streak.

After defending his Mundo Hispano regional title with success in a rematch with Victor Hugo Sclarandi on 29 October of that year by a knockout in five rounds, Castillejo finally had his first fight abroad when he beat Bernard Razzano by a knockout in six rounds, at Dijon, France, to conquer the European light middleweight title. He defended the title successfully four times, then lost it, on 3 January 1995 to the then WBA light middleweight champion Laurent Boudouani, in Épernay, France, by knockout in the ninth round.

His next fight was a victory by disqualification in six rounds on 14 July against Carlos Rocha Tovar in Seville. The victory against Tovar was followed by a rematch with Boudouani, who would once again defeat Castillejo, this time around by a twelve-round decision, at Levallois, 6 January 1996.

Castillejo then won six more fights in a row before fighting for a world title again. He regained the EBU light middleweight title by knocking out the former WBA welterweight title challenger, Ahmed Dottuev, in round twelve at Suffolk, England, on 2 July 1998.

=== First world title ===
On 29 January 1999, Castillejo got his second chance at becoming a world champion. He outpointed Lineal and WBC light middleweight champion Keith Mullings over twelve rounds to join a handful of world champions to come from Spain. Despite some protests from Mullings' management team, the judges' decision remained, and Castillejo held the WBC title.

=== Losing the title to De La Hoya ===
After five defenses, where Castillejo retained the title, a fight was set between him and Oscar De La Hoya. It was Castillejo's first big time, Pay Per View event. Many fans, perhaps ignoring Castillejo's achievements in Europe and as defending world champion, regarded Castillejo as another stepping stone in De La Hoya's career. Castillejo commented to this regard, saying on a press conference before the fight, which was held in Las Vegas, that "(he) didn't come to Las Vegas to do tourism, but to defend (his) title". Castillejo lasted the twelve round distance with De La Hoya, but was sent to the canvas seconds before the fight ended, and lost a unanimous twelve-round decision and his world title, on 23 June 2001.

After six months, Castillejo returned to the boxing ring, beating the well regarded Xavier Moya by a knockout in five rounds, On 11 January 2002, to win the vacant European Community's Junior Middleweight title, in Barcelona.

On 12 July 2002, he partially regained the WBC light middleweight title, when he beat Roman Karmazin by a twelve-round unanimous decision in Madrid, for the WBC's "Interim" title. This interim recognition was later retired from him, however, because he did not fight the WBC's recognized champion, which at the time was Shane Mosley, who had suffered an injury and was unable to box for the period being.

Castillejo then won four fights in a row, all by knockout.

He fought Fernando Vargas, in a fight that was supposed to be for the WBA's vacant light middleweight title, on 20 August 2005, in Chicago. It was decided ultimately to make the bout a ten-round affair instead of a world championship fight. Despite being dropped in round three, Castillejo was able to last ten rounds with fellow former world light middleweight champion Vargas, but he lost a ten-round decision to the Mexican-American.

=== Winning a middleweight title ===
On 15 July 2006, Castillejo sprang back on the boxing scene by defeating younger Felix Sturm of Germany to seize the WBA middleweight belt in an exciting fight. Sturm, making his first title defense, was headed to a one-sided win until Castillejo (61–6, 41 knockouts) caught him with a left hook against the ropes with 13 seconds left in the 10th Round.

Castillejo, then hit Sturm (27–2, 11 knockouts) with three uppercuts before the referee called the fight, making Castillejo, 38 at the time of his upset victory, the oldest man to win a recognized version on the World Middleweight Championship. He lost his title in his first defence against Argentine Mariano Natalio Carrera via a disputed 11th-round TKO. Later on, Carrera tested positive for Clenbuterol and was suspended for 6 months by the WBA, thus Castillejo regained his title on 23 February. . He lost the title 28 April 2007 in a rematch against Felix Sturm. He fought Mariano Natalio Carrera again on 13 November 2007, this time winning by KO in the 6th round.

== Professional boxing record ==
72 fights	62 wins	8 losses
By knockout	43	2
By decision	18	6
By disqualification	1	0
Draws	1	
No contests	1	

No.	Result	Record	Opponent	Type	Round, time	Date	Location	Notes
72	Draw	62–8–1 (1)	Pablo Navascues	MD	10	4 Apr 2009	La Cubierta, Leganés, Spain	
71	Loss	62–8 (1)	Sebastian Sylvester	KO	12 (12), 1:53	12 Apr 2008	Jahnsportforum, Neubrandenburg, Germany	For European middleweight title
70	Win	62–7 (1)	Mariano Natalio Carrera	KO	6 (12), 2:14	13 Nov 2007	Hohenstaufenhalle, Göppingen, Germany	
69	Loss	61–7 (1)	Felix Sturm	UD	12	28 Apr 2007	König Pilsener Arena, Oberhausen, Germany	Lost WBA middleweight title
68	NC	61–6 (1)	Mariano Natalio Carrera	TKO	11 (12), 1:53	2 Dec 2006	Estrel Hotel, Berlin, Germany	WBA (Regular) middleweight title at stake; Originally a TKO win for Carrera, later ruled an NC after he failed a drug test
67	Win	61–6	Felix Sturm	TKO	10 (12), 2:47	15 Jul 2006	Color Line Arena, Hamburg, Germany	Won WBA (Regular) middleweight title
66	Win	60–6	Luis Carmona	TKO	2 (10)	3 Feb 2006	Santa Cruz de Tenerife, Spain	
65	Win	59–6	Presente Brito	PTS	8	4 Nov 2005	La Cubierta, Leganés, Spain	
64	Loss	58–6	Fernando Vargas	UD	10	20 Aug 2005	Allstate Arena, Rosemont, Illinois, US	
63	Win	58–5	Enrique Campos	TKO	5 (8)	11 Jun 2004	La Cubierta, Leganés, Spain	
62	Win	57–5	Genaro Rios	TKO	3 (10)	16 Apr 2004	La Cubierta, Leganés, Spain	
61	Win	56–5	Ignacio Solar	TKO	2 (10), 2:26	12 Sep 2003	La Cubierta, Leganés, Spain	
60	Win	55–5	Diego Castillo	TKO	1 (12)	9 May 2003	La Cubierta, Leganés, Spain	Retained WBC interim light-middleweight title
59	Win	54–5	Roman Karmazin	UD	12	12 Jul 2002	Club Polideportivo, Parla, Spain	Won vacant WBC interim light-middleweight title
58	Win	53–5	Pierre Moreno	TKO	7 (10)	26 Apr 2002	Palau Blaugrana, Barcelona, Spain	Retained European Union light-middleweight title
57	Win	52–5	Xavier Moya	TKO	5 (10)	11 Jan 2002	Palau Blaugrana, Barcelona, Spain	Won inaugural European Union light-middleweight title
56	Loss	51–5	Oscar De La Hoya	UD	12	23 Jun 2001	MGM Grand Garden Arena, Paradise, Nevada, US	Lost WBC light-middleweight title
55	Win	51–4	Javier Martinez Rodriguez	TKO	4 (12), 1:43	21 Oct 2000	Salon 21, Mexico City, Mexico	Retained WBC light-middleweight title
54	Win	50–4	Tony Marshall	UD	12	21 Jul 2000	La Cubierta, Leganés, Spain	Retained WBC light-middleweight title
53	Win	49–4	Juan Rondon	TKO	3 (10)	14 Apr 2000	La Cubierta, Leganés, Spain	
52	Win	48–4	Mohamed Boualleg	KO	8 (10)	17 Mar 2000	Ciudad Real, Spain	
51	Win	47–4	Michael Rask	TKO	7 (12), 1:41	17 Dec 1999	La Cubierta, Leganés, Spain	Retained WBC light-middleweight title
50	Win	46–4	Paolo Roberto	TKO	7 (12), 1:47	10 Sep 1999	La Cubierta, Leganés, Spain	Retained WBC light-middleweight title
49	Win	45–4	Humberto Aranda	TKO	4 (12), 2:52	14 May 1999	Pabellón Europa, Leganés, Spain	Retained WBC light-middleweight title
48	Win	44–4	Keith Mullings	MD	12	29 Jan 1999	La Cubierta, Leganés, Spain	Won WBC light-middleweight title
47	Win	43–4	Cristinel Acatrinei	TKO	2 (8)	16 Oct 1998	La Cubierta, Leganés, Spain	
46	Win	42–4	Ahmet Dottuev	TKO	12 (12), 1:38	2 Jul 1998	Corn Exchange, Ipswich, England	Won vacant European light-middleweight title
45	Win	41–4	Fernando Jose Riera	PTS	10	18 Mar 1997	Valencia, Spain	Won Spanish light-middleweight title
44	Win	40–4	Juan Ramon Medina	TKO	8 (12)	12 Jul 1996	Hernani, Spain	Won WBC Mundo Hispano light-middleweight title
43	Win	39–4	Tibor Horvath	TKO	4 (6)	16 May 1996	Madrid, Spain	
42	Win	38–4	Stefan Driscu	TKO	2 (8)	7 Mar 1996	Madrid, Spain	
41	Loss	37–4	Laurent Boudouani	UD	12	6 Jan 1996	Palais des sports Marcel-Cerdan, Levallois-Perret, France	For European light-middleweight title
40	Win	37–3	Carlos Rocha Tomar	DQ	6 (6)	14 Jul 1995	Seville, Spain	
39	Loss	36–3	Laurent Boudouani	TKO	9 (12)	3 Jan 1995	Épernay, France	Lost European light-middleweight title
38	Win	36–2	Ludovic Proto	TKO	8 (12)	23 Jul 1994	Boiro, Spain	Retained European light-middleweight title
37	Win	35–2	Patrick Vungbo	PTS	12	29 May 1994	Leganés, Spain	Retained European light-middleweight title
36	Win	34–2	Valentino Manca	TKO	3 (12)	25 Mar 1994	Córdoba, Spain	Retained European light-middleweight title
35	Win	33–2	Santo Colombo	TKO	3 (12)	19 Feb 1994	Leganés, Spain	Retained European light-middleweight title
34	Win	32–2	Bernard Razzano	RTD	6 (12)	11 Jan 1994	Dijon, France	Won European light-middleweight title
33	Win	31–2	Hugo Daniel Sclarandi	KO	5 (12)	29 Oct 1993	Leganés, Spain	Retained WBC Mundo Hispano light-middleweight title
32	Win	30–2	Javier Rivera	TKO	4 (8)	25 Jun 1993	Leganés, Spain	
31	Loss	29–2	Julio César Vásquez	UD	12	24 Apr 1993	Polideportivo Parquesur Sport, Leganés, Spain	For WBA light-middleweight title
30	Win	29–1	Jesus Carlos Velez	PTS	8	26 Mar 1993	Leganés, Spain	
29	Win	27–1	Enrique Areco	UD	12	12 Dec 1992	Palacio Municipal de Deportes, Oviedo, Spain	Won vacant WBC Mundo Hispano light-middleweight title
28	Win	27–1	Antonio Campbell	KO	3 (8)	13 Oct 1992	Leganés, Spain	
27	Win	26–1	Vasile Citea	PTS	8	17 Jul 1992	Leganés, Spain	
26	Win	25–1	Jorge Sclarandi	UD	8	19 Jun 1992	Leganés, Spain	
25	Win	24–1	Saoul Mamby	PTS	8	15 May 1992	Bilbao, Spain	
24	Win	23–1	Harry Arroyo	TKO	3 (8)	10 Apr 1992	Leganés, Spain	
23	Win	22–1	Edison Martinez	KO	3 (8)	14 Mar 1992	Leganés, Spain	
22	Win	21–1	Lindon Scarlett	PTS	8	8 Feb 1992	Polideportivo Parquesur Sport, Leganés, Spain	
21	Win	20–1	Gejza Stipak	RTD	4 (8), 3:00	17 Jan 1992	Leganés, Spain	
20	Win	19–1	Patrick Vungbo	TKO	5 (8)	6 Dec 1991	Leganés, Spain	
19	Win	18–1	Domingo Sanchez	TKO	4 (10)	5 Jul 1991	Lugo, Spain	Retained Spanish welterweight title
18	Win	17–1	Juan Rosario	TKO	6 (8)	18 May 1991	Madrid, Spain	
17	Win	16–1	Eric Dindaine	PTS	8	21 Dec 1990	Leganés, Spain	
16	Win	15–1	Alfonso Redondo	TKO	4 (10)	19 Oct 1990	Leganés, Spain	Won Spanish welterweight title
15	Win	14–1	Jose Salinas	KO	1 (8)	17 Aug 1990	Almería, Spain	
14	Win	13–1	Claudio Salgado	TKO	1 (6)	14 Jul 1990	Parla, Spain	
13	Win	12–1	Mateo Valdez	TKO	2 (8)	31 May 1990	Madrid, Spain	
12	Win	11–1	Felix Rodriguez	TKO	5 (8)	5 May 1990	Zaragoza, Spain	
11	Win	10–1	Carlos Tavarez	TKO	2 (6)	16 Feb 1990	Bilbao, Spain	
10	Win	9–1	Louie Antuna	PTS	6	30 Dec 1989	Santoña, Spain	
9	Win	8–1	Jimmy Bartes	TKO	2 (6)	16 Nov 1989	Madrid, Spain	
8	Loss	7–1	Del Bryan	PTS	8	19 Aug 1989	Benidorm, Spain	
7	Win	7–0	Victor Carvalho	PTS	6	29 Jul 1989	Madrid, Spain	
6	Win	6–0	Juan Antonio Lopez	PTS	8	14 Jun 1989	Palacio de Deportes, Madrid, Spain	
5	Win	5–0	Modesto Villardell	TKO	1 (6)	23 Feb 1989	Madrid, Spain	
4	Win	4–0	Santiago Vasquez	PTS	6	19 Nov 1988	Irun, Spain	
3	Win	3–0	Juan Perez	TKO	1 (4)	4 Nov 1988	Torrejón de Ardoz, Spain	
2	Win	2–0	Angel Diez	TKO	4 (6)	2 Sep 1988	San Martín de Valdeiglesias, Spain	
1	Win	1–0	Angel Diez	PTS	6	22 Jul 1988	Madrid, Spain	

== Titles in boxing ==
=== Major world titles ===
- WBC light-middleweight champion (154 lbs) (2x)
- WBA middleweight champion (160 lbs)

=== Interim world titles ===
- WBC interim light-middleweight champion (154 lbs)

=== Secondary major world titles (Note: The secondary champion lineage lists the Regular or Unified champions while the primary champion is occupied.) ===
- WBA (Regular) middleweight champion (Note: Castillejo was the Secondary champion from 15 July – 14 December 2006) (160 lbs)

=== Regional/International titles ===
- Spanish welterweight champion (147 lbs)
- Spanish light-middleweight champion (154 lbs)
- European Union light-middleweight champion (154 lbs)
- EBU light-middleweight champion (154 lbs) (2x)
- WBC Mundo Hispano light-middleweight champion (154 lbs) (2x)

== Pay-per-view bouts ==
Date	Fight	Billing	Buys	Network
June 23, 2001	De La Hoya vs. Castillejo	The Quest	400,000	HBO

== See also ==
- List of light-middleweight boxing champions
- List of middleweight boxing champions
- List of WBA world champions
- List of WBC world champions
- List of European Boxing Union light-middleweight champions

== Notes ==
Sporting positions
Regional boxing titles
Preceded by Alfonso Redondo	Spanish welterweight champion 19 October 1990 – December 1992; Vacated	Vacant Title next held by Javier Martinez Rodriguez
Inaugural champion	WBC Mundo Hispano light-middleweight champion 12 December 1992 – January 1994; Vacated	Vacant Title next held by Jose Luis Navarro
Preceded by Bernard Razzano	European light-middleweight champion 11 January 1994 – 3 January 1995	Succeeded by Laurent Boudouani
Preceded by Juan Ramon Medina	WBC Mundo Hispano light-middleweight champion 12 July 1996 – April 1997; Vacated	Vacant Title next held by Ailton Pessoa
Preceded by Fernando Jose Riera	Spanish light-middleweight champion 18 March 1997 – January 1999; Vacated	Vacant Title next held by Javier Martinez Rodriguez
Vacant Title last held by Davide Ciarlante	European light-middleweight champion 2 July 1998 – November 1998; Vacated	Vacant Title next held by Mamadou Thiam
New title	European Union light-middleweight champion 11 January 2002 – July 2002; Vacated	Vacant Title next held by Jorge Sendra
Minor world boxing titles
Preceded by Felix Sturm	WBA (Regular) middleweight champion 15 July 2006 – 14 December 2006	Vacant Title next held by Gennady Golovkin
World boxing titles
Preceded by Keith Mullings	WBC light-middleweight champion 29 January 1999 – 23 June 2001	Succeeded by Oscar De La Hoya
Preceded by Keith Mullings	Lineal light-middleweight champion 29 January 1999 – 23 June 2001	Succeeded by Oscar De La Hoya
New title	WBC light-middleweight champion Interim title 12 July 2002 – 5 March 2005; Promoted	Vacant Title next held by Sergio Martínez
Vacant Title last held by Winky Wright	WBC light-middleweight champion 5 March 2005 – 30 May 2005; Stripped	Vacant Title next held by Ricardo Mayorga
Vacant Title last held by Jermain Taylor	WBA middleweight champion 14 December 2006 – 28 April 2007	Succeeded by Felix Sturm
