= Edison Miranda =

Colombian boxer (born 1981)

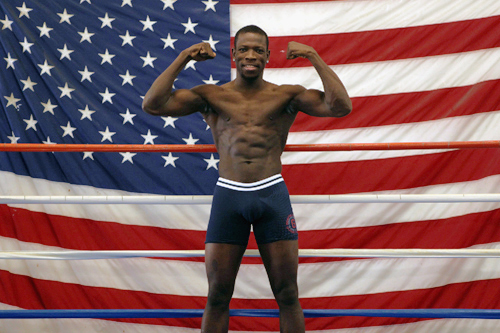
- Miranda in 2009

Personal information
- Nickname: Pantera ("Panther")
- Nationality: Colombian
- Born: 7 January 1981 (age 45) Buenaventura, Colombia
- Height: 5 ft 11 in (180 cm)
- Weight: Middleweight; Super middleweight; Light heavyweight; Cruiserweight; Heavyweight

Boxing career
- Reach: 77 1/2 in (197 cm)
- Stance: Orthodox

Boxing record
- Total fights: 50
- Wins: 37
- Win by KO: 32
- Losses: 13

Edison Miranda (born 7 January 1981) is a Colombian former professional boxer who competed from 2001 to 2021. He challenged once each for the IBF middleweight and super middleweight world titles, and was considered to be one of the most dangerous contenders at middleweight due to his exceptionally high knockout-to-win percentage.

== Early life ==
Miranda was born in 1981 in Buenaventura, Colombia and was abandoned by his mother when he was one month old. At age 9, a precocious Miranda began a quest to locate his mother. He hitched rides on truck beds over the course of hundreds of miles and was able to find his uncle working at a construction site. His uncle informed him that if he was really the little boy his sister gave away, then he should have a birthmark on his leg whereas Miranda unveiled the 2-inch long circular proof. The man led him to his mother's new home, only to be abandoned again by his mother. By the time he was 12, he was working in the plantain fields. The next year, he had a full-time construction job. By the time he was 14, he was working as a cattle butcher. At age 15, Miranda took up boxing, training for a half-year before starting his amateur career. Miranda won 128 out of 132 fights, winning four Colombian national titles. Miranda won a bronze medal in the 2000 Olympic Trials in Argentina, but failed to qualify for the 2000 Colombian Olympic team.

== Professional career ==
=== Middleweight ===
132 fights later, Miranda became a professional boxer, but his journey was only halfway over. March 2002 saw Miranda's arrival in the Dominican Republic. Having been promised a shot at going to the United States to fight the top middleweight fighters in the world, Miranda continued with what he's best at – fighting – both in and out of the ring. Struggling to make ends meet, left homeless and hungry by an unfair contract, Miranda left the Dominican Republic and returned to Barranquilla on 24 December 2004. With the support of friends, he fulfilled his dream of making it as a boxer in the United States when he signed with Warrior's Boxing Promotions and then had his first American fight in Hollywood, Florida on 20 May 2005. In that fight, Miranda defeated Sam Reese by unanimous decision.

==== IBF title eliminator ====
Miranda fought Howard Eastman on 24 March 2006, at the Seminole Hard Rock Hotel and Casino in Hollywood, Florida. Miranda got off to a slow start but showed his tremendous power when consecutive right hands hurt Eastman in the fifth round. The experienced Eastman survived the round and came back strong by hurting Miranda in the next round. Miranda kept throwing his right hand, and in the seventh, he had Eastman hurt badly with a clean right cross to the jaw, followed by a left uppercut and then a vicious right uppercut that nailed Eastman under the chin. The referee stopped the fight, making Miranda the first man to stop Eastman. The victory made Miranda the mandatory challenger for IBF Middleweight Champion Arthur Abraham.

==== IBF title fight ====
Miranda fought Abraham on 23 September 2006 in Wetzlar, Germany. The fight was not without controversy. After three competitive rounds, Miranda broke Abraham's jaw with a right hand in round four. In round five, Miranda head-butted Abraham on the right side of his face. Abraham was seen turning away hurt with his mouth agape. Referee Randy Neumann stopped the fight and during the five-minute break, the doctor recommended to stop the fight to what he saw as a broken jaw from a legal punch. The referee decided to continue the fight and deducted two points from Miranda. Abraham fought the remainder of the fight with a visibly broken jaw that was grossly swollen at the end of the fight. In the seventh round, Miranda was docked two more points for low blows. Then in the eleventh round, Miranda landed another low blow and the referee took another point from him. Miranda lost the fight by unanimous decision. He would have lost even without the deduction of any points (although by MD only).

==== Miranda vs. Gibbs, Green ====
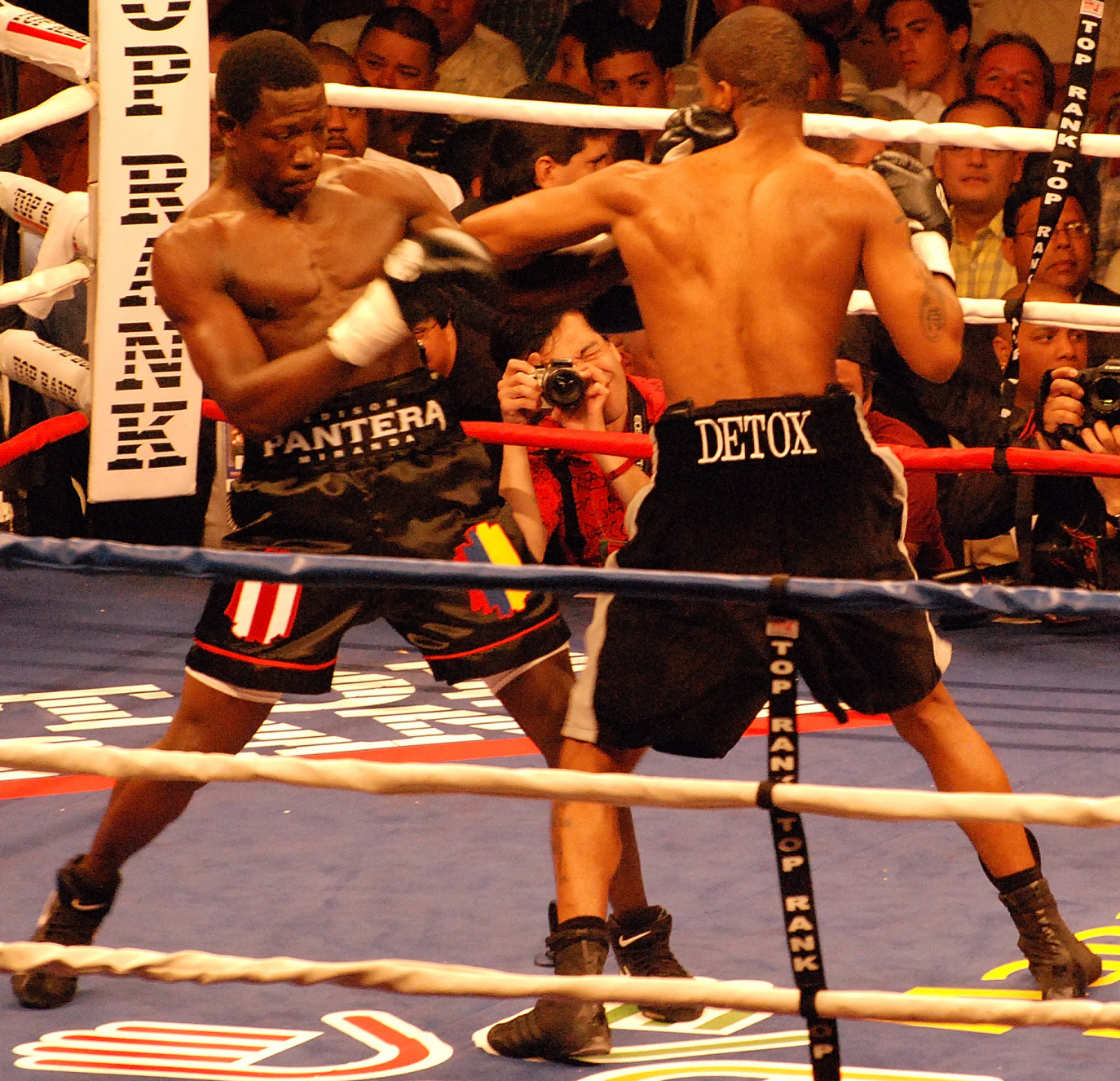
Miranda (left) vs. Green

On 16 December 2006, Miranda fought Willie Gibbs in Miami, Florida. Miranda landed a strong right hand that badly hurt Gibbs, causing him to stagger back into the ropes. Miranda then unloaded a volley of punches, concluding with a right hand followed by a left hook that connected flush on Gibbs' chin, sending him down and out in the first round.

On 3 March 2007, Miranda won a unanimous decision over Allan Green at the Roberto Clemente Coliseum in San Juan, Puerto Rico. Green knocked down Miranda with a left hook that landed on Miranda's chin in round eight. Despite that, Miranda dominated most of the fight and knocked Green down twice in the final round. The fight was fought at a catchweight of 162 lbs, foreshadowing Miranda's problems at making weight.

==== WBC title eliminator ====
On 19 May 2007, after losing nearly every round, Miranda was brutally stopped in the seventh round by Kelly Pavlik at the FedEx Forum in Memphis, Tennessee. After getting knocked down the first time in round six, Miranda spit out his mouthpiece, leading to a one-point deduction. It did not help him survive, since he was knocked down again in round six and once more in round seven. Referee Steve Smoger halted the fight with Miranda still down. The fight was a WBC title eliminator with the winner getting a shot at Middleweight champion Jermain Taylor. Pavlik went on to beat Taylor.

=== Super middleweight ===
After the loss to Pavlik, Miranda moved up to Super Middleweight and fought Henry Porras on 30 October 2007, at the Seminole Hard Rock Hotel and Casino in Hollywood, Florida. Miranda started out slowly, but soon found both his range and rhythm. Porras was a game opponent in the first two rounds, but as Miranda became more comfortable, he found openings in Porras' defense. Miranda unloaded a powerful barrage of punches on a defenseless Porras to force the referee to step in and stop the fight in the fifth round.

On 11 January 2008, Miranda viciously knocked out David Banks in the third round at the Seminole Hard Rock Hotel and Casino in Hollywood, Florida. The fight began with two feeling out rounds that saw Miranda use a consistent left jab to set up rights over the top and underneath of Banks' guard. In round three, Miranda landed a big right hand that caused Banks to collapse backwards and fall awkwardly halfway through the ropes. The knockout was named "Knockout of the Year" by ESPN.com's Dan Rafael, and also was accoladed as Ring Magazine Knockout of the Year for 2008.

==== Rematch with Abraham ====
On 21 June 2008, at the Seminole Hard Rock Hotel and Casino in Hollywood, Florida, Miranda lost to Arthur Abraham by fourth-round technical knockout. The fight took place at a catch weight of 166 pounds (75 kg), so Abraham's IBF Middleweight title was not on the line. Abraham spent much of the first and second rounds with his gloves high to his head and his back against the ring ropes, while Miranda threw power punches. Abraham blocked many of Miranda's punches, but a low blow drew a warning to Miranda and a brief rest period for Abraham. Abraham began to open up in the third round, landing right and left hands to Miranda's head. About 30 seconds into the fourth round, Abraham landed a clean left hook to the temple that knocked Miranda down. He got to his feet, but was caught by a sweeping left hook that knocked Miranda down again. Abraham ended the fight seconds later with a third left hand to the head that sent Miranda down again, bringing an automatic stoppage via the three-knockdown rule.

==== Fight with Lucian Bute ====
On 17 April 2010, Edison Miranda fought Lucian Bute in Montreal, Quebec, at Bell Centre in front of nearly 15000 fans. Miranda lost the first two rounds and he was knocked out during the third round with a solid right uppercut to the jaw. Miranda got back on his feet but the referee decided to stop the fight seconds after.

== Professional boxing record ==
50 fights	37 wins	13 losses
By knockout	32	5
By decision	5	7
By disqualification	0	1

No.	Result	Record	Opponent	Type	Round, time	Date	Location	Notes
50	Win	37–13	Olimpo Cespedes	KO	2 (6), 1:17	25 April 2024	Club La Pradera, Carmen de Apicalá, Colombia	
49	Loss	36–13	Jeison Troncoso	UD	10	17 April 2024	Club La Pradera, Carmen de Apicalá, Colombia	
48	Loss	36–12	Brayan Santander	UD	8	29 February 2024	Club La Pradera, Carmen de Apicalá, Colombia	
47	Loss	36–11	Carlouse Welch	KO	2 (10), 1:10	5 June 2021	Colegio Bachillerato Resguardo Indigena, San Antonio de Palmito, Colombia	
46	Win	36–10	Daniel Noguera	KO	1 (6), 2:21	7 September 2014	Patio Casa Los Caracoles, Tolú, Colombia	
45	Loss	35–10	Yuniel Dorticos	UD	10	10 July 2014	American Airlines Arena, Miami, Florida, U.S.	For WBC Latino cruiserweight title
44	Loss	35–9	Eleider Álvarez	UD	10	28 September 2013	Bell Centre, Montreal, Quebec, Canada	
43	Loss	35–8	Tony Bellew	TKO	9 (12), 1:54	8 September 2012	Alexandra Palace, London, England	For vacant WBC Silver International light heavyweight title
42	Loss	35–7	Isaac Chilemba	UD	10	3 February 2012	Texas Station, North Las Vegas, Nevada, U.S.	
41	Win	35–6	Kariz Kariuki	TKO	5 (8), 2:15	17 Dec 2011	Boardwalk Hall, Atlantic City, New Jersey, U.S.	
40	Loss	34–6	Yordanis Despaigne	DQ	5 (10), 0:45	29 July 2011	Cosmopolitan of Las Vegas, Paradise, Nevada, U.S.	Miranda disqualified for repeated low blows
39	Win	34–5	Rayco Saunders	UD	8	4 Jun 2011	Boardwalk Hall, Atlantic City, New Jersey, U.S.	
38	Loss	33–5	Lucian Bute	TKO	3 (12), 1:22	17 April 2010	Bell Centre, Montreal, Quebec, Canada	For IBF super middleweight title
37	Win	33–4	Francisco Sierra	KO	1 (12), 2:16	22 October 2009	Tachi Palace Hotel & Casino, Lemoore, California, U.S.	Won vacant WBO–NABO interim super middleweight title
36	Loss	32–4	Andre Ward	UD	12	16 May 2009	Oracle Arena, Oakland, California, U.S.	For NABF and WBO–NABO super middleweight titles
35	Win	32–3	Joey Vegas	TKO	5 (10), 2:31	20 March 2009	York Hall, London, England	
34	Win	31–3	Manuel Esparza	KO	3 (8), 0:57	14 January 2009	Hard Rock Live, Hollywood, Florida, U.S.	
33	Loss	30–3	Arthur Abraham	TKO	4 (12), 1:13	24 June 2008	Hard Rock Live, Hollywood, Florida, U.S.	
32	Win	30–2	David Banks	KO	3 (10), 1:15	11 January 2008	Hard Rock Live, Hollywood, Florida, U.S.	
31	Win	29–2	Henry Porras	TKO	5 (10), 2:45	30 October 2007	Hard Rock Live, Hollywood, Florida, U.S.	
30	Loss	28–2	Kelly Pavlik	TKO	7 (12), 1:54	19 May 2007	FedExForum, Memphis, Tennessee, U.S.	
29	Win	28–1	Allan Green	UD	10	3 March 2007	Roberto Clemente Coliseum, San Juan, Puerto Rico	
28	Win	27–1	Willie Gibbs	KO	1 (10), 2:59	16 December 2006	Miccosukee Resort & Gaming, Miami, Florida, U.S.	
27	Loss	26–1	Arthur Abraham	UD	12	23 September 2006	Rittal Arena, Wetzlar, Germany	For IBF middleweight title
26	Win	26–0	Howard Eastman	TKO	7 (12), 2:33	24 March 2006	Hard Rock Live, Hollywood, Florida, U.S.	
25	Win	25–0	Sherwin Davis	KO	3 (12), 0:37	21 October 2005	Hard Rock Live, Hollywood, Florida, U.S.	Retained IBF Latino and WBO–NABO middleweight titles; Won vacant WBO Latino middleweight title
24	Win	24–0	Hilario Guzman	UD	6	26 August 2005	Hard Rock Live, Hollywood, Florida, U.S.	
23	Win	23–0	Jose Varela	UD	12	16 June 2005	Seminole Casino, Coconut Creek, Florida, U.S.	Won vacant IBF Latino, WBO Latino, and WBO–NABO middleweight titles
22	Win	22–0	Sam Reese	UD	10	20 May 2005	Hard Rock Live, Hollywood, Florida, U.S.	
21	Win	21–0	Saul Torres	KO	1 (10), 2:59	26 February 2005	Romelio Martínez Stadium, Barranquilla, Colombia	
20	Win	20–0	Jonalis Reyes	KO	1	11 December 2004	San Pedro de Macorís, Dominican Republic	
19	Win	19–0	Darmel Castillo	TKO	5 (10), 1:14	29 August 2003	Magnum Eventos, Panama City, Panama	
18	Win	18–0	Feliberto Alvarez	KO	3 (8)	28 July 2003	Club San Carlos, Santo Domingo, Dominican Republic	
17	Win	17–0	Hector Rodriguez	KO	1	25 July 2003	Polideportivo, Moca, Dominican Republic	
16	Win	16–0	Meregildo De Los Santos	KO	1	20 July 2003	Cotuí, Dominican Republic	
15	Win	15–0	Manuel De la Rosa	KO	2 (10)	14 June 2003	La Romana, Dominican Republic	
14	Win	14–0	Jose Luis Robles	KO	1	15 April 2003	Club Los Cachorros, Santo Domingo, Dominican Republic	
13	Win	13–0	Danilo Serrano	KO	1	10 April 2003	Club Los Cachorros, Santo Domingo, Dominican Republic	
12	Win	12–0	Roberto Jimenez	KO	1	1 April 2003	Club Los Cachorros, Santo Domingo, Dominican Republic	
11	Win	11–0	Joselito del Rosario	KO	1 (10)	21 March 2003	Coliseo de boxeo Carlos "Teo" Cruz, Santo Domingo, Dominican Republic	
10	Win	10–0	Rafael de la Cruz	KO	2	15 June 2002	San Cristóbal, Dominican Republic	
9	Win	9–0	Joselito del Rosario	KO	1	12 June 2002	Club Los Cachorros, Santo Domingo, Dominican Republic	
8	Win	8–0	Nelson Gil	KO	1	5 June 2002	Estadio Olímpico Juan Pablo Duarte, Santo Domingo, Dominican Republic	
7	Win	7–0	Jose Chiquillo	KO	1	14 December 2001	Cartagena, Colombia	
6	Win	6–0	Alfonso Mosquera	TKO	1 (8), 3:00	5 October 2001	Roberto Durán Arena, Panama City, Panama	
5	Win	5–0	Fidel Sarmiento	KO	2	24 August 2001	Barranquilla, Colombia	
4	Win	4–0	Saul Torres	KO	1	18 May 2001	Barranquilla, Colombia	
3	Win	3–0	Vidal Diaz	TKO	1 (4)	27 April 2001	Polideportivo San Felipe, Barranquilla, Colombia	
2	Win	2–0	Luis Blandon	KO	1 (6)	30 March 2001	Barranquilla, Colombia	
1	Win	1–0	Jose Chiquillo	TKO	1	16 March 2001	Barranquilla, Colombia	

Sporting positions
Regional boxing titles
Vacant Title last held by Rogerio Cacciatore	IBF Latino middleweight champion 16 June 2005 – 23 September 2006; Lost bid for world title	Vacant Title next held by Hector Saldivia
Vacant Title last held by Mariano Natalio Carrera	WBO Latino middleweight champion 16 June 2005 – July 2005; Vacated	Vacant Title next held by Francisco Antonio Mora
Vacant Title last held by Randy Griffin	WBO–NABO middleweight champion 16 June 2005 – February 2006; Vacated	Vacant Title next held by Joey Gilbert
Vacant Title last held by Francisco Antonio Mora	WBO Latino middleweight champion 21 October 2005 – September 2006; Vacated	Vacant Title next held by Erik Rafael Esquivel
Vacant Title last held by Andre Dirrell	WBO–NABO super middleweight champion Interim title 22 October 2009 – April 2010; Vacated	Title discontinued
