= Glenn Catley =

British boxer

Personal information
- Nickname: Catman
- Nationality: British
- Born: 15 March 1972 (age 54) Frampton Cotterell, England
- Height: 5 ft 8 1/2 in (174 cm)
- Weight: Super middleweight

Boxing career
- Reach: 70 in (178 cm)
- Stance: Orthodox

Boxing record
- Wins: 29
- Win by KO: 22
- Losses: 7
- Draws: 0

Glenn Catley (born 15 March 1972) is a British retired professional boxer and former WBC super-middleweight World Champion.

== Biography ==
Catley was born in Frampton Cotterell, South Gloucestershire, England. Known as "Catman", he turned pro in 1993 as a Middleweight and Won 21 of his first 22 fights (including a victory over Kirkland Laing), and won the WBC International Middleweight Title against George Bocco. However, he then surprisingly lost this title to Hungarian Andras Galfi by TKO.

Catley came back from this unexpected setback and won the British Middleweight Title with a KO over world rated Neville Brown.

He then moved up to Super Middleweight and challenged WBC World Super Middleweight Title holder Richie Woodhall in 1998, but lost a majority decision in an all British battle. Woodhall did not perform well and many observers felt Catley had done enough to win.

Catley then had an impressive run of wins, capturing the WBO Intercontinental Super Middle title in a revenge victory over Andras Galfi, taking the IBF version against Andy Flute. Catley then travelled to Canada and scored a very impressive KO win over the teak tough and highly rated Eric Lucas. Lucas had never previously been knocked out.

These wins earned him another shot at the WBC title against World Champion Markus Beyer of Germany. In Frankfurt Catley again scored an impressive KO "on the road" (Germany being a notoriously difficult place for an away boxer to win), winning the World Title via 12th-round TKO.

Catley surprisingly lost the belt in his next fight, again in an "away" fight in South Africa against Dingaan Thobela, via 12th-round KO. Catley was leading comfortably, but seemed to tire in the heat late in the fight. Catley would later claim that he was cheated out of the title as the South African had been using "loaded" gloves.

In 2001, he got a chance to regain the Vacant WBC Super Middleweight Title against Eric Lucas. He travelled to Canada once more, but this time Lucas exacted revenge, and he was KO'd in the 7th.

He travelled to Germany to challenge Danilo Haussler for the European Title, and despite flooring Haussler in the 8th round, was somewhat harshly on the wrong end of a majority decision. Many observers felt this was a "Home Town" decision.

After a warm up against an Armenian journeyman, Catley again challenged Haussler, again in Germany. The fight was stopped after the German suffered an accidental headbutt, however he retained the title on a Technical Decision. Catley retired after this fight, which was on 1 February 2003.

He made a short comeback in 2006-7, winning KO's over two fairly respectable journeymen from Syria and Russia, before retiring for good.

== Professional boxing record ==
36 fights	29 wins	7 losses
By knockout	22	4
By decision	7	3

No.	Result	Record	Opponent	Type	Round, time	Date	Location	Notes
36	Win	29–7	Sergey Kharchenko	TKO	5 (8), 2:35	2007-02-24	Filton College Wise Campus, Bristol, England	
35	Win	28–7	Hussain Osman	TKO	3 (8), 1:10	2006-11-03	Dolman Exhibition Hall, Bristol, England	
34	Loss	27–7	Danilo Haussler	TD	5 (12)	2003-02-01	Chemnitz Arena, Chemnitz, Germany	For EBU European Super middleweight title. Fight stopped due to a cut on Haussler caused by an accidental head-butt.
33	Win	27–6	Vage Kocharyan	PTS	8	2002-07-10	Conference Centre, Wembley, London, England	
32	Loss	26–6	Danilo Haussler	MD	12	2002-03-09	Brandenburg Halle, Frankfurt, Germany	For EBU European Super middleweight title.
31	Loss	26–5	Éric Lucas	KO	7 (12), 2:00	2001-07-10	Molson Centre, Montreal, Quebec, Canada	For vacant WBC super middleweight title
30	Loss	26–4	Dingaan Thobela	KO	12 (12), 2:53	2000-09-02	Big Top Arena, Brakpan, South Africa	Lost WBC super middleweight title.
29	Win	26–3	Markus Beyer	TKO	12 (12), 0:53	2000-05-06	Ballsporthalle, Frankfurt, Germany	Won WBC super middleweight title
28	Win	25–3	Éric Lucas	TKO	12 (12), 2:05	1999-12-10	Molson Centre, Montreal, Quebec, Canada	WBC Super middleweight title eliminator
27	Win	24–3	Andy Flute	RTD	5 (12), 3:00	1998-12-05	Whitchurch Sports Centre, Bristol, England	Won IBF Inter-Continental Super middleweight title
26	Win	23–3	András Gálfi	PTS	12	1998-10-24	Whitchurch Sports Centre, Bristol, England	Won WBO Inter-Continental Super middleweight title
25	Loss	22–3	Richie Woodhall	MD	12	1998-09-05	Telford Ice Rink, Telford, England	For WBC super middleweight title
24	Win	22–2	Neville Brown	RTD	8 (12), 3:00	1998-01-17	Whitchurch Sports Centre, Bristol, England	Won BBBofC British Middleweight title
23	Loss	21–2	András Gálfi	TKO	7 (12), 2:49	1997-06-05	Whitchurch Sports Centre, Bristol, England	Lost WBC International Middleweight title
22	Win	21–1	Georges Boco	TKO	4 (12)	1997-01-21	Whitchurch Sports Centre, Bristol, England	Won WBC International Middleweight title
21	Win	20–1	Paul Wesley	TKO	7 (8)	1996-10-19	Whitchurch Sports Centre, Bristol, England	
20	Win	19–1	Lee Crocker	TKO	2 (8)	1996-04-26	Welsh Institute of Sport, Cardiff, Wales	
19	Win	18–1	Peter Vosper	TKO	2 (6), 1:20	1995-12-16	Welsh Institute of Sport, Cardiff, Wales	
18	Win	17–1	Carlos Christie	KO	3 (8), 1:38	1995-11-10	Marriott Hotel, Bristol, England	
17	Win	16–1	Carlos Christie	PTS	8	1995-10-28	Whitchurch Sports Centre, Bristol, England	
16	Win	15–1	John Duckworth	TKO	3 (6)	1995-09-30	Cardiff Arms Park, Cardiff, Wales	
15	Win	14–1	Quinn Paynter	TKO	1 (8)	1995-09-02	Wembley Stadium, Wembley, London, England	
14	Win	13–1	Kevin Adamson	KO	1 (8), 2:00	1995-07-28	Whitchurch Sports Centre, Bristol, England	
13	Win	12–1	Mark Lee Dawson	TKO	5 (8)	1995-05-06	Bath & West Country Showground, Shepton Mallet, England	
12	Win	11–1	Lee Blundell	TKO	6 (6)	1995-02-18	Bath & West Country Showground, Shepton Mallet, England	
11	Win	10–1	Kirkland Laing	TKO	5 (8)	1994-11-22	Whitchurch Sports Centre, Bristol, England	
10	Win	9–1	Martin Jolley	TKO	1 (6)	1994-07-02	Rugby Ground, Keynsham, England	
9	Win	8–1	Chris Davies	TKO	1 (4), 1:57	1994-05-25	Colston Hall, Bristol, England	
8	Loss	7–1	Carlo Colarusso	TKO	5 (8), 1:45	1994-03-23	Star Leisure Centre, Cardiff, Wales	
7	Win	7–0	Mark Chichocki	PTS	6	1994-03-10	Whitchurch Sports Centre, Bristol, England	
6	Win	6–0	Seamus Casey	PTS	4	1993-12-13	Odyssey Night Club, Bristol, England	
5	Win	5–0	Marty Duke	TKO	1 (4)	1993-11-03	Whitchurch Sports Centre, Bristol, England	
4	Win	4–0	Barry Thorogood	PTS	4	1993-09-13	Odyssey Nightclub, Bristol, England	
3	Win	3–0	Marty Duke	TKO	2 (4)	1993-08-31	Fairfield Halls, Croydon, London, England	
2	Win	2–0	Chris Vassiliou	KO	2 (6)	1993-06-26	Rugby Ground, Keynsham, England	
1	Win	1–0	Rick North	PTS	4	1993-05-27	Whitchurch Sports Centre, Bristol, England	Professional debut

== See also ==
- List of world super-middleweight boxing champions
- List of British world boxing champions

Sporting positions
Regional boxing titles
Preceded by Neville Brown	British middleweight champion 17 January 1998 – 1998; Vacated	Vacant Title next held by Howard Eastman
World boxing titles
Preceded by Markus Beyer	WBC super middleweight champion 6 May 2000 – 1 September 2000	Succeeded by Dingaan Thobela
