= Neville Brown =

British former boxer (born 1966)

Personal information
- Nickname: The Saint
- Nationality: English
- Born: 26 February 1966 (age 60)
- Height: 5 ft 10 in (1.78 m)
- Weight: Middleweight, super middleweight

Boxing career
- Reach: 72 in (180 cm)
- Stance: Orthodox

Boxing record
- Total fights: 40
- Wins: 32
- Win by KO: 26
- Losses: 8

Neville Brown (born 26 February 1966) is a British former boxer who was British middleweight champion between 1993 and 1998, and also fought for Commonwealth, European, and World titles.

== Career ==
From Burton-upon-Trent, Neville Brown first tasted success as an amateur, winning the ABA light-middleweight title in both 1987 and 1989. He had his first professional fight in November 1989, a fourth round stoppage of Spencer Alton. After winning his first eleven professional fights, he suffered his first defeat in July 1991, when he was stopped in the first round by Paul Wesley. He avenged that defeat three months later, stopping Wesley in the third round.

In November 1993, he challenged for Frank Grant's British middleweight title, stopping the defending champion in the seventh round. Two months later he successfully defended the title against Andy Flute. In July 1994, he had his first fight outside the UK when he travelled to Italy to challenge for Agostino Cardamone's European title; Cardamone stopped him in the seventh round. Back in the UK he made successful defences of his British title against Antonio Fernandez, Carlo Colarusso, and Shaun Cummins, all inside the distance.

In March 1996 he got a World title shot, challenging for Steve Collins' WBO super middleweight title. Collins had Brown down in the first round, and twice more in the eleventh before the fight was stopped.

Back down at middleweight, Brown made a successful defence of his British title in January 1997 against Willie Quinn. Three months later he made a second challenge for the European title, this time being stopped in the sixth by Hacine Cherifi. In January 1998 he lost his British title to Glenn Catley. After winning two of his next three fights, he faced Sam Soliman in June 2000 for the vacant Commonwealth middleweight title; Soliman stopped him in the ninth round. Brown subsequently retired from boxing.

Neville Brown’s first Boxing Gym used to be located in Burton-on-Trent under the bridge near the Derby Turn Roundabout for many years until it moved. Brown went on to work as a boxing coach and personal trainer, and returned to the ring in July 2014 for a charity exhibition fight against Collins.

== Professional boxing record ==
41 fights	32 wins	8 losses
By knockout	26	7
By decision	6	1
Draws	1	

No.	Result	Record	Opponent	Type	Round, time	Date	Location	Notes
40	Loss	32–8	(Australia) Sam Soliman	TKO	9 (12)	2000-06-19	(United Kingdom) Meadowside Leisure Centre, Burton upon Trent, England	For vacant Commonwealth (British Empire) Middleweight title.
39	Win	32–7	(United Kingdom) Jason Collins	TKO	2 (6), 1:48	2000-05-21	(United Kingdom) Pennine Hotel, Derby, England	
38	Loss	31–7	(United Kingdom) Chris Davies	TKO	2 (8)	2000-03-18	(United Kingdom) Kelvin Hall, Glasgow, Scotland	
37	Win	31–6	(United Kingdom) Errol McDonald	TKO	3 (10), 2:43	1999-07-17	(United Kingdom) The Dome Leisure Centre, Doncaster, England	
36	Loss	30–6	(United Kingdom) Glenn Catley	RTD	8 (12), 3:00	1998-01-17	(United Kingdom) Whitchurch Sports Centre, Bristol, England	Lost BBBofC British Middleweight title.
35	Loss	30–5	(France) Hacine Cherifi	TKO	6 (12), 2:44	1997-04-26	(United Kingdom) Green Bank Leisure Centre, Swadlincote, England	For EBU European Middleweight title.
34	Win	30–4	(United Kingdom) Willie Quinn	TKO	4 (12), 2:10	1997-01-18	(United Kingdom) Green Bank Leisure Centre, Swadlincote, England	Retained BBBofC British Middleweight title.
33	Loss	29–4	(Republic of Ireland) Steve Collins	TKO	11 (12), 0:54	1996-03-09	(Republic of Ireland) Green Glens Arena, Millstreet, Ireland	For WBO super-middleweight title.
32	Win	29–3	(United Kingdom) Shaun Cummins	KO	5 (12), 2:40	1995-11-10	(United Kingdom) Moorways Leisure Centre, Derby, England	Retained BBBofC British Middleweight title.
31	Win	28–3	(United Kingdom) Trevor Ambrose	PTS	8	1995-09-02	(United Kingdom) Wembley Stadium, Wembley, London, England	
30	Loss	27–3	(United States) Anthony Ivory	PTS	8	1995-07-22	(United Kingdom) London Arena, Millwall, London, England	
29	Win	27–2	(United Kingdom) Carlo Colarusso	TKO	7 (12), 2:26	1995-03-03	(United Kingdom) York Hall, Bethnal Green, London, England	Retained BBBofC British Middleweight title.
28	Win	26–2	(United Kingdom) Steve Goodwin	TKO	3 (10), 0:45	1995-02-10	(United Kingdom) Aston Villa Leisure Centre, Birmingham, England	
27	Win	25–2	(United Kingdom) Antonio Fernandez	TKO	9 (12)	1994-11-29	(United Kingdom) Chase Leisure Centre, Cannock, England	Retained BBBofC British Middleweight title.
26	Win	24–2	(United Kingdom) Colin Pitters	KO	2 (8), 0:26	1994-10-29	(United Kingdom) Chase Leisure Centre, Cannock, England	
25	Loss	23–2	(Italy) Agostino Cardamone	TKO	7 (12)	1994-07-20	National Exhibition Centre, Solofra, Italy	For EBU European Middleweight title.
24	Win	23–1	(United States) Walid Underwood	PTS	10	1994-03-16	(United Kingdom) National Exhibition Centre, Birmingham, England	
23	Win	22–1	(United Kingdom) Andy Flute	RTD	7 (12), 3:00	1994-01-26	(United Kingdom) Aston Villa Leisure Centre, Birmingham, England	Retained BBBofC British Middleweight title.
22	Win	21–1	(United Kingdom) Frank Grant	TKO	7 (12)	1993-11-10	(United Kingdom) York Hall, Bethnal Green, London, England	Won BBBofC British Middleweight title.
21	Win	20–1	(United Kingdom) Paul Busby	PTS	10	1993-03-16	(United Kingdom) Civic Hall, Wolverhampton, England	
20	Win	19–1	(United Kingdom) Graham Burton	KO	4 (8)	1993-01-20	(United Kingdom) Civic Hall, Wolverhampton, England	
19	Win	18–1	(United Kingdom) Karl Barwise	TKO	6 (8)	1992-12-04	(United Kingdom) Racquet Centre, Telford, England	
18	Win	17–1	(United Kingdom) Horace Fleary	PTS	8	1992-11-02	(United Kingdom) Civic Hall, Wolverhampton, England	
17	Win	16–1	(United Kingdom) Ernie Loveridge	TKO	4 (6)	1992-10-01	(United Kingdom) Telford Ice Rink, Telford, England	
16	Win	15–1	(United Kingdom) Paul Murray	KO	3 (8), 1:37	1992-03-26	(United Kingdom) Telford Ice Rink, Telford, England	
15	Win	14–1	(United Kingdom) Colin Pitters	TKO	3 (8), 0:48	1991-11-21	(United Kingdom) Meadowside Leisure Centre, Burton upon Trent, England	
14	Win	13–1	(United Kingdom) Paul Wesley	PTS	8	1991-10-03	(United Kingdom) Meadowside Leisure Centre, Burton upon Trent, England	
13	Win	12–1	(United Kingdom) Paul Smith	TKO	3 (8), 2:30	1991-08-29	(United Kingdom) Town Hall, Oakengates, England	
12	Loss	11–1	(United Kingdom) Paul Wesley	TKO	1 (8)	1991-07-04	(United Kingdom) Leisure Centre, Alfreton, England	
11	Win	11–0	(United Kingdom) Winston Wray	TKO	1 (8)	1991-04-12	(United Kingdom) Baths, Willenhall, England	
10	Win	10–0	(United Kingdom) Tony Booth	PTS	6	1991-03-28	(United Kingdom) Leisure Centre, Alfreton, England	
9	Win	9–0	(United Kingdom) Jimmy Thornton	TKO	1 (8)	1991-02-13	(United Kingdom) Grand Hall, Wembley, London, England	
8	Win	8–0	(United Kingdom) Seamus Casey	TKO	4 (8)	1991-01-17	(United Kingdom) Leisure Centre, Alfreton, England	
7	Win	7–0	(United Kingdom) Chris Richards	TKO	2 (6)	1990-12-13	(United Kingdom) Leisure Centre, Dewsbury, England	
6	Win	6–0	(United Kingdom) Nigel Moore	KO	1 (6), 1:52	1990-10-10	(United Kingdom) Royal Albert Hall, South Kensington, London, England	
5	Win	5–0	(United Kingdom) Anthony Campbell	TKO	2 (6), 1:27	1990-09-13	(United Kingdom) Watford Town Hall, Watford, England	
4	Win	4–0	(Saint Lucia) William Pronzola	TKO	3 (6)	1990-05-09	(United Kingdom) Grand Hall, Wembley, London, England	
3	Win	3–0	(United Kingdom) Jimmy McDonagh	TKO	2 (6), 0:38	1990-03-27	(United Kingdom) Grosvenor House Hotel, Mayfair, London, England	
2	Win	2–0	(United Kingdom) Colin Ford	RTD	3 (6)	1990-01-10	(United Kingdom) Royal Albert Hall, South Kensington, London, England	
1	Win	1–0	(United Kingdom) Spencer Alton	TKO	4 (6), 1:16	1989-11-08	(United Kingdom) Grand Hall, Wembley, London, England	Professional debut
