= Mariano Natalio Carrera =

Argentine boxer

Personal information
- Nickname: Adrenalina
- Born: July 22, 1980 (age 45) San Isidro, Buenos Aires, Argentina
- Height: 6 ft 0 in (183 cm)
- Weight: Middleweight

Boxing career
- Stance: Orthodox

Boxing record
- Total fights: 39
- Wins: 32
- Win by KO: 23
- Losses: 6
- No contests: 1

Mariano Natalio Carrera (born July 22, 1980) is an Argentine boxer, who represented his native country at the 2000 Summer Olympics.

== Professional career ==
Carrera began his pro career in 2001 and captured the WBA middleweight title by knocking out Javier Castillejo in 2006. Carrera tested positive for an illegal substance following the win over Castillejo, and the bout's result was officially overturned to a no-contest. His urine test was confirmed to have tested positive for the steroid Clenbuterol. He was stripped of the title, carrera is not officially recognized as a former world champion by the WBA. Castillejo and Carrera met in a rematch in 2007 and Castillejo knocked out Carrera in six rounds.

== Professional boxing record ==
| 39 fights | 32 wins | 6 losses |
|---|---|---|
| By knockout | 23 | 3 |
| By decision | 8 | 3 |
| By disqualification | 1 | 0 |
| No contests | 1 | |

| No. | Result | Record | Opponent | Type | Round, time | Date | Location | Notes |
|---|---|---|---|---|---|---|---|---|
| 39 | Loss | 32–6 (1) | Noé González Alcoba | KO | 4 (10) | 2009-08-20 | Estadio Luna Park, Buenos Aires, Argentina | |
| 38 | Win | 32–5 (1) | Jose Hilton Dos Santos | TKO | 3 (10) | 2008-09-27 | Estadio Municipal, Jovita, Argentina | |
| 37 | Loss | 31–5 (1) | Javier Castillejo | KO | 6 (12) | 2007-11-13 | Hohenstaufenhalle, Göppingen, Germany | |
| 36 | Win | 31–4 (1) | Josival Lima Teixeira | TKO | 1 (10) | 2007-08-11 | Club Atlético Adelante, Reconquista, Argentina | Won vacant WBA Fedelatin middleweight title |
| 35 | Win | 30–4 (1) | Oney Valdez | TKO | 4 (8) | 2007-05-12 | Pharaoh's Casino, Managua, Nicaragua | |
| 34 | NC | 29–4 (1) | Javier Castillejo | NC | 11 (12) | 2006-12-02 | Estrel Convention Center, Berlin, Germany | WBA (Regular) middleweight title at stake; Originally a TKO win for Carrera, later ruled an NC after he failed a drug test |
| 33 | Win | 29–4 | Luis Daniel Parada | KO | 10 (10) | 2006-07-25 | Club Atlético San Miguel, San Miguel, Argentina | |
| 32 | Win | 28–4 | Gustavo Javier Kapusi | DQ | 5 (10) | 2006-01-21 | Club Estadio Master, Gregorio de Laferrère, Argentina | |
| 31 | Win | 27–4 | Paulo Alejandro Sanchez | TKO | 5 (12) | 2005-08-27 | Club Glorias, Tigre, Argentina | Retained South American middleweight title |
| 30 | Loss | 26–4 | Paulo Alejandro Sanchez | UD | 10 (10) | 2005-06-11 | Estadio Pedro Estremador, Bariloche, Argentina | |
| 29 | Win | 26–3 | Ruben Eduardo Acosta | UD | 10 (10) | 2005-05-20 | Newell's Old Boys, Rosario, Argentina | Won vacant WBA Fedelatin middleweight title |
| 28 | Win | 25–3 | Luis Daniel Parada | UD | 10 (10) | 2005-02-12 | Club Caza y Pesca, Villa Carlos Paz, Argentina | |
| 27 | Win | 24–3 | Hugo Sclarandi | UD | 6 (6) | 2004-12-10 | General Paz Juniors, Córdoba, Argentina | |
| 26 | Win | 23–3 | Gustavo Javier Kapusi | UD | 10 (10) | 2004-11-27 | Estadio F.A.B., Buenos Aires, Argentina | |
| 25 | Win | 22–3 | Jorge Sclarandi | KO | 10 (12) | 2004-09-11 | Polideportivo Carlos Cerutti, Córdoba, Argentina | Won South American middleweight title |
| 24 | Win | 21–3 | Héctor Javier Velazco | TKO | 10 (12) | 2004-06-19 | Estadio Luna Park, Buenos Aires, Argentina | Won vacant WBO Inter-Continental middleweight title |
| 23 | Win | 20–3 | Juan Italo Meza | TKO | 3 (12) | 2004-02-28 | Club Atletico, Mar del Plata, Argentina | Retained WBO Latino middleweight title |
| 22 | Win | 19–3 | Enrique Campos | TKO | 2 (8) | 2003-12-20 | Ferro Carril Oeste, Buenos Aires, Argentina | |
| 21 | Win | 18–3 | Cristian Oscar Zanabria | RTD | 7 (10) | 2003-10-18 | Estadio F.A.B., Buenos Aires, Argentina | Retained Argentine middleweight title |
| 20 | Win | 17–3 | Juan Italo Meza | UD | 10 (10) | 2003-09-19 | Ex Salta Club, Salta, Argentina | |
| 19 | Win | 16–3 | Miguel Angel Arroyo | SD | 10 (10) | 2003-07-25 | Salta Club, Salta, Argentina | |
| 18 | Win | 15–3 | Javier Alberto Mamani | TKO | 8 (12) | 2003-06-07 | Estadio Luna Park, Buenos Aires, Argentina | Won vacant WBO Latino middleweight title |
| 17 | Win | 14–3 | Ramon Arturo Britez | TKO | 6 (10) | 2003-05-10 | Estadio Luna Park, Buenos Aires, Argentina | Won Argentine middleweight title |
| 16 | Loss | 13–3 | Orlando Javier Acuna | SD | 10 (10) | 2003-03-29 | Estadio F.A.B., Buenos Aires, Argentina | |
| 15 | Win | 13–2 | Juan Carlos Villagra | KO | 7 (8) | 2003-01-24 | Polideportivo Islas Malvinas, Mar del Plata, Argentina | |
| 14 | Win | 12–2 | Freddy Blanco Castello | TKO | 2 (8) | 2002-12-06 | Hotel Cordoba Plaza, Córdoba, Argentina | |
| 13 | Win | 11–2 | Nestor Fabian Casanova | KO | 2 (6) | 2002-07-13 | Estadio Luna Park, Buenos Aires, Argentina | |
| 12 | Win | 10–2 | Hugo Sclarandi | UD | 10 (10) | 2002-06-15 | Estadio F.A.B., Buenos Aires, Argentina | |
| 11 | Win | 9–2 | Cristian Oscar Zanabria | TKO | 10 (10) | 2002-04-13 | Estadio F.A.B., Buenos Aires, Argentina | |
| 10 | Win | 8–2 | Ignacio Ramon Caceres | TKO | 2 (6) | 2002-03-09 | Estadio F.A.B., Buenos Aires, Argentina | |
| 9 | Loss | 7–2 | Marcos Silvano Diaz | KO | 2 (8) | 2001-11-24 | Estadio F.A.B., Buenos Aires, Argentina | |
| 8 | Win | 7–1 | Gabriel Leonidas Leiva | KO | 1 (4) | 2001-10-13 | Estadio F.A.B., Buenos Aires, Argentina | |
| 7 | Win | 6–1 | Carlos Damian Barrera | TKO | 1 (4) | 2001-09-15 | Estadio F.A.B., Buenos Aires, Argentina | |
| 6 | Loss | 5–1 | Marcos Silvano Diaz | SD | 4 (4) | 2001-08-04 | Estadio F.A.B., Buenos Aires, Argentina | |
| 5 | Win | 5–0 | Christian Walter Ponce | KO | 1 (4) | 2001-07-13 | Laboulaye, Argentina | |
| 4 | Win | 4–0 | Daniel Carranza | KO | 3 (4) | 2001-07-06 | Alejandro, Argentina | |
| 3 | Win | 3–0 | Sixto Proterio Ponce | DQ | 1 (4) | 2001-06-30 | Club Rivadavia, Necochea, Argentina | |
| 2 | Win | 1–1 | Dario Antonio Gerez | KO | 1 (4) | 2001-05-19 | Club Bell, Bell Ville, Argentina | |
| 1 | Win | 1–0 | Dario Antonio Gerez | TKO | 3 (4) | 2001-05-04 | Estadio San Lorenzo, La Rioja, Argentina | |

Sporting positions
Regional boxing titles
| Preceded by Ramon Arturo Britez | Argentine middleweight champion May 10, 2003 – 2003; Vacated | Vacant Title next held by Francisco Antonio Mora |
| Vacant Title last held by Alejandro Berrio | WBO Latino middleweight champion June 7, 2003 – 2003; Vacated | Vacant Title next held by Epifanio Mendoza |
| Vacant Title last held by Epifanio Mendoza | WBO Latino middleweight champion February 28, 2004 – 2004; Vacated | Vacant Title next held by Edison Miranda |
| Vacant Title last held by Felix Sturm | WBO Inter-Continental middleweight champion June 19, 2004 – 2004; Vacated | Vacant Title next held by Felix Sturm |
| Preceded by Jorge Sclarandi | South American middleweight champion September 11, 2004 – 2006; Vacated | Vacant Title next held by Oscar Daniel Veliz |
| Vacant Title last held by Francisco Antonio Mora | WBA Fedelatin middleweight champion May 20, 2005 – 2005; Vacated | Vacant Title next held by Noé González Alcoba |
| Vacant Title last held by Noé González Alcoba | WBA Fedelatin middleweight champion August 11, 2007 – 2007; Vacated | Vacant Title next held by Daniel Edouard |
