= András Gálfi =

Hungarian boxer (born 1973)

Personal information
- Nickname: Gatto
- Nationality: (Hungary) Hungarian
- Born: András Gálfi; January 15, 1973 (age 53) Budapest, Hungary
- Height: 5 ft 9.5 in (1.77 m)
- Weight: Middleweight

Boxing career
- Reach: 70 in (180 cm)
- Stance: Orthodox

Boxing record
- Total fights: 53
- Wins: 42
- Win by KO: 26
- Losses: 8
- Draws: 3

András Gálfi (born January 15, 1973) is a Hungarian middleweight boxer. He is a former Hungarian, WBC International and WBO Inter-Continental middleweight champion.

== Professional boxing record ==
53 fights	42 wins	8 losses
By knockout	26	2
By decision	16	6
Draws	3	

No.	Result	Record	Opponent	Type	Round, time	Date	Location	Notes
53	Loss	42–8–3	Héctor Javier Velazco	RTD	8 (12), 0:01	10 May 2003	Estadio Luna Park, Buenos Aires, Argentina	For vacant WBO interim middleweight title
52	Win	42–7–3	Alexandru Manea	UD	8	14 Mar 2003	Pólus Center, Budapest, Hungary	
51	Win	41–7–3	Anthony van Nierek	UD	12	13 Sep 2002	Pólus Center, Budapest, Hungary	Won vacant WBO Inter-Continental middleweight title
50	Win	40–7–3	Zdeněk Zubko	TKO	3 (6)	8 Feb 2002	Imperial Gym, Budapest, Hungary	
49	Win	39–7–3	Nenad Stanković	TKO	2 (8)	20 Oct 2001	Lovarda, Debrecen, Hungary	
48	Win	38–7–3	Marius Polac	TKO	4 (6)	8 Jun 2001	Imperial Gym, Budapest, Hungary	
47	Win	37–7–3	Habib Ben Salah	UD	6	17 Mar 2001	FTC Handball-Hall, Budapest, Hungary	
46	Win	36–7–3	František Borov	TKO	5 (6)	9 Feb 2001	Pápa, Veszprém County, Hungary	
45	Win	35–7–3	Florin Constandache Ilie	PTS	8	27 Oct 2000	Budapest, Pest County, Hungary	
44	Win	34–7–3	Ramdane Kaouane	KO	3 (4)	7 Oct 2000	Estrel Convention Center, Berlin, Germany	
43	Win	33–7–3	Andrzej Kowalski	PTS	4	23 Jun 2000	FTC Stadium, Budapest, Hungary	
42	Win	32–7–3	Pierre Moreno	PTS	12	31 Mar 2000	Pápa, Veszprém County, Hungary	Won vacant WBO Inter-Continental middleweight title
41	Win	31–7–3	Viktor Fesechko	PTS	12	26 Nov 1999	City Sporthall, Pápa, Hungary	Won vacant WBU Inter-Continental middleweight title
40	Win	30–7–3	Marius Polac	KO	2 (8)	27 Aug 1999	Szekszárd, Tolna County, Hungary	
39	Win	29–7–3	Gustáv Liptak	TKO	3 (8)	4 Jun 1999	Szekszárd, Tolna County, Hungary	
38	Loss	28–7–3	Mohamed Hissani	MD	8	13 Apr 1999	Épernay, Marne, France	
37	Loss	28–6–3	Rashid Matumla	KO	4 (12), 2:50	19 Dec 1998	Diamond Jubilee Hall, Dar es Salaam, Tanzania	For vacant WBU super welterweight title
36	Loss	28–5–3	Glenn Catley	UD	12	24 Oct 1998	Whitchurch Sports Centre, Bristol, England	For vacant WBO Inter-Continental super middleweight title
35	Win	28–4–3	Philippe Cazeaux	TKO	6 (8)	13 Oct 1998	Guilherand-Granges, Ardèche, France	
34	Win	27–4–3	Ferousi Ilunga	TKO	3 (8)	30 Aug 1998	Budapest, Pest County, Hungary	
33	Loss	26–4–3	Orlando Wiet	PTS	10	2 Jun 1998	Saverne, Bas-Rhin, France	
32	Win	26–3–3	Maxime Larine	PTS	8	7 Apr 1998	Épernay, Marne, France	
31	Win	25–3–3	Marino Monteyne	PTS	6	21 Feb 1998	Busapest, Pest County, Hungary	
30	Loss	24–3–3	Howard Clarke	UD	8	5 Nov 1997	Santa Cruz de Tenerife, Canary Islands, Spain	
29	Loss	24–2–3	Morrade Hakkar	MD	12	23 Sep 1997	Guilherand-Granges, Ardèche	Lost WBC International middleweight title
28	Win	24–1–3	Patrick Gosselin	TKO	7 (8)	24 Jun 1997	Pont-Audemer, Eure, France	
27	Win	23–1–3	Glenn Catley	TKO	7 (12), 2:49	5 Jun 1997	Whitchurch Sports Centre, Bristol, England	Won WBC International middleweight title
26	Win	22–1–3	Djaafar Filali	PTS	8	4 Feb 1997	Saverne, Bas-Rhin, France	
25	Win	21–1–3	Belhem Beldjenna	TD	5 (8)	19 Nov 1996	Chenôve, Côte-d'Or, France	
24	Win	20–1–3	János Santa	TKO	3 (6)	22 Sep 1996	Nyíregyháza, Szabolcs-Szatmár-Bereg County, Hungary	
23	Loss	19–1–3	Imre Bacskai	PTS	8	7 Jul 1996	Budapest, Pest County, Hungary	
22	Draw	19–0–3	Léon Cessiron	PTS	8	21 May 1996	Épernay, Marne, France	
21	Win	19–0–2	Hubert Gobrait	TKO	2 (8)	8 Mar 1996	French Polynesia, France	
20	Win	18–0–2	Patrice Cord'Homme	PTS	8	30 Jan 1996	Lille, Nord, France	
19	Win	17–0–2	Marius Adelaide	PTS	8	15 Dec 1995	Budapest, Pest County, Hungary	
18	Win	16–0–2	César Basualdo	TKO	4 (10)	28 Oct 1995	Fontenay-sous-Bois, Val-de-Marne, France	
17	Win	15–0–2	Eric Rhinehart	TKO	4 (8)	26 Aug 1995	Budapest, Pest County, Hungary	
16	Win	14–0–2	Antonio Campbell	TKO	6 (8)	25 Jun 1995	Budapest, Pest County, Hungary	
15	Win	13–0–2	Károly Kovács	TKO	2 (6)	5 May 1995	Budapest, Pest County, Hungary	
14	Win	12–0–2	József Soltán Nagy	TKO	12 (12)	24 Feb 1995	Szekszárd, Tolna County, Hungary	Retained Hungarian middleweight title
13	Draw	11–0–2	Hassan Mokhtar	PTS	8	18 Dec 1994	Vilvoorde, Flemish Brabant, Belgium	
12	Win	11–0–1	Tibor Horváth	TKO	3 (6)	18 Nov 1994	Balassagyarmat, Nógrád County, Hungary	
11	Win	10–0–1	Péter Fábián	TKO	3 (4)	19 Aug 1994	Tatabánya, Komárom-Esztergom County, Hungary	
10	Win	9–0–1	Pietro Scarito	KO	2 (10)	27 May 1994	Hotel Hilton, Budapest, Hungary	Won vacant Hungarian middleweight title
9	Win	8–0–1	Gábor Gresina	TKO	2 (8)	28 Mar 1994	Budapest, Pest County, Hungary	
8	Win	7–0–1	Joakim Gustavsson	TKO	3 (4)	27 Feb 1994	Budapest, Pest County, Hungary	
7	Win	6–0–1	Csaba Simon	TKO	2 (6)	15 Jan 1994	Budapest, Pest County, Hungary	
6	Win	5–0–1	Aladár Horváth	TKO	3 (6)	29 Aug 1993	Budapest, Pest County, Hungary	
5	Win	4–0–1	Aladár Horváth	TKO	1 (8)	21 Jul 1993	Budapest, Pest County, Hungary	
4	Win	3–0–1	Csaba Oláh	PTS	8	2 Jul 1993	Budapest, Pest County, Hungary	
3	Win	2–0–1	Lansana Diallo	PTS	6	10 May 1993	Budapest, Pest County, Hungary	
2	Draw	1–0–1	Ivano Biagi	PTS	6	26 Mar 1993	Sinalunga, Tuscany, Italy	
1	Win	1–0	Miroslav Cuj	PTS	6	11 Mar 1993	Szekszárd, Tolna County, Hungary	

Achievements
Preceded by Glenn Catley	WBC International Middleweight Champion; June 5, 1997 - October 25, 1997	Succeeded by Morrade Hakkar
Vacant Title last held by Hussain Osman	WBO Inter-Continental Middleweight Champion; October 13, 2002 - May 10, 2003; Lost bid for interim world title	Succeeded by Felix Sturm
