= Héctor Javier Velazco =

Argentine boxer (born 1973)

Héctor Velazco
Personal information
- Nickname: "El Artillero" (The Gunner)
- Born: Héctor Javier Velazco; 20 May 1973 (age 53) Avellaneda, Argentina
- Height: 179 cm (5 ft 10 in)
- Weight: Middleweight; Super middleweight

Boxing career
- Stance: Orthodox

Boxing record
- Total fights: 47
- Wins: 37
- Win by KO: 16
- Losses: 9
- Draws: 1

Héctor Javier Velazco (20 May 1973, Avellaneda) is an Argentine boxer.

== Professional career ==
Known as "El Artillero", Velazco turned pro in 1996 and compiled a record of 28-1-1 in his first 31 fights before he defeated András Gálfi on 3 March 2003 for the vacant WBO interim middleweight title. He was elevated to full champion when original titleholder Harry Simon failed to make his mandatory defense due to injuries suffered in a car accident. He would go on to lose the belt in his first defense to Felix Sturm in what would be his first fight outside of his native Argentina. Velazco had a record of 8–6 in his final 14 fights before deciding to retire from the sport in 2010.

== Professional boxing record ==
47 fights	37 wins	9 losses
By knockout	16	5
By decision	19	3
By disqualification	2	1
Draws	1	

No	Result	Record	Opponent	Type	Round, time	Date	Location	Notes
47	Loss	37–9-1	(Ghana) Braimah Kamoko	TKO	10 (12)	31 Jul 2010	Ohene Djan Sports Stadium, Accra, Ghana	
46	Loss	37–8-1	(Venezuela) Gusmyr Perdomo	TKO	2 (11)	3 Jul 2008	Estadio Luna Park, Buenos Aires, Argentina	For vacant WBA Fedelatin super middleweight title
45	Win	37–7-1	(Argentina) Martin David Islas	UD	6	15 May 2008	Sociedad Española, San Luis, Argentina	
44	Win	36–7-1	(Argentina) Martin David Islas	UD	10	5 Jan 2008	Polideportivo Municipal, Villa Gesell, Argentina	
43	Loss	35–7–1	(Denmark) Mads Larsen	UD	8	23 Apr 2007	Stadthalle, Zwickau, Germany	
42	Loss	35–6–1	(Germany) Jürgen Brähmer	UD	12	19 May 2007	Color Line Arena, Altona, Germany	For vacant WBO Inter-Continental super middleweight title
41	Win	35-5-1	(Argentina) Martin David Islas	KO	2 (6)	20 Jan 2007	Monte Hermoso, Argentina	
40	Win	34-5-1	(Argentina) Juan Italo Meza	UD	8	2 Sep 2006	Shopping Alas, Villa Gesell, Argentina	
39	Win	33-5-1	(Argentina) Walter Lucio Martinez	UD	6	16 Dec 2005	Polideportivo Municipal, Villa Gesell, Argentina	
38	Win	32-5-1	(Argentina) Hugo Ricardo Rodriguez	KO	3 (10)	12 Nov 2005	Ce.De.M. N° 1, Caseros, Argentina	
37	Loss	31-5-1	(Germany) Arthur Abraham	KO	5 (12)	23 Apr 2005	Arena Westfalenhalle, Dortmund, Germany	For WBA Inter-Continental middleweight title
36	Win	31-4-1	(Argentina) Luis Daniel Parada	UD	8	19 Mar 2005	Club Independiente, Bahia Blanca, Argentina	
35	Loss	30-4-1	(Argentina) Mariano Natalio Carrera	TKO	10 (12)	19 Jun 2004	Estadio Luna Park, Buenos Aires, Argentina	
34	Win	30-3-1	(Argentina) Ramon Arturo Britez	UD	8	6 Mar 2004	Estadio Luna Park, Buenos Aires, Argentina	
33	Loss	29-3-1	(Germany) Felix Sturm	SD	12	13 Sep 2003	Estrel Convention Center, Berlin-Neukölln, Germany	Lost WBO middleweight title
32	Win	29-2-1	(Hungary) András Gálfi	RTD	8 (12)	10 May 2003	Estadio Luna Park, Buenos Aires, Argentina	Won vacant WBO interim middleweight title
31	Win	28-2-1	(Argentina) Lorenzo Marquez	KO	2 (8)	5 Oct 2002	Ce.De.M. N° 2, Caseros, Argentina	
30	Win	27-2-1	(Argentina) Leonardo Javier Gonzalez	RTD	8 (12)	25 May 2002	Villa Gesell, Argentina	
29	Win	26-2-1	(Argentina) Juan Italo Meza	TKO	7 (8)	19 Jan 2002	Estadio F.A.B., Buenos Aires, Argentina	
28	Win	25-2-1	(Argentina) Hugo Daniel Sclarandi	UD	12	21 Jul 2001	Polideportivo Municipal, Pinamar, Argentina	
27	Win	24-2-1	(Brazil) Rogerio Cacciatore	KO	8 (12)	21 Apr 2001	Ex Expreso Castellano, Villa Gesell, Argentina	
26	Win	23-2-1	(Argentina) Jose Luis Loyola	UD	8	8 Dec 2000	Villa Gesell, Argentina	
25	Win	22-2-1	(Argentina) Hugo Daniel Sclarandi	PTS	8	13 Oct 2000	Villa Gesell, Argentina	
24	Win	21-2-1	(Argentina) Ramon Arturo Britez	UD	12	21 Jul 2000	Villa Gesell, Argentina	
23	Win	20-2-1	(Argentina) Nestor Jesus Gil	KO	2 (8)	26 May 2000	Pinamar, Argentina	
22	Win	19-2-1	(Argentina) Juan Carlos Lettieri	PTS	6	21 Apr 2000	Club Social y Deportivo Mar de Ajó, Argentina	
21	Win	18-2-1	(Argentina) Mario Javier Moreno	UD	8	25 Feb 2000	Estadio Polideportivo, Pinamar, Argentina	
20	Draw	17-2-1	(Argentina) Cristian Oscar Zanabria	PTS	8	7 Dec 1999	Dolores, Argentina	
19	Win	17-2	(Argentina) Marcelo Hugo Pablo Lamadrid	PTS	8	15 Oct 1999	Pinamar, Argentina	
18	Win	16-2	(Argentina) Argentino Raul Lopez	TKO	3 (8)	12 Jun 1999	Pinamar, Argentina	
17	Win	15-2	(Brazil) Jose Laercio Bezerra de Lima	PTS	8	18 Dec 1998	Villa Gesell, Argentina	
16	Loss	14-2	(Argentina) Ariel Patricio Arrieta	KO	4 (10)	29 Aug 1998	Buenos Aires, Argentina	
15	Win	14-1	(Argentina) Jose Luis Saldivia	PTS	8	16 May 1998	Buenos Aires, Argentina	
14	Win	13-1	(Argentina) Fernando Roberto Vera	DQ	5 (8)	4 Apr 1998	Buenos Aires, Argentina	
13	Win	12-1	(Argentina) Javier Alberto Lescano	PTS	8	20 Dec 1997	Estudios Canal 9 TV, Buenos Aires, Argentina	
12	Win	11-1	(Argentina) Antonio de la Cruz Perez	DQ	4 (8)	22 Nov 1997	Villa Gesell, Argentina	
11	Win	10-1	(Argentina) Ariel Patricio Arrieta	RTD	5 (6)	8 Nov 1997	Estudios Canal 9 TV, Buenos Aires, Argentina	
10	Win	9-1	(Argentina) Raul Norberto Guichapani	UD	8	27 Sep 1997	Buenos Aires, Argentina	
9	Win	8-1	(Argentina) Carlos Alberto Rene More	RTD	3 (8)	19 Jul 1997	Villa Gesell, Argentina	
8	Win	7-1	(Argentina) Gustavo Fabian Maceda	PTS	8	28 Jun 1997	Buenos Aires, Argentina	
7	Win	6-1	(Argentina) Fernando Roberto Vera	TKO	4 (6)	14 Jun 1997	Buenos Aires, Argentina	
6	Win	5-1	(Argentina) Carlos Marcelo Romero	TKO	3 (10)	3 May 1997	Buenos Aires, Argentina	
5	Win	4-1	(Argentina) Gustavo Fabian Maceda	PTS	6	29 Mar 1997-	Estudios Canal 9 TV, Buenos Aires, Argentina	
4	Loss	3-1	(Argentina) Jorge Javier Arias	DQ	1 (8)	1 Feb 1997	Buenos Aires, Argentina	
3	Win	3-0	(Argentina) Hector Eduardo Villarreal	KO	4 (6)	23 Nov 1996	Villa Gesell, Argentina	
2	Win	2-0	(Argentina) Sandro Walter Barrionuevo	TKO	4 (6)	12 Oct 1996	Villa Gesell, Argentina	
1	Win	1-0	(Argentina) Jose Maria Escobar	KO	3 (6)	7 Sep 1996	Villa Gesell, Argentina	

== See also ==
- List of middleweight boxing champions

Achievements
Vacant Title last held by Harry Simon	WBO middleweight champion Interim title 10 May 2003 – 8 July 2003; Promoted	Vacant Title next held by Hassan N'Dam N'Jikam
Preceded by Harry Simon; Stripped	WBO middleweight champion 8 July 2003 – 13 September 2003	Succeeded by Felix Sturm
