= Frank Grant (boxer) =

British former boxer (born 1965)

Personal information
- Nationality: British
- Born: 22 May 1965 (age 61) Bradford, England
- Height: 5 ft 11 in (1.80 m)
- Weight: Middleweight

Boxing career
- Stance: Southpaw

Boxing record
- Total fights: 26
- Wins: 22
- Win by KO: 17
- Losses: 4
- Draws: 0

Frank Grant (born 22 May 1965) is a British former boxer who was British middleweight champion between 1992 and 1993.

== Career ==
Born and raised in Bradford, Grant trained out of Phil Martin's Champs Camp gym in Moss Side, Manchester, and made his professional debut in October 1986, when he was stopped by Lincoln Pennant in the first round. He won 19 of his first 22 fights, including a win over Shaun Cummins and defeat to Kid Milo, before getting a shot at the British title in September 1992 at Elland Road against Herol Graham, who was making his fourth defence. Grant stopped Graham in the ninth round to take the title, inflicting Graham's only professional defeat to another British boxer. He made a successful defence in March 1993 against John Ashton, but lost the title in November that year to Neville Brown. He subsequently retired from boxing and ran a pub.

In 1996 Grant, who had spent time in prison as a teenager, was convicted of assault against his wife, and in August 2001 he was arrested after attacking a doorman who he claimed had previously assaulted him, receiving a four-year prison sentence in July 2002. In 2003 he was allowed out of prison twice a week to coach young boxers at Goole Boxing Club.
