= Shaun Cummins =

British boxer (1968–2012)

Personal information
- Nickname: The Guv'nor
- Nationality: British
- Born: 8 February 1968 Leicester, England
- Died: September 2012 (aged 44) Leicester, England
- Height: 6 ft 1 in (1.85 m)
- Weight: Super welterweight, middleweight

Boxing career
- Reach: 78 in (200 cm)
- Stance: Orthodox

Boxing record
- Total fights: 29
- Wins: 22
- Win by KO: 14
- Losses: 6
- Draws: 1

Shaun Cummins (8 February 1968 – September 2012) was a British boxer who won the WBA Inter-Continental super welterweight title in 1992 and went on to fight for the British and European middleweight titles. He was paralysed by a motorcycle accident in 2004 and was murdered by his carer Thomas Dunkley eight years later.

== Career ==
Born in Leicester, Shaun Cummins boxed as an amateur out of Belgrave Amateur Boxing Club and began his professional career in 1986 with a points victory over Michael Justin at Loughborough Town Hall. He won his next five fights before suffering his first defeat October 1988 to Frank Grant. In April 1990 he faced Wally Swift Jr for the vacant BBBofC Midlands Area super welterweight title, losing by only half a point. Unbeaten in his next seven fights, in November 1992 he challenged Steve Foster for the WBA Inter-Continental super welterweight title, taking the title on points. He successfully defended the title in April 1993 against Mickey Hughes.

In November 1994 he fought Agostino Cardamone for the EBU European middleweight title in Sanremo; The fight went the full 12 rounds, but Cardamone took the verdict.

His final fight came in November 1995 when he challenged Neville Brown for the British middleweight title; Brown stopped Cummins in the fifth round.

Cummins was forced to retire from boxing shortly after his clash with Neville Brown, after failing a routine brain scan. After attempting for several years to be allowed to continue boxing he was eventually cleared to fight again in 2001 after obtaining a licence from the Irish Boxing Union, although he never boxed again.

In July 1997, Cummins received a six-month prison sentence for assaulting and racially abusing an Asian doctor who was treating his newborn son for breathing difficulties at Leicester Royal Infirmary.

After retiring from boxing, Cummins went on to become a bodybuilder, debt collector and a bodyguard for pop star Lee Ryan.

Cummins was seriously injured in an accident on the A6 in Birstall in 2004 when his motorcycle was in a collision with a car, and complications from an infected cut on his backside left him paralysed from the chest down and needing assistance from a carer and nurses.

== Death ==
Cummins was found dead at his bungalow in Marriott Road, Leicester, on 12 September 2012; his body had been badly dismembered. His carer Thomas Dunkley was arrested soon afterwards and charged with murder. He was found guilty eight months later and sentenced to life imprisonment with a minimum term of 34 years. It emerged that Dunkley had murdered Cummins and cut his body into ten pieces with a chainsaw, before storing the body parts in freezers at Cummins' home and going on a spending spree using Cummins' credit card and cheque book. During the trial he was accused of taking £15,000 from his trust fund and £11,000 from his bank accounts. Due to the dismemberment of the body, the cause of death could not be determined and the date of death was estimated at "some time on or after Saturday, 1 September" – he was last seen alive on 1 September by a nurse, meaning that he had been dead for up to 11 days before his body was found.
