= Felix Sturm =

Bosnian-German boxer (born 1979)

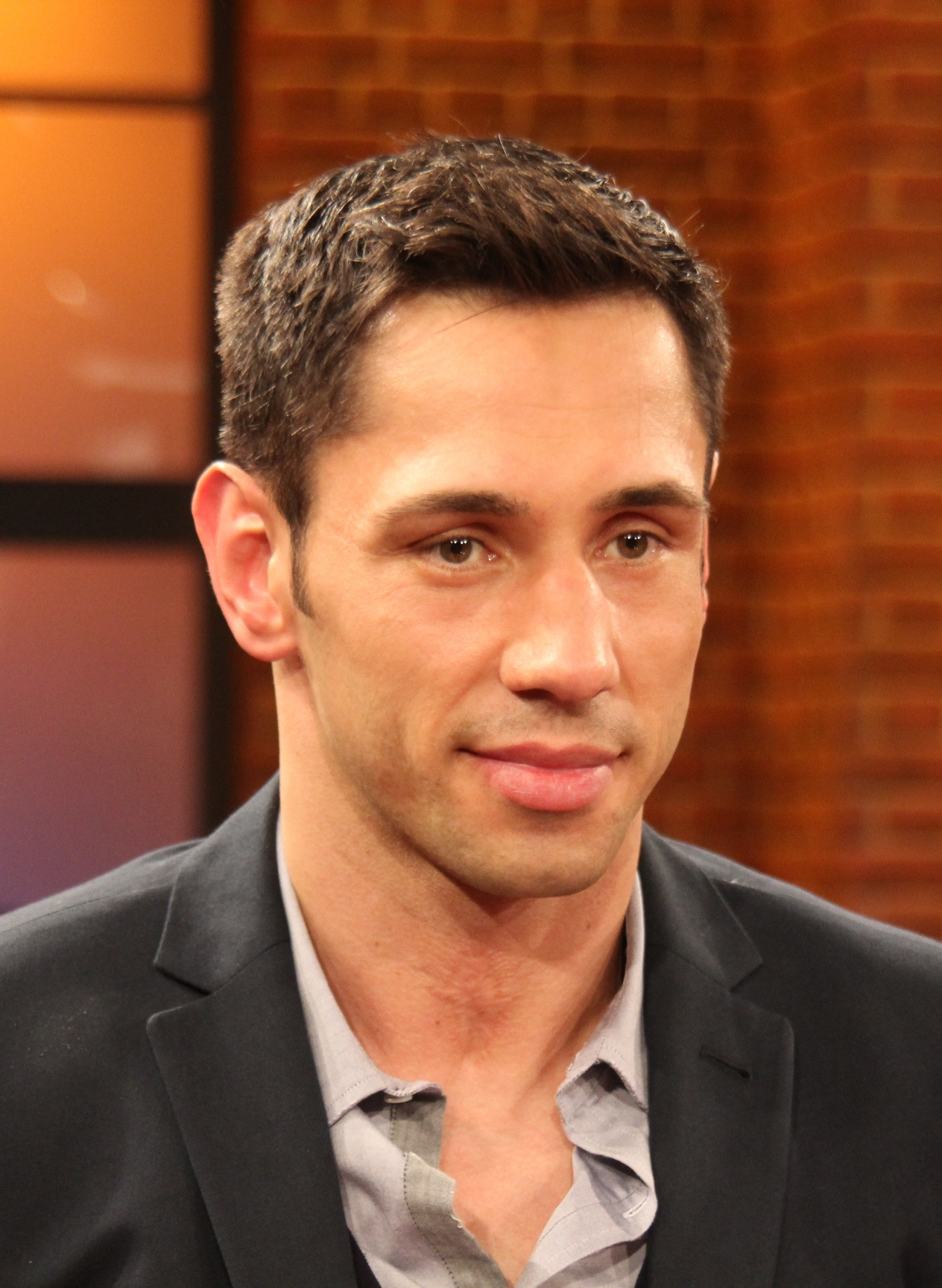
- Sturm in 2012

Personal information
- Nickname: The Fighter
- Nationality: German; Bosnian
- Born: Adnan Ćatić; 31 January 1979 (age 47) Leverkusen, West Germany
- Height: 1.81 m (5 ft 11 1/2 in)
- Weight: Middleweight; Super-middleweight

Boxing career
- Reach: 185 cm (73 in)
- Stance: Orthodox

Boxing record
- Total fights: 56
- Wins: 45
- Win by KO: 20
- Losses: 7
- Draws: 3
- No contests: 1
Medal record
Men's amateur boxing
Representing Germany
European Championships
| Gold medal – first place | 2000 Tampere | Light-middleweight |

Adnan Ćatić (born 31 January 1979), known as Felix Sturm, is a Bosnian professional boxer. He has held multiple world championships in two weight classes, at middleweight and super-middleweight. As an amateur, he won a gold medal at the 2000 European Championships in the light-middleweight division.

== Amateur career ==
=== Highlights ===
- 1997 2nd place at Light Middleweight in German National Championships, losing to Jürgen Brähmer on points
- 1998 German National Light Middleweight champion, defeating Jorg Rosomkiewicz
- 1999 competed at the World Championships in Houston, United States; as a Light Middleweight. Results were:
  - Defeated Andrei Tsurkan (Ukraine) points
  - Lost to Yermakhan Ibraimov (Kazakhstan) points
- 1999 German National Light Middleweight champion, defeating Jorg Rosomkiewicz
- 2000 1st place at Light Middleweight at European Championships in Tampere, Finland. Results were:
  - Defeated Karoly Balzsay (Hungary) points
  - Defeated Miroslaw Nowosada (Poland) points
  - Defeated Dmitri Usagin (Bulgaria) points
  - Defeated Andrei Mishin (Russia) 3-1
- Represented Germany at the 2000 Olympic Games in Sydney, Australia. Results were:
  - Defeated Dilshod Yarbekov (Uzbekistan) points
  - Defeated Richard Rowles (Australia) TKO 3
  - Lost to Jermain Taylor (United States) points

He finished his amateur career with a record of 143 wins and 10 losses.

== Professional career ==
=== Early career ===
On 27 January 2001, Sturm made his debut as a professional boxer facing Antonio Ribeiro from Angola. Six months earlier he had qualified for the Olympic Games in Sydney, but lost his fight to future middleweight champ Jermain Taylor.

After 16 successful matches, Sturm won the WBO Inter-Continental middleweight title on 10 May 2003. On 13 September 2003, he replaced the injured Bert Schenk in a WBO title bout against Argentinian Hectór Javier Velazco and won the match. Sturm defended the title against Rubén Varón Fernández from Spain.

==== Sturm vs. De La Hoya ====
On 5 June 2004 in Las Vegas, Sturm faced Oscar De La Hoya in a defense of his WBO middleweight championship. All three judges scored the fight 115-113 for De La Hoya, while Harold Lederman scored the fight 115-113 for Sturm. Compubox counted Sturm as landing 234 of 541 punches, while counting De La Hoya as landing 188 of 792. Sturm protested the decision with the Nevada Athletic Commission to no avail.

==== WBA champion ====
On 11 March 2006, Sturm defeated Maselino Masoe for the WBA middleweight title by a unanimous decision. Sturm then lost his title against former champion Javier Castillejo via TKO on 15 July 2006 but won it back from Castillejo in a rematch on 28 April 2007 by a twelve round unanimous decision in Oberhausen, which he earned after defeating Gavin Topp by TKO in the sixth round.

Sturm became a three-time world champion after defeating Castillejo in the rematch.

He also fought Randy Griffin twice, drawing with him in their first fight and winning their second fight by unanimous decision.

On 2 November 2008, Sturm retained his WBA middleweight title via unanimous decision (118-110, 118-110 and 119-109) over Sebastian Sylvester. He improved to 31-2, with one draw, while Sylvester fell to 31-3.

On 11 July 2009, he defended his title against Khoren Gevor in Nürburg in 12 rounds.

After over a year of inactivity Sturm came back to defend his WBA title against Giovanni Lorenzo, with the winner becoming the WBA "Super" champion. Sturm defeated Lorenzo by a twelve round unanimous decision with the judges giving a comfortable 117-111 twice and 118-111 on the scorecards.

After defeating top contenders Matthew Macklin and Sebastian Zbik, Sturm lost his WBA title to Australian Daniel Geale. Geale's IBF title was also on the line.

==== IBF champion ====
In 2013, Sturm became Germany's first four-time world champion by defeating Darren Barker in Stuttgart. Barker was in no condition to continue after suffering a serious hip injury. Barker's IBF title was on the line. One month later the Englishman announced his retirement from boxing.

In mid-2014, Sturm lost his title against Sam Soliman via unanimous decision. Soliman won by official scores of 110-118 (twice) and 111–117.

=== Super-middleweight ===
==== WBA (Super) champion ====
In 2016, Sturm defeated Fedor Chudinov by way decision, becoming a two-weight world champion. Later after the fight, the doping samples that were taken from Sturm before the fight were suddenly challenged, however, the sample documents were not complete, as the location, time of arrival was not documented. Due to this inaccuracy, Sturm was not stripped of his titles. He then relocated to Bosnia and Herzegovina.

==== Doping allegations ====
Sturm broke the silence two months later with a post which he shared via Instagram where he complained about being treated unfairly by the doping investigators. Sturm wrote that he was only informed two months after the first doping sample about the results and that he wasn't told why it took longer than usual (two weeks). After engaging a lawyer who requested all the required documents from the investigators he noticed that the last page was missing, "...where is written, when my sample arrived at the laboratory, who received it and who analysed the sample.", it was written in that social media post. He allegedly didn't get an answer after submitting further inquiries and was denied the right to let the b-sample be analysed by another laboratory. Sturm claimed that the WBA refrained from suspending him because of these irregularities.

==== Comeback ====
On 19 December 2020, Sturm had his first fight since February 2016. Sturm dominated opponent Timo Rost throughout the fight and earned a unanimous decision victory, winning wide on all three scorecards. Two of the judges scored the fight 100-90 and one judge scored it 99-91.

== Personal life ==
Sturm was born Adnan Ćatić in Leverkusen, Germany. His parents, Ćamil and Zahida, are ethnic Bosniaks who hail from Blagaj, Bosnia and Herzegovina, having emigrated to Germany in the 1970s. For marketing reasons, Ćatić started as a professional boxer under the stage name Felix Sturm. In addition to German citizenship, he also holds a Bosnian diplomatic passport.

In May 2020, Sturm was jailed for tax evasion and drug use.

== Professional boxing record ==
| 56 fights | 45 wins | 7 losses |
|---|---|---|
| By knockout | 20 | 1 |
| By decision | 25 | 6 |
| Draws | 3 | |
| No contests | 1 | |

| No. | Result | Record | Opponent | Type | Round, time | Date | Location | Notes |
|---|---|---|---|---|---|---|---|---|
| 56 | Loss | 45–7–3 (1) | Granit Stein | SD | 10 | 11 Jul 2026 | Porsche Arena, Stuttgart, Baden-Württemberg, Germany | |
| 55 | Win | 45–6–3 (1) | Benjamin Blindert | KO | 3 (10) | 15 Feb 2025 | Ratiopharm Arena, Neu-Ulm, Bayern, Germany | |
| 54 | Win | 44–6–3 (1) | Şükrü Altay | TKO | 9 (10), 0:32 | 2 Dec 2023 | Ludwigsburg MHP Arena, Ludwigsburg, Germany | |
| 53 | Win | 43–6–3 (1) | Şükrü Altay | UD | 10 | 18 Feb 2023 | Porsche-Arena, Stuttgart, Germany | |
| 52 | Loss | 42–6–3 (1) | Istvan Szili | MD | 12 | 26 Mar 2022 | Westfalenhallen, Dortmund, Germany | For IBO Inter-Continental super middleweight title |
| 51 | Win | 42–5–3 (1) | James Kraft | UD | 10 | 19 Jun 2021 | Universum Gym, Hamburg, Germany | |
| 50 | Win | 41–5–3 (1) | Timo Rost | UD | 10 | 19 Dec 2020 | Universum Gym, Hamburg, Germany | |
| 49 | Win | 40–5–3 (1) | Fedor Chudinov | MD | 12 | 20 Feb 2016 | König Pilsener Arena, Oberhausen, Germany | Won WBA (Super) super-middleweight title |
| 48 | Loss | 39–5–3 (1) | Fedor Chudinov | SD | 12 | 9 May 2015 | Festhalle, Frankfurt, Germany | For vacant WBA (Regular) super-middleweight title |
| 47 | Draw | 39–4–3 (1) | Robert Stieglitz | SD | 12 | 8 Nov 2014 | Porsche-Arena, Stuttgart, Germany | |
| 46 | Loss | 39–4–2 (1) | Sam Soliman | UD | 12 | 31 May 2014 | König Palast, Krefeld, Germany | Lost IBF middleweight title |
| 45 | Win | 39–3–2 (1) | Darren Barker | TKO | 2 (12), 2:09 | 7 Dec 2013 | Porsche-Arena, Stuttgart, Germany | Won IBF middleweight title |
| 44 | Win | 38–3–2 (1) | Predrag Radošević | TKO | 4 (12), 2:17 | 6 Jul 2013 | Westfalenhallen, Dortmund, Germany | |
| 43 | NC | 37–3–2 (1) | Sam Soliman | UD | 12 | 1 Feb 2013 | ISS Dome, Düsseldorf, Germany | Originally a UD win for Soliman: Overturned to NC after the A sample showed traces of an illegal stimulant |
| 42 | Loss | 37–3–2 | Daniel Geale | SD | 12 | 1 Sep 2012 | König Pilsener Arena, Oberhausen, Germany | Lost WBA (Super) middleweight title; For IBF middleweight title |
| 41 | Win | 37–2–2 | Sebastian Zbik | RTD | 9 (12), 3:00 | 13 Apr 2012 | Lanxess Arena, Cologne, Germany | Retained WBA (Super) middleweight title |
| 40 | Draw | 36–2–2 | Martin Murray | SD | 12 | 2 Dec 2011 | SAP Arena, Mannheim, Germany | Retained WBA (Super) middleweight title |
| 39 | Win | 36–2–1 | Matthew Macklin | SD | 12 | 25 Jun 2011 | Lanxess Arena, Cologne, Germany | Retained WBA (Super) middleweight title |
| 38 | Win | 35–2–1 | Ronald Hearns | TKO | 7 (12), 0:48 | 19 Feb 2011 | Porsche-Arena, Stuttgart, Germany | Retained WBA (Super) middleweight title |
| 37 | Win | 34–2–1 | Giovanni Lorenzo | UD | 12 | 4 Sep 2010 | Lanxess Arena, Cologne, Germany | Retained WBA (Super) middleweight title |
| 36 | Win | 33–2–1 | Khoren Gevor | UD | 12 | 11 Jul 2009 | Nürburgring, Nürburg, Germany | Retained WBA middleweight title |
| 35 | Win | 32–2–1 | Koji Sato | TKO | 7 (12), 2:46 | 25 Apr 2009 | König Palast, Krefeld, Germany | Retained WBA middleweight title |
| 34 | Win | 31–2–1 | Sebastian Sylvester | UD | 12 | 1 Nov 2008 | König Pilsener Arena, Oberhausen, Germany | Retained WBA middleweight title |
| 33 | Win | 30–2–1 | Randy Griffin | UD | 12 | 7 Jul 2008 | Gerry Weber Stadion, Halle, Germany | Retained WBA middleweight title |
| 32 | Win | 29–2–1 | Jamie Pittman | TKO | 7 (12), 0:36 | 5 Apr 2008 | Burg-Wächter Castello, Düsseldorf, Germany | Retained WBA middleweight title |
| 31 | Draw | 28–2–1 | Randy Griffin | SD | 12 | 20 Oct 2007 | Gerry Weber Stadion, Halle, Germany | Retained WBA middleweight title |
| 30 | Win | 28–2 | Noé González Alcoba | UD | 12 | 30 Jun 2007 | Porsche-Arena, Stuttgart, Germany | Retained WBA middleweight title |
| 29 | Win | 27–2 | Javier Castillejo | UD | 12 | 28 Apr 2007 | König Pilsener Arena, Oberhausen, Germany | Won WBA middleweight title |
| 28 | Win | 26–2 | Gavin Topp | TKO | 6 (10), 1:08 | 2 Dec 2006 | Estrel Hotel, Berlin, Germany | |
| 27 | Loss | 25–2 | Javier Castillejo | TKO | 10 (12), 2:47 | 15 Jul 2006 | Color Line Arena, Hamburg, Germany | Lost WBA middleweight title |
| 26 | Win | 25–1 | Maselino Masoe | UD | 12 | 11 Mar 2006 | Color Line Arena, Hamburg, Germany | Won WBA middleweight title |
| 25 | Win | 24–1 | Jorge Sendra | UD | 12 | 18 Jun 2005 | Pula Arena, Pula, Croatia | Retained WBO Inter-Continental middleweight title |
| 24 | Win | 23–1 | Bert Schenk | TKO | 2 (12), 2:01 | 5 Mar 2006 | Wilhelm-Dopatka-Halle, Leverkusen, Germany | Retained WBO Inter-Continental middleweight title |
| 23 | Win | 22–1 | Hacine Cherifi | KO | 3 (8), 2:06 | 4 Dec 2004 | Estrel Hotel, Berlin, Germany | |
| 22 | Win | 21–1 | Robert Frazier | UD | 12 | 18 Sep 2004 | Wilhelm-Dopatka-Halle, Leverkusen, Germany | Won vacant WBO Inter-Continental middleweight title |
| 21 | Loss | 20–1 | Oscar De La Hoya | UD | 12 | 5 Jun 2004 | MGM Grand Garden Arena, Paradise, Nevada, US | Lost WBO middleweight title |
| 20 | Win | 20–0 | Ruben Varon | UD | 12 | 20 Dec 2003 | Ostseehalle, Kiel, Germany | Retained WBO middleweight title |
| 19 | Win | 19–0 | Héctor Javier Velazco | SD | 12 | 13 Sep 2003 | Estrel Hotel, Berlin, Germany | Won WBO middleweight title |
| 18 | Win | 18–0 | Roberto Mario Vecchio | TKO | 5 (12) | 12 Jul 2003 | Wilhelm-Dopatka-Halle, Leverkusen, Germany | Won vacant WBO Inter-Continental middleweight title |
| 17 | Win | 17–0 | Tshepo Mashego | UD | 10 | 10 May 2003 | Hanns-Martin-Schleyer-Halle, Stuttgart, Germany | Retained IBF Youth middleweight title |
| 16 | Win | 16–0 | Javier Alberto Mamani | UD | 10 | 8 Mar 2003 | Preussag Arena, Hanover, Germany | Won vacant IBF Youth middleweight title |
| 15 | Win | 15–0 | Lorant Szabo | UD | 8 | 23 Nov 2002 | Westfalenhalle, Dortmund, Germany | |
| 14 | Win | 14–0 | Anton Lascek | TKO | 3 (8), 2:00 | 5 Oct 2002 | Főnix Hall, Debrecen, Hungary | |
| 13 | Win | 13–0 | Terry Tock | KO | 1 | 14 Sep 2002 | Volkswagen Halle, Braunschweig, Germany | |
| 12 | Win | 12–0 | Gyorgy Bugyik | TKO | 2 (6) | 20 Jul 2002 | Westfalenhallen, Dortmund, Germany | |
| 11 | Win | 11–0 | Didier Nkuku Mupeko | PTS | 6 | 6 Apr 2002 | Universum Gym, Hamburg, Germany | |
| 10 | Win | 10–0 | Robert Davis | PTS | 6 | 15 Dec 2001 | Estrel Hotel, Berlin, Germany | |
| 9 | Win | 9–0 | Mario Lupp | KO | 1 (6) | 24 Nov 2001 | Universum Gym, Hamburg, Germany | |
| 8 | Win | 8–0 | Francesco Pernice | TKO | 4 (6) | 3 Nov 2001 | Hansehalle, Lübeck, Germany | |
| 7 | Win | 7–0 | Anthony Ivory | PTS | 6 | 29 Sep 2001 | Universum Gym, Hamburg, Germany | |
| 6 | Win | 6–0 | Mustapha Stini | PTS | 4 | 21 Jul 2001 | Tivoli Eissporthalle, Aachen, Germany | |
| 5 | Win | 5–0 | Zdenek Zubko | KO | 2 (6) | 16 Jun 2001 | Kisstadion, Budapest, Hungary | |
| 4 | Win | 4–0 | Ramdane Kaouane | TKO | 1 (4) | 5 May 2001 | Volkswagen Halle, Braunschweig, Germany | |
| 3 | Win | 3–0 | Bendele Ilunga | PTS | 4 | 7 Apr 2001 | Universum Gym, Hamburg, Germany | |
| 2 | Win | 2–0 | Slavomir Dendis | KO | 1 (4) | 24 Feb 2001 | Alsterdorfer Sporthalle, Hamburg, Germany | |
| 1 | Win | 1–0 | Antonio Ribeiro | PTS | 4 | 27 Jan 2001 | Rudi-Sedlmayer-Halle, Munich, Germany | |

== Titles in boxing ==
=== Major world titles ===
- IBF middleweight champion (160 lbs)
- WBO middleweight champion (160 lbs)
- WBA (Super) middleweight champion (160 lbs) (2x)
- WBA (Super) super-middleweight champion (168 lbs)

=== Regional/International titles ===
- IBF Youth middleweight champion (160 lbs)
- WBO Inter-Continental middleweight champion (160 lbs) (2x)

== Viewership ==
=== Germany ===
| Date | Fight | Viewership (avg.) | Source(s) |
|---|---|---|---|
| 11 March 2006 | Felix Sturm vs. Maselino Masoe | 5,970,000 | |
| 20 October 2007 | Felix Sturm vs. Randy Griffin | 5,000,000 | |
| 7 July 2008 | Felix Sturm vs. Randy Griffin II | 3,900,000 | |
| 5 April 2008 | Felix Sturm vs. Jamie Pittman | 5,880,000 | |
| 1 November 2008 | Felix Sturm vs. Sebastian Sylvester | 5,920,000 | |
| 4 September 2010 | Felix Sturm vs. Giovanni Lorenzo | 5,270,000 | |
| 19 February 2011 | Felix Sturm vs. Ronald Hearns | 4,740,000 | |
| 25 June 2011 | Felix Sturm vs. Matthew Macklin | 4,550,000 | |
| 3 December 2011 | Felix Sturm vs. Martin Murray | 4,340,000 | |
| 31 May 2014 | Felix Sturm vs. Sam Soliman II | 3,580,000 | |
| | Total viewership | 49,150,000 | |

=== US pay-per-view bouts ===
| Date | Fight | Billing | Buys | Network |
|---|---|---|---|---|
| June 4, 2004 | De La Hoya vs. Sturm | Collision Course | 380,000 | HBO |
| | Total buys | | 380,000 | |

Sporting positions
Regional boxing titles
| New title | IBF Youth middleweight champion 8 March 2003 – July 2003; Vacated | Vacant Title next held by Domenico Spada |
| Vacant Title last held by András Gálfi | WBO Inter-Continental middleweight champion 12 July 2003 – 13 September 2003; Won world title | Vacant Title next held by Mariano Natalio Carrera |
| Vacant Title last held by Mariano Natalio Carrera | WBO Inter-Continental middleweight champion 18 September 2004 – December 2005; Vacated | Vacant Title next held by Khoren Gevor |
Minor world boxing titles
| Preceded by Maselino Masoe | WBA (Regular) middleweight champion 11 March 2006 – 15 July 2006 | Succeeded by Javier Castillejo |
World boxing titles
| Preceded by Héctor Javier Velazco | WBO middleweight champion 13 September 2003 – 5 June 2004 | Succeeded by Oscar De La Hoya |
| Preceded by Javier Castillejo | WBA middleweight champion 28 April 2007 – 1 September 2012; Super title from March 2010 | Succeeded by Daniel Geale |
| Preceded by Darren Barker | IBF middleweight champion 7 December 2013 – 31 May 2014 | Succeeded by Sam Soliman |
| Preceded by Fedor Chudinov | WBA super-middleweight champion Super title 20 February 2016 – 5 October 2016; Vacated | Vacant Title next held by George Groves |
