= Noé González Alcoba =

Uruguayan boxer

Personal information
- Nickname: El Carbonero
- Born: Noé Tulio González Alcoba; 12 May 1979 (age 47) Pando, Uruguay
- Weight: Super Middleweight, Middleweight

Boxing career
- Stance: Orthodox

Boxing record
- Total fights: 36
- Wins: 31
- Win by KO: 23
- Losses: 5
- Draws: 0

Noé González Alcoba (born 12 May 1979) is an Uruguayan boxer and a former world title challenger.

== Professional career ==
Having boxed mainly in Argentina and Uruguay for much of his early career, he managed to land a shot at the WBA World Middleweight title after only 14 fights, challenging the then world champion Felix Sturm in Germany. The German proved too classy however and won the fight by a wide points decision, earning Alcoba his first career defeat.

Alcoba continued to box in Uruguay and Argentina, acquiring an impressive knockout ration and capturing the vacant WBO Latino middleweight title in his 19th bout. He disposed of former WBA middleweight title holder Mariano Natalio Carrera in four rounds, also boxing in the United States to stop rated Mexican middleweight Michi Munoz in six before stepping up to super middleweight to win the WBC Silver belt by a 3rd-round stoppage of a former Mexican middleweight champion Gustavo Magallanes. After a first successful defense of the belt in a bout against Mexican Ruben Padilla, he lost the second defense, suffering his 2nd professional defeat in a 2-round stoppage loss to world title contender and knockout artist Adonis "Superman" Stevenson in Montreal, Canada.

Following the Stevenson loss he has recovered in style, earning two 1st-round knockout wins. He lost in his latest fight to then unbeaten British prospect George Groves by 5th round technical knockout on the Froch vs. Kessler bill in May.

== Professional boxing record ==
30 Wins (22 KOs), 4 Losses, 0 Draw
Res.	Record	Opponent	Type	Round	Date	Location	Notes
Loss	30-4	(United Kingdom) Rocky Fielding	TKO	5	2014-07-12	Echo Arena, Liverpool, Merseyside, United Kingdom	
Loss	30-3	(United Kingdom) George Groves	TKO	5	25 May 2013	London, United Kingdom	
Win	30-2	(Brazil) Idiozan Matos	KO	1	16.02.2013	Montevideo, Uruguay	
Win	29-2	(Argentina) Miguel Angel Cobas	KO	1	20.10.2012	Buenos Aires, Argentina	
Loss	28-2	(Canada) Adonis Stevenson	TKO	2	20.04.2012	Montreal, Canada	For the WBC Silver super middleweight title
Win	28-1	(Mexico) Paul Rodriguez	KO	2	15.10.2011	Los Mochis, Mexico	
Win	27-1	(Mexico) Ruben Padilla	TKO	9	13.05.2011	Montevideo, Uruguay	Defended WBC Silver super middleweight title
Win	26-1	(Mexico) Gustavo Magallanes	TKO	3	09.01.2011	Punta del Este, Uruguay	For WBC Silver super middleweight title
Win	25-1	(Mexico) Antonio Arras	TKO	9	29.10.2010	Mexicali, Mexico	
Win	24-1	(Mexico) Michi Munoz	TKO	6	04.06.2010	Florida, United States	
Win	23-1	(Brazil) Denis De Barros	KO	2	04.12.2009	Santa Fe, Argentina	
Win	22-1	(Brazil) Ismael Bueno	KO	2	06.11.2009	Montevideo, Uruguay	
Win	21-1	(Argentina) Mariano Natalio Carrera	KO	4	20.08.2009	Buenos Aires, Argentina	
Win	20-1	(Brazil) Juraci Conceicao	KO	2	18.06.2009	Montevideo, Uruguay	
Win	19-1	(Argentina) Oscar Bruno Fuchs	KO	2	23.02.2009	Canelones, Uruguay	
Win	18-1	(Argentina) Valentin Antonio Ochoa	TKO	6	10.01.2009	Punta del Este, Uruguay	For WBO Latino middleweight title
Win	17-1	(Argentina) Martin David Islas	TKO	5	25.10.2008	Salto, Uruguay	
Win	16-1	(Argentina) Cristian Ricardo Rizzo	KO	3	05.09.2008	Montevideo, Uruguay	
Win	15-1	(Argentina) Mario Javier Nieva	UD	6	08.08.2008	Montevideo, Uruguay	
Loss	14-1	(Germany) Felix Sturm	UD	12	30.06.2007	Stuttgart, Germany	For the WBA middleweight title.
Win	14-0	(Argentina) Raul Alberto Gutierrez Sanchez	RTD	3	02.06.2007	Santa Fe, Argentina	
Win	13-0	(Argentina) Claudio Ariel Abalos	UD	10	02.12.2006	Pando, Uruguay	For WBA Fedelatin middleweight title.
Win	12-0	(Argentina) Raul Alberto Gutierrez Sanchez	UD	4	13.10.2006	Santa Fe, Argentina	
Win	11-0	(Argentina) Cristian Oscar Zanabria	UD	6	14.09.2006	Montevideo, Uruguay	
Win	10-0	(Argentina) Jose Emilio Mazurier	KO	6	19.08.2006	Santa Fe, Argentina	
Win	9-0	(Argentina) Ricardo Manuel Genero	TKO	3	14.07.2006	Santa Fe, Argentina	
Win	8-0	(Argentina) Lucas Damian Molina	RTD	5	15.04.2006	Buenos Aires, Argentina	
Win	7-0	(Argentina) Santos Tomas Villalba	UD	6	11.02.2006	Santa Fe, Argentina	
Win	6-0	(Argentina) Dante Heraldo Emiliano Hirschfeld	TKO	6	29.10.2005	Buenos Aires, Argentina	
Win	5-0	(Argentina) Santos Tomas Villalba	SD	6	19.08.2005	Santa Fe, Argentina	
Win	4-0	(Argentina) Santos Tomas Villalba	UD	4	20.05.2005	Santa Fe, Argentina	
Win	3-0	(Argentina) Ramon Javier Cabanas	UD	4	26.03.2005	Buenos Aires, Argentina	
Win	2-0	(Argentina) Jose Luis Carrizo	KO	2	06.11.2004	Santa Fe, Argentina	
Win	1-0	(Argentina) Jose Luis Olivera	KO	1	02.10.2004	Buenos Aires, Argentina	
