= Jorge Sclarandi =

Argentine boxer

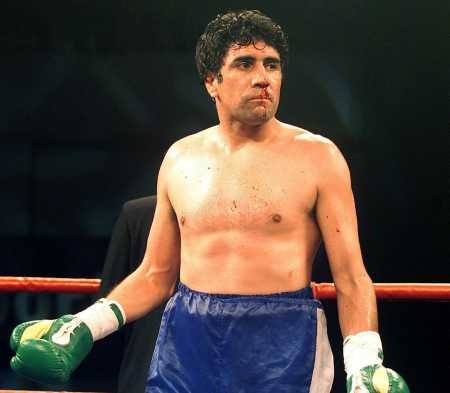

Personal information
- Nickname: La Garza / The Heron / Scarlandi
- Nationality: Argentine
- Born: Jorge Andrés Sclarandi; January 13, 1967 (age 59) Lomas de Zamora, Buenos Aires
- Height: 6 ft 3 in (1.91 m)
- Weight: Super Middleweight

Boxing career
- Stance: Orthodox

Boxing record
- Total fights: 51
- Wins: 28
- Win by KO: 2
- Losses: 21
- Draws: 1
- No contests: 0

Jorge Andrés Sclarandi (born January 13, 1967) is an Argentina professional boxer.

On November 6, 1999 Jorge Sclarandi faced Juan Italo Meza for the South American middleweight title, which he won on points.

On October 20, 2001 in Kelvin Hall, Glasgow, Scotland. Jorge took on Robin Reid for the WBF Super Middleweight title. Reid struggled to KO Jorge and although the fight was all one way traffic, Reid resorted to head butting and elbowing, to try to knock out Jorge, who refused to give up and took Reid's best shots and stayed mainly on the ropes taking punches. Referee Marcus McDonnell stopped the fight due to the blood coming from the nose of Jorge Sclarandi which was caused by Reid head butting Jorge Sclarandi.

== Professional boxing record ==
28 Wins (2 KOs), 21 Losses, 1 Draw
Res.	Record	Opponent	Type	Round, Time	Date	Location	Notes
Loss	28-21-1	(Argentina) Mariano Natalio Carrera	KO	10 (12)	2004-09-11	Polideportivo Carlos Cerutti, Córdoba, Argentina	
Loss	28-20-1	(Australia) Sam Soliman	TKO	8 (8)	2004-03-07	Penrith, Australia	
Loss	28-19-1	(Argentina) Marcos Silvano Diaz	UD	12 (12)	2003-08-23	Ce.De.M. N° 2, Caseros, Argentina	Loss WBA Fedelatin middleweight title
Win	28-18-1	(Argentina) Marcos Silvano Diaz	SD	12 (12)	2003-05-17	Ce.De.M. N° 2, Caseros, Argentina	Won WBA Fedelatin middleweight title
Loss	27-18-1	(Australia) Danny Green	TKO	6 (12)	2003-03-15	Challenge Stadium, Perth, Australia	
Win	27-17-1	(Argentina) Julio César Vásquez	UD	10 (10)	2002-11-09	Estadio F.A.B., Buenos Aires, Argentina	
Loss	26-17-1	(United Kingdom) Robin Reid	KO	3 (12)	2001-10-20	(United Kingdom) Kelvin Hall, Glasgow, Scotland	For WBF super middleweight title.
Loss	26-16-1	(Argentina) Julio César Vásquez	SD	10 (10)	2000-02-19	Club Atlético Quilmes, Mar del Plata, Argentina	
Win	26-15-1	(Italy) Alessandro Filippo	TKO	4 (8)	1999-12-18	Porto Torres, Italy	
Win	25-15-1	(Argentina) Juan Italo Meza	UD	12 (12)	1999-11-06	Radisson Victoria Plaza, Montevideo, Uruguay	
Win	24-15-1	(Argentina) Ariel Patricio Arrieta	UD	6 (6)	1999-09-10	Club Santa Fe, Lomas de Zamora, Argentina	
Win	23-15-1	(Argentina) Jose Luis Loyola	PTS	6 (6)	1999-08-28	Club Argentino de Quilmes, Quilmes, Argentina	
Loss	22-15-1	(France) Hacine Cherifi	DQ	7 (8)	1999-06-18	Lyon, France	
Loss	22-14-1	(Germany) Mario Veit	UD	10 (10)	1999-01-30	Stadthalle, Cottbus, Germany	
Win	22-13-1	(Argentina) Ramon Arturo Britez	DQ	10 (10)	1998-11-27	Buenos Aires, Argentina	
Loss	21-13-1	(Argentina) Hugo Ruben Gonzalez	PTS	10 (10)	1998-07-04	Buenos Aires, Argentina	
Loss	21-12-1	(Brazil) Peter Venancio	PTS	10 (10)	1998-05-23	Hotel & Casino Conrad, Punta del Este, Uruguay	
Loss	21-11-1	(South Africa) Giovanni Pretorius	TKO	2 (10)	1998-03-29	Morula Sun, Mabopane, North-West, South Africa	
Loss	21-10-1	(France) Morrade Hakkar	PTS	8 (8)	1997-08-16	La Palestre, Le Cannet, France	
Win	21-9-1	(Argentina) Dario Victor Galindez	PTS	10 (10)	1997-05-10	Estadio F.A.B., Buenos Aires, Argentina	
