= Randy Griffin =

American boxer

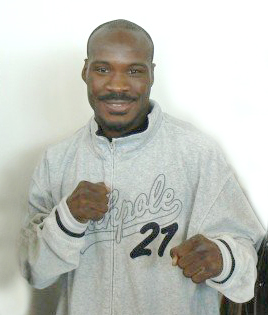

Personal information
- Nickname: The Gentleman
- Nationality: American (US)
- Born: Randy Griffin; June 7, 1976 (age 50) Philadelphia, PA
- Height: 5 ft 11 in (180 cm)
- Weight: Middleweight

Boxing career
- Stance: Orthodox

Boxing record
- Total fights: 32
- Wins: 25
- Win by KO: 13
- Losses: 4
- Draws: 3
- No contests: 0

Randy Griffin (born June 7, 1976) is a professional boxer. While best known as a middleweight, he began as a light heavyweight and worked his way down in weight class. Griffin unsuccessfully challenged for the WBA Middleweight title on October 20, 2007, managing a draw against defending champion Felix Sturm, but losing against him July 5, 2008.

As an amateur Griffin was the 1997 and 1999 Pennsylvania State Golden Gloves champion. He also competed in the 1998 Goodwill Games, in the 75 kg weight class, losing to Jean-Paul Mendy of France in the quarterfinals.
