= Minnesota Boxing Hall of Fame =

Commemorative organization

The Minnesota Boxing Hall of Fame is a commemorative organization with plans to create a museum. It celebrates the history of boxing in the state of Minnesota by honoring individuals whose achievements within the sport are noteworthy.

== History ==
Though several individuals had previously considered creating a hall of fame for Minnesota boxing, it was noted boxing historian Jake Wegner who pulled together the local boxing community in 2009, filed for nonprofit status, and assembled a board of directors for the new hall. With Wegner as the president, the board consisted of Jeff Flanagan (Vice-President), Don Evans (Treasurer), Jim Wells (Secretary), Denny Nelson, Jim Carlin, and Wayne Bebeau. The inaugural class of inductees was announced on July 5, 2010 and the induction banquet took place on October 12, 2010.

In April 2014, founder and President, Jake Wegner resigned from the organization.

In May 2014, Jeff Flanagan was elected president. The Minnesota Boxing board consists of Vice President Denny Nelson, Secretary Jim Wells, Treasurer Don Evans, Executive board members Mark Nelson and Pete Holm.

== Location ==
A permanent location for the museum has not been determined. www.mnbhof.org

== Inductees ==
=== Class of 2010 ===
Date: October 12, 2010
Venue: Jax Café Steakhouse. Minneapolis, MN

- Del Flanagan
- Glen Flanagan
- Mike Gibbons
- Tommy Gibbons
- Will Grigsby
- Bill Kaehn
- Scott LeDoux
- Harris Martin
- Don Riley
- Rafael Rodriguez
- Dr. Sheldon Segal

=== Class of 2011 ===
Date: October 11, 2011
Venue: Nicollet Island Pavilion. Minneapolis, MN

- Charley Kemmick
- Mike O'Dowd
- Johnny Ertle
- Jackie Graves
- Duane Bobick
- Mike Evgen
- Joe Daszkiewicz
- Emmett Weller
- George Barton

=== Class of 2012 ===
Date: September 28, 2012
Venue: Mystic Lake Casino. Prior Lake, MN

- Oscar Gardner
- Jimmy Delaney
- Billy Miske
- Lee Savold
- Jim Beattie
- Jerry Slavin
- Dick Cullum
- Denny Nelson

=== Class of 2013 ===
Date:September 27, 2013
Venue: Mystic Lake Casino. Prior Lake, MN

- Danny Needham
- Jock Malone
- Billy Petrolle
- Pat O'Connor
- Doug Demmings
- Gary Holmgren
- Dan Schommer
- Tony Stecher
- Jack Raleigh

=== Class of 2014 ===
Date: October 3, 2014
Venue: Mystic Lake Casino. Prior Lake, MN

- King Tut
- Jack Gibbons
- Bobby Rodriguez
- Al Andrews
- Jim Morgan
- Jimmy O'Hara

=== Class of 2015 ===
Date: October 2, 2015
Venue: Mystic Lake Casino. Prior Lake, MN

- Danny Davis
- Duane Horsman
- Mel Brown
- Art Lasky
- Charley Retzlaff
- Sammy Gallop
- Mike Collins
- Jim Wells

=== Class of 2016 ===
Date: October 14, 2016
Venue: Mystic Lake Casino. Prior Lake, MN

- Rodney Bobick
- Jim Hegerle
- Larry LaCoursiere
- Fred Lenhart
- My Sullivan
- George Blair
- Leo Ryan
- Earl Kaehn
- Pat Killen
