= Lauro Salas =

Mexican boxer (1928–1987)

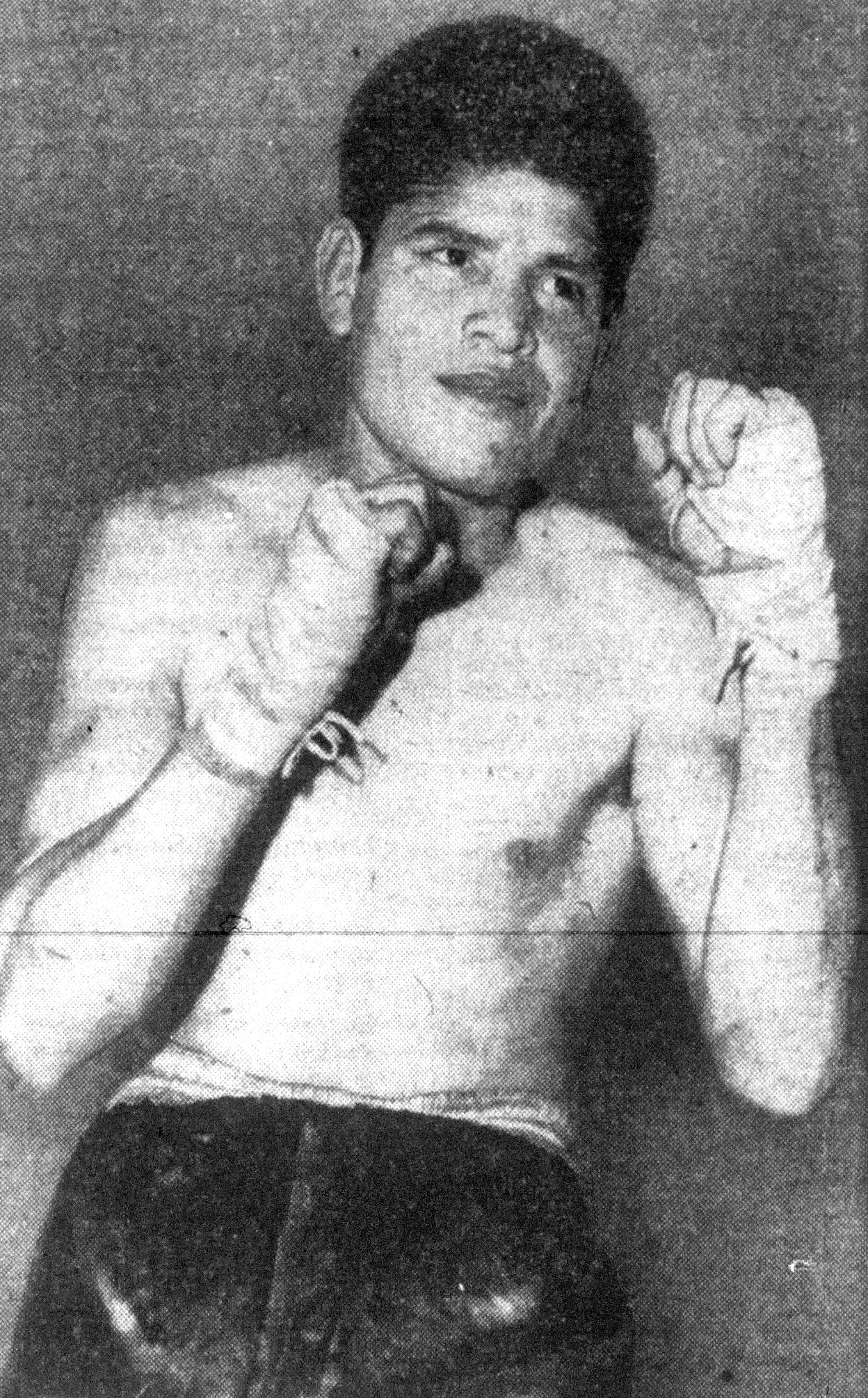
- Salas, circa 1951

Personal information
- Nickname: Lion of Monterrey
- Born: August 28, 1928 Monterrey, Nuevo León, Mexico
- Died: January 18, 1987 (aged 58)
- Height: 5 ft 6 in (1.68 m)
- Weight: Lightweight

Boxing career
- Reach: 67 in (170 cm)
- Stance: Orthodox

Boxing record
- Total fights: 163
- Wins: 91
- Win by KO: 45
- Losses: 58
- Draws: 13
- No contests: 1

Lauro Salas (28 August 1928 in Monterrey, Nuevo León, Mexico – 18 January 1987) was a Mexican professional boxer who held the Undisputed World Lightweight Championship from May 14 – October 15, 1952.

== Professional career ==
Salas was known as a tireless puncher, who often would wear his opponents out in the late rounds with a volume of punches. Boxing as a Featherweight for much of his early career, he was given a title shot against Lightweight champion Jimmy Carter on April 1, 1952, at the Olympic Auditorium in Los Angeles. Appearing to be well behind for the first ten rounds, Salas staged a late rally in the championship rounds, which he capped off with a two-count knockdown of the champion in the 15th round. Carter would win the unanimous decision, even as Salas won a lot of respect for his valiant effort.

Six weeks later as a 4-to-1 underdog he faced Carter again for the title at the Olympic in a rematch. This time around, he got off to a much better start, cut the champion, and once again overwhelmed Carter with his pressure in the late rounds. This time around, he was awarded a split decision over Carter, to win the World Lightweight Title.

On October 15, 1952, Salas fought a rubber match with Carter at Chicago Stadium. In the rematch Carter established control inside, dictating the pace, and cutting Salas over both of the eyes. With his vision hampered by cuts, along with the punishment he had taken from Carter, he was unable to sustain a late rally. Carter was awarded a wide unanimous decision, to regain the Lightweight title for the 2nd time.

== Professional boxing record ==
163 fights	91 wins	58 losses
By knockout	45	8
By decision	46	49
By disqualification	0	1
Draws	13	
No contests	1	

No.	Result	Record	Opponent	Type	Round	Date	Location	Notes
163	Loss	91–58–13 (1)	Bunny Grant	TKO	8 (10)	Mar 4, 1961	Sabina Park, Kingston, Jamaica	
162	Loss	91–57–13 (1)	Sebastiao Nascimento	TKO	2 (10)	Dec 2, 1960	Ginásio Estadual do Ibirapuera, Sao Paulo, Sao Paulo, Brazil	
161	Loss	91–56–13 (1)	Antonio Gutierrez	PTS	10	Aug 27, 1960	Ciudad Obregon, Sonora, Mexico	
160	Win	91–55–13 (1)	Chuck Flores	SD	10	Aug 23, 1960	Madison Square Garden, Phoenix, Arizona, U.S.	
159	Loss	90–55–13 (1)	Harlow Irwin	UD	10	Jul 28, 1960	Parade Grounds, Minneapolis, Minnesota, U.S.	
158	Win	90–54–13 (1)	Harlow Irwin	TKO	3 (10)	Jun 7, 1960	Auditorium, Minneapolis, Minnesota, U.S.	
157	Draw	89–54–13 (1)	Osamu Watanabe	PTS	10	Apr 8, 1960	Tokyo, Japan	
156	Loss	89–54–12 (1)	Alfredo Urbina	KO	6 (10)	Feb 20, 1960	Monterrey, Nuevo León, Mexico	
155	Draw	89–53–12 (1)	Claudio Adame	PTS	10	Nov 24, 1959	County Coliseum, El Paso, Texas, U.S.	
154	Draw	89–53–11 (1)	Frank Valdez	PTS	10	Sep 8, 1959	Municipal Auditorium, San Antonio, Texas, U.S.	
153	Loss	89–53–10 (1)	Damaso Collazo	PTS	10	Aug 1, 1959	Monterrey, Nuevo León, Mexico	
152	NC	89–52–10 (1)	Joey Lopes	NC	9 (10)	Jun 16, 1959	Civic Auditorium, Albuquerque, New Mexico, U.S.	Salas was struck by a low blow and could not continue
151	Win	89–52–10	Johnny Shaw	SD	10	Apr 30, 1959	Civic Auditorium, Albuquerque, New Mexico, U.S.	
150	Win	88–52–10	Tano Serna	SD	10	Apr 21, 1959	City Coliseum, Austin, Texas, U.S.	
149	Loss	87–52–10	Eddie Pace	PTS	10	Mar 31, 1959	Swing Auditorium, San Bernardino, California, U.S.	
148	Win	87–51–10	Collier Cox	MD	10	Mar 3, 1959	Memorial Auditorium, Fresno, California, U.S.	
147	Win	86–51–10	Henry Gutierrez	UD	10	Feb 17, 1959	Auditorio Municipal, Ciudad Juarez, Chihuahua, Mexico	
146	Win	85–51–10	Hector Ceballos	KO	6 (10)	Jan 28, 1959	Hermosillo, Sonora, Mexico	
145	Win	84–51–10	Joe Arias	KO	7 (10)	Jan 24, 1959	Guaymas, Sonora, Mexico	
144	Win	83–51–10	Collier Cox	SD	10	Jan 15, 1959	Sports Arena, Yuma, Arizona, U.S.	
143	Loss	82–51–10	Cisco Andrade	TKO	8 (10)	Sep 13, 1958	Legion Stadium, Hollywood, California, U.S.	
142	Win	82–50–10	Angel Guerrero	KO	9 (10)	Jul 12, 1958	Monterrey, Nuevo León, Mexico	
141	Loss	81–50–10	Davey Moore	UD	10	Jun 19, 1958	Olympic Auditorium, Los Angeles, California, U.S.	
140	Loss	81–49–10	Pete Kawula	UD	10	Mar 1, 1958	Legion Stadium, Hollywood, California, U.S.	
139	Win	81–48–10	Noel Humphreys	UD	10	Feb 8, 1958	Legion Stadium, Hollywood, California, U.S.	
138	Loss	80–48–10	Ernesto Parra	SD	10	Jan 16, 1958	Olympic Auditorium, Los Angeles, California, U.S.	
137	Loss	80–47–10	Bobby Scanlon	UD	10	Dec 19, 1957	Civic Auditorium, San Francisco, California, U.S.	
136	Win	80–46–10	Lulu Perez	UD	10	Oct 19, 1957	Legion Stadium, Hollywood, California, U.S.	
135	Win	79–46–10	Julian Velasquez	KO	8 (10)	Oct 5, 1957	Legion Stadium, Hollywood, California, U.S.	
134	Loss	78–46–10	Paul Armstead	UD	12	Aug 3, 1957	Legion Stadium, Hollywood, California, U.S.	For vacant USA California State lightweight title
133	Loss	78–45–10	Pete Kawula	MD	10	Jun 29, 1957	Legion Stadium, Hollywood, California, U.S.	
132	Win	78–44–10	Noel Humphreys	PTS	10	May 20, 1957	Plaza de Toros, Tijuana, Baja California, Mexico	
131	Loss	77–44–10	Ike Chestnut	MD	10	Apr 25, 1957	Olympic Auditorium, Los Angeles, California, U.S.	
130	Win	77–43–10	Armand Savoie	UD	10	Feb 23, 1957	Legion Stadium, Hollywood, California, U.S.	
129	Draw	76–43–10	Tommy Tibbs	PTS	10	Feb 2, 1957	Legion Stadium, Hollywood, California, U.S.	
128	Loss	76–43–9	Tommy Tibbs	UD	10	Jan 12, 1957	Legion Stadium, Hollywood, California, U.S.	
127	Win	76–42–9	Tommy Tibbs	SD	10	Nov 17, 1956	Legion Stadium, Hollywood, California, U.S.	
126	Draw	75–42–9	Bobby Bell	SD	10	Oct 13, 1956	Legion Stadium, Hollywood, California, U.S.	
125	Win	75–42–8	Lou Filippo	TKO	9 (10)	Sep 22, 1956	Legion Stadium, Hollywood, California, U.S.	
124	Loss	74–42–8	Jimmy Carter	UD	10	Jun 21, 1956	Olympic Auditorium, Los Angeles, California, U.S.	
123	Win	74–41–8	Billy Evans	PTS	10	May 14, 1956	Coliseum, San Diego, California, U.S.	
122	Win	73–41–8	Sonny Mendia	TKO	5 (10)	May 3, 1956	Olympic Auditorium, Los Angeles, California, U.S.	
121	Win	72–41–8	Ralph Capone	TKO	3 (10)	Mar 22, 1956	Olympic Auditorium, Los Angeles, California, U.S.	
120	Loss	71–41–8	Ruben Salazar	SD	10	Feb 9, 1956	Olympic Auditorium, Los Angeles, California, U.S.	
119	Loss	71–40–8	Paul Jorgensen	MD	10	Jan 17, 1956	Sam Houston Coliseum, Houston, Texas, U.S.	
118	Loss	71–39–8	Martin Guije Rodriguez	PTS	10	Dec 17, 1955	Palacio de Deportes, Havana, Cuba	
117	Win	71–38–8	Billy Evans	KO	7 (10)	Dec 8, 1955	Olympic Auditorium, Los Angeles, California, U.S.	
116	Win	70–38–8	Pete Aguirre	TKO	10 (10)	Nov 1, 1955	Memorial Auditorium, Sacramento, California, U.S.	
115	Win	69–38–8	Dom Sacco	TKO	4 (10)	Oct 20, 1955	Olympic Auditorium, Los Angeles, California, U.S.	
114	Win	68–38–8	Gaby Macias	KO	9 (10)	Sep 24, 1955	Legion Stadium, Hollywood, California, U.S.	
113	Loss	67–38–8	Ciro Morasen	PTS	10	Sep 7, 1955	Palacio de Deportes, Havana, Cuba	
112	Win	67–37–8	Epifanio Garcia	KO	9 (10)	Sep 1, 1955	Olympic Auditorium, Los Angeles, California, U.S.	
111	Win	66–37–8	Pupi Garcia	KO	9 (10)	Jun 29, 1955	Palacio de Deportes, Havana, Cuba	
110	Win	65–37–8	Gil Velarde	UD	10	Jun 9, 1955	Olympic Auditorium, Los Angeles, California, U.S.	
109	Win	64–37–8	Pete Aguirre	TKO	10 (10)	Jun 2, 1955	Olympic Auditorium, Los Angeles, California, U.S.	
108	Loss	63–37–8	Cisco Andrade	UD	10	Apr 28, 1955	Olympic Auditorium, Los Angeles, California, U.S.	
107	Loss	63–36–8	Don Jordan	SD	12	Mar 31, 1955	Olympic Auditorium, Los Angeles, California, U.S.	For USA California State lightweight title
106	Win	63–35–8	Cisco Andrade	SD	10	Feb 17, 1955	Olympic Auditorium, Los Angeles, California, U.S.	
105	Loss	62–35–8	Don Jordan	UD	12	Jan 13, 1955	Olympic Auditorium, Los Angeles, California, U.S.	For USA California State lightweight title
104	Win	62–34–8	Mickey Zielke	TKO	6 (8)	Dec 30, 1954	Auditorium, Minneapolis, Minnesota, U.S.	
103	Win	61–34–8	Sonny Strauss	KO	4 (10)	Dec 20, 1954	Eastside Arena, Los Angeles, California, U.S.	
102	Loss	60–34–8	Sonny Strauss	DQ	8 (10)	Nov 24, 1954	Ice Arena, Albuquerque, New Mexico, U.S.	
101	Loss	60–33–8	Art Ramponi	KO	4 (10)	Oct 19, 1954	Memorial Auditorium, Sacramento, California, U.S.	
100	Win	60–32–8	Gil Velarde	TKO	9 (10)	Oct 5, 1954	Memorial Auditorium, Sacramento, California, U.S.	
99	Win	59–32–8	Alex Fimbres	TKO	2 (10)	Sep 13, 1954	Olympic Auditorium, Los Angeles, California, U.S.	
98	Loss	58–32–8	Pete Aguirre	MD	10	Aug 31, 1954	Memorial Auditorium, Sacramento, California, U.S.	
97	Loss	58–31–8	Jose Gonzalez	TKO	8 (10)	Jun 16, 1954	Monterrey, Nuevo León, Mexico	
96	Loss	58–30–8	Juan Padilla	TKO	8 (10)	Feb 6, 1954	Monterrey, Nuevo León, Mexico	
95	Win	58–29–8	Juan Navarro	PTS	10	Oct 10, 1953	Monterrey, Nuevo León, Mexico	
94	Win	57–29–8	Ernesto Aguilar	PTS	10	Aug 15, 1953	Monterrey, Nuevo León, Mexico	
93	Loss	56–29–8	Humberto Carrillo	PTS	10	Jun 22, 1953	Arena La Rosita, Torreon, Coahuila de Zaragoza, Mexico	
92	Win	56–28–8	Pepe Alvarez	TKO	7 (10)	Jun 10, 1953	Monterrey, Nuevo León, Mexico	
91	Loss	55–28–8	Pat Marcune	MD	10	Feb 27, 1953	Madison Square Garden, New York City, New York, U.S.	
90	Loss	55–27–8	Bobby Why	SD	10	Jan 29, 1953	Civic Auditorium, San Jose, California, U.S.	
89	Win	55–26–8	Del Cockayne	KO	4 (10)	Jan 20, 1953	Memorial Auditorium, Sacramento, California, U.S.	
88	Loss	54–26–8	Tommy Collins	UD	10	Dec 8, 1952	Boston Garden, Boston, Massachusetts, U.S.	
87	Loss	54–25–8	Jimmy Carter	UD	15	Oct 15, 1952	Chicago Stadium, Chicago, Illinois, U.S.	Lost NYSAC, NBA, and The Ring lightweight titles
86	Win	54–24–8	Ramon Yung	KO	5 (10)	Sep 23, 1952	Madison Square Garden, Phoenix, Arizona, U.S.	
85	Win	53–24–8	Harold Dade	KO	4 (10)	Jun 22, 1952	Arena Monterrey, Monterrey, Nuevo León, Mexico	
84	Win	52–24–8	Jimmy Carter	SD	15	May 14, 1952	Olympic Auditorium, Los Angeles, California, U.S.	Won NYSAC, NBA, and The Ring lightweight titles
83	Loss	51–24–8	Jimmy Carter	UD	15	Apr 1, 1952	Olympic Auditorium, Los Angeles, California, U.S.	For NYSAC, NBA, and The Ring lightweight titles
82	Loss	51–23–8	Art Aragon	MD	10	Mar 4, 1952	Olympic Auditorium, Los Angeles, California, U.S.	
81	Win	51–22–8	Tony Espinosa	TKO	10 (10)	Feb 22, 1952	Legion Stadium, Hollywood, California, U.S.	
80	Win	50–22–8	Javier Gutierrez	UD	12	Feb 12, 1952	Olympic Auditorium, Los Angeles, California, U.S.	Retained USA California State featherweight title
79	Win	49–22–8	Alfredo Escobar	KO	3 (10)	Feb 1, 1952	Tucson Garden, Tucson, Arizona, U.S.	
78	Win	48–22–8	Chucho Mendoza	KO	4 (10)	Jan 30, 1952	Madison Square Garden, Phoenix, Arizona, U.S.	
77	Draw	47–22–8	Bobby Why	PTS	10	Jan 4, 1952	Legion Stadium, Hollywood, California, U.S.	
76	Loss	47–22–7	Memo Valero	PTS	10	Nov 3, 1951	Arena Coliseo, Mexico City, Distrito Federal, Mexico	
75	Win	47–21–7	Jackie Blair	UD	10	Oct 19, 1951	Legion Stadium, Hollywood, California, U.S.	
74	Win	46–21–7	Fabela Chavez	TKO	12 (12)	Sep 28, 1951	Legion Stadium, Hollywood, California, U.S.	Won USA California State featherweight title
73	Win	45–21–7	Gabriel Diaz	PTS	10	Aug 11, 1951	Arena Coliseo, Mexico City, Distrito Federal, Mexico	
72	Loss	44–21–7	Fabela Chavez	MD	12	Jul 27, 1951	Legion Stadium, Hollywood, California, U.S.	Lost USA California State featherweight title
71	Draw	44–20–7	Fabela Chavez	PTS	12	Jun 29, 1951	Legion Stadium, Hollywood, California, U.S.	Retained USA California State featherweight title
70	Win	44–20–6	Carlos Chávez	UD	10	Jun 8, 1951	Legion Stadium, Hollywood, California, U.S.	
69	Loss	43–20–6	Jackie Blair	SD	10	May 22, 1951	Municipal Auditorium, San Antonio, Texas, U.S.	
68	Loss	43–19–6	Sandy Saddler	TKO	6 (10)	Mar 27, 1951	Olympic Auditorium, Los Angeles, California, U.S.	
67	Win	43–18–6	Luis Adame	KO	5 (10)	Feb 16, 1951	Legion Stadium, Hollywood, California, U.S.	
66	Win	42–18–6	Manuel Ortiz	MD	10	Jan 26, 1951	Legion Stadium, Hollywood, California, U.S.	
65	Loss	41–18–6	Rudy Garcia	PTS	10	Jan 5, 1951	Legion Stadium, Hollywood, California, U.S.	
64	Win	41–17–6	Rudy Garcia	UD	12	Dec 8, 1950	Legion Stadium, Hollywood, California, U.S.	Won USA California State featherweight title
63	Win	40–17–6	Dave Gallardo	SD	10	Nov 24, 1950	Legion Stadium, Hollywood, California, U.S.	
62	Win	39–17–6	Jesus Alonso	TKO	5 (10)	Sep 30, 1950	Plaza de Toros Monumental, Monterrey, Nuevo León, Mexico	
61	Loss	38–17–6	Archie Whitewater	PTS	10	Jun 3, 1950	Municipal Auditorium, Eureka, California, U.S.	
60	Loss	38–16–6	Sandy Saddler	TKO	9 (15)	Apr 18, 1950	Arena, Cleveland, Ohio, U.S.	For NBA junior lightweight title
59	Win	38–15–6	Jock Leslie	KO	5 (10)	Mar 28, 1950	New Olympiad Arena, Houston, Texas, U.S.	
58	Win	37–15–6	Chico Rosa	UD	10	Mar 21, 1950	Olympic Auditorium, Santa Monica, California, U.S.	
57	Win	36–15–6	Rudy Vasquez	UD	10	Mar 13, 1950	Ocean Park Arena, Santa Monica, California, U.S.	
56	Win	35–15–6	Rocky Lucero	TKO	5 (10)	Mar 6, 1950	Ocean Park Arena, Santa Monica, California, U.S.	
55	Win	34–15–6	Jock Leslie	TKO	3 (10)	Feb 7, 1950	Olympic Auditorium, Los Angeles, California, U.S.	
54	Win	33–15–6	Baby LeRoy	SD	10	Jan 31, 1950	Memorial Auditorium, Sacramento, California, U.S.	
53	Loss	32–15–6	Glen Flanagan	PTS	10	Dec 29, 1949	Auditorium, Minneapolis, Minnesota, U.S.	
52	Win	32–14–6	Mel Hammond	SD	10	Dec 8, 1949	Auditorium, Minneapolis, Minnesota, U.S.	
51	Win	31–14–6	Johnny Efhan	PTS	10	Nov 30, 1949	Stockton, California, U.S.	
50	Draw	30–14–6	Baby LeRoy	PTS	10	Oct 20, 1949	Memorial Auditorium, Sacramento, California, U.S.	
49	Draw	30–14–5	Felix Ramirez	PTS	10	Oct 10, 1949	Ocean Park Arena, Santa Monica, California, U.S.	
48	Loss	30–14–4	Felix Ramirez	UD	10	Sep 20, 1949	San Jose, California, U.S.	
47	Win	30–13–4	Rocky Lucero	PTS	10	Sep 7, 1949	Valley Garden Arena, Los Angeles, California, U.S.	
46	Win	29–13–4	Pinky Peralta	KO	6 (10)	Jul 2, 1949	Arena Coliseo, Mexico City, Distrito Federal, Mexico	
45	Win	28–13–4	Chuck Wilkerson	PTS	10	Jun 16, 1949	San Jose, California, U.S.	
44	Win	27–13–4	Bobby Why	KO	4 (10)	Jun 6, 1949	Ocean Park Arena, Santa Monica, California, U.S.	
43	Loss	26–13–4	Manuel Ortiz	UD	10	Apr 26, 1949	Olympic Auditorium, Los Angeles, California, U.S.	
42	Loss	26–12–4	Carlos Chávez	UD	10	Mar 15, 1949	Olympic Auditorium, Los Angeles, California, U.S.	
41	Win	26–11–4	Alfredo Escobar	UD	10	Feb 22, 1949	Olympic Auditorium, Los Angeles, California, U.S.	
40	Win	25–11–4	Baby Mickey	TKO	12	Feb 9, 1949	Madison Square Garden, Phoenix, Arizona, U.S.	
39	Loss	24–11–4	Harold Dade	UD	12	Dec 7, 1948	Olympic Auditorium, Los Angeles, California, U.S.	For vacant USA California State featherweight title
38	Loss	24–10–4	Manuel Rivera	PTS	10	Nov 17, 1948	El Paso, Texas, U.S.	
37	Loss	24–9–4	Carlos Chávez	UD	10	Oct 26, 1948	Olympic Auditorium, Los Angeles, California, U.S.	
36	Win	24–8–4	Manuel Ortiz	UD	10	Sep 28, 1948	Olympic Auditorium, Los Angeles, California, U.S.	
35	Win	23–8–4	Manny Ortega	KO	3 (10)	Aug 27, 1948	Liberty Hall, El Paso, Texas, U.S.	Won USA Texas State featherweight title
34	Win	22–8–4	Buddy Jacklich	UD	10	Aug 16, 1948	Coliseum Bowl, San Francisco, California, U.S.	
33	Win	21–8–4	Lawton DiSoso	PTS	10	Aug 10, 1948	Memorial Auditorium, Sacramento, California, U.S.	
32	Win	20–8–4	Bobby Jackson	TKO	7 (10)	Jun 25, 1948	Legion Stadium, Hollywood, California, U.S.	
31	Win	19–8–4	Ralph Lara	TKO	4 (10)	May 4, 1948	San Jose, California, U.S.	
30	Loss	18–8–4	Mario Trigo	UD	10	Apr 23, 1948	Legion Stadium, Hollywood, California, U.S.	
29	Win	18–7–4	Pee Wee Swingler	MD	10	Apr 5, 1948	Ocean Park Arena, Santa Monica, California, U.S.	
28	Draw	17–7–4	Alfredo Escobar	PTS	10	Mar 12, 1948	Legion Stadium, Hollywood, California, U.S.	
27	Loss	17–7–3	Harold Dade	PTS	10	Mar 3, 1948	Memorial Auditorium, Sacramento, California, U.S.	
26	Loss	17–6–3	Raul Esqueda	SD	10	Jan 19, 1948	Ocean Park Arena, Santa Monica, California, U.S.	
25	Win	17–5–3	Jackie Romero	PTS	10	Jan 13, 1948	Memorial Auditorium, Sacramento, California, U.S.	
24	Win	16–5–3	Felix Bueno	PTS	10	Dec 9, 1947	San Jose, California, U.S.	
23	Win	15–5–3	Felix Ramirez	KO	4 (10)	Nov 25, 1947	San Jose, California, U.S.	
22	Win	14–5–3	Ron Cannon	KO	8 (10)	Nov 18, 1947	Civic Auditorium, San Jose, California, U.S.	
21	Draw	13–5–3	Trinidad Perez	PTS	6	Oct 29, 1947	County Coliseum, El Paso, Texas, U.S.	
20	Win	13–5–2	Felix Ramirez	UD	10	Sep 30, 1947	Civic Auditorium, San Jose, California, U.S.	
19	Win	12–5–2	Curtis James	KO	2 (6)	Sep 26, 1947	Coliseum, San Diego, California, U.S.	
18	Win	11–5–2	Ron Cannon	PTS	4	Sep 22, 1947	Ocean Park Arena, Santa Monica, California, U.S.	
17	Win	10–5–2	Julio Muriel	UD	6	Sep 11, 1947	Plaza de Toros, Ciudad Juarez, Chihuahua, Mexico	
16	Win	9–5–2	Sammy Anders	UD	6	Sep 2, 1947	Olympic Auditorium, Los Angeles, California, U.S.	
15	Win	8–5–2	Al Sandoval	TKO	2 (6)	Aug 12, 1947	Olympic Auditorium, Los Angeles, California, U.S.	
14	Draw	7–5–2	Ray Sandoval	PTS	6	Jul 22, 1947	Olympic Auditorium, Los Angeles, California, U.S.	
13	Win	7–5–1	Bee Jimenez	PTS	4	Jul 7, 1947	Ocean Park Arena, Santa Monica, California, U.S.	
12	Loss	6–5–1	Pee Wee Swingler	PTS	6	Jun 17, 1947	Olympic Auditorium, Los Angeles, California, U.S.	
11	Loss	6–4–1	Francisco Gaytan	PTS	10	Apr 5, 1947	Matamoros, Tamaulipas, Mexico	
10	Loss	6–3–1	Francisco Gaytan	PTS	10	Mar 22, 1947	Matamoros, Tamaulipas, Mexico	
9	Draw	6–2–1	Baby Tampico	PTS	10	Nov 5, 1946	Fair Park Arena, Harlingen, Texas, U.S.	
8	Loss	6–2	Baby Tampico	PTS	10	Oct 22, 1946	Fair Park Arena, Harlingen, Texas, U.S.	
7	Win	6–1	Gonzalo Buenrostro	TKO	8 (10)	Aug 24, 1946	Monterrey, Nuevo León, Mexico	
6	Win	5–1	Richard Garcia	PTS	4	Aug 23, 1946	Corpus Christi, Texas, U.S.	
5	Win	4–1	Bobby Dykes	PTS	4	Jul 19, 1946	Spudder Park, Corpus Christi, Texas, U.S.	
4	Loss	3–1	Chino Puente	PTS	6	Jun 28, 1946	Spudder Park, Corpus Christi, Texas, U.S.	
3	Win	3–0	Carlos Martinez Mercado	KO	1 (6)	Jun 21, 1946	City Hall Sports Arena, Laredo, Texas, U.S.	
2	Win	2–0	Reymundo Ramirez	KO	1 (4)	May 31, 1946	Corpus Christi, Texas, U.S.	
1	Win	1–0	Chino Puente	PTS	6	Apr 26, 1946	City Hall Sports Arena, Laredo, Texas, U.S.	

== Titles in boxing ==
=== Major world titles ===
- NYSAC lightweight champion (135 lbs)
- NBA (WBA) lightweight champion (135 lbs)

=== The Ring magazine titles ===
- The Ring lightweight champion (135 lbs)

=== Regional/International titles ===
- Texas State featherweight champion (126 lbs)
- California State featherweight champion (126 lbs) (2×)

=== Undisputed titles ===
- Undisputed lightweight champion

== See also ==
- Lineal championship
- List of lightweight boxing champions
- List of Mexican boxing world champions

Achievements
Preceded by Jimmy Carter	World Lightweight Champion; 14 May 1952–15 Oct 1952	Succeeded by Jimmy Carter
