= Carmen Basilio =

American boxer (1927–2012)

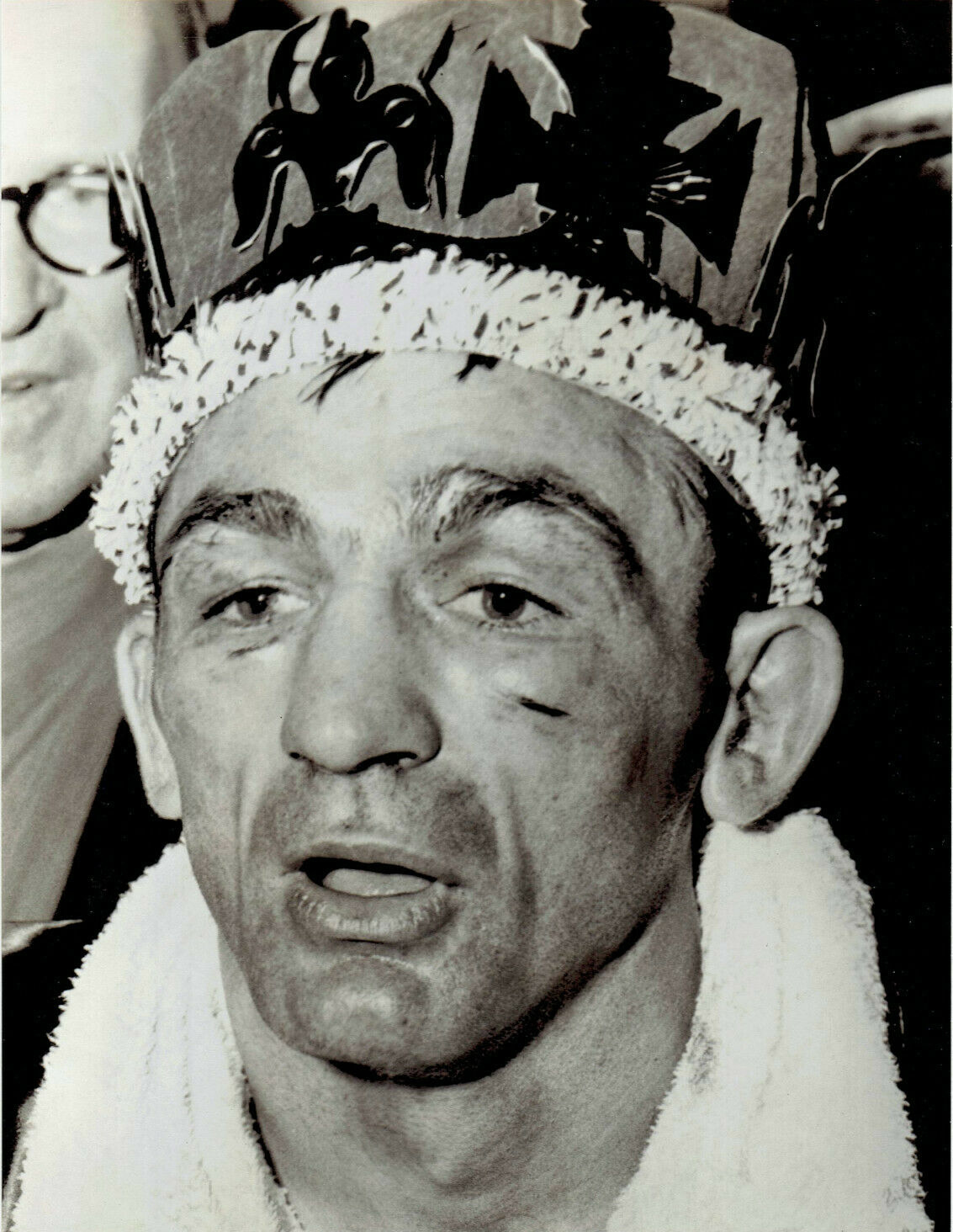
- Basilio after defending the world title in 1955

Personal information
- Nickname: The Upstate Onion Farmer
- Born: April 2, 1927 Canastota, New York, U.S.
- Died: November 7, 2012 (aged 85) Rochester, New York, U.S.
- Height: 5 ft 6 1/2 in (169 cm)
- Weight: Welterweight; Middleweight

Boxing career
- Stance: Orthodox

Boxing record
- Total fights: 79
- Wins: 56
- Win by KO: 27
- Losses: 16
- Draws: 7

Carmen Basilio (born Carmine Basilio, April 2, 1927 – November 7, 2012) was an American professional boxer who was a two-time Undisputed Welterweight Champion and Undisputed Middleweight champion, beating Sugar Ray Robinson for the latter title.

In 1957, The Ring magazine named Basilio Fighter of the Year and he won the Hickok Belt, a trophy that was awarded to the top professional athlete of the year. The Boxing Writers Association of America (BWAA) named him Fighter of the Year in 1955 and 1957. Basilio also holds the distinction of being in The Ring magazine's Fight of the Year in five consecutive years (1955–59), a feat unmatched by any other boxer.

In 2002, Basilio was voted by The Ring magazine as the 40th greatest fighter of the last 80 years. He was inducted into the International Boxing Hall of Fame in the inaugural class of 1990.

== Early life ==
Basillio was born and raised in Canastota, New York. His parents were Italian immigrants, and he was one of ten children. His family owned an onion farm where he worked during his youth, his family faced economic difficulties as many immigrant families did during the Depression-era and World War II years. This upbringing instilled in Basilio a strong sense of toughness and resilience.

After high school, Basilio enlisted in the U.S. Marine Corps during World War II. While stationed at Camp Lejeune in North Carolina, he began boxing for the Marines, competing in inter-service bouts. This military experience gave him discipline and introduced him to a structured fighting environment that would set the stage for his professional career. Then after receiving an honorable discharge and heading back home Basilio started his professional boxing career.

== Boxing career ==
=== Journeyman ===
Basilio began his professional boxing career by facing Jimmy Evans on November 24, 1948, in Binghamton, New York. He knocked Evans out in the third round, and five days later he beat Bruce Walters in only one round. By the end of 1948, he had completed four bouts.

He started 1949 with two draws, against Johnny Cunningham on January 5 and against Jay Perlin 20 days later. Basilio campaigned exclusively inside the state of New York during his first 24 bouts, going 19-3-2 during that span. His first loss was at the hands of Connie Thies, who beat him in a six-round decision on May 2, 1949. He fought Cunningham three more times during that period. Basilio won by knockout in two rounds on their second meeting, Cunningham won by a decision in eight in their third fight, and Basilio won by a decision in eight in their fourth.

In the middle of that 24-bout span, 1950 rolled over and Basilio met former world champion Lew Jenkins, winning a 10-round decision.

For fight number 25, Basilio decided that it was time to campaign outside of New York state, so he went to New Orleans, where he boxed his next six fights. In his first bout there, he met Gaby Ferland, who held him to a draw. He and Ferland later had a rematch, Basilio winning by a knockout in the first round. He also boxed Guillermo Giminez there twice, first beating him by knockout in eight and then by knockout in nine. In his last fight before returning home, he lost by a decision in 10 to Eddie Giosa.

For his next seven bouts, Basilio only went 3–3–1, but he was able to avenge his loss to Giosa by winning a ten-round decision over him in Syracuse.

In 1952, Basilio went 6–2–1. He beat Jimmy Cousins among others that year, but he lost to Chuck Davey and Billy Graham. The draw he registered that year was against Davey in the first of the two meetings that year.

=== Rise in the ranks ===
In 1953. Basilio started winning big fights and rose in the welterweight division rankings. He secured his first world title fight, against Cuba's Kid Gavilán for Gavilán's world welterweight championship.

Before fighting against Gavilan, he beat former world lightweight champion Ike Williams and had two more fights with Graham, avenging his earlier loss to Graham in the second bout between them with a 12-round decision win and drawing in the third. Basilio lost a 15-round decision to Gavilan and went for a fourth meeting with Cunningham, this time winning by a knockout in four. Then he and French fighter Pierre Langois began another rivalry with a 10-round draw in the first bout between the two.

In 1954, Basilio went undefeated in eight bouts, going 7-0-1 with 2 knockouts and defeating Langois in their rematch by decision.

=== World Champion ===
In 1955, Basilio began by beating Peter Müller by decision. After that, Basilio was once again the number one challenger, and on June 10 of that year he received his second world title try, against world welterweight champion Tony DeMarco. Basilio became world champion by knocking out DeMarco in the 12th round.

After winning the title, Basilio had two non-title bouts, including a ten-round decision win over Gil Turner, before he and DeMarco met again, this time with Basilio as the defending world champion. Their second fight had exactly the same result as their first bout: Basilio won by a knockout in 12.

For his next fight, in 1956, Basilio lost the title in Chicago to Johnny Saxton by a decision in 15. Saxton's manager, mafioso Frank "Blinky" Palermo", was later jailed along with his partner Frankie Carbo for fixing fights. Basilio said of losing his title to the referees' decision: "It was like being robbed in a dark alley." In an immediate rematch that was fought in Syracuse, Basilio regained the crown with a nine-round knockout, and then, in a rubber match, Basilio kept the belt with a knockout in two.

After that, he went up in weight and challenged ageing 36- year-old world middleweight champion Sugar Ray Robinson, in what may have been his most famous fight. He won the middleweight championship of the world by beating Robinson in a 15-round split decision on September 23, 1957. The day after, he had to abandon the welterweight belt, in accordance with boxing's then rules. In January 1958, Basilio was awarded the Hickok Belt as the top professional athlete of the year for 1957.

=== Decline ===
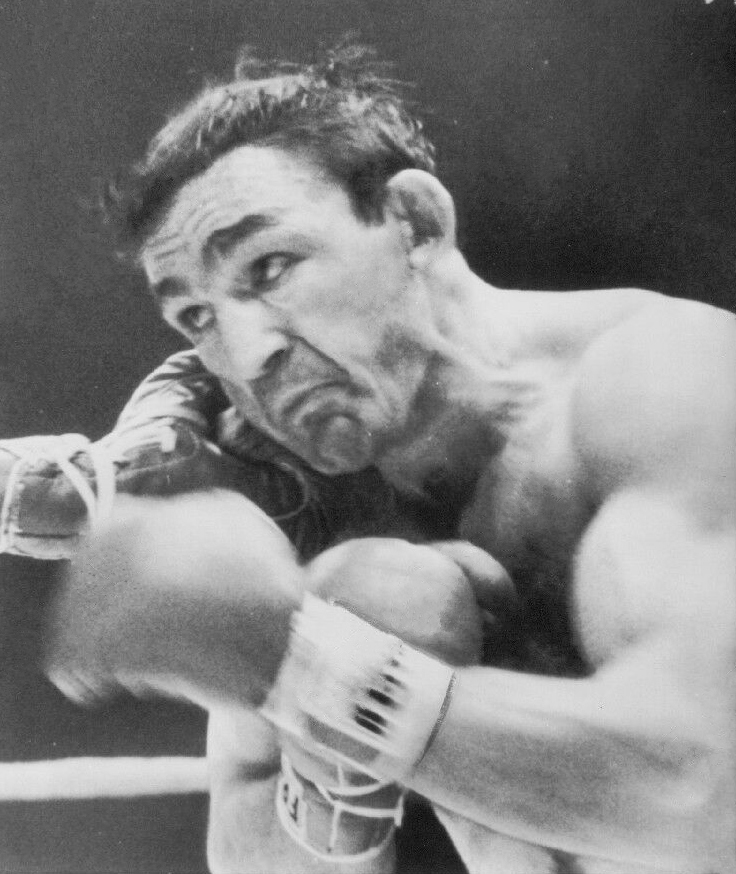
Basilio against Robinson in 1958

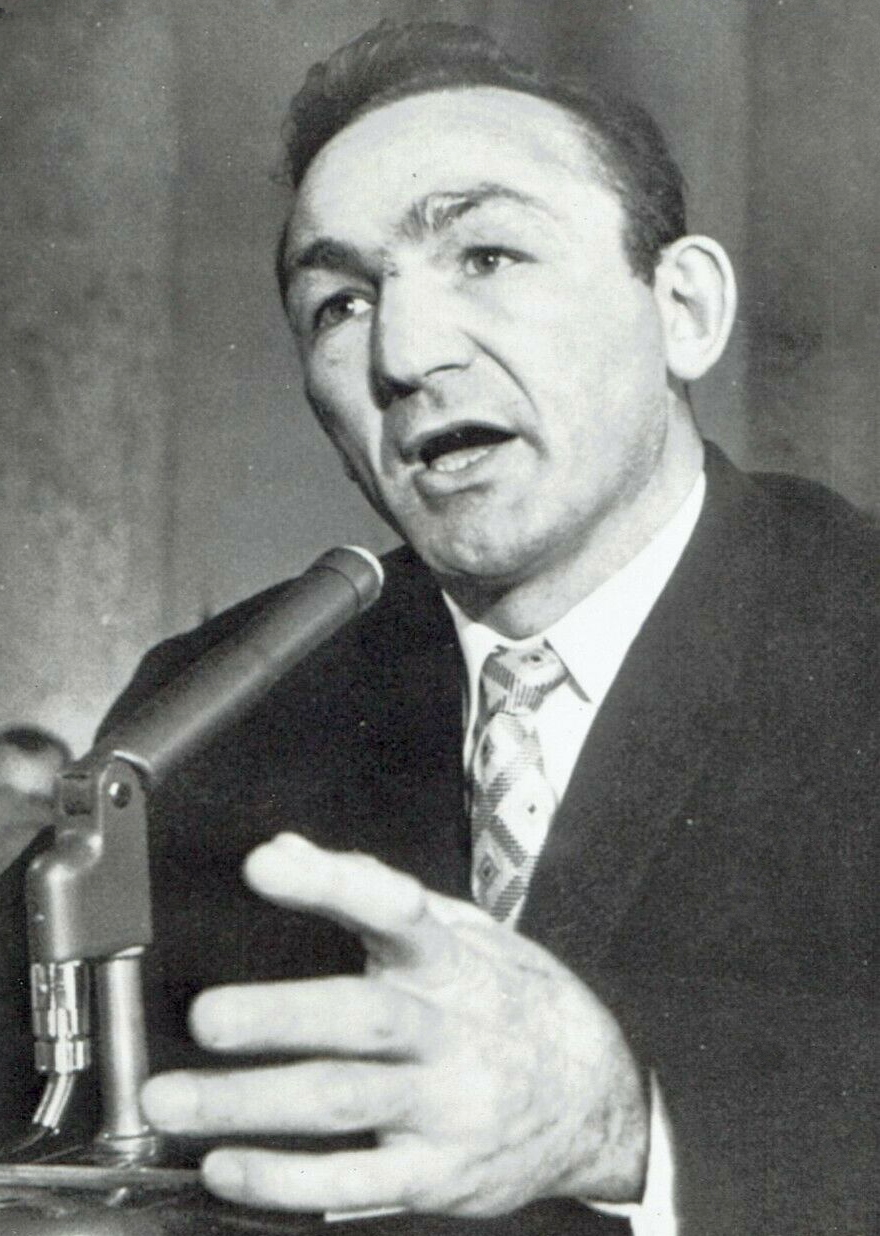
Basilio testifies to U.S. Senate about mafia in 1960

In 1958, he and Robinson met in a rematch on March 25 and Robinson barely regained the title with a controversial 15-round split decision. The judges scored 71 to 64,5 and 72 to 64 Robinson while the referee scores 66 to 69 Basilio. Although Basilio's left eye was totally swollen shut from the 6th round on, many of the ringside press thought Basilio won the fight.

From that moment, and until his retirement in 1961, he fought only sporadically, but three of his last fights were attempts to recover the world middleweight title, losing twice to Gene Fullmer: by a TKO in 14 at San Francisco and by a TKO in 12 in Fullmer's home state of Utah (in Salt Lake City), and also later, when he lost a 10-round decision to defending world champion Paul Pender.

In between those fights, he was able to beat Art Aragon, by knockout in eight and former world welterweight champion Don Jordan by decision in ten. His fight with Pender for the title was also his last fight as a professional boxer.

=== Senate Testimony ===
In 1960, Basilio testified before the United States Senate Subcommittee on Antitrust and the Monopoly during its investigation of the International Boxing Club of New York and the influence of organized crime on boxing. Basilio told the Subcommittee about Frankie Carbo and Frank "Blinky" Palmero and Carbo's aide, Gabriel Genovese, a cousin of Mafia Don Vito Genovese who was convicted in 1959 of being an unlicensed boxing manager. He called for a house cleaning of professional boxing. His testimony revealed that his former managers had to pay off organized crime for his title shots and that he essentially had a behind the scenes manager in Genovese.

Evidence submitted to the subcommittee showed that Basilio's on-the-record managers, John DeJohn and Joseph Netro, paid Carbo frontman Gabriel Genovese $39,334.41 and approximately $25,000, respectively, during the time Basilio fought for and defended his welterweight and middleweight titles.

=== Record ===
Carmen Basilio retired with a ring record of 56 wins, 16 losses and 7 draws, with 27 wins by knockout.

== Post-boxing life ==
After his retirement, Basilio worked for a time at the Genesee Brewery in Rochester, NY. Later Carmen, a high-school dropout, taught physical education at Le Moyne College in Syracuse for over 20 years. Basilio, who was also a member of the United States Marine Corps at one point in his life, was able to enjoy his retirement. Carmen was associated with a sausage company, frequently confused with a separate sausage company run by his brother Paul, for which he was a salesman.

During the 1970s, his nephew Billy Backus became world welterweight champion after having a shaky start to his own boxing career, and Basilio declared on the day that Backus became champion that, to him, Billy's winning the title was better than his winning it himself.

In 1990, Ed Brophy decided to build the International Boxing Hall of Fame in Canastota, New York, to honor the two world champions who were born there: Basilio and his nephew. Although Backus isn't a member of the Hall of Fame, Basilio is, along with many of the fighters he met inside the ring. There is also a statue in his honor located in the Hall of Fame.

In the late 1990s, Basilio became seriously ill, requiring triple bypass heart surgery. Doctors were able to repair his heart.

Even in his later life Basilio still remained active in the boxing community, he also enjoyed lighter pursuits such as doing crossword puzzles, bowling, and golf. He was also still connected with fans through autograph events, including a tour in England and Wales. He split his time between Rochester, New York, and Deltona, Florida, while frequently returning to Canastota to visit friends and the boxing Hall of Fame.

Basilio was interviewed for an HBO documentary on Sugar Ray Robinson called "The Bright Lights and Dark Shadows of a Champion". He mentioned that although he respected Robinson's talents in the ring, he did not like him as a person.

In 2010, "Title Town USA, Boxing in Upstate New York" by historian Mark Allen Baker was published by The History Press in 2010 and identifies Canastota as the epicenter of Upstate New York's rich boxing heritage. The book includes chapters on both Carmen Basilio and Billy Backus. The introduction was written by Edward P. Brophy Executive Director of the International Boxing Hall of Fame. He died aged 85 in 2012, survived by his wife Josephine Basilio and their four children.

After his death the international boxing Hall of Fame put their flag at half mass in tribute, his childhood home in Canastota has also been designated as a historic site.

After his passing Edward Brophy, executive director of the Boxing Hall of Fame stated “Carmen put Canastota on the worldwide boxing map and gave the village's residents a sense of pride that couldn't be matched anywhere in the world," "During the 1950s and 1960s Carmen was everyone's hero. They talked about him in the coffee shops, grocery stores, gas stations and barbershops all the time. And they still talk about him today. He was loved, respected and idolized. His career and memories will last forever in the Village of Canastota."

== Awards and honors ==
- 2× Sugar Ray Robinson Award: 1955, 1957
- The Ring magazine Fighter of the Year: 1957
- 5× The Ring magazine Fight of the Year: 1955 vs. Tony DeMarco II, 1956 vs. Johnny Saxton II, 1957 vs. Sugar Ray Robinson I, 1958 vs. Sugar Ray Robinson II, 1959 vs. Gene Fullmer I
- Awarded the Hickok Belt as America's top athlete in 1957
- Inducted into the National Italian American Sports Hall of Fame in 1977
- Inducted as an inaugural member of the Greater Syracuse Sports Hall of Fame 1987
- Inaugural member of the International Boxing Hall of Fame in 1990
- Inducted into the Le Moyne athletics Hall of Fame in 1991 (honorary member)
- Inducted into the United States Marine Corps Sports Hall of Fame in 2002
- Cauliflower Alley Club
  - Boxing Honoree (1994)

== Professional boxing record ==
79 fights	56 wins	16 losses
By knockout	27	2
By decision	29	14
Draws	7	

No.	Result	Record	Opponent	Type	Round	Date	Location	Notes
79	Loss	56–16–7	Paul Pender	UD	15	April 22, 1961	Boston Garden, Boston, Massachusetts, U.S.	For NYSAC and The Ring middleweight titles
78	Win	56–15–7	Don Jordan	UD	10	March 11, 1961	War Memorial Auditorium, Syracuse, New York, U.S.	
77	Win	55–15–7	Gaspar Ortega	UD	10	January 7, 1961	Madison Square Garden, New York City, New York, U.S.	
76	Loss	54–15–7	Gene Fullmer	TKO	12 (15)	June 29, 1960	Derks Field, Salt Lake City, Utah, U.S.	For NBA middleweight title
75	Loss	54–14–7	Gene Fullmer	TKO	14 (15)	August 28, 1959	Cow Palace, Daly City, California, U.S.	For vacant NBA middleweight title
74	Win	54–13–7	Arley Seifer	TKO	3 (10)	April 1, 1959	Bell Auditorium, Augusta, Georgia, U.S.	
73	Win	53–13–7	Art Aragon	TKO	8 (10)	September 5, 1958	Wrigley Field, Los Angeles, California, U.S.	
72	Loss	52–13–7	Sugar Ray Robinson	SD	15	March 25, 1958	Chicago Stadium, Chicago, Illinois, U.S.	Lost NBA, NYSAC, and The Ring middleweight titles
71	Win	52–12–7	Sugar Ray Robinson	SD	15	September 23, 1957	Yankee Stadium, New York City, New York, U.S.	Won NBA, NYSAC, and The Ring middleweight titles
70	Win	51–12–7	Harold Jones	TKO	4 (10)	May 16, 1957	Auditorium, Portland, Oregon, U.S.	
69	Win	50–12–7	Johnny Saxton	TKO	2 (15)	February 22, 1957	Arena, Cleveland, Ohio, U.S.	Retained NBA, NYSAC, and The Ring welterweight titles
68	Win	49–12–7	Johnny Saxton	TKO	9 (15)	September 12, 1956	War Memorial Auditorium, Syracuse, New York, U.S.	Won NBA, NYSAC, and The Ring welterweight titles
67	Loss	48–12–7	Johnny Saxton	UD	15	March 14, 1956	Chicago Stadium, Chicago, Illinois, U.S.	Lost NBA, NYSAC, and The Ring welterweight titles
66	Win	48–11–7	Tony DeMarco	TKO	12 (15)	November 30, 1955	Boston Garden, Boston, Massachusetts, U.S.	Retained NBA, NYSAC, and The Ring welterweight titles
65	Win	47–11–7	Gil Turner	MD	10	September 7, 1955	War Memorial Auditorium, Syracuse, New York, U.S.	
64	Win	46–11–7	Italo Scortichini	UD	10	August 10, 1955	Madison Square Garden, New York City, New York, U.S.	
63	Win	45–11–7	Tony DeMarco	TKO	12 (15)	June 10, 1955	War Memorial Auditorium, Syracuse, New York, U.S.	Won NBA, NYSAC, and The Ring welterweight titles
62	Win	44–11–7	Peter Müller	UD	10	January 21, 1955	War Memorial Auditorium, Syracuse, New York, U.S.	
61	Win	43–11–7	Ronnie Harper	RTD	3 (10)	December 16, 1954	Armory, Akron, Ohio, U.S.	
60	Win	42–11–7	Allie Gronik	UD	10	October 15, 1954	War Memorial Auditorium, Syracuse, New York, U.S.	
59	Win	41–11–7	Carmine Fiore	UD	10	September 10, 1954	Madison Square Garden, New York City, New York, U.S.	
58	Win	40–11–7	Ronnie Harper	TKO	2 (10)	August 17, 1954	Fort Wayne, Indiana, U.S.	
57	Win	39–11–7	Al Andrews	UD	10	June 26, 1954	War Memorial Auditorium, Syracuse, New York, U.S.	
56	Win	38–11–7	Italo Scortichini	UD	10	May 15, 1954	War Memorial Auditorium, Syracuse, New York, U.S.	
55	Win	37–11–7	Pierre Langlois	UD	10	April 17, 1954	War Memorial Auditorium, Syracuse, New York, U.S.	
54	Draw	36–11–7	Italo Scortichini	PTS	10	January 16, 1954	Dinner Key Auditorium, Coconut Grove, Florida, U.S.	
53	Draw	36–11–6	Pierre Langlois	PTS	10	December 19, 1953	War Memorial Auditorium, Syracuse, New York, U.S.	
52	Win	36–11–5	Johnny Cunningham	KO	4 (10)	November 28, 1953	Civic Auditorium, Toledo, Ohio, U.S.	
51	Loss	35–11–5	Kid Gavilan	SD	15	September 18, 1953	War Memorial Auditorium, Syracuse, New York, U.S.	For NBA, NYSAC, and The Ring welterweight titles
50	Draw	35–10–5	Billy Graham	PTS	12	July 25, 1953	War Memorial Auditorium, Syracuse, New York, U.S.	Retained USA New York State welterweight title
49	Win	35–10–4	Billy Graham	UD	12	June 6, 1953	Memorial Stadium, Syracuse, New York, U.S.	Won inaugural USA New York State welterweight title
48	Win	34–10–4	Carmine Fiore	TKO	9 (10)	April 11, 1953	War Memorial Auditorium, Syracuse, New York, U.S.	
47	Win	33–10–4	Vic Cardell	UD	10	February 28, 1953	Sports Arena, Toledo, Ohio, U.S.	
46	Win	32–10–4	Ike Williams	UD	10	January 12, 1953	War Memorial Auditorium, Syracuse, New York, U.S.	
45	Win	31–10–4	Chuck Foster	TKO	5 (10)	November 18, 1952	Memorial Auditorium, Buffalo, New York, U.S.	
44	Win	30–10–4	Sammy Giuliani	KO	3 (10)	October 20, 1952	War Memorial Auditorium, Syracuse, New York, U.S.	
43	Win	29–10–4	Baby Williams	UD	10	September 22, 1952	Auditorium, Miami Beach, Florida, U.S.	
42	Loss	28–10–4	Billy Graham	UD	10	August 20, 1952	Chicago Stadium, Chicago, Illinois, U.S.	
41	Loss	28–9–4	Chuck Davey	UD	10	July 16, 1952	Chicago Stadium, Chicago, Illinois, U.S.	
40	Draw	28–8–4	Chuck Davey	PTS	10	May 29, 1952	War Memorial Auditorium, Syracuse, New York, U.S.	
39	Win	28–8–3	Jackie O'Brien	MD	10	March 31, 1952	South Main Street Armory, Wilkes-Barre, Pennsylvania, U.S.	
38	Win	27–8–3	Jimmy Cousins	UD	8	February 28, 1952	Armory, Akron, Ohio, U.S.	
37	Win	26–8–3	Emmett Norris	UD	10	February 4, 1952	South Main Street Armory, Wilkes-Barre, Pennsylvania, U.S.	
36	Loss	25–8–3	Ross Virgo	UD	10	September 26, 1951	Municipal Auditorium, New Orleans, Louisiana, U.S.	
35	Win	25–7–3	Shamus McCray	PTS	8	September 17, 1951	War Memorial Auditorium, Syracuse, New York, U.S.	
34	Loss	24–7–3	Johnny Cesario	UD	10	June 18, 1951	McConnell Field, Utica, New York, U.S.	
33	Loss	24–6–3	Lester Felton	UD	10	May 29, 1951	State Fair Coliseum, Syracuse, New York, U.S.	
32	Win	24–5–3	Eddie Giosa	UD	10	April 12, 1951	State Fair Coliseum, Syracuse, New York, U.S.	
31	Win	23–5–3	Floro Hita	PTS	8	March 9, 1951	State Fair Coliseum, Syracuse, New York, U.S.	
30	Loss	22–5–3	Vic Cardell	SD	10	December 15, 1950	Madison Square Garden, New York City, New York, U.S.	
29	Loss	22–4–3	Eddie Giosa	PTS	10	August 28, 1950	Municipal Auditorium, New Orleans, Louisiana, U.S.	
28	Win	22–3–3	Guillermo Gimenez	RTD	8 (10)	July 31, 1950	Coliseum Arena, New Orleans, Louisiana, U.S.	
27	Win	21–3–3	Guillermo Gimenez	RTD	7 (10)	June 21, 1950	Municipal Auditorium, New Orleans, Louisiana, U.S.	
26	Win	20–3–3	Gaby Ferland	KO	1 (10)	May 5, 1950	Coliseum Arena, New Orleans, Louisiana, U.S.	
25	Draw	19–3–3	Gaby Ferland	PTS	10	April 12, 1950	Coliseum Arena, New Orleans, Louisiana, U.S.	
24	Loss	19–3–2	Mike Koballa	UD	8	March 27, 1950	Eastern Parkway Arena, New York City, New York, U.S.	
23	Win	19–2–2	Lew Jenkins	MD	10	March 6, 1950	State Fair Coliseum, Syracuse, New York, U.S.	
22	Win	18–2–2	Adrien Mourguiart	TKO	7 (10)	February 7, 1950	Memorial Auditorium, Buffalo, New York, U.S.	
21	Win	17–2–2	Cassell Tate	MD	8	January 24, 1950	Memorial Auditorium, Buffalo, New York, U.S.	
20	Win	16–2–2	Sonny Jim Hampton	UD	8	January 10, 1950	Memorial Auditorium, Buffalo, New York, U.S.	
19	Win	15–2–2	Johnny Parker	RTD	2 (8)	September 30, 1949	State Fair Coliseum, Syracuse, New York, U.S.	
18	Win	14–2–2	Tony DiPelino	UD	8	September 7, 1949	Red Wing Stadium, Rochester, New York, U.S.	
17	Win	13–2–2	Johnny Cunningham	PTS	8	August 17, 1949	MacArthur Stadium, Syracuse, New York, U.S.	
16	Loss	12–2–2	Johnny Cunningham	SD	8	August 2, 1949	Bennett's Field, Utica, New York, U.S.	
15	Win	12–1–2	Sammy Daniels	UD	8	July 21, 1949	Bennett's Field, Utica, New York, U.S.	
14	Win	11–1–2	Jesse Bradshaw	TKO	2 (6)	July 12, 1949	MacArthur Stadium, Syracuse, New York, U.S.	
13	Win	10–1–2	Johnny Cunningham	KO	2 (6)	June 7, 1949	MacArthur Stadium, Syracuse, New York, U.S.	
12	Win	9–1–2	Johnny Clemons	KO	3 (6)	May 18, 1949	State Fair Coliseum, Syracuse, New York, U.S.	
11	Loss	8–1–2	Connie Thies	PTS	6	May 2, 1949	Sports Arena, Rochester, New York, U.S.	
10	Win	8–0–2	Elliot Throop	KO	1 (6)	April 20, 1949	State Fair Coliseum, Syracuse, New York, U.S.	
9	Win	7–0–2	Jerry Drain	TKO	3 (6)	March 18, 1949	State Fair Coliseum, Syracuse, New York, U.S.	
8	Win	6–0–2	Luke Jordan	PTS	6	February 17, 1949	Sports Arena, Rochester, New York, U.S.	
7	Win	5–0–2	Ernie Hall	KO	2 (6)	January 25, 1949	State Fair Coliseum, Syracuse, New York, U.S.	
6	Draw	4–0–2	Jimmy Parlin	PTS	6	January 19, 1949	Kalurah Temple, Binghamton, New York, U.S.	
5	Draw	4–0–1	Johnny Cunningham	PTS	6	January 5, 1949	Kalurah Temple, Binghamton, New York, U.S.	
4	Win	4–0	Rolly Johns	SD	6	December 15, 1948	State Fair Coliseum, Syracuse, New York, U.S.	
3	Win	3–0	Eddie Thomas	KO	2 (6)	December 8, 1948	Kalurah Temple, Binghamton, New York, U.S.	
2	Win	2–0	Bruce Walters	KO	1 (4)	November 29, 1948	State Fair Coliseum, Syracuse, New York, U.S.	
1	Win	1–0	Jimmy Evans	KO	3 (4)	November 24, 1948	Kalurah Temple, Binghamton, New York, U.S.	

== Titles in boxing ==
=== Major world titles ===
- NYSAC welterweight champion (147 lbs) (2×)
- NBA (WBA) welterweight champion (147 lbs) (2×)
- NYSAC middleweight champion (160 lbs)
- NBA (WBA) middleweight champion (160 lbs)

=== The Ring magazine titles ===
- The Ring welterweight champion (147 lbs) (2×)
- The Ring middleweight champion (160 lbs)

=== Regional/International titles ===
- New York State welterweight champion (147 lbs)

=== Undisputed titles ===
- Undisputed welterweight champion (2×)
- Undisputed middleweight champion

== See also ==
- List of welterweight boxing champions
- List of middleweight boxing champions
- List of left-handed boxers

Sporting positions
World boxing titles
Preceded by Tony DeMarco	NYSAC welterweight champion June 10, 1955 – March 14, 1956	Succeeded by Johnny Saxton
Preceded by Tony DeMarco	NBA welterweight champion June 10, 1955 – March 14, 1956	Succeeded by Johnny Saxton
Preceded by Tony DeMarco	The Ring welterweight champion June 10, 1955 – March 14, 1956	Succeeded by Johnny Saxton
Preceded by Tony DeMarco	Undisputed welterweight champion June 10, 1955 – March 14, 1956	Succeeded by Johnny Saxton
Preceded by Johnny Saxton	NYSAC welterweight champion September 12, 1956 – September 23, 1957; Vacated	Vacant Title next held by Virgil Akins
Preceded by Johnny Saxton	NBA welterweight champion September 12, 1956 – September 23, 1957; Vacated	Vacant Title next held by Virgil Akins
Preceded by Johnny Saxton	The Ring welterweight champion September 12, 1956 – September 23, 1957; Vacated	Vacant Title next held by Virgil Akins
Preceded by Johnny Saxton	Undisputed welterweight champion September 12, 1956 – September 23, 1957; Vacated	Vacant Title next held by Virgil Akins
Preceded by Sugar Ray Robinson	NYSAC middleweight champion September 23, 1957 – March 25, 1958	Succeeded by Sugar Ray Robinson
Preceded by Sugar Ray Robinson	NBA middleweight champion September 23, 1957 – March 25, 1958	Succeeded by Sugar Ray Robinson
Preceded by Sugar Ray Robinson	The Ring middleweight champion September 23, 1957 – March 25, 1958	Succeeded by Sugar Ray Robinson
Preceded by Sugar Ray Robinson	Undisputed middleweight champion September 23, 1957 – March 25, 1958	Succeeded by Sugar Ray Robinson
