= Billy Graham (American boxer) =

American boxer (1922–1992)

Personal information
- Nickname: The Uncrowned Welterweight Champion of the World
- Born: William Walter Graham Jr. September 9, 1922 Manhattan, New York, U.S.
- Died: January 22, 1992 (aged 69) West Islip, New York, U.S.
- Height: 5 ft 8 in (173 cm)
- Weight: Welterweight
- Spouse: Lorraine Hansen (m. 1948)
- Children: 4

Boxing career
- Stance: Orthodox

Boxing record
- Total fights: 126
- Wins: 102
- Win by KO: 27
- Losses: 15
- Draws: 9

Billy Graham (September 9, 1922 – January 22, 1992) was an American boxer from New York City who had a professional record of 102 wins and 15 losses. Though a leading lightweight contender, Graham was never the recipient of a world title. Graham did however, have the remarkable distinction of never having been knocked off his feet in his long career. He was elected into the World Boxing Hall of Fame in 1987, and is also in the International Boxing Hall of Fame.

== Early life and career ==
Graham was born in the Murray Hill neighborhood of Manhattan on September 9, 1922. Billy's father operated a candy store on Second Avenue between East 35th and 36th streets, which later became a bar after the end of Prohibition and moved to the corner of Second Avenue and East 36th Street. (Note: The candy store also sold sporting goods, including boxing gloves.) (Note: Billy's father was a fan of Jimmy McLarnin; he gave Billy and his brother Robbie boxing gloves which they used to face off against each other in a room in the back of the candy store.) His early life centered on the neighborhood surrounding his father's saloon, which included St. Gabriel Church and St. Gabriel's Park.

At the age of ten, Billy began learning how to box at the Catholic Boys' Club, which was a converted tenement on East 37th Street between First and Second avenues and included a gym on the top floor. He later boxed for the Madison Square Boys' Club. Graham defeated Walker Smith Jr. (Sugar Ray Robinson) in a three-round decision at Greenwich House in the West Village for the Boys' Club Athletic League championship when they were both amateurs in New York City. At the time, Graham was thirteen years old and both kids weighted about 90 pounds (41 kg). Years later, after Robinson had become a boxing legend, Graham saw him and reminded him of their fight. Robinson smiled and responded, "Lots of people beat Sugar Ray Robinson. But you're the only man who ever beat Walker Smith." Graham went on to compile a record of 80–2 as an amateur boxer.

Graham left high school after two years and decided he wanted to be a fighter. He was turned down for the Golden Gloves four times due to a heart murmur. Graham spent three months working as a stock boy at the Lord & Taylor department store before becoming a professional boxer.

Graham temporarily paused his boxing career during World War II, serving in the United States Coast Guard along with fellow boxers Johnny Colan and Artie Tedesco. He resumed fighting in April 1944.

Graham met his future wife through her father, who was a regular customer at his father's bar on Second Avenue. Graham and Lorraine Hansen were engaged in February 1948 and the couple got married later that same year. They had four children.

== Boxing career ==
He was undefeated in his first 58 fights, going 52–0–6, until he fought Tony Pellone, where he lost by a split decision.

Graham was known as a welterweight with stylish and subtle moves that made him a difficult target in the ring. He fought the legendary Kid Gavilán (commonly spelled Kid Gavilan) four times. In the first fight, held at Madison Square Garden, he beat Gavilan by a split decision. In the second fight, he lost at Madison Square Garden by a medical decision. The third fight was for the National Boxing Association World welterweight title and was again held at Madison Square Garden; this time, Gavilan won by a split decision. The final fight was for the World Welterweight Title in Havana, Cuba at Stadium Ball Park; Gavilan was again the victor, winning in a unanimous decision.

In a 2002 interview with The Observer, Budd Schulberg talked about mob involvement in boxing in the 1950s and how Gavilan both won and lost the welterweight championship due to mob interference.

"...Frankie Carbo, the mob's unofficial commissioner for boxing, controlled a lot of the welters and middles.... Not every fight was fixed, of course, but from time to time Carbo and his lieutenants, like Blinky Palermo in Philadelphia, would put the fix in. When the Kid Gavilan-Johnny Saxton fight was won by Saxton on a decision in Philadelphia in 1954, I was covering it for Sports Illustrated and wrote a piece at that time saying boxing was a dirty business and must be cleaned up now. It was an open secret. All the press knew that one - and other fights - were fixed. Gavilan was a mob-controlled fighter, too, and when he fought Billy Graham it was clear Graham had been robbed of the title. The decision would be bought. If it was close, the judges would shade it the way they had been told."

Graham's controversial loss to Gavilan in 1951 earned him the nickname "The Uncrowned Welterweight Champion of the World". Matchmaker Teddy Brenner commented, "If a fighter ever won a fight, Graham won that fight. It ranks among the worst decisions I've ever seen." The decision was reviewed by the New York State Athletic Commission in 1985, but was not overturned.

Billy Graham also fought Carmen Basilio three times in his career. The first fight was held at Chicago Stadium; Graham won by a unanimous decision. Basilio won the second fight, held for the New York State Welterweight Title at Memorial Stadium in Syracuse, by a unanimous decision. The third and final fight was deemed a draw; Basilio kept his New York State Welterweight Title.

== Life after boxing ==
After retiring from boxing, Graham moved to West Islip, New York in 1955. He spent 35 years working as a representative for liquor companies, including 25 years for Seagram's. Graham also worked as a boxing judge and referee.

While employed by National Distillers, Graham made a guest appearance as an imposter for a police officer on the August 18, 1960 episode of the CBS game show To Tell the Truth. He fooled the panel into thinking he was the officer, garnering two of the four possible votes from Kitty Carlisle and Jim Fleming. After all the votes were cast, Tom Poston recognized Graham's true identity. Graham had also appeared on CBS' Name That Tune game show on April 23, 1957, when he won a jackpot of $25,000 along with a 14-year-old contestant. On May 27, 1957, Graham met the evangelist Billy Graham at Madison Square Garden and presented him with a recording of a semi-religious song he had helped write called The Man.

W. C. Heinz's 1958 novel The Professional was written about a sportswriter covering a boxer training for a fight, and the character of middleweight Eddie Brown was based on Billy Graham.

Graham died of cancer at his home in West Islip on January 22, 1992.

== Professional boxing record ==
126 fights	102 wins	15 losses
By knockout	27	0
By decision	75	15
Draws	9	

No.	Result	Record	Opponent	Type	Round, time	Date	Location	Notes
126	Loss	102–15–9	Chico Vejar	UD	10	Apr 1, 1955	War Memorial Auditorium, Syracuse, New York, US	
125	Loss	102–14–9	Chico Vejar	SD	10	Mar 4, 1955	Madison Square Garden, New York City, New York, US	
124	Loss	102–13–9	Ramon Fuentes	UD	10	Oct 21, 1954	Olympic Auditorium, Los Angeles, California, US	
123	Loss	102–12–9	Christian Christensen	SD	10	Jul 19, 1954	Eastern Parkway Arena, New York City, New York, US	
122	Win	102–11–9	Charlie Simmons	TKO	6 (8)	Jun 10, 1954	Candlewood Arena, Danbury, Connecticut, US	
121	Win	101–11–9	Paddy Young	UD	10	Dec 18, 1953	Madison Square Garden, New York City, New York, US	
120	Draw	100–11–9	Carmen Basilio	SD	12	Jul 25, 1953	War Memorial Auditorium, Syracuse, New York, US	For USA New York State welterweight title
119	Loss	100–11–8	Carmen Basilio	UD	12	Jun 6, 1953	Memorial Stadium, Syracuse, New York, US	For inaugural USA New York State welterweight title
118	Win	100–10–8	Joey Giardello	UD	12	Mar 6, 1953	Madison Square Garden, New York City, New York, US	
117	Win	99–10–8	Art Aragon	UD	10	Jan 29, 1953	Olympic Auditorium, Los Angeles, California, US	
116	Loss	98–10–8	Joey Giardello	SD	10	Dec 19, 1952	Madison Square Garden, New York City, New York, US	
115	Loss	98–9–8	Kid Gavilán	UD	15	Oct 5, 1952	Gran Estadio de La Habana, Havana, Cuba	For NYSAC, NBA, and The Ring welterweight titles
114	Win	98–8–8	Carmen Basilio	UD	10	Aug 20, 1952	Chicago Stadium, Chicago, Illinois, US	
113	Loss	97–8–8	Joey Giardello	SD	10	Aug 4, 1952	Eastern Parkway Arena, New York City, New York, US	
112	Draw	97–7–8	Rocky Castellani	SD	10	May 16, 1952	Madison Square Garden, New York City, New York, US	
111	Win	97–7–7	Art Soto	UD	10	Apr 14, 1952	Winterland Arena, San Francisco, California, US	
110	Win	96–7–7	Mike Gillo	UD	10	Mar 24, 1952	Valley Arena, Holyoke, Massachusetts, US	
109	Win	95–7–7	Jimmy Herring	UD	10	Feb 15, 1952	Madison Square Garden, New York City, New York, US	
108	Win	94–7–7	Danny Stepanovich	UD	10	Nov 27, 1951	Music Hall Arena, Cincinnati, Ohio, US	
107	Win	93–7–7	Johnny Cesario	SD	10	Nov 1, 1951	Memorial Auditorium, Canton, Ohio, US	
106	Win	92–7–7	Jimmy Brown	KO	4 (10), 1:16	Oct 22, 1951	Valley Arena, Holyoke, Massachusetts, US	
105	Draw	91–7–7	Mario Trigo	SD	10	Oct 8, 1951	Arena, Milwaukee, Wisconsin, US	
104	Loss	91–7–6	Kid Gavilán	SD	15	Aug 29, 1951	Madison Square Garden, New York City, New York, US	For NYSAC, NBA, and The Ring welterweight titles
103	Win	91–6–6	Billy Jenkins	UD	8	Aug 2, 1951	Meadowbrook Arena, North Adams, Massachusetts, US	
102	Win	90–6–6	Tommy Ciarlo	UD	8	Dec 19, 1950	Westchester County Center, White Plains, New York, US	
101	Loss	89–6–6	Kid Gavilán	MD	10	Nov 17, 1950	Madison Square Garden, New York City, New York, US	
100	Win	89–5–6	Auguste 'Kid' Dussart	UD	10	Oct 24, 1950	Sports Arena, Toledo, Ohio, US	
99	Win	88–5–6	Sammy Mastrean	TKO	7 (10), 1:59	Aug 14, 1950	Coney Island Velodrome, New York City, New York, US	
98	Win	87–5–6	Tommy Bazzano	PTS	10	Jul 14, 1950	Long Beach Stadium, Long Beach, New York, US	
97	Win	86–5–6	Jimmy Sanders	UD	10	Apr 18, 1950	Arena, Cleveland, Ohio, US	
96	Win	85–5–6	Phil Burton	SD	10	Apr 14, 1950	South Main Street Armory, Wilkes-Barre, Pennsylvania, US	
95	Win	84–5–6	Kid Gavilán	SD	10	Feb 10, 1950	Madison Square Garden, New York City, New York, US	
94	Win	83–5–6	Tony Pellone	SD	10	Jan 18, 1950	St. Nicholas Arena, New York City, New York, US	
93	Win	82–5–6	Tony LaBua	UD	10	Nov 23, 1949	St. Nicholas Arena, New York City, New York, US	
92	Win	81–5–6	Jean Walzack	UD	10	Oct 19, 1949	St. Nicholas Arena, New York City, New York, US	
91	Win	80–5–6	Jimmy Cox	TKO	3 (10), 1:59	Sep 19, 1949	Coliseum, Coral Gables, Florida, US	
90	Win	79–5–6	Jimmy Sanders	UD	10	Jul 8, 1949	Long Beach Stadium, Long Beach, New York, US	
89	Win	78–5–6	Sonny Jim Hampton	UD	10	Jun 23, 1949	Artillery Park, Wilkes-Barre, Pennsylvania, US	
88	Win	77–5–6	Mike Koballa	UD	8	Apr 9, 1949	Ridgewood Grove, New York City, New York, US	
87	Loss	76–5–6	Paddy DeMarco	UD	10	Mar 4, 1949	Madison Square Garden, New York City, New York, US	
86	Loss	76–4–6	Eddie Thomas	PTS	10	Feb 7, 1949	Harringay Arena, Harringay, London, England	
85	Win	76–3–6	Fitzie Pruden	UD	10	Jan 26, 1949	Manhattan Center, New York City, New York, US	
84	Win	75–3–6	Billy Lee	PTS	8	Dec 13, 1948	Laurel Garden, Newark, New Jersey, US	
83	Win	74–3–6	Joe Lucignano	UD	8	Dec 2, 1948	Sunnyside Garden, New York City, New York, US	
82	Win	73–3–6	Terry Young	UD	10	Aug 26, 1948	Madison Square Garden, New York City, New York, US	
81	Win	72–3–6	Maxie Starr	PTS	8	Jul 16, 1948	Long Beach Stadium, Long Beach, New York, US	
80	Win	71–3–6	Patsy Brandino	PTS	8	Jun 21, 1948	Croke Park, New York City, New York, US	
79	Win	70–3–6	Patsy Brandino	UD	10	Feb 2, 1948	Eastern Parkway Arena, New York City, New York, US	
78	Win	69–3–6	Jimmy Joyce	TKO	5 (10)	Jan 20, 1948	Park Arena, New York City, New York, US	
77	Win	68–3–6	Rocco Rossano	SD	10	Nov 21, 1947	St. Nicholas Arena, New York City, New York, US	
76	Win	67–3–6	Willie Beltram	UD	10	Oct 24, 1947	St. Nicholas Arena, New York City, New York, US	
75	Win	66–3–6	Patsy Giordano	PTS	10	Oct 13, 1947	Edgerton Park Arena, Rochester, New York, US	
74	Win	65–3–6	Billy Seep	KO	2 (10)	Sep 12, 1947	Mechanics Hall, Worcester, Massachusetts, US	
73	Win	64–3–6	Aldo Minelli	PTS	10	Jun 2, 1947	Queensboro Arena, New York City, New York, US	
72	Win	63–3–6	Ernie Petrone	UD	8	May 27, 1947	Sunnyside Garden, New York City, New York, US	
71	Loss	62–3–6	Tippy Larkin	UD	10	Mar 21, 1947	Madison Square Garden, New York City, New York, US	
70	Win	62–2–6	Ruby Kessler	UD	10	Jan 17, 1947	Madison Square Garden, New York City, New York, US	
69	Win	61–2–6	Doll Rafferty	UD	10	Oct 25, 1946	St. Nicholas Arena, New York City, New York, US	
68	Win	60–2–6	Cleo Shans	SD	10	Oct 15, 1946	Broadway Arena, New York City, New York, US	
67	Loss	59–2–6	Tony Pellone	SD	10	Aug 30, 1946	Madison Square Garden, New York City, New York, US	
66	Win	59–1–6	Vic Costa	PTS	8	Aug 20, 1946	MacArthur Stadium, New York City, New York, US	
65	Win	58–1–6	Jimmy Joyce	UD	10	May 20, 1946	Coliseum, Baltimore, Maryland, US	
64	Win	57–1–6	Frankie Carto	KO	9 (10), 0:58	May 13, 1946	Jamaica Arena, New York City, New York, US	
63	Win	56–1–6	Pedro Biesca	UD	8	May 8, 1946	Jamaica Arena, New York City, New York, US	
62	Win	55–1–6	Pat Scanlon	TKO	5 (10), 3:00	Apr 15, 1946	St. Nicholas Arena, New York City, New York, US	
61	Win	54–1–6	Charley Milan	SD	10	Mar 25, 1946	Coliseum, Baltimore, Maryland, US	
60	Win	53–1–6	Charley Cabey Lewis	UD	10	Oct 8, 1945	St. Nicholas Arena, New York City, New York, US	
59	Loss	52–1–6	Tony Pellone	SD	10	Sep 11, 1945	Queensboro Arena, New York City, New York, US	
58	Win	52–0–6	Donnie Maes	TKO	1 (8), 2:19	Aug 27, 1945	Queensboro Arena, New York City, New York, US	
57	Win	51–0–6	Johnny Rinaldi	TKO	4 (8), 1:15	Aug 13, 1945	Queensboro Arena, New York City, New York, US	
56	Win	50–0–6	Joey Manfro	PTS	6	May 25, 1945	Madison Square Garden, New York City, New York, US	
55	Win	49–0–6	Johnny Williams	PTS	8	Apr 21, 1945	Ridgewood Grove, New York City, New York, US	
54	Win	48–0–6	Jeff Holloway	PTS	8	Mar 31, 1945	Ridgewood Grove, New York City, New York, US	
53	Win	47–0–6	Herbert Solomon	PTS	6	Mar 17, 1945	Ridgewood Grove, New York City, New York, US	
52	Win	46–0–6	Tommy Mills	PTS	6	Mar 5, 1945	St. Nicholas Arena, New York City, New York, US	
51	Win	45–0–6	Jackie Connors	TKO	6 (8), 2:42	Jul 21, 1944	Municipal Stadium, Long Branch, New Jersey, US	
50	Win	44–0–6	Julian Malavez	PTS	6	Jul 17, 1944	Meadowbrook Bowl, Newark, New Jersey, US	
49	Win	43–0–6	Jimmy Pierce	PTS	6	Jul 10, 1944	Queensboro Arena, New York City, New York, US	
48	Win	42–0–6	Johnny Williams	KO	4 (6), 0:29	Jun 28, 1944	Twin City Bowl, Elizabeth, New Jersey, US	
47	Win	41–0–6	George Johnson	TKO	5 (6)	Jun 26, 1944	Queensboro Arena, New York City, New York, US	
46	Win	40–0–6	Doug Carter	PTS	6	May 31, 1944	Twin City Bowl, Elizabeth, New Jersey, US	
45	Win	39–0–6	Sammy Mammone	PTS	6	May 10, 1944	Scott Hall, Elizabeth, New Jersey, US	
44	Win	38–0–6	Sammy Mammone	PTS	6	May 4, 1944	Masonic Hall, Highland Park, New Jersey, US	
43	Win	37–0–6	Jackie Smallwood	KO	1 (6), 2:11	Apr 19, 1944	Scott Hall, Elizabeth, New Jersey, US	
42	Win	36–0–6	Prudencio Pacheco	PTS	6	Apr 13, 1944	Masonic Hall, Highland Park, New Jersey, US	First fight after service in US Coast Guard during World War II
41	Draw	35–0–6	Joey Varoff	PTS	6	Nov 13, 1942	Madison Square Garden, New York City, New York, US	
40	Win	35–0–5	Lew Maxwell	PTS	6	Nov 5, 1942	Grotto Auditorium, Jersey City, New Jersey, US	
39	Win	34–0–5	Mickey LaRosa	TKO	5 (6)	Oct 27, 1942	Broadway Arena, New York City, New York, US	
38	Win	33–0–5	Thaddeus Caby	KO	3 (6), 2:58	Oct 15, 1942	Scott Hall, Elizabeth, New Jersey, US	
37	Win	32–0–5	Johnny Rudd	TKO	2 (6)	Oct 12, 1942	St. Nicholas Arena, New York City, New York, US	
36	Win	31–0–5	Julian Malavez	PTS	6	Sep 19, 1942	Ridgewood Grove, New York City, New York, US	
35	Win	30–0–5	Gus Coen Levine	PTS	8	Sep 14, 1942	St. Nicholas Arena, New York City, New York, US	
34	Win	29–0–5	Cedric Flournoy	KO	3 (6)	Aug 1, 1942	Queensboro Arena, New York City, New York, US	
33	Win	28–0–5	Ted Christie	TKO	2 (6), 2:58	Jul 23, 1942	Twin City Bowl, Elizabeth, New Jersey, US	
32	Win	27–0–5	Jeff Holloway	TKO	5 (6), 2:00	Jul 9, 1942	Fort Hamilton Arena, New York City, New York, US	
31	Win	26–0–5	Bobby Henderson	PTS	6	Jul 3, 1942	Twin City Bowl, Elizabeth, New Jersey, US	
30	Draw	25–0–5	Wallace Brown	PTS	6	Jun 9, 1942	Queensboro Arena, New Jersey, US	
29	Win	25–0–4	Jimmy Anest	PTS	6	Jun 5, 1942	Twin City Bowl, Elizabeth, New Jersey, US	
28	Win	24–0–4	Bobby Root	PTS	6	Jun 1, 1942	St. Nicholas Arena, New York City, New York, US	
27	Win	23–0–4	Moe Weiss	PTS	4	May 15, 1942	Madison Square Garden, New York City, New York, US	
26	Win	22–0–4	Lew Maxwell	PTS	6	Apr 30, 1942	Scott Hall, Elizabeth, New Jersey, US	
25	Win	21–0–4	Al Simmons	KO	1 (6), 2:00	Apr 27, 1942	St. Nicholas Arena, New York, New York, US	
24	Win	20–0–4	Russell Sawyer	KO	1 (6), 1:24	Apr 16, 1942	Scott Hall, Elizabeth, New Jersey, US	
23	Win	19–0–4	Davey Crawford	PTS	6	Apr 7, 1942	Westchester County Center, White Plains, New York, US	
22	Win	18–0–4	Lew Maxwell	PTS	6	Apr 1, 1942	Scott Hall, Elizabeth, New Jersey, US	
21	Win	17–0–4	Al Guido	PTS	6	Mar 23, 1942	St. Nicholas Arena, New York City, New York, US	
20	Win	16–0–4	Al Guido	PTS	6	Mar 3, 1942	Broadway Arena, New York City, New York, US	
19	Win	15–0–4	Harry Diduck	PTS	6	Feb 24, 1942	Westchester County Center, White Plains, New York, US	
18	Win	14–0–4	Terry Amico	KO	2 (6), 2:23	Feb 19, 1942	Scott Hall, Elizabeth, New Jersey, US	
17	Win	13–0–4	Harry Diduck	PTS	6	Feb 17, 1942	Broadway Arena, New York City, New York, US	
16	Win	12–0–4	Bob Henry	KO	2 (4), 2:20	Feb 2, 1942	St. Nicholas Arena, New York City, New York, US	
15	Win	11–0–4	Julian Malavez	KO	3 (4), 1:40	Jan 26, 1942	St. Nicholas Arena, New York City, New York, US	
14	Win	10–0–4	Joe Maldonado	PTS	4	Jan 19, 1942	St. Nicholas Arena, New York City, New York, US	
13	Win	9–0–4	Al Guido	PTS	4	Dec 19, 1941	Madison Square Garden, New York City, New York, US	
12	Draw	8–0–4	Louis La Salle	PTS	4	Dec 9, 1941	Westchester County Center, White Plains, New York, US	
11	Win	8–0–3	Mike Martinez	TKO	3 (4), 0:50	Nov 24, 1941	St. Nicholas Arena, New York City, New York, US	
10	Win	7–0–3	Bobby Henderson	PTS	4	Nov 18, 1941	Westchester County Center, White Plains, New York, US	
9	Win	6–0–3	Bobby Henderson	PTS	4	Nov 10, 1941	St. Nicholas Arena, New York City, New York, US	
8	Win	5–0–3	Bobby Henderson	PTS	4	Oct 13, 1941	Ridgewood Grove, New York City, New York, US	
7	Win	4–0–3	Bob Henry	PTS	4	Sep 30, 1941	Westchester County Center, White Plains, New York, US	
6	Draw	3–0–3	Joey Agro	PTS	4	Jul 30, 1941	Madison Square Garden, New York City, New York, US	
5	Win	3–0–2	Bob Henry	PTS	4	Jun 24, 1941	Queensboro Arena, New York City, New York, US	
4	Draw	2–0–2	Joey Manfro	PTS	4	Jun 9, 1941	Starlight Park, New York City, New York, US	
3	Draw	2–0–1	Jimmy Kemp	PTS	4	May 19, 1941	St. Nicholas Arena, New York City, New York, US	
2	Win	2–0	Frankie Van	PTS	4	May 5, 1941	St. Nicholas Arena, New York City, New York, US	
1	Win	1–0	Connie Savoie	TKO	4 (4), 2:20	Apr 14, 1941	St. Nicholas Arena, New York City, New York, US	
