= Harold Dade =

American boxer

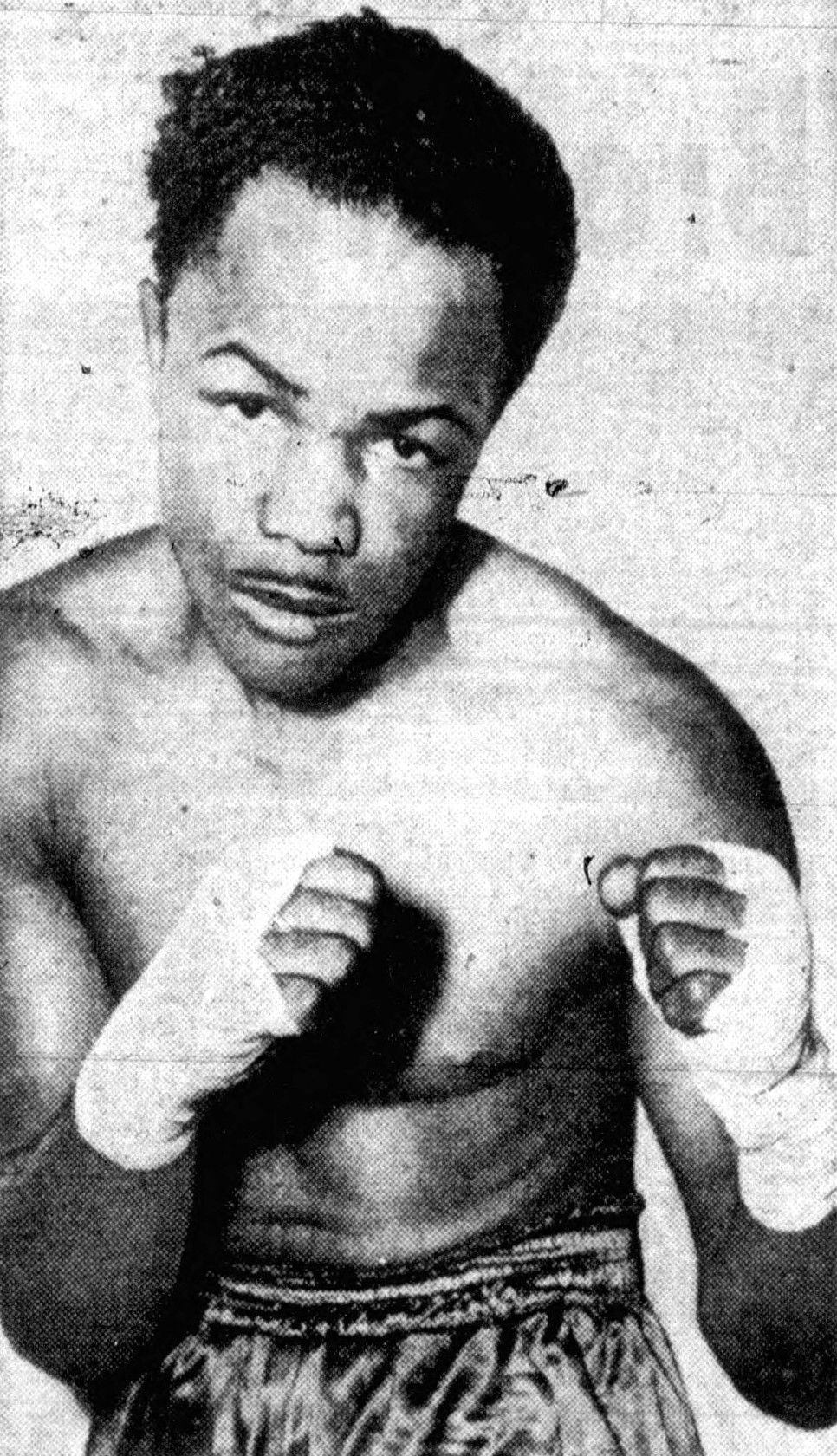
- Dade, circa 1950

Personal information
- Born: Harold Dade; March 24, 1923 Chicago, Illinois, US
- Died: July 17, 1962 (aged 39)
- Height: 5 ft 5 in (1.65 m)
- Weight: Featherweight

Boxing career
- Reach: 68 in (168 cm)
- Stance: Orthodox

Boxing record
- Total fights: 76
- Wins: 39
- Win by KO: 8
- Losses: 31
- Draws: 6

Harold Dade (March 24, 1923 – July 17, 1962) was an American professional boxer in the Bantamweight division who held the Undisputed World Bantamweight Championship.

== Amateur career ==
- Won the 1940 Chicago Golden Gloves Championship in the flyweight (112 lb) division by decision over Gene Evans. Dropped a decision for the (112 lb) Intercity Championship to Demetrio Carabella.
- Won the 1941 Chicago Golden Gloves Tournament of Champions in the flyweight (112 lb) division by decision over Paul Carbetta. He was on the short end of an unpopular decision at the Intercity matches in the same year against Diogenes Leon.
- Runner up in the 1941 National AAU Championship in Boston, in the Flyweight Class. Dade defeated Tony Peppi of Boston in the semi-finals, before losing the final to Lawrence Torpy of Philadelphia.

== Pro career ==
Dade turned pro in 1942 and captured the World Bantamweight championship in 1947 with a win over Manuel Ortiz.

== Professional boxing record ==
56 fights	38 wins	12 losses
By knockout	8	4
By decision	30	6
By disqualification	0	2
Draws	6	

No.	Result	Record	Opponent	Type	Round	Date	Age	Location	Notes
76	Loss	38–32–6	Paul Jorgensen	TKO	3 (10)	Mar 29, 1955	32 years, 5 days	City Auditorium, Houston, Texas, U.S.	
75	Loss	38–31–6	Ernie Kemick	UD	10	Apr 9, 1953	30 years, 16 days	Victoria Pavilion, Calgary, Alberta, Canada	
74	Loss	38–30–6	Bobby Woods	UD	10	Nov 27, 1952	29 years, 248 days	Exhibition Gardens, Vancouver, British Columbia, Canada	
73	Loss	38–29–6	Lauro Salas	KO	4 (10)	Jun 22, 1952	29 years, 90 days	Arena Monterrey, Monterrey, Nuevo León, Mexico	
72	Win	38–28–6	Bobby Woods	SD	10	Feb 28, 1952	28 years, 341 days	Armory, Spokane, Washington, U.S.	
71	Loss	37–28–6	Diego Sosa	UD	10	Jun 30, 1951	28 years, 98 days	Palacio de Deportes, Havana, Cuba	
70	Loss	37–27–6	Fabela Chavez	SD	10	Jun 1, 1951	28 years, 69 days	Legion Stadium, Hollywood, California, U.S.	
69	Loss	37–26–6	Memo Valero	DQ	5 (10)	Apr 21, 1951	28 years, 28 days	Arena Coliseo, Mexico City, Distrito Federal, Mexico	
68	Loss	37–25–6	Felix Ramirez	UD	10	Mar 6, 1951	27 years, 347 days	San Jose, California, U.S.	
67	Loss	37–24–6	Percy Bassett	TKO	8 (10)	Jan 30, 1951	27 years, 312 days	Arena, Philadelphia, Pennsylvania, U.S.	
66	Loss	37–23–6	Stanley McKay	PTS	10	Dec 3, 1950	27 years, 254 days	Arena de Colon, Colon City, Panama	
65	Loss	37–22–6	Stanley McKay	PTS	10	Oct 8, 1950	27 years, 198 days	Arena de Colon, Colon City, Panama	
64	Win	37–21–6	Kid Chocolate II	PTS	10	Sep 24, 1950	27 years, 184 days	Arena de Colon, Colon City, Panama	
63	Win	36–21–6	Johnny Efhan	PTS	10	Aug 18, 1950	27 years, 147 days	Memorial Auditorium, Sacramento, California, U.S.	
62	Loss	35–21–6	Rudy Garcia	TKO	11 (12)	Jul 14, 1950	27 years, 112 days	Legion Stadium, Hollywood, California, U.S.	For vacant USA California State featherweight title
61	Loss	35–20–6	Eddie Chavez	SD	10	Apr 24, 1950	27 years, 31 days	Civic Auditorium, San Francisco, California, U.S.	
60	Loss	35–19–6	Eddie Chavez	TD	5 (10)	Apr 4, 1950	27 years, 11 days	San Jose, California, U.S.	Accidental headbutt
59	Loss	35–18–6	Manuel Ortiz	SD	10	Mar 7, 1950	26 years, 348 days	Olympic Auditorium, Los Angeles, California, U.S.	
58	Draw	35–17–6	Chico Rosa	PTS	10	Feb 14, 1950	26 years, 327 days	San Jose, California, U.S.	
57	Loss	35–17–5	Keith Nuttall	UD	10	Jan 31, 1950	26 years, 313 days	Fairgrounds Coliseum, Salt Lake City, Utah, U.S.	
56	Draw	35–16–5	Baby LeRoy	MD	10	Jan 18, 1950	26 years, 300 days	Memorial Auditorium, Sacramento, California, U.S.	
55	Loss	35–16–4	Keith Nuttall	SD	10	Jan 2, 1950	26 years, 284 days	Fairgrounds Coliseum, Salt Lake City, Utah, U.S.	
54	Loss	35–15–4	Willie Pep	UD	10	Dec 12, 1949	26 years, 263 days	Kiel Auditorium, Saint Louis, Missouri, U.S.	
53	Loss	35–14–4	Corky Gonzalez	UD	10	Nov 22, 1949	26 years, 243 days	Auditorium, Saint Paul, Minnesota, U.S.	
52	Win	35–13–4	Elley Bennett	PTS	12	Oct 17, 1949	26 years, 207 days	Sydney Stadium, Sydney, New South Wales, Australia	
51	Win	34–13–4	Frank Flannery	PTS	12	Sep 30, 1949	26 years, 190 days	West Melbourne Stadium, Melbourne, Victoria, Australia	
50	Loss	33–13–4	Sandy Saddler	PTS	10	Sep 2, 1949	26 years, 162 days	Chicago Stadium, Chicago, Illinois, U.S.	
49	Loss	33–12–4	Alberto Sandoval	UD	10	Aug 2, 1949	26 years, 131 days	Plaza de Toros, Ciudad Juarez, Chihuahua, Mexico	
48	Loss	33–11–4	Corky Gonzales	UD	10	Jul 21, 1949	26 years, 119 days	City Auditorium, Denver, Colorado, U.S.	
47	Win	33–10–4	Jesus Fonseca	UD	10	May 31, 1949	26 years, 68 days	Olympic Auditorium, Los Angeles, California, U.S.	
46	Win	32–10–4	Joey Ortega	UD	10	Apr 14, 1949	26 years, 21 days	Ice Palace, Tacoma, Washington, U.S.	
45	Win	31–10–4	Aaron Joshua	RTD	4 (10)	Mar 1, 1949	25 years, 342 days	Auditorium, Portland, Oregon, U.S.	
44	Win	30–10–4	Joey Vélez	UD	10	Feb 16, 1949	25 years, 329 days	Armory, Spokane, Washington, U.S.	
43	Win	29–10–4	Joey Clemo	UD	10	Jan 18, 1949	25 years, 300 days	Civic Auditorium, Seattle, Washington, U.S.	
42	Win	28–10–4	Lauro Salas	UD	12	Dec 7, 1948	25 years, 258 days	Olympic Auditorium, Los Angeles, California, U.S.	Won vacant USA California State featherweight title
41	Win	27–10–4	Charley Riley	PTS	8	Oct 29, 1948	25 years, 219 days	Chicago Stadium, Chicago, Illinois, U.S.	
40	Loss	26–10–4	Henry Davis	UD	10	Sep 28, 1948	25 years, 188 days	Civic Auditorium, Honolulu, Hawaii	
39	Loss	26–9–4	Luis Galvani	PTS	10	Aug 28, 1948	25 years, 157 days	Palacio de Deportes, Havana, Cuba	
38	Draw	26–8–4	Charley Riley	MD	10	Jul 12, 1948	25 years, 110 days	Kiel Auditorium, Saint Louis, Missouri, U.S.	
37	Win	26–8–3	Charley Riley	UD	10	Jun 21, 1948	25 years, 89 days	Marigold Gardens, Chicago, Chicago, U.S.	
36	Loss	25–8–3	Jackie Graves	UD	10	Jun 3, 1948	25 years, 71 days	Auditorium, Minneapolis, Minnesota, U.S.	
35	Loss	25–7–3	Carlos Chavez	UD	10	Apr 13, 1948	25 years, 20 days	Olympic Auditorium, Los Angeles, California, U.S.	
34	Loss	25–6–3	Luis Galvani	DQ	8 (10)	Apr 3, 1948	25 years, 10 days	Palacio de Deportes, Havana, Cuba	Dade was disqualified for butting
33	Win	25–5–3	Jackie McCoy	PTS	10	Mar 16, 1948	24 years, 358 days	San Jose, California, U.S.	
32	Win	24–5–3	Lauro Salas	PTS	10	Mar 3, 1948	24 years, 345 days	Memorial Auditorium, Sacramento, California, U.S.	
31	Win	23–5–3	Bobby Jackson	TKO	7 (10)	Jan 6, 1948	24 years, 288 days	Olympic Auditorium, Los Angeles, California, U.S.	
30	Win	22–5–3	Manny Ortega	UD	10	Dec 23, 1947	24 years, 274 days	Olympic Auditorium, Los Angeles, California, U.S.	
29	Loss	21–5–3	Star Naven	PTS	10	Dec 6, 1947	24 years, 257 days	Rizal Memorial Sports Complex, Manila, Metro Manila, Philippines	
28	Win	21–4–3	Speedy Cabanela	PTS	10	Oct 18, 1947	24 years, 208 days	Rizal Memorial Coliseum, Manila, Metro Manila, Philippines	
27	Loss	20–4–3	Simon Vergara	MD	10	Aug 26, 1947	24 years, 155 days	Olympic Auditorium, Los Angeles, California, U.S.	
26	Loss	20–3–3	Carlos Chavez	SD	12	Jul 22, 1947	24 years, 120 days	Olympic Auditorium, Los Angeles, California, U.S.	For USA California State featherweight title
25	Win	20–2–3	Jackie McCoy	PTS	10	May 27, 1947	24 years, 64 days	San Jose, California, U.S.	
24	Draw	19–2–3	Carlos Chavez	SD	12	May 6, 1947	24 years, 43 days	Olympic Auditorium, Los Angeles, California, U.S.	For USA California State featherweight title
23	Win	19–2–2	Tony Olivera	PTS	10	Apr 2, 1947	24 years, 9 days	Auditorium, Oakland, California, U.S.	
22	Loss	18–2–2	Manuel Ortiz	UD	15	Mar 11, 1947	23 years, 352 days	Olympic Auditorium, Los Angeles, California, U.S.	Lost NYSAC, NBA, and The Ring bantamweight titles
21	Win	18–1–2	Speedy Cabanela	UD	10	Feb 12, 1947	23 years, 325 days	Auditorium, Oakland, California, U.S.	
20	Win	17–1–2	Manuel Ortiz	UD	15	Jan 6, 1947	23 years, 288 days	Civic Auditorium, San Francisco, California, U.S.	Won NYSAC, NBA, and The Ring bantamweight titles
19	Win	16–1–2	Joey Dolan	PTS	10	Dec 13, 1946	23 years, 264 days	Auditorium, Portland, Oregon, U.S.	
18	Win	15–1–2	Juan Leanos	UD	10	Sep 9, 1946	23 years, 169 days	Ocean Park Arena, Santa Monica, California, U.S.	
17	Win	14–1–2	Billy Gibson	PTS	8	May 7, 1946	23 years, 44 days	Ryan's Auditorium, Fresno, California, U.S.	
16	Win	13–1–2	Joe Borjon Flores	PTS	8	Apr 30, 1946	23 years, 37 days	Ryan's Auditorium, Fresno, California, U.S.	
15	Win	12–1–2	Jesse Salazar	KO	3 (6)	Apr 26, 1946	23 years, 33 days	Legion Stadium, Hollywood, California, U.S.	
14	Win	11–1–2	Billy Clark	TKO	2 (6)	Apr 16, 1946	23 years, 23 days	Ryan's Auditorium, Fresno, California, U.S.	
13	Win	10–1–2	Robert Ruperto Garcia	KO	3 (6)	Apr 9, 1945	22 years, 16 days	Civic Auditorium, San Jose, California, U.S.	
12	Win	9–1–2	McDon	KO	1 (?)	Sep 1, 1944	21 years, 161 days	(bout was held overseas from the U.S.)	Date unknown
11	Win	8–1–2	Al Gregorio	KO	2 (?)	Mar 1, 1944	20 years, 343 days	(bout was held overseas from the U.S.)	Date unknown
10	Win	7–1–2	Joey Dolan	PTS	10	May 14, 1943	20 years, 51 days	Auditorium, Portland, Oregon, U.S.	
9	Win	6–1–2	Dave Hernandez	PTS	6	May 11, 1943	20 years, 48 days	Olympic Auditorium, Los Angeles, California, U.S.	
8	Win	5–1–2	Victor Flores	PTS	10	Apr 22, 1943	20 years, 29 days	Coliseum, San Diego, California, U.S.	
7	Win	4–1–2	Victor Flores	PTS	8	Mar 22, 1943	19 years, 363 days	Ocean Park Arena, Santa Monica, California, U.S.	
6	Loss	3–1–2	Pedro Ramirez	PTS	6	Feb 26, 1943	19 years, 339 days	Legion Stadium, Hollywood, California, U.S.	
5	Win	3–0–2	Chester Ellis	PTS	10	Feb 19, 1943	19 years, 332 days	Coliseum, San Diego, California, U.S.	
4	Draw	2–0–2	Ceferino Robleto	PTS	8	Jan 18, 1943	19 years, 300 days	Ocean Park Arena, Santa Monica, California, U.S.	
3	Win	2–0–1	Orville Young	TKO	4 (4)	Jan 8, 1943	19 years, 290 days	Legion Stadium, Hollywood, California, U.S.	
2	Draw	1–0–1	Joe Robleto	PTS	6	Jan 4, 1943	19 years, 286 days	Ocean Park Arena, Santa Monica, California, U.S.	
1	Win	1–0	Ceferino Robleto	PTS	4	Dec 18, 1942	19 years, 269 days	Legion Stadium, Hollywood, California, U.S.	

== Titles in boxing ==
=== Major world titles ===
- NYSAC bantamweight champion (118 lbs)
- NBA (WBA) bantamweight champion (118 lbs)

=== The Ring magazine titles ===
- The Ring bantamweight champion (118 lbs)

=== Regional/International titles ===
- California State featherweight champion (126 lbs)

=== Undisputed titles ===
- Undisputed bantamweight champion

== See also ==
- List of world bantamweight boxing champions

Achievements
Preceded by Manuel Ortiz	World Bantamweight Champion; 6 Jan 1947– 11 Mar 1947	Succeeded by Manuel Ortiz
