= Larry LaCoursiere =

American boxer

Larry LaCoursiere, alias "Lightning," is a retired professional welterweight boxer from Hastings, Minnesota.

== Boxing career ==
LaCoursiere made his professional debut with a knockout win against Remuse Caffee at Roy Wilkins Auditorium in Saint Paul, Minnesota on October 24, 1990. After 16 consecutive wins, LaCoursiere took a major step up, facing 12-0 Richie Albrecht in Minneapolis, Minnesota in November 1992. The result of the fight with Albrecht was a split draw. LaCoursiere subsequently faced some of the best boxers in the world, losing to Kostya Tszyu, Tony Lopez, Todd Foster, Gary Murray, Julio César Chávez, and Hector Camacho Jr, and defeating former IBO World lightweight champion Mike Evgen. At the time of his retirement in 2001, LaCoursiere had compiled a professional record of 26–9–1. In 2016 the Minnesota Boxing Hall of Fame announced that LaCoursiere would be inducted as a member of the class of 2016.
