= Evgen =

Evgen is a given name and a surname, a variant of Evgeny.

- Evgen Avtsine, pen name of Claude Aveline (1901–1992), writer, publisher, editor, poet and member of the French Resistance
- Evgen Gvaladze (1900–1937), Georgian lawyer, journalist and politician
- Evgen Sajovic (1913–1986), Slovene painter
- Mike Evgen (fl. 1989–2012), American Boxer
