= Frank Palermo =

American gangster (1905-1996)

- Palermo's August 15, 1950 mugshot
- Born: January 26, 1905; Philadelphia, Pennsylvania, U.S.
- Died: May 12, 1996 (aged 91); Philadelphia, Pennsylvania, U.S.
- Other name: "Blinky"
- Occupations: Racketeer, boxing promoter
- Allegiance: Philadelphia crime family
- Convictions: Conspiracy and extortion (1961)
- Penalty: 25 years imprisonment; served 7 years'

Frank "Blinky" Palermo (January 26, 1905 – May 12, 1996) was an American organized crime figure and boxing promoter who surreptitiously owned prize fighters and fixed fights; he was best known for fixing the Jake LaMotta–Billy Fox fight in 1947. An associate of the Philadelphia crime family, Palermo also ran Philadelphia's biggest numbers racket. Palermo's partner was Mafioso Frankie Carbo, a soldier in New York's Lucchese family who had been a gunman with Murder, Inc.

== Palermo's fighters ==
In addition to Billy Fox, the professional fighters that Palermo owned outright or under the table included World Welterweight champion Virgil Akins, number three-ranked heavyweight contender Clarence Henry, World Welterweight Champion Johnny Saxton, heavyweight contender Coley Wallace, and Lightweight Champion Ike Williams.

Palermo would cheat members of his stable out of their share of the purses of their fights.

=== Billy Fox ===
Known as "Blackjack", Fox started off his career in a fashion reminiscent of the rise of heavyweight champ Primo Carnera (owned by mobster Owney Madden) and of future welterweight champ Johnny Saxton (whose contract was owned by Palermo) by winning 36 consecutive fights, all by knockout, before he was knocked out by Gus Lesnevich for the world light heavyweight title. He would rack up seven more wins, including a win in a notorious bout allegedly thrown by Jake LaMotta. The LaMotta fight was fixed by Palermo, who owned Fox under the table.

Many boxing aficionados did not consider Fox a fighter talented enough to have obtained his lofty ranking without the help of Palermo. After the LaMotta debacle, which was immortalized in Martin Scorsese's movie Raging Bull, Fox lost to Red Willis Applegate and Gus Lesnevich, to whom he lost in the first round by a knockout in 1.58 seconds.

=== Ike Williams ===
Ike Williams, the world's lightweight boxing champion from 1945 to 1951, was managed by Palermo for part of his career. According to Williams, he was blackballed by the boxing managers guild when he sought to manage himself. Palermo informed him he could resolve his problems with the guild, and Williams agreed to let Palermo manage him.

In 1960, Williams testified before the Kefauver Commission investigating Mob control of boxing. Williams told the commission that he was broke and working for $46 per week despite having won $1 million in purses. He claimed Palermo refused to pay him his share of the purses from two fights worth approximately $40,000, on which he had to pay taxes. He said he had never tried to collect the monies owed him by Palermo. According to Sports Illustrated:

He is a circumspect fellow and clearly to this day has no wish to anger Blinky. Thus, though he told how Blinky brought him offer after offer to throw fights for bribes as big as $100,000, he insisted that Blinky advised him to turn the offers down. It was a fatherly picture but it did seem out of character.

Williams did claim to have taken a dive against Chuck Davey, a much hyped contender for the welterweight crown.

=== Clarence Henry ===
On June 4, 1954, Los Angeles-based heavyweight boxer Clarence Henry, who was managed by Palermo, was arrested in New York City for attempting to bribe Oakland, California middleweight Bobby Jones to throw his June 11 Madison Square Garden match with Joey Giardello. Henry allegedly offered $15,000 (equivalent to approximately $179,833 in today's funds) to Jones to throw the fight. Once the third-ranked heavyweight contender, Henry was released after posting $2,000 bail and subsequently retired from the ring. Giardello beat Jones in a close decision.

A future middleweight champion, Giardello was blocked from a shot at the title by Palermo and the underworld figures who controlled the sport in the 1950s and early '60s. Giardello finally won the title in 1963, after Palermo and Carbo had been imprisoned.

=== Johnny Saxton ===
Johnny Saxton was a promising amateur fighter who won 31 of his 33 amateur bouts. He was twice a National AAU champion and won a Golden Gloves title. When he turned professional in 1949, he was managed by Bill “Pop” Miller, but Miller sold his contract to Palermo for $10,000. In his first 40 pro fight, he racked up a record of 39 wins and one draw. Palermo had once manipulated Billy Fox to a similar record early in his career to make him a contender. Some of Saxton's opponents in the ring in his journeyman days put in such pitiful performances, they angered not only the crowd but ring officials. Saxton became an unpopular fighter.

Saxton lost his first pro bout to Gil Turner in 1953, dropped a decision to Del Flanagan and drew against Johnny Lombardo. After beating Joey Giardello and Johnny Bratton, he met world welterweight champion Kid Gavilán (often spelled Kid Gavilan) in 1954 in a title bout and defeated him in a fifteen-round decision. That fight was widely thought to be fixed. Bookies reportedly had refused to take wagers on the fight. Gavilan—no stranger to fixed fights—cried and said that he had been given “the business.” Twenty of 22 ringside reporters believed Gavilan won the fight.

In a 2002 interview with The Observer, was one of the ringside observers.

"...Frankie Carbo, the mob's unofficial commissioner for boxing, controlled a lot of the welters and middles.... Not every fight was fixed, of course, but from time to time Carbo and his lieutenants, like Blinky Palermo in Philadelphia, would put the fix in. When the Kid Gavilan-Johnny Saxton fight was won by Saxton on a decision in Philadelphia in 1954, I was covering it for Sports Illustrated and wrote a piece at that time saying boxing was a dirty business and must be cleaned up now. It was an open secret. All the press knew that one - and other fights - were fixed. Gavilan was a mob-controlled fighter, too, and when he fought Billy Graham it was clear Graham had been robbed of the title. The decision would be bought. If it was close, the judges would shade it the way they had been told."

Saxton lost his title the following year via technical knockout to Tony DeMarco, then won it back in 1956 with an upset win over Carmen Basilio, another fight that was thought to be fixed. Basilio said of losing his title to the referees' decision, “It was like being robbed in a dark alley.” He lost the title again in a rematch with Basilio later in the year. His wins against Gavilan and Basilio were both controversial and unpopular with many in the boxing world. He retired in 1958.

Unlike other boxers exploited by Palermo, Saxton expressed loyalty to him. A statement issued in 1955 declared:

"Since my first professional fight in 1949 Frank Palermo has been my manager, friend, and adviser. He has been honest and trustworthy in every dealing we have had during my career. I now hold the welterweight championship of the world. I am going along with Palermo."

After having his property seized by the IRS, Saxton wound up penniless. While being treated at a state mental hospital after being arrested for robbery in his retirement, he said, "I was supposed to have got big money from fighting on TV, but I never saw it. No one ever gave me more than a couple of hundred dollars at a time."

=== Sonny Liston ===
By 1959, Blinky and his partner, Mafioso Frankie Carbo, owned a majority interest in the contract of heavyweight boxer Sonny Liston, who went on to win the World Heavyweight Championship in 1962. From the start of his pro career in 1953, Liston had been "owned" by St. Louis mobster John Vitale, who continued to own a stake in the boxer. At the time Palermo and Carbo acquired their interest in Liston, the notorious Carbo was imprisoned on Rikers Island, having been convicted of the undercover management of prize-fighters and unlicensed matchmaking.

According to both FBI and newspaper reports, Vitale and other mobsters "reportedly controlled Liston's contract", with Vitale owning approximately twelve percent.

Liston fought 12 fights under the control of Carbo and Palermo.

== Senate investigation ==
In 1960, Palermo and Carbo, who had just been released from jail after serving time for managing boxers without a license, were subpoenaed to appear before Senator Estes Kefauver's investigation committee into Mob control of boxing. Palermo pleaded the Fifth Amendment to avoid testifying, as did Carbo, who took the Fifth 25 times. Kefauver recommended that Palermo and Carbo be cited for Contempt of Congress.

== Imprisonment ==
The following year, 1961, Palermo and Carbo, along with Los Angeles mobsters Joseph Sica and Louis Dragna, were charged with conspiracy and extortion against National Boxing Association Welterweight Champion Don Jordan. After a three-month trial, in which U.S. Attorney General Robert F. Kennedy served as prosecutor, Carbo and Palermo were convicted in May 1961 and sentenced to 25 years in prison. Palermo went free on $100,000 bail as he launched a series of unsuccessful appeals against his conviction. He was released from United States Penitentiary, Lewisburg on November 8, 1971 after serving seven and a half years of his sentence.

== Later years and death ==
By the late 1970s, Palermo was working with young fighters at the Montgomery County Boys' Club in suburban Philadelphia. On March 13, 1978, he withdrew his request to the Pennsylvania State Athletic Commission for a manager's license in connection with the boys' club due to what his lawyer alleged to be harassment by the "awesome power of the press". Palermo said "I think the news media is very unfair" and asked "I paid my debt to society, so what do they want?".

Palermo died in obscurity in May 1996, aged 91. He was laid to rest at Holy Cross Cemetery in Yeadon, Pennsylvania.
