= Off Limits (1953 film) =

1953 film by George Marshall

- 1953 Theatrical Poster
- Directed by: George Marshall
- Written by: Hal Kanter (story and screenplay); Jack Sher (story and screenplay)
- Produced by: Harry Tugend
- Starring: Bob Hope; Mickey Rooney; Marilyn Maxwell
- Cinematography: J. Peverell Marley
- Edited by: Arthur P. Schmidt
- Music by: Van Cleave
- Production company: Paramount Pictures
- Distributed by: Paramount Pictures
- Release date: February 19, 1953
- Running time: 89 minutes
- Country: United States
- Language: English
- Box office: $2.5 million (US)

Off Limits is a 1953 American comedy film directed by George Marshall and starring Bob Hope, Mickey Rooney and Marilyn Maxwell. Hope plays a manager who enlists in the army to keep an eye on his boxer, who has been drafted. The picture was written by Hal Kanter and Jack Sher, and was released in the UK as Military Policemen, as the characters played by Hope and Rooney join the military police.

== Plot ==
After a difficult climb to the top, Wally Hogan has things finally going his way. He is the manager-trainer of Bullet Bradley, a fighter who has just won the lightweight championship. Life suddenly takes a not-so-happy turn, however, when Bullet gets drafted. Hogan's gangster partners persuade him to enlist and keep an eye on the fighter, who is subsequently declared psychologically unfit for the Army. Enter Herbert Tuttle, a draftee eager to have Hogan turn him into a fighter. Hogan reluctantly agrees only after he discovers Tuttle's aunt is the beautiful singer at a nightclub. From then on it is a case of stringing Tuttle along while trying to get close to his aunt. To further complicate Hogan's life there is Captain Danzig, his rapidly promoted-from-corporal-to-captain commanding officer who tries to squash the shenanigans.

Hogan and Tuttle volunteer to be MP's when they learn they are allowed to patrol outside the base. Tuttle leaks to reporters that he is Hogan's new protege, which leads to Tuttle fighting the Navy champ in an exhibition. The bout takes place aboard the USS Iowa at sea, and Hogan becomes so violently seasick the "seconds" work on HIM between rounds and not Tuttle. Tuttle is knocked out, making him the laughing stock of the post.

An argument at Connie's club over whether or not Tuttle threw the fight escalates until the club is a total wreck. The base commandant orders Hogan to post an OFF LIMITS notice forbidding servicemen to go there. Hogan goes AWOL rather than do so.

A few days later, Hogan is hiding out in the back rooms of a fight arena where Tuttle is a spectator. Tuttle tries to keep fighters from working out on a "heavy bag" that Hogan is hiding inside, and accidentally knocks out one of the main event fighters. Forced to substitute, Tuttle wins by knockout and restores his reputation. Captain Danzig doesn't like Hogan, but the fighting pride of the base comes first. Tuttle eventually gets the title match with Bullets Bradley. When gangsters threaten Hogan that Tuttle had better lose, he takes revenge by destroying what he thinks is their car. However, the car belongs to an irate General who is in no mood for explanations.

The night of the fight, Hogan escapes from the stockade and ends up broadcasting instructions to Tuttle by walkie-talkie from a saloon across the street. Tuttle wins by 4th-round knockout. Hogan and Connie leave on their honeymoon...chaperoned by Captain Danzig.

== Cast ==
- Bob Hope as Wally Hogan
- Mickey Rooney as Herbert Tuttle
- Marilyn Maxwell as Connie Curtis
- Eddie Mayehoff as Karl Danzig
- Stanley Clements as Bullets Bradley
- Jack Dempsey as himself
- Marvin Miller as Vic Breck
- John Ridgely as Lieutenant Commander Parnell
- Tom Harmon as himself
- Norman Leavitt as Chowhound
- Art Aragon as himself
- Kim Spalding as Seaman Harker
- Jerry Hausner as Fishy
- Mike Mahoney as MP Huggins
- Joan Taylor as Helen
- Carolyn Jones as Deborah (uncredited)
- Charles Bronson as Russell (uncredited)
- Lyle Latell as Bartender (uncredited)
- Freeman Lusk as The General (uncredited)
- James Seay as Army Psychiatrist (uncredited)

== Production ==
- During the final bar scene, Bing Crosby, Bob Hope's frequent co-star, is seen briefly, singing on the bar's television set.
- Alan Young was to co-star with Hope in the picture.
- In addition to retired champion boxer Jack Dempsey, the film features Art Aragon, a popular Southern California boxer.
- Orchestra leader and vocalist Muzzy Marcellino dubbed "wolf-whistles" for the picture, according to Paramount press information, included in the file on the film at the AMPAS Library.
- Publicity also notes that the United States Army Provost Marshal General's office in Washington, D.C. gave Mickey Rooney special permission to depict an MP, even though the minimum height requirement was 5'7" and Rooney was only 5'3".
- Hope and Marilyn Maxwell had an affair spanning years that led insiders to refer to her as "Mrs. Bob Hope."
- Rooney wore his World War II uniform in the film, according to publicity.
- Was shot on location in the Los Angeles area, representing the fictional City of Ashton.

== See also ==
- List of boxing films
