= Dan Schommer =

American boxer

Dan Schommer, alias "Dangerous Dan," is an American former professional boxer who competed from 1986 to 1994, challenging for the WBO super middleweight title in 1994.

== Amateur career ==
Schommer compiled an amateur boxing record of 95-9, and was a six-time winner of the Upper Midwest Golden Gloves.

== Professional career ==
Schommer made his professional debut in 1986, at age 26, defeating Cleo Johns by TKO. In an eight-year professional career Schommer won nationally televised fights against Alberto Gonzalez, Ricky Stackhouse, and Nicky Walker. The pinnacle of his career occurred in October 1994 when he fought world champion Chris Eubank with Eubank's WBO super middleweight belt on the line. Eubank won an unpopular unanimous decision, after which Schommer retired with a career record of 30-1-1. Schommer was inducted into the Minnesota Boxing Hall of Fame in October 2013.
