= Frankie Carbo =

American mobster (1904–1976)

- Born: Paolo Giovanni Carbo; August 10, 1904; Agrigento, Sicily, Kingdom of Italy
- Died: November 9, 1976 (aged 72); Miami Beach, Florida, U.S.
- Other names: John Paul Carbo, Frank Russo, Frank Trucker, Jimmy the Wop, Mr. Gray, Mr. Fury, Czar of Boxing
- Allegiance: Lucchese crime family Murder, Inc.
- Convictions: Assault, grand larceny, manslaughter (1924); Managing boxers without licence (1950s); Conspiracy, extortion (1961)
- Penalty: 2 to 4 years' imprisonment; served 20 months 2 years' imprisonment 25 years' imprisonment

Paul John "Frankie" Carbo (born Paolo Giovanni Carbo, Italian: [ˈpaːolo dʒoˈvanni ˈkarbo]; August 10, 1904 – November 9, 1976) was an Italian-American New York City Mafia soldier in the Lucchese crime family who operated as a gunman with Murder, Inc. before transitioning into one of the most powerful promoters in professional boxing.

== Early years ==
Carbo was born in Agrigento, Sicily, on August 10, 1904. Carbo was sent to the New York State Reformatory for juvenile delinquents at age eleven. Over the next ten years, Carbo would be in and out of prison on charges including assault and grand larceny. During this period, Carbo was arrested for the murder of a taxi driver who refused to pay protection money. Pleading not guilty, Carbo claimed self-defense. He eventually agreed to a plea bargain of manslaughter in exchange for a reduced sentence of two to four years in prison. After serving 20 months in prison, Carbo was released.

== Prohibition ==
With the passage of Prohibition, Carbo began working as a hired gunman for several bootlegger gangs. In 1931, Carbo was charged with the murder of Philadelphia mobster Michael "Mickey" Duffy in Atlantic City, New Jersey; however, Carbo was eventually released. During the early 1930s, Carbo began working for Murder, Inc. under boss Louis "Lepke" Buchalter.

== Murder record ==
By the end of the 1930s, Carbo had been arrested 17 times and had been charged with five more murders. In 1939, Carbo allegedly participated in the murder of informant Harry "Big Greenie" Greenberg in California; he was arrested for it two years later. This time, former Murder Inc. members Abe "Kid Twist" Reles and Allie "Tick Tock" Tannenbaum agreed to testify against Carbo. However, before the trial began, Reles, who was under police protection, fell to his death from a window of the Half Moon Hotel in Coney Island. His death was ruled a suicide, and the case against Carbo was eventually dismissed. Former Philadelphia crime family boss Ralph Natale has claimed that Carbo was responsible for murdering Benjamin "Bugsy" Siegel in Beverly Hills, California, in 1947 at the behest of Meyer Lansky.

== Boxing promoter ==
During the 1940s, Carbo became a boxing promoter, working along with Ettore "Eddie" Coco, James "Jimmy Doyle" Plumeri, Frank "Blinky" Palermo, Harry "Champ" Segal and Felix Bocchicchio. The group was known as "The Combination", together they were highly successful in fixing high-profile boxing matches. Carbo eventually became known as the "Czar of Boxing".

In a 2002 interview with The Observer, Budd Schulberg talked about Carbo and his partner Palermo and their involvement in a 1954 welterweight championship fight.

...Frankie Carbo, the mob's unofficial commissioner for boxing, controlled a lot of the welters and middles... Not every fight was fixed, of course, but from time to time Carbo and his lieutenants, like Blinky Palermo in Philadelphia, would put the fix in. When the Kid Gavilán-Johnny Saxton fight was won by Saxton on a decision in Philadelphia in 1954, I was covering it for Sports Illustrated and wrote a piece at that time saying boxing was a dirty business and must be cleaned up now. It was an open secret. All the press knew that one – and other fights – were fixed. Gavilan was a mob-controlled fighter, too, and when he fought Billy Graham it was clear Graham had been robbed of the title. The decision would be bought. If it was close, the judges would shade it the way they had been told.

Saxton was managed by Blinky Palermo. After losing his title to Tony DeMarco in 1955, he would regain it in a 1955 title match against welterweight champ Carmen Basilio, another fight considered to be fixed.

=== Sonny Liston ===
By 1959, Carbo and his partner Blinky Palermo owned a majority interest in the contract of heavyweight boxer Sonny Liston, who went on to win the World Heavyweight Championship in 1962. From the start of his pro career in 1953, Liston had been "owned" by St. Louis mobster John Vitale, who continued to own a stake in the boxer. At the time Palermo and Carbo acquired their interest in Liston, the notorious Carbo was imprisoned on Rikers Island, having been convicted of the undercover management of prizefighters and unlicensed matchmaking.

According to both FBI and newspaper reports, Vitale and other mobsters "reportedly controlled Liston's contract", with Vitale owning approximately twelve percent. Liston fought 12 fights under the control of Carbo and Palermo.

== Further legal troubles and death ==
In the late 1950s, Carbo started running into legal troubles. First, he was convicted of managing boxers without a license and was sentenced to two years in the New York City jail on Riker's Island. Following his release in 1960, Carbo was subpoenaed to appear before a Senate investigating committee to testify on his involvement in professional boxing. Carbo took the Fifth Amendment 25 times, answering "I cannot be compelled to be a witness against myself".

Former world welterweight and middleweight champion Carmen Basilio testified before the U.S. Senate Judiciary Committee's Subcommittee on Antitrust and Monopoly during its investigation of professional boxing, giving evidence on Carbo, Carbo's partner Frank "Blinky" Palermo (a member of the Philadelphia crime family), and Carbo's aide, Gabriel Genovese, a cousin of Mafia Don Vito Genovese who was convicted in 1959 of being an unlicensed boxing manager. Calling for a house cleaning of professional boxing, Basilio's testimony revealed that his former managers had to pay off organized crime for his title shots and that he essentially had a behind the scenes manager in Genovese.

Evidence submitted to the subcommittee showed that Basilio's on-the-record managers, John DeJohn and Joseph Netro, paid Gabriel Genovese $39,334.41 and approximately $25,000, respectively, during the time Basilio fought for and defended his welterweight and middleweight titles. Genovese was a frontman for Carbo.

In 1961, Carbo and boxing promoter Frank "Blinky" Palermo were charged with conspiracy and extortion against the National Boxing Association welterweight Champion Don Jordan. After a three-month trial in which U.S. Attorney General Robert Kennedy served as prosecutor, Carbo was sentenced to 25 years in prison, serving his sentence at Alcatraz Federal Penitentiary in California, McNeil Island in Washington state and United States Penitentiary, Marion in Illinois.

Granted early parole due to ill health, Carbo was released from prison. He died in Miami Beach, Florida, on November 9, 1976.

== In popular culture ==
Character Tommy Como (Nicholas Colasanto) in the Martin Scorsese film Raging Bull, which stars Robert De Niro as boxer Jake LaMotta, is based on Carbo. Carbo is also the inspiration for boxing promoter Nick Benko, played by Rod Steiger in the 1956 film The Harder They Fall. In the 2016 film Hands of Stone, Carbo is portrayed by actor John Turturro.
