= Jack Raleigh =

Irish hurler

Personal information
- Native name: Seán Rálaigh (Irish)
- Born: 31 March 1890 Emly, County Tipperary, Ireland
- Died: 1969 (aged 78–79)
- Occupation: Farmer

Sport
- Sport: Hurling
Club
- Years: Club
- Emly
Club titles
- Tipperary titles: 0
Inter-county
- Years: County
- 1913-1915: Tipperary
Inter-county titles
- Munster titles: 1
- All-Irelands: 0

John Raleigh (31 March 1890 – 1969) was an Irish hurler who played for the Tipperary senior team.

Raleigh made his first appearance for the team during the 1913 championship and was a regular member of the starting fifteen until he left the panel after the 1915 championship. During that time he won one Munster medal and one Croke Cup medal. Raleigh was an All-Ireland runner-up on one occasion.

At club level Raleigh played with Emly.
