= Art Aragon =

American boxer (1927–2008)

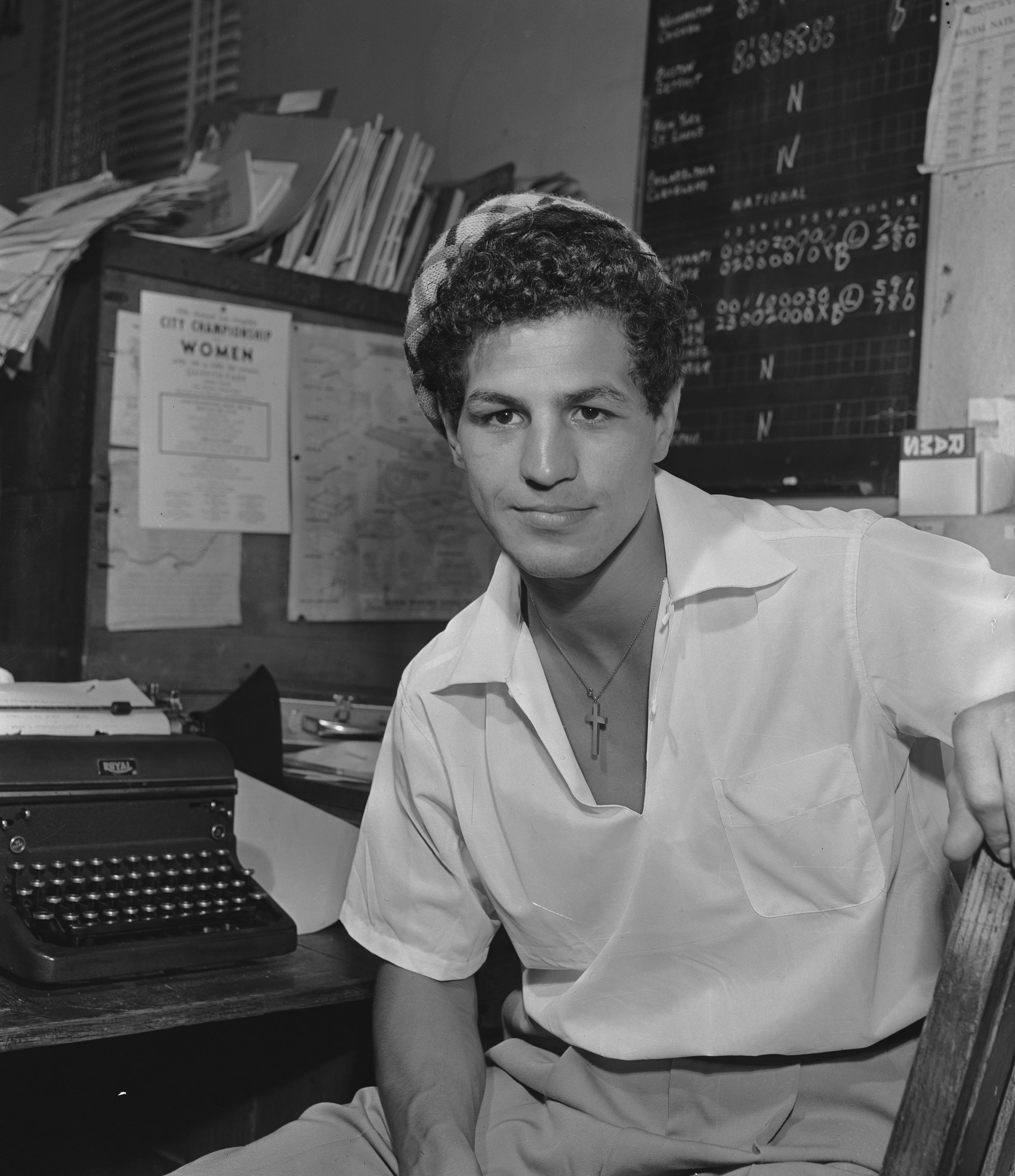

Personal information
- Nickname: Golden Boy
- Born: Arthur Benjamin Aragon; November 13, 1927 Belen, New Mexico, U.S.
- Died: March 25, 2008 (aged 80) Northridge, California, U.S.
- Height: 5 ft 9 in (178 cm)
- Weight: Lightweight

Boxing career
- Reach: 72 in (183 cm)
- Stance: Orthodox

Boxing record
- Total fights: 116
- Wins: 90
- Win by KO: 62
- Losses: 20
- Draws: 6

Arthur Benjamin Aragon (November 13, 1927 – March 25, 2008) was an American professional boxer and actor. Nicknamed "Golden Boy", he competed in the lightweight division from 1944 to 1960.

== Early life ==
Aragon was a native of Belen, New Mexico. Raised in poverty, he moved frequently during his childhood before his family settled in East Los Angeles when he was 15. He made his professional boxing debut a year later, lying about his age to get in the ring.

== Professional boxing career ==
Aragon's first professional fight, a points win in May 1944, was against Frenchy Rene at the Olympic Auditorium in Los Angeles. Aragon won his first eleven fights before dropping a decision to Bert White in October 1944. Aragon faced ever-tougher competition as his career progressed, eventually facing many of the great names from his era, including Tommy Campbell, Jesse Flores, Redtop Davis, Jimmy Carter and Carmen Basilio. Aragon also held victories over such men as Enrique Bolanos, Johnny Gonsalves, future lightweight champion Lauro Salas, future welterweight champion Don Jordan, Danny Giovanelli and Chico Vejar. In 1951, he defeated lightweight champion Carter in a non-title bout. Three months later he lost a rematch to Carter for the title in a bout in which he reportedly struggled to make weight. He defeated Carter once again five years later after Carter had been dethroned. Aragon retired in 1960 with a career record of 90 wins (61 by knockout), 20 losses, and 6 draws. Before his career ended, Aragon was dogged by accusations of conspiring to fix fights in his favor, including a conviction in California in February 1957. Similar allegations were made by other fighters afterwards but were never substantiated.

== Acting career ==
Aragon enjoyed popularity among Hollywood circles. He was romantically linked to Marilyn Monroe, Jayne Mansfield and other Hollywood starlets of the era. Another Hollywood connection was Aragon's friendship with World War II hero turned Western star Audie Murphy. He had various film and television credits between the 1950s and 1970s, including appearances as himself in the boxing films The Ring and Off Limits, and he played the role of Private Sanchez in the 1955 war film To Hell and Back.

He can be heard as a contestant on the 24th May 1950 radio episode and seen in the 25th October 1956 TV edition of You Bet Your Life.

== Later life ==
Aragon was married four times and engaged a fifth time. He had six acknowledged children.

After retiring from boxing, Aragon went into the bail bonds business and pursued acting roles. He converted to Judaism later in life and is buried in a Jewish cemetery in Los Angeles.

== Filmography ==
Year	Title	Role	Notes
1952	The Ring	Himself	
1952	Off Limits	Himself	
1954	Dragnet	Himself	Uncredited
1955	To Hell and Back	Sanchez	
1956	World in My Corner	Fighter	
1961	The Ladies Man	Minor Role	Uncredited
1972	Fat City	Babe	
1976	Joe Forrester (Episode "Pressure Point")	Oscar	
1979	Barnaby Jones (Episode "A Desperate Pursuit")	Fuzzy Moore	
