= Ross Virgo =

American boxer

Personal information
- Nationality: American
- Born: November 9, 1929
- Died: June 29, 2011 (aged 81)

Boxing career

Boxing record
- Total fights: 28
- Wins: 24
- Losses: 2
- Draws: 2

Ross Virgo (November 9, 1929 – June 29, 2011) was an American professional boxer.

He attended Franklin High School in Rochester, New York, where he first learned to box. After joining the Army, he became the combined Army–Air Force boxing champion. His amateur record was 46–2. His professional career started in 1948 and in the following year he was ranked 8th in the world by Ring Magazine. His career record as a pro was 24–2–2. At one time, he ranked fifth in the world in the welterweight class. He is a member of the Rochester Boxing Hall of Fame.

After retiring in 1953, he married and opened a restaurant in Rochester called the Dickens (after Charles Dickens).
