= Duane Horsman =

American boxer

Duane D. Horsman (January 23, 1937 – July 1991), was a middleweight professional boxer from Minnesota.

== Personal life ==
Horsman was a native of Chatfield, Minnesota.

== Professional career ==
In a career that spanned from 1959 to 1970, Duane Horsman amassed a record of 48 wins (34 by knockout) and 13 losses, with 2 draws. He began his career with 12 straight wins and was undefeated after 20 fights. Before his career was over he had fought such notable opponents as Clarence Cook, Sugar Boy Nando, Del Flanagan, Art Hernandez, Pat O'Connor.
