= Glen Flanagan =

American boxer

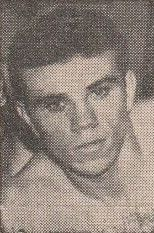
Glen Flanagan - 8 December 1949 Minneapolis Auditorium Boxing Program (cropped)

Glen Flanagan (November 16, 1926 – January 28, 1979) was a featherweight professional boxer from Minnesota.

== Personal life ==
Glen Flanagan was born and raised in St Paul, Minnesota. He and his wife Betty had six children, and Glen went on to have a successful career in insurance and real estate. Flanagan also ran for the city council of St Paul and owned a bar and two restaurants. He also tried his hand at farming in his later years, and dabbled as a promoter, manager, and trainer at different times.

== Professional career ==
In a career that lasted from 1946 until 1960, Glen Flanagan compiled a professional record of 83 wins (34 by knockout) and 23 losses, with 13 draws. Flanagan faced a number of notable opponents, including Miguel Acevedo, Jackie Graves, Charley Riley, Pat Iacobucci (three consecutive bouts), Ray Famechon (at Madison Square Garden), Jackie Blair, Gene Smith, Redtop Davis, Corky Gonzalez, Tommy Collins, Diego Sosa, Armand Savoie, Lulu Perez, Duilio Loi, and Eddie Chavez. Flanagan was a world rated fighter back when there were eight weight classes and one top ten for each weight class. Flanagan won the Minnesota featherweight, lightweight, and welterweight titles and fought for the world championship in the featherweight division against Tommy Collins in the Boston Garden in 1952, losing a close 15 round decision. Flanagan was rated 3rd in the world at the time when Sandy Sadler was in the army and the n.b.a was looking for a champion. Flanagan fought 10 times on national TV in the US and was responsible with his brother Del Flanagan and Jackie Graves for putting Minnesota on the national boxing map during the 1940s and 50s. was posthumously inducted into the World Boxing Hall of Fame in 2005 and the Minnesota Boxing Hall of Fame in 2010.
