= Pat O'Connor (boxer) =

American boxer (1950–2025)

Pat "Irish" O'Connor (1950 – May 23, 2025) was an American professional light heavyweight boxer from Rochester, Minnesota.

== Amateur career ==
At the age of 16 O'Connor won the 1967 Golden Gloves national welterweight championship.

== Professional career ==
O'Connor's first professional fight was a second-round knockout win against Muhammed Smith on June 6 of 1968. O'Connor ran his record to 12-0 before facing his first "name" opponent, fellow Minnesotan Duane Horsman. Despite breaking his hand during the bout, O'Connor outboxed Horsman for six rounds en route to a unanimous decision win. O'Connor would continue to win through the summer of 1972, finally suffering his first loss after 31 consecutive victories when Andy Kendall defeated him by technical knockout in the seventh round of a ten-round match. Despite the setback, O'Connor continued to fight regularly until March 1978, when he finally retired after losing three bouts in a row. O'Connor retired with a professional record of 41 wins and 6 losses, with 19 wins coming by way of a knockout.

== Death ==
O'Connor died from Parkinson's disease on May 23, 2025, at the age of 74.
