= Jackie Graves =

American boxer

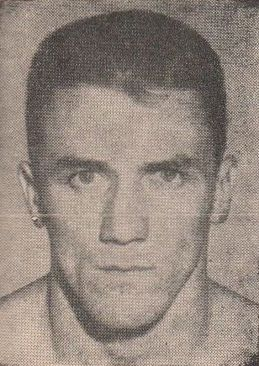
Jackie Graves -1949 Minneapolis Auditorium Boxing Program

Jackie Graves (September 12, 1922 – November 15, 2005), alias "The Austin Atom", was a featherweight boxer from Minnesota.

== Personal life ==
Graves was a native of Austin, Minnesota.

== Boxing career ==
From 1944 to 1956 Graves compiled a career record of 82 wins (48 KOs) and 11 losses with 2 draws. He won the Minnesota State Featherweight Title in only his seventh professional fight, and before his career was over he had fought boxers including Willie Pep, Glen Flanagan, Miguel Acevedo, Del Flanagan, Corky Gonzales and Redtop Davis.

== Against Willie Pep ==
Graves is named as the foil against whom Willie Pep won a round without throwing a punch. This occurrence is sometimes said to have taken place in the third round of a fight between the two. Contemporary reports, however, clearly indicate that Pep threw punches in the third round.

== After boxing ==
Graves was a correspondent for Ring Magazine for many years after his fighting career ended.
