= Mike Evgen =

American boxer

Mike Evgen, alias The Rice Street Rocker, is a retired welterweight professional boxer from Minnesota.

== Personal life ==
Mike Evgen, as his nickname implies, is from the Rice Street neighborhood in Saint Paul, Minnesota. At 5'6" tall, Evgen was unusually short for a welterweight fighter.

== Professional career ==
Evgen made his professional debut in January 1989 with a first round knockout of Rick Caldwell. He won his first 16 professional fights, losing for the first time to Terry Ford in June 1991. Nevertheless, Evgen continued to fight and to win, and by the time he fought for the IBO light welterweight championship in April 1992 he was sporting a 19–1 record. He defeated Louie Lomelli for that vacant title in a twelve-round split decision. Evgen relinquished the IBO title without defending it. Evgen's career continued until July 1997, when he suffered an unexpected third-round knockout loss to Steve Valdez. He retired with a record of 31 wins (13 by knockout) and 6 losses.

In 2012, his life story was featured in an independently produced documentary titled "the Rice Street Rocker." The documentary received favorable reviews, called "beautiful" by one Twin Cities media outlet.
