= MDW Tri-State Heavyweight Championship =

Professional wrestling championship

Details
- Promotion: Mason-Dixon Wrestling
- Date established: September 20, 1997
- Current champion(s): Vacant
- Date won: September 3, 2007
Statistics
- First champion(s): Buddy Rose
- Most reigns: Latin Tornado (2); Chick Scott (2); Mason Hunter (2)
- Longest reign: Punchy McGee (399 days)
- Shortest reign: Tony Nardo (<1 day)

The MDW Tri-State Heavyweight Championship is a professional wrestling secondary championship in Mason-Dixon Wrestling (MDW). It was the original television title of the Atlantic Coast Championship Wrestling promotion during its first year of operation. In December 1998, the promotion became Mason-Dixon Wrestling and the title was replaced by the MDW Tri-State Heavyweight Championship.

The inaugural champion was "Freebird" Buddy Rose, who defeated Bart Batten in New Martinsville, West Virginia on September 20, 1997 to become the first ACCW Television Champion. Latin Tornado, Chick Scott, and Mason Hunter are tied for the record of most reigns, with two each. At 399 days, Punchy McGee's first reign is the longest in the title's history. Tony Nardo's only reign was the shortest in the history of the title, lasting less than a day, losing the belt to Latin Tornado on the same night it was awarded to him. Overall, there have been 21 reigns shared between 15 wrestlers, with one vacancy.

== Title history ==
Key

| # | Order in reign history |
| Reign | The reign number for the specific set of wrestlers listed |
| Event | The event in which the title was won |
| — | Used for vacated reigns so as not to count it as an official reign |
| N/A | The information is not available or is unknown |
| + | Indicates the current reign is changing daily |

=== Names ===
| Name | Years |
|---|---|
| ACCW Television Championship | 1997 — 1998 |
| MDW Tri-State Heavyweight Championship | 1998 — 2002 |

=== Reigns ===
| # | Wrestlers | Reign | Date | Days held | Location | Event | Notes | Ref. |
|---|---|---|---|---|---|---|---|---|
| 1 | Buddy Rose | 1 | September 20, 1997 | 49 | New Martinsville, West Virginia | Live event | Rose defeated Bart Batten to become the first ACCW Television Champion. | |
| 2 | Mr. Attitude | 1 | November 8, 1997 | 35 | Kingwood, West Virginia | Live event | | |
| 3 | Scotty Blaze | 1 | December 13, 1997 | 144 | Buckhannon, West Virginia | Live event | | |
| 4 | Colonel Payne | 1 | May 6, 1998 | 87 | Clarksburg, West Virginia | Live event | | |
| 5 | T. Rantula | 1 | August 1, 1998 | 141 | Clarksburg, West Virginia | Live event | | |
| — | Deactivated | — | December 20, 1998 | — | N/A | N/A | The promotion was renamed Mason-Dixon Wrestling in December 1998, and the title was replaced by the MDW Tri-State Heavyweight Championship. | |
| 1 | Punchy McGee | 1 | March 13, 1999 | 399 | Nutter Fort, West Virginia | Live event | McGee defeated Bob Brown to become the first MDW Tri-State Heavyweight Champion. | |
| 2 | Chick Scott | 1 | April 15, 2000 | 49 | Morgantown, West Virginia | Live event | | |
| 3 | Latin Tornado | 1 | June 3, 2000 | 7 | Kingwood, West Virginia | Live event | | |
| 4 | Chick Scott | 2 | June 10, 2000 | 56 | Elkins, West Virginia | Live event | | |
| 5 | Tony Nardo | 1 | August 5, 2000 | 0 | Nutter Fort, West Virginia | Live event | Awarded title via forfeit. | |
| 6 | Latin Tornado | 2 | August 5, 2000 | 14 | Nutter Fort, West Virginia | Live event | | |
| 7 | Scotty McKeever | 1 | August 19, 2000 | 194 | Elkins, West Virginia | Live event | | |
| — | Vacated | — | March 1, 2001 | — | N/A | N/A | The championship is vacated when Scotty McKeever is stripped after failing to appear for scheduled title defenses. | |
| 8 | Lance Malinowski | 1 | March 10, 2001 | 175 | Morgantown, West Virginia | Live event | Malinowski won a battle royal to win the vacant title. | |
| — | Vacated | — | September 1, 2001 | — | N/A | N/A | The championship is vacated when Lance Malinowski is stripped after failing to appear for scheduled title defenses. | |
| 9 | Mason Hunter | 1 | September 29, 2001 | 146 | Morgantown, West Virginia | Live event | Hunter defeated Zubov to win the vacant title. | |
| 10 | Magnum | 1 | February 22, 2002 | 9 | Stonewood, West Virginia | Live event | This was a three-way title unification match also involving MDW Heavyweight Champion Brock Singleton. As a result of Magnum's victory, he holds the MDW Heavyweight and Tri-State titles in addition to the NWA Tri-State Championship. | |
| 11 | Mason Hunter | 2 | March 10, 2002 | 364 | Morgantown, West Virginia | Live event | This was a Three-Way Dance also involving Brock Singleton. On March 16, 2002, Hunter lost the NWA Tri-State Championship to Matt Vandal in Parkersburg, West Virginia. | |
| — | Vacated | — | September 3, 2003 | — | N/A | N/A | The championship is vacated when Mason Hunter is forced to relocate to the Midwestern United States due to commitments to the United States military. | |

== List of combined reigns ==
| <1 | Indicates that the reign lasted less than one day. |

| Rank (Note: Each reign is ranked highest to lowest; reigns with the same number mean that they are tied for that certain rank.) | Wrestler | # of reigns | Combined days |
|---|---|---|---|
| 1 | Mason Hunter | 2 | 510 |
| 2 | Punchy McGee | 1 | 399 |
| 3 | Chick Scott | 2 | 107 |
| 4 | Scotty McKeever | 1 | 194 |
| 5 | Lance Malinowski | 1 | 175 |
| 6 | Scotty Blaze | 1 | 144 |
| 7 | T. Rantula | 1 | 141 |
| 8 | Colonel Payne | 1 | 87 |
| 9 | Buddy Rose | 1 | 49 |
| 10 | Mr. Attitude | 1 | 35 |
| 11 | Latin Tornado | 2 | 21 |
| 12 | Magnum | 1 | 9 |
| 13 | Tony Nardo | 1 | <1 |
