= MDW Light Heavyweight Championship =

Professional wrestling championship

Details
- Promotion: Mason-Dixon Wrestling
- Date established: December 13, 1997
- Current champion(s): Latin Tornado
- Date won: June 15, 2002
Statistics
- First champion(s): Joey Austin
- Most reigns: The Bounty Hunter (4); Latin Tornado (2)
- Longest reign: Puck (336 days)
- Shortest reign: Latin Tornado (1 day)

The MDW Light Heavyweight Championship is a professional wrestling light heavyweight championship in Mason-Dixon Wrestling (MDW). It was the original lightweight title of the Atlantic Coast Championship Wrestling promotion during its first year of operation. In December 1998, the promotion became Mason-Dixon Wrestling and the title became the MDW Heavyweight Championship.

The inaugural champion was Joey Austin, who defeated Bobby Kane in Buckhannon, West Virginia on December 13, 1997 to become the first ACCW Light Heavyweight Champion. The Bounty Hunter and Latin Tornado are tied for the record for most reigns, with four each. At 336 days, Puck's first and only reign is the longest in the title's history. Latin Tornado's first reign was the shortest in the history of the title lasting only 1 day. Overall, there have been 13 reigns shared between 7 wrestlers, with three vacancies.

== Title history ==
Key

#	Order in reign history
Reign	The reign number for the specific set of wrestlers listed
Event	The event in which the title was won
—	Used for vacated reigns so as not to count it as an official reign
N/A	The information is not available or is unknown
+	Indicates the current reign is changing daily

=== Names ===
Name	Years
ACCW Light Heavyweight Championship	1997 — 1999
MDW Light Heavyweight Championship	1999 — 2002

=== Reigns ===
#	Wrestlers	Reign	Date	Days held	Location	Event	Notes	Ref.
1	Joey Austin	1	December 13, 1997	91	Buckhannon, West Virginia	Live event	Austin defeated Bobby Kane to become the first ACCW Light Heavyweight Champion.	
2	The Bounty Hunter	1	March 14, 1998	161	New Martinsville, West Virginia	Live event		
3	Red Devil	1	August 22, 1998	112	Buckhannon, West Virginia	Live event		
4	The Bounty Hunter	2	December 12, 1998	193	Buckhannon, West Virginia	Live event	This was a Triangle match also involving The Cuban Commando. On January 1, 1999, the title was renamed the MDW Light Heavyweight Championship when the promotion became Mason-Dixon Wrestling.	
5	Latin Tornado	1	June 23, 1999	1	Franklin, West Virginia	Live event		
6	The Bounty Hunter	3	June 24, 1999	43	Moorefield, West Virginia	Live event		
7	Latin Tornado	2	August 6, 1999	271	Kingwood, West Virginia	Live event		
8	The Bounty Hunter	4	May 3, 2000	7	Stonewood, West Virginia	Live event		
9	El Guano	1	May 10, 2000	61	Stonewood, West Virginia	Live event		
—	Vacated	—	July 10, 2000	—	N/A	N/A	The championship is vacated when El Guano is "deported" by the Immigration and Naturalization Service for a work visa violation.	
10	J.T. Martin	1	August 5, 2000	118	Nutter Fort, West Virginia	Blackberry Festival (2000)	Martin defeated Puck to win the vacant title.	
—	Vacated	—	December 1, 2000	—	N/A	N/A	The championship is vacated after J.T. Martin suffers a career-threatening spine injury.	
11	Latin Tornado	3	March 10, 2001	N/A	Morgantown, West Virginia	Live event	Latin Tornado defeated Puck and King to win the vacant title.	
—	Vacated	—	June 2001	—	N/A	N/A	The championship is vacated when Latin Tornado fails to appear for scheduled title appearances.	
12	Puck	1	July 14, 2001	336	Stonewood, West Virginia	Live event	This was a Triple Threat match also involving Tommy Hawk and Lunar.	
13	Latin Tornado	4	June 15, 2002	N/A	Stonewood, West Virginia	Live event	Latin Tornado was awarded the championship when Puck left the promotion.	

== List of combined reigns ==
<1	Indicates that the reign lasted less than one day.

Rank (Note: Each reign is ranked highest to lowest; reigns with the same number mean that they are tied for that certain rank.)	Wrestler	# of reigns	Combined days
1	The Bounty Hunter	4	404
2	Puck	1	336
3	Latin Tornado	4	272+
4	J.T. Martin	1	118
5	Red Devil	1	112
6	Joey Austin	1	91
7	El Guano	1	61
