= List of professional wrestling promoters in the United States =

Professional wrestling promoters in the United States include:

== Pioneer-era (1900s–1940s) ==
This section lists notable professional wrestling promoters, especially those of the "Farmer" Burns-Frank Gotch and "Gold Dust Trio"-eras, active prior to the formation of the National Wrestling Alliance (NWA) in 1948.

- Dark Red indicates founding members of the National Wrestling Alliance.
- Light Red indicates later members of the National Wrestling Alliance.

| Ring name (Real name)^{[a]} | Life | Years active^{[b]} | Location | Promotion^{[c]}^{[d]} | Ref. |
|---|---|---|---|---|---|
| Heywood Allen | 1882–1958 | 1905–1949 | Louisville, Kentucky | Midwest Wrestling Alliance (1935–1947) | |
| Perry Bash | | 1941–1948 | Wichita, Kansas | | |
| Paul Bowser | 1886–1960 | 1910–1960 | Boston, Massachusetts | American Wrestling Association (1922–1960) | |
| Orville Brown | 1908–1981 | 1931–1957 | St. Louis, Missouri | Midwest Wrestling Association (1948–1963) | |
| Jim Crockett, Sr. | 1909–1973 | 1931–1973 | Charlotte, North Carolina | Jim Crockett Promotions (1931–1973) | |
| Price Daulton | | 1944–1945 | Tampa, Florida | | |
| Max Clayton | 1896-1957 | 1926–1957 | Omaha | National Wrestling Alliance (Omaha) (1948-1957) | |
| Jimmy Demetral (Dimitro Demetralis) | 1892–1978 | 1915–1973 | Madison, Wisconsin | International Wrestling Promotion (1924–1973) | |
| Ray Fabiani | 1889–1973 | 1923–1969 | Philadelphia | | |
| Clayton Fisher | 1909–1977 | 1938–1940 | Albuquerque, New Mexico | | |
| Pinkie George (Paul L. George) | 1904–1993 | 1931–1976 | Des Moines, Iowa | Midwest Wrestling Association; NWA Central States (1948–1958) | |
| Nick Gulas | 1915–1991 | 1937–1980 | Nashville, Tennessee | NWA Mid-America (1953–1980); Mid-South Wrestling Association / Mid-South Pro Wrestling (1982); South Wrestling (1982) | |
| Al Haft | 1886–1976 | 1914–1965 | Columbus, Ohio | Midwest Wrestling Alliance (1930–1948) | |
| Virgil Hamlin | | 1922–1957 | Portland, Oregon | Pacific Coast Wrestling (1922–1957) | |
| Chris Jordan | 1886-1940 | 1906–1940 | Birmingham, Alabama | Chris Jordan Promotions (1932–1940) | |
| Paul Jones | 1902–1988 | 1929–1984 | Atlanta, Georgia (GCW) | Georgia Championship Wrestling (1944–1984) | |
| Al Karasick | 1890–1965 | 1921–1962 | Honolulu, Hawaii | 50th State Big Time Wrestling (1936–1962) | |
| Gust Karras | 1902–1976 | 1918–1976 | St. Joseph, Missouri | Gust Karras Sports Promotions (1933–1948); NWA Central States (1949–1976) | |
| Fred Kohler (Fred Koch) | 1903–1969 | 1925–1965 | Chicago | NWA Chicago (1949–1963); International Wrestling Association (1963–1965) | |
| Doc Krone (John Krone) | 1873–1934 | 1896–1934 | Chicago | | |
| Harry Landry | | | Friars Point, Mississippi | National Wrestling Association (1932–1946) | |
| Harry Light | 1898–1971 | 1945–1965 | Detroit, Michigan | Harry Light Wrestling Office (1945–1948); NWA Detroit (1948–1958) | |
| Bob Luce (Robert A. Luce) | 1928–2007 | 1965–1989 | Chicago | American Wrestling Association (1965-1985); World Wrestling Association (1965–1989) | |
| Joe Malcewicz | 1897–1965 | 1922–1962 | San Francisco, California | NWA San Francisco (1949–1962) | |
| Sam Marbarger | | | Indianapolis, Indiana | National Wrestling Association | |
| Ed McLemore | 1905–1969 | 1940–1966 | Houston, Texas | Southwest Sports (1940–1966) | |
| Jess McMahon (Roderick J. McMahon) | 1882–1954 | 1915–1954 | Long Island, New York | Capitol Wrestling Corporation (1915–1954) | |
| Sam Muchnick (Jeshua Muchnick) | 1905–1998 | 1932–1982 | St. Louis, Missouri | St. Louis Wrestling Club (1942–1982) | |
| Toots Mondt (Joseph Raymond Mondt) | 1886–1976 | 1902–1965 | | World Wide Wrestling Federation (1963–1965) | |
| Tom Packs | 1894–1964 | 1922–1948 | St. Louis, Missouri | Tom Packs Sport Enterprises, Inc. (1922–1948) | |
| Jack Pfefer | 1894–1974 | 1924–1967 | New York City, New York; San Diego, California; Toledo, Ohio | | |
| Tex Porter (Franklin Porter) | 1907–1998 | 1927–1953 | Seattle, Washington | Pacific Coast Wrestling (1945–1953) | |
| Eddie Quinn | 1906–1965 | 1939–1963 | New England and Quebec | | |
| John Regus | 1917–1995 | | Memphis, Tennessee | NWA Mid-America (1953–1980) | |
| Bill Sallade | | 1945–1949 | Tampa, Florida | | |
| Morris Siegel | 1897–1966 | 1929–1966 | Houston, Texas | Southwest Sports (1929–1966) | |
| George Simpson | 1897–deceased | 1935–1964 | Kansas City, Missouri | NWA Central States (1948–1964) | |
| Tony Stecher (Anton Stecher) | 1889–1954 | 1933–1954 | Minneapolis, Minnesota | Minneapolis Boxing & Wrestling Club (1933–1948); NWA Minneapolis (1948–1954) | |
| George Tuohey | 1865-1927 | | Boston, Massachusetts | American Wrestling Association (1919–1922) | |
| Adam Weissmuller | 1899–1937 | 1930–1937 | Detroit, Michigan | | |
| Ed White | 1875–1955 | 1914–1943 | Chicago | National Wrestling Association (1919–1943) | |
| Bertram Willoughby | | | Dallas, Texas | Southwest Sports (1936–1940) | |

== Territory-era (1940s–1980s) ==
This section lists notable professional wrestling promoters during the "Golden Age of Professional Wrestling" following the creation of the National Wrestling Alliance (NWA) in 1948. While most promoters operated specific wrestling "territories" as members of the NWA, a number of so-called "outlaw" promotions were also prominent during this period.

- Dark Red indicates founding members of the National Wrestling Alliance.
- Light Red indicates members of the National Wrestling Alliance.
- Green indicates territory-era promoters who are still active.

| Ring name (Real name)^{[a]} | Life | Years active^{[b]} | Location | Promotion^{[d]} | Ref. |
|---|---|---|---|---|---|
| Dan Adams | | 1989–2010 | Wichita, Kansas | Sunflower State Wrestling (1989–2010) | |
| Billy Anderson | 1956– | 1974– | San Bernardino, California | Western States Wrestling Association (1988–1991); Empire Wrestling Federation (1996–) | |
| Ole Anderson | 1942–2024 | 1967–1993 | Atlanta, Georgia | Georgia Championship Wrestling (1976–1984) | |
| Max Andrews | | 1991–1992 | Dallas, Texas | Global Wrestling Federation (1991–1994) | |
| Bill Ash | 1946-2022 | 1980–1981 | Riverton, Wyoming | Rocky Mountain Wrestling (1980–1981) | |
| Lynn Austin (Ron Lendowski) | | | Panama City, Florida | Universal Wrestling Association (1985) | |
| Ron Barber | | 1994–1995 | Portland, Oregon | Oregon Pro Wrestling Federation (1994–1995) | |
| Bailey Barnes | | | | Professional Promotions (1976) | |
| Jack Barnett | | | New Jersey | Empire Wrestling Federation (1983–1985) | |
| Jim Barnett | 1924–2004 | 1949–2001 | Chicago Indianapolis, Indiana (NWA Indianapolis); Detroit, Michigan (AWA); Melbourne (WCW); Atlanta, Georgia (GCW) | NWA Indianapolis (1955–1960); American Wrestling Alliance (1959–1964); World Championship Wrestling (Australia) (1964–1974); Georgia Championship Wrestling (1973–1984) | |
| Fred Behrend | 1954– | 1985–1986 | San Antonio, Texas | Texas All-Star Wrestling (1985–1986) | |
| Barry Bernsten | 1943-2011 | 1973–1991 | Phoenix, Arizona | Universal Wrestling Association/Western States Wrestling Alliance (1973–1991) | |
| Jerry Blackwell | 1949–1995 | 1987–1990 | Atlanta, Georgia | Southern Championship Wrestling (1988–1990) | |
| Joe Blanchard | 1928–2012 | 1953–1985 | San Antonio, Texas | Southwest Championship Wrestling (1978–1985) | |
| Paul Boesch | 1912–1989 | 1932–1987 | Houston, Texas | Houston Wrestling (1966–1987) | |
| Marcial Bovee | 1958– | 1979– | Phoenix, Arizona | International Wrestling Union (1983) | |
| Larry Bowling | | 1989 | Logan, West Virginia | American International Wrestling (1989) | |
| Grace Brazil | | | | United Wrestling Association (1983) | |
| John Brammer | | 1990–1992 | Athens, Ohio | American Wrestling Federation (1990–1992) | |
| Don Brinton | 1927-2022 | 1979-1986 | Winnipeg, Manitoba, Canada | American Wrestling Association (1979-1986) | |
| Howard Brody | 1960–2022 | 1990–2001 | Fort Lauderdale, Florida | Ladies Major League Wrestling/Wild Women of Wrestling (1990–1993); NWA Florida (1990–2002); NWA Ring Warriors (2010) | |
| Robert J. Brooks | 1960– | 1989 | Bridgeview | Tri-State Wrestling (1989) | |
| Rusty Brooks | 1958–2021 | 1982–2013 | Davie, Florida | Independent Pro Wrestling Association (1988–2003) | |
| Killer Tim Brooks | 1947–2020 | 1969–1997 | Dallas–Fort Worth, Texas | North American Wrestling Alliance (1990–1991) | |
| Fritz Burns | | 1968–1994 | Lansing, Michigan | Wolverine Wrestling (1968–1977); Michigan Championship Wrestling (1977–1994) | |
| Richard Byrnes | 1950-2012 | | Malden, Massachusetts | New England Wrestling Federation / United States Wrestling Federation (1982–1985); Superstar Pro Wrestling (2004–) | |
| Frankie Cain | 1940-2010 | 1960-1985 | Bainbridge, Georgia | Star Wrestling (1982); American Wrestling Federation (1986); Star Cavalcade Wrestling (1988) | |
| George Cannon | 1932–1994 | 1953–1994 | Detroit, Michigan / Windsor, Ontario | Superstars of Wrestling / Canadian Wrestling Association (1976–1983) | |
| Dick Caricofe | 1941-2021 | 1988–2020 | Hagerstown, Maryland | National Wrestling League (1988–2020) | |
| Bill Carr | | | Southern California | Golden State Wrestling (1987) | |
| Tony Casta (John Castaldi) | 1938-2000 | 1975-2000 | St. Louis, Missouri | Mid-Missouri Wrestling Association (1985–) | |
| John Cazana | 1913–1986 | 1959–1974 | Knoxville, Tennessee | NWA Mid-America (1959–1974) | |
| Buddy Lee Cliff | 1939-2016 | | Rockford and Peoria | American Wrestling Association (1960-1978) | |
| Mike Collins | | | Columbus, Ohio | Ohio Championship Wrestling / All-Star Wrestling Alliance / American States Wrestling Alliance (1988–) | |
| Ricky Cortez | 1930-2008 | 1968–1994 | Lansing, Michigan | Wolverine Wrestling (1968–1977); Michigan Championship Wrestling (1977–1994) | |
| Glenwood Crocker | | 1987–1997 | Smithfield, North Carolina | Carolina Championship Wrestling Alliance (1987–1997) | |
| Jim Crockett, Jr. | 1944–2021 | 1973–1988 | Charlotte, North Carolina (JCP) | Jim Crockett Promotions (1973–1988); World Wrestling Network (1993) | |
| George Culkin | 1927–2005 | 1973–1988 | Jackson, Mississippi | International Championship Wrestling (1977–1979) | |
| Gil Culkin | | 1973–1988 | Jackson, Mississippi | International Championship Wrestling (1977–1979) | |
| Don Curtis | 1927–2008 | 1951–1981 | Jacksonville, Florida | World League Wrestling (1981) | |
| Gene Dargan | | 1962–? | Pittsburgh, Pennsylvania | Three Rivers Wrestling Association (1977–1979); Super-Pro Wrestling (1984) | |
| John Davenport | | | Florida | Professional Wrestling Alliance (1985) | |
| Bobby Davis | 1937–2021 | 1956–1971 | Dayton, Ohio | Wrestling Show Classics (1969–1970); Universal Wrestling Federation (1971) | |
| Sam DeCero | 1959– | 1988–2010 | Chicago | Windy City Wrestling (1988–2010) | |
| Bobby Dee (Bobby Gene Bearden) | 1942–2004 | | Huntsville, Alabama | South Wrestling (1982) | |
| Steve Devito | | | New York | International Championship Wrestling (1989) | |
| Dick the Bruiser (William Afflis) | 1929–1991 | 1971–1990 | Detroit, Michigan (1971–1974); Indianapolis, Indiana (1974–1990) | World Wrestling Association (1971–1990) | |
| Micky DiFate | | | Ardsley, New York | New Independent Wrestling Association (1984–1985) | |
| Mike Donatelli | | 1985–1995 | Pittsburgh, Pennsylvania | North American Wrestling (1986–1995) | |
| Johnny Doyle | 1909–1969 | 1936–1968 | Los Angeles (NWA Los Angeles); Detroit (AWA); Melbourne (WCW) | NWA Los Angeles (1936–1954); American Wrestling Alliance (1959–1964); World Championship Wrestling (Australia) (1964–1968) | |
| D. C. Drake (Don Drake) | 1957– | 1978–1991 | Lehigh Valley, Pennsylvania | National Wrestling Federation (1986–1994) | |
| Joe Dusek | 1910–1992 | 1934–1972 | Omaha, Nebraska | National Wrestling Alliance - Omaha (1957-1959); American Wrestling Association (1960-1983) | |
| Chief Jay Eagle (Jerry Bragg) | 1953– | 1977–2011 | Lenoir, North Carolina (SCW); Kings Mountain, North Carolina (NCW); Union, South Carolina; Spartanburg, South Carolina (APW) | Southern Championship Wrestling (1983–1990); National Championship Wrestling (1990–1993); Big Time Wrestling (1993–1998); American Pro Wrestling (1998–) | |
| Cal Eaton | 1908–1966 | 1942–1966 | Los Angeles | World Wrestling Association (1954–1966) | |
| Dale Edwards (George Hill) | 1948–2006 | 1971–2006 | Quad Cities, Iowa/Illinois | Midwest Championship Wrestling (1984–1986) | |
| Russ Edwards | | | Memphis, Tennessee | Mid-South Wrestling Association / Mid-South Pro Wrestling (1982) | |
| Joe Eugenio | | 1988– | New Bedford, Massachusetts | New England Wrestling Association (1988–1993); Yankee Pro Wrestling (1994–2000) | |
| Ed Farhat | 1924–2003 | 1949–1998 | Detroit, Michigan | NWA Detroit (1964–1980) | |
| Woody Farmer | 1935–2012 | 1963–2008 | San Francisco, California | Bay Area Wrestling (1989–1992) | |
| Al Fenn | 1919–2008 | 1953–1973 | Phoenix, Arizona | World Athletic Association (1954–1973) | |
| Don Fields (Donald Wayne Hatfield) | 1932–2012 | 1959–1978 | Dothan, Alabama | Gulf Coast Wrestling Association (1959–1978) | |
| Lee Fields (Albert Lee Hatfield) | 1930–2000 | 1948–1974 | Dothan, Alabama | Gulf Coast Wrestling Association (1959–1978) | |
| Francis Flesher | | 1964–1980 | Detroit, Michigan | NWA Detroit (1964–1980) | |
| Bob Fradd | | | Ohio | Ohio Championship Wrestling (1984–1985) | |
| Ed Francis | 1926–2016 | 1946–1979 | Honolulu, Hawaii | 50th State Big Time Wrestling (1962–1979) | |
| Buddy Fuller (Buddy Welch) | 1925–1996 | 1951–1981 | | Gulf Coast Championship Wrestling (1953–1959) | |
| Robert Fuller (Robert Welch) | 1950– | 1970– | | NWA Southeastern Championship Wrestling (1974–1980); USA Wrestling (1987–1988) | |
| Ron Fuller | 1947- | 1974–1989 | Knoxville, Tennessee | NWA Southeastern Championship Wrestling (1974–1980); Continental Championship Wrestling (1986–1988); Continental Wrestling Federation (1988–1989) | |
| Charlie Fulton (Gary L. Fulton) | 1949–2016 | 1968–1985 | Mansfield, Ohio | Ohio Championship Wrestling / All-Star Wrestling Alliance / American States Wrestling Alliance (1988–unknown) | |
| Dory Funk | 1919–1973 | 1946–1973 | Amarillo, Texas | NWA Western States Sports (1953–1973) | |
| Verne Gagne | 1926-2015 | 1959–1991 | Minneapolis, Minnesota | Minneapolis Boxing & Wrestling Club (1959-1991); NWA Minneapolis (1959-1960); American Wrestling Association (1960-1991) | |
| Dennis Galamb | 1946-2012 | 1985–1990 | Woodbridge, New Jersey | Universal Wrestling Alliance (1985–1990) | |
| Bob Geigel | 1924–2014 | 1950–1988 | Kansas City, Missouri | NWA Central States (1963–1986; 1988); World Wrestling Alliance (1988) | |
| Ron Garvin (Roger Barnes) | 1945– | 1962–2003 | Knoxville, Tennessee | All-Star Championship Wrestling (1979–1980); Tennessee Mountain Wrestling (1995–2001); Ron's Championship Wrestling (2002–2003) | |
| Phil Golden | | | Paducah, Kentucky | All-Star Wrestling (1972–1974) | |
| David Gould | | 1980–1981 | Boise, Idaho | Diamond Belt Championship Wrestling (1980–1981) | |
| Eddie Graham (Edward Gossett) | 1930–1985 | 1947–1985 | Tampa, Florida | Championship Wrestling from Florida (1970–1985) | |
| Mike Graham (Michael Gossett) | 1951–2012 | 1972–1992 | Tampa, Florida | Florida Championship Wrestling (1988–1989); Professional Wrestling Federation (1989–1991) | |
| Jerry Grey | 1963–2026 | 1981–2026 | Clermont, Florida | Southern Wrestling Federation (1988–1993); World Pro Wrestling (1994–) | |
| John Guglyn | | | Winnipeg, Manitoba, Canada | American Wrestling Association (1960-1986) | |
| Ann Gunkel | 1936–1987 | 1972–1974 | Atlanta, Georgia | All South Wrestling Alliance (1972–1974) | |
| Jody Hamilton | 1938–2021 | 1955–1988 | McDonough, Georgia | Deep South Wrestling (1986–1988) | |
| Gary Hart | 1942–2008 | 1963–2004 | Dallas, Texas | Texas Wrestling Federation (1990–1991); World Class II: The Next Generation (1997) | |
| Billy Jack Haynes (William Haynes III) | 1953– | 1982–1996 | Portland, Oregon | Oregon Wrestling Federation (1988); Oregon Pro Wrestling Federation (1994) | |
| Mark Henderson | | 1982–2000 | Lenoir, North Carolina | North American Wrestling Alliance (1982–2000) | |
| Jesse Hernandez | 1950– | 1981– | San Bernardino, California | Western States Wrestling Association (1988–1991); Empire Wrestling Federation (1996–) | |
| Dwaine Hoberg | 1925-1984 | 1960-1984 | Fargo/Moorhead | American Wrestling Association (1960-1984) | |
| Johnny Hunter | 1945–1989 | 1966–1989 | Lexington, North Carolina | Eastern Wrestling Association (1974–1989) | |
| Tom Janette | | 1983–1993 | New Haven, Connecticut | Northeast Championship Wrestling (1983–1993) | |
| Jerry Jarrett | 1942–2023 | 1965–2005 | Memphis, Tennessee | Continental Wrestling Association (1977–1989); United States Wrestling Association (1988–1997); Total Non-Stop Action (2002–2005) | |
| Paul Jones (Paul Frederick) | 1942–2018 | 1968–1992 | Charlotte, North Carolina | South Atlantic Pro Wrestling (1990–1992) | |
| Dexter Justice-Smithfield | | 1987–1997 | Smithfield, North Carolina | Carolina Championship Wrestling Alliance (1987–1997) | |
| Wally Karbo | 1915-1993 | 1952–1985 | Minneapolis, Minnesota | Minneapolis Boxing & Wrestling Club (1952-1985); NWA Minneapolis (1952-1960); American Wrestling Association (1960-1985) | |
| Craig Kay | | 1990–1993 | Fort Lauderdale, Florida | Ladies Major League Wrestling/Wild Women of Wrestling (1990–1993) | |
| Steve Keirn | 1951– | 1972–2013 | Tampa, Florida | Florida Championship Wrestling (1988–1989); Professional Wrestling Federation (1989–1991); Florida Championship Wrestling (2007–2013) | |
| Jerry Kennett | 1954– | 1978–1993 | Smithfield, North Carolina | Carolina Championship Wrestling Alliance (1987–1997) | |
| Duke Keomuka | 1921–1991 | 1947–1991 | Tampa, Florida | Championship Wrestling from Florida (1985–1987) | |
| Lou Kokley | | 1989–1994 | Euclid, Ohio | Great Lakes Wrestling Association (1989–1994) | |
| Killer Kowalski (Walter Kowalski) | 1926–2008 | 1947–2008 | Reading, Massachusetts | International Wrestling Federation (1979–1996) | |
| Jim Lancaster | 1954– | 1981–1992; 2004 | Jackson Center, Ohio | Midwest Championship Wrestling (1981–1992) | |
| Gloria Gale Lane | | 1991–1992 | Fresno, California | West Coast Wrestling Alliance (1991–1992) | |
| Karl Lauer | 1938-2022 | 1983–1990 | Los Angeles | California Pro Wrestling (1983–1990) | |
| Jerry Lawler | 1949– | 1970– | Memphis, Tennessee | United States Wrestling Association (1997) | |
| Gene LeBell | 1932–2022 | 1966–1982 | Los Angeles | NWA Hollywood Wrestling (1966–1982) | |
| Mike LeBell | 1930–2009 | 1966–1982 | Los Angeles | NWA Hollywood Wrestling (1966–1982) | |
| Sandy Lee | | 1987–1997 | Smithfield, North Carolina | Carolina Championship Wrestling Alliance (1987–1997) | |
| Dave Leehy | | 1988–1993 | Richmond, Virginia | Virginia Wrestling Association (1988–1993) | |
| Antone Leone | 1916–1994 | 1938–1982 | Southern California | Western States Alliance (1981–1982) | |
| Donn Lewin | 1926–2010 | 1950–1983 | Dayton, Ohio | Universal Wrestling Federation (1971) | |
| Mark Lewin | 1937– | 1953–1998 | Dayton, Ohio | Universal Wrestling Federation (1971) | |
| Louie the Lipp (Louis Lipp) | 1931–2005 | 1947–1977 | | | |
| Mike London | 1909–1989 | 1950–1979 | Albuquerque, New Mexico | NWA Western States Sports (1951–1979) | |
| Clarence Luttrall | 1906–1980 | 1949–1970 | Tampa, Florida | Championship Wrestling from Florida (1949–1970) | |
| John "Cyclone" Macalpine | d. 1965 | 1962-1964 | Winnipeg, Manitoba, Canada | American Wrestling Association (1962-1964) | |
| Boris Malenko (Lawrence Simon) | 1933–1994 | 1957–1994 | Knoxville, Tennessee (All-Star); Tampa, Florida | All-Star Championship Wrestling (1979–1980); IWWA (1984); Global Wrestling (1987–1988); Championship Wrestling Federation (1991) | |
| Dale Mann | 1939-2017 | 1968-2011 | Georgetown, Kentucky | Mountain Wrestling Association (1979–1995) | |
| Ken Mantell | | 1970–1991 | Dallas–Fort Worth, Texas | Wild West Wrestling (1987–1988); World Class Championship Wrestling (1988–1989) | |
| Pedro Martínez | 1915–1998 | 1950s–1970s | Buffalo, New York | National Wrestling Federation (1970–1974); International Wrestling Association (1975) | |
| Don Marxen | | | Moline and Davenport | American Wrestling Association (1963-1985) | |
| Jim Massingale | | 1987–1997 | Smithfield, North Carolina | Carolina Championship Wrestling Alliance (1987–1997) | |
| Hiro Matsuda | 1937–1999 | 1957–1987 | Tampa, Florida | Championship Wrestling from Florida (1985–1987) | |
| Rocky McGuire | d. 2008 | 1959–1978 | Dothan, Alabama | Gulf Coast Championship Wrestling (1968–1978) | |
| Leroy McGuirk | 1910–1988 | 1933–1982 | Tulsa, Oklahoma | NWA Tri-State (1958–1982) | |
| David McLane | | 1986–1992; 2000–2001 | Las Vegas (GLOW); Los Angeles (WOW) | Gorgeous Ladies of Wrestling (1986–1992); Women of Wrestling (2000–2001) | |
| Vince McMahon Sr. | 1914–1984 | 1954–1982 | | Capitol Wrestling Corporation (1954–1963); World Wide Wrestling Federation (1963–1982) | |
| Vince McMahon | 1945– | 1969–2022 | New York City, New York and the Northeast. Did not become National until the mid 1980s. NXT based in Orlando, Florida. | World Wrestling Federation/Entertainment/WWE (1982–2022): Raw (2002–2022); SmackDown (2002–2022); ECW (2006–2010); NXT (2012–2022) | |
| Peter Maivia | 1937–1982 | 1962–1982 | Honolulu, Hawaii | NWA Polynesian Wrestling (1979–1982) | |
| Lia Maivia | 1927–2008 | 1982–1988 | Honolulu, Hawaii | NWA Polynesian Wrestling (1982–1988) | |
| Denny Million | | | Rye Cove, Virginia | All-American Championship Wrestling (1988–1996) | |
| Bob Hamel | | 1983– | New Port Richey, Florida | All-American Championship Wrestling (1983–2013); AMP Wrestling (2013–) | |
| Ernie Mohammed | | 1954–1973 | Phoenix, Arizona | World Athletic Association (1954–1973) | |
| Jerry Monti | 1940–1999 | 1966–1994 | Hayward, California | Pacific Coast Championship Wrestling (1991–1992) | |
| Enzo Morabito | | | New Jersey | Empire Wrestling Federation (1983–1985) | |
| Freddie Morton | | | Columbia, Tennessee | Mid-South Wrestling Association (1991–1996) | |
| Mr. Ito (Umanosuke Ueda) | 1940–2011 | 1961–1998 | Mobile, Alabama | World Wrestling Organization (1988) | |
| Bill Needham | | | Knoxville, Tennessee | All Star Championship Wrestling (1990–1992) | |
| Wayne Oberton | | | | Professional Promotions (1976) | |
| Grady Odom | | | Macon, Georgia | All Star Championship Wrestling (1985); Georgia Championship Wrestling (2011–) | |
| Bob Orton Jr. | 1950– | 1972– | Knoxville, Tennessee | All-Star Championship Wrestling (1979–1980) | |
| Don Owen | 1912-2002 | 1957–1992 | Portland, Oregon | Pacific Northwest Wrestling (1957–1992) | |
| Joe Palumbo | | | San Bernardino, California | All-California Championship Wrestling (1987–1989) | |
| Ira Parks | | 1981–1990 | Columbia, South Carolina | Atlantic Coast Wrestling (1981–1990) | |
| Al Patterson | | 1979–1983 | Milwaukee, Wisconsin | Superstar Wrestling (1982); United Wrestling Association (1983) | |
| Joe Pedicino | 1949–2020 | 1986–1994 | Atlanta, Georgia (SCW/GASW); Dallas, Texas (GWF) | Southern Championship Wrestling (1988–1990); Georgia All-Star Wrestling (1990–1991); Global Wrestling Federation (1991–1992) | |
| Grey Pierson | | 1992–1994 | Dallas, Texas | Global Wrestling Federation (1992–1994) | |
| Angelo Poffo | 1925–2010 | 1949–1991 | Lexington, Kentucky | International Championship Wrestling (1978–1984) | |
| Buddy Porter | 1945–2005 | 1975–1995 | Kings Mountain, North Carolina | North American Wrestling Alliance (1982–1995) | |
| Henry Raines | | 1989–1993 | Bradenton, Florida | Suncoast Pro Wrestling (1989–1993) | |
| Bob Raskin | | | Lehigh Valley, Pennsylvania | National Independent Championship Wrestling (1985); National Wrestling Federation (1986–1988) | |
| Gene Reed | | | Denver, Colorado | American Wrestling Association (1963-1985) | |
| Roger Reed | | | | Universal Wrestling (1977) | |
| René Reyes | | | Ardsley, New York | New Independent Wrestling Association (1984–1985) | |
| Dusty Rhodes (Virgil Runnels Jr.) | 1945–2015 | 1968–2015 | Tampa, Florida (PWF); Marietta, Georgia (TCW) | Professional Wrestling Federation (1989–1991); Turnbuckle Championship Wrestling (2000–2003) | |
| Vince Risko (Vincent T. Pelkowski) | 1912–2002 | 1951–1977 | Canton, Ohio | | |
| Red Roberts | | | Boca Raton, Florida | Global Wrestling (1986–1988) | |
| Henry Robinson | | | Cleveland, Ohio | Ohio Championship Wrestling (1982) | |
| Johnny Rodz (John Rodriguez) | 1941– | 1964– | Brooklyn, New York | Camp IWF (1986–1990); World of Unpredictable Wrestling (2007–) | |
| Henry Rogers | 1930-2012 | 1963–1987 | Malden, Missouri | | |
| Bob Roop | 1947– | 1969–1988 | Knoxville, Tennessee (All-Star); Boca Raton, Florida (Global) | All-Star Championship Wrestling (1979–1980); Global Wrestling (1987–1988) | |
| David Rose | | | Phoenix, Arizona | Real Deal Pro Wrestling (2002–) | |
| Bob Ross | | | Hillsville, Virginia | American Championship Wrestling (1978–) | |
| Nelson Royal (Nelson Combs) | 1935–2002 | 1949–1991 | Mooresville, North Carolina | Atlantic Coast Wrestling (1988–1991) | |
| Bert Ruby (Bertalan Rubinstein) | 1910–1968 | 1933–1968 | | Wolverine Wrestling (1956–1967) | |
| Tony Rumble (Anthony Magliaro) | 1956–1999 | 1989–1999 | Boston, Massachusetts | Century Wrestling Alliance (1989–1997); NWA New England (1997–1999) | |
| Jim Ryan | | | Woodbridge, New Jersey | Universal Wrestling Alliance (1985–1990) | |
| Morris "Mushky" Salow | 1919-1996 | 1984–1985 | Springfield, Massachusetts | Northeast Wrestling Federation (1984–1985) | |
| Mike Samson | | | Castlewood, Virginia | United Wrestling Association (1989–1995) | |
| Raoul Sanchez | | 1980–1981 | Riverton, Wyoming | Rocky Mountain Wrestling (1980–1981) | |
| Dino Sanna | 1950– | 1981– | Colmar, Pennsylvania | World Wide Wrestling Alliance (1981–) | |
| Tony Santos, Sr. | 1922–1984 | 1960–1975 | Boston, Massachusetts | Big Time Wrestling (1960–1975) | |
| Angelo Savoldi | 1914–2013 | 1985–1995 | Boston, Massachusetts | International World Class Championship Wrestling (1985–1995) | |
| Mario Savoldi | | 1985–? | Boston, Massachusetts (IWCCW); Carolina, Puerto Rico (IWA); Mexico, Maine (NWA) | International World Class Championship Wrestling (1985–1995); International Wrestling Association (2008); NWA On Fire (2008–2011) | |
| Terry Scholl | 1958– | 1980–1995 | Chicago | Pro Wrestling International (1984–1995) | |
| Leonard Schwartz | | 1950–1955 | Chicago | NWA Chicago (1950–1955) | |
| George Scott | 1929–2014 | 1948–1992 | Charlotte, North Carolina | North American Wrestling Association/South Atlantic Pro Wrestling (1990–1992) | |
| Eddie Sharkey | 1936- | 1985– | Minneapolis, Minnesota | Pro Wrestling America (1985–1996) | |
| Larry Sharpe (Larry Weil) | 1951–2017 | 1974–2017 | Woodbury, New Jersey | World Wrestling Association (1989–1998) | |
| Eric Shaw | | | Culver City, California | International Wrestling Federation (1986–1990) | |
| Roy Shire | 1922–1992 | 1950–1981 | San Francisco, California | American Wrestling Alliance (1961–1968); NWA Big Time Wrestling (1968–1981) | |
| Dean Silverstone | 1946-2020 | 1958–1978 | Seattle, Washington | Superstar Championship Wrestling (1973–1978) | |
| Herb Simmons | | 1984- | East Carondelet, Illinois | Southern Illinois Championship Wrestling | |
| Ron Slinker (David Slinker) | 1945–2008 | 1977–1995 | Tampa, Florida | Intercontinental / International Championship Wrestling Alliance (1989–1995) | |
| Ken Spence | | | Greensboro, North Carolina | International Wrestling Alliance (1979–1997); New Dimension Wrestling (1997–2005) | |
| Ted Stanley | | | New Jersey | Eastern Wrestling Alliance (1985) | |
| Dennis Stecher | 1917-1977 | 1952–1959 | Minneapolis, Minnesota | Minneapolis Boxing & Wrestling Club (1952-1959); NWA Minneapolis (1952-1959) | |
| Dale Stepp | | | | Big Time Promotions (1982–1992) | |
| James Strange | | | Knoxville, Tennessee | Southern States Championship Wrestling (1986–1991); NWA Rocky Top (2005) | |
| Ben Sternberg | | | Rochester | American Wrestling Association (1960-1985) | |
| John Summers | | | Ohio | Tri-State Wrestling Association (1985–1986) | |
| Paul Swanger | | | Easton, Pennsylvania | East Coast Wrestling Federation (1983–1984) | |
| Lowell Takles | | | Bainbridge, Georgia | Star Cavalcade Wrestling (1988) | |
| Sue Takles | | | Bainbridge, Georgia | Star Cavalcade Wrestling (1988) | |
| Tugboat Taylor (Don Taylor) | 1945–2017 | 1980–2017 | | Texas All-Pro Wrestling (1989–1995) | |
| Mark Tendler | 1939–1990 | 1955–1986 | | World Wrestling Council (1986) | |
| Max Thrasher (Phil Livelsberger) | 1962- | 1987-2001 | Hanover, Pennsylvania | Atlantic Wrestling Federation (1988–1993) | |
| DA Thunder (Don Adams) | | | California | Pacific Coast Crown Championship Wrestling (1986–1987) | |
| Al Tomko | 1931-2009 | 1966-1989 | Winnipeg, Manitoba; Vancouver, British Columbia | American Wrestling Association (1966-1979); NWA All-Star Wrestling - Vancouver(1979-1989) | |
| Alexander Turk | 1906-1988 | 1946-1966 | Winnipeg, Manitoba | National Wrestling Association (1946-1949); National Wrestling Alliance (1949-1960); American Wrestling Association (1961-1962); National Wrestling Alliance (1963-1966) | |
| Jerry Vanover | | | Rye Cove, Virginia | All-American Wrestling (1988–1996) | |
| Jack Viles | | 1975–1977 | Lynn, Massachusetts | New England Wrestling Alliance (1975–1977) | |
| Fritz Von Erich (Jack Adkisson) | 1929–1997 | 1958–1990 | Dallas–Fort Worth, Texas | NWA Big Time Wrestling (1966–1981); World Class Championship Wrestling (1981–1990) | |
| Fred Ward | 1914–1992 | 1937–1984 | Macon, Georgia | Georgia Championship Wrestling (1949–1984) | |
| Bill Wasserman | | | New Brighton, Minnesota | Western Wrestling Association (1988–) | |
| Bill Watts | 1939– | 1963–1993 | Tulsa, Oklahoma | Mid-South Wrestling (1979–1986); Universal Wrestling Federation (1986–1987) | |
| Joe Weaver | | | Euclid, Ohio | Great Lakes Wrestling Association (1989–1994) | |
| Roy Welch | 1902–1977 | 1935–1977 | Nashville, Tennessee | NWA Mid-America (1953–1977) | |
| James Wells | | | Burlington, North Carolina | North American Wrestling Alliance (1980–1999) | |
| Sam Wells | | | | United Wrestling Association (1983) | |
| Dennis Wildberger | | 1989–1993 | Baltimore | Wrestling Independent Network (WIN) (1989–1993) | |
| Eddie Williams | | 1963-1985 | St. Paul | American Wrestling Association (1963-1985) | |
| David Woods | | | Knoxville, Tennessee | USA Wrestling (1987–1988) | |
| Ed Zohn | | 1983– | York, Pennsylvania | Atlantic States Wrestling Alliance / Mid-Atlantic Wrestling Alliance (1989–1991); Universal Independent Wrestling (1991–1994); American Commonwealth Wrestling (1993–1995) | |

== Modern-era (1990s–present) ==
This section lists notable professional wrestling promoters from the collapse of the National Wrestling Alliance territory system in the early 1990s up to the 21st century.

| Ring name (Real name)^{[a]} | Life | Years active^{[b]} | Location | Promotion^{[d]} | Ref. |
|---|---|---|---|---|---|
| Roger Abshire | | | Hendersonville, North Carolina | National Wrestling Federation (1993–1997) | |
| Kevin Acres | | | Wartburg, Tennessee | Cumberland Wrestling Council (1991–1999) | |
| Chris Adams | 1955–2001 | 1978–2001 | Dallas, Texas | World Class Championship Wrestling (1993) | |
| Dan Adams | | | Wichita, Kansas | American Championship Wrestling (1997–1998) | |
| Don Adams | | | Reading, Pennsylvania | Penn York All Star Professional Wrestling (1996–1999) | |
| Richard Adcock | | | Mission, Texas | World Class Wrestling Federation (1995–1996) | |
| Shelby Adcock | 1937–2009 | 1961–1993 | Central City, Kentucky | Tri-State Wrestling (1991–1993) | |
| Edward Ahrens | | 1989–1998 | Los Angeles | American Independent Wrestling Alliance (1989–1998) | |
| Skandor Akbar | 1934–2010 | 1962–2010 | East Texas | Superstars of Wrestling (1998–2001) | |
| David Allen | | | Wilmington, North Carolina | Coastal Carolina Wrestling Alliance / Carolina Wrestling Federation (1991–1994) | |
| Terry Allen | | | Reading, Massachusetts | Big Time Wrestling (2006–) | |
| Roland Alexander | 1954–2013 | 1991–2013 | Hayward, California | Pacific Coast Sports (1991–1995); All Pro Wrestling (1995–2013) | |
| William Almas | 1975–2002 | 1994–2002 | New Port Richey, Florida | World Professional Wrestling Federation (1994–2000) | |
| Mark Amaral | | 1991– | Pawtucket, Rhode Island | Power League Wrestling (1991–) | |
| Angel Amoroso | | 1994–1997 | Philadelphia | Tri-County Wrestling (1994–1997) | |
| Cliff Anderson | | 1990–2004 | Tampa, Florida | Florida Wrestling Alliance (1996–2004) | |
| Lars Anderson (Larry Heinemi) | 1939– | 1965– | Honolulu, Hawaii | World League Wrestling (1996–2000) | |
| Christopher Annon | 1971– | 1996– | Kings Mountain, North Carolina | New Age Championship Wrestling (1998–1999) | |
| Joshua Annon | | | Kings Mountain, North Carolina | New Age Championship Wrestling (1998–1999) | |
| Afa Anoaʻi | 1942–2024 | 1971–2014 | Allentown, Pennsylvania | World Xtreme Wrestling (1998–) | |
| Greg Anthony | 1981– | 2012– | West Tennessee | Pro Wrestling Mid South (1997–) | |
| Jim Anthony | | | Columbus, Georgia | United Championship Wrestling (1998–2002) | |
| Tom Anthony | | | New Britain, Connecticut | Wrestlepalooza (1997) | |
| Tony Anthony | 1960– | 1980– | Knoxville, Tennessee | Tennessee Mountain Wrestling (2001–) | Clarence Santini 1997- 2000 Murfreesboro, Tn New Age Wrestling Alliance |
| Paul Alperstein | | 1994–1996 | Chicago | American Wrestling Federation (1994–1996) | |
| Chad Appling | | | Franklin, Kentucky | Central Wrestling Federation (1997–2000) | |
| Richard Arpin | | | Parkersburg, West Virginia | NWA of West Virginia (1998–2002); NWA Tri-State (1998–2007) | |
| Kim Artlip | 1963- | 2015- | Vero Beach, FL | IGNITE Wrestling (2015-) | |
| Bill Ash | 1946–2022 | 1972–2006 | Paris, Arkansas | Inter-Continental Pro Wrestling (1995–1999); Global Pro Wrestling (1999–2006) | |
| Marc Ash (Marcus Watkins) | 1971– | 1989– | Wilmington, North Carolina | Independent Championship Wrestling (1992–2005) | |
| Johnny Attiude (John Greene) | 1965–2018 | 1994-2011 | Hudson, Florida | Micro Championship Wrestling (2011) | |
| Marty Aulicino | | | Levittown, Pennsylvania | Ultimate Wrestling Federation (1991–2002) | |
| Isaias Aviles | | | Philadelphia | Grande Wrestling Alliance (1997–1999) | |
| Linda Bade | | | Honolulu, Hawaii | Hawai'i Championship Wrestling (2003–2008) | |
| Howard Badecker | | 1992–1993 | Bullhead City, Arizona | Interwest Wrestling Federation (1992–1993) | |
| Joey Baglia | | | Chicago | American Wrestling Federation (1995–1996) | |
| Bob Bailey | | | Elmira, New York | United States Wrestling Federation (1995–2000) | |
| Ron Barber | | 1994 | Portland, Oregon | Oregon Professional Wrestling Federation (1994) | |
| Sandy Barr | 1938–2007 | 1957–2007 | Portland, Oregon | Championship Wrestling USA (1992–1997) | |
| Buffalo Jim Barrier | 1953–2008 | 1994-1998 | Las Vegas, Nevada | National Wrestling Conference (1994–1998) | |
| Jeremy Barron | | 2000– | Southbridge, Massachusetts | Eastern Wrestling Alliance (2003–) | |
| Don Basher (Ron Owens) | 1960– | 1985– | Indianapolis, Indiana | Wild Championship Wrestling Outlaws (1997–) | |
| Harold Bass | | | Asheville, North Carolina | Atlantic Coast Championship Wrestling (1997–2003) | |
| Chris Bassett | | | Appleton, Wisconsin | New Age Wrestling (1989–1997); Packerland Pro Wrestling (1998) | |
| Rick Bassman | 1961– | 1985– | Santa Ana, California | Ultimate Pro Wrestling (1998–2007) | |
| David Baucom | | 1999– | Charlotte, North Carolina | NWA Mid-Atlantic Championship Wrestling (1999–) | |
| Court Bauer | 1978– | 1998– | Philadelphia | Major League Wrestling (2002–2005; 2017–) | |
| Fred Baxter | | | Memphis, Tennessee | Cable Championship Wrestling (1994–1996) | |
| James Beard | | 1995–1997 | Dallas, Texas | Confederate Wrestling Association (1995–1996); Continental Wrestling Alliance (1996–1997) | |
| Ed Beckley | | | Bridgeport, Texas | Bad Boys of Wrestling (1998–2000) | |
| Bill Behrens | | | Nashville, Tennessee (MCW); Cornelia, Georgia (NWA-WW/NWA-WS) | Music City Wrestling (1997–1998); NWA Worldwide (1998–2000); NWA Wildside (2000–2005) | |
| Joe Benkowski | | | Lakeville, Minnesota | Northern Premier Wrestling (1995–1998) | |
| Rod Bell (Rod Bollenbacher) | | | Hammond, Indiana | Nu Wave Wrestling Association (1996–1999) | |
| Andrew Bellamy | | | Wilmington, North Carolina | Coastal Carolina Wrestling Alliance / Carolina Wrestling Federation (1991–1994) | |
| Don Belt | | | Olive Hill, Kentucky | Eastern U.S. Championship Wrestling (1992–1994) | |
| Tor Berg | | 1989-2000 | Laughlin, Nevada | Ladies Professional Wrestling Association (1989-1992, 1998-2000) | |
| Scott Bickley | | | Jacksonville, Florida | Insane Wrestling Alliance (1996–2003) | |
| Big Slam (Walt McDonald) | 1966–2020 | 1989–2020 | Gloucester City, New Jersey | Slam Championship Wrestling (2010–2012) | |
| Randy Blake | | | Providence, Rhode Island | Mayhem Independent Wrestling (1998–2000) | |
| The Blue Meanie (Brian Heffron) | 1973– | 1995– | Philadelphia | Pro-Pain Pro Wrestling (2002–2005) | |
| Mark Bodey | 1968–1994 | 1993–1994 | York, Pennsylvania | American Commonwealth Wrestling (1993–1994) | |
| Mike Bonomo | | | Bourbonnais, Illinois | World Wrestling Association (1999–2000) | |
| Booker T (Booker Huffman) | 1965– | 1989– | Houston, Texas | Pro Wrestling Alliance (2006–) | |
| Lou Bordeaux | | 1994 | Haverhill, Massachusetts | Universal Championship Wrestling (1994) | |
| Joel Andre Bouchard | | | Waterville, Maine | Top Quality Wrestling (2007–2012) | |
| J.J. Bowers | | | Fort Wayne, Indiana | Championship International Wrestling Alliance (1998–1999) | |
| Cody Boyns | | 1992 | Nashua, New Hampshire | Universal Championship Wrestling (1992) | |
| Donald Brackens | 1969-2012 | | Louisville, Kentucky | Ohio Valley Wrestling | |
| Gerald Bradbury | | | Fairfield, Ohio | Real Deal Pro Wrestling (1997–1999) | |
| Mark Bradley | | | Summerville, Georgia | Powerhouse Wrestling (1994) | |
| Steve Bradley (Steve Bisson) | 1975–2008 | 1991–2008 | Dover, New Hampshire | Wrestling Federation of America (2003–2004) | |
| Kevin Brannen | | | Alabama | IWA Deep South (2005–) | |
| Marlene Breegle | | | West Mifflin, Pennsylvania | Penn Atlantic Wrestling (1997–1998); Victory World Wrestling (1998–1999) | |
| Bubba Brewer (Ken Brewer) | 1971– | 1998– | Commodore, Pennsylvania | Allied Powers Wrestling Federation (2003–2011) | |
| Sean Brockmole | | | | New American Wrestling (1993–1994) | |
| Don Brodie | | | Cleveland, Mississippi | South's Greatest Wrestling Fans (1998–1999); NWA Mississippi (1999–) | |
| John Brody | | | Fort Pierce, Florida | Florida Wrestling Alliance (1994–1995) | |
| Donald Brower | | 2003– | Wilmington, North Carolina | United Professional Wrestling Association (2005–) | |
| Bill Brown | 1954– | | Cutler Ridge, Florida | Sunshine Wrestling Federation (1991–1998); Florida Championship Wrestling (1998–) | |
| Carral Brown | | | St. Louis, Missouri | Central Championship Wrestling (1992–2000) | |
| Elizabeth Brown | | | Cleveland, Ohio | Masterz of Mayhem (1994–) | |
| Kurt Brown | | | Los Angeles | Great American Mat Endeavors (1995–1996) | |
| Mike Brown | | | Cleveland, Ohio | Masterz of Mayhem (1994–) | |
| Patricia Brown | | | Palmers, Minnesota | Western Wrestling Association (1988–) | |
| Paul Brown | | | Porterville, California | West Coast Wrestling Alliance (1992–1997) | |
| Steve Bryant | | | McMinnville, Tennessee | Hardcore Championship Wrestling (1996–1998); Southern Tennessee Wrestling (1998–1999) | |
| Don Bucci | | | Toms River, New Jersey | Phoenix Championship Wrestling (2001–2003) | |
| King Kong Bundy (Christopher Pailles) | 1957–2019 | 1981–2007 | Sewell, New Jersey | Devastation Wrestling Federation (2004–2006) | |
| Tim Burke | 1960–2011 | 1991–2009 | Essex, Maryland | Mid-Eastern Wrestling Federation (1992–2004) | |
| Mike Burns | | | Palo Alto, Pennsylvania | Future Wrestling Alliance (1998–2000) | |
| Al Burzynski | | | Columbus, Ohio | Capital City Wrestling (1999) | |
| Tom Byron | 1961- | | Sherman Oaks, California | Xtreme Pro Wrestling (1999–2003) | |
| Eric Caiden | | | San Francisco, California | Incredibly Strange Wrestling (1995–) | |
| Tim Calhoun | | | Hendersonville, North Carolina | National Wrestling Federation (1993–1996) | |
| Scotty Campbell | | 2022– | Mountain City, Tennessee | Beside The Ring (2022-) | |
| Arik Cannon | 1981– | 2001– | Minneapolis, Minnesota | F1rst Wrestling (2007–) | |
| Jeff Capo | 1966– | 1993–2008 | York, Pennsylvania | American Commonwealth Wrestling (1993–1995) | |
| Tony Capone (Anthony Dellamura) | 1965- | 1990-1999 | Mount Vernon, New York | North American Westling Alliance (1992–1999) | |
| Cueball Carmichael (Chris Jackson) | 1960– | 1983– | Chincoteague, Virginia | Independent Professional Wrestling Alliance (1995–2001) | |
| Ken Carpenter | | | Maynardville, Tennessee | Tri-State Wrestling (1998–1999) | |
| Lynn Carpenter | | | Maynardville, Tennessee | Tri-State Wrestling (1998–1999) | |
| Joey Carrier | | | Elizabethton, Tennessee | Tennessee Championship Wrestling (1992–1995) | |
| Gino Caruso (James Carullo) | 1963– | 1988– | Lake Hiawatha, New Jersey | East Coast Professional Wrestling (1991–) | |
| Rico Casanova (Jorge Luis Maldonado) | 1968– | 1992– | Pawleys Island, South Carolina | Atlantic Wrestling Federation (1994) | |
| Nick Castantini | | 1993 | Seekonk, Massachusetts | Coastal Pro Wrestling (1993) | |
| Mike Cavanaugh | | | Lumberton, North Carolina | All-Star Championship Wrestling (1992–1993) | |
| Grant Chapman | | 1992–1993 | Bullhead City, Arizona | Interwest Wrestling Federation (1992–1993) | |
| Ed Chuman | 1947–2010 | | Streamwood, Illinois | NWA Midwest (1998–2010) | |
| Jeff Cohen | | | Indianapolis, Indiana | Championship Wrestling of America (1994) | |
| Scott Cole | | 1992–1994 | San Bernardino, California | Coast to Coast Wrestling Federation / Golden State Wrestling (1992–1994) | |
| Bob Coley | | | Hague, Virginia | Southern Wrestling Association (1991–1994) | |
| Norm Connors | 1972– | 1994–2009 | Pittsburgh, Pennsylvania | Steel City Wrestling (1994–2000); International Wrestling Cartel (2001–2009) | |
| Pat Connors | | | Newport News, Virginia | Continental Wrestling Alliance (1993–1994) | |
| Sal Conte | | 1993–1998 | Washington, Pennsylvania | United States Championship Wrestling (1993–1998) | |
| Leroy Cook | | | Osceola, Arkansas | American Wrestling Federation (1999–2000) | |
| Dennis Coralluzzo | 1953–2001 | 1993–2001 | | Galaxy Wrestling Federation (1993); NWA New Jersey (1994–2001) | |
| Marc Coralluzzo | | | Raeford, North Carolina | NWA 2000 (1997–2001) | |
| Billy Corgan | 1967– | 2011– | | Resistance Pro Wrestling (2011–2014) Total Nonstop Action Wrestling(2015–2016) National Wrestling Alliance (2017–) | |
| Steve Corino | 1973– | 1994– | Limerick, Pennsylvania | 3K Wrestling Fighting Athletes (2008–2009) | |
| Jim Cornette | 1961– | 1982–2012 | Knoxville, Tennessee | Smokey Mountain Wrestling (1992–1995) | |
| Corporal Punishment (Dan McDevitt) | 1973– | 1998–2003; 2006– | Dundalk, Maryland | Maryland Championship Wrestling (1998–2003; 2006–) | |
| Bruiser Costa (Jeff Costa) | 1962– | 1994– | Hudson, New Hampshire | Ringside Wrestling (1994–1996); World Independent Wrestling (1997–1999) | |
| Count Grog (Greg Mosorjak) | 1961– | 1981– | Raleigh, North Carolina | Southern Championship Wrestling (1994–2004); G.O.U.G.E. (2006–) | |
| Jeff Cowey | | | Marietta, Georgia | Atlantic States Wrestling Federation (1992–1996) | |
| Lewis Crane | | | Greer, South Carolina | Southern Carolina Wrestling (1990–1999) | |
| Steve Creasy | | | Lexington, Tennessee | Tennessee Valley Wrestling Alliance (1998) | |
| Wayne Cryderman | 1968– | 1996– | Lima, Ohio | Global Wrestling Alliance (1996–1998); World Wide Wrestling Alliance (1999) | |
| Mark Cuccia | | 1999 | Lima, Ohio | Global Wrestling Alliance (1999) | |
| John Curse | | 1996– | Hicksville, New York | New York Wrestling Connection (2002–) | |
| Dan Curtis | 1961–1998 | 1989–1992; 1996–1998 | Warren, Michigan (MCW) | Motor City Wrestling (1989–1992); Championship Wrestling Federation (1996–1997); Northern States Wrestling Alliance (1997–1998); Hellfire Wrestling (1998) | |
| Tom Cusati | | | Tower City, Pennsylvania | Galaxy Wrestling Federation (1993) | |
| B.A. Dalton (Wes Wilson) | | | Mineral Wells, Texas | Texas Outlaw Promotions (1993–2003) | |
| Allison Danger (Cathy Corino) | 1977– | 2000– | Berwyn, Illinois | Shimmer Women Athletes (2005–) | |
| Scott D'Amore | 1974– | 1993– | Windsor, Ontario | Border City Wrestling (1993–Present) Total Nonstop Action Wrestling (2005–2024): Global Force Wrestling (2014–2017); Maple Leaf Pro Wrestling (2024–present) | |
| Daryl Davis | | | Jacksonville, Florida | Pan-American Championship Wrestling (1999–) | |
| Danny Davis (Daniel Briley) | 1952– | 1978– | Houston, Texas (AWU); Louisville, Kentucky (OVW) | Associated Wrestlers of the Universe (1992–1994); Ohio Valley Wrestling (1997–) | |
| Willie Paul Davis | | | Columbia, Tennessee | National Wrestling Federation (1998) | |
| Scott Decker | | 1993–1994 | Hamden, Connecticut | Renegade Wrestling Federation (1993–1994) | |
| Henry Dean | | 1997–1999 | Wilson, North Carolina | Global Championship Wrestling (1997–1999) | |
| Tommy Dee | | 1992–1997 | Staten Island, New York | Universal Superstars of America (1992–1997) | |
| Rick Deezel (Dean Puckett) | 1962– | 1992– | Mt. Airy, North Carolina | American Independent Wrestling Federation (1992); Allied Independent Wrestling Federation (1993–) | |
| Rocco Dellasandro | 1940– | 1993–2005 | Cranston, Rhode Island | New England Wrestling Alliance (1992–2005) | |
| Jimmy Deo (James Eschbach) | 1962- | 1987–2000 | Leesport, Pennsylvania | Independent Wrestling Alliance (1990) | |
| Blaine DeSantis | | 1995–2001 | Reading, Pennsylvania | Pennsylvania Championship Wrestling (1995–2001) | |
| Carmine DeSpirito | | 1993– | Milwaukee, Wisconsin (MAW); Brownsville, Texas (NWA-LA) | Mid-American Wrestling (1993–2007); NWA Lucha Americana (2009) | |
| Doc Diamond | | 1983– | Sewell, New Jersey | World Wrestling Stars Alliance (2004–2005); Devastation Wrestling Federation (2006–) | |
| Johnny Diamond | 1952–2012 | 1994–2012 | Cincinnati, Ohio | Northern Wrestling Federation (1994–1998); Dynamic Wrestling Alliance (2008); Classic Championship Wrestling (2009); World Renown Wrestling (2012) | |
| Don DiBiase (Don Henritzy) | | 1996–2008 | Chalmette, Louisiana | Ultimate Wrestling Federation (1996–2008) | |
| Dusty Dillinger | | | Lima, Ohio | Global Wrestling Alliance (2007–2008) | |
| Dave Dobashi | | | Tacoma, Washington | Universal Independent Wrestling (1992–1993); Universal Independent Wrestling Alliance (1995–1997); Cascade Championship Wrestling (1997–2001) | |
| Rodney Dobson | | | Marietta, Georgia | Atlantic States Wrestling Federation (1992–1996) | |
| Shane Dorr | 1990- | 2015- | Camden, South Carolina | Palmetto Championship Wrestling (2015-) | |
| Shane Douglas (Troy Martin) | 1964– | 1982– | Philadelphia, Pennsylvania | Hardcore Homecoming (2005); Extreme Rising (2012–2013); Classic Wrestling Revolution (2016–) | |
| Larry Doyle | | | Hollywood, California | Cal-International Pro Wrestling (1994–1998) | |
| Ric Drasin | 1944–2020 | 1965–2001 | Sherman Oaks, California | American Wrestling Federation (1997) | |
| Jeff Droke | | | Memphis, Tennessee | American Championship Wrestling (1999–2002) | |
| Mike Dugger | | | Greeneville, Tennessee | All Pro Wrestling (1994–1998) | |
| Jesse Ellis | | | Morristown, Tennessee | United Atlantic Championship Wrestling | |
| Terry England | | | Brownsville, Kentucky (UCW); Franklin, Kentucky (CWF) | Ultimate Championship Wrestling (1997–1998); Central Wrestling Federation (1998–1999) | |
| Vito Esparo | 1984– | 2011– | Fairfield, Connecticut (PGW) | Power & Glory Wrestling (2007–2011) | |
| Paul Eubanks | | | Bentonville, Arkansas | South East Championship Wrestling (1998–) | |
| Bob Evans | 1972– | 1991– | Pawtucket, Rhode Island; Hudson, New Hampshire | Power League Wrestling (1991–1993); World Independent Wrestling (1997–1999); Eastern Pro Wrestling (2005–2011) | |
| Johnny Evans | | | Jacksonville, Florida | Pan-American Championship Wrestling (1999–) | |
| Johnny Evans | | | Miami, Florida | National Wrestling Council (1993–2009) | |
| Excalibur (Marc Letzmann) | 1980- | 2000– | Los Angeles | Pro Wrestling Guerrilla (2003–) | |
| Eric Extreme | 1979- | 1999- | Worcester, Massachusetts | Wrestling Alliance of Mayhem (1999–2006) | |
| Johnny Fabulous (John Cena, Sr.) | 1944- | | Melrose, Massachusetts | Millennium Wrestling Federation (2007–) | |
| Tony Falk | 1961– | 1983– | Paducah, Kentucky (ASW); Nashville, Tennessee (USWO) | All Star Wrestling (1994–2004); United States Wrestling Organization (2002–) | |
| Randall Fanning | | | McMinnville, Tennessee | Hardcore Championship Wrestling (1996–1998); Southern Tennessee Wrestling (1998–1999) | |
| David K. Farmer | | | Fort Worth, Texas | Insane Hardcore Wrestling (1998–2003; 2008–) | |
| Dan Farren | | | Hollywood, California | Hollywood Heavyweight Wrestling (1990); Cal-International Pro Wrestling (1994–) | |
| Rob Feinstein | 1972- | 1995-2004 | Philadelphia | Ring Of Honor (2002-2004) | |
| Rick Fenwick | | | Philadelphia | Northern Wrestling Council (1994) | |
| Tommy Fierro | 1977– | 1993– | Philadelphia (NWC); Freehold Township, New Jersey (ISPW) | Northern Wrestling Council (1994); Independent Superstars of Pro Wrestling (1999–2010); 80's Wrestling Con | |
| Joseph Fillers | | | Flag Pond, Tennessee | Southern Championship Wrestling (1995–1998) | |
| Robert Fischer | | | Philadelphia | Pennsylvania Wrestling Alliance (1998–2000) | |
| Shawn Fitzgerald | | | Verona, Pennsylvania | Tri-State Wrestling Federation (1990–1992) | |
| Doug Flex (Doug Yasinsky) | 1964– | 1988–2004 | Harrisburg, Pennsylvania | International Pro Wrestling (1996–2004) | |
| John Forsythe | | | Tupelo, Mississippi | International Wrestling Federation (1998–) | |
| Jim Foxx | | | Monroe, North Carolina | All-Pro Championship Wrestling (1994–1996) | |
| Eric Freedom | | | Chicago | North American Wrestling Federation (1998–) | |
| Darrell Fugate | | | Somerset, Kentucky | Hardcore Championship Wrestling (1996–2010) | |
| Bobby Fulton (James Hines) | 1960– | 1977– | | Heritage Championship Wrestling (1990–1991); Big Time Wrestling (1992–) | |
| Dory Funk, Jr. | 1941– | 1963– | Ocala, Florida | International Wrestling Stars (1991); Funking Conservatory (1999–) | |
| Angel Gabriel | | | Fort Wayne, Indiana | Championship International Wrestling Alliance (1998–) | |
| Dale Gagner | 1996– | Present | Rochester, Minnesota | Wrestling Superstars Live (1996–2010) | |
| Rick Garcia | | | Corpus Christi, Texas | Gulf Coast Championship Wrestling / Gulf Coast Wrestling Alliance (1994–) | |
| Rick Garrett | | | Oklahoma City, Oklahoma | Mid-South Wrestling Federation (1996–2002) | |
| Mike Gasparza | | | Phoenix, Arizona | Southwestern Championship Wrestling (1998) | |
| Steve Gatorwolf (Steve Ketcher) | 1957-2017 | 1978–2006 | Phoenix, Arizona | American Wrestling Federation (1990–2000; 2006) | |
| Robert Geary | | | Philadelphia | Soul City Wrestling (1996–2000) | |
| Joel Gertner | 1975– | 1995– | Waterbury, Connecticut | MXW Pro Wrestling (2004–2010) | |
| Charles Gibbs | | | Vista, California | California Championship Wrestling (1997–2001) | |
| Silas Gibson | | | | Universal Championship Wrestling (1992–1993) | |
| Tommy Gibson | | | Ceredo, West Virginia | Championship Pro Wrestling (1998) | |
| Paulie Gilmore (James E. Allen) | | 1994– | Blackstone, Massachusetts | New World Wrestling (2003–2009); New World Wrestling Xtreme (2009–) | |
| Sheldon Goldberg | | | Jamaica Plain, Massachusetts | New England Championship Wrestling (2000–2010) | |
| Joel Goodhart | | 1990–1992 | Philadelphia | Tri-State Wrestling Alliance (1990–1992) | |
| Frank Goodman | | 1983– | Deer Park, New York; Orlando, Florida | USA Pro Wrestling (1994–2005); USA Xtreme Wrestling (2005–2008) | |
| Tod Gordon | 1955– | 1992– | Philadelphia | Extreme Championship Wrestling (1992–1996); Pro Wrestling Unplugged (2006–2008) | |
| Mitch Goude | | | Myrtle Beach, South Carolina | Atlantic Coast Championship Wrestling (1992); American Championship Wrestling (1993) | |
| Michael Gowing | | | Woodbury, Tennessee | New Age Wrestling Alliance (1999) | |
| Michael Grandizio | | | Swarthmore, Pennsylvania | All American Wrestling (1997–1998) | |
| Mickey Grant | | | Dallas, Texas | World Class II: The Next Generation (1997) | |
| Lolly Griffin | | | Monroe, Louisiana | Southern Championship Wrestling (1996–) | |
| Rodney Grimes | | | Corinth, Mississippi | Championship Wrestling Association (1998–) | |
| Tom Gyarmati | 1949– | | Price Hill, Ohio | Intense Wrestling Inc. (1998–) | |
| Bill Hagen | | | Asheville, North Carolina | Great American Wrestling Federation (1995–1997) | |
| Randy Hales | 1962– | 1998–2001 | Memphis, Tennessee | Power Pro Wrestling (1998–2001) | |
| Sal Hamaoui | | | Largo, Florida | Full Impact Pro (2004–); EVOLVE Wrestling (2010–) | |
| Larry Hamilton | | 1989– | Jacksonville, Florida | Pan-American Championship Wrestling (1999–) | |
| Sean Hansen | | | Lake Hiawatha, New Jersey | Women Superstars Uncensored (2007–) | |
| Al Hardiman | | 1992–2002 | Winter Haven, Florida | Florida Wrestling Federation (1992–2002) | |
| Van Harden | | | Memphis, Tennessee | Kick Ass Wrestling (1998–2000) | |
| Jeff Hardy | 1977– | 1997–1999 | Cameron, North Carolina | OMEGA (1997–1999) | |
| Matt Hardy | 1974– | 1997–1999 | Cameron, North Carolina | OMEGA (1997–1999) | |
| Jimmy Hart | 1944– | 1982– | Orlando, Florida | Xtreme Wrestling Federation (2001–2005); Wrestlicious (2010–2012) | |
| Gary Hathaway | | 1990– | Colchester, Vermont | New England Wrestling Federation (1990–2001) | |
| Jim Hawkins | | 1997– | Nutter Fort, West Virginia | Atlantic Coast Championship Wrestling (1997–1998); Mason-Dixon Wrestling (1998–1999) | |
| Dave Hebner | 1949–2022 | 1980–2022 | Richmond, Virginia | UWF Live (2005–2022) | |
| Earl Hebner | 1949– | 1980– | Richmond, Virginia | UWF Live (2005–) | |
| Michael Heimberger | | | Martinsburg, West Virginia | Championship Pro Wrestling (1997–2003) | |
| Robert Heimberger | | | Martinsburg, West Virginia | Championship Pro Wrestling (1997–2003) | |
| Paul Hellams | | 1983–2017 | Clinton, South Carolina | Southern Championship Wrestling (1995–2017) | |
| Ed Hellier | | | Lakeville, Minnesota | St. Paul Championship Wrestling (1998–); Steel Domain Wrestling (2001–) | |
| David Herro | 1972– | 1997– | Grafton, Wisconsin | Great Lakes Championship Wrestling (1997–) | |
| Paul Heyman | 1965– | 1987–2006 | Philadelphia | Extreme Championship Wrestling (1992–2001) | |
| Steve Hicks | | 1998 | Moulton, Alabama | World Organization of Wrestling (1998) | |
| Christopher Hill | | 2003–2008 | Buffalo, New York | Ballpark Brawl (2003–2008) | |
| Calvin Hodge | | | Pulaski, Virginia | Independent International Wrestling Association (1996–1997) | |
| Tim Horner | 1959– | 1978– | Johnson City, Tennessee | National Championship Wrestling (1994) | |
| John Horton | | 1992–1997 | Greenville, Mississippi | Pro Wrestling International (1992); Extreme Mid-South Wrestling (1993–1997) | |
| Tom Howard | 1969- | 1994-2006 | Clawson, Michigan | International Wrestling Organization (1998–2001) | |
| Henry Hubbard | | | St. Louis, Missouri | Missouri Wrestling Federation / Midwest Wrestling Federation / International Championship Wrestling (1992–1995) | |
| Dwayne Huckaba | | | Memphis, Tennessee | American Championship Wrestling (1999–2002) | |
| Kevin Hughes | | 1997–1999 | Hudson, New Hampshire | World Independent Wrestling (1997–1999) | |
| Robin Hunt | | | Elmira, New York | United States Wrestling Federation (1995–2000) | |
| D. J. Hyde | 1978– | 2003– | Philadelphia | Combat Zone Wrestling (2009–) | |
| Frank Iadevaia | 1972–2015 | 1992–2015 | Rahway, New Jersey | Northern States Wrestling Alliance (1995–1996); Jersey All Pro Wrestling (1997–2015) | |
| Austin Idol | 1949– | 1992–1993 | Dothan, Alabama | USA Wrestling (1992–1993) | |
| Mike Imburgia | 1972–2026 | | Fairfield, Ohio | Real Deal Pro Wrestling (1997–) | |
| David Jackson | | 1992 | Cranston, Rhode Island | New England Wrestling Alliance (1992–2005) | |
| Johnny Jackson | | | Winter Garden, Florida | Central Florida Wrestling (1994) | |
| Beau James | | 1989– | Kingsport, Tennessee | Southern States Wrestling (1991–) | |
| Dallas James (Don Parker) | | 1993–1998 | Indianapolis, Indiana | Midwestern Wrestling Alliance (1993–1994); Pro Wrestling International (1995–1998) | |
| Jamie Jamitowski | | | North Andover, Massachusetts | Chaotic Wrestling (2000–) | |
| Allen Jarnagan | | | Elizabethton, Tennessee | Northeast Championship Wrestling (1995); Appalachian Mountain Wrestling (1998–1999) | |
| Nick Jarman | 1981– | 1998–2000 | Jacksonville, Florida | Thunder Wrestling Federation (1998–2000) | |
| Jeff Jarrett | 1967– | 1986– | Memphis, Tennessee | Global Force Wrestling (2014-2017); Total Non-Stop Action (2002–) | |
| Wesley Jenkins | | | Cleveland, Mississippi | South's Greatest Wrestling Fans (1998–1999); NWA Mississippi (1999–) | |
| Jason Jerry | | 2005– | Green Bay, Wisconsin | NWA Wisconsin (2005–) | |
| Mark Johnson | | 1995 | Chicopee, Massachusetts | Massachusetts Wrestling Association (1995) | |
| Rocky Johnson | 1944–2020 | 1965–2003 | Tampa, Florida | Caribbean Championship Wrestling (1993–1994) | |
| Barry Jones | | | Mustang, Oklahoma | Maximum Championship Wrestling (1996–1997) | |
| Leslie Jones | | | Tupelo, Mississippi | International Wrestling Federation (1998–) | |
| Tom Jones | | | Oklahoma City, Oklahoma | Power Zone Wrestling Alliance (1994–1997); Mid-South Wrestling Federation (1998–2002) | |
| Stan Pain (Stanley Joseph) | 1974– | 1991–2008, 2011– | Chicago | Evolution Championship Pro Wrestling (2004); Real Good Wrestling (2007) | |
| Chuck Justice | | | Cherokee, North Carolina | Southeastern Wrestling Alliance (1989); South Eastern Wrestling Alliance (1991–1997) | |
| Ivan Kafoury | | 1997– | Portland, Oregon | Portland Wrestling (1997–) | |
| Jeff Kafoury | | 1997– | Portland, Oregon | Portland Wrestling (1997–) | |
| Johnny Kashmere | 1978– | 1999– | Philadelphia | Pro Wrestling Unplugged (2006–2010) | |
| Spanky Keane | | | Wilson, North Carolina | Global Championship Wrestling (1997–1999) | |
| Mike Kelly | | | Westland, Michigan | Great Lakes Wrestling (1996–2003) | |
| Jake Kemmerer | | 1990–2009 | Bethlehem, Pennsylvania | Eastern Wrestling Federation (1998–2001); Hardway Wrestling (2001–2006) | |
| Sam Kent | d. 2002 | | Forest Park, Georgia | North Georgia Wrestling Association (1992–1997) | |
| Jim Kettner | | 1967–2010 | Newark, Delaware | East Coast Wrestling Association (1967–2010) | |
| Gary Key | 1963– | | Simi Valley, California | Impact Wrestling Federation (1998–1999) | |
| Scott King | | 2000– | Portland, Maine | Eastern Wrestling Alliance (2000–) | |
| Kevin Kleinrock | | 1999– | Los Angeles | Wrestling Society X (2006–2007) | |
| Calvin Knapp | | | Terrell, Texas | Extreme Pro Wrestling (1998–1999) | |
| Roger Knapp | | | Hendersonville, North Carolina | National Wrestling Federation (1993–1997) | |
| Alex Knight (Alejandro Fregoso) | | 1962– | Los Angeles | American Independent Wrestling Alliance (1990–1998) | |
| Jason Knight (Ronald Jason Knight) | 1963– | 1977– | Waterbury, Connecticut | Assault Championship Wrestling (2001–2004) | |
| Kevin Knight (Kevin Sorbo) | 1973– | 1996– | Woodland Park, New Jersey | Independent Wrestling Federation (1998–) | |
| Rick Knopf | | | Jacksonville, Florida | Insane Wrestling Alliance (1996–) | |
| Michael Krause | | 1999– | Green Bay, Wisconsin | All-Star Championship Wrestling (1999–2001); Mercury1 Wrestling | - |
| Barry Kohloff | | 2016- | Hazel Green, Alabama | Rocket City Championship Wrestling (2016-) | - |
| Tom Labarge | | | Allentown, Pennsylvania | World Xtreme Wrestling (1999–) | |
| Brad Laber | | 1996– | Cincinnati, Ohio | Heartland Wrestling Association (1996–) | |
| Joe Lachance | | 1999– | Milford, Connecticut (CCW); Fairfield, Connecticut (PGW) | Connecticut Championship Wrestling (2000–2007); Power & Glory Wrestling (2007–2011) | |
| Ben Lagerstrom | | | Lake Hiawatha, New Jersey | Northeast Wrestling (1995–1998) | |
| Tom Lance | | | Mineola, Texas | Superstars of Wrestling (1998–2002) | |
| Terry Landell | 1950– | 1972– | Knoxville, Tennessee | Tennessee Mountain Wrestling (2001–) | |
| Verne Langdon | 1941–2011 | 1986–1998 | Studio City, California | Slammers Wrestling Federation (1986–1998) | |
| Jeff Lane | | 1999–2003 | Logan, West Virginia | World Professional Wrestling (1999–2003) | |
| Gary Langevin | | 1996–2003 | Newport, Vermont | Green Mountain Wrestling (1996–2003) | |
| Thomas LaPeer | | | Warren, Michigan | Championship Wrestling Federation (1996–1997) | |
| Chris Lash | | | Commodore, Pennsylvania | Allied Powers Wrestling Federation (1998–2003) | |
| Larry Latham | 1952–2003 | 1998–2003 | Osceola, Arkansas | Moondog Championship Wrestling (1998–2003) | |
| LaFonce Latham | | | Osceola, Arkansas | Moondog Championship Wrestling (1998–2009) | |
| Karl Lauer | 1938-2022 | | St. Louis, Missouri | World League Wrestling (1999–) | |
| Brian Latham | | | Deer Park, New York | Eastern States Wrestling / Eastern Shores Wrestling (1994–1998) | |
| Johnny Legend | 1948-2026 | | Hollywood, California (HHW); San Francisco, California (ISW) | Hollywood Heavyweight Wrestling (1990); Incredibly Strange Wrestling (1995–2000s) | |
| Rick Leribeus | 1957– | 1986– | Bay City, Texas | Texas Championship Wrestling (1996–2000) | |
| J.T. Lightning | 1970–2011 | 1993–2011 | Cleveland, Ohio | Cleveland All-Pro Wrestling (1993–1997) | |
| Mark Little | | | Sparta, Tennessee | American Wrestling Federation (1997–1998) | |
| Scott Little | | | Mt. Vernon, Illinois | Independent Championship Wrestling (1996–1998) | |
| Bobby Lombardi | | | Long Island, New York | Long Island Wrestling Federation (1997–2002) | |
| Josh Lomberger | | | Hammond, Indiana | Tri-Town Championship Wrestling (1998–) | |
| Rudy Lomberger | | | Hammond, Indiana | Tri-Town Championship Wrestling (1998–) | |
| Scott Lost (Scott Epperson) | 1980– | 2001– | Los Angeles | Pro Wrestling Guerrilla (2003–) | |
| Jose Lothario (Guadalupe Robledo) | 1934–2018 | 1956–1999 | San Antonio, Texas | Pro Wrestling International (1998); Texas Wrestling Alliance (1998–) | |
| Jonathan Luvstruck | | | Red Lion, Pennsylvania | National Championship Wrestling (1997–2009) | |
| Brian Lyle | | | LaSalle, Illinois | Powerhouse Championship Wrestling (1993–2000) | |
| Tim Lyle | | | LaSalle, Illinois | Powerhouse Championship Wrestling (1993–2000) | |
| Billy Mack | | | Tampa, Florida | International Championship Wrestling Association (1991–1994) | |
| Mad Man Pondo (Kevin Canady) | 1969– | 1989– | Dunbar, West Virginia | IWA East Coast (2004–) | |
| Pete Maguire | | | Tulsa, Oklahoma | Maximum Championship Wrestling (1996); Oklahoma Pro (1997–2000) | |
| Brian Mailhot | | 2001– | Portland, Maine | Eastern Wrestling Alliance (2000–) | |
| Major Massacre (Chris Brown) | | | Hamilton, Ohio | Wrestling Group International (1993–1998); Superstar Wrestling Federation (1998–2011) | |
| Jordan Schneider (Jordan Schneider) | | | Manhattan, New York | Family Wrestling Entertainment (2010–) | |
| Earl Mangrum | | | St. Louis, Missouri | Interstate Wrestling Alliance (1999) | |
| Neil Manolian | | | Melrose, Massachusetts | Millennium Wrestling Federation (2001–) | |
| Eddie Mansfield | | | Orlando, Florida | International Wrestling Federation (1991–1993) | |
| Johnny Mantell | | | Monroe, Louisiana | Southern Championship Wrestling (1996–) | |
| Jayson Maples (Jason Maples) | 1969– | 1990–2010 | Marion, Indiana | Extreme Wrestling Federation (1998–2012) | |
| Richard Marchand | | | Philadelphia | Soul City Wrestling (1996–2000) | |
| Martin Marin | | | Orange County, California | World Power Wrestling (1997–) | |
| Doc Marlee (Jason Levin) | | 1998–2000 | Pacoima, California | United Independent Wrestling Alliance (1998–2000) | |
| David Marquez | | | Springfield, Missouri; Los Angeles (NWA-P); Hollywood (NWA-CWH) | World League Wrestling (1997–1998); NWA Pro (2003–2010); NWA Championship Wrestling from Hollywood (2011–) | |
| Art Marshall | | | Warren, Michigan | Championship Wrestling Federation (1996–1997); Northern States Wrestling Alliance (1997–1998) | |
| Rick Martello | 1958–1997 | 1994–1996 | Clinton, Massachusetts | New England Pro Wrestling (1994–1996) | |
| David Martin | | | Millersville, Tennessee | International Wrestling Organization (1994) | |
| Jerry Martin | | | Ellerbe, North Carolina | Mainstream Wrestling Organization (1997–1998) | |
| Steve Martin | | | Cornelia, Georgia | National Championship Wrestling (1997–1999) | |
| T.C. Martin | | 1994-1998 | Las Vegas, Nevada | National Wrestling Council (1994–1995) | |
| Tony Martinelli | | | Marrero, Louisiana | Cajun Wrestling Federation (1997–2009) | |
| Ken Massey | | | Kosciusko, Mississippi | Mid-South Wrestling Federation (1991) | |
| Ben Masters | | | Cordele, Georgia | Peach State Wrestling (1991–1996) | |
| Joe Matterazzo | | | Providence, Rhode Island | Mayhem Independent Wrestling (1998–2000) | |
| John McAdam | | 1992 | Nashua, New Hampshire | Universal Championship Wrestling (1992) | |
| Daniel McClung | | | Falls View, West Virginia | 5-Star Wrestling (1998–1999) | |
| Andy McDaniel | | | Charleston, South Carolina | Low Country Wrestling (1998); American Classic Wrestling (1999) | |
| Ryan McGonagle | | | Pacoima, California | United Independent Wrestling Alliance (1999) | |
| J.D. McKay | | | Louisville, Mississippi | Ringside Riot Promotions (1991) | |
| Scott McKeever | | | Ronceverte, West Virginia | West Virginia Wrestling (1992–1994) | |
| Danny McLain | | | Cleveland, Mississippi | South's Greatest Wrestling Fans (1998–1999); NWA Mississippi (1999–) | |
| Bob Meister | | 1995–1997 | Dallas, Texas | Confederate Wrestling Association (1995–1996); Continental Wrestling Alliance (1996–1997) | |
| Bill Mercer | 1926–2025 | 1953–1959; 1976–1997 | Dallas, Texas | World Class II: The Next Generation (1997) | |
| Cody Michaels (Mark Keenan) | | 1986– | Los Angeles | Wrestling Society X (2006–2007) | |
| Shawn Michaels (Shawn Hickenbottom) | 1965– | 1984–2010; 2021– | San Antonio, Texas; Orlando, Florida | Texas Wrestling Alliance (1998–2001); NXT (WWE) (2021–) | |
| Dave Milan | | | Philadelphia | Women's Extreme Wrestling (2002–) | |
| Gene Miller | | 1997–2002 | Monroe, Michigan (SMCW); Charlotte, Michigan (NWA-M); Sterling Heights, Michigan (NWA-GL) | Southern Michigan Championship Wrestling (1997–1998); NWA Michigan (1998–2000); NWA Great Lakes (2000–2002) | |
| Grant Miller | | | Los Angeles | Great American Mat Endeavors (1995–1996) | |
| Jim Miller | | 1994– | McKeesport, Pennsylvania | NWA East / Pro Wrestling eXpress (1994–) | |
| David Millican | | | Brighton, Tennessee | American Wrestling Alliance (1995–1996) | |
| Alvin Minnick | | | Tiptonville, Tennessee | Warriors of Wrestling (1997–1998); NWA Mid-South (1999–2001) | |
| Dan Mirade | 1979-2022 | 2001–2022 | Melrose, Massachusetts | Millennium Wrestling Federation (2001–2022) | |
| Pete Miragliotta | | | Ohio | Midwest Championship Wrestling Alliance (1994–1997) | |
| Jeff Molande | | | Sparta, Tennessee | American Wrestling Federation (1997–1998) | |
| Malcolm Monroe, Sr. | 1951–2004 | 1980–2004 | Warren, Michigan | Midwest Championship Wrestling (1995); Insane Championship Wrestling (1996–2000); Xtreme Intense Championship Wrestling (2000–2004) | |
| Malcolm Monroe, Jr. | | 1996– | Warren, Michigan | Xtreme Intense Championship Wrestling (2004–) | |
| George Morales | | | Indianapolis, Indiana | Unified Wrestling Federation (1994–1998) | |
| Rip Morrison | | 1997–1999 | Hudson, New Hampshire | World Independent Wrestling (1997–1999) | |
| Mark Morton | | 1993–1998 | Hannibal, Missouri | Central States Wrestling Alliance (1993–1998) | |
| Don Muraco | 1949– | 1970–2005 | Honolulu, Hawaii | Hawai'i Championship Wrestling (2003–2008) | |
| Bob Murphy | | | Humble, Texas | Texas All-Star Wrestling (1994–) | |
| Steve Murphy | | | St. Louis, Missouri | Mississippi Valley Wrestling Association (1997–1998) | |
| Jerome Muse | | | Maryville, Tennessee | All-State Wrestling (1993–1996) | |
| Donny Myers | | | Northern Vermont and Southern Quebec | Eastern Township Wrestling Association (1992–) | |
| Jason Nash | | 1999–2001 | Lufkin, Texas | Texas Wrestling Association (1999–2001) | |
| Jim Neidhart | 1955–2018 | 1979–2016 | Tampa, Florida | Anvil Promotions (1993–1994) | |
| Steve Neilson | | | Salt Lake City, Utah | Ultra Championship Wrestling-Zero (2003–) | |
| Ron Niemi | 1970– | 1991– | Davie, Florida | Independent Professional Wrestling (1998–2003) | |
| Bob Nettles | | | Hague, Virginia | Southern Wrestling Association (1991–1994) | |
| Kurt Nile | | | Warren, Michigan (MCW) | Motor City Wrestling (1989–1991) | |
| Greg Oakes | | | Marietta, Georgia | Atlantic States Wrestling Federation (1992–1996) | |
| Bo Oates | 1970– | 1993–1997 | Columbus, Georgia | Georgia Wrestling Alliance (1996–1999) | |
| Ted Oates (Ted Allen) | 1955–2010 | 1970–2010 | Columbus, Georgia | Georgia Wrestling Alliance (1996–1999) | |
| Carlina O'Brien | | 1995–2000 | Barnegat Township, New Jersey (WWC); Ocean City, Maryland (APWA); Staten Island, New York (RCW/NWA-NY) | World Wrestling Coalition (1995–1996); Action Packed Wrestling Alliance (1996–1998); Richmond Championship Wrestling (1998); NWA New York (1998–2000) | |
| Mike O'Brien | | | Newburgh, New York | Northeast Wrestling (1994–1998); NWA Northeast (1998–2000); Northeast Wrestling (2000–) | |
| Richard O'Brien | | 1995–2000 | Barnegat Township, New Jersey (WWC); Ocean City, Maryland (APWA); Staten Island, New York (RCW/NWA-NY) | World Wrestling Coalition (1995–1996); Action Packed Wrestling Alliance (1996–1998); Richmond Championship Wrestling (1998); NWA New York (1998–2000) | |
| Steve O'Neill | | | Philadelphia, Pennsylvania | Extreme Rising (2013–2015) | |
| Ben Oliver | | 1998–2007 | St. Louis, Missouri | Midwest Renegade Wrestling (1998–1999); Gateway Championship Wrestling (2000–2007) | |
| Satoshi Oji | | | Philadelphia | Dragon Gate USA (2009–) | |
| Paul Olsek, Sr. | | | Bethlehem, Pennsylvania | Eastern Wrestling Federation (1998–2001); Hardway Wrestling (2001–2006) | |
| Paul Olsek, Jr. | | 1990–2009 | Bethlehem, Pennsylvania | Eastern Wrestling Federation (1998–2001); Hardway Wrestling (2001–2006) | |
| Bob Orton, Jr. | 1950– | 1972– | Knoxville, Tennessee | Tennessee Mountain Wrestling (2001–) | |
| Jeff Osborne | | 1992–1995 | Evansville, Indiana | New American Wrestling (1993–1995) | |
| Michael Paolini | | 1998–2007 | Milford, Connecticut | Connecticut Championship Wrestling (1998–2007) | |
| Jeff Patton | | 1993–1995 | Morganton, North Carolina | Burke County Wrestling (1993–1994); New World Wrestling (1994–1995) | |
| Mark Pennington | | 2004– | Coldwater, Michigan | Price of Glory Wrestling (2004–) | |
| Jose Perez | 1972– | 2011– | Taunton, Massachusetts | Full Spectrum Wrestling (2011–) | |
| Joe Perri | | | Verona, Pennsylvania | Tri-State Wrestling Federation (1990–1992) | |
| Mike Pescina | | 1998–2003 | Davie, Florida | Independent Professional Wrestling (1998–2003) | |
| Bud Petty | | | McMinnville, Tennessee | Hardcore Championship Wrestling (1996–1998) | |
| Christopher Plano | | | Greensboro, North Carolina | New Dimension Wrestling (1997–2005) | |
| Steve Podunavac | | 1990–2005 | Logan, West Virginia | American International Wrestling (1989); World Professional Wrestling (1990–2005) | |
| Dan Polinsky | | | Pittsburgh, Pennsylvania | Far North Wrestling (2003–2011) | |
| Kris Pope | | 1992–1994 | San Bernardino, California | Coast to Coast Wrestling Federation / Golden State Wrestling (1992–1994) | |
| Ron Post | 1974– | 1996– | Jersey Shore, New Jersey | Empire Wrestling Association (1996); Empire Wrestling Alliance (1997–) | |
| Brian Powell | | | High Point, North Carolina | Atlantic Championship Wrestling / Alternative Championship Wrestling (1994–2004) | |
| William Powell | | | Richfield, Wisconsin | Badger State Pro Wrestling (1996–2003) | |
| Scott Pratt | | 1998–1999 | Marion, North Carolina | Southern Wrestling Alliance (1998–1999) | |
| Dave Prazak | | 1996– | Berwyn, Illinois | Shimmer Women Athletes (2005–) | |
| Bert Prentice | 1958-2021 | 1984–2021 | Sioux Falls, South Dakota (MSCW); Dallas, Texas (CWT); Memphis, Tennessee (MCW/NWA-WW) | Championship Wrestling from Texas (1992); Music City Wrestling (1997–1998); NWA Worldwide (1998–2002) | |
| Greg Price | | | Charlotte, North Carolina | Carolina Championship Wrestling (1991); South Atlantic Pro Wrestling (1991–1992); All-Star Wrestling (1993–1998); NWA All-Star Wrestling (1998–1999); NWA Carolinas (1999); NWA: New Beginnings (2010) | |
| Jim Princeton | | | Tiptonville, Tennessee | Warriors of Wrestling (1997–1999); NWA Mid-South (1999–2001) | |
| Mike Quackenbush (Michael Spillane) | 1976– | 1994–2020 | Philadelphia | CHIKARA (2002–2020) | |
| Harley Race | 1943–2019 | 1960–2019 | Eldon, Missouri | World League Wrestling (1999–) | |
| Dave Rahman | | 1998 | Houston, Texas | Great South Wrestling Federation (1998) | |
| Pharnell Raines | | | Kingsport, Tennessee | Iron Ring Wrestling (1998–2011) | |
| John Rambo | 1962– | 1989– | Hagerstown, Maryland | House of Pain Wrestling Federation (1997–) | |
| Steve Rand | | 2000–2003 | Portland, Maine | Eastern Wrestling Alliance (2000–2003) | |
| T. Rantula (David Younkins) | 1962– | 1990– | Pittsburgh, Pennsylvania | Far North Wrestling (2003–2011) | |
| Michael Rapuano | 1974– | 1990–2003; 2011– | Miami, Florida (AWC); Davie, Florida (FOW) | Atlantic Wrestling Council (1990–1994); Future of Wrestling (1998–2003; 2011–) | |
| Vincent Ratte | 1976– | 1998–2000 | | Unified Championship Wrestling (1998–2000) | |
| Lou Reardon (Louis Reardon) | | 1994 | Deer Park, New York | Eastern States Wrestling / Eastern Shores Wrestling (1994) | |
| Reckless Youth (Tom Carter) | 1974- | 1995– | Philadelphia | CHIKARA (2002–) | |
| Frank Reed (Frank Root) | | 1987– | Hannibal, Missouri (CSWA); Litchfield, Illinois (RCW) | Gateway City Championship Wrestling / Heartland Championship Wrestling (1991–1994); Missouri State Wrestling Alliance (1992); Central States Wrestling Alliance (1993–1998); Rampage Championship Wrestling (1999–2009) | |
| Frank Reyes | | | Tampa, Florida | Southeastern Professional Wrestling Federation (1996–1998) | |
| Cody Rhodes (Cody Runnels) | 1985– | 2018–2022 | Jacksonville, Florida | All Elite Wrestling (AEW) (2019–present); Ring of Honor (2022–present) | |
| Tony Khan | 1982– | 2018–present | Jacksonville, Florida | All Elite Wrestling (AEW) (2019–present); Ring of Honor (2022–present) | |
| J.R. Rhodes | | | Jacksonville, Florida | Insane Wrestling Alliance (1996–) | |
| Steve Ricard | 1979– | 2000– | New Bedford, Massachusetts | Top Rope Promotions (2000–) | |
| Randy Ricci | 1966– | 1998– | Lake Barrington, Illinois | North American Wrestling Federation (1998–) | |
| Davey Richards (Wesley Richards) | 1983– | 2004– | Rahway, New Jersey | EVOLVE Wrestling (2010–) | |
| Reno Riggins (Neal Hargrove) | 1967– | 1986– | Madison, Tennessee | Spectrum Sports (1993) | |
| Ron Rivera | | | City of Industry, California | Revolution Pro Wrestling (1999–2004) | |
| Chuck Roberts | | | Pittsburgh, Pennsylvania | International Wrestling Cartel (2001–) | |
| Rusty Roberts | | | Morristown, Tennessee | United Atlantic Championship Wrestling (1994–1998) | |
| Chaz Rocco | 1968–2005 | 1993–1999 | Myrtle Beach, South Carolina | American Championship Wrestling (1993–1999) | |
| Gino Rocco (Gene Wapiennik) | 1968– | 1984– | Washington, Pennsylvania | All-Star Wrestling Association (1991–1993) | |
| Bobby Rogers | 1974– | 1998–2003; 2011– | Fort Lauderdale, Florida | Future of Wrestling (1998–2003; 2011–) | |
| Mike Rogers | | | St. Louis, Missouri (MRW); Cape Girardeau, Missouri (ICW) | Midwest Renegade Wrestling (1998–2000); Impact Championship Wrestling (2000) | |
| Chris Rose | | | Memphis, Tennessee | American Championship Wrestling (1999–2002) | |
| Ian Rotten (John Williams) | 1970– | 1996– | Louisville, Kentucky | IWA Mid-South (1996–) | |
| Roger Ruffen | | 1998– | Cincinnati, Ohio | Northern Wrestling Federation (1998–) | |
| Anthony Rufo | 1968– | 1998– | Taunton, Massachusetts (FSW) | Unified Championship Wrestling (1998–2000); Ultimate Championship Wrestling (2003–2005); Full Spectrum Wrestling (2011–) | |
| Hugh Rundles | | | Tiptonville, Tennessee | Warriors of Wrestling (1997–1999); NWA Mid-South (1999–2000) | |
| Andy Runyon | | | Portsmouth, Ohio | Wrestling Group International (1993–1998); Superstar Wrestling Federation (1998–2001) | |
| Rob Russen | | 1976– | Philadelphia (NAWF/NWF); Girard, Ohio (IWA) | North American Wrestling Federation (1979–1984); National Wrestling Federation (1985–1988); International Wrestling Association (1989–1995) | |
| Joey Ryan (Joey Meehan) | 1979– | 2000– | Los Angeles | Pro Wrestling Guerrilla (2003–) | |
| Kandy Ryan | | | Lenoir, North Carolina | Fantasy Pro-Wrestling Federation (1992–1994) | |
| Bob Ryder | 1956-2020 | 1990s-2020 | Nashville, Tennessee | Impact Wrestling (2002–2020) | |
| Gary Sabaugh | 1957- | | Charlotte, North Carolina (PWF) | Professional Wrestling Federation (1990–1999) | |
| Hermie Sadler | 1969– | 2005–2007 | Richmond, Virginia | UWF Live (2005–2007) | |
| Fred Salem | | | Huntington, West Virginia | All Star Championship Wrestling (1996–1999) | |
| Mike Samples | 1964- | | Central City, Kentucky (TSW); Indianapolis, Indiana (CCW); Evansville, Indiana (HWF) | Tri-State Wrestling (1991–1993); Circle City Wrestling (1996–1997); Hardcore Wrestling Federation (1997–1999) | |
| Chris Sanders | | | Cranston, Rhode Island | Rhode Island Wrestling Alliance (1995–2004) | |
| Tito Santana (Merced Solis) | 1953– | 1977– | Chicago | American Wrestling Federation (1995–1996) | |
| Clarence Santini | | | Woodbury, Tennessee | Universal Wrestling Alliance (1998); New Age Wrestling Alliance (1999) | |
| Gabe Sapolsky | 1972– | 1995– | Philadelphia | Dragon Gate USA (2009–); EVOLVE Wrestling (2010–) | |
| Bruno Sassi | 1970– | 1988– | Coral Springs | Coastal Championship Wrestling (2004–) | |
| Peter Savage | | | Stockton, California | Golden State Wrestling Alliance (1998–1999) | |
| Savannah Slim (Chris Livingstone) | | | Columbus, Ohio | National Wrestling Conference (1993–1998) | |
| Jordan Schneider | | | Manhattan, New York | Family Wrestling Entertainment (2010–) | |
| Kurt Schneider | 1951– | 1989–2009 | Warren, Michigan | Motor City Wrestling (1989–2000) | |
| Leo Schneider | | 1993 | Hannibal, Missouri | Central States Wrestling Alliance (1993) | |
| Mark Shrader | 1967– | 1993–2003 | Dundalk, Maryland | Maryland Championship Wrestling (1998–2003) | |
| Gordon Scozzari | 1970–2011 | 1991–2000 | Asbury Park, New Jersey | American Wrestling Federation (1991–1992) | |
| Bobby Sechrist | | | Mount Airy, North Carolina | Virginia Carolina Wrestling (1998) | |
| Shaggy 2 Dope (Joseph William Utsler) | 1974– | 1999– | Detroit, Michigan | Juggalo Championship Wrestling (1999–) | |
| Joshua Shea | | 2000–2001 | Portland, Maine | Eastern Wrestling Alliance (2000–2001) | |
| John Short | | | Egg Harbor City, New Jersey | Force One Pro Wrestling (2006–) | |
| Bernie Siegel (Bernard Siegel) | | 1991– | Cutler Ridge, Florida | Sunshine Wrestling Federation (1991–1998); Florida Championship Wrestling (1994–2001) | |
| Cary Silkin | | | Bristol, Pennsylvania | Ring of Honor (2002–2022) | |
| Thomas Simpson | | 1988– | Cameron, North Carolina | OMEGA (1997–1999) | |
| Sir Mo (Robert Horne) | 1967–2025 | 1991–2020 | Dyersburg, Tennessee; Dallas, Texas | New Blood Wrestling (2006–2009); SOAR Championship Wrestling (2016–present) | |
| Larry Skipper | | | Forest City, North Carolina | Eastern Wrestling Federation (1997–2003) | |
| Bill Slaydon | | | Hammond, Indiana | Nu Wave Wrestling Association (1996–1999) | |
| Richard Small | | 1995 | Portland, Oregon | Pacific Coast Wrestling (1995) | |
| Brian Smith | | | Elizabethton, Tennessee | Appalachian Mountain Wrestling (1998–1999) | |
| Robert Smith | | | London, Kentucky | Diehard Championship Wrestling (1997–2000) | |
| Tyson Smith | | | Ceredo, West Virginia | Championship Pro Wrestling (1998) | |
| Al Snow (Allen Sarven) | 1963– | 1993–1998 | Lima, Ohio | Global Wrestling Alliance (1993–1999); Ohio Valley Wrestling (2018-) | |
| George South | 1962– | 1985– | Charlotte, North Carolina (PWF); Concord, North Carolina (EWA) | Professional Wrestling Federation (1990–1999); Exodus Wrestling Alliance (2001–) | |
| Fred Sparta | | | Rockland, Massachusetts | World Wrestling Stars (1996–) | |
| Mike Sparta | | | Rockland, Massachusetts | World Wrestling Stars (1996–) | |
| Don Sparton | | | Hammond, Indiana | Ringside Wrestling Alliance (1994–1999) | |
| A.J. Sparxx (Michael Illions) | 1966– | | Woodland Park, New Jersey (IWF) | New Jack City Wrestling (1995–1996); American Wrestling Council (1997–1998); Independent Wrestling Federation (1998–) | |
| James St. Jean | | 1997–2000 | Lewiston, Maine | Eastern Wrestling Alliance (1997–2000) | |
| David St. Onge | 1964– | | Warren, Michigan (CWF); Hazel Park, Michigan (MWA) | Championship Wrestling Federation (1996–1997); Michigan Wrestling Alliance (1997–2004) | |
| Bob Staples | | 1997–1999 | Lewiston, Maine | Eastern Wrestling Alliance (1997–1999) | |
| Preston Steele (Pete Lucic) | | 1983– | Girard, Ohio | International Wrestling Association (1995–) | |
| Ken Staubs | | | Martinsburg, West Virginia | Ultimate Championship Wrestling (1995–1997) | |
| Cory Stevens | | | Limerick, Pennsylvania | 3K Wrestling Fighting Athletes (2008–2009) | |
| Gary Stevens | | | Edison, New Jersey | Bloody Rage American Wrestling League (1998–2003) | |
| Paul Stevens | | 1998–2000 | Tucson, Arizona | Combat Championship Wrestling (1998); Dragon's Den (1998–2000) | |
| Jonnie Stewart | 1967– | 1986–2007 | Racine, Wisconsin | Wrestling Superstars Live (1996–2010) | |
| Bill Stone | | 1999 | Bay St. Louis, Mississippi | Heroes of Wrestling (1999) | |
| Curtis Stone | | | San Antonio, Texas | Warriors 4 Christ Wrestling (1999–) | |
| Matt Storm (Matt West) | | 1998– | Providence, Rhode Island | Mayhem Independent Wrestling (1998–2000); PWF Northeast (2002–2006; 2010–) | |
| Kyle Storm (Kyle White) | 1974– | 1998– | Providence, Rhode Island | Mayhem Independent Wrestling (1998–2000); PWF Northeast (2002–2006; 2010–) | |
| Larry Strickland | | 1994–1998 | Gauley Bridge, West Virginia | Globe Star Pro Wrestling (1994–1998) | |
| Sage Strong (Travis Shirk) | | 2005– | Harrisburg, Pennsylvania | The Ultimate Wrestling Experience (2011–) | |
| Gary Sturdevant | | | Dallas, Texas | Big D Wrestling (1992–1994) | |
| Super Dragon (Daniel Lyon) | 1975– | 1997– | Los Angeles | Pro Wrestling Guerrilla (2003–) | |
| Frank Szabo | | | Butler, Pennsylvania | United States Wrestling League (1993–1998) | |
| Jeff Tankersley | 1968– | | Kingsport, Tennessee | Iron Ring Wrestling (1998–2011) | |
| Mike Tartaglia | | | Sewell, New Jersey | Tri-State Wrestling Alliance (1998–) | |
| Sean Tasco | | | Tampa, Florida | New Breed Pro Wrestling (1998–2004) | |
| Ken Taylor | | | Dallas, Texas | NWA Southwest / Southwest Wrestling Alliance (1998–2011) | |
| Trent Taylor (Scott Harvey) | | 1999–2001 | Pacoima, California | United Independent Wrestling Alliance (1999–2001) | |
| Les Thatcher | 1940– | 1996– | Cincinnati, Ohio | Heartland Wrestling Association (1996–) | |
| Dave Thomas | | | Jobstown, New Jersey | United Wrestling Coalition (1998–) | |
| Lois Thomas | | | Jobstown, New Jersey | United Wrestling Coalition (1998–) | |
| Gene Thompson | | | Maryville, Tennessee | Southern Wrestling Association (1992–1998) | |
| Mike Thompson | | | Richfield, Wisconsin | Badger State Pro Wrestling (1996–2003) | |
| John ThunderCloud (John Medlin) | 1979– | 1996– | Henderson, North Carolina | Atlantic States Championship Wrestling (1998); Central Carolina Pro Wrestling (1998–2000) | |
| Frank Thurman | | | Collinsville, Illinois | New Midwest Wrestling (1997) | |
| James Thurston | | | Morehead City, North Carolina | World Wrestling Organization (1998–2001) | |
| Chris Tibbs | | | Winchester, Virginia | Mid-Eastern Championship Wrestling (1995–1997) | |
| Ray Torres | | 1992– | Reading, Pennsylvania | Wild Independent Wrestling Federation (1995–1996); Regional Championship Wrestling (1996–) | |
| Barron Vangor Toth | 1973–2008 | 1998–1999 | Milford, Connecticut | Connecticut Championship Wrestling (1998–1999) | |
| Dave Touchstone | | | Stockton, California | Golden State Wrestling Alliance (1998–2000); Pacific Championship Wrestling (2000) | |
| Brian Tramel | | | Louisville, Mississippi | Ringside Riot Promotions (1991) | |
| Alfredo Travieso, Jr. | 1965– | 1995– | Cranston, Rhode Island | Rhode Island Wrestling Alliance (1995–2004) | |
| Triple H (Paul Levesque) | 1969– | 2012– | Stamford, Connecticut | WWE (2022–): Raw (2022–); SmackDown (2022–); NXT (2012–) | |
| Emily Tzortzatos | 1970– | 1995–1999 | New York City, New York | Ultimate Championship Wrestling (1995–1999) | |
| Dan Ulrich | | | Tampa, Florida | International Championship Wrestling Association (1991–1994) | |
| Steve Unterman | | | Baltimore, Maryland | Wrestling Independent Network (1992) | |
| Tony Valadez | | | San Bernardino, California | Sudden Impact Wrestling (1998) | |
| David Valentin | | | Reading, Pennsylvania | Wild Independent Wrestling Federation (1995–1996) | |
| Donny Valentine | | 1996–1997 | Baytown, Texas | Iron Fist Wrestling Federation (1996–1997) | |
| Rocco Valentino (Rob Biggins) | 1964– | 1996– | Tulsa, Oklahoma | Oklahoma Pro (1997–2000) | |
| Kenny Valiant | | | Tupelo, Mississippi | All Pro Wrestling (1990–) | |
| Mark Vance | | | Evansville, Indiana | Hardcore Wrestling Federation (1997–1999) | |
| Vampiro (Ian Richard Hodgkinson) | 1967– | 1991– | Los Angeles | Wrestling Society X (2006–2007) | |
| Jay Vargas (Jonathan Vargas) | 1989– | 2009–2010 | Tampa, Florida | Wrestlicious (2009–2010) | |
| Violent J (Joseph Bruce) | 1972– | 1999– | Detroit, Michigan | Juggalo Championship Wrestling (1999–) | |
| Dale Walker | | | Dyersburg, Tennessee | Dyersburg Championship Wrestling (1998–2010); Mid-America Championship Wrestling | |
| John Walter (Johnny Toonz) | 1979- | 2017- | Wysox, Pennsylvania | Northern Tier Wrestling (2017) | |
| Doug Ward | | | Stanton, Virginia | Mid-Atlantic Wrestling Alliance (1993–1995) | |
| Doug Watkins | | 1992– | Dalton, Georgia | Tri-Star Wrestling Alliance (1992–) | |
| Wendell Weatherby | 1960– | 1992–1993 | Billerica, Massachusetts | All-Star Can-Am Wrestling (1992–1993) | |
| Bill Weaver | 1964– | 1997–2008 | Melbourne, Florida | Coastal Championship Wrestling (1997–2008) | |
| Tim Welch | | | Morristown, Tennessee | United Atlantic Championship Wrestling (1995–1998) | |
| Danny Wenkel | | 1986– | Burlington, North Carolina | CWF Mid-Atlantic (2000–) | |
| Ray Whebbe, Jr. | 1955–2003 | | Lakeville, Minnesota | St. Paul Championship Wrestling (1998–1999) | |
| Flexx Wheeler | | 1992– | Philadelphia | Pennsylvania Wrestling Alliance (1998–2000) | |
| Joe Wheeler | | | Wilmington, North Carolina | Atlantic Coast Championship Wrestling (1997–2002) | |
| Dennis Wipprecht | | 1991– | Baltimore, Maryland | Mid-Eastern Wrestling Federation (1991–2004); Maryland Championship Wrestling (2006–) | |
| Billy Whack (Larry Statkus) | | | Chicago | Lunatic Wrestling Federation (1993–2004) | |
| Mikey Whipwreck (John Watson) | 1973– | 1994– | Hicksville, New York | New York Wrestling Connection (2002–) | |
| Anthony White | | | High Point, North Carolina | Atlantic Championship Wrestling / Alternative Championship Wrestling (1994–2004) | |
| Rod Whitworth | | | Commerce, Texas | National Class Wrestling (1993) | |
| John Wickizer | | | Philadelphia | Pennsylvania Wrestling Alliance (1998–2000) | |
| Scott Wilcox | | | Clinton, Tennessee | Volunteer Championship Wrestling (1997–1998) | |
| Maverick Wild (Scott C. Despres) | 1970– | 1988–2010 | Rochester, New Hampshire | Front Row Wrestling (2003–2010) | |
| Brant Wilkens | | | St. Louis, Missouri | Midwest Renegade Wrestling (1998–1999) | |
| Maurice Williams | | | Jacksonville, Florida | Thunder Wrestling Federation (1998–) | |
| Jack Williamson | | | Woodbury, New Jersey | Middle Atlantic States Wrestling (1992) | |
| Fred Willis | | | New Albany, Indiana | Wild Wrestling Action (1992) | |
| Carl Wilson | | | Wilmington, North Carolina | Coastal Carolina Wrestling Alliance / Carolina Wrestling Federation (1991–1994) | |
| Allen Withrow | 1974– | | Jonesboro, Arkansas | Continental Wrestling Federation (1996–2002) | |
| Roger Withrow | | | Jonesboro, Arkansas | Continental Wrestling Federation (1996–2002) | |
| Danny Wolfe | | | Hollywood, California | Hollywood Heavyweight Wrestling (1990) | |
| Mark Wood | | | Princeton, West Virginia | All Star Wrestling (1992–1993); Appalachian Championship Wrestling (1993) | |
| Tim Woody | | | High Point, North Carolina | Alternative Championship Wrestling (1994–2004) | |
| W.D. Woody | | 1995–2005 | Louisa, Virginia | Ultimate Championship Wrestling (1995–2005) | |
| Gary Woronchak | | 1994–1995 | Dearborn, Michigan | Midwest Territorial Wrestling (1994–1995) | |
| Bruce Wren | 1957– | | Orlando, Florida | Southeastern Championship Wrestling (1991–2002) | |
| Darren Wyse (Darren Wise) | 1975– | 1992–2009 | Red Lion, Pennsylvania | National Championship Wrestling (1997–2009) | |
| John Zandig (John Corson) | 1971– | 1996– | Philadelphia | Combat Zone Wrestling (1999–2009) | |
| Scott Zeinstra | 1969– | 1997–2003; 2007– | Grand Rapids, Michigan | Championship Wrestling of Michigan / Pro Wrestling Worldwide (1997–2003; 2007–) | |
| Rob Zicari | 1974– | 1999–2003 | Sherman Oaks, California | Xtreme Pro Wrestling (1999–2003) | |

== See also ==
- List of professional wrestling rosters
- Professional wrestling authority figures

== Footnotes ==
- ^{a} – Entries without a birth name indicates that the individual did not perform under a ring name.
- ^{b} – This includes the individual's entire time in the wrestling industry as opposed to activities as a promoter.
- ^{c} – Prior to the formation of the National Wrestling Alliance (NWA) in 1948, many promoters did not publicly operate under a formal company. Instead, wrestling was independently promoted out of major cities and were only loosely affiliated under the National Wrestling Association.
- ^{d} – This section lists the promotions in which the individual was the owner rather than being employed in a subordinate role such as booker or road agent.
