= MDW Heavyweight Championship =

Professional wrestling championship

Details
- Promotion: Mason-Dixon Wrestling
- Date established: August 23, 1997
- Current champion(s): Vacant
- Date won: September 3, 2003
Statistics
- First champion(s): Buddy Rose
- Most reigns: Mason Hunter (2); Brian Logan (2)
- Longest reign: Jamie Harris (411 days)
- Shortest reign: Brian Logan (1 day)

The MDW Heavyweight Championship is a professional wrestling heavyweight championship in Mason-Dixon Wrestling (MDW). It was the original heavyweight title of the Atlantic Coast Championship Wrestling promotion during its first year of operation. In December 1998, the promotion became Mason-Dixon Wrestling and the title became the MDW Heavyweight Championship.

The inaugural champion was "Freebird" Buddy Rose, who defeated Dark Overlord in Clarksburg, West Virginia on August 23, 1997 to become the first ACCW Heavyweight Champion. Brian Logan and Mason Hunter are tied for the record of most reigns, with two each. At 411 days, Jamie Harris' first and only reign is the longest in the title's history. Brian Logan's second and final reign was the shortest in the history of the title lasting only 1 day. Overall, there have been 11 reigns shared between 9 wrestlers, with four vacancies.

== Title history ==
Key

| # | Order in reign history |
| Reign | The reign number for the specific set of wrestlers listed |
| Event | The event in which the title was won |
| — | Used for vacated reigns so as not to count it as an official reign |
| N/A | The information is not available or is unknown |
| + | Indicates the current reign is changing daily |

=== Names ===
| Name | Years |
|---|---|
| ACCW Heavyweight Championship | 1997 — 1998 |
| MDW Heavyweight Championship | 1998 — 2002 |

=== Reigns ===
| # | Wrestlers | Reign | Date | Days held | Location | Event | Notes | Ref. |
|---|---|---|---|---|---|---|---|---|
| 1 | Buddy Rose | 1 | August 23, 1997 | 21 | Clarksburg, West Virginia | Live event | Rose defeated Dark Overlord to become the first MDW Heavyweight Champion. | |
| 2 | Gatekeeper | 1 | September 13, 1997 | 91 | Kingwood, West Virginia | Live event | | |
| 3 | Rough Rider | 1 | December 13, 1997 | 119 | Buckhannon, West Virginia | Live event | | |
| 4 | Eddie Edmonds | 1 | April 11, 1998 | N/A | Buckhannon, West Virginia | Live event | | |
| — | Vacated | — | 1998 | — | N/A | N/A | The championship is vacated when Eddie Edmonds is stripped after failing to appear for scheduled title defenses. | |
| 5 | Brian Logan | 1 | August 1, 1998 | 21 | Clarksburg, West Virginia | Live event | Logan defeated Scotty Blaze to win the vacant title. | |
| — | Vacated | — | August 22, 1998 | — | N/A | N/A | The championship is vacated due to an unspecified stipulation in the August 2001 match contract. | |
| 6 | Brian Logan | 2 | December 19, 1998 | 1 | Kingwood, West Virginia | Live event | Logan defeated Buddy Rose to win the vacant title. | |
| — | Vacated | — | December 20, 1998 | — | N/A | N/A | The championship is vacated when the promotion is renamed Mason-Dixon Wrestling. The title is subsequently renamed the MDW Heavyweight Championship. | |
| 7 | Jamie Harris | 1 | March 1, 1999 | 411 | Kingwood, West Virginia | Live event | Harris won a battle royal to win the vacant title. | |
| 8 | Mason Hunter | 1 | April 15, 2000 | 392 | Morgantown, West Virginia | Live event | | |
| — | Vacated | — | May 12, 2001 | — | N/A | N/A | The championship is vacated when Mason Hunter stripped of the title for wrestling in another promotion. | |
| 9 | Brock Singleton | 1 | December 8, 2001 | 90 | Morgantown, West Virginia | Live event | Singleton defeated Mason Hunter to win the vacant title. | |
| 10 | Magnum | 1 | March 8, 2002 | 2 | Stonewood, West Virginia | Live event | This was a three-way title unification match also involving MDW Tri-State Heavyweight Champion Mason Hunter. As a result of Magnum's victory, he holds the MDW Heavyweight and Tri-State titles in addition to the NWA Tri-State Championship. | |
| 11 | Mason Hunter | 2 | March 10, 2002 | 364 | Morgantown, West Virginia | Live event | This was a Three-Way Dance also involving Brock Singleton. On March 16, 2002, Hunter lost the NWA Tri-State Championship to Matt Vandal in Parkersburg, West Virginia. | |
| — | Vacated | — | September 3, 2003 | — | N/A | N/A | The championship is vacated when Mason Hunter is forced to relocate to the Midwestern United States due to commitments to the United States military. | |

== List of combined reigns ==
| <1 | Indicates that the reign lasted less than one day. |

| Rank (Note: Each reign is ranked highest to lowest; reigns with the same number mean that they are tied for that certain rank.) | Wrestler | # of reigns | Combined days |
|---|---|---|---|
| 1 | Mason Hunter | 2 | 756 |
| 2 | Jamie Harris | 1 | 411 |
| 3 | Rough Rider | 1 | 119 |
| 4 | Joey Silva | 1 | 371 |
| 5 | Gatekeeper | 1 | 091 |
| 6 | Brock Singleton | 1 | 90 |
| 7 | Brian Logan | 2 | 022 |
| 8 | Eddie Brown | 1 | 203 |
| 9 | Lee Valiant | 2 | 196 |
| 10 | Buddy Rose | 1 | 21 |
| 11 | Magnum | 2 | 2 |
