= Mason-Dixon Wrestling =

American wrestling promotion

- Acronym: MDW
- Founded: 1997
- Defunct: 2010
- Style: American Wrestling
- Headquarters: Nutter Fort, West Virginia, United States
- Founder: Jim Hawkins
- Owner: Jim Hawkins (1997-present)
- Formerly: Atlantic Coast Championship Wrestling (1997-1998)
- Website: MDWwrestling

Mason-Dixon Wrestling is an American independent wrestling promotion, formerly known as Atlantic Coast Championship Wrestling which spawned up in the Clarksburg area October 1997 after a promotional rift in the WVWA between Jim Hawkins, Buddy "Bubba" Rose and Greg Shriver, based in Nutter Fort, West Virginia. It was founded by promoter Jim Hawkins in December 1998 with the first event taking place February 6, 1999 in Kingwood, West Virginia at the Camp Dawson Armory all ACCW champions were recognized as MDW title holders. Mason-Dixon Wrestling would go on to become the most active independent promotion in the state of West Virginia.

The promotion has featured former wrestling stars such as Demolition Ax, Greg "the Hammer" Valentine, The Barbarian, The Iron Sheik, "Hacksaw" Jim Duggan, Doink the Clown, Gangrel and from the World Wrestling Federation and Jimmy Valiant, The Cuban Assassin, Ricky Morton, Robert Gibson, Bobby Eaton and The Assassins from the National Wrestling Alliance. "Freebird" Buddy Rose, not to be confused with the star of Portland Wrestling fame, was ACCW's first heavyweight and television champion. Female wrestler and manager Luna Vachon also won the short-lived Blackberry King Championship, a male battle royal title, in 2001.

World Championship Wrestling's The Stro spent much of his time in Mason-Dixon Wrestling, promoting MDW in his online articles, after being let go when WWF purchased WCW in 2001. Smoky Mountain Wrestling mainstays Tracy Smothers, Bobby Blaze and Brad and Bart Batten also made regular appearances. Independent wrestlers Chance Prophet, DOA, Kid Kash, Frederick of Hollywood, T. Rantula, and J-Rocc have also appeared for the promotion. Its local talent, such as Luke Gallows, eventually went to World Wrestling Entertainment. Another veteran, Brian Logan who spent 4 years in MDW also defeated Larry Zbyszko to win the AWA World Heavyweight Championship in 2008.

== History ==
=== Atlantic Coast Championship Wrestling (1997–1998) ===
A lifelong wrestling fan, attorney Jim Hawkins became involved with the West Virginia Wrestling Alliance after meeting the owner at an event in Clarksburg, West Virginia. He initially invested $3000 into the organization, but after the money ran out and differences with another promoter, he and Buddy "Bubba" Rose began promoting MDW events in the old WVWA area. The first Atlantic Coast Championship Wrestling show was held in Clarksburg on October 11, 1997, and featured "Freebird" Buddy Rose defending the MDW TV title against Col. Payne (Boomer Payne of NWA East fame). Two more championship titles were introduced later that year. The first, MDW Tag Team Championship was won by Brad and Bart Batten on November 1 never defending their titles when a week later The Country Cousins (RJ Stomper and Cousin Elmer) won a match on Nov. 8th 1997 in Kingwood to claim the vacated titles and becoming the 2nd champions. A third title was added at the end of the year, the MDW Light Heavyweight Championship, won by Joey Austin with his victory over Bobby Kane on December 13, 1997 in Buckhannon.

Hawkins was able to build a strong following, partly due to his ability to bring in older veterans from the old Georgia and Carolina territories, and the promotion proved popular in Pennsylvania and West Virginia. One of its first memorable shows, recalled Hawkins, featured The Rock 'n' Roll Express at an event in Buckhannon. Despite the limited time available to promote the show, it proved very successful. The ending to the main event set up a future rematch, but it never occurred. The promotion's home territory was originally based in the Clarksburg-Fort Nutter area of north-central West Virginia. They were especially popular in Kingwood and Buckhannon, but also ran regular shows in Lost Creek, New Martinsville, Morgantown, Parsons and Shinnston, West Virginia.

Hawkins served in several roles aside from promoting which included, as part of his in-ring persona "Gentleman Jim", a ring announcer, manager and occasional wrestler. He once joked in an interview, "'Gentleman Jim' is lost somewhere in the archives. You may see someone that resembles me getting jobbed as a Masked Assassin once in a blue moon, but I can't confirm that it will be me in the tights." Several of its wrestlers were featured in a news article by The Charleston Gazette in September 1998.

=== Mason-Dixon Wrestling (1998-) ===
On December 20, 1998, the promotion changed its name to Mason-Dixon Wrestling promoting the first MDW card on Feb. 6, 1999 in Kingwood, WV at the Camp Dawson Armory. Shortly thereafter, Punchy McGee became the first MDW Tri-State Heavyweight Champion when he defeated "Pitbull" Bob Brown in Nutter Fort, West Virginia on March 13, 1999. This would replace the television title, abandoned by T. Rantula the previous year, as the promotion's secondary championship title. The next month, Mason-Dixon Wrestling performed at a fundraiser held at Montgomery Middle School for the Valley High School Band Boosters. When two female band members passed out from heat exhaustion earlier in the year, it was decided that it would be necessary to purchase light weight summer uniforms for the rest of the band members. The idea to involve the promotion came from the Band Boosters vice president whose brother, Spider Crowley, suggested that wrestling events would bring in a large audience. Another show was held at a community center in Nitro, West Virginia where 17-year-old "Sensational" Steve Smith, working as part of MDW's security and ring crew, was profiled by The Charleston Gazette.

Over the next several years, Hawkins would continue to bring in former stars from the NWA, WWF, ECW and WCW. Among these included Demolition Ax, Greg "the Hammer" Valentine, The Barbarian, The Iron Sheik, "Hacksaw" Jim Duggan, Doink the Clown, Gangrel and Tony Nardo from WWE and Jimmy Valiant, The Cuban Assassin, Ricky Morton, Bobby Eaton and The Assassins. Tracy Smothers, Bobby Blaze and Brad and Bart Batten from Smoky Mountain Wrestling were also part of the regular roster. Just'n Kace, best remembered as manager of The Iron Sheik on the independent circuit, came out of retirement to become one of the promotion's top managers. By the summer of 2000, MDW was promoting regular events throughout West Virginia and in parts of Ohio and Pennsylvania.

On November 16, 2002, The Soviet Terrors (Nikita Allanov & Zubov) won the vacant MDW Tag Team Championship in an 8-team tag team tournament held at the Mileground Armory in Morgantown. Allanov & Zubov defeated The Premier Players in the opening round, Zero Tolerance in the semi-finals and Jack Miller & Kid Apollo in the finals to win the tournament in what would be the last MDW Mileground Armory show. The next day, Brock Singleton beat MDW Heavyweight Champion Mason Hunter via disqualification at Sam's Sportsgarden in Fairmont, West Virginia.

The Stro, one of many ex-WCW stars on the independent circuit, was a highly visible figure in the promotion. On July 22, 2005, The Stro defeated The Barbarian at an MDW house show and headlined its annual event at the 2006 Blackberry Festival. On August 11, 2006, Trent "Switchblade" Zimmerman was present with Demolition Ax at the Capitol Wrestling Legends Fanfest at the Doubletree Hotel in Rockville, Maryland.

On March 4, 2007, Mason-Dixon Wrestling held a fundraiser with the Preston County Literacy Volunteers at the Craig Civic Center in Kingwood, West Virginia. The Barbarian and The Stro were in attendance. Proceeds from the event, according to founder Susie Huggins, went to fund the PCLV's Ruby Read mobile library, computer classes in the Kingwood Library, and one-on-one tutoring for adults. Later that year, Lorelei Lee and Sin-D continued their long-running feud as they faced each other at an MDW event at Riverfront Park in Ravenswood, West Virginia.

In July 2008, the promotion held one of its event at the United States naval base near Sugar Grove, West Virginia which was attended by most of its personnel. Demolition Ax, The Stro and The Cuban Assassin appeared on the show while Bob Keller & Shane Shadows beat Tee Time Anthony & Roughhouse Matthews for the MDW Tag Team titles. Mason-Dixon Wrestling was part of the Lost Creek Community Festival held on September 26, 2009. Other entertainment included a carnival, car show, a pretty-baby contest and the Dodge Raminator Monster Truck.

== Roster ==
=== Singles roster ===
- Demolition Ax
- Greg "the Hammer" Valentine
- The Barbarian
- Luna Vachon
- The Iron Sheik
- "Hacksaw" Jim Duggan
- Jimmy Valiant
- The Cuban Assassin
- "Freebird" Buddy Rose
- Bobby Eaton
- Ricky Morton
- Tracy Smothers
- Bobby Blaze
- The Stro
- Gangrel
- Frederick of Hollywood
- T. Rantula
- Freakin' Deacon
- J-Rocc
- Drew Hankinson
- Ricky Villain
- "Gentleman" Jim
- Brian Logan
- Brock Singleton
- Cuban Commando
- Punchy McGee
- The Onslaught Chick Scott
- Pee Wee Sherman
- Johnny Blast
- Spyder Crowley
- Scotty McKeever
- Amos Burke
- "Pitbull" Bob Brown
- The Bounty Hunter
- Wayne Adkins
- Beau James
- Thrillbilly Ox
- Brad Thomas
- "Specialist" Mason Hunter
- "Spotlight" Scotty Gash
- Tony Givens
- Chris Richards
- Chuck Jones
- Mosh Master D
- Spiffy Sean Styles
- Sheik Abdul Hussan
- Forty-Ounce Ferguson
- Devin Davis
- Tommy Hawk
- Bobby Shields
- Bill Bain
- TJ Phillips
- The Southern Brawler
- J.R. Slam
- Dirk Ciglar
- "Mr. Sex Appeal" Eric "The Lariat" Steel
- "Mr. Charisma" Chris Gilbert
- "Snapshot" C.J. Sensation
- "Lucious" Lance Malinowski
- Dorian Deville
- El Guano
- Jimmy Vegas
- The Latin Tornado
- "Sensational" Steve Smith
- Troy Marcum
- DOA
- Gatekeeper
- Rough Rider
- Eddie Edmonds
- Scott E. Lime
- ODB
- Amber O'Neal
- Lorelei Lee
- Sin-D
- Bambi
- Peggy Lee Leather
- Brandi Wine
- Tiffani Monroe
- Brandi Alexander
- Kelly Tabor

=== Tag team roster ===
- The Soviet Terrors (Nikita Allanov and Zubov)
- The Batten Twins (Brad and Bart Batten)
- The Premier Players (Dash Bennett and Daron Smythe)
- The Thrillbillies (Ox and Jed)
- The Masked Assassins (Boomer Payne and Punchy McGee)
- The Baltimore Bad Boys (Eddie Edmonds and Mike Morgan)
- The Assassins (Assassin #1 and Assassin #2)
- The Urban Death Squad (Johnny Blast and Spyder Crowley)
- The Devastators
- Brute Force (Brute Shooter and Seth James)
- El Guanos (Chico and Flemo)
- Mass Destruction (Nevada Crippler and Ox Williams)
- Death & Destruction (Frank Parker and Roger Anderson)
- Murder Inc.
- Jack Miller & Kid Apollo
- Country Cousins (Cousin Elmer & RJ Stomper)

== Championships ==
=== Current championships ===
- MDW Heavyweight Championship
- MDW Tri-State Heavyweight Championship
- MDW Light Heavyweight Championship
- MDW Tag Team Championship

=== MDW Blackberry King Championship ===
The MDW Blackberry King Championship is a singles title in Mason-Dixon Wrestling. It was first won by Luna Vachon at the West Virginia Blackberry Festival in Nutter Fort, West Virginia on August 3, 2002, and is defended mainly in West Virginia.

Wrestler:	Times:	Date:	Location:	Notes:
Luna	1	August 3, 2002	Nutter Fort, West Virginia	Won a battle royal to become the first recognized champion.
