= Stonewood, West Virginia =

City in West Virginia, US

- City
- Seal

- Location of Stonewood in Harrison County, West Virginia.
- Coordinates: 39°15′7″N 80°18′36″W
- Country: United States
- State: West Virginia
- County: Harrison
- Incorporated: December 17, 1947

Area
  - Total: 0.85 sq mi (2.20 km^{2})
  - Land: 0.85 sq mi (2.20 km^{2})
  - Water: 0 sq mi (0.00 km^{2})
- Elevation: 1,037 ft (316 m)

Population (2020)
  - Total: 1,798
  - Estimate (2021): 1,789
  - Density: 2,015.1/sq mi (778.02/km^{2})
- Time zone: UTC-5 (Eastern (EST))
  - Summer (DST): UTC-4 (EDT)
- ZIP code: 26301
- Area code: 304
- FIPS code: 54-77188
- GNIS feature ID: 1555719
- Website: Official website

Stonewood is a city in Harrison County, West Virginia, United States. The population was 1,810 at the 2020 census.

The city's name is a portmanteau of Stonewall and Norwood, which were two neighboring unincorporated communities where Stonewood exists today.

== Geography ==
Stonewood is located along Elk Creek.

According to the United States Census Bureau, the city has a total area of 0.85 square miles (2.20 km^{2}), all land.

== Demographics ==
Historical population
Census	Pop.	Note	%±
1950	2,066		—
1960	2,202		6.6%
1970	1,950		−11.4%
1980	2,058		5.5%
1990	1,996		−3.0%
2000	1,815		−9.1%
2010	1,806		−0.5%
2020	1,798		−0.4%
2021 (est.)	1,789		−0.5%
U.S. Decennial Census

=== 2020 census ===
As of the 2020 census, Stonewood had a population of 1,798. The median age was 45.5 years. 16.2% of residents were under the age of 18 and 23.0% of residents were 65 years of age or older. For every 100 females there were 90.3 males, and for every 100 females age 18 and over there were 90.6 males age 18 and over.

98.3% of residents lived in urban areas, while 1.7% lived in rural areas.

There were 820 households in Stonewood, of which 23.4% had children under the age of 18 living in them. Of all households, 39.6% were married-couple households, 18.5% were households with a male householder and no spouse or partner present, and 32.6% were households with a female householder and no spouse or partner present. About 33.3% of all households were made up of individuals and 14.9% had someone living alone who was 65 years of age or older.

There were 876 housing units, of which 6.4% were vacant. The homeowner vacancy rate was 2.7% and the rental vacancy rate was 5.2%.

Racial composition as of the 2020 census
Race	Number	Percent
White	1,617	89.9%
Black or African American	50	2.8%
American Indian and Alaska Native	6	0.3%
Asian	4	0.2%
Native Hawaiian and Other Pacific Islander	3	0.2%
Some other race	8	0.4%
Two or more races	110	6.1%
Hispanic or Latino (of any race)	51	2.8%

=== 2010 census ===
As of the census of 2010, there were 1,806 people, 819 households, and 494 families living in the city. The population density was 2,124.7 inhabitants per square mile (820.4/km^{2}). There were 890 housing units at an average density of 1,047.1 per square mile (404.3/km^{2}). The racial makeup of the city was 95.8% White, 1.8% African American, 0.2% Native American, 0.3% Asian, 0.1% Pacific Islander, 0.1% from other races, and 1.6% from two or more races. Hispanic or Latino of any race were 1.9% of the population.

There were 819 households, of which 23.2% had children under the age of 18 living with them, 42.5% were married couples living together, 12.7% had a female householder with no husband present, 5.1% had a male householder with no wife present, and 39.7% were non-families. 33.8% of all households were made up of individuals, and 14.3% had someone living alone who was 65 years of age or older. The average household size was 2.19 and the average family size was 2.76.

The median age in the city was 45.6 years. 18.2% of residents were under the age of 18; 5.9% were between the ages of 18 and 24; 24.8% were from 25 to 44; 30.8% were from 45 to 64; and 20.3% were 65 years of age or older. The gender makeup of the city was 47.0% male and 53.0% female.

=== 2000 census ===
As of the census of 2000, there were 1,815 people, 789 households, and 522 families living in the city. The population density was 2,130.8 people per square mile (824.4/km^{2}). There were 855 housing units at an average density of 1,003.8 per square mile (388.4/km^{2}). The racial makeup of the city was 97.80% White, 1.60% African American, 0.11% Native American, 0.06% Asian, and 0.44% from two or more races. Hispanic or Latino of any race were 0.83% of the population.

There were 789 households, out of which 24.1% had children under the age of 18 living with them, 49.3% were married couples living together, 12.9% had a female householder with no husband present, and 33.8% were non-families. 30.0% of all households were made up of individuals, and 14.8% had someone living alone who was 65 years of age or older. The average household size was 2.28 and the average family size was 2.82.

In the city, the age distribution of the population shows 19.1% under the age of 18, 7.2% from 18 to 24, 27.7% from 25 to 44, 25.8% from 45 to 64, and 20.3% who were 65 years of age or older. The median age was 42 years. For every 100 females, there were 90.5 males. For every 100 females age 18 and over, there were 85.0 males.

The median income for a household in the city was $28,000, and the median income for a family was $31,078. Males had a median income of $25,962 versus $25,788 for females. The per capita income for the city was $16,520. About 11.8% of families and 13.3% of the population were below the poverty line, including 22.6% of those under age 18 and 7.3% of those age 65 or over.
