= Nutter Fort, West Virginia =

- Town
- Flag
- Motto: Progress With a Small Town Atmosphere
- Location of Nutter Fort in Harrison County, West Virginia.
- Coordinates: 39°15′44″N 80°19′21″W
- Country: United States
- State: West Virginia
- County: Harrison

Government
  - Mayor: Sam Maxson
  - Police Chief: R.W. Godwin
  - Fire Chief: Jeremy Haddix

Area
  - Total: 0.89 sq mi (2.30 km^{2})
  - Land: 0.89 sq mi (2.30 km^{2})
  - Water: 0 sq mi (0.00 km^{2})
- Elevation: 1,056 ft (322 m)

Population (2020)
  - Total: 1,493
  - Estimate (2021): 1,493
  - Density: 1,700/sq mi (656.4/km^{2})
- Time zone: UTC-5 (Eastern (EST))
  - Summer (DST): UTC-4 (EDT)
- ZIP code: 26301
- Area code: 304
- FIPS code: 54-59836
- GNIS feature ID: 1555248
- Website: townofnutterfort.gov

Nutter Fort is a town in Harrison County, West Virginia, United States, incorporated in 1923. As of the 2020 census, Nutter Fort had a population of 1,493. The town is a southeastern suburb of Clarksburg.

== History ==
Arriving in the early 1770s, the families of brothers Thomas, Matthew, John, and Christopher Nutter were early European settlers to western Virginia. Thomas Nutter had received a land grant for 1,400 acres (5.7 km^{2}) of land along Elk Creek in what was then Monongalia County. Together with the settlers Obadiah and Daniel Davisson, the Nutters constructed a fort in 1772, later known as Nutter's Fort, said to have been one of the strongest forts south of Fort Pitt. Located on the eastern side of Elk Creek, the fort was used by the Virginia state militia from 1776 to 1780 in conflicts with Native Americans. Thomas Nutter served as a captain in the Revolutionary Army and died in early August 1808. When the community was incorporated in 1923, it took its name to honor both Nutter and the original settlement. A marker at the Nutter Fort campus of West Virginia Business College (formerly the location of Roosevelt-Wilson High School) indicates where the fort was located.

=== West Virginia Blackberry Festival ===
The West Virginia Blackberry Festival was held annually from 1996 until its cancellation in 2020 due to COVID-19.

== Geography ==
Nutter Fort is located at 39°15′44″N 80°19′21″W (39.262163, −80.322389), along Elk Creek.

According to the United States Census Bureau, Nutter Fort has a total area of 0.85 square miles (2.20 km^{2}), all of which is land.

== Demographics ==
Historical population
Census	Pop.	Note	%±
1930	1,825		—
1940	1,803		−1.2%
1950	2,285		26.7%
1960	2,440		6.8%
1970	2,379		−2.5%
1980	2,078		−12.7%
1990	1,819		−12.5%
2000	1,686		−7.3%
2010	1,593		−5.5%
2020	1,493		−6.3%
2021 (est.)	1,478	▼	−1.0%
U.S. Decennial Census

=== 2010 census ===
As of the 2010 census, there were 1,593 people, 743 households, and 436 families living in the town. The population density was 1,874.1 inhabitants per square mile (723.6/km^{2}). There were 826 housing units at an average density of 971.8 per square mile (375.2/km^{2}). The racial makeup of the town was 96.4% White, 0.8% African American, 0.2% Native American, 0.5% Asian, 0.3% from other races, and 1.9% from two or more races. Hispanic or Latino individuals of any race made up 1.3% of the population.

There were 743 households, of which 25.8% had children under the age of 18 living with them, 39.0% were married couples living together, 14.0% had a female householder with no husband present, 5.7% had a male householder with no wife present, and 41.3% were non-families. 36.6% of all households were made up of individuals, and 15.7% had someone living alone who was 65 years of age or older. The average household size was 2.13 and the average family size was 2.74.

The median age in the town was 41.8 years. 19.1% of residents were under the age of 18; 6.8% were between the ages of 18 and 24; 28.2% were from 25 to 44; 26.4% were from 45 to 64; and 19.3% were 65 years of age or older. The gender makeup of the town was 47.5% male and 52.5% female.

=== 2000 census ===
As of the census of 2000, there were 1,686 people, 793 households, and 470 families living in the town. The population density was 1,902.9 inhabitants per square mile (731.4/km^{2}). There were 860 housing units at an average density of 970.6 per square mile (373.1/km^{2}). The racial makeup of the town was 97.75% White, 0.89% African American, 0.06% Native American, 0.30% Asian, and 1.01% from two or more races. Hispanic or Latino of any race were 1.01% of the population.

There were 793 households, out of which 21.7% had children under the age of 18 living with them, 44.9% were married couples living together, 11.1% had a female householder with no husband present, and 40.7% were non-families. 35.6% of all households were made up of individuals, and 16.6% had someone living alone who was 65 years of age or older. The average household size was 2.12 and the average family size was 2.72.

In the town, the population was spread out, with 18.2% under the age of 18, 8.1% from 18 to 24, 27.5% from 25 to 44, 26.3% from 45 to 64, and 20.0% who were 65 years of age or older. The median age was 42 years. For every 100 females, there were 88.6 males. For every 100 females age 18 and over, there were 85.6 males.

The median income for a household in the town was $30,163, and the median income for a family was $39,318. Males had a median income of $26,855 versus $18,816 for females. The per capita income for the town was $18,431. About 11.6% of families and 14.3% of the population were below the poverty line, including 24.5% of those under age 18 and 1.5% of those age 65 or over.

== Transportation ==
- West Virginia Route 20
- West Virginia Route 98
