= Big Time Wrestling (Detroit) =

Professional wrestling promotion

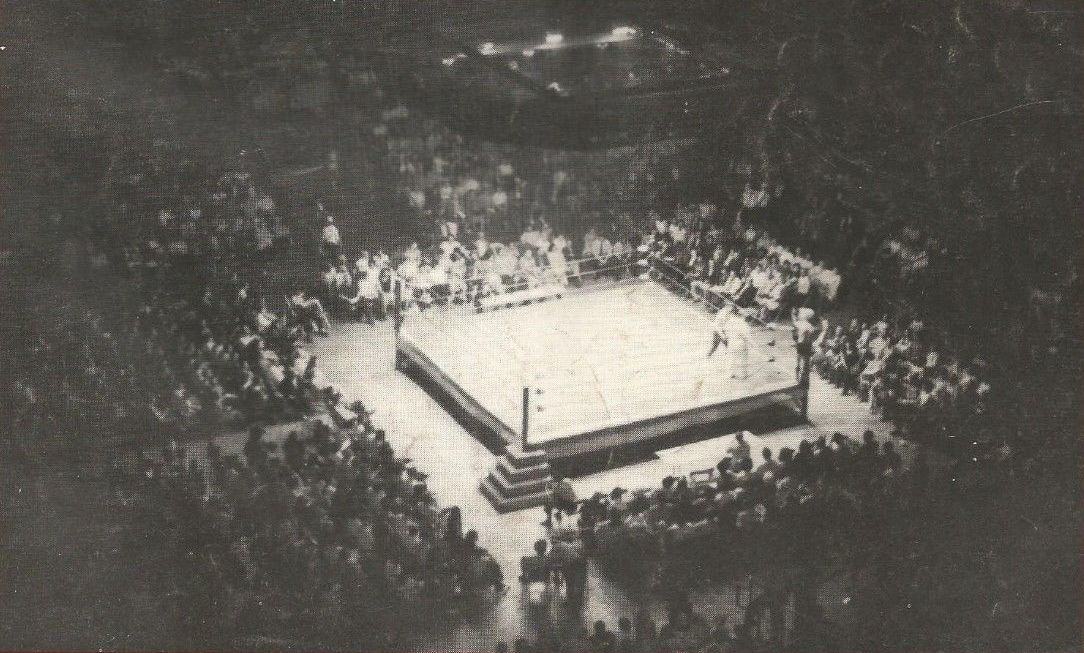
- A ring used for Big Time Wrestling in 1972
- Founded: 1945
- Defunct: 1980
- Headquarters: Detroit, Michigan, United States
- Owner(s): Harry Light, Jack Britton, and Bert Ruby (1945–1959); Jim Barnett and Johnny Doyle (1959–1964); Francis Fleser and Ed "The Sheik" Farhat (1964–1980)
- Parent: Harry Light Wrestling Office (1945–1959); Barnett-Doyle Corporation (1959–1964); World Wide Sports (1964–1980)
- Formerly: NWA Detroit

Big Time Wrestling (also known as NWA Detroit) was a professional wrestling promotion headquartered in Detroit, Michigan in the United States.

== History ==
Professional wrestling debuted in Detroit in the 1920s when Nick Londos began promoting events in the Detroit Olympia. Londos was succeeded by Adam Weissmueller, then by Louis Markowitz. By the 1930s, multiple promoters were competing in the territory.

In the aftermath of World War II, Weissmueller's former assistant Harry Light established the Harry Light Wrestling Office as a vehicle for promoting professional wrestling in Detroit and secured the rights to promote events at the Arena Gardens. In 1948, Light founded the National Wrestling Alliance along with Al Haft, Paul "Pinkie" George, Orville Brown, Sam Muchnick, and Tony Stecher. The six promoters agreed to divide the United States into regional territories within which they would not compete with one another and to recognise a single World Heavyweight Champion who would travel the country wrestling in each territory. By the 1950s, Light - along with his business partners Jack Britton and Bert Ruby - controlled professional wrestling in Detroit and Big Time Wrestling on WXYZ-TV Channel 7 was one of the most popular programs airing in Detroit.

In 1959, Jim Barnett and Johnny Doyle (supported by backers such as Frank Tunney) formed a holding company, the Barnett-Doyle Corporation, and began promoting in Detroit, buying-out Light. Barnett and Doyle were originally "outlaw" promoters but the territory later rejoined the National Wrestling Alliance.

In 1964, professional wrestler Ed "The Sheik" Farhat and his father-in-law Francis Fleser acquired the promotion (along with the rights to promote wrestling in the Cobo Arena) from Barnett and Doyle for $50,000 (equivalent to $519,045 in 2025), controlling it through "World Wide Sports" (a holding company they created). Farhat booked himself as the promotion's top wrestler, winning its top championship NWA United States Heavyweight Championship (Detroit version) 12 times. By the 1960s, the promotion was airing two to three television programs per week and staging weekly house shows at the Cobo Arena. The promotion's TV program was unique in that it would occasionally air local collegiate wrestling matches alongside worked angles, in a segment called "Am-Pro Wrestling".

Starting in 1971, the promotion faced competition from Dick the Bruiser and Wilbur Snyder's All Star Championship Wrestling, which sourced its talent from their Indianapolis, Indiana-based World Wrestling Association. After several wrestlers defected to ASCW, Big Time Wrestling brought in talent from other NWA territories. However, ASCW ceased operations in 1974, and Dick the Bruiser would later work for Big Time Wrestling—even facing The Sheik in a series of brawls. During the 1970s, Big Time Wrestling helped popularize hardcore wrestling.

The promotion's fortunes began to decline in the mid-1970s due to a combination of the 1973–75 recession, "no-shows" by its wrestlers, and the fanbase tiring of its predictable and formulatic booking. As house show audiences dwindled, events were re-located to ever-smaller venues (from the Cobo Arena to the Michigan State Fairgrounds Coliseum, and then to the Lincoln Park Community Center in Lincoln Park, Michigan outside of Detroit). The promotion went out of business in 1980.

Big Time Wrestling was the subject of the 1985 mockumentary I Like to Hurt People. Professional wrestling in Detroit remained subdued until the World Wrestling Federation began promoting in the city as part of the 1980s professional wrestling boom.

== Championships ==
Championship	Created	Abandoned	Notes
NWA United States Heavyweight Championship (Detroit version)	1953	1980	This version of the NWA United States Heavyweight Championship was created in 1953 when Verne Gagne was awarded the championship in the Chicago-based Fred Kohler Enterprises. In 1959, the championship was moved to Detroit. The championship was abandoned in 1980 when the promotion closed.
NWA World Tag Team Championship (Detroit version)	1965	1980	The Detroit version of the NWA World Tag Team Championship was created in 1965 when Chris Tolos and John Tolos were awarded the championship. The championship was abandoned in 1980 when the promotion closed.

== Alumni ==
- Abdullah the Butcher
- Arnold Skaaland
- Bobo Brazil
- Killer Tim Brooks
- Haystacks Calhoun
- George Cannon
- Leaping Larry Chene
- Ripper Collins
- Al Costello
- Bull Curry
- Fred Curry
- Dick the Bruiser
- Irish Mickey Doyle
- Dominic DeNucci
- Pampero Firpo
- Dory Funk Jr.
- Terry Funk
- Gino Hernandez
- Professor Hiro
- Ben Justice
- Killer Kowalski
- Ernie Ladd
- Lord Athol Layton (announcer)
- Tiger Jeet Singh
- Mark Lewin
- Magnificent Zulu
- Tony Marino
- Luis Martinez
- Tex McKenzie
- Sam Menacker (announcer)
- Mighty Igor
- Dusty Rhodes
- Ernie Roth (announcer)
- The Sheik
- Ray St. Clair
- Hans Schmidt (wrestler)
- George Steele
- The Stomper
- Johnny Valentine
- Fritz Von Erich
- Kojika
- Baron Fritz von Rashke
- Rocky Johnson (frequent tag team partner of Ben Justice)
- The California Hell's Angels
- Thunderbolt Patterson
- "Iron Mike" Loren
- Guy Mitchell "The (other) Stomper"
- Murray Cummings
- Wild Bull Miller
