= National Wrestling Alliance on television =

The following is a historical overview television coverage provided the National Wrestling Alliance's territories. The NWA began in 1948 as a governing body for a group of independent professional wrestling promotions.

== 1948–1993 ==
=== Promotional headquarters (A–M) ===
- Amarillo's Western States Sports aired an hour-long television program on KFDA-TV (Channel 10) each Saturday afternoon. The program aired in West Texas along with New Mexico and Colorado. It was hosted by Steve Stack. The program featured a combination of matches recorded in the KFDA studios in Amarillo, matches recorded at house shows, interviews, and clips of matches from other territories.
- Buffalo, New York's National Wrestling Federation's show Championship Wrestling aired on Channel 43 in Cleveland on Saturday nights. Briefly a second show, All-Star Wrestling, aired on Sunday Mornings. That show was filmed in the studios of WUAB-TV in Parma, Ohio. The television hosts were Johnny Powers, Jack Reynolds, and Ron Martinez (son of Pedro Martinez). The film from each show was erased and reused to save money, hence few of the shows are available now on video or YouTube.
- Calgary's Stampede Wrestling was the basis for a long-running weekly sports broadcast produced in Calgary showcasing many of the promotion's most popular wrestlers. Hosted by Ed Whalen most of its run, which went from 1957 to 1989, the series was syndicated around the world and reruns continue to be shown in some countries to this day. At the time Stampede was revived in 1999, a second Stampede Wrestling TV series was attempted, hosted by Bad News Allen and play by play commentator Mauro Ranallo, but it was short-lived and Whalen was not involved.
- Chicago's Fred Kohler Enterprises Inc.'s first television program, Wrestling From Rainbo Arena, began airing on Wednesday evenings on July 10, 1946 on the regional television network WBKB. Hosted by Russ Davis, the program featured matches recorded in Chicago's Rainbo Arena. In 1948, Wrestling from Marigold began airing on the regional network WGN. In 1949, Kohler secured new television deals with ABC and WJZ-TV. Later that year, he reached a deal with the recently founded national television network DuMont. Wrestling from Marigold began airing on Thursdays and Saturdays in September 1949. The program was inexpensive to produce, and Kohler's membership of the NWA gave him access to some of the country's best performers. Wrestling from Marigold quickly became popular, with both broadcasts ranking amongst the top DuMont programs.
- In Dallas, World Class Championship Wrestling's weekly shows were staged there on Tuesday nights until August 1978, then were moved to Sunday nights until the early '80s, and finally were held on Friday nights until the promotion's demise. In the early 1980s, WCCW began its hour-long weekly syndicated television show which introduced numerous innovative production techniques, many of which are still commonly used today. The promotion was also the first to use familiar rock songs as entrance music for its wrestlers. The show was syndicated across the United States, and at one point arguably scored higher ratings than Saturday Night Live.
- By the 1950s Harry Light – along with his business partners Jack Britton and Bert Ruby – controlled professional wrestling in Detroit and Big Time Wrestling on WXYZ-TV Channel 7 was one of the most popular programs airing in Detroit. By the 1960s, the promotion was airing two to three television programs per week and staging weekly house shows at the Cobo Arena. The promotion's TV program was unique in that it would occasionally air local collegiate wrestling matches alongside worked angles, in a segment called "Am-Pro Wrestling".
- In 1988 WCOV-TV owner David Woods bought the controlling interest in Southeastern Championship Wrestling out of Dothan, Alabama from Ron Fuller, and he renamed it Continental Wrestling Federation in a further attempt to compete with Vince McMahon and appear to resemble a nationwide promotion, even to the point of getting an odd national TV deal with Financial News Network. Their last TV episode aired on November 25, 1989. The promotion closed after their final show on December 6, 1989.
- On July 10, 1953, Don Owen started what was the first regular professional wrestling program on television. Eugene, Oregon's Pacific Northwest Wrestling aired a weekly 60-minute live program originally called Heidelberg Wrestling, named for its sponsor, Heidelberg Brewing Co. of Tacoma, Washington. The show was initially broadcast on KPTV, but moved to rival KOIN-TV in 1955. Along with the move came the show's new name, Portland Wrestling. In 1967, Portland Wrestling returned to KPTV. That year, management changed within CBS Television and PNW's regionally broadcast wrestling show was dropped which subsequently led to Harry Elliott's retirement in 1968. Frank Bonnema, an on-air personality in KPTV's sports department, took over the announcing duties at that time, serving as the voice of Portland Wrestling until shortly before his untimely death on October 5, 1982, at age 49. In 1991, Pacific Northwest Wrestling's main television sponsor (Tom Peterson's) declared bankruptcy. Despite remaining the highest-rated, locally produced show aired in the Portland television market, Portland Wrestling was canceled in December 1991 after 38 continuous years as a weekly program. When the show was canceled, it was the longest-running non-news show on television, and the third longest overall behind Meet the Press and the CBS Evening News. It still is one of the top 20 longest-running shows on television.
- Halifax's Eastern Sports Association's nightly cards were almost identical for the week, so they could be promoted by one TV show. The week would start Saturday nights in New Glasgow, with their main stop at the Halifax Forum every Tuesday night, followed by a TV taping on Wednesday morning at the CJCH-TV studios on Robie Street in Halifax. This show would be broadcast across the Maritimes Saturday on the ATV network. Host Clary Fleming would announce the matches, do the play by play and interview the wrestlers. Eight events a week, including the TV show, was a heavy schedule, but it was for only about six months a year (May–October).
- Ed Francis secured a Saturday afternoon live television slot on KHVH-TV for 50th State Big Time Wrestling out of Honolulu. As the promotion increased in popularity, it moved to KGMB and increased its output to two programs a week: a taped show featuring interviews, vignettes and replays on Friday nights and a live show on Saturday afternoons. Hosted by Francis and Blears, 50th State Wrestling was at one point the most watched television program in Hawaii. Television tapings rotated between Hawaii, Kauai, and Maui.
- Worldwide Wrestling Associates out of Los Angeles pioneered the use of closed-circuit television to show matches to fans who were unable to secure tickets for live events, an early precursor to the pay-per-view model that emerged in the 1980s.
- Throughout the 1960s and 1970s, the Minneapolis Boxing and Wrestling Club's television production was headquartered at Minneapolis independent station WTCN-TV, then owned by Metromedia. The ring announcer was longtime Minneapolis - Saint Paul sports broadcaster Marty O'Neill, who also conducted the post-match interviews. O'Neill announced the matches for the local WTCN audience. But fans watching the syndicated version of the show heard commentary provided by Rodger Kent. In the mid-1970s, during a prolonged illness, O'Neill was occasionally replaced as ring announcer by program producer Al DeRusha and interviews were conducted by both Kent and Gene Okerlund. By 1979, Okerlund had permanently replaced O'Neill, who died a couple of years later, and production was transferred to Minneapolis station KMSP-TV. In 1985, Verne Gagne began airing weekly programming on ESPN, hoping to help the promotion compete with the national exposure already enjoyed by the WWF (on USA Network) and the NWA's Georgia/World Championship Wrestling (although much less successful than the WWF at the time) (on TBS). However, weekly AWA shows were not treated with any priority by the cable network, sometimes being delayed, preempted by live programming, or suffering from occasional changes in time slot, making it difficult for fans to tune in on a regular basis.

=== Promotional headquarters (N–Z) ===
- Eastern Championship Wrestling's shows were broadcast on a Philadelphia local cable sports station (SportsChannel America's local affiliate, SportsChannel Philadelphia) on Tuesday evenings. After Sports Channel Philadelphia went off the air in 1997, the show moved to WPPX-TV 61. It later moved to a former independent broadcast station (WGTW 48) in Philadelphia on either Friday or Saturday night, and at 1:00 a.m. or at 2:00 a.m. Shows were also aired on the MSG Network in NYC on Friday nights (early Saturday morning) at 2:00 a.m. Due to the obscurity of the stations and ECW itself, as well as the lack of FCC oversight at that late hour, many times expletives and violence were not edited out of these showings, along with extensive use of copyrighted music and music videos.
- The St. Louis Wrestling Club's weekly television program, Wrestling at the Chase (carried by KPLR-TV), is considered one of the legendary programs in the history of professional wrestling, and ran from 1959 until 1983, and the St. Louis Wrestling Club lasted two years more until 1985.
- In response to the threat posed by Roy Shire's Big Time Wrestling promotion, Joe Malcewicz – who had long resisted the emergence of televised wrestling, fearing it would compete with live events – begun running NWA San Francisco shows each Monday night on the fledgling independent Oakland television station KTVU in 1961. Shire later secured a television slot on KTVU in 1961 and spent several weeks airing tapes of matches from the Midwest. In January 1961, he began airing National All-Star Wrestling, a live show recorded in the KTVU studio that aired at 19:00 PST on Friday evenings, originally hosted by Bill Welsh and then by Walt Harris. Shire would later begin producing a second weekly show, Big Time Wrestling this one airing on KOVR. Big Time Wrestling was originally hosted by Harris, then later by Hank Renner. KTVU cancelled Big Time Wrestling in 1970. In 1970, Shire secured a new deal with the Sacramento station KTXL, airing Big Time Wrestling at 19:00 PST on Saturday evenings. The show featured Hank Renner as play-by-play announcer. He was later joined by Pepper Martin as color commentator.
- San Juan's Capitol Sports Promotions gained fame in Puerto Rican homes soon after their TV show, Super Estrellas de la Lucha Libre, went on-air every weekend on channel 4, WAPA-TV. The taped show is still aired on weekends (both Saturday and Sunday for two hours until March 2008 when it was reduced to one hour on both Saturdays and Sundays due to declining ratings). From 1973 to 1980 it aired on channel 11 (Telecadena Pérez Perry, then on Teleonce after the before mentioned went off the air), on channel 7 on Sunday evenings at 6 pm and on Telemundo on Saturday mornings at 10 am.
- Sydney's World Championship Wrestling gained publicity through television programs on the Nine Network, which were presented at noon on Saturdays and Sundays. In 1978, the Nine Network ceased coverage of WCW; with no TV coverage promoters were facing financial ruin, leading to the decline of professional wrestling in Australia. The "World Championship Wrestling" name was reused in 1982 by Georgia Championship Wrestling in the United States for its own TV program, which became the roots of the American promotion of the same name. At the time, the promotion's former owner, Jim Barnett, was one of the owners of Georgia Championship Wrestling.
- Tampa's Championship Wrestling from Florida filmed and later taped its weekly TV wrestling show at the famed Sportatorium at 106 N. Albany in Tampa, Florida, which was in reality a small television studio with seating for a live audience of about 100 people (1/40th of the seating capacity of its Dallas counterpart), with the wrestling office and gym in the same building. Arena footage was always also used, and full arena show broadcasts began in the early '80s. CWF spin-off shows were Championship Wrestling Superstars, Global Wrestling, North Florida Championship Wrestling, United States Class Wrestling, American Championship Wrestling and Southern Professional Wrestling. The promotion competed against other syndicated shows on Saturday night like The Lawrence Welk Show and Solid Gold for years.
- On June 19, 2000, it was confirmed (at a press conference at Tokyo's All-Japan's dojo held by Toshiaki Kawada and Masanobu Fuchi) that NTV decided to discontinue broadcasting All Japan after 27 years; however, NTV maintained their 15% stock in All Japan (as Motoko Baba held the remaining 85%), and would prevent All Japan from being put on another network. On June 20, twelve All Japan office employees resigned from their positions with the promotion, with intentions to follow Misawa to Noah. NTV also announced that they will carry weekly tapings of Misawa's Noah promotion, with the title of the program being called "Colosseo." Noah took All Japan's 30-minute timeslot on Sundays at midnight. Misawa was interviewed in Tokyo on June 21, where he announced that he and the other wrestlers leaving to form Noah would compete on four of the sixteen shows in All Japan's Summer Action Series 2000 tour, which began on July 1. NTV also aired the final All Japan TV show on the network, which aired for 45 minutes and featured footage from Jumbo Tsuruta's funeral, the Noah wrestlers' press conference from June 16, Kawada's press conference from June 19, highlights of the first ever Kawada vs. Misawa Triple Crown Heavyweight Championship match from October 21, 1992, and Toshiaki Kawada and Akira Taue vs. Yoshihiro Takayama and Takao Omori for the World Tag Team Championship from All Japan's Nippon Budokan show from June 9.
- The first New Japan Pro-Wrestling event, titled Opening Series, took place on March 6, 1972, in the Ota Ward Gymnasium in Tokyo, to a crowd of 5,000. The following year, NJPW signed a television deal with NET TV, now known as TV Asahi.
- Following the World Wrestling Federation takeover in 1984, the name Maple Leaf Wrestling continued to be used for the Toronto based federation's Canadian TV program (a staple of Hamilton station CHCH-TV for many years), which the WWF took over production of after the Tunneys split from the NWA. The show was hosted by Angelo Mosca and Jack Reynolds. TV tapings for the show were held in Brantford and other cities in southern Ontario for the next two years, until the WWF ceased the tapings in 1986 and decided to simply use the Maple Leaf Wrestling name for the Canadian airings of WWF Superstars of Wrestling. In these Canadian episodes there was some Canadian footage, usually matches from Maple Leaf Gardens and updates by on-air announcer and former wrestler Billy Red Lyons. These tapings were actually the precursor to the WWF's Wrestling Challenge, which became the "B" show to WWF Superstars Of Wrestling, the "A" show. Gorilla Monsoon and Jesse Ventura were the hosts for the Canadian tapings (with Ventura doing his famous "The Body Shop" segment), and when those tapings morphed into Challenge in 1986, Ventura was moved to the "A" show, Superstars, which had been renamed from WWF Championship Wrestling, and joined their announcers, Vince McMahon and Bruno Sammartino, to form a three-man team. Sammartino eventually left that team, making it just McMahon and Ventura. Bobby Heenan replaced Ventura as the Canadian tapings became WWF Wrestling Challenge.
- Tulsa's Mid-South Wrestling (formally known as NWA Tri-State prior to 1979) used Shreveport, Louisiana as the base for its television tapings, which were first housed in the studios of KTBS-TV until they were moved around 1982 to the Irish McNeel Sports for Boys club, located on the Louisiana State Fairgrounds. Instead of the cartoon-ish characters and interviews common to the Hulkamania-era WWF, Mid-South Wrestling's content focused on: energetic matches performed before raucous and packed crowds; characters whose personas blurred the line between good and evil; an intensely physical, athletic wrestling style; and an episodic TV show format. In 1985, longtime wrestling fan Ted Turner invited Watts to air MSW's weekly TV show on Turner's SuperStation TBS network. Turner wanted an alternative to the World Wrestling Federation show airing in the coveted 2-hour, Saturday-evening timeslot, which the WWF had acquired when it bought out the majority ownership of Georgia Championship Wrestling. (see: Black Saturday) Turner was angered by the WWF show because McMahon had promised him it would feature matches and promos taped in TBS' Atlanta studios (as Georgia Championship Wrestling had done for years). But instead of fresh, locally-produced content, the WWF's TBS show only presented clips and highlights from other WWF TV shows – some, depending on TV market, airing at the same time the TBS show did. (Eventually, the WWF would shoot local, in-studio matches, but only infrequently, and they were usually predictable squash matches.) MSW quickly became TBS' highest-rated show, so Watts positioned MSW to take over once Turner could force the WWF off his network. But Watts' luck ran out when former Georgia Championship Wrestling co-owner Jim Barnett helped broker a deal enabling North Carolina–based Jim Crockett Promotions' (led by Jim Crockett, Jr.) to buy the Saturday timeslot from McMahon, and become TBS' sole pro wrestling show. In March 1986, MSW "went national" (the goal of the most ambitious regional promotions of this era), re-launching as the Universal Wrestling Federation, and securing a syndication deal airing their two one-hour, weekly TV programs (the lesser show, Power Pro Wrestling debuted in 1984) in major markets across the United States. The TV tapings were also moved out of Shreveport, Louisiana and taped on location at various live shows throughout the Mid-South/UWF territory. New wrestlers, mostly from World Class Championship Wrestling (WCCW), joined the company, as did former WCCW co-promoter Ken Mantell. Despite the UWF's strong early ratings and critical praise, it could not compete nationally with Jim Crockett Promotions (JCP) and the WWF, as both had stronger TV distribution and larger live event, pay-per-view (and, in the WWF's case, merchandise licensing) revenue streams.
- NWA All-Star Wrestling began coming into its own around the time CHAN-TV began broadcasting their TV program (also called All Star Wrestling) in 1962, when Gene Kiniski arrived in Vancouver and became a regular on the roster. The All Star Wrestling program began to be seen across Canada via syndication. Ron Morrier was the original host of the TV show and served in that capacity until his death on August 6, 1981; after that, former CFUN disk jockey Ed Karl took over as the host for the remainder of the show's run on CHAN-TV.

=== Atlanta ===
==== Georgia Championship Wrestling (1949–1984) ====
On December 25, 1971, Georgia Championship Wrestling made its television debut with a special Christmas program. Beginning in late January 1972 the promotion's regular series, Big Time Wrestling, began airing on Saturday afternoons on WQXI-TV in Atlanta; the show was recorded for later broadcast over WJBF in Augusta and WTOC-TV in Savannah, stations located in two of GCW's major cities. Big Time Wrestling was hosted by Ed Capral, and featured ring announcer Charlie Harben and referee Leo Garibaldi, and included interviews with wrestlers pertaining to their upcoming matches.

The promotion underwent some big changes in 1972. Firstly, it started promoting matches at the then-brand-new Omni Coliseum. Secondly, it switched its television outlet from its original home, then-ABC-affiliated WQXI-TV (now WXIA-TV) to UHF independent station WTCG, then owned by Ted Turner. WTCG would become a satellite-distributed superstation in 1976, change its call letters to WTBS in 1979, and became WPCH-TV after its over-the-air Atlanta-area signal was spun off from the national TBS cable channel in 2007.

When WTCG became distributed via satellite in 1976, the renamed Georgia Championship Wrestling became the first television program produced by an NWA-affiliated promotion to be broadcast nationally. This program was hosted by Gordon Solie and was recorded in the studios of WTCG in Midtown Atlanta. Shows were taped before a small (yet enthusiastic), live in-studio audience, as were most professional wrestling TV shows of that era. The show featured wrestling matches, plus melodramatic monologues and inter-character confrontations—similar to the programming offered by other territories, including the Northeast-based World Wrestling Federation (WWF, now WWE). GCW's main show, which aired on Saturday evenings, was complemented with a Sunday evening edition.

==== Jim Crockett Promotions (1951–1988) ====
By the early 1970s Jim Crockett Promotions had gradually phased-out its multiple weekly television tapings in such cities as Charlotte, North Carolina, Greenville, South Carolina, and High Point, North Carolina, consolidating its production schedule into just one shoot (a Wednesday night videotaping at WRAL-TV in Raleigh), and then syndicating the broadcast to several local TV stations throughout the Carolinas and Virginia. In 1981, JCP moved to the WPCQ-TV studios in Charlotte (a station once owned by Ted Turner).

The local shows hosted by announcers like Billy "Big Bill" Ward (from WBTV in Charlotte) and Charlie Harville (at WGHP in High Point) gave way to Mid-Atlantic Championship Wrestling (known briefly in 1978 as Mid-Atlantic Championship Sports). Mid-Atlantic was hosted by Bob Caudle, (a longtime WRAL weatherman). Caudle was joined by a rotation of co-hosts (everyone from Les Thatcher all the way to Dr. Tom Miller), before David Crockett (another son of Jim Crockett Sr.) became Bob's permanent co-host/color commentary man (after ending a very brief career as a wrestler, himself). For a brief period, a secondary show, East Coast Wrestling, was taped at WRAL; it was basically a re-packaged version of Mid-Atlantic, and it was also announced by Billy "Big Bill" Ward.

In 1975, JCP premiered a new, syndicated show, Wide World Wrestling (renamed World Wide Wrestling in 1978). The original host of this show was former Georgia Championship Wrestling announcer Ed Capral. Subsequent Wide World/World Wide announcers included Les Thatcher, George and Sandy Scott, and Dr. Tom Miller. It was also hosted by the team of Rich Landrum and Johnny Weaver. In 1978, JCP later added a short-lived show, The Best of NWA Wrestling, which was taped at the WCCB studios in Charlotte (across the street from the now-Bojangles' Coliseum, a regular venue for Mid-Atlantic live events) and featured then-active wrestler Johnny Weaver sitting down with top stars in a "coach's show" format (in which host and guest did running commentary over 16 millimeter film footage of matches from local arenas). Rich Landrum and David Crockett appeared on "Best Of", doing promo interviews for local arena shows.

Ted Turner, whose Atlanta television station WTCG would become distributed nationally via satellite starting in 1976, had realized the value of professional wrestling for cable television in the early 1970s. WTCG aired Georgia Championship Wrestling's programming on Saturday evenings, and wrestling provided his then-fledgling enterprise (the future SuperStation WTBS) a source of cheap live entertainment which was well-suited to the station's target demographics. Turner could run per inquiry advertisements (for products like Slim Whitman albums and Ginsu knives) and take part of the sales profits just by providing the big viewing audience delivered by pro wrestling's loyal fanbase (wrestling generally did not attract large ad revenues at that time, due to negative industry perceptions of its lower-income target demographic).

SuperStation TBS's parent company, Turner Broadcasting System, had asked Georgia Championship Wrestling to change its public brand name to World Championship Wrestling, helping fuel rumors that the Jim Barnett-controlled company would go national itself; GCW acquiesced to the World Championship Wrestling name change in 1982. Meanwhile, by 1983, JCP went from recording its weekly shows in a television studio to shooting on-location, in between matches at live arena events. After purchasing a mobile television production unit for $1 million, Crockett unveiled what became the NWA's dominant annual supercard, Starrcade.

In 1984, McMahon's WWF purchased controlling interest in GCW from a number of its co-owners (including Barnett and brothers Jack and Jerry Brisco), thus gaining control of GCW's flagship Saturday night time slot on TBS. This tactic—co-opting the time slots of rival territories in their own "backyard"/local TV markets—was part of the WWF's national expansion strategy. To McMahon's surprise, however, the move backfired with TBS. When the WWF aired its first show on TBS on July 14, replacing World Championship Wrestling, viewer backlash was severe, as the show's Southern fans were incensed to see their beloved stars suddenly replaced—without advance notice—by an "invading force" of wrestlers from "up North," an event that has since become known in pro wrestling lore as Black Saturday. In response to the ensuing deluge of complaints, TBS granted an upstart promotion called Championship Wrestling from Georgia (backed by holdout GCW shareholder and NWA member Fred Ward and former GCW wrestler/booker Ole Anderson) an early Saturday morning time slot so that the local stars could still be seen. Championship Wrestling from Georgia's television show (which had the same name as the promotion itself), along with that of Bill Watts's Mid-South Wrestling (to whom Turner had also granted a time slot), easily surpassed the ratings for the WWF broadcast, which only featured clips and wrestler promos instead of original matches. The steep decline in ratings for the Saturday evening WWF show, and viewers clamoring for GCW's return, began to make the WWF's move a money-losing one. Eventually, McMahon cut his losses and sold the time slot to Crockett for $1 million. Although this gave Crockett vital national exposure, it also allowed McMahon to finance his own marquee wrestling event, WrestleMania. This chain of events was critical in Turner's eventual decision to purchase JCP and form World Championship Wrestling (WCW) in 1988.

Crockett bought out Ole Anderson's Championship Wrestling from Georgia, on April 6, 1985, and was re-elected NWA President. This was to help counter the WWF, after it became America's dominant wrestling business in the wake of WrestleMania. Crockett then purchased both Saturday evening TBS time slots from Vince McMahon and filled the time slot with two hours of original programming filmed in Ted Turner's Atlanta studios. The programming aired under the World Championship Wrestling banner, which had been adopted by GCW before its demise. As a result of the success World Championship Wrestling now had from acquiring the Saturday night time slots, Crockett (along with JCP booker Dusty Rhodes) was able to establish an annual summer supercard, "The Great American Bash".

===== World Championship Wrestling (1988–1993) =====
In 2000, several potential buyers for WCW were rumored to show interest in the company. Ted Turner, however, did not hold influence over Time Warner before the final merger of AOL and Time Warner in 2001, and most offers were rejected. Eric Bischoff, working with Fusient Media Ventures, made a bid to acquire the company in January 2001 One of the primary backers in the WCW deal backed out after AOL Time Warner refused to allow WCW to continue airing on its networks, leaving Fusient to take that offer off the table while it attempted to bring a new deal around. In the meantime, Jamie Kellner was handed control over the Turner Broadcasting division, and deemed WCW, along with Turner Sports as a whole, to be out of line with its image and saying that it "would not be favorable enough to get the "right" advertisers to buy airtime" (even though Thunder was the highest-rated show on TBS at the time). As a result, WCW programming was cancelled on TBS and TNT. In the book NITRO: The Incredible Rise and Inevitable Collapse of Ted Turner's WCW by Guy Evans, it is said that a key condition in WCW's purchase deal with Fusient was that Fusient wanted control over time slots on TNT and TBS networks, regardless of whether these slots would show WCW programming or not. This influenced Kellner's decision to ultimately cancel WCW programming. WCW's losses were then written-off via purchase accounting; according to Evans: "in the post-merger environment, the new conglomerate was able to 'write down' money losing operations, essentially eliminating those losses because of their irrelevancy moving forward."

=== New York City and Washington, D.C. (1957–1961, 1971–1983) ===
The very first programming produced by Capitol Wrestling Corporation, the World Wide Wrestling Federation's immediate predecessor, was Heavyweight Wrestling. The show involved wrestlers of low card to main event status. Following an episode's final match, the ring announcers informed viewers about next week's matches. Most of the events were held in District of Columbia's National Arena. Ray Morgan did the commentary for the show and "Friendly" Bob Freed and "Smiling" Sam Morgan served as ring announcers. Usually the main events involved WWWF Champion Bruno Sammartino retaining his title. The show ended in the summer of 1970 and was replaced by All-Star Wrestling.

All-Star Wrestling was a WWF promotional show that featured enhancement matches and interviews that were designed to further featured talent. The show was taped at the Hamburg Fieldhouse in Hamburg, Pennsylvania. The show replaced Heavyweight Wrestling from Washington DC. All-Star Wrestling ran from October 2, 1971 through August 30, 1986, when it was replaced by the new program Wrestling Challenge. Challenge was the "B" show of the WWF's syndicated programming, behind Superstars. Typically, the show comprised matches with play-by-play from Vince McMahon, with occasional assistance from Lord Alfred Hayes and Pat Patterson; it was later hosted by Gorilla Monsoon and Jesse Ventura. From 1984 to 1986, the theme of All-Star Wrestling was David Bowie's "Modern Love".

Championship Wrestling is one of the original TV shows of the World Wrestling Federation. It included all the stars of the WWF, interviews and championship matches. The show lasted from 1972 until August 1986 and was the flagship of the WWF's programming until it was replaced by Superstars of Wrestling. In 1984, the show used "Thriller" by Michael Jackson as its opening theme. The host and announcer was Vince McMahon, often joined by a co-host.

WWF on MSG Network is a monthly television special that aired live from Madison Square Garden on the MSG Network from August 7, 1976, to March 16, 1997.

== 1993–2012 ==
The NWA's territories were reorganized following the withdrawal of World Championship Wrestling (WCW) and New Japan Pro-Wrestling (NJPW). As other territories left the organization, the NWA would discontinued its memberships in August 2012.

=== Promotional overview ===
In 2005 David Marquez, founded the NWA Pro Wrestling/Pro West, NWA Pro was the primary NWA territory of the West Coast, Japan, Mexico, Chile, and Australia, On May 13, 2007, NWA Executive Director Bob Trobich announced that the NWA will cut all ties with the primary NWA Territory at the time, TNA Wrestling vacating both NWA World Heavyweight Championship and the NWA World Tag Team Championship. Shortly after this, the Reclaiming the Glory tournament was announced to crown a new NWA Worlds Champion. Later that year NWA Pro announced that they would introduce a new TV Program witch would include taped Content from NWA Pro and other territories, on January 16, 2008, NWA Pro would introduce NWA Wrestling Showcase on Colors TV it would air from 2008-2010 before it was rebranded as NWA Championship Wrestling From Hollywood both were produced by Big Vision Entertainment and NWA Championship Wrestling From Hollywood was taped at Columbia Square Studios in Hollywood. After launching on KDOC-TV, the Galaxy Theater in Santa Ana became the promotion's home venue. On May 12, 2012, NWA Hollywood ran its first non-TV event in its history, with Scorpio Sky vs. Nick Madrid as it main event.

Perth's Explosive Pro Wrestling had a television series on Access 31 called EPW Monday Night Wrestling from 2008 to 2010. 2016 saw EPW start up its Vimeo channel, From the Vault, which now contains over 100 shows going back to 2003. EPW action can also be viewed worldwide on platforms such as Demand Progress, Highspots Wrestling Network, and Powerslam TV.

Cornelia, Georgia's NWA Wildside's weekly one-hour TV show aired nationally and was available to as much as 40% of the United States at its peak. In late 2004, Wildside was broadcast by The Wrestling Channel in the United Kingdom giving them a transatlantic audience.

On August 9, 2009, at New England Championship Wrestling's 9th anniversary show, NECW announced that starting on January 8, 2010, NECW matches will air from 4pm to 5pm on Fridays on Comcast SportsNet New England. That makes NECW the first pro-wrestling promotion on CSNNE since the channel (then Fox Sports Net New England) aired TNA Impact! from 2004 to 2005. NECW was to tape the debut broadcast for CSNNE on December 19, 2009, in Quincy, Massachusetts, but postponed the taping due to inclement weather. The first 4 episodes were posted on NECW's website after technical issues forced the show's debut on CSNNE to be delayed until February 2010. On February 20, 2013, New England Championship Wrestling announced plans to make their broadcast television debut on local station WMFP in approximately 2.3 million homes throughout the Greater Boston, Metro west, Blackstone Valley area as well as north into southern New Hampshire and the southernmost tip of Maine. Their 30-minute program began airing on the station Thursday nights at 12:30 a.m. starting April 4, 2013.

Ohio Valley Wrestling's television programming originates from the Davis Arena in the Buechel neighborhood of Louisville. Their weekly series, known informally as OVW TV, currently airs locally on WBNA-21 and is streaming online via FITE TV. As of 2020, through various syndication and distribution deals, OVW's weekly series is seen in over 100 million households in the U.S., and over 700 million worldwide.

Pro Wrestling eXpress out of McKeesport, Pennsylvania, had a weekly late-night television show that aired on WPTT. In February 2013, Channel 22 began broadcasting PWX Steel City TV on Saturday mornings. The promotion originally had a late-night television show on WPTT during the late 1990s but had been off local television during the previous decade. PWX Steel City TV was syndicated to Channel 26 in mid-Mon Valley and Channel 56 in Westmoreland County reaching a potential audience of 400,000 viewers. Live shows were filmed at "The New PWX Wrestleplex" using a four-camera setup and a green screen for special features. PXW programming was shown in Western Pennsylvania and parts of Ohio and West Virginia on a total of 12 over-the-air television stations. As of 2015, it is also available online via Roku and Vimeo.

In April 2015, Ring Warriors held a 6-hour TV taping at the WPBT studios. The company planned to broadcast the show in India, Singapore and Thailand. On August 15, 2015, Ring Warriors announced an TV Taping deal at Tampa Letter Carriers Hall in Tampa, Florida. On July 23, 2018, Ring Warriors announced on Facebook a national television partnership with WGN America. Ring Warriors would debut on the network starting September 15, 2018. In December 2018, it was announced that episodes of Ring Warriors would begin streaming on Amazon Prime Video, starting with the show's "Winter Finale" on December 22, 2018. Ring Warriors ceased operations after the season finale on December 22, 2018.

NWA Shockwave out of Staten Island was known for its early use of the internet to promote itself, and was the earliest known wrestling organization to broadcast its events on a regular webcast; their show, "Shockwave TV", aired on ITV until 2005.

The first events and TV tapings for Smokey Mountain Wrestling were held in October and November 1991. Matches from these shows were first shown in February 1992. Bob Caudle, who was the play-by-play announcer on the TV program, would also proclaim at the beginning of each show that Smoky Mountain Wrestling was "professional wrestling the way it used to be, and the way you like it." Though the promotion was highly thought of, it struggled to get a profitable television deal, and operated throughout a wrestling recession that would not end until the second half of 1996. After years of operating in red ink, and the loss of financial backing from Rubin, Jim Cornette shut the promotion down in December 1995 to work full-time with the WWF. The last SMW show was held on November 26, 1995, in Cookeville, Tennessee (though it had been announced on SMW TV's November 25, 1995, episode that upcoming shows were to be held at the Collett Street Rec Center in Morganton, North Carolina on December 1, 1995, and at Cloudland High School in Roan Mountain, Tennessee the following night), and featured the entire SMW roster attacking Jim Cornette, who was then pinned by referee Mark Curtis.

In 2007, Salt Lake City's Ultra Championship Wrestling-Zero left AWA Superstars to join the National Wrestling Alliance and began co-promoting shows with NWA Pro. By 2008, UCW-Zero was an official affiliate of the National Wrestling Alliance. Martin Casaus, Cassidy, Kahn Kussion, Dallas Murdoch, and Derrick Jannetty all made appearances for the NWA during the NWA TV tapings in Las Vegas and later in Hollywood. During one of these tapings, Cassidy competed against current World Champion Daniel Bryan. Martin Casaus was a routine competitor on the NWA television show, taking on Lance Cade and Trevor Murdoch, Kahn Kussion, and TJ Perkins.

The West Coast Wrestling Connection on KPDX out of Portland, Oregon debuted on May 24, 2014. The promotion shoots a live TV taping, typically the first Saturday of each month. These tapings were originally held at the Bob White Theatre in Southeast Portland, but have since relocated to the Jackson Armory. The television broadcasts team consists of Jeff Akin on play-by-play and Morty Lipschitz on color commentary.

==== NWA Total Nonstop Action Wrestling (2002–2007) ====
The concept of TNA originated shortly after World Championship Wrestling (WCW) ended in 2001, with the World Wrestling Federation (WWF, later WWE) gaining a monopoly on the industry. While on a fishing trip, Bob Ryder, Jeff Jarrett and Jerry Jarrett contemplated their futures in the professional wrestling business. Ryder suggested a company not reliant on television, but rather one going straight to pay-per-view. In July 2002, Vince Russo joined Jeff and Jerry Jarrett's NWA-TNA promotion as a creative writer and would assist in the writing and production of the shows. Russo states that he coined the name "Total Nonstop Action", the initials of the company "TNA" being a play on "T&A". The original intention, as they were exclusive to pay-per-view, was to be viewed as an edgier product than WWE.

Initially, TNA's weekly pay-per-view show operated as the company's main source of revenue, in place of monthly pay-per-view events used by other promotions. These shows took place mostly at the Tennessee State Fairground Sports Arena in Nashville, Tennessee, nicknamed the "TNA Asylum". Xplosion launched on November 27, 2002, as TNA's first regular cable show and featured exclusive matches taped at the TNA Asylum as well as exclusive interviews with TNA wrestlers. The last weekly pay-per-view took place on September 8, 2004.

In May 2004, TNA introduced its second weekly television program, Impact! (stylized as iMPACT!), produced at Soundstage 21, nicknamed the "Impact Zone", at Universal Studios Florida and broadcast on Fox Sports Net. With the show's premiere, TNA introduced a six-sided wrestling ring, the implementation of the "Fox Box" displaying competitors and timekeeping for the match and a generally more sports-like style than the sports entertainment style exemplified by WWE.

Later that year, TNA would later secure a television deal with Spike TV; Impact! debuted on the network on October 1, 2005. The episode saw Team 3D make their TNA debut.

== 2012–2017 ==
Beginning in August 2012, promotions paid to license the NWA brand. This arrangement ended October 2017, when the NWA was acquired by Lightning One, Inc.

=== Promotional overview ===
In 2004, Championship Wrestling Alliance's Championship Wrestling TV began airing locally on WCYB-DT2 and was later syndicated nationally on AMG-TV. It held weekly television tapings at the National Guard Armory in Morristown, Tennessee as well as house shows throughout East Tennessee. The promotion joined the National Wrestling Alliance as NWA Smoky Mountain Wrestling in early-2011. The announcement was made by CWA Commissioner Robbie Cassidy on the March 13th TV taping of Championship Wrestling TV in Gray, Tennessee. On April 6, 2013, what was now known as NWA Smoky Mountain drew its biggest crowd to date with 2,017 fans attending a NWA Smoky Mountain TV television taping at Elizabethton High School. In October 2013, Givens attempted to raise $15,000 on Kickstarter.com to improve the production values for NWA Smoky Mountain TV. The appeal raised only $1,485 before the 60-day deadline. The show became available on YouTube the following year.

NWA Southern All-Star Wrestling began broadcasting exclusively on cable on Comcast Cable channel 49 on Saturday nights at midnight. Then in 2009, SAW moved to Nashville's WNAB, broadcasting on Saturday nights at 8:00 p.m., and also began to be syndicated throughout the country. In 2010, SAW moved to 9:00 p.m., then in 2011 moved to 10:00 p.m. In 2012, SAW Moved to Sundays at 10:00 p.m., then in 2013 moved to 11:00 p.m., then moved to early Sunday mornings at 2:00 a.m. beginning in 2014. In the fall of 2015, SAW left WNAB, and was broadcast on internet only, until 2016 when SAW returned to television, and made its return to Comcast Cable channel 49 on Saturday nights at midnight.

== Since 2017 ==
As previously mentioned, in August 2012, the NWA discontinued its memberships and started licensing its brand to wrestling promotions. By 2019, the NWA would transition to become a singular promotion.

Powerrr is the flagship program of the NWA that currently airs Tuesdays at 6:05 pm ET on the official NWA account on X. The series debuted on October 8, 2019, originally airing on the NWA's YouTube channel. From 2021 to the end of 2022, the show had a first airing on Tuesday at 6:05 pm ET on FITE TV, with the episode debuting on the NWA's YouTube channel later in the same week in Friday at 6:05 pm ET. Between February and September 2024 Powerrr aired on the CW app.

A companion series, titled Power Surge (stylized as NWA Powerrr Surge), premiered on April 13, 2021 and features wrestler interviews, unseen matches, and Power recaps.
