= Fred Kohler (wrestling promoter) =

American wrestling promoter

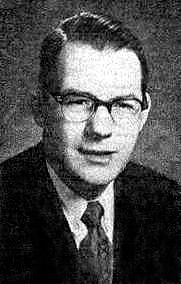

Frederick Koch (January 6, 1903 – August 24, 1969), known professionally as Fred Kohler, was an American professional wrestling promoter. The owner of Fred Kohler Enterprises, Kohler produced the popular DuMont Television Network program Wrestling From Marigold (1949–1955). Kohler promoted matches in Chicago, Illinois for close to 40 years and was responsible for such talents as Verne Gagne and promoter Jim Barnett. He was also president of the National Wrestling Alliance from 1961 to 1962.

== Early life ==
Kohler was born in Chicago on January 6, 1903 along with his twin sister Mildred to German immigrants Fritz and Katie Koch. Fritz owned Koch's Hall, a social club on Chicago's North Side. Young Fred was exposed to wrestling at Koch's Hall and is said to have promoted his earliest matches there. After graduating from Lane Tech high school, where he was captain of the school football team, he worked for a time at the local YMCA and as a die machinist. He kept the machinist job until well after he was established as a promoter.

Kohler had wrestled as a young man, during which time he was given the pseudonym Fred Kohler by an Iowa promoter, possibly after an actor of the same name. He ran in opposition to local promoters Joe Coffey and Ed White, using wrestlers supplied by Billy Sandow and Al Haft. Thanks in part to a successful card staged at Chicago Stadium in 1936 in which Ali Baba met Everette Marshall for a world heavyweight championship, Kohler became the main promoter in Chicago. When Coffey died in 1941, and White retired the next year, Kohler was ruler of all Chicago wrestling.

== Television and the NWA ==
Wrestling cards from the Rainbow Arena were first telecast on Wednesday nights by WBKB (now WBBM-TV) in July 1946, after overcoming some early technical problems, the show was popular enough to warrant a second series originating from the Midway Arena on Monday nights. Kohler was one of the first men in the business to recognize the positive effects of TV on wrestling attendance, and when WGN-TV went on the air in 1949, a deal was made to broadcast Saturday night cards from the Marigold Gardens arena. It would be this show, as Wrestling From Marigold, that would receive national attention on the DuMont Network.

Kohler had been invited to the formation of the National Wrestling Alliance in Iowa in 1948, and while he could not attend that initial meeting, he did agree to its rules and became a member. However, his time in the NWA was difficult, largely due to personal and professional differences with members, including longtime NWA president and St. Louis promoter Sam Muchnick. Kohler resigned in late 1950 over a dispute with the Rainbow Arena's owner securing rights to promote NWA matches (Kohler had left the Rainbow in a rent dispute) but returned in 1951. He overcame an invasion from Montreal promoter Eddie Quinn who'd secured deals with WBBM-TV and Chicago Stadium owners Arthur M. Wirtz and James D. Norris from 1959 to 1960. And when illness forced Muchnick to step down as NWA president in 1961, Kohler was elected president and spent a year in office.

== Last days ==
Kohler saw a decline in business by 1963. The DuMont program had left the air in 1955, WGN had stopped its broadcasts from the Marigold in 1957, indeed the Marigold itself had been sold to a non-denominational church. Kohler cut a deal with Vincent J. McMahon, whose Capitol Wrestling had seceded from the NWA, for talent and TV tapes. As a result, Kohler left the NWA that year. In 1964, he sold part of the promotion to Dick the Bruiser and Wilbur Snyder, who were running wrestling in Indianapolis. The next year, Bruiser, Snyder and Verne Gagne bought out Kohler entirely.

Fred Kohler spent his last few years running a machinery business in suburban Chicago before moving to Arizona, where he died on August 24, 1969. He was survived by his wife, Jacqueline and his four daughters, Patricia, Betty, Kathleen and Susan.

== Accomplishments ==
- Wrestling Observer Newsletter
  - Wrestling Observer Newsletter Hall of Fame (1996)

== See also ==
- List of professional wrestling promoters

Preceded by Frank Tunney	President of the National Wrestling Alliance; 1961–1962	Succeeded by Karl Sarpolis
