= Harry Light =

French/American wrestling promoter (1898-1971)

- Born: Harold Lecht; September 17, 1898; Paris, France
- Died: October 29, 1971 (aged 73); Detroit, Michigan, U.S.
- Occupation: Promoter
- Years active: 1929–1959
- Organization: Harry Light Wrestling Office
- Military career
- Allegiance: Canada
- Branch: Royal Canadian Navy
- Service years: 1916-1918
- Conflicts: World War I

Harold Lecht, known professionally as Harry Light (September 17, 1898 - October 29, 1971) was a French/American professional wrestling promoter. He is best known for running the Harry Light Wrestling Office in Detroit, Michigan from 1945 to 1959. He was one of the six founders of the National Wrestling Alliance, the body that dominated professional wrestling in North America for much of the latter half of the twentieth century.

== Early life ==
Light was born in Paris, France, in 1898. He was brought to the United States at the age of one and raised in New York. When he was 14, his family relocated to Montreal, Quebec, in Canada. Light enlisted in the Royal Canadian Navy at the age of 17, serving in World War I. Following the Armistice of 11 November 1918, Light became a professional boxer, fighting approximately 60 bouts under the ring name "Kid Yank" as a featherweight. In 1919, Light returned to the United States, working in Detroit, Michigan, as an usher.

== Promoting career ==
After a chance encounter with Adam Weissmuller, the promoter of Detroit's Arena Gardens, Light began working for Weissmuller Wrestling Enterprises. He initially worked as an usher and cashier, eventually becoming Weissmuller's protégé. After Weissmuller died in 1937, Light began working as an assistant to his successor, Louis Markowitz.

Light began promoting in his own right in 1939. Following World War II, Light secured the rights to promote events at the Arena Gardens. The Harry Light Wrestling Office began staging professional wrestling shows under the banner "Big Time Wrestling". Light's right hand men were Jack Britton, a road agent, and Bert Ruby, a booker and trainer.

In 1947, Light began airing Big Time Wrestling on Channel 7, giving him a major advantage over other promoters active in Detroit. In 1948, Light reported that the television product had enabled him to increase attendance while reducing advertising costs by 60%.

In 1948, Light founded the National Wrestling Alliance along with Al Haft, Orville Brown, Paul "Pinkie" George, Sam Muchnick, and Tony Stecher. The six promoters agreed to divide the United States into regional territories within which they would not compete with one another and to recognise a single NWA World Heavyweight Champion who would travel the country wrestling in each territory. By the 1950s, Light effectively controlled professional wrestling in Detroit and Big Time Wrestling was one of the most popular programs airing in Detroit.

As part of the NWA, Light and his colleagues were responsible for coordinating the booking of midget professional wrestlers by NWA members. Their role included training rookie wrestlers and blacklisting wrestlers who failed to fulfill their commitments.

In the mid-1950s, Ruby broke away from Light to found the outlaw promotion Wolverine Wrestling, weakening Light's promotion. This left Light vulnerable in an ensuing promotional war with Jim Barnett and Johnny Doyle, who began staging professional wrestling events in the Cobo Arena in opposition to Light in 1959. After a short rivalry, Light stepped away from promoting, leaving the Barnett-Doyle Corporation in control of professional wrestling in Detroit.

== Personal life ==
Light had six children: five sons and a daughter.

== Death ==
Light died on October 29, 1971, at the age of 73 in Detroit.

== See also ==
- Big Time Wrestling
