= Bert Ruby =

Hungarian-American professional wrestler (1910 – 1968)

Personal information
- Born: Bertalan Rubinstein; November 29, 1910 Valea lui Mihai, Transylvania, Austria-Hungary
- Died: March 9, 1968 (aged 57) Michigan, U.S.
- Cause of death: Heart attack
- Spouse: Irene
- Children: 2

Professional wrestling career
- Ring name(s): Bert Rubi; Bert Rubinstein; Bert Ruby; Magyar Hercules
- Billed height: 5 ft 9 in (175 cm)
- Billed weight: 190 lb (86 kg)
- Billed from: Hungary
- Debut: 1933
- Retired: 1955

Bert Ruby (born Bertalan Rubinstein, November 29, 1910 - March 9, 1968) was a Hungarian/American professional wrestler, professional wrestling trainer, and wrestling promoter.

== Early life ==
Rubinstein was born in the village of Valea lui Mihai in the Transylvania region of Austria-Hungary in 1910, one of 12 children. Following the dissolution of Austria-Hungary in 1919, Rubinstein lived in Hungary. As a young man, he became known for his greater strength and was reputed to be "the town's toughest Jew". During the Great Depression, he emigrated from Hungary to Toronto, Ontario, Canada on an agricultural worker's permit, working on farms. He broke into professional wrestling in the 1930s after a filling station owner hired him and several other local young men to put on a wrestling card and he was spotted by a promoter, eventually moving to Detroit, Michigan in the United States to pursue a career in professional wrestling.

== Professional wrestling career ==
Ruby wrestled his first recorded match in 1933.

Ruby wrestled barefoot for much of his career, earning him the nickname "The Man With the Educated Toes". He used the ring names "Bert Ruby", "Bert Rubi", and "Magyar Hercules" ("Hungarian Hercules").

Ruby both ran and wrestled for the Michigan-based promotion Wolverine Wrestling. He held the promotion's Michigan Junior Heavyweight Championship in 1950 and again in 1951.

Ruby retired in 1955 after suffering a heart attack during a bout. He went on to promote professional wrestling in Michigan. He was the right-hand man of Harry Light, helping run the Harry Light Wrestling Office, which dominated professional wrestling in Detroit from the 1940s to the 1960s. As a promoter, Ruby introduced wrestlers including Abdullah the Butcher, George Steele, Killer Kowalski, Leaping Larry Chene, and The Sheik. Ruby was also responsible for booking midget professional wrestlers on behalf of the National Wrestling Alliance, with promoters from the various NWA territories contacting him to hire popular wrestlers such as Little Beaver, Little Brutus, and Sky Low Low.

== Personal life ==
Ruby and his wife, Irene, had two sons, Allen and Rob, both of whom became prominent lawyers in the San Francisco Bay Area. Irene was the bookkeeper for Ruby's promotion while his sons worked as announcers, with Allen himself wrestling for over two years. In 1948, Ruby and his wife adopted his nephew, Emery Grosinger, an orphaned teenage Holocaust survivor.

Ruby was Jewish. Following his relocation to North America he anglicized his name as Bert Ruby.

== Death ==
Ruby died of a heart attack in 1967 at the age of 57.

== Championships and accomplishments ==
- Michigan Jewish Sports Hall of Fame
  - Class of 2006
- Wolverine Wrestling
  - Michigan Junior Heavyweight Championship (2 times)

== See also ==
- Big Time Wrestling
- List of Jewish professional wrestlers
