= Larry Chene =

American wrestler (1924–1964)

Personal information
- Born: Arthur Lawrence Beauchene; June 22, 1924 Detroit, Michigan, U.S.
- Died: October 2, 1964 (aged 40) Ottawa, Illinois, U.S.

Professional wrestling career
- Billed height: 5'10
- Billed weight: 224 lb (102 kg)
- Trained by: Bert Ruby
- Debut: 1950

Arthur Lawrence Beauchene (June 22, 1924 – October 2, 1964) was an American professional wrestler who mainly worked in Detroit during most of his career.

== Professional wrestling career ==
Born in Detroit to French and Italian parents. Chene took up amateur wrestling in high school and continued the sport in college. He joined the air force in 1945. In 1950, Chene made his professional wrestling debut when he was trained and recruited by Detroit promoter Bert Ruby. Chene started his career out in the Michigan-Indiana-Ohio territory, western and southern Ontario. In 1954, Chene left Detroit and went to Texas winning the Texas Junior Heavyweight Championship where he defeated Billy Raborn. He also spent time in many territories including Hawaii, Pacific Northwest and Chicago.

He was also called, "Leaping Larry Chene."

In 1960, Chene returned to his hometown Detroit where he became a fan favorite feuding with The Sheik Farhat and Dick the Bruiser. One night in September 1960 against Dick the Bruiser 15,00 fans showed up at the Olympia and lots of bloods between both wrestlers.

Chene won the IWA United States Heavyweight Championship from Pat O'Connor on January 8, 1963. He dropped the title to the Great Mephisto on May 16 and regained the title back from Mephisto on November 11, 1963. Eventually Chene dropped the title to Pat O'Connor on August 26, 1964.

After losing title, Chene made his debut in Minneapolis, Minnesota for American Wrestling Association (AWA). His last match was on October 1, 1964, against Larry Hennig in a losing effort.

== Death ==
On October 2, 1964, Chene was killed in a single vehicle accident in Ottawa, Illinois when his car flipped over by hitting a telephone pole. Police said that it was speeding as they found a speeding ticket in his car which Chene got earlier that day. He was 40 years old. Chene was buried in Detroit's Mount Olivet Cemetery on October 6.

Nearly 60 years after his death a book was released on February 4, 2022, by G.J. Rowell.

== Championships and accomplishments ==
- Big Time Wrestling (Texas)
  - Texas Junior Heavyweight Championship (4 times)
      - NWA Texas Tag Team Championship (1 time) - with Pepper Gomez
- Pacific Northwest Wrestling
  - NWA Pacific Northwest Tag Team Championship (1 time) with Herb Freeman
