= Tony Stecher =

American professional wrestler, promoter and trainer (1889-1954)

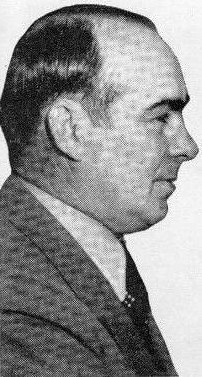
- Stecher in 1947
- Born: Anton Charles Stecher; February 7, 1889; Dodge, Nebraska, U.S.
- Died: October 10, 1954 (aged 65); Minneapolis, Minnesota, U.S.
- Occupations: Sports promoter, professional wrestler
- Known for: Professional wrestling, trainer of Joe Stecher, co-founder of the National Wrestling Alliance, boxing and professional wrestling promoter

Anton Charles Stecher (February 7, 1889 – October 10, 1954) was an American professional wrestler, professional wrestling and boxing promoter and trainer. He was the booker and trainer for his brother, World Heavyweight Wrestling Champion Joe Stecher, and later was America's top wrestling promoter. In 1948, Stecher was one of five promoters to back Paul "Pinkie" George in the formation of the National Wrestling Alliance.

In boxing, he was a prominent promoter in the sport, particularly from 1944–1954, and is credited with reviving boxing in Minnesota during the 1940s. He is a member of the Minnesota Boxing Hall of Fame (Class of 2013) and the Wrestling Observer Newsletter Hall of Fame (Class of 1996)

== Early life ==
Anton Stecher was born on February 7, 1889, on a farm just outside Dodge, Nebraska. "Tony" had a substandard education and worked as a farmhand from a young age. His younger brother Joe was born on April 4, 1893. In January 1912, Tony and Joe visited nearby Fremont, Nebraska, to see famed wrestler Ben Roller. As he often did, Roller challenged all comers on the mat and both Tony and Joe took him up on the challenge. Roller tossed both but was impressed by Joe's natural talent. Following a disagreement with their father about them becoming professional wrestlers instead of farmers, Joe and Tony ran away from home, hitchhiking to Fremont where they joined the local YMCA and began honing their skills in wrestling

== In-ring wrestling career ==
Stecher would soon turn pro in wrestling and competed throughout the Central States against wrestlers such as Frank Coleman and John Solomon. In 1914, he was wrestling as the Middleweight Champion of Nebraska and on October 15 of the same year he defeated Tom Doctor in Dodge to also become Kansas State Middleweight Champion. On April 22, 1914, he competed in a 5 hour, 18 minute bout against Wesley Cobb in Stuart, Nebraska.

== Booking for Joe Stecher ==
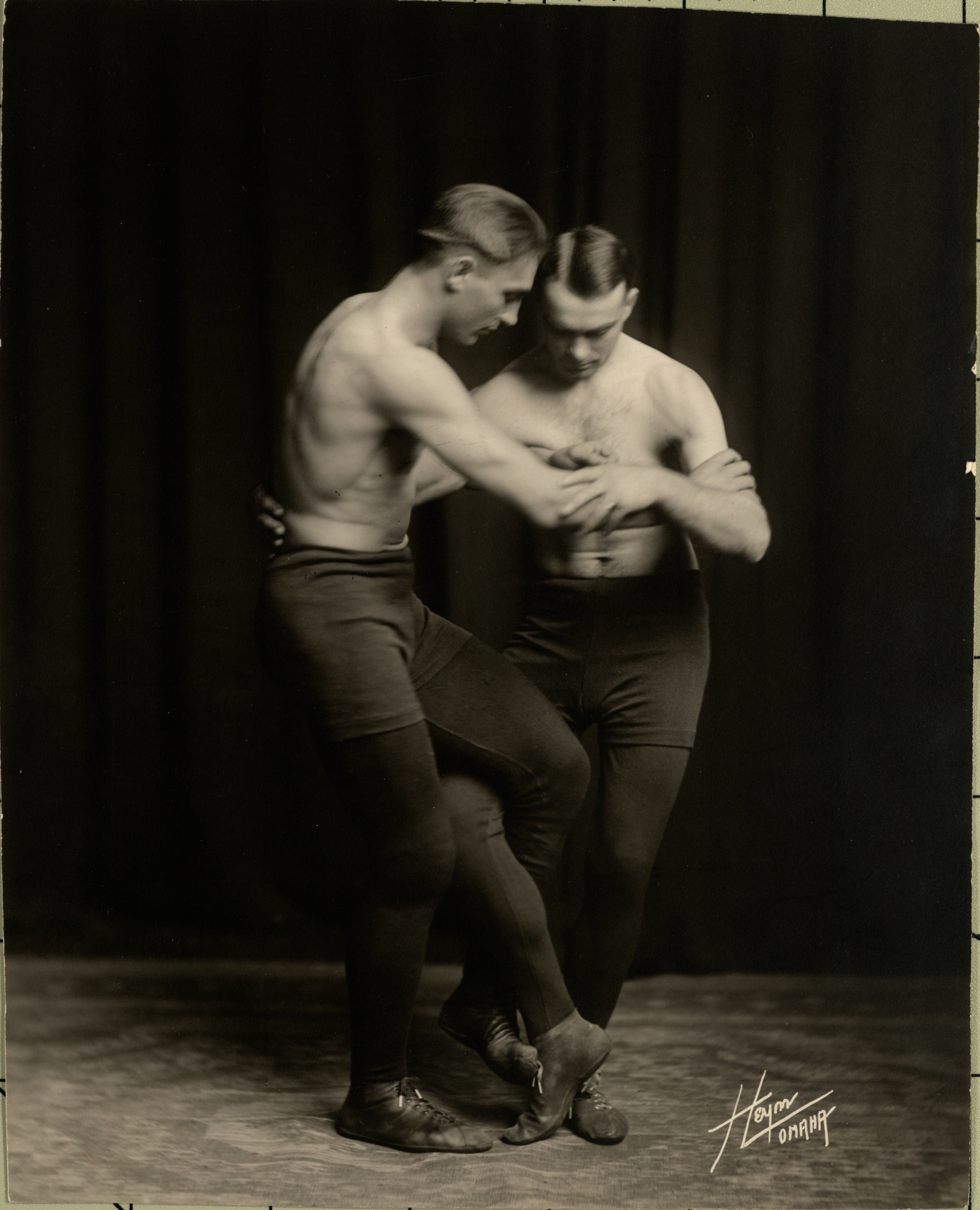
Joe and Tony Stecher (1916)

Stecher went on to have memorable rivalries with the likes of Clarence Eklund but his work as promoter and booker for his brother Joe (whom he also trained) soon became his main focus. The undefeated Joe achieved unparalleled success but battled demons throughout his career and needed Tony to protect him against unscrupulous promoters. With his matches managed by Tony, Joe became one of wrestling's biggest stars. As brothers they were very close and travelled throughout the United States together, with Tony brokering scores of bouts from 1917 to 1934. After capturing numerous World Heavyweight Championships, at 43 years of age and after some business setbacks, Joe was hospitalised after suffered a breakdown. Tony arranged for him to be moved to a hospital in St. Cloud, Minnesota where he attended to his brother until his own passing.

== Promoter and booker ==
Independently wealthy from his decades in the wrestling business, Stecher began a wrestling office as a promoter in Minneapolis. He was taken by the city after a trip in the early 1930s and relocated his family from Nebraska to Minnesota in 1933. His first program was on February 21, 1933, with the wrestling debut of football star Bronko Nagurski. Stecher achieved great success and became the nation's top wrestling promoter. He formed business relationships with various promoters in neighbouring states and aided an upstart Sam Muchnick in created his territory in St. Louis, sending him wrestlers to help the outfit grow.

Stecher's career in the boxing business continued alongside his wrestling tenure. He was the exclusive promoter recognised by the Minnesota Boxing Commission and was a prominent figure in the sport from 1944-1954. He put on scores of bouts with boxing stars such as Jackie Graves, Rocky Graziano, Willie Pep, Beau Jack and Sandy Saddler. He joined Maxwell Clayton and Pinkie George to form an innovative working arrangement to bring top-level boxing fights to the American Heartland. Other promoters joined the successful collaboration, and soon thereafter a similar professional wrestling agreement was made. Pinkie George organised a symposium in Waterloo, Iowa with regional promoters, including Stecher, at which the National Wrestling Alliance was formulated.

== Later life and career ==
Stecher continued to play a pivotal role in the ongoing success of the National Wrestling Alliance and professional wrestling in his territory. He was thought of as a generous and fair man by wrestlers and his "kindness was renowned". In boxing, Stecher is credited with reviving boxing in Minnesota and set records for both attendance and gates for boxing

== Death ==
Stecher died of a heart attack on October 10, 1954, having felt unwell the night before. His death was national news and his funeral was attended by sports figures such as Joe Louis and Jack Dempsey. A bronze plaque was made for Stecher which now is displayed at the Dodge County Historical Society

== Championships and accomplishments ==
=== Professional wrestling ===
- Wrestling Observer Newsletter
  - Wrestling Observer Newsletter Hall of Fame (Class of 1996)
  - Nebraska Middleweight Champion
  - Kansas State Middleweight Champion

=== Boxing ===
- Minnesota Boxing Hall of Fame
  - Class of 2013
