= Al Haft =

American wrestler

- Born: Albert C. Haft; November 13, 1886; United States
- Died: November 10, 1976 (aged 89)
- Other name: Young Gotch
- Occupations: Wrestler, trainer, promoter
- Known for: Wrestling promoter and founding member of the National Wrestling Alliance

Albert C. Haft (November 13, 1886 – 10 November 1976) was a wrestler (both professional and amateur), wrestling coach, and wrestling and boxing promoter, booker and trainer. He was a prominent promoter in the United States from the late 1910s until the 1960s, running his operations primarily from Columbus, Ohio. He founded the Midwest Wrestling Association and was one of the founding members of the National Wrestling Alliance in 1948. Haft was originally the manager and booker of John Pesek, who became World Heavyweight Champion.

== Early life, family and education ==
Haft was the son of Albert and Carrie Haft and from Buffalo, New York, although he was reportedly born in Canton, Ohio. He enlisted in the US Army in 1918 and received an infantry; he served for less than a year.

== Career ==
=== Professional wrestling in-ring career (1917–19) ===
In his early life, Haft was an in-ring competitor in professional wrestling, entering the ring in 1917 and competing under the ring name Young Gotch. He competed sporadically until 1932 but his full-time focus as an in-ring performer was short-lived, deciding instead to focus on his growing success as a promoter.

=== Ohio State University coach ===
He was also involved in amateur wrestling. He was the first head wrestling coach at the Ohio State University, starting in 1921. During his second year as head coach, the team's record was 3–3–0. His Buckeyes captured their first team title in 1923, with an 8–0 record. He stopped coaching in 1930.

=== The Midwest Wrestling Association and John Pesek (1920s and 1930s) ===
Haft began wrestling promoting in 1919. His interest in joining the professional ranks was sparked after he met John Pesek, a fellow wrestler who Haft considered the best in the world. Haft became Pesek's manager and brokered deals for him throughout the US and abroad. In 1929, Haft sent Pesek for a wrestling tour of Australia where he came out victorious. He returned to the States a star and soon entered the discussion of World Heavyweight Championship contenders. With Haft by his side, Pesek became the World Heavyweight Champion.

In 1931, Haft created the Midwest Wrestling Association and booked a match pitting Pesek against Joe Stecher to crown the initial champion. The bout was backed by the Ohio State Athletic Commission. Pesek beat Stecher and Haft’s working relationship with Kansas and Missouri territories expanded Pesek’s star power and booking potential. Haft named a racing horse of his John Pesek.

=== Haft's Acre ===
In 1927, Haft opened Haft's Acre, an outdoor arena, at the southwest corner of Park Street and Goodale Boulevard in Columbus. Boxing and wrestling were staged there until the early 1960s. Wrestlers such as Gorgeous George, Nature Boy Buddy Rogers and Wild Bull Curry competed at the Haft events. Haft later owned an arena in nearby Reynoldsburg, Ohio.

=== National Wrestling Alliance ===
In 1948, Haft joined other prominent wrestling promoters (Pinkie George, Tony Stecher, Max "Squire" Clayton, George Simpson, Harry Light, and Sam Muchnick) as a charter member of the National Wrestling Alliance. Pinkie George was its first president, and Haft was elected vice-president. The newly formed outfit was to operate talent exchanges, establish a territorial system and recognise one world champion per weight class. The NWA soon grew to become the largest body in professional wrestling, with recognised territories throughout the US, Canada, Mexico and Japan.

Haft's MWA World Heavyweight Champion Orville Brown defeated Otto Kuss in a match soon thereafter and was crowned the inaugural NWA World Heavyweight Champion, merging the MWA with the NWA. Towards the end of November 1949, Brown suffered injuries in an automobile accident and the promoters of the NWA met in St. Louis to recognize Lou Thesz as the World Heavyweight Champion. During this, George and Haft were also re-elected to their positions of president and vice-president. The organization remained the largest governing body in the sport until the mid-1980s national expansion of Vince McMahon's World Wrestling Federation. By that time, Haft had long since retired from the business.

=== Additional ventures ===
Haft owned many properties, both within Columbus and in nearby areas. He owned a compound at East Main Street and Hentz Road in Reynoldsburg, Ohio, that featured a wrestling arena but also included a restaurant and motel.

== Personal life ==
Haft and his wife lived in Reynoldsburg, Ohio, in the greater Columbus metro area. He owned and raced at least one horse in the 1930s.
