= Wild Bull Miller =

American professional wrestler

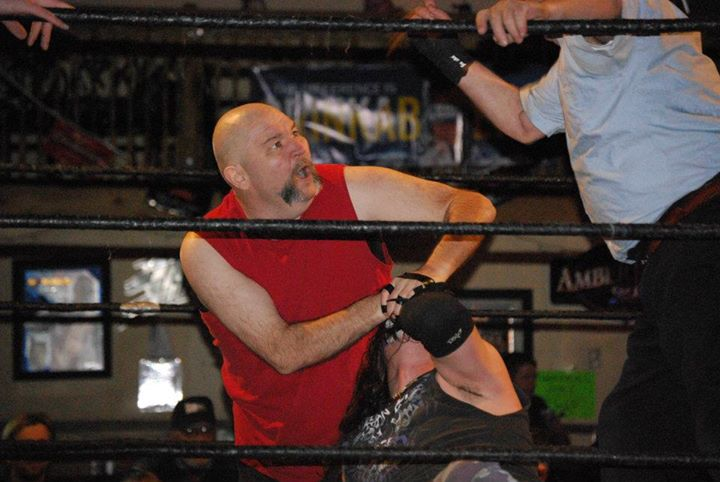
Wild Bull Miller at an I.W.A. event

Tom Miller (1962–2018) better known by his ring name Wild Bull Miller, was an American professional wrestler.

Miller started wrestling at age 14 while in junior high school. He successfully competed as an amateur until he graduated High School in 1981. He tracked down former WWF star, Flying Fred Curry, before graduating. Fred, along with his father, Wild Bull Curry, and former wrestler, Bobby Pico, trained Miller to become a professional.

Miller started wrestling professionally in late 1981 as Aaron Lee Star. His first match was in Circleville, Ohio, for the now defunct NAWA. That show actually resulted in a riot as several fans were not happy with the fact many of the star wrestlers advertised were not there.

As Aaron Star, he was featured in matches that aired on Superstation WTBS, losing to more seasoned wrestlers such as Wildfire Tommy Rich and Brad Armstrong

Upon the death of his trainer, Bull Curry, in 1985, Miller took the name Wild Bull in his honor. Throughout the 80's and 90's, he wrestled for a host of Ohio-based promotions as well as the Indiana-based World Wrestling Association (Dick the Bruiser's promotion) and the Detroit Michigan's NWA affiliate (ran by the Original Sheik).

In 1988 he started the International Wrestling Alliance (IWA), based out of Columbus Ohio. The IWA sponsored events mainly through Ohio, including fundraisers featuring Demolition Ax, Leaping Lanny Poffo, and members of The Road Warriors. The IWA remains Ohio's longest running pro wrestling organization.

He started running a pro wrestling school in the late 1990s and trained close to one hundred wrestlers over a ten-year period. Many of these wrestlers wrestled for the IWA promotion as well as several other federations. He closed down the original school in 2004 but still continued to train aspiring wrestlers. For a brief time, the IWA Training school held classes for "Junior" wrestlers. An IWA show once even featured wrestlers from the junior league that featured such talents as Wesley the Detroit real deal Willis, Justin Sane, and others.

Besides wrestling, promoting wrestling shows, and training wrestling hopefuls, Miller also produced several pro wrestling television shows. Miller also ran a toll-free professional wrestling hotline in the mid 1990s.
