= Jim Barnett (wrestling) =

American wrestling promoter (1924–2004)

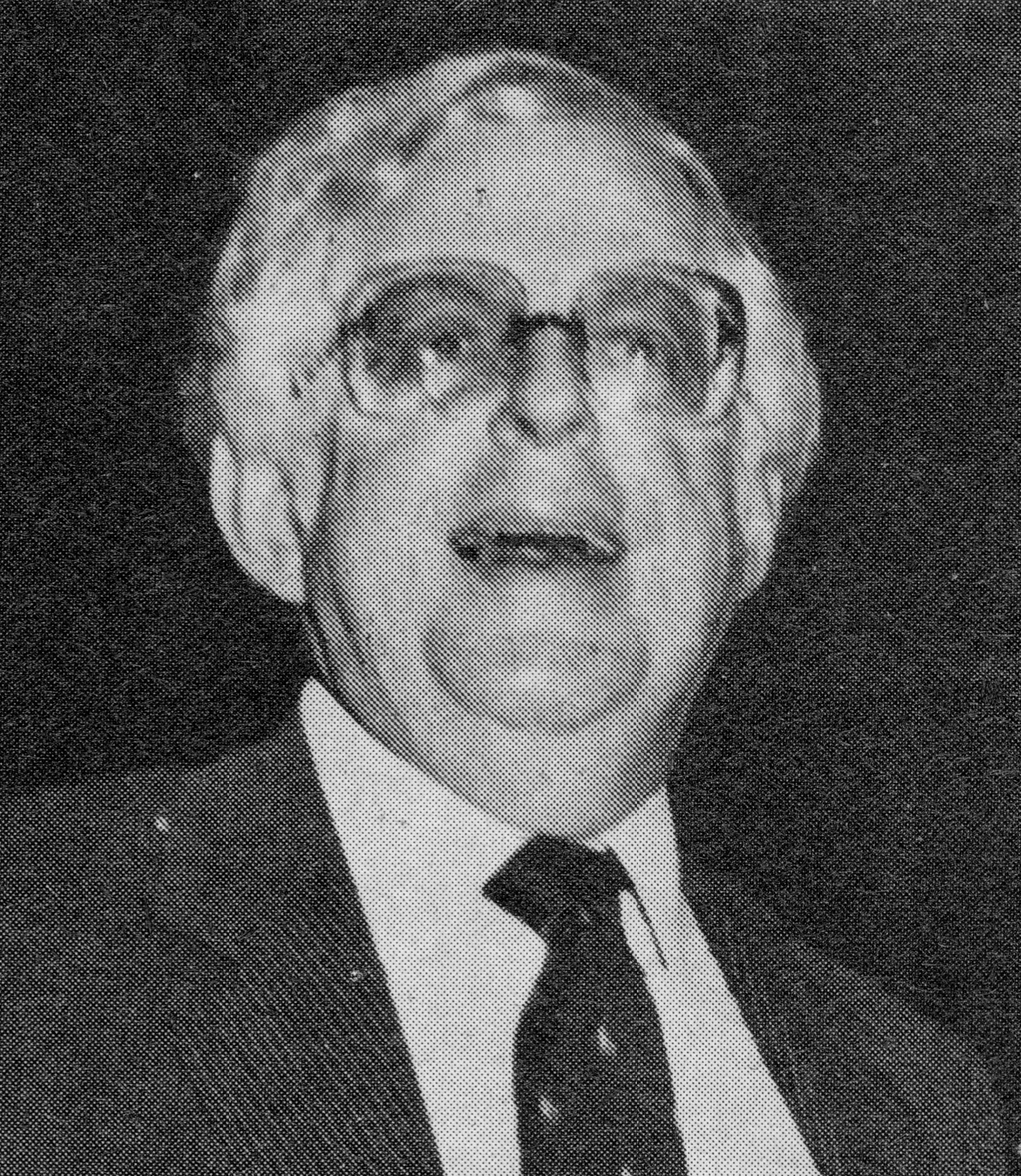
- Barnett at the 1982 National Wrestling Alliance convention
- Born: James Edward Barnett; June 9, 1924; Oklahoma City, Oklahoma, U.S.
- Died: September 18, 2004 (aged 80); Atlanta, Georgia, U.S.
- Education: University of Chicago (PhB)
- Occupations: Promoter; executive
- Years active: 1949–2002
- Organizations: Fred Kohler Enterprises; Georgia Championship Wrestling; Indiana Wrestling; National Council on the Arts; Jim Crockett Promotions; Titan Sports, Inc. / WWE; World Championship Wrestling (Australia); World Championship Wrestling (United States)
- Height: 5 ft 9 in (175 cm)

James Edward Barnett (June 9, 1924 – September 18, 2004) was an American professional wrestling promoter and executive. During his career, he was at times one of the owners of the Indianapolis National Wrestling Alliance promotion, Australia's World Championship Wrestling, and Georgia Championship Wrestling, as well as serving as an executive with the World Wrestling Federation and Jim Crockett Promotions/World Championship Wrestling. He also served as a member of the National Council on the Arts during the Presidency of Jimmy Carter. Barnett was inducted into the Wrestling Observer Newsletter Hall of Fame in 1996, the NWA Hall of Fame in 2005, and the WWE Hall of Fame in 2019.

== Professional wrestling career ==
Barnett was born in Oklahoma City, Oklahoma, where he attended Harding Junior High School followed by Classen High School, graduating in 1943. In 1943, he enrolled in the University of Chicago, studying theater and aspiring to become a playwright. During his time at the University of Chicago, he served as business manager for student newspaper The Chicago Maroon, bringing him into contact with the professional wrestling promoter Fred Kohler. Barnett graduated in 1947 with a Bachelor of Philosophy degree. He would consistently lie, stating that he had either attended Harvard University, or had a master's degree from the University of Chicago.

In 1949 Barnett went to work for Kohler's Chicago-based professional wrestling promotion Fred Kohler Enterprises, writing press releases and serving as deputy editor for the magazine Wrestling as You Like It. He went on to work for Kohler as a road agent, eventually becoming Kohler's right-hand man (in 1954, the New York Daily Mirror jestingly described him as Kohler's "Man Saturday"). Barnett helped Kohler get his Wrestling from Marigold program syndicated across the United States.

In the mid-1950s Barnett became a part-owner (with Kohler) of the National Wrestling Alliance-affiliate Indiana Wrestling, relocating to Indianapolis. While in Indianapolis, Barnett pioneered the practice of recording wrestling matches in a television studio (rather than transporting recording equipment to arenas). Barnett left Fred Kohler Enterprises in 1958.

In the late-1950s Barnett entered into a partnership with wrestling promoter Johnny Doyle and started to run wrestling shows on a national basis in cities including Cincinnati, Detroit, Los Angeles, and Windsor, Ontario, in some cases competing with the National Wrestling Alliance (NWA).

In 1964 Barnett travelled to Sydney in Australia with Doyle to inspect Australia's wrestling scene. Selling his Indianapolis promotion to Dick the Bruiser and Wilbur Snyder and his Detroit promotion to The Sheik, he returned to Australia with Doyle under the banner of World Championship Wrestling (WCW), presenting their first card on October 23, 1964, at the Sydney Stadium. WCW's shows were broadcast in Australia on Nine Network on Saturdays and Sundays; the program later also began airing in New Zealand and southeast Asia. After Doyle died in 1969, Barnett became sole owner of WCW. In the same year, Barnett joined the NWA. In 1974, Barnett sold WCW to Tony Kolonie and returned to the United States.

In 1973, Barnett became a part-owner of the Atlanta-based promotion Georgia Championship Wrestling. After joining Georgia Championship Wrestling, he eventually became secretary-treasurer of the NWA. Barnett used the growth of local Atlanta station Channel 17 into the national cable network TBS to promote Georgia Championship Wrestling. Tommy Rich's less-than-a-week NWA World Heavyweight Championship reign in 1981 was one of Barnett's attempts to boost Georgia gates and secure his primacy within the promotion. During his time running Georgia Championship Wrestling, at the behest of TBS owner Ted Turner, Barnett renamed Georgia Championship Wrestling's eponymous Saturday evening television show to World Championship Wrestling, reusing the name of the Australian promotion he once owned.

In 1975, Barnett was visited in Atlanta by Australian crime kingpin Abe "Mr. Sin" Saffron.

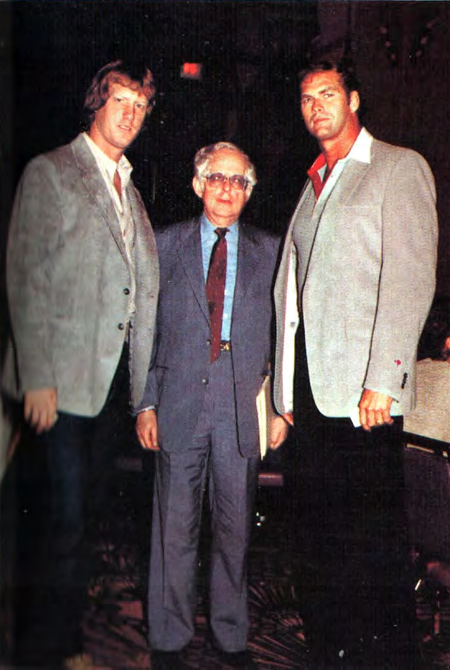
Barnett (center) with David Von Erich and Ron Fuller, c. 1983

Barnett was "edged out" of control of Georgia Championship Wrestling in 1983. In 1984, he brokered the sale of a majority interest in Georgia Championship Wrestling to the World Wrestling Federation (WWF), leading to what was known as Black Saturday, where the WWF took over the former Georgia Championship Wrestling time slot on TBS.

Barnett served as a senior vice president of Titan Sports, Inc., the parent company of the WWF, from 1983 to 1987. While with the WWF, he negotiated the sale of the time slot on TBS to Jim Crockett Promotions, as well as contributing to the first three WrestleMania events. He left the WWF in 1987 after chairman Vince McMahon demanded his resignation.

In late 1987 Barnett began working for Jim Crockett Promotions. When Jim Crockett sold his promotion to the Turner Broadcasting System in November 1988, Barnett stayed on as a senior adviser and a confidant of Turner. The promotion was subsequently renamed World Championship Wrestling (WCW) after its Saturday anchor show at Barnett's suggestion. He worked for WCW until its acquisition by the WWF in 2001.

In 2002 Barnett became a consultant for the WWF, a role he held until his death two years later. During his tenure he identified John Cena to WWE executive Bruce Prichard as "your next guy".

== Political and cultural roles ==
Barnett served as vice chairman of the State of Georgia Board of Medical Assistance and as a member of the Georgia Council of the Arts and Humanities. He was also a board member of the Atlanta Symphony Orchestra and a trustee of the National Symphony Orchestra.

Barnett was active with the Democratic Party. He supported various politicians, including mayor of Atlanta Maynard Jackson, Representative Wyche Fowler, and governor of Georgia George Busbee. He donated $1,000 (equivalent to $5,658 in 2025) to Jimmy Carter's successful 1976 presidential campaign and $1,000 (equivalent to $3,908 in 2025) to Carter's unsuccessful 1980 re-election campaign. Barnett served in Carter's Office of Counsel to the President. In January 1980, he was successfully nominated by Carter to be a member of the National Council on the Arts for a term expiring on September 3, 1980.

== Personal life ==
Barnett was openly gay.

In the 1950s, Barnett allegedly had a relationship with actor Rock Hudson. The book, Thin Thirty, by Shannon Ragland, chronicles Hudson's involvement in a 1962 sex scandal at the University of Kentucky involving the football team. Ragland writes that Jim Barnett, a wrestling promoter, engaged in prostitution with members of the team, and that Hudson was one of Barnett's customers.

In 2003, former football player and wrestler Jim Wilson claimed that Barnett had sabotaged his attempts at a wrestling career after he rejected sexual advances from Barnett in 1973; Barnett denied the allegation, stating that he had sent Wilson home from a tour of Australia due to his having an affair with a stewardess whose airline sponsored World Championship Wrestling.

After being dismissed from the World Wrestling Federation in 1987, Barnett reportedly attempted to commit suicide via an overdose of sleeping pills.

== Death and legacy ==
Barnett died of pneumonia on September 18, 2004, at the age of 80, in Atlanta, Georgia. He had recently developed cancer and broken his arm in a fall.

World Wrestling Federation chairman Vincent J. McMahon described Barnett in 1980 as "an outstanding promoter – probably the best in the country." Barnett was identified by journalist Mike Mooneyham as "an integral part of pro wrestling's national television boom in the '50s" who "oversaw the golden age of wrestling in Australia during the '60s." He was described by the Cauliflower Alley Club (CAC) as "one of the most successful and controversial wrestling promoters in the history of the mat game", with CAC vice president Nick Bockwinkel calling him "the father of television studio wrestling". Journalist Dave Meltzer described Barnett, alongside Eddie Graham, Sam Muchnick, and Vincent J. McMahon, as "the probably most influential men on the promotional end of the industry during the 60s and '70s". Barnett was inducted into the Wrestling Observer Newsletter Hall of Fame in 1996, the NWA Hall of Fame in 2005, and the WWE Hall of Fame in 2019. Writing in 2023, journalist Abraham Josephine Riesman described Barnett as "a colorful, beloved personality, a friend of celebrities, and a pathbreaker for gay men in the athletics industry".

Barnett was known to his contemporaries for his three-piece suits, horn-rimmed glasses, and expression "Oh, my boooooy". Wrestler Jack Brisco described him as resembling "a character out of a Noël Coward play".

== Awards and accomplishments ==
- National Wrestling Alliance
  - NWA Hall of Fame (2005)
- Wrestling Observer Newsletter
  - Wrestling Observer Newsletter Hall of Fame (Class of 1996)
- WWE
  - WWE Hall of Fame (Class of 2019)
