= Frank Tunney =

Canadian wrestling promoter (1912–1983)

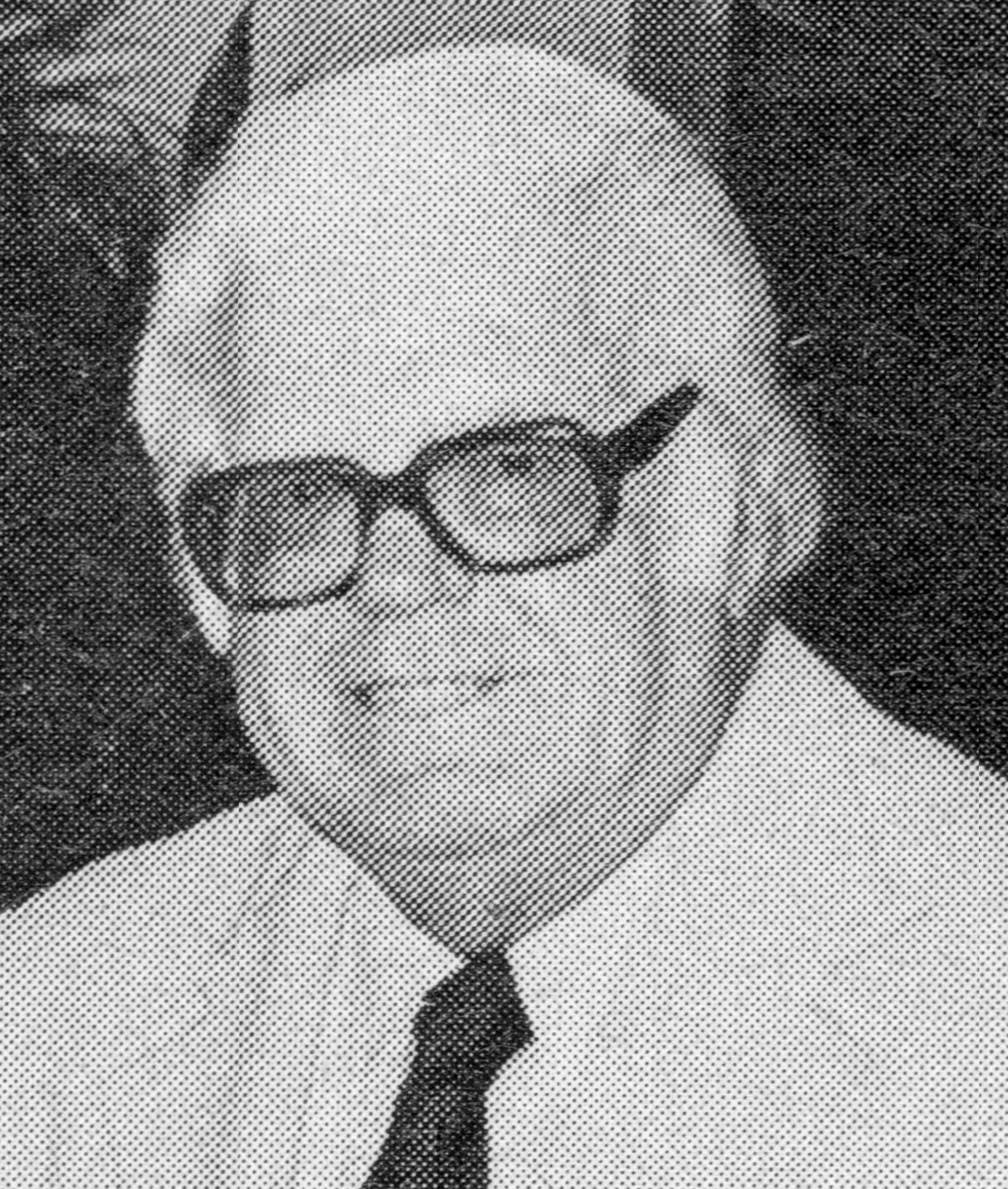
- Tunney at the 1982 National Wrestling Alliance convention

Personal information
- Born: Frank Tunney; November 12, 1912 Toronto, Ontario, Canada
- Died: May 10, 1983 (aged 70) British Hong Kong

Professional wrestling career

Francis Martin Tunney (November 12, 1912 - May 10, 1983) was a Canadian professional boxing and wrestling promoter, based in Toronto.

== Biography ==
=== Early life ===
He was educated in Markham, Ontario, and went to a business college after high school. His first exposure to wrestling came when he answered a classified ad for the Queensbury Athletic Club. The club required a secretary and Tunney was hired by Jack Corcoran to fill that position. It was Corcoran who opened wrestling at Maple Leaf Gardens in November 1931.

At Tunney's request, Corcoran hired his older brother, John Tunney, to be matchmaker. John managed the wrestling promotion through most of the Great Depression, while younger brother Frank was the bookkeeper. In 1939, Corcoran was forced to sell his promotion due to illness. John continued to handle matchmaking duties, with assistance from Paul Bowser, Jack Ganson, and Jerry Monahan. Unexpectedly, John died from influenza on January 19, 1940. Frank was now left in charge and had many struggles in the early weeks. The contributions of wrestler Bill Longson helped to sell tickets while the promotion stayed afloat. In the 1940s Tunney helped promote local boxing stars like Arthur King and others to world prominence at Maple Leaf Gardens.

=== Whipper Billy Watson ===
Of all the wrestlers who ever worked for Tunney, the one who helped to put Tunney's promotion on the map was Whipper Billy Watson. Tunney estimated that Watson drew more than five million people in main events of shows in Toronto. Tunney had never taken Watson seriously in the early years. While Watson was touring England and Ireland, Watson had accumulated a package of newspaper clippings and promotional pieces and mailed them to Tunney. Watson discovered that Tunney had completely disregarded the package. Six months after Watson made his Maple Leaf Gardens debut on October 3, 1940, Tunney faced criticism that he was not willing to give Watson a push. Press writers boasted about the applause that Watson earned, and after more pressure, Tunney booked a tournament on May 1, 1941, in which Watson won. As winner, Watson became number one contender for the regional title, and the victory proved a pivotal turning point for both Watson and Tunney.

=== Elite status ===
Frank Tunney and Eddie Quinn invested in the St. Louis territory in June 1948. It was a way to ensure that the NWA World Champion would make appearances in Toronto and Montreal. The territories in Toronto and Montreal were not granted membership in the NWA until November 1949. Tunney kept his stake in St. Louis until 1974. Eventually, Tunney cut Watson into the business side of wrestling. Watson eventually bought into the St. Louis territory. The Toronto territory was held in such high regard that future world champions used the territory as a barometer to measure potential success. When Bruno Sammartino captured the WWWF Title, he visited Toronto. Another champion who frequented Toronto was Buddy Rogers. His reign as NWA champion created animosity among many promoters. While Rogers was locked in for visits to key territories such as Tunney's in Toronto, there were others who felt that promoters such as Leroy McGuirk, Jim Crockett, Karl Sarpolis, and Cowboy Luttrall, were not essential enough to have Rogers visit.

=== Personality ===
Tunney was always considered non-threatening. He was more comfortable investing his money into other territories rather than pursuing any personal aspirations. Besides St. Louis, Tunney also invested in the territories in Detroit and Indianapolis. His demeanor was such that the NWA executives made him a clear choice to chair the grievance committee. Tunney was also a leading member of the Heavyweight Championship Committee. From an executive standpoint, Tunney was elected as the NWA's First Vice-President in 1954. At the NWA's Annual Meeting, held in Acapulco in 1960, Tunney was voted NWA President. Tunney had long lasting friendships with promoters such as Willie Gilzenberg and Bob Marella, better known as Gorilla Monsoon. Despite Toronto's reputation as an elite territory, Tunney saw the low end of his promotion in 1965. Attendance dwindled to 2,000, but he rebounded with strong booking. The Sheik Edward Farhat and George Scott booked the matches in Toronto during the 1970s and the early 1980s. Another method of keeping Toronto strong was having a working arrangement with Jim Crockett Promotions. This brought talent from Mid-Atlantic Wrestling to have bookings in Toronto.

=== Death ===
During a trip to Hong Kong, Tunney died in his sleep on May 10, 1983, at the age of 70. He was buried at Mount Hope Catholic Cemetery in Ontario. He was survived by his wife Loraine and his three children Eddie, Patricia and Marie from his first wife Edna who died in 1969. He was predeceased by his son Frank Jr. who was a policeman. The funeral was attended by wrestlers Sam Muchnick, Gene Kiniski, Jim Barnett, George Scott, Jim Crockett, Vincent J. McMahon, Fred Ward, and Athol Layton. Frank Tunney Sports Ltd was continued by Frank's son Ed Tunney and his nephew, Jack Tunney. In July 1984, the Tunney family partnered with Vince McMahon and Jack Tunney was the World Wrestling Federation's figurehead president from 1984 to 1995.

== Awards and accomplishments ==
- Wrestling Observer Newsletter
  - Wrestling Observer Newsletter Hall of Fame (Class of 1996)
