= National Wrestling Alliance =

American professional wrestling promotion and governing body

- Trade name: NWA
- Type: Private
- Industry: Professional wrestling; Sports entertainment; Streaming media
- Founded: July 14, 1948; 78 years ago in Waterloo, Iowa, U.S.
- Founders: Pinkie George; Orville Brown; Al Haft; Harry Light; Sam Muchnick; Don Owen; Tony Stecher
- Headquarters: Los Angeles, California, U.S.
- Area served: Worldwide
- Key people: Billy Corgan (President); Pat Kenney (Director of Talent Relations); Billy Trask (Director of Television)
- Products: Live events; Merchandise; Home video; Video on demand
- Services: Licensing
- Parent: National Wrestling Alliance, Inc. (1948–1993); Pro Wrestling Organization LLC (1993–2012); International Wrestling Corp. (2012–2017); Lightning One, Inc. (2017–present)
- Website: nationalwrestlingalliance.com

The National Wrestling Alliance (NWA) is an American professional wrestling promotion and governing body owned by Billy Corgan and operated by its parent company Lightning One, Inc.

Founded in 1948, the NWA began as the governing body for a group of regional promotions, the heads of which made up the board of directors. The group operated a territory system which sanctioned their own company championships while recognizing a singular world champion who defended his title across all the territories, participated in talent exchanges, and collectively protected the territorial integrity of member promotions. Prior to the 1960s, it acted as the sole governing body for professional wrestling in the United States. It remained the largest and most influential body in wrestling until the mid-1980s by which time most of the original member promotions went out of business as a result of the World Wrestling Federation's national expansion. The WWF had been the NWA's Northeastern territory but left the alliance in 1983 ahead of the expansion.

In September 1993, the largest remaining member promotion, World Championship Wrestling (WCW), left the NWA. The NWA continued as a loose coalition of independent promotions, with NWA: Total Nonstop Action (NWA:TNA) given exclusivity over its World Heavyweight and Tag Team championships from June 2002 to May 2007.

In August 2012, the NWA discontinued its memberships and started licensing its brand to wrestling promotions. In 2017, it was purchased by Billy Corgan through his Lightning One, Inc. company. By late 2019–2023, the NWA had transitioned into a stand-alone, singular promotion.

In October 2023, the NWA re-established its territory system, with Michael Hutter's NWA Exodus Pro Midwest being the first promotion sanctioned.

== History ==
=== Formation ===
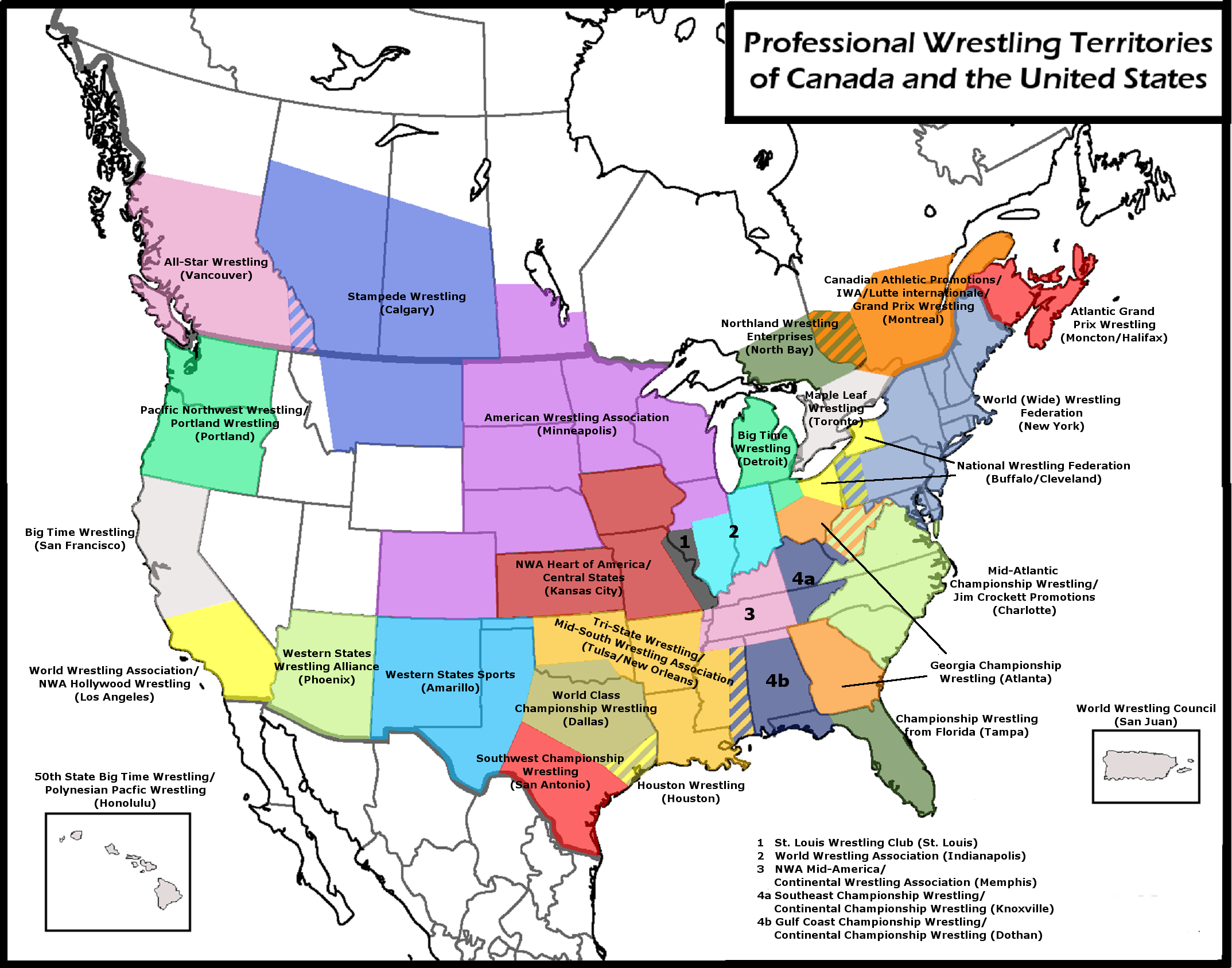
The extinct NWA territory system in North America

In 1948, Paul "Pinkie" George, a professional wrestling promoter from the U.S. Midwest, founded the National Wrestling Alliance with the backing of six other promoters: Al Haft, Tony Stecher, Harry Light, Orville Brown, Don Owen, and Sam Muchnick. The concept of the NWA was to consolidate the championships of these regional companies into one true world championship of professional wrestling, whose holder would be recognized worldwide. The newly formed NWA Board of Directors decided that Brown would become the first ever NWA World Heavyweight Champion.

=== Governing body ===
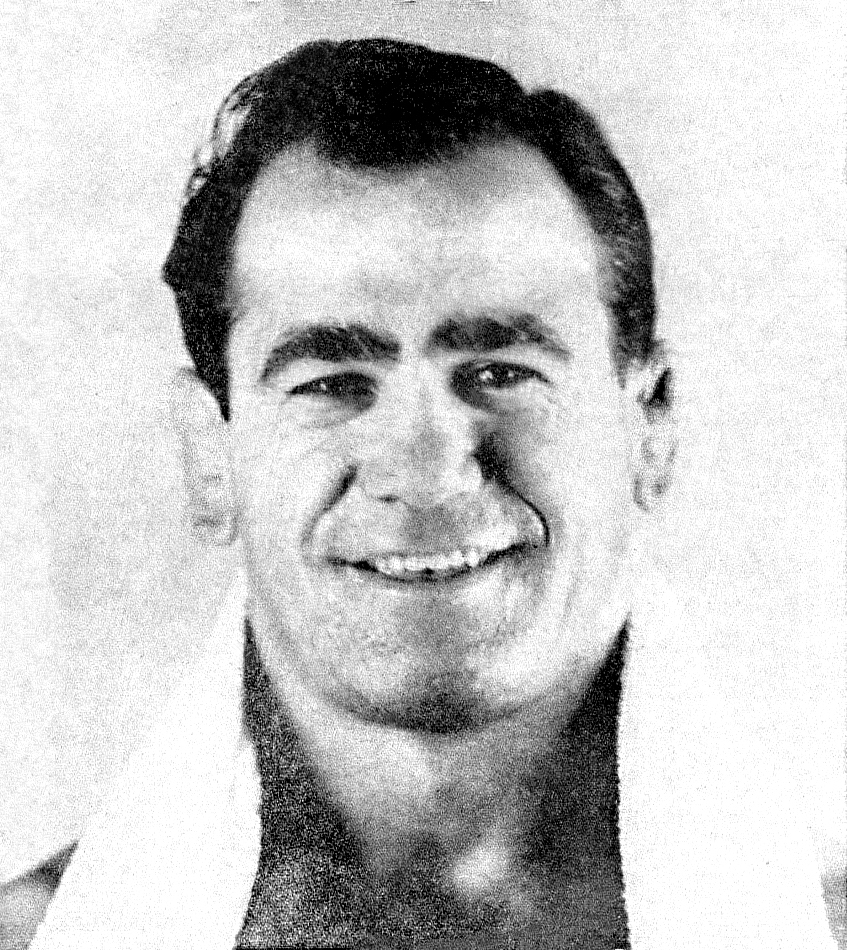
Lou Thesz

==== 1950s–1970s ====
In 1950, Sam Muchnick, one of the original promoters of the NWA and Lou Thesz's booker, was named the governing body's President, a position to which he was unanimously re-elected and held until 1960, making him one of the longest-tenured presidents in the organization's history. Following the advent of television, professional wrestling matches began to be aired nationally during this time, reaching a larger audience than ever before. Rising demand and national expansion made wrestling a much more lucrative form of entertainment than in decades previous. This era went on to be known as the "Golden Age" of professional wrestling. From 1948 to 1955, each of the three major television networks broadcast wrestling shows; the largest supporter being the DuMont Television Network.

In 1956, allegations were made that the NWA was an illegal monopoly blocking competition. An investigation led by the US Department of Justice resulted in the NWA Consent Decree of 1956 (United States v. National Wrestling Alliance). Several promoters left the organization during this time, with some managing to find niches in the United States. In 1957, Montreal promoter Eddie Quinn walked out of the August NWA meeting in St. Louis, having fallen out with Muchnick over a number of issues. At the time Quinn walked out, a wrestler of his named Édouard Carpentier was involved in an angle where he and Lou Thesz were both being presented around the NWA as world champion after Carpentier had a disputed win over Thesz on June 14, 1957.

As the 1950s came to a close, professional wrestling was losing television ratings, and soon TV stations dropped most wrestling shows from their lineups. The remaining televised wrestling promoters had small, local syndicated shows, which aired as late-night filler programming. Promoters started using localized television by purchasing airtime from rival territories, at the consequence of putting some of them out of business.

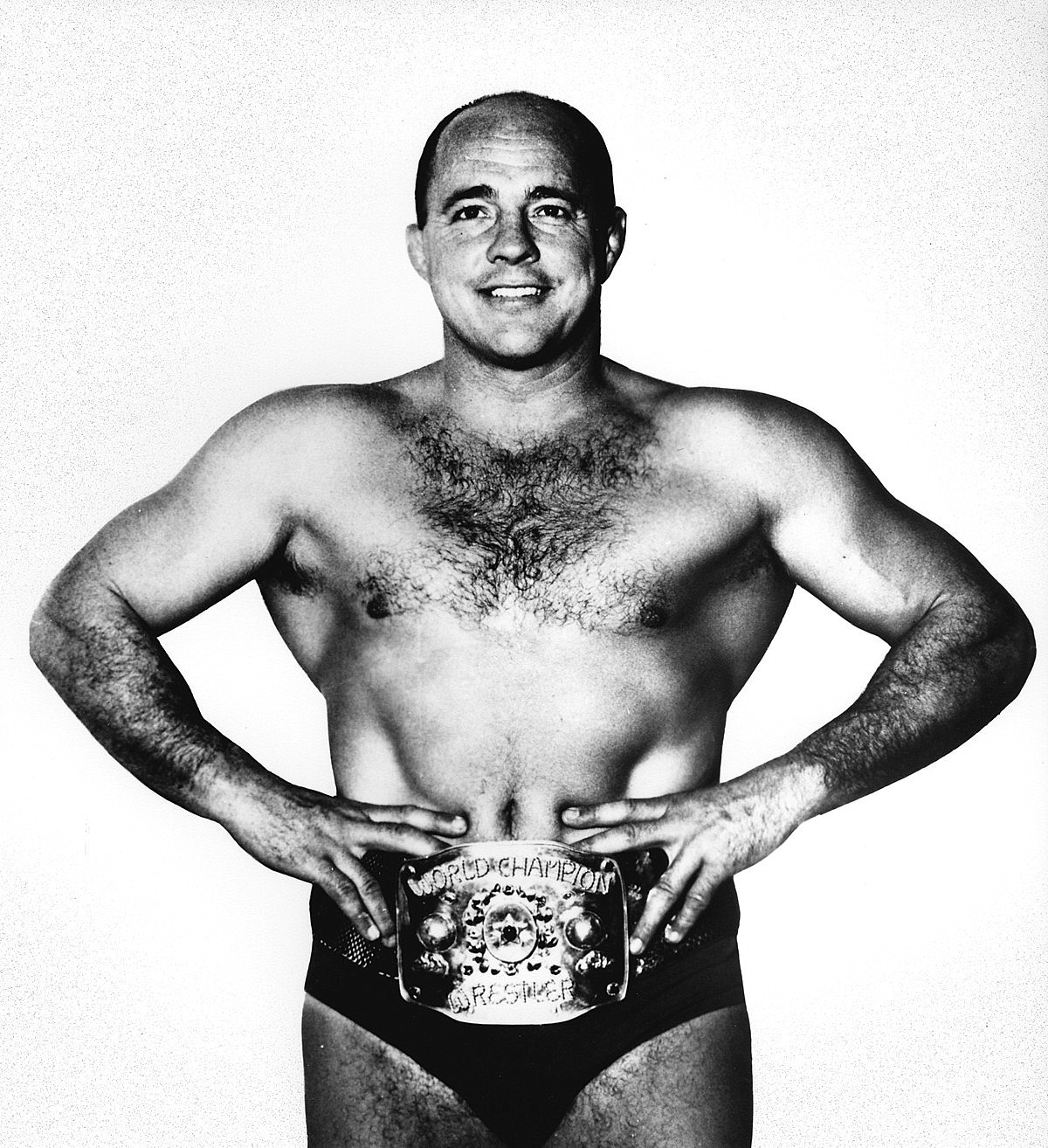
Verne Gagne

On January 24, 1963, at Maple Leaf Gardens in Toronto, Lou Thesz defeated Buddy Rogers in a one-fall match and was declared NWA World Heavyweight Champion for the third and final time. However, after the event, Vincent J. McMahon and Toots Mondt of the Capital Wrestling Corporation (CWC) refused to recognize the title change since Thesz was not a strong draw in their Northeastern territory. They then withdrew the CWC from the NWA. As a result, McMahon and Mondt formed the World Wide Wrestling Federation (WWWF, later to be known as WWE) with Rogers as its first world champion in April 1963. Although both Gagne and McMahon promoted their own world champions, their promotions continued to have representatives on the NWA Board of Directors and regularly exchanged talent with NWA promotions during this time.

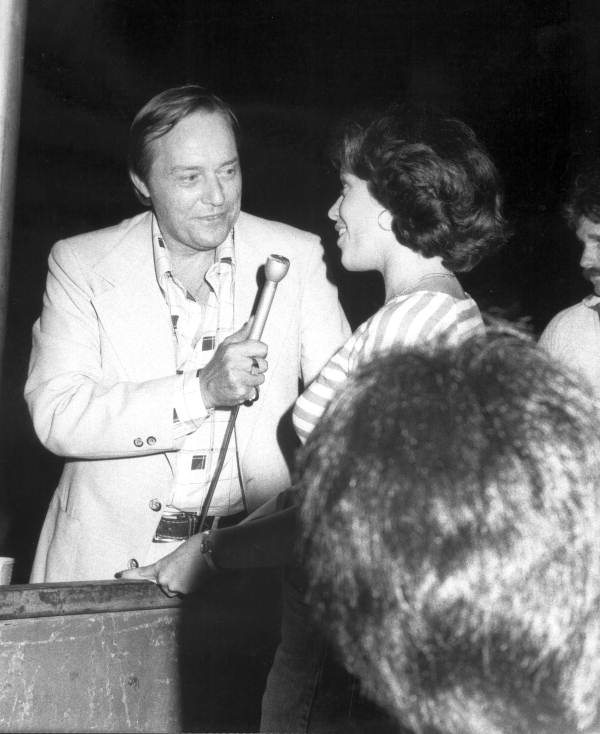
Gordon Solie

Wrestling's popularity continued to decline in the 1970s. They changed their name from the World Wide Wrestling Federation (WWWF) to the World Wrestling Federation (WWF) in 1979. At some point during the decade, Muchnick reportedly declared Atlanta, Georgia as the "leading wrestling city" for its "drawing capacity and near-capacity crowds at the City Auditorium or the Omni every Friday." While the American Wrestling Association (AWA) and World Wide Wrestling Federation/World Wrestling Federation (WWWF/WWF) both faltered during the 1970s, the NWA once again took over as the top promotion and gained huge dominance with their program, Georgia Championship Wrestling, which became the first nationally broadcast wrestling program on cable television through then-superstation TBS in 1979. They brought in Gordon Solie, dubbed "The Walter Cronkite of Professional Wrestling," from former NWA President Eddie Graham's Championship Wrestling from Florida territory to be lead commentator and host.

==== 1980s–1993 ====
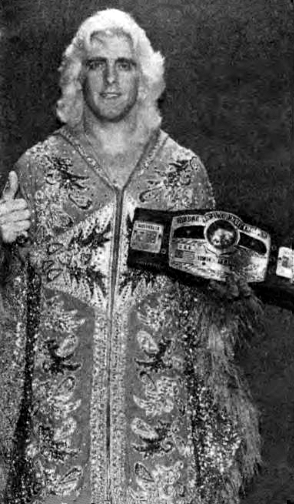
Ric Flair

Videotape trading and cable television paved the way for the decline of the NWA's inter-regional business model, as viewers could now see plot holes and inconsistencies between each territories' storylines. The presence of stars like Ric Flair on TV every week made their special appearances in each region less of a draw.

The WWF left the NWA for good in 1983, as Vincent K. McMahon, who bought the WWF from his father in 1982, worked to get WWF programming on syndicated television all across the United States. That same year, Jim Crockett Promotions (JCP) and the NWA created its primary supercard, Starrcade, the first to be broadcast via closed-circuit networks and was regarded as their flagship event.

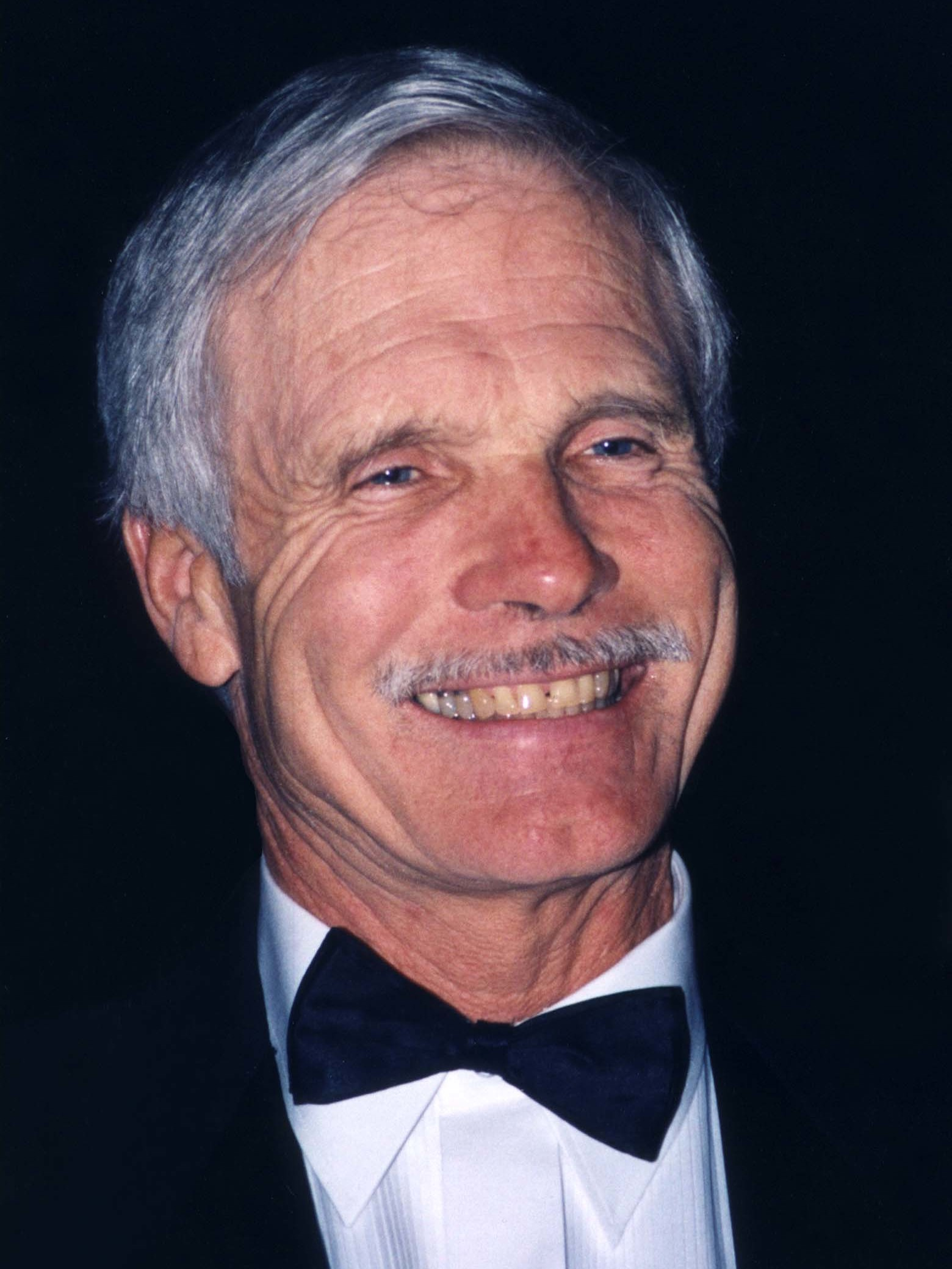
Ted Turner

On Saturday, July 14, 1984, in what would become known as Black Saturday, McMahon bought NWA member Georgia Championship Wrestling (GCW) and merged it into the WWF. The WWF took over GCW's TV slot on TBS, which had been home to GCW's World Championship Wrestling program for 12 years. This move proved disastrous as ratings plummeted, and the WWF ended up losing money on the deal. Then-NWA President Jim Crockett, Jr., the owner of JCP, bought the World Championship Wrestling program from McMahon for $1 million and returned NWA programming to TBS. By 1985, JCP had become the flagship territory of the NWA by acquiring more time slots on TBS and merging with other NWA territories in an attempt to compete with the WWF.

With the success of WrestleMania III in 1987, the WWF scheduled another pay-per-view, Survivor Series, on Thanksgiving night to compete directly with NWA's Starrcade event, and demanded exclusivity from cable providers on carriage of the event. As a result, Starrcade was moved to December the following year, with the show now held around Christmas Day beginning in 1988. The WWF then scheduled their first Royal Rumble event in January 1988 to counterprogram against the NWA's Bunkhouse Stampede. The NWA responded by creating Clash of the Champions on TBS to counterprogram WrestleMania IV.

By 1988, Jim Crockett Promotions was facing bankruptcy. On October 11, under the direction of owner Ted Turner, TBS bought the assets of JCP and renamed it World Championship Wrestling (WCW) after the TV show of the same name. Originally incorporated by TBS as the Universal Wrestling Corporation, Turner promised fans that WCW would retain the athlete-oriented style of the NWA. The sale was completed on November 2, 1988, with a television taping of NWA World Championship Wrestling that very same date in WCW's hometown of Atlanta. By September 1993, WCW would withdraw completely from the NWA.

==== 1993–2012 ====
On August 27, 1994, NWA: Eastern Championship Wrestling (ECW) held a World Title tournament for the vacant NWA World Heavyweight Championship. Unbeknownst to any one, the event was staged for ECW's public withdrawal from the NWA, with tournament winner Shane Douglas throwing down the NWA title belt and instead picking up the ECW Heavyweight Championship belt, proclaiming himself to be the ECW World Heavyweight Champion. ECW founder Tod Gordon subsequently announced ECW's secession from the NWA, rechristening the promotion as Extreme Championship Wrestling.

From 1994 to 1997 the most visible NWA promotion was Dennis Coralluzzo's NWA New Jersey/Championship Wrestling America, which lasted until 2000. NWA New Jersey worked with promotions such as IWA Japan and Steve Corino's North Carolina-based NWA 2000; the latter eventually merged with the New Jersey territory.

In 1998, the World Wrestling Federation reached an agreement to use the likeness of the NWA titles, branding, and its history, to create a storyline. It would be later claimed that WWE still owned the rights. Despite the NWA receiving international television publicity during the angle, it was considered a failure due to low viewer interests.

In June 2002, Jeff and Jerry Jarrett launched a new promotion called NWA: Total Nonstop Action (NWA:TNA). NWA:TNA was given creative control over the NWA World Heavyweight and World Tag Team championships through an agreement with the NWA. This lasted until March 2007, when the NWA terminated its agreement with TNA. TNA lost control over the NWA World Heavyweight and World Tag Team championships by the morning of the 2007 Sacrifice pay-per-view event on May 13.

On September 17, 2010, KDOC-TV Los Angeles premiered NWA: Championship Wrestling from Hollywood.

=== R. Bruce Tharpe and International Wrestling Corp. (2012–2017) ===
In August 2012, International Wrestling Corp., a holding company run by Houston, Texas-based attorney and wrestling promoter R. Bruce Tharpe, sued Trobich, Baucom, the NWA, and its then-parent company, Trobich's Pro Wrestling Organization LLC, claiming insurance fraud regarding the NWA's liability insurance policy. A settlement was negotiated that transferred the rights to the NWA name and trademarks from Trobich's company to Tharpe's.

The new organization moved from a membership model to a licensing model and significantly reduced the amount of territory some of the members held, which caused many promotions to immediately cut ties with the NWA. On September 9, 2012, Championship Wrestling from Hollywood (CWFH) announced it had left the NWA. CWFH was the unofficial home promotion of both the then-current NWA champion (Adam Pearce) and the most recent previous champion (Colt Cabana), both of whom publicly left the NWA, with Pearce vacating the NWA World Title while exiting. Other major NWA territories like NWA Pro/NWA Pro West, NWA Georgia, NWA Pro East, NWA Southwest and NWA Midwest folded.

In 2013, the NWA re-established a relationship with New Japan Pro-Wrestling, where Bruce Tharpe became an on-screen character, portraying a villainous manager of wrestlers representing the NWA. Over the next two years, the NWA World Heavyweight, World Tag Team and World Junior Heavyweight Championships all changed hands at NJPW events.

In September 2016, NWA signed a deal with the new Japanese Diamond Stars Wrestling (DSW) promotion to promote shows in not only Japan, but also other parts of Asia. As part of the deal, DSW chairman Hideo Shimada was appointed the NWA Vice President of the Asian Pacific region while Jimmy Suzuki was appointed senior NWA consultant.

=== Billy Corgan and Lightning One, Inc. (2017–present) ===
==== 2017–2019: Acquisition and relaunch ====
On May 1, 2017, it was reported that Billy Corgan, lead singer of the Smashing Pumpkins, had agreed to purchase the NWA, including its name, rights, trademarks and championship belts. The report was confirmed by Tharpe that same day. Over the following weeks, the NWA trademarks were moved from Tharpe's International Wrestling Corp. over to Corgan's Lightning One, Inc. production company. According to multiple sources, as part of his acquisition of the NWA, Corgan also purchased Tharpe's stake in the NWA's "On Demand" VOD service and licensing of the Paul Boesch wrestling library. Corgan's ownership of the NWA took effect on October 1, 2017. All licenses granted by Tharpe to use the NWA branding expired the previous day, putting Corgan in complete control of both the brand and its championships.

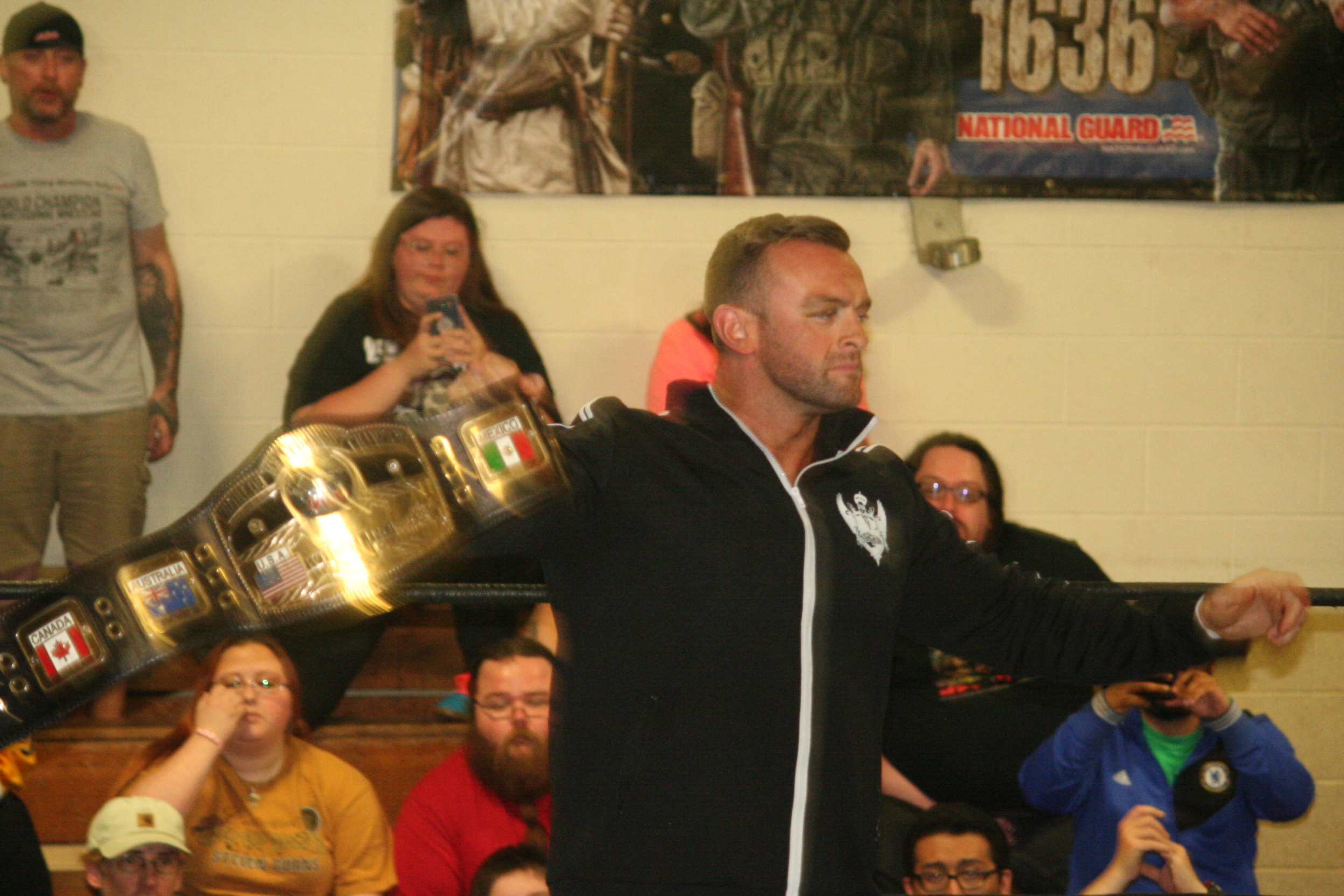
Aldis as the NWA World Heavyweight Champion in April 2018

On September 23, 2017, Nick Aldis made his debut for Championship Wrestling from Hollywood and challenged Tim Storm for the NWA World Heavyweight Championship. The match took place on November 12 and saw Storm retain the title. This was the first title match under the new NWA regime headed by Corgan. On December 9, Aldis defeated Storm in a rematch at Cage of Death 19 to become the new NWA World Heavyweight Champion, making him the second British-born champion after Gary Steele.

In 2018, the NWA briefly allied with Impact Wrestling, the former NWA:TNA, to hold an Empty Arena match at Universal Orlando in Orlando, Florida. It was contested by Tim Storm and Jocephus and served as a qualifier to challenge then-NWA World Heavyweight Champion Nick Aldis. The match was recorded on January 14, 2018, and uploaded to YouTube the next day.

Starting in 2018, NWA allied with Ring of Honor (ROH). NWA wrestlers such as Aldis, James Storm, and Eli Drake appeared at several ROH events, with ROH-contracted talent even winning NWA titles. On September 1, 2018, the NWA World Heavyweight Championship was featured at All In, with Cody Rhodes defeating Aldis for the title, becoming the first second-generation NWA World heavyweight champion. After All In, the NWA returned to hosting its own events. The NWA 70th Anniversary Show, which took place on October 21, 2018, was the first to be produced directly under Lightning One, and was co-produced with Global Force Entertainment; the event was streamed live on FITE TV. The main event saw Aldis defeat Cody to recapture the NWA World Heavyweight Championship and Willie Mack winning a tournament for the vacant NWA National Championship, which became the main secondary title.

The Fourth Crockett Cup, an eight-team, single-elimination tournament that was revived to crown new NWA World Tag Team Champions, took place on April 27, 2019, as another collaboration between the NWA and ROH. This was the last event to be co-promoted with ROH; on July 24, 2019, the NWA announced that they had ended their partnership. Subsequently, it was announced the following month that the NWA would host tapings in Atlanta on September 30 and October 1 for a new television series, later revealed to be titled NWA Powerrr.

==== 2020–2023: COVID-19, restructuring, and departures ====
In January 2020, Marty Scurll, and other Ring of Honor characters, began to appear at NWA events once again as part of an inter-promotional angle. In addition to re-signing with ROH, Scurll joined the company's booking team, enabling him to appear for both the NWA and ROH. However, in the fallout of the Speaking Out Movement, Scurll was accused of having intercourse with a 16-year-old female who was inebriated. After an investigation, Scurll was removed from his position as booker, and by the following January in 2021, was no longer under contract.

Nick Aldis was scheduled to face PCO at Supercard of Honor XIV on April 4, 2020, before the event was cancelled due to the COVID-19 pandemic. On June 18, 2020, Dave Lagana resigned as Vice President of the NWA after allegations of sexual assault were made public. The promotion went on hiatus as a result of this and the pandemic. During this time, several wrestlers also left the NWA, including former Tag Team Champions James Storm, Eli Drake, Marti Belle, and Royce Isaacs, former Women's Champion Allysin Kay, former Television Champion Ricky Starks, former Television Champion Zicky Dice.

NWA World Women's Champion Thunder Rosa made appearances for All Elite Wrestling (AEW) while under contract with the NWA. On September 5, 2020, Rosa unsuccessfully challenged AEW Women's World Championship Hikaru Shida at All Out. On October 27, 2020, Serena Deeb defeated Rosa during the United Wrestling Network's Primetime Live event to become the new NWA World Women's Champion.

On March 2, 2021, the NWA announced their return to promoting events, with the Back for the Attack and new Powerrr episodes as part of a new distribution agreement with FITE TV. As part of this agreement, the NWA removed content from their YouTube channel.

On January 5, 2022, the NWA announced the launch of the NWA All Access subscription package on FITE TV, including past and upcoming pay-per-view events (PPV), new episodes of Powerrr on Tuesdays, and the newly announced NWA USA weekly series. In addition, it was announced that Powerrr would return to YouTube, airing on Fridays after the FITE premiere, and that NWA USA would air on Saturdays on the platform before moving to Sundays on FITE. Finally, it was announced that the NWA would expand their PPV schedule to six events per year, as part of a new deal with FITE TV. Though the partnership ended in 2023, with NWA's programming returning to YouTube, FITE still carries NWA PPV events.

==== 2023–present: Return of the territories; The CW partnership ====
On October 9, 2023, the NWA reestablished itself as a governing body, with EC3's NWA Exodus Pro Midwest being the first territory to be sanctioned. On December 4, NWA welcomed Joe Cazana Promotions (JCP) to their territory system.

On October 18, it was reported by news blog Haus of Wrestling that NWA had signed a deal with The CW to air Powerrr and a reality show documenting behind the scenes footage. However, a controversial segment from that month's Samhain PPV event, in which Father James Mitchell along with several women and wrestlers were seen pretending to consume cocaine, drew negative reactions online. The following month, The CW signed a deal with WWE for its weekly NXT program. Though it was rumored to be in-response to the Samhain segment, Corgan later revealed in a 2024 interview with Fightful that the CW executives didn't have a problem with the spot, and that "it was a completely invented story by either a troll inside the company, a leaker or something.”

Following Samhain, episodes of Powerrr were later added to The CW's app in November. In January 2024, NWA announced that new episodes of Powerrr would be available on The CW app from February 6. The same year, NWA included new territories: NWA Chicago in Chicago, Illinois, Kross Fire Wrestling (KFW) in Sevierville, Tennessee, World League Wrestling in Missouri as NWA's developmental system, and NWA Texas.

On May 16, 2025, Variety reported that Paramount Global Content Distribution would launch Wrestling Central, a free ad-supported streaming television (FAST) channel on The Roku Channel in the United States and Canada. The channel will feature weekly NWA matches alongside WOW – Women of Wrestling, marking NWA's first appearance on a FAST platform. Programming includes new matches, classic episodes, previously unreleased content, specials, and documentaries. On June 10, Deadline announced that NWA has signed a streaming deal with Roku, airing in the U.S., Canada, and Mexico.

== NWA presidents ==
#	Name	Term	Home promotion
1	Paul "Pinkie" George	1948–50	NWA Iowa
2	Sam Muchnick	1950–60	Sam Muchnick Sports Attractions / St. Louis Wrestling Club
3	Frank Tunney	1960–61	Maple Leaf Wrestling
4	Fred Kohler	1961–62	Fred Kohler Enterprises
5	Karl Sarpolis	1962–63	Western States Sports
6	Sam Muchnick	1963–75	St. Louis Wrestling Club
7	Fritz Von Erich	1975–76	World Class Championship Wrestling
8	Eddie Graham	1976–78	Championship Wrestling from Florida
9	Bob Geigel	1978–80	Central States Wrestling
10	Jim Crockett, Jr.	1980–82	Jim Crockett Promotions
11	Bob Geigel	1982–85	Central States Wrestling
12	Jim Crockett, Jr.	1985–86	Jim Crockett Promotions
13	Bob Geigel	1986–87	Central States Wrestling
14	Jim Crockett, Jr.	1987–91	Jim Crockett Promotions / World Championship Wrestling
15	Jim Herd	1991–92	World Championship Wrestling
16	Seiji Sakaguchi	1992–93	New Japan Pro-Wrestling
17	Jim Crockett, Jr.	1993–95	NWA Dallas
17	Dennis Coralluzzo	1993–95	Championship Wrestling America
17	Steve Rickard	1993–95	All Star Pro Wrestling
18	Howard Brody	1995	NWA Florida
18	Dennis Coralluzzo	1995	Championship Wrestling America
18	Steve Rickard	1995	All Star Pro Wrestling
19	Steve Rickard	1995–96	All Star Pro Wrestling
20	Howard Brody	1996–2001	NWA Florida
21	Jim Miller	2001–02	NWA East / Pro Wrestling eXpress
22	Richard Arpin	2002–03	NWA Tri-State
23	Bill Behrens	2003–04	NWA Wildside
24	Ernie Todd	2004–05	Canadian Wrestling Federation
25	Robert Trobich (Note: Held title of Executive Director.)	2005–12	—
26	David Baucom	2012	NWA Carolinas
27	R. Bruce Tharpe	2012–17	NWA World Class
28	Billy Corgan	2017–present	—

== Programming and events ==
=== Current ===
==== NWA Powerrr ====
Powerrr is the flagship program of the NWA which airs on Comet. The series debuted on October 8, 2019, originally airing on the NWA's YouTube channel. From 2021 to the end of 2022, the show had a first airing on Tuesday at 6:05 pm ET on FITE TV, with the episode debuting on the NWA's YouTube channel later in the same week in Friday at 6:05 pm ET. Powerrr streamed on The Roku Channel beginning July 29, 2025.

A companion series, titled NWA Power Surge (stylized as NWA Powerrr Surge), premiered on April 13, 2021, and features wrestler interviews, unseen matches, and Powerrr recaps.

=== Former ===
==== Ten Pounds of Gold ====
Ten Pounds of Gold is a documentary series chronicling the journey and career of the current NWA Worlds Heavyweight Champion as well as others in the division. Debuting on October 20, 2017, on the NWA's YouTube channel, it was the first series to be produced after the organization's acquisition.

==== NWA Shockwave ====
NWA Shockwave was a web television program that aired on the NWA's YouTube channel and Facebook page. The series debuted on December 1, 2020. On August 10, 2020, it was announced that the NWA will partner with the United Wrestling Network (UWN) to produce a live, weekly pay-per-view (PPV) series named UWN Primetime Live. Matches from this series would also be featured as part of Shockwave.

==== NWA USA ====
NWA USA is a weekly program that debuted on January 8, 2022, on YouTube and focuses on the NWA Junior Heavyweight Championship division. The last episode was released May 8, 2023.

== Championships and accomplishments ==
=== Men's division ===
Singles

Championship	Current champion(s)	Reign	Date won	Days held	Location	Notes	Ref.
NWA World's Heavyweight Championship	Silas Mason	1	August 16, 2025	463+	Huntington, New York	Defeated Thom Latimer at NWA 77. Aired on tape delay on November 18, 2025 as a special episode of NWA Powerrr.	
NWA National Heavyweight Championship	Bryan Idol	1	June 6, 2026	169+	Atlanta, Georgia	Defeated Mike Mondo at Hard Times 6. Aired on tape delay on August 15, 2026, as a special episode of Powerrr	
NWA Mid-America Heavyweight Championship	Jeremiah Plunkett	1	June 1, 2024	904+	Knoxville, Tennessee	Defeated Dante Casanova, Hunter Drake, and Mario Parua in a four-way elimination match to win the re-introduced title at NWA Back to the Territories. Aired at NWA Powerrr on tape delay on September 3, 2024.	
NWA World Junior Heavyweight Championship	Hayden Backlund	1	July 25, 2026	120+	Philadelphia, Pennsylvania	Won the vacant title by defeated Damian Fenrir, Axton Ray and Richard Adonis in a four-way match at NWA 78. Aired on tape delay on August 29, 2026, as a special episode of Powerrr.	
NWA World Television Championship	Mzry	1	April 25, 2026	211+	Tampa, Florida	Won the vacant title by defeating Daisy Kill, Wrecking Ball Legursky, Lockjaw Drake, and JAC in a five-way match during the NWA Powerrr tapings. Aired on tape delay on June 6, 2026. Previous champion Bryan Idol voluntarily vacated the championship to invoke the "Lucky Seven Rule" and challenge for the NWA World's Heavyweight Championship.	

Tag team

Championship	Current champion(s)	Reign	Date won	Days held	Location	Notes	Ref.
NWA World Tag Team Championship	The Country Gentlemen (AJ Cazana and KC Cazana)	1	April 25, 2026	211+	Tampa, Florida	Defeated The Immortals (Kratos and Odinson) on NWA Powerrr. Aired on tape delay on May 30, 2026.	
NWA United States Tag Team Championship	The Hardway (Jack Vaughn and Dalton McKenzie)	1	June 6, 2026	169+	Atlanta, Georgia	Defeated The Slimeballz (Sage Chantz and Tommy Rant) at Hard Times 6 Aired on tape delay on August 1, 2026 as a special episode of Powerrr.	

=== Women's division ===
Singles

Championship	Current champion(s)	Reign	Date won	Days held	Location	Notes	Ref.
NWA World Women's Championship	Tiffany Nieves	1	April 4, 2026	232+	Forney, Texas	Defeated Natalia Markova at the Crockett Cup; This was Nieves' Burke Invitational Gauntlet cash-in match Aired on tape delay May 16, 2026 as a special episode of NWA Powerrr	
NWA World Women's Television Championship	Sirena Veil	1	July 25, 2026	120+	Philadelphia, Pennsylvania	Defeated Gisele Shaw at NWA 78; Airing on tape delay on September 12, 2026, as a special episode of NWA Powerrr.	

Tag team

Championship	Current champion(s)	Reign	Date won	Days held	Location	Notes	Ref.
NWA World Women's Tag Team Championship	Liviyah and Mackenzie Morgan	1	August 22, 2026	92+	Tampa, Florida	Defeated Pretty Empowered (Kenzie Paige and Kylie Paige) in a two out of three falls match on NWA Powerrr; Aired on tape delay on October 31, 2026.	

== See also ==
- National Wrestling Alliance on television
- List of National Wrestling Alliance championships
- List of National Wrestling Alliance territories
