= Pinkie George =

American wrestling promoter, boxer and businessman (1905–1993)

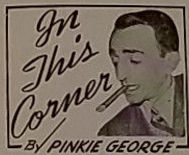
- Gypsy Joe and his wife on p.4 of World's Light-HeavyWeight Champion 1940s magazine
- Born: Paul Lloyd Georgeacopoulos; January 22, 1905; Lowell, Massachusetts, U.S.
- Died: November 1, 1993 (aged 88)
- Occupations: Professional wrestling promoter, boxer, sports promoter
- Known for: Founder and first President of the National Wrestling Alliance

Paul "Pinkie" George (born Paul Lloyd Georgeacopoulos; January 22, 1905 – November 1, 1993) was an American professional wrestling promoter, boxer and businessman best known as the visionary behind, and first president of, the National Wrestling Alliance. He operated the NWA's Iowa territory, one of the primary members of the NWA based in Des Moines. Described by Sam Muchnick as the father of the NWA, George was inducted into the NWA Hall of Fame in 2014.

== Early life ==
Georgeacopoulos was born to Greek parents, Limberis "Louis" and Elizabeth Bolanis Georgeacopoulos, in Lowell, Massachusetts, on January 22, 1905. When he was a teenager, he and his family (including younger brother Andrew) relocated to Black Hawk County, Iowa, where their surname was changed to "George". After completing school, Pinkie embarked on a stint as a boxer, first as an amateur and then as a professional. Fighting as a flyweight, he competed in over 160 bouts with limited success. On August 29, 1928, he suffered a knockout defeat to Speedy Dado, which was a turning point in his tenure as a boxer.

== Career ==
After marrying his wife, Elizabeth, Georgeacopoulos embarked on a promotional career in Mason City, Iowa. They relocated to Des Moines, Iowa, where George promoted his first professional wrestling match between Joe Stecher and George Vassel in 1928. On September 20, 1934, George was one of many promoters to attend the Ed Lewis–Londos bout at Wrigley Field. He managed numerous fighters such as Johnny Paychek, Glen Flanagan, Abel Cestac and Lee Savold.

In 1948, he brought a National Basketball League franchise (the Waterloo Hawks) to Iowa, which proved to be unsuccessful. After losing $20,000 in under a year, he sold the franchise to his brother Andy and Charley Shipp.

As a wrestling promoter, George worked closely with fellow promoters in Kansas, Nebraska, Minnesota, and Missouri.

By 1950, the NWA had 26 members throughout a territory stretching from Montreal in Canada to Honolulu, Hawaii. As was planned, George stepped down as President of the NWA at the end of 1950, having taken on the role in 1948. In a further letter to Pfefer dated June 8, 1950, he stated that "in September, my term ends and Sam Muchnick will be elected, as I think he is the fellow deserving of it".

George continued to run the wrestling scene in Iowa, with grapplers such as Verne Gagne, Bob Orton, Johnny Valentine and Pat O’Connor making their name in the territory. On January 23, 1951, George incorporated the NWA as a non-profit with a code of ethnics in Iowa for tax purposes, helping ensure its survival for years to come.

George grew disillusioned with the direction of the NWA, which he was not reluctant to express, but nevertheless remained confident in the new Presidency of Muchnick. Tensions, however, grew, and George withdrew from the NWA board of directors in 1951. With bitterness and rivalry at its height in 1957 between the NWA and rival promoters/wrestlers, such as Wladek Zbyszko, George Simpson and Sonny Myers, George claimed that he received a phone call telling him to get out of the wrestling business or "we’ll deliver your body to your wife". This prompted George to purchase a gun. George alleged that this was a part of a "one-sided wrestling war" to "harass, scare and discourage (him) out of the business". He also believed it was timed to coincide with a federal investigation against the NWA for alleged monopolistic practices.

The case against the NWA went to trial in December 1958. Simpson testified against Pinkie, stating he had had difficulty booking wrestlers within the NWA system but that he had recently straightened things out with Muchnick and Brown. Muchnick himself testified as a witness for the plaintiff, but did little to harm the NWA or Pinkie George. A jury found in favor of Pinkie and the NWA on December 8.

== Later life ==
George was angry at what he perceived as treachery from his peers, including Muchnick. In a letter to NWA members, he resigned from the Alliance, stating that "a very small minority of the Alliance, including President Muchnick, are in violation of the government decree. Interlocking regional monopolies that control the champion endanger every member of the alliance". George would have friction with the NWA over the next several years, including an infamous federal anti-trust lawsuit. He would continue to promote boxing in the region and was an active citizen into his senior years. In 1964, he was the manager of future boxing World Welterweight Champion Curtis Cokes.

== Legacy ==
Pinkie George is remembered as the visionary behind the National Wrestling Alliance and the man responsible for laying the foundations of what would become perhaps the most respected organization in the business. In 2014, he was inducted into the NWA Hall of Fame.

His great-grandson, Paul George IV, works as a professional wrestling promoter in Iowa.
