= Lee Wykoff =

American football player and professional wrestler (1898–1974)

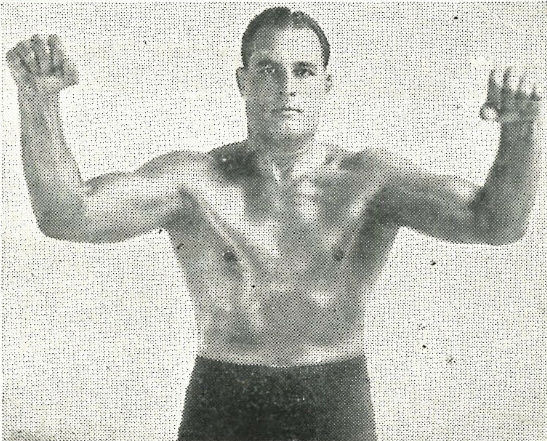
- Wykoff in 1940

Personal information
- Born: Lee Arlo Wykoff; March 10, 1898 Mayetta, Kansas, U.S.
- Died: April 2, 1974 (aged 76) Kansas City, Kansas, U.S.
- Education: Washburn University
- Spouses: Nada Belle Henrietta Hayes (m. 1920; died 1935) Eleanor Wykoff
- Children: 2

Professional wrestling career
- Ring name(s): Big Bad Wolf; Black Panther; Lee Wyckoff; Lee Wycoff; Lee Wykoff
- Billed height: 6 ft 1 in (185 cm)
- Billed weight: 215 lb (98 kg)
- Billed from: Mayetta, Kansas

Lee Arlo Wykoff, often misspelled as "Wyckoff", (March 10, 1898 - April 2, 1974) was a professional wrestler in the United States. Throughout his career he wrestled for various U.S. based territorial promotions including the St. Louis Wrestling Club (SLWC), Gulf Athletic Club (GAC), NWA Hollywood Wrestling, Atlantic Athletic Commission (AAC) and Midwest Wrestling Association.

== Early life ==
Lee Wykoff was born in Mayetta, KS to Charles and Ethel (Haynes) Wykoff on March 10, 1898. Charles Wykoff was a blacksmith. The family settled in Osborne, Kansas in 1908 where Lee attended school.

== Collegiate sports career ==
Wykoff attended Washburn University in Topeka, Kansas, where he was a member of the Student Army Training Corps. He played football for the Washburn Ichabods from 1918 to 1920. He was named all-state fullback in 1919 and 1920.

== Professional football career ==
Wykoff played in the National Football League for the St. Louis All-Stars as a fullback/halfback in 1923.

== Professional wrestling career ==
A skilled wrestler, Wykoff had exceptional shooting skills. His signature finishing move was a stepover toehold.

In his career, Wykoff wrestled for the St. Louis Wrestling Club (SLWC), Gulf Athletic Club (GAC), NWA Hollywood Wrestling, Atlantic Athletic Commission (AAC), and MWA. He is best remembered for his tenure with the MWA where he was a four-time MWA World Heavyweight champion. He had many memorable bouts within the MWA against Orville Brown.

In 1931, Wykoff defeated NFL player Father Lumpkin in the Cleveland, OH Equestrium with two straight falls.

Wykoff and Ed "Strangler" Lewis matched up in a shoot contest on August 13, 1936, at the Hippodrome in New York City. The match went 2 hours and 14 minutes before both wrestlers fell from the ring and were counted out.

In an early wrestler vs. boxer match up, Wykoff defeated boxer Harry Thomas in April 1938 in Kansas City.

Wykoff won the MWA World Heavyweight Title (Kansas City) in April 1941 by defeating Orville Brown at Memorial Hall in Kansas City. Wykoff held the title for 182 days before losing it back to his nemesis Brown.

In January 1943, Wykoff regained the MWA World Heavyweight Title (Kansas City) from Ed "Strangler" Lewis. Wykoff lost the title to Orville Brown 35 days later. Wykoff would regain the title later in 1943 before losing it to Brown once again.

Wykoff defeated Dave Levin for the MWA World Heavyweight Title (Kansas City) in June 1944. Orville Brown defeated Wykoff 48 days later to claim the title.

== Personal life ==
Wykoff married Nada Belle Henrietta Hayes on February 17, 1920, in Topeka. Two children were born to the couple; Dorothy Louise Wykoff Wilber and Robert Lee Wykoff. Robert died in an auto accident in 1930 at the age of 4. Nada Belle died in 1935. Lee then married Eleanor Wykoff.

== Championships and accomplishments ==
- Midwest Wrestling Association
  - MWA World Heavyweight Championship (4 times)
  - Kansas Heavyweight Championship (1 time)

== See also ==
- List of gridiron football players who became professional wrestlers
