= John Pesek =

American professional wrestler and dog breeder

Personal information
- Born: February 21, 1894 Ravenna, Nebraska, U.S.
- Died: March 12, 1978 (aged 84) Ravenna, Nebraska, U.S.
- Spouse: Myrl Pesek (née Mahoney) (1921–1966, her death)
- Children: 7

Professional wrestling career
- Ring name: John Pesek
- Billed height: 6 ft (183 cm)
- Billed weight: 185 lb (84 kg)
- Billed from: Ravenna, Nebraska
- Debut: 1914
- Retired: 1965

John Pesek (February 21, 1894 – March 12, 1978) was an American professional wrestler and greyhound racing dog breeder. Nicknamed 'The Nebraska Tiger Man' for his ferocity, aggression and catlike dexterity, Olympic freestyle wrestling gold medallists Robin Reed and Russell Vis both regarded Pesek as the greatest wrestler they ever met. He was a one-time National Wrestling Association World Heavyweight Champion.

== Early life ==
Pesek was born to Bohemian parents near Ravenna, Nebraska, the fifth of seven children, and grew up in a small town in the Midwestern prairie. His father Martin died in an accident when John was twelve.

== Professional wrestling career ==
Pesek originally planned a career in boxing, but took to professional wrestling instead, with which he became familiar by attending the traveling carnivals of the era. His first high-profile match was in 1914 when he defeated Wladek Zbyszko.

Pesek was nicknamed "The Nebraska Tiger Man" for his ferocity and catlike dexterity. He was also legitimately strong and could hold his own on the mat against opponents that frequently outweighed him considerably. Pesek is recorded as losing only about 20 matches in his entire career, which he began undefeated until January 16, 1920, when he lost to fellow Nebraskan Joe Stecher. Among the few other men to ever defeat Pesek were Jim Londos and Ed "Strangler" Lewis. A true "hooker" who believed in professional wrestling as legitimate competitive sport, Pesek disliked the wrestling "trust" that emerged in the 1920s for its booking of pre-determined match outcomes. His reluctance to co-operate with promoters isolated him from the wrestling mainstream for much of his career.

One important wrestling figure with whom Pesek did agree to work was Ed Lewis, for whom he became a "policeman" to ward off the so-called "trustbusters", outlaw wrestlers who posed threats to promotions and their champions by refusing to co-operate (fix matches) during matches. On November 14, 1921, Pesek squared off against one of the most prominent trustbusters, Croatian-born wrestler Marin Plestina at Madison Square Garden. Pesek proceeded to administer such a severe beating (through continual fouling) that Plestina was hospitalized. All three falls of the match were forfeited due to repeated head butting and eye gouging by Pesek. His repeated fouling caused a near riot. The New York Times credits Plestina with "intensified fairness" in the face of Pesek's continued fouling. This is the reason Pesek was banned from wrestling for life in New York. These comments are taken from a New York Times article dated November 15, 1921. New York's athletic commission refused to award Pesek his prize money and banned him from wrestling in the state, but the Tiger Man had done his job.

On another occasion, Pesek was hired to give Lewis' ally, Boston-area promoter Paul Bowser, a hand in his battle with rival promoter Jack Curley. Curley was aggressively promoting Olympic wrestling medalist Nat Pendleton and issued a series of haughty challenges, among them boasting that Pendleton could beat Lewis and any other wrestler on the same night. Pesek was enlisted to face Curley's protégé, and in a legitimate contest held on January 25, 1923, Pesek defeated and injured Pendleton to claim an $8000 purse and give Bowser a major financial and publicity victory.

Pesek would memorably cross paths with Joe Stecher again, wrestling him three times in 1926. Stecher, now the world champion, won the first meeting on April 29, and the second match on August 25 ended in a draw. Then, on October 6 at Los Angeles' Olympic Auditorium, subbing for Ed Lewis, Pesek diverted from the planned result and trapped Stecher in a wrist lock. Stecher appeared to submit, but in order to save face the referee disqualified Pesek under the pretense that he had used an illegal choke hold, allowing Stecher to retain the title. Stecher was said to have cried after the match.

Despite making a good living in America, Pesek eventually grew tired of backroom politics and opted to go overseas for a while in 1929. Traveling to New Zealand and Australia, he became a sensation there, winning 47 consecutive bouts.

Pesek's reputation as a maverick held him back from holding many championships in his career, and he has been characterized as a "trustbuster" in his own right. It turned out that none of the titles he did hold were either won or lost in the ring. From 1931 to 1933, he was the recognized Midwest Wrestling Association (MWA) champion, until he forfeited the title to wrestle for another promotion. Later, Pesek was recognized for a time as National Wrestling Association champion. He was belatedly given the vacant NWA championship on September 13, 1937, as he had been the only man to post a $1000 bond for a proposed tournament one year earlier. However, he was soon stripped of the title when he refused to meet two challengers. Pesek was again awarded the vacant MWA championship in 1938, but was stripped of it in June 1940 for, once again, failing to meet the top contenders.

By the end of the 1920s, Pesek had begun turning his focus towards racing greyhounds, and on 800 acres (3.2 km^{2}) of his Nebraska farm he built up one of the nation's leading stables. He won several national titles, and the pedigree of one of his greatest dogs, Australian-born "Just Andrew", could be found in 95 percent of American greyhound stock by 1975.

Pesek semi-retired from professional wrestling by the early 1940s to focus on his greyhound racing career, but he continued to appear occasionally in special exhibition matches through the 1950s, long enough to wrestle on the same card as son Jack, who would go on to enjoy a lengthy wrestling career of his own. He wrestled his final exhibition match in 1965.

== Personal life ==
Pesek married Myrl Mahoney (died 1966) on February 14, 1921. The couple had seven children: Elizabeth, Jack, Virginia, Mary Lee, Kevin, Catherine and Steve. Jack Pesek went on to become a professional wrestler like his father.

Pesek died at his home on March 12, 1978, from a heart attack. He was buried at the Highland Cemetery outside Ravenna. A bronze statue of Pesek with two greyhounds was being created at the time of his death, and it was unveiled in front of Ravenna Bank on May 28, 1978.

== Legacy ==
Although lesser known than some of his contemporaries, John Pesek is recognized today as one of the best wrestlers of his era. He was inducted into the Professional Wrestling Hall of Fame in 2005, as well as the Wrestling Observer Newsletter Hall of Fame in 1996; Pesek had earlier been inducted into the Lincoln Journal's Nebraska Sports Hall of Fame in 1957. His contributions to the sport of greyhound racing have also been recognized by his induction to the Greyhound National Hall Of Fame in 1978 – his dogs "Gangster" and "Just Andrew" were inducted in 1964 and 1975, respectively.

== Championships and accomplishments ==
- George Tragos/Lou Thesz Professional Wrestling Hall of Fame
  - Class of 2005
- Midwest Wrestling Association
  - MWA World Heavyweight Championship (Ohio version) (3 times)
- National Wrestling Association
  - NWA World Heavyweight Championship (1 time)
- Nebraska Sports Hall of Fame
  - Class of 1957
- Nebraska Pro Wrestling Hall of Fame (Class of 2022)
- Professional Wrestling Hall of Fame and Museum
  - (Class of 2005)
- Wrestling Observer Newsletter
  - Wrestling Observer Newsletter Hall of Fame (Class of 1996)
