= Orville Brown =

American professional wrestler (1908–1981)

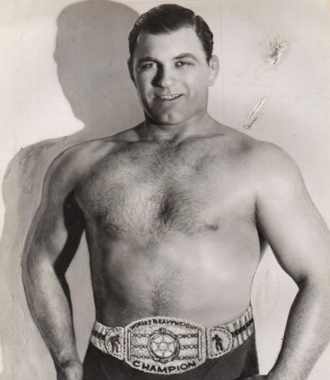

Personal information
- Born: March 10, 1908 Sharon, Kansas, U.S.
- Died: January 24, 1981 (aged 72) Lee's Summit, Missouri, U.S.
- Spouse: Grace Brown (m. 1927–1981)
- Children: 1

Professional wrestling career
- Ring name: Orville Brown
- Billed height: 6"1
- Billed weight: 240 lb (109 kg)
- Trained by: Ernest Brown
- Debut: 1929
- Retired: 1950

Orville Brown (March 10, 1908 – January 24, 1981) was an American professional wrestler. He is a thirteen-time world champion and was recognized as the first NWA World Heavyweight Champion in 1948. Brown's professional wrestling career ended on November 1, 1949, when he suffered severe injuries in an automobile accident.

== Early life ==
Brown was born on March 10, 1908. He grew up on a small farm in Sharon, Kansas. Brown worked on the farm during the mornings before walking several miles to school in Kiowa, Kansas. He only attended one year of school due to financial reasons.

== Professional wrestling career ==
Brown was noticed by Ernest Brown, a former manager of amateur and professional wrestlers, in the late 1920s, who was convinced that he might have a future as a wrestler and agreed to work with Brown at the local high school in Kiowa, Kansas. After training, Brown was undefeated for 71 matches. He gained enough notoriety in western Kansas that the promoter in Wichita put him on the preliminary of the weekly matches there.

A well-known wrestler named Abe Coleman saw Brown wrestle and recommended him to the promoter in St. Louis, Tom Packs.

Brown impressed many people with his wrestling skills in matches against former world heavyweight champions Jim Londos and Ed "Strangler" Lewis. He quickly won the Kansas Heavyweight Championship. Brown went on to become the Kansas-based Midwest Wrestling Association (MWA) World Heavyweight Champion for a record of 11 times from 1940 to 1948. Brown won the title by beating wrestlers such as Bobby Bruns, Lee Wyckoff, Tom Zaharias, Swedish Angel, Roy Graham and Tug Carlson.

In 1948, promoter Pinkie George, along with other promoters, recognized Brown as the World Heavyweight Champion in the newly formed National Wrestling Alliance (NWA). Brown began the NWA's project of unifying the various world heavyweight championships contested at that time with the NWA version. A significant unification match took place against Frank Sexton on March 15, 1949. Sexton held the American Wrestling Alliance Heavyweight Championship, the second most important championship in the country at that time, which he had previously unified with the Maryland version of the World Heavyweight Championship.

Brown held the World Heavyweight Championship until he was forced to retire in November 1949 due to injuries he suffered on November 1, 1949 in a car accident. He was scheduled to participate in a unification match against Lou Thesz on November 25, 1949. Thesz was awarded the title as Brown was unable to compete.

After retiring, Brown became a promoter in Kansas City, Missouri. He promoted the Midwest Wrestling Association (MWA) from the founding of the NWA in 1948 until 1958, when the promotion was taken over by Bob Geigel.

== Personal life ==
Brown married Grace Charlotte on October 13, 1927. Their marriage lasted until his death in January 1981. Their son Richard also became a wrestler.

== Championships and accomplishments ==
- Cauliflower Alley Club
  - Posthumous Award (2008)
- Midwest Wrestling Association (Ohio)
  - MWA World Heavyweight Championship (Ohio version) (1 time)
- Midwest Wrestling Association
  - MWA World Heavyweight Championship (11 times)
- National Wrestling Alliance
  - NWA World Heavyweight Championship (1 time, inaugural)
- Professional Wrestling Hall of Fame
  - Pioneer Era inductee in 2005
- Other
  - Kansas Heavyweight Championship

== See also ==
- List of professional wrestling promoters
