= Holmes Township =

Holmes Township may refer to the following places in the United States:

- Holmes Township, Michigan
- Holmes Township, Crawford County, Ohio
