= Mark Tendler =

American professional wrestler (1933–1991)

Personal information
- Born: March 4, 1932 The Bronx, New York, U.S.
- Died: February 15, 1990 (aged 57) Stony Brook, New York, U.S.
- Cause of death: Murdered by gunshot

Professional wrestling career
- Billed height: 6 ft 3 in (191 cm)
- Billed weight: 264 lb (120 kg)
- Trained by: George Tragos
- Debut: 1955
- Retired: July 7, 1979

Mark Tendler (March 4, 1932 – February 15, 1990) was an American professional wrestler and actor. He worked for in Hawaii in the late 1950s and the World Wide Wrestling Federation in the 1970s.

== Professional wrestling career ==
Originally a boxer, Tendler made his professional wrestling debut in 1955 in New Jersey after being trained by George Tragos. In 1956, he went to Hawaii to work for 50th State Big Time Wrestling as Prince Charming. In 1959 he went to his hometown of New York City and worked for Capitol Wrestling Corporation. Later that year Tendler took a hiatus from wrestling to focus on his acting career.

In 1974, he came out of retirement and returned to Capitol Wrestling Corporation now renamed the World Wide Wrestling Federation. He worked as a jobber and his biggest victories were a disqualification win over WWE Hall of Famer Johnny Rodz in December 1975 and a pinfall win over Rodz in August 1978. He worked for the WWWF until 1979.

In 1979, he worked for All Japan Pro Wrestling.

His last match was on July 7, 1979, for WWWF now WWF (World Wrestling Federation) when he defeated Tony Altomare in Poughkeepsie, New York. He would retire from wrestling after that match.

== Personal life ==
He was married to wrestler Kitty Adams who worked the WWWF from the mid to late 1970s.

Outside of wrestling during the 1960s he worked as a full-time lingerie salesman.

Tendler trained wrestlers The Sandman, Chris Michaels, Sonny Blaze and Brian Donahue.

== Death ==
On February 13, 1990, Tendler was at the parking lot of the Crazy Clown in Riverhead, New York where he was the manager of the club. He was found shot in the head in his car. He was flown by helicopter to University Hospital in Stony Brook, New York, where he died two days later on the 15th. He was 57. As of September 2023, the killer has not been found.

== Filmography ==
Year	Title	Role	Notes
1970	Hercules In New York	Samson	Film
1973	Badge 373	Harobur Lights Boucher	Film
1979	Night-Flowers	Referee	Film
