= Banat, Michigan =

- Unincorporated community
- Location within the state of Michigan Banat (the United States)
- Coordinates: 45°31′05″N 87°41′49″W
- Country: United States
- State: Michigan
- County: Menominee
- Township: Holmes
- Elevation: 791 ft (241 m)
- Time zone: UTC-6 (Central (CST))
  - Summer (DST): UTC-5 (CDT)
- ZIP code(s): 49821
- Area code: 906
- FIPS code: 26-40600
- GNIS feature ID: 620537

Banat is an unincorporated community in Menominee County, Michigan, and home to Holmes Township's Township Hall. Banat was named after Banat, in Romania (then part of the Austro-Hungarian Empire) by Romanian immigrants who came to the area in the mid 19th century. At Banat's peak, it had a two-room schoolhouse, church, cemetery, bus garage, township hall, tavern, inn, two general stores, gas station and a railroad station. The original industry was farming, though this was largely abandoned by the mid-twentieth century due to poor soil and climate conditions. The permanent population dwindled during the latter half of the twentieth century. The school house was closed and sold in the 1960s and is now a private cottage. The church was closed and demolished in the mid-1980s. The bus garage was sold off along with the school house and was eventually demolished sometime around 2000 to make way for a mini-storage facility. The tavern, general store and gas station were closed and demolished following the death of the last owner, Mr. Hirsch.

There is still a small permanent population, but many former residences are now used recreationally. Outdoor activities such as hunting and fishing are now the primary activities in the area; there is also a cross-country skiing course that opened in the late 1990s. A rental lodge, which recently opened, and a mini-storage facility, built on the site of the former bus garage, are the only apparent businesses within the traditional borders of Banat. With climate change, and the rising price of crops such as soy and corn, there has been a recent resurgence of crop farming in just the past few years, and there is at least one active cattle farm in the area.

With the decline in farming, environmental protection laws of the 1970s, and wildlife reintroduction programs, wildlife has made a remarkable comeback in the area. By the 1970s there were no bald eagles and very few black bear. There are now many nesting pairs of eagles in the area and a healthy bear population, as well as improvements in many other avian and small mammal populations.

== Demographics ==
Banat has a population that is 95.8% Caucasian and 4.2% Other/Mixed Race.

== Notable residents ==
- Lou Thesz, professional wrestling legend
