= Sonny Blaze =

American professional wrestler (born 1964)

Personal information
- Born: Al Schaefer; January 19, 1964 (age 62) Central Islip, New York, U.S.

Professional wrestling career
- Ring name: Sonny Blaze
- Billed height: 5"10
- Billed weight: 233 lb (106 kg)
- Trained by: Mark Tendler
- Debut: 1987
- Retired: 1993

Allan Schaefer (born January 19, 1964) is an American retired professional wrestler, better known as Sonny Blaze. He wrestled for the World Wrestling Federation, and the Universal Wrestling Federation. He was also a pro wrestling trainer whose students included, most notably, Bubba Ray Dudley, Paul Lauria and Mikey Whipwreck.

== Professional wrestling career ==
Blaze made his debut in the World Wrestling Federation in 1990. He had matches against Ted DiBiase, Mr. Perfect, Sgt. Slaughter, Rick Martel, The Undertaker, Big Boss Man and Shawn Michaels. He left the WWF in 1992.

Also worked for the Universal Wrestling Federation in 1991. He would retire from wrestling in 1993.

== Championships and accomplishments ==
- Pro Wrestling Illustrated
  - PWI ranked him # 450 of the 500 best singles wrestlers in the PWI 500 in 1991.
  - PWI ranked him # 477 of the 500 best singles wrestlers in the PWI 500 in 1992.
