= MWA World Heavyweight Championship =

Professional wrestling championship

MWA World Heavyweight Championship (Kansas Version)

Details
- Promotion: Midwest Wrestling Association
- Date established: January 1940
- Date retired: October 1948
Statistics
- First champion: Bobby Bruns
- Most reigns: Orville Brown (11)
- Longest reign: Orville Brown (673 days)
- Shortest reign: Bobby Bruns (5 days)

The MWA World Heavyweight Championship was an American professional wrestling world heavyweight championship in the Kansas City, Kansas-based Midwest Wrestling Association (MWA). It was the direct predecessor of the National Wrestling Alliance (NWA) World Heavyweight Championship, and a successor of sorts to the early world heavyweight championships. The title was created in 1940, and first held by Bobby Bruns that January.

- At an unknown period, Brown won the Kansas Heavyweight Champion and had a match against 4-time World Heavyweight Champion Ed "Strangler" Lewis.
- On November 8, 1933, Brown defeated Chief Chewchki in St. Louis, Missouri in 7 minutes. On April 11 and May 16, 1934, he fought George Zaharias (of Colorado) and "Ray Steele" (Peter Sauer) in the same city to thirty-minute draws.
- On May 29, 1936, Brown was specified by Jim Londos in the Houston Post as the strongest grappler he had ever faced, and that he had wrestled him "a few nights ago" to a two-hour draw in Detroit. On September 21, 1936 Brown was named one of the top twenty contenders for the World’s Heavyweight Championship in Houston, Texas by the members of the National Wrestling Association.
- On June 1, 1937, Bruns unsuccessfully challenged World Champion Everette Marshall at the Public Hall in Cleveland, Ohio. The match ended in 44:48 when Bruns was laid out and unable to recover.
- In September 1937, John Pesek was awarded Londos' National Wrestling Association world title.
- On October 28. 1937, Brown lost an important Columbus, Ohio match to Everette Marshall, the recognized holder of one of the World Championships. It drew 10,000 people, setting a city record. He lost one other, but then managed to tie Marshall in a third match on December 16.
- On January 1, 1938, Brown wrestled Pesek to a 90-minute draw. On August 17, 1938 Pesek was stripped of the NWA world title and immediately awarded the MWA world title (Marshall's old title) instead.
- On November 10, 1939, Bruns defeated Maurice Boyer in Bridgeport, Connecticut for the World Light Heavyweight Championship (the Jack Pfeffer version).

The title lasted until the MWA joined the newly formed NWA in October 1948, with the MWA champion, Orville Brown, recognized as the first NWA World Heavyweight Champion.

== Title history ==
=== MWA World Heavyweight Championship (Kansas) ===
Key

Symbol	Meaning
#	The overall championship reign
Reign	The reign number for the specific set of wrestlers listed.
Event	The event promoted by the respective promotion in which the title changed hands
—	Used for vacated reigns in order to not count it as an official reign

#	Wrestler	Reign	Date	Days held	Location	Event	Notes
1	Bobby Bruns	1	January 18, 1940	147	Kansas City, Kansas	Live event	Defeated fellow contender Orville Brown to win the vacant championship.
2	Orville Brown	1	June 13, 1940	308	Kansas City, Kansas	Live event	
3	Lee Wyckoff	1	April 17, 1941	182	Kansas City, Kansas	Live event	
4	Orville Brown	2	October 16, 1941	140	Kansas City, Kansas	Live event	
5	Tom Zaharias	1	March 5, 1942	112	Kansas City, Kansas	Live event	
6	Orville Brown	3	June 25, 1942	123	Kansas City, Kansas	Live event	Ed Lewis won a disputed decision over Brown on November 5, 1942.
7	Ed "Strangler" Lewis	1	November 26, 1942	80	Kansas City, Kansas	Live event	Defeated Brown in a rematch.
8	Lee Wyckoff	2	January 14, 1943	35	Kansas City, Kansas	Live event	
9	Orville Brown	4	February 18, 1943	(Note: The date the championship was lost has not been documented which means the championship reign lasted anywhere between 102 days and 72 days)	Kansas City, Kansas	Live event	
10	Lee Wyckoff	3	May 1943	(Note: The date the championship was won has not been documented which means the championship reign lasted anywhere between 17 days and 47 days)	Great Bend, Kansas	Live event	
11	Orville Brown	5	June 17, 1943	169	Kansas City, Kansas	Live event	
12	The Swedish Angel	1	December 3, 1943	6	Kansas City, Kansas	Live event	
13	Orville Brown	6	December 9, 1943	147	Kansas City, Kansas	Live event	Dave Levin defeated Brown in a one-fall match on April 27, 1944 in Kansas City, Kansas, and laid claim to the title. However, Brown claimed that the title could only change hands in a two-out-of-three falls match.
14	Dave Levin	1	May 4, 1944	56		Live event	Defeated Brown in a rematch.
15	Lee Wyckoff	4	June 29, 1944	48	Topeka, Kansas	Live event	
16	Orville Brown	7	August 16, 1944	673	Topeka, Kansas	Live event	
17	Bobby Bruns	2	June 20, 1946	49	Kansas City, Kansas	Live event	
18	Orville Brown	8	August 8, 1946	218	Kansas City, Kansas	Live event	
19	Vic Christy	1	March 14, 1947	16	St. Joseph, Missouri	Live event	
20	Roy Graham	1	March 30, 1947	11	St. Joseph, Missouri	Live event	
21	Orville Brown	9	April 10, 1947	253	Kansas City, Kansas	Live event	
22	Tug Carlson	1	December 19, 1947	7	St. Joseph, Missouri	Live event	
23	Orville Brown	10	December 26, 1947	125	St. Joseph, Missouri	Live event	
24	Bobby Bruns	3	April 29, 1948	5	Kansas City, Kansas	Live event	Won the title by disqualification.
25	Orville Brown	11	May 4, 1948	(Note: The date the championship was won has not been documented which means the championship reign lasted anywhere between 150 days and 180 days)	Kansas City, Kansas	Live event	
The title was retired after the MWA joined the National Wrestling Alliance in October 1948, and Brown was recognized as its first champion.

== Reigns by combined length ==
Key

Symbol	Meaning
¤	The exact length of at least one title reign is uncertain, so the shortest possible length is used.

Rank	Wrestler	# of reigns	Combined days
1	Orville Brown	11	2,409¤
2	Lee Wyckoff	4	282¤
3	Bobby Bruns	3	201
4	Tom Zaharias	1	112
5	Ed Lewis	1	80
6	Dave Levin	1	56
7	Vic Christy	1	16
8	Roy Graham	1	11
9	Tug Carlson	1	7
10	The Swedish Angel	1	6

=== Splinter titles ===
==== MWA World Heavyweight Championship (Ohio) ====
Key
No.	Overall reign number
Reign	Reign number for the specific champion
Days	Number of days held

No.	Champion	Championship change			Reign statistics		Notes	Ref.
No.	Champion	Date	Event	Location	Reign	Days	Notes	Ref.
1	John Pesek	March 26, 1931	Live event	Columbus, Ohio	1	647	Starts the claimed when World Champion Gus Sonnenberg ignores his challenge, defeated Marin Plestina to be officially recognized by MWA.	
—	Vacated	1933	—	—	—	—	Stripped the title when Pesek starts wrestling for Jim Londos group.	
2	Everett Marshall	June 29, 1936	N/A	Columbus, Ohio	1	548	Recognized by MWA when defeated Ali Baba for the World Heavyweight Championship. Retroactively recognized by the National Wrestling Alliance as the real World champion.	
3	Lou Thesz	December 29, 1937	N/A	St. Louis, Missouri	1	44	Also recognized World Champion by the American Wrestling Association (Boston). Retroactively recognized by the National Wrestling Alliance as the real World champion.	
3	Steve Casey	February 11, 1938	N/A	Boston, Massachusetts	1	231	Recognized by MWA and AWA, both belts are presented to him. Retroactively recognized by the National Wrestling Alliance as the real World champion. Retroactive Alliance recognition switched to NWA World Heavyweight Championship when Casey left the country in September 1938.	
—	Vacated	September 1938	—	—	—	—	Recognition withdrawn by MWA when he left the country..	
4	John Pesek	October 17, 1938	N/A	Columbus, Ohio	2	613	Awarded by MWA when NWA recognize Everett Marshall as the World Champion.	
—	Vacated	June 21, 1940	—	—	—	—	Vacated due to Pesek's inactivity.	
6	Orville Brown	June 27, 1940	N/A	Columbus, Ohio	1	889	Current World Champion in Kansas, defeated Dick Shikat for the vacant title.	
7	Ed Lewis	December 3, 1942	N/A	Columbus, Ohio	1	56	Current World Champion in Kansas.	
8	John Pesek	January 28, 1943	N/A	Columbus, Ohio	3	2,165		
—	Vacated	1949	—	—	—	—	Vacated due to Pesek's inactivity.	
10	Don Eagle	May 5, 1950	N/A	Cleveland, Ohio	1	0	Defeated Frank Sexton for the AWA World Heavyweight Championship version in Ohio.	
—	Deactivated	May 5, 1950	—	—	—	—	lineage continued under AWA World Heavyweight Championship version in Ohio.	

== See also ==
- Heart of America Sports Attractions
- National Wrestling Alliance
- NWA World Heavyweight Championship
- List of early world heavyweight champions in professional wrestling
