= George Tragos =

Greek-born American wrestler

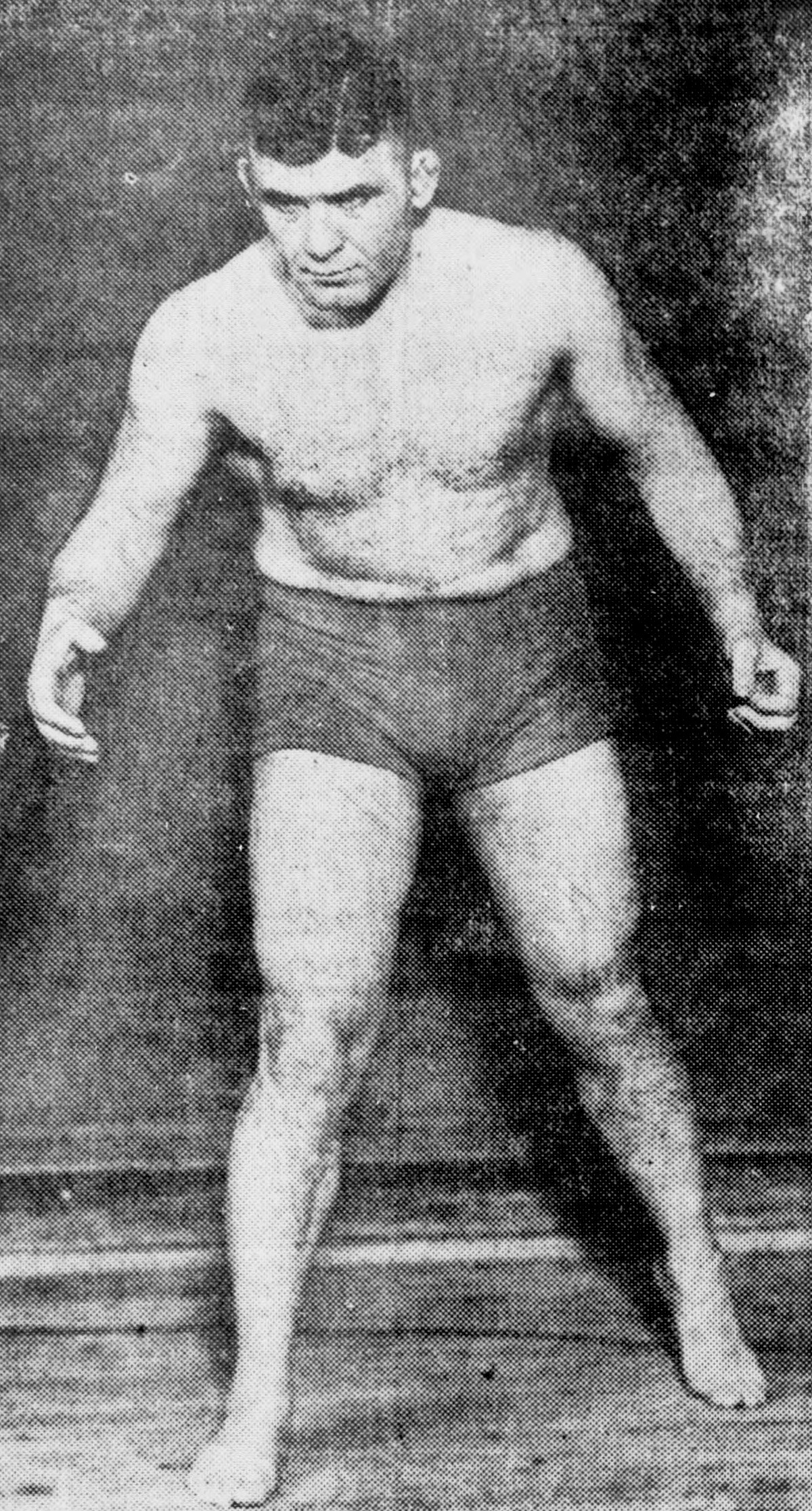

Personal information
- Born: March 14, 1897 Kingdom of Greece
- Died: July 5, 1955 (aged 58) St. Louis, Missouri, U.S.

Professional wrestling career
- Billed height: 5 ft 9 in (1.75 m)
- Billed weight: 215 lb (98 kg)
- Billed from: St. Louis, Missouri
- Debut: 1922

George Tragos (Greek: Γεώργιος Τράγος; 14 March 1897 – 5 September 1955) was a Greek-American amateur wrestler, professional wrestler and wrestling coach. Tragos notably trained three-time NWA World Heavyweight Champion Lou Thesz, and the George Tragos/Lou Thesz Professional Wrestling Hall of Fame is named in their honor.

== Biography ==
Tragos emigrated from Greece to the United States in 1910. In 1922, he became an amateur catch wrestling coach at the University of Missouri at Columbia and began wrestling professionally. He wrestled in St. Louis for most of his career where he became a professional middleweight champion. However, the heavyweight division was considered the top-tier attraction and thus Tragos never gained much popularity due to his smaller size.

Tragos had a vicious reputation as a wrestler, often deliberately injuring his opponents. Lou Thesz, who trained under Tragos, was warned by his friends to not train with Tragos as Tragos might injure him over a slight. Thesz was careful to always show Tragos the utmost respect befitting a top-tier grappler and so was never harmed. But Thesz did observe Tragos maim numerous people over insults. In one instance, a professional wrestling promoter ordered him to lose to an opponent. This was normal in professional wrestling, as even back then it was effectively theatre. But the wrestlers who performed in this theatre usually had training in real wrestling, and professional wrestling attempted to maintain credibility during this period (kayfabe). Tragos considered his opponent, whom Thesz later learned was a good amateur wrestler, to be an inferior wrestler and so felt insulted by the order to throw the match. Tragos took vicarious revenge upon his opponent by maiming his opponent's arm using a dangerous double wristlock maneuver. There was so much internal damage that the arm eventually became gangrenous and had to be amputated. Tragos expressed no remorse, dismissing the incident as simply part of the sport.

== Championships and accomplishments ==
- Missouri Wrestling Club
  - Missouri Heavyweight Title (1 time)
- Other titles
  - World Middleweight Champion (1 time)
- George Tragos/Lou Thesz Professional Wrestling Hall of Fame
  - Class of 1999
