= Bobby Bruns =

American professional wrestler (1914–1983)

Robert H. Bruns (July 12, 1914 – January 23, 1983), known by his ring name Bobby Bruns, was an American professional wrestler and trainer.

== Career ==
Bruns made his debut during the 1930s, primarily wrestling in the Midwestern United States. During the 1950s, he made appearances for the Japan Pro Wrestling Alliance, Mid Pacific Promotions, Sam Muchnick Sports Attractions, and the National Wrestling Alliance (NWA). In 1951, he became the debut opponent of Rikidozan, the man who built professional wrestling in Japan into a viable spectator sport.

== Championships and accomplishments ==
- Midwest Wrestling Association
  - MWA World Heavyweight Championship (3 times)
- NWA Hawaii
  - NWA Hawaii Tag Team Championship (5 times) – with Lucky Simunovich (2 times), Bobby Managoff (1 time), Luther Lindsay (1 time), John Paul Henning (1 time)
  - NWA Hawaii Heavyweight Championship (1 time)
- NWA Chicago
  - NWA Chicago World Tag Team Championship (1 time, with Roy McClarty)
- Wrestling Observer Newsletter
  - Wrestling Observer Newsletter Hall of Fame (class of 2025)
