= Ed Lewis (wrestler) =

American professional wrestler (1891–1966)

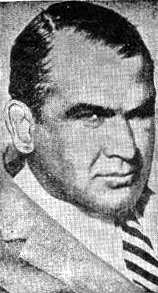
- Lewis in 1947

Personal information
- Born: Robert Herman Julius Friedrich; June 30, 1891 Nekoosa, Wisconsin, U.S.
- Died: August 8, 1966 (aged 75) Tulsa, Oklahoma, U.S.

Professional wrestling career
- Ring name(s): Ed Lewis; Rob Friedrich; The Strangler
- Billed height: 5 ft 10 in (178 cm)
- Billed weight: 265 lb (120 kg)
- Debut: 1905
- Retired: 1948

Robert Herman Julius Friedrich (June 30, 1891 – August 8, 1966), better known by the ring name Ed "Strangler" Lewis, was an American professional wrestler and trainer. During his wrestling career, which spanned four decades, Lewis was a four-time World Heavyweight Wrestling Champion and overall recognized officially as a five-time world champion. Considered to be one of the most iconic and recognizable sports stars of the 1920s, often alongside boxer Jack Dempsey and baseball player Babe Ruth, Lewis notably wrestled in over 6,000 matches (many of which were real contests) and lost only 32 of them.

He was posthumously inducted as a charter member into the following halls of fame: Wrestling Observer Newsletter, Professional Wrestling, George Tragos/Lou Thesz and WWE's Legacy Wing. One of the most legitimately feared grapplers of all time, Lewis was known for his catch wrestling prowess and trained many future champions, most notably Lou Thesz, Danny Hodge, Dick Hutton and Gene LeBell.

== Professional wrestling career ==
Born in Nekoosa, Wisconsin, to German parents, Friedrich was an active youngster, participating in amateur wrestling, basketball and track. Friedrich would end up solely focusing on wrestling, finding success competing in local competitions against other farmers. Friedrich began wrestling professionally at the age of 14, using the ring name Ed "Strangler" Lewis, first in Louisville, Kentucky, partly in tribute of 1890s star Evan "Strangler" Lewis and so his parents wouldn't discover it was him.

During World War I, Lewis enlisted as a Sergeant in the 13th Company, 161st Depot Brigade, and helped train soldiers in physical conditioning and hand-to-hand combat. In the A&E documentary The Unreal Story of Professional Wrestling, it was stated that he was dubbed the Strangler after a match in France where he applied a sleeper hold, and the French, who were unfamiliar with the hold, thought he was strangling his opponent.

He was the pivotal figure in the "Gold Dust Trio", along with promoters Toots Mondt and Big Billy Sandow, a travelling road show that was the precursor to wrestling tours, and which revolutionized professional wrestling by creating undercards, promoting full events instead of one match shows. They also developed the first professional wrestling storylines, creating worked feuds between wrestlers. Because of the legit skills Lewis possessed, the Trio could put the title on whoever they wanted, because Lewis had the ability to defeat anyone who would not follow the script.

Lewis captured his first recognized World Heavyweight Wrestling Championship on December 13, 1920, defeating Joe Stecher. Stecher would prove to be Lewis' biggest rival, both in and out of the ring, with Stecher running his own shows against the Gold Dust Trio, beginning quite possibly the first promotional rivalry. Lewis and Stecher wrestled one of the longest matches in professional wrestling history, where they battled for five and a half hours, ending in a draw.

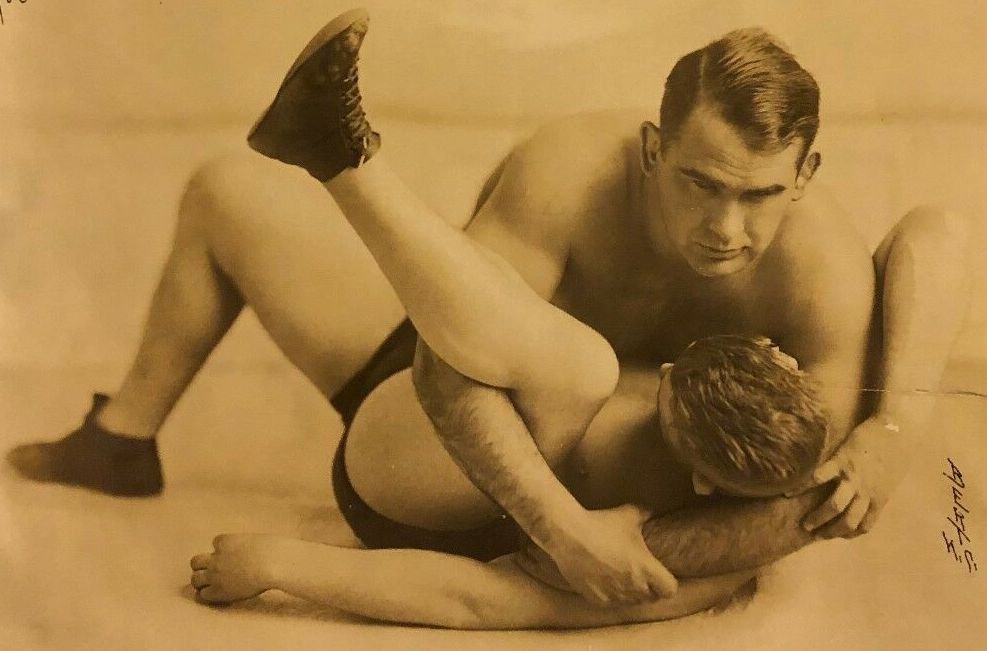
Lewis pins an opponent, 1929

The climax of their feud came on April 15, 1925, when Gold Dust Trio star and former champion Stanislaus Zbyszko was asked to lose to the Gold Dust Trio's own handpicked champion, Wayne Munn, a former football star, in an effort to give Munn credibility. Zbyszko balked at the idea of losing to an unskilled wrestler, and secretly jumped to the Joe Stecher camp. Zbyszko double-crossed the Gold Dust Trio, using his knowledge of holds to legit defeat and, in the process, humiliate Munn. Eventually, Lewis and Stecher settled their differences, and agreed to do business with each other, with Stecher dropping the world title back to Lewis on February 20, 1928.

In 1931, Lewis and partner, Billy Sandow, signed former Notre Dame All-American running back "Jumping Joe" Savoldi to his first professional wrestling contract. Lewis was credited with training Savoldi in Los Angeles during the first half of 1931. After winning the AWA World Heavyweight Championship in April 1931, he faced Henri Deglane in May for a title defense in Montreal in a two-out-of-three falls match. After two falls, Deglane had feigned being bitten by Lewis, when in reality he had been bitten in the locker room. This led to Deglane being awarded the title via disqualification and a dispute over who was actually acknowledged as champion over the next two years.

In 1933, one of the Strangler's most infamous matches took place in Madison Square Garden. He was fighting Ray Steele for the title. The two men began circling each other, but no fighting happened, which made the fans bored. Steele ended the match by punching Lewis, causing the referee to disqualify him twenty minutes into the match.

On September 20, 1934, Lewis wrestled Jim Londos in front of an audience of 35,275 at Wrigley Field, and drawing a record gate of $96,302, which would stand until 1952.

In 1937, the Strangler had six contests in New Zealand. He beat Floyd Marshall, John Spellman, Glen Wade and Rusty Wescoatt, and lost twice to the Canadian champion Earl McCready, who was then established as the top wrestler in New Zealand. In 1936, he competed in one of the last known legitimate contests in professional wrestling, where he wrestled Lee Wykoff. Lewis separated a clavicle during training but decided to go ahead with the contest. The match ended in a draw.

== Post wrestling ==
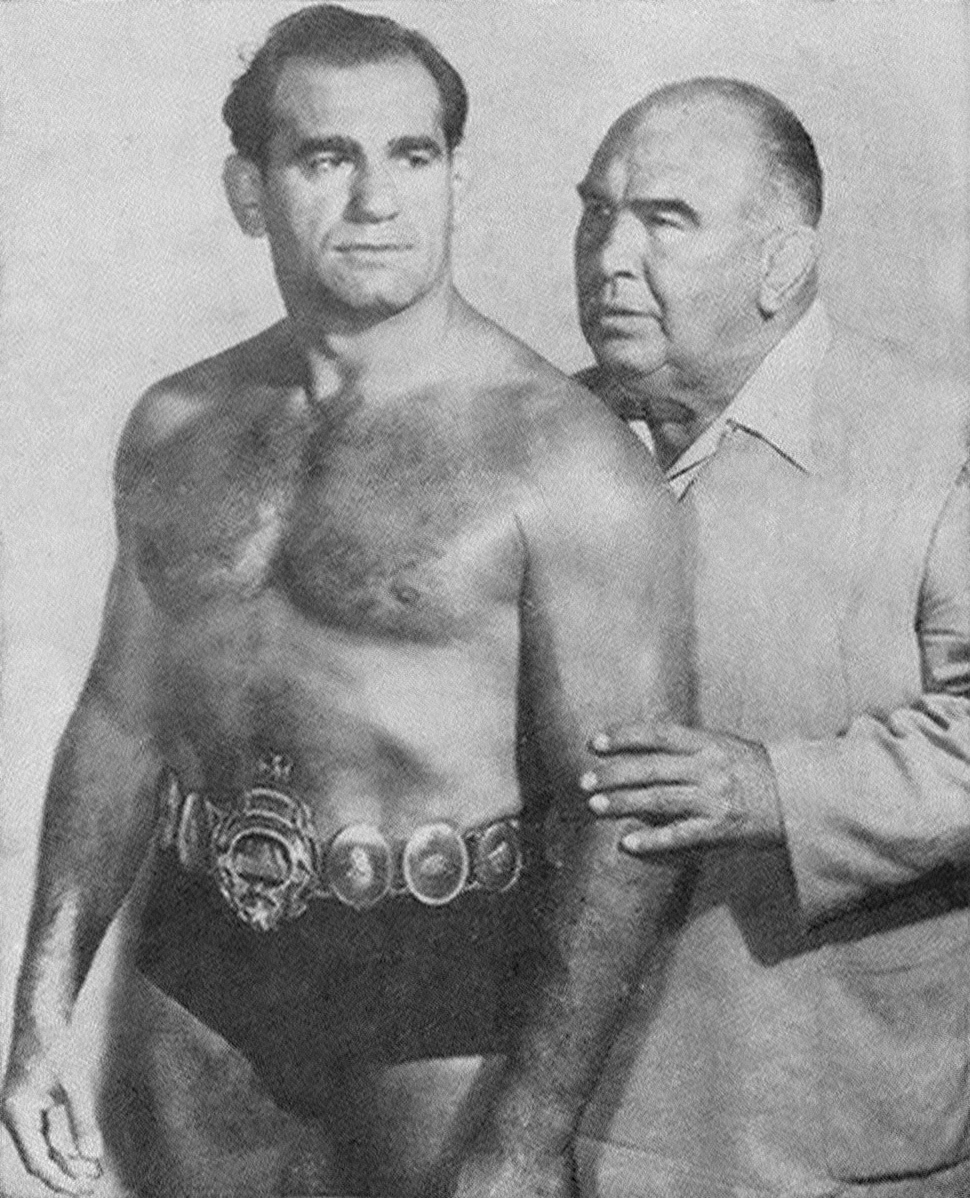
Lewis managing Lou Thesz in the 1950s

Lewis went into semi-retirement in 1935, but came out of retirement in 1942, at the age of 51, despite being legally blind. He retired from professional wrestling for good in 1948, at 57 years old. At the November 1949 NWA Convention in St. Louis, Lewis was named the ambassador of good will for the NWA. In later years, he became the manager of his good friend and reigning NWA World Heavyweight Champion, Lou Thesz.

Lewis went blind from trachoma. He was destitute and relied on his wife and acquaintances to survive. He died in Oklahoma on August 8, 1966, at the age of 75.

In 1999, Lewis was inducted into the George Tragos/Lou Thesz Hall of Fame. Today, a Wisconsin state historical marker commemorates his achievements in his hometown of Nekoosa on Prospect Avenue. In 2002, Lewis was voted in by professional wrestlers, historians and writers and inducted into the Professional Wrestling Hall of Fame in Amsterdam, New York.

== Filmography ==
=== Films ===
Year	Film	Role	Notes
1929	Lewis-Sonnenberg Wrestling Match	Himself	Short film
1934	The President Vanishes	Legislator	
1942	Gentleman Jim	Hoghead	Uncredited
1943	That Nazty Nuisance	Paj Mab's Guard	Uncredited
1949	Bodyhold	Referee	Uncredited

== Championships and accomplishments ==
- American Wrestling Association (Boston)
  - AWA World Heavyweight Championship (2 times)
- Championship Wrestling from Florida
  - NWA Florida Heavyweight Championship (1 time)
- George Tragos/Lou Thesz Professional Wrestling Hall of Fame
  - Class of 1999
- International Professional Wrestling Hall of Fame
  - Class of 2021
- Midwest Wrestling Association (Kansas City)
  - MWA World Heavyweight Championship (1 time)
- Midwest Wrestling Association (Ohio)
  - MWA World Heavyweight Championship (Ohio version) (1 time)
- New York State Athletic Commission
  - NYSAC World Heavyweight Championship (1 time)
- Professional Wrestling Hall of Fame and Museum
  - Class of 2002
- WWE
  - WWE Hall of Fame (Class of 2016)
- Wrestling Observer Newsletter
  - Wrestling Observer Newsletter Hall of Fame (Class of 1996)
- Other titles
  - World Heavyweight Championship (Michigan/Illinois version) (1 time)
  - World Heavyweight Wrestling Championship (4 times)
  - The musical The Music Man mentions the exciting contest between Strangler Lewis and Frank Gotch
