= Holmes Township, Michigan =

- Civil township
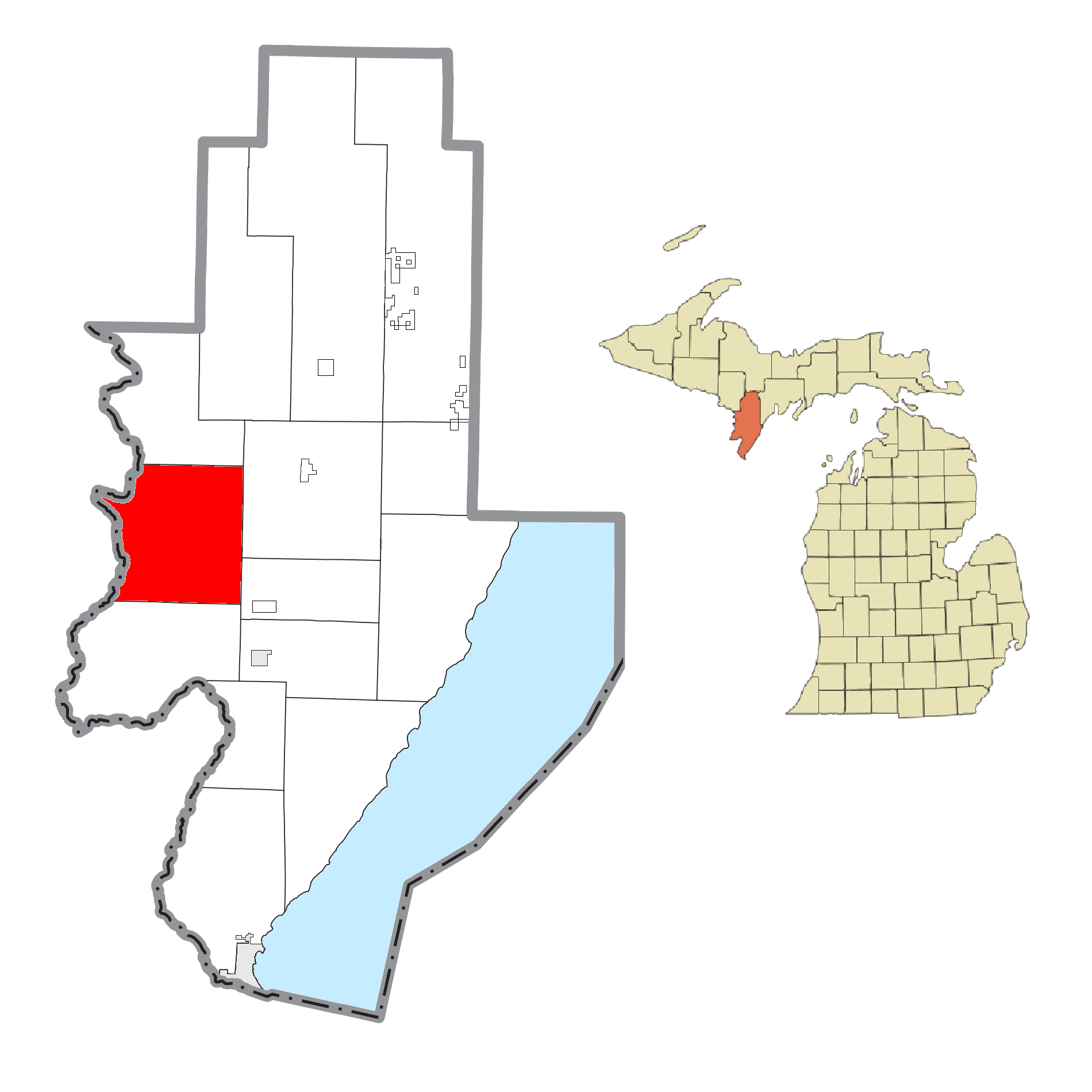
- Location within Menominee County and the state of Michigan

- Location within Michigan Location within the United States
- Coordinates: 45°30′53″N 87°43′51″W
- Country: United States
- State: Michigan
- County: Menominee

Area
  - Total: 72.44 sq mi (187.6 km^{2})
  - Land: 71.37 sq mi (184.8 km^{2})
  - Water: 1.07 sq mi (2.8 km^{2})
- Elevation: 764 ft (233 m)

Population (2020)
  - Total: 341
  - Density: 4.8/sq mi (1.9/km^{2})
- Time zone: UTC-6 (Central (CST))
  - Summer (DST): UTC-5 (CDT)
- ZIP Codes: 49821 (Daggett); 49887 (Stepheson)
- Area code: 906
- FIPS code: 26-109-38760
- GNIS feature ID: 1626481

Holmes Township is a civil township of Menominee County in the U.S. state of Michigan. The population was 341 at the 2020 census.

== Geography ==
The township is in western Menominee County and is bordered to the west, across the Menominee River, by Marinette County in Wisconsin. Menominee, the county seat, is 32 miles (51 km) to the south.

According to the United States Census Bureau, Holmes Township has a total area of 72.4 square miles (188 km^{2}), of which 71.4 square miles (185 km^{2}) are land and 1.1 square miles (2.8 km^{2}), or 1.47%, are water. The township is drained by the Menominee River, which flows south along the township's western boundary toward Lake Michigan.

== Demographics ==
As of the census of 2000, there were 296 people, 130 households, and 89 families residing in the township. In 2020, there were 341 people in the township.
