= Heart of America Sports Attractions =

Professional wrestling promotion from 1948 to 1989

- Acronym: CSW
- Founded: July 1948
- Defunct: 1989
- Style: American wrestling
- Headquarters: Kansas City, Missouri
- Founder: Orville Brown
- Owner(s): Orville Brown (1948–63); Bob Geigel (1963–86, 1987–89); Jim Crockett, Jr. (1986–87)
- Parent: WWE Libraries (WWE)
- Sister: St. Louis Wrestling Club
- Formerly: Central States Wrestling

Heart of America Sports Attractions, Inc., operating as the Midwest Wrestling Association, Central States Wrestling and the World Wrestling Alliance, was an American professional wrestling promotion that ran shows mainly in Kansas, Missouri, Nebraska and Iowa. Due to the promotion's main office and base of operations being in Kansas City, Missouri the territory was often referred to simply as "Kansas City". The promotion existed from July 1948 until it closed in 1989. The territory was one of the original territories of the National Wrestling Alliance with two of the six "founding fathers" of the NWA (Paul "Pinkie" George and Orville Brown) promoting in it.

== History ==
=== Midwest Wrestling Association ===
Originally known as the "Midwest Wrestling Association" before the formation of the National Wrestling Alliance it controlled and booked shows territories in Kansas, Missouri, Nebraska and Iowa and was seen as a cornerstone of the NWA. It joined the NWA in October 1948. The territory was promoted by Pinkie George and the first official NWA World Heavyweight Champion Orville Brown (Sonny Myers being the preceding unofficial one) from the creation of the NWA until 1958.

The MWA World Heavyweight Championship began in 1940, preceding the consolidation with the CSW and WWA.

=== Heart of America Sports Attractions forms ===
In 1963, wrestler/promoter Bob Geigel took over and partnered up with Pat O'Conner and promoters George Simpson and Gust Karras to form "Heart of America Sports Attractions, Inc." The promotion continued to be a cornerstone of the NWA with Geigel sitting on the board of directors and even served as president of the National Wrestling Alliance (in rotation with Jim Crockett Jr.) from 1978 until 1987, the period that is considered the last "glory years" of the NWA. Central States Wrestling did not become a household name across the United States until 1973, when Harley Race brought attention to CSW (and its "sister promotion" the St. Louis Wrestling Club) by winning the NWA World Heavyweight Title for the first time.

=== Under Jim Crockett Promotions ===
In 1986, Geigel sold the promotion to Jim Crockett Promotions owner Jim Crockett, Jr., who ran the territory from September 1986 until February 1987, where Bob Geigel bought the promotion back and co partnered with George Petraski.

=== World Wrestling Alliance ===
After stepping down as president of the NWA, Geigel withdrew his promotion from the NWA in late 1987 and formed a new sanctioning body known as the "World Wrestling Alliance" in an attempt to compete with the national expansion of Jim Crockett and Vince McMahon. The move did not pay off and Geigel closed the WWA in 1989.

== Central-States Championship Wrestling ==
The NWA Central States Heavyweight Championship is currently controlled by the NWA affiliate Central-States Championship Wrestling (CCW).

== Tape library ==
The promotion's classic tape library is currently owned by Justin Race, son of Harley Race. As of 2024, Race has been distributing the footage through platforms such as The Savoldi Family's Ultimate Classic Wrestling Network and Joe Dombrowski's Pro Wrestling Library.

== Championships ==
Championship:	Last Champion(s):	Active From:	Active Until:	Notes:
MWA World Heavyweight Championship	Orville Brown	January 1940	October 1948	The top promotional title of the Midwest Wrestling Association first won by Bobby Bruns, retired when the MWA joined the National Wrestling Alliance with Brown as the first champion.
NWA World Heavyweight Championship	Still active	July 1948	Present	As a member of the NWA, the NWA World title was recognized as the top title in the promotion.
NWA Central States Heavyweight Championship	Still active	May 18, 1950	Present	The top promotional title of Central States Wrestling, until 1988. Since 2013 the Central States title is the main title in Central-States Championship Wrestling & in the Midwest wrestling scene
NWA Central States Tag Team Championship	Rick Patterson and Steve Ray	February 26, 1971	April 1988	Was briefly promoted in 1961 but not used regularly until it replaced the Central States version of the NWA World Tag Team championship in 1979 as the main tag team title of the promotion
NWA Central States Television Championship	Masahiro Chono	1977	1988	
NWA Missouri Heavyweight Championship	Harley Race	September 16, 1972	February 1986	The top promotional title of sister promotion St. Louis Wrestling Club recognized in Kansas City as well
NWA North American Tag Team Championship (Central States version)	Great Togo and Tokyo Joe	December 19, 1963	1973	During their run with the titles Great Togo and Tokyo Joe were "upgraded" to the Central States version of the NWA World Tag Team Championship
NWA United States Heavyweight Championship (Central States version)	Eddie Sharkey	August 24, 1961	September 1968	
NWA World Tag Team Championship (Central States version)	Bob Brown and Bob Sweetan	June 1958	1979	The Central States version of the World Tag Team Championship was abandoned twice between 1960 and 1973
WWA World Heavyweight Championship	Mike George	January 1988	1989	

== See also ==
- List of National Wrestling Alliance territories
- List of independent wrestling promotions in the United States
