= Bud Taylor =

American boxer (1903–1962)

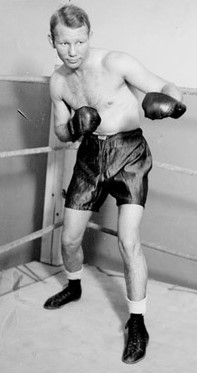
- Taylor in 1929

Personal information
- Nicknames: Blonde Terror of Terre Haute; Terre Haute Terrier
- Nationality: American
- Born: Charles Bernard Taylor; July 22, 1903 Terre Haute, Indiana, United States
- Died: March 6, 1962 (aged 58)
- Weight: Bantamweight

Boxing career
- Stance: Orthodox

Boxing record
- Total fights: 164; with the inclusion of newspaper decisions
- Wins: 116
- Win by KO: 37
- Losses: 32
- Draws: 16

Charles Bernard "Bud" Taylor (July 22, 1903 – March 6, 1962) was an American boxer from Terre Haute, Indiana. Nicknamed the "Blonde Terror of Terre Haute", he held the National Boxing Association (NBA) World Bantamweight Championship during his career in 1927. The Ring Magazine founder Nat Fleischer rated him as the #5 best bantamweight of all time. Taylor was inducted into the Ring Magazine Hall of Fame in 1986 and the International Boxing Hall of Fame in 2005. Taylor was trained for much of his career by former light heavyweight fighter, Mark "The Flurry" Feider.

Taylor was responsible for two in ring deaths during his career in bouts against Inocencio "Clever Sencio" Moldes and Frankie Jerome.

== Pro boxing career ==
=== Tetralogy vs. Memphis Pal Moore ===
Bud fought prolific pugilist Memphis Pal Moore four times. Moore defeated Taylor in their first two encounters, both of which took place in Illinois. Their third fight was declared a draw, and in their last meeting, Taylor was finally able to achieve victory by decision. All of their bouts were decided by newspaper decision, with the official verdict being a "no-decision" at the time.

=== Trilogy vs. Pancho Villa ===
Taylor squared off against the great Pinoy boxer Pancho Villa in three fights, with the initial bout taking place three months after Villa had dethroned Jimmy Wilde to become the World Flyweight Champion. Taylor lost the first fight by decision in Chicago, later exacting revenge during the rematch in Milwaukee via newspaper decision. The rubber match was awarded to Villa, again by points decision.

He also fought Bushy Graham in two fights. In the first fight he beat Bushy by decision in Illinois. The second fight Taylor lost to Bushy by decision in Long Island City.

=== Trilogy vs. Jimmy McLarnin ===
In yet another multi-bout series against a future Hall of Famer, Taylor faced Jimmy McLarnin three times. He bested McLarnin in two out of three encounters via points victories, with a loss by disqualification sandwiched in between. McLarnin would later go on to become the World Welterweight Champion.

=== Trilogy vs. Tony Canzoneri and NBA bantamweight title ===
On March 26, 1927, he fought Tony Canzoneri for the vacant NBA bantamweight title. However, the fight went to a draw, and thus promoter Jim Mullen retained the $4,000 diamond-studded championship belt. Taylor again fought for the title against Canzoneri in a rematch on June 24, 1927, this time winning a unanimous decision at Wrigley Field. He fought Canzoneri one more time at Madison Square Garden, where he lost by decision in a non-title fight.

Taylor held the NBA bantamweight title until May 18, 1928, when the NBA stripped him of it after he had begun fighting in the heavier, featherweight class.

== Professional boxing record ==
All information in this section is derived from BoxRec, unless otherwise stated.

=== Official record ===
164 fights	70 wins	22 losses
By knockout	37	4
By decision	32	15
By disqualification	1	3
Draws	8	
Newspaper decisions/draws	64	

All newspaper decisions are officially regarded as “no decision” bouts and are not counted in the win/loss/draw column.

No.	Result	Record	Opponent	Type	Round	Date	Age	Location	Notes
164	Loss	70–22–8 (64)	Lew Massey	DQ	8 (10)	Mar 16, 1931	27 years, 237 days	Arena, Philadelphia, Pennsylvania, U.S.	Taylor DQ'd for "not trying"
163	Loss	70–21–8 (64)	Benny Bass	TKO	2 (10)	Feb 16, 1931	27 years, 209 days	Arena, Philadelphia, Pennsylvania, U.S.	
162	Win	70–20–8 (64)	Sammy Hackett	KO	3 (10)	Jan 30, 1931	27 years, 192 days	Broadway Auditorium, Buffalo, New York, U.S.	
161	Win	69–20–8 (64)	Joe Lucas	NWS	10	Jan 13, 1931	27 years, 175 days	Armory, Indianapolis, Indiana, U.S.	
160	Loss	69–20–8 (63)	Fidel LaBarba	PTS	10	Nov 28, 1930	27 years, 129 days	Madison Square Garden, New York City, New York, U.S.	
159	Loss	69–19–8 (63)	Maurice Holtzer	PTS	10	Nov 10, 1930	27 years, 111 days	Olympic Auditorium, Los Angeles, California, U.S.	
158	Draw	69–18–8 (63)	Santiago Zorrilla	PTS	8	Oct 21, 1930	27 years, 91 days	Crystal Pool, Seattle, Washington, U.S.	
157	Win	69–18–7 (63)	Eddie Edelman	PTS	6	Oct 14, 1930	27 years, 84 days	Post Street Theater, Spokane, Washington, U.S.	
156	Loss	68–18–7 (63)	Christopher Battalino	PTS	10	Aug 18, 1930	27 years, 27 days	Hurley Stadium, East Hartford, Connecticut, U.S.	
155	Win	68–17–7 (63)	Mickey Genaro	NWS	10	Jul 29, 1930	27 years, 7 days	Fort Benjamin Harrison, Lawrence, Indiana, U.S.	
154	Loss	68–17–7 (62)	Earl Mastro	PTS	10	Jul 1, 1930	26 years, 344 days	Michigan State Fairgrounds, Detroit, Michigan, U.S.	
153	Win	68–16–7 (62)	Johnny Kaiser	TKO	3 (10)	Jun 12, 1930	26 years, 325 days	Reservoir Park, Springfield, Illinois, U.S.	
152	Win	67–16–7 (62)	Jackie Johnston	KO	2 (10)	Jun 3, 1930	26 years, 316 days	Congress Outdoor Stadium, Chicago, Illinois, U.S.	
151	Loss	66–16–7 (62)	Fidel LaBarba	PTS	10	Apr 21, 1930	26 years, 273 days	Coliseum, Chicago, Illinois, U.S.	
150	Win	66–15–7 (62)	Paul Wangley	KO	5 (10)	Apr 11, 1930	26 years, 263 days	Auditorium, Minneapolis, Minnesota, U.S.	
149	Win	65–15–7 (62)	Christopher Battalino	PTS	10	Mar 20, 1930	26 years, 241 days	Olympia Stadium, Detroit, Michigan, U.S.	
148	Loss	64–15–7 (62)	Earl Mastro	TKO	9 (10)	Dec 27, 1929	26 years, 158 days	Chicago Stadium, Chicago, Illinois, U.S.	
147	Win	64–14–7 (62)	Santiago Zorrilla	UD	10	Nov 15, 1929	26 years, 116 days	Coliseum, Chicago, Illinois, U.S.	
146	Draw	63–14–7 (62)	Earl Mastro	PTS	10	Oct 8, 1929	26 years, 78 days	Chicago Stadium, Chicago, Illinois, U.S.	
145	Win	63–14–6 (62)	Orlando Martinez	KO	4 (10)	Sep 20, 1929	26 years, 60 days	Coliseum, Evansville, Indiana, U.S.	
144	Loss	62–14–6 (62)	Andy Martin	PTS	10	Jul 22, 1929	26 years, 0 days	Boston Garden, Boston, Massachusetts, U.S.	
143	Draw	62–13–6 (62)	Goldie Hess	PTS	10	Jun 11, 1929	25 years, 324 days	Olympic Auditorium, Los Angeles, California, U.S.	
142	Win	62–13–5 (62)	Tommy Murray	KO	2 (10)	Apr 16, 1929	25 years, 268 days	Armory, Indianapolis, Indiana, U.S.	
141	Loss	61–13–5 (62)	Young Montreal	PTS	10	Apr 10, 1929	25 years, 262 days	Rhode Island Auditorium, Providence, Rhode Island, U.S.	
140	Win	61–12–5 (62)	Henry Falegano	NWS	8	Apr 2, 1929	25 years, 254 days	Arcadia Ballroom, Milwaukee, Wisconsin, U.S.	
139	Loss	61–12–5 (61)	Al Singer	PTS	10	Mar 15, 1929	25 years, 236 days	Madison Square Garden, New York City, New York, U.S.	
138	Loss	61–11–5 (61)	Al Singer	DQ	4 (10)	Feb 8, 1929	25 years, 201 days	Madison Square Garden, New York City, New York, U.S.	
137	Win	61–10–5 (61)	Bobby Dempsey	KO	4 (10)	Jan 31, 1929	25 years, 193 days	Coliseum, Davenport, Iowa, U.S.	
136	Win	60–10–5 (61)	Billy Shaw	NWS	10	Jan 29, 1929	25 years, 191 days	Armory, Indianapolis, Indiana, U.S.	
135	Loss	60–10–5 (60)	Santiago Zorrilla	PTS	10	Jul 27, 1928	25 years, 5 days	Dreamland Auditorium, San Francisco, California, U.S.	
134	Win	60–9–5 (60)	Johnny Vacca	PTS	10	Jul 10, 1928	24 years, 354 days	Olympic Auditorium, Los Angeles, California, U.S.	
133	Win	59–9–5 (60)	Santiago Zorrilla	PTS	10	Jun 29, 1928	24 years, 343 days	Dreamland Auditorium, San Francisco, California, U.S.	
132	Win	58–9–5 (60)	Joe Lucas	PTS	10	May 21, 1928	24 years, 304 days	White City Arena, Chicago, Illinois, U.S.	
131	Win	57–9–5 (60)	Santiago Zorrilla	PTS	10	Apr 3, 1928	24 years, 256 days	Olympic Auditorium, Los Angeles, California, U.S.	
130	Loss	56–9–5 (60)	Vic Foley	UD	10	Mar 23, 1928	24 years, 245 days	Arena, Vancouver, British Columbia, Canada	
129	Win	56–8–5 (60)	Ignacio Fernandez	PTS	10	Mar 6, 1928	24 years, 228 days	Olympic Auditorium, Los Angeles, California, U.S.	
128	Loss	55–8–5 (60)	Joey Sangor	TKO	7 (10)	Feb 9, 1928	24 years, 202 days	Coliseum, Chicago, Illinois, U.S.	
127	Win	55–7–5 (60)	Phil Zwick	KO	2 (10)	Jan 24, 1928	24 years, 186 days	Auditorium, Milwaukee, Wisconsin, U.S.	
126	Win	54–7–5 (60)	Babe Ruth	PTS	10	Jan 10, 1928	24 years, 172 days	Coliseum, Chicago, Illinois, U.S.	Not to be confused with Babe Ruth
125	Loss	53–7–5 (60)	Tony Canzoneri	UD	10	Dec 30, 1927	24 years, 161 days	Madison Square Garden, New York City, New York, U.S.	
124	Win	53–6–5 (60)	Johnny Farr	PTS	10	Nov 8, 1927	24 years, 109 days	Olympic Auditorium, Los Angeles, California, U.S.	
123	Loss	52–6–5 (60)	Joey Sangor	PTS	10	Sep 20, 1927	24 years, 60 days	Olympic Auditorium, Los Angeles, California, U.S.	
122	Win	52–5–5 (60)	Midget Smith	TKO	1 (10)	Sep 1, 1927	24 years, 41 days	Culver City Stadium, Culver City, California, U.S.	
121	Win	51–5–5 (60)	Tony Canzoneri	UD	10	Jun 24, 1927	23 years, 337 days	Wrigley Field, Chicago, Illinois, U.S.	Won vacant NBA bantamweight title
120	Win	50–5–5 (60)	Bobby Hughes	KO	2 (6)	Jun 10, 1927	23 years, 323 days	Auditorium, Saint Paul, Minnesota, U.S.	
119	Win	49–5–5 (60)	Chick Suggs	RTD	5 (10)	May 31, 1927	23 years, 313 days	Olympic Auditorium, Los Angeles, California, U.S.	
118	Win	48–5–5 (60)	Abe Goldstein	UD	10	May 3, 1927	23 years, 285 days	Coliseum, Chicago, Illinois, U.S.	
117	Win	47–5–5 (60)	Young Nationalista	TKO	5 (10)	Apr 18, 1927	23 years, 270 days	Wrigley Field, Los Angeles, California, U.S.	
116	Draw	46–5–5 (60)	Tony Canzoneri	PTS	10	Mar 26, 1927	23 years, 247 days	Coliseum, Chicago, Illinois, U.S.	For vacant NBA bantamweight title
115	Win	46–5–4 (60)	Pete Sarmiento	NWS	10	Mar 15, 1927	23 years, 236 days	Terre Haute, Indiana, U.S.	
114	Win	46–5–4 (59)	Eddie Shea	PTS	10	Feb 24, 1927	23 years, 217 days	Coliseum, Chicago, Illinois, U.S.	
113	Win	45–5–4 (59)	Midget Smith	NWS	10	Feb 15, 1927	23 years, 208 days	Tomlinson Hall, Indianapolis, Indiana, U.S.	
112	Loss	45–5–4 (58)	Joey Sangor	NWS	10	Nov 29, 1926	23 years, 130 days	Auditorium, Milwaukee, Wisconsin, U.S.	
111	Win	45–5–4 (57)	Young Montreal	TKO	2 (10)	Nov 6, 1926	23 years, 107 days	Arena, Vernon, California, U.S.	
110	Win	44–5–4 (57)	Vic Burrone	NWS	10	Oct 22, 1926	23 years, 92 days	Auditorium, Saint Paul, Minnesota, U.S.	
109	Win	44–5–4 (56)	Dixie LaHood	TKO	8 (10)	Aug 18, 1926	23 years, 27 days	Olympic Auditorium, Los Angeles, California, U.S.	
108	Win	43–5–4 (56)	Tommy Ryan	DQ	4 (10)	Jul 24, 1926	23 years, 2 days	Comiskey Park, Chicago, Illinois, U.S.	Taylor unable to come out for the fourth due to a disabling low blow at the end of the third
107	Win	42–5–4 (56)	Young Nationalista	PTS	6	Jun 29, 1926	22 years, 342 days	Dugdale Park, Seattle, Washington, U.S.	
106	Draw	41–5–4 (56)	Chuck Hellman	PTS	10	Jun 25, 1926	22 years, 338 days	Armory, Portland, Oregon, U.S.	
105	Win	41–5–3 (56)	California Joe Lynch	PTS	10	Jun 18, 1926	22 years, 331 days	Dreamland Rink, San Francisco, California, U.S.	
104	Win	40–5–3 (56)	Tommy Ryan	NWS	12	May 14, 1926	22 years, 296 days	Jefferson County Armory, Louisville, Kentucky, U.S.	
103	Win	40–5–3 (55)	Clever Sencio	NWS	10	Apr 19, 1926	22 years, 271 days	Auditorium, Milwaukee, Wisconsin, U.S.	Sencio died from injuries sustained in the fight
102	Win	40–5–3 (54)	Abe Goldstein	NWS	10	Apr 8, 1926	22 years, 260 days	Hippodrome, Terre Haute, Indiana, U.S.	
101	Win	40–5–3 (53)	Doc Snell	PTS	12	Mar 26, 1926	22 years, 247 days	Public Hall, Cleveland, Ohio, U.S.	
100	Win	39–5–3 (53)	Johnny Brown	PTS	10	Mar 9, 1926	22 years, 230 days	Arena, Vernon, California, U.S.	
99	Win	38–5–3 (53)	Joey Sangor	PTS	10	Feb 3, 1926	22 years, 196 days	Olympic Auditorium, Los Angeles, California, U.S.	
98	Win	37–5–3 (53)	Jimmy McLarnin	PTS	10	Jan 12, 1926	22 years, 174 days	Arena, Vernon, California, U.S.	
97	Loss	36–5–3 (53)	Jimmy McLarnin	DQ	2 (10)	Dec 8, 1925	22 years, 139 days	Arena, Vernon, California, U.S.	Whitman awards a DQ victory after third warning for a low blow
96	Win	36–4–3 (53)	Pete Sarmiento	PTS	10	Nov 18, 1925	22 years, 119 days	Olympic Auditorium, Los Angeles, California, U.S.	
95	Win	35–4–3 (53)	Doc Snell	PTS	10	Oct 27, 1925	22 years, 97 days	Arena, Vernon, California, U.S.	
94	Loss	34–4–3 (53)	Bushy Graham	PTS	12	Aug 24, 1925	22 years, 33 days	Queensboro Stadium, New York City, New York, U.S.	
93	Win	34–3–3 (53)	Bushy Graham	NWS	10	Jul 31, 1925	22 years, 9 days	Aurora Bowl, Aurora, Illinois, U.S.	
92	Win	34–3–3 (52)	Bobby Wolgast	NWS	10	Jul 4, 1925	21 years, 347 days	Memorial Stadium (open-air), Terre Haute, Indiana, U.S.	
91	Win	34–3–3 (51)	Dynamite Joe Murphy	PTS	10	Jun 24, 1925	21 years, 337 days	Auditorium, Oakland, California, U.S.	
90	Win	33–3–3 (51)	Ernie Goozeman	TKO	7 (10)	Jun 16, 1925	21 years, 329 days	Arena, Vernon, California, U.S.	
89	Win	32–3–3 (51)	Jimmy McLarnin	PTS	10	Jun 2, 1925	21 years, 315 days	Arena, Vernon, California, U.S.	
88	Win	31–3–3 (51)	Abe Goldstein	PTS	10	May 26, 1925	21 years, 308 days	Queensboro Stadium, New York City, New York, U.S.	
87	Win	30–3–3 (51)	Midget Mike Moran	PTS	10	May 18, 1925	21 years, 300 days	Terre Haute, Indiana, U.S.	
86	Win	29–3–3 (51)	Midget Smith	PTS	10	Apr 20, 1925	21 years, 272 days	East Chicago, Indiana, U.S.	
85	Win	28–3–3 (51)	Al Ziemer	NWS	10	Jan 1, 1925	21 years, 163 days	Tomlinson Hall, Indianapolis, Indiana, U.S.	
84	Win	28–3–3 (50)	Georgie Rivers	PTS	4	Sep 23, 1924	21 years, 63 days	Arena, Vernon, California, U.S.	
83	Loss	27–3–3 (50)	Carl Tremaine	NWS	10	Aug 28, 1924	21 years, 37 days	Olympic Arena, Brooklyn, Ohio, U.S.	
82	Win	27–3–3 (49)	Pete Sarmiento	NWS	10	Aug 11, 1924	21 years, 20 days	Sager's Arena, Aurora, Illinois, U.S.	
81	Win	27–3–3 (48)	Tommy Ryan	NWS	10	Aug 1, 1924	21 years, 10 days	Three-I League Park, Terre Haute, Indiana, U.S.	
80	Win	27–3–3 (47)	Al Ziemer	NWS	10	Jun 27, 1924	20 years, 341 days	Olympic Arena, Brooklyn, Ohio, U.S.	
79	Win	27–3–3 (46)	Eddie Coulon	KO	1 (10)	Jun 23, 1924	20 years, 337 days	Ball Park, Indianapolis, Indiana, U.S.	
78	Loss	26–3–3 (46)	Pancho Villa	UD	12	Jun 10, 1924	20 years, 324 days	Henderson's Bowl, New York City, New York, U.S.	
77	Win	26–2–3 (46)	Tommy Ryan	NWS	10	May 30, 1924	20 years, 313 days	Tomlinson Hall, Indianapolis, Indiana, U.S.	
76	Draw	26–2–3 (45)	Connie Curry	NWS	10	May 26, 1924	20 years, 309 days	Sager's Arena, Aurora, Illinois, U.S.	
75	Loss	26–2–3 (44)	Rosey Stoy	NWS	12	Apr 15, 1924	20 years, 268 days	Rayen-Wood Auditorium, Youngstown, Ohio, U.S.	
74	Win	26–2–3 (43)	Al Pettingill	KO	2 (10)	Apr 7, 1924	20 years, 260 days	Tomlinson Hall, Indianapolis, Indiana, U.S.	
73	Win	25–2–3 (43)	Pancho Villa	NWS	10	Mar 6, 1924	20 years, 228 days	Auditorium, Milwaukee, Wisconsin, U.S.	
72	Win	25–2–3 (42)	Sammy Nable	NWS	10	Feb 18, 1924	20 years, 211 days	Tomlinson Hall, Indianapolis, Indiana, U.S.	
71	Loss	25–2–3 (41)	Eddie O'Dowd	PTS	10	Feb 7, 1924	20 years, 200 days	Columbus, Ohio, U.S.	
70	Win	25–1–3 (41)	Herbie Schaeffer	NWS	10	Jan 28, 1924	20 years, 190 days	East Chicago, Indiana, U.S.	
69	Win	25–1–3 (40)	Frankie Jerome	TKO	12 (12)	Jan 11, 1924	20 years, 173 days	Madison Square Garden, New York City, New York, U.S.	Frankie Jerome died from injuries sustained from this fight.
68	Win	24–1–3 (40)	Johnny Brown	KO	3 (10)	Jan 7, 1924	20 years, 169 days	Tomlinson Hall, Indianapolis, Indiana, U.S.	
67	Win	23–1–3 (40)	Sammy Nable	PTS	12	Jan 1, 1924	20 years, 163 days	Pioneer Sporting Club, New York City, New York, U.S.	
66	Win	22–1–3 (40)	Roy Moore	NWS	10	Dec 5, 1923	20 years, 136 days	Terre Haute, Indiana, U.S.	
65	Win	22–1–3 (39)	Charley Phil Rosenberg	PTS	12	Oct 19, 1923	20 years, 89 days	Madison Square Garden, New York City, New York, U.S.	
64	Loss	21–1–3 (39)	Pancho Villa	NWS	10	Sep 8, 1923	20 years, 48 days	Hawthorne Race Course, Chicago, Illinois, U.S.	
63	Win	21–1–3 (38)	Harry Gordon	NWS	10	Sep 3, 1923	20 years, 43 days	Terre Haute, Indiana, U.S.	
62	Draw	21–1–3 (37)	Hilly Levine	NWS	10	Aug 24, 1923	20 years, 33 days	Mullen-Sager Arena, Aurora, Illinois, U.S.	
61	Win	21–1–3 (36)	Tommy Murray	NWS	10	Jul 30, 1923	20 years, 8 days	Three-I League Park, Terre Haute, Indiana, U.S.	
60	Win	21–1–3 (35)	Harry Gordon	NWS	10	Jul 20, 1923	19 years, 363 days	Mullen-Sager Arena, Aurora, Illinois, U.S.	
59	Win	21–1–3 (34)	Johnny Sheppard	NWS	10	Jul 5, 1923	19 years, 348 days	Washington Park, Indianapolis, Indiana, U.S.	
58	Win	21–1–3 (33)	Battling Al Murray	NWS	10	Jun 25, 1923	19 years, 338 days	Three-I League Park, Terre Haute, Indiana, U.S.	
57	Win	21–1–3 (32)	Johnny Sheppard	NWS	10	May 29, 1923	19 years, 311 days	Washington Park, Indianapolis, Indiana, U.S.	
56	Loss	21–1–3 (31)	Frankie Genaro	NWS	10	Apr 4, 1923	19 years, 256 days	Coliseum, Chicago, Illinois, U.S.	
55	Draw	21–1–3 (30)	Memphis Pal Moore	NWS	10	Feb 13, 1923	19 years, 206 days	Tomlinson Hall, Indianapolis, Indiana, U.S.	
54	Draw	21–1–3 (29)	Memphis Pal Moore	NWS	10	Jan 15, 1923	19 years, 177 days	East Chicago, Indiana, U.S.	
53	Win	21–1–3 (28)	Jimmy Kelly	NWS	10	Jan 8, 1923	19 years, 170 days	Suburban club, Chicago suburb, Illinois, U.S.	
52	Win	21–1–3 (27)	Benny Vogel	KO	1 (10)	Jan 1, 1923	19 years, 163 days	Tomlinson Hall, Indianapolis, Indiana, U.S.	
51	Loss	20–1–3 (27)	Memphis Pal Moore	NWS	10	Dec 22, 1922	19 years, 153 days	U.S.S. Commodore, Lake Michigan, U.S.	
50	Win	20–1–3 (26)	Eddie Santry	TKO	5 (10)	Nov 30, 1922	19 years, 131 days	Terre Haute, Indiana, U.S.	
49	Win	19–1–3 (26)	Billy O'Brien	NWS	10	Nov 27, 1922	19 years, 128 days	Peoria, Illinois, U.S.	
48	Win	19–1–3 (25)	Battling Chink	NWS	10	Nov 1, 1922	19 years, 102 days	Grand Opera House, Terre Haute, Indiana, U.S.	
47	Win	19–1–3 (24)	Stanley Everett	TKO	5 (10)	Oct 13, 1922	19 years, 83 days	U.S.S. Commodore, Lake Michigan, U.S.	
46	Loss	18–1–3 (24)	Harold Smith	NWS	10	Sep 21, 1922	19 years, 61 days	Harbor Auditorium, East Chicago, Indiana, U.S.	
45	Win	18–1–3 (23)	Jimmy Kelly	NWS	10	Sep 4, 1922	19 years, 44 days	Three-I League Park, Terre Haute, Pennsylvania, U.S.	
44	Win	18–1–3 (22)	Babe Asher	NWS	10	Jul 4, 1922	18 years, 347 days	Three-I League Park, Terre Haute, Pennsylvania, U.S.	
43	Loss	18–1–3 (21)	Memphis Pal Moore	NWS	10	Jun 23, 1922	18 years, 336 days	Mullen-Sager Arena, Aurora, Illinois, U.S.	
42	Win	18–1–3 (20)	Herbie Schaeffer	NWS	10	Jun 15, 1922	18 years, 328 days	Washington Park, Indianapolis, Indiana, U.S.	
41	Win	18–1–3 (19)	Kid Buck	NWS	10	May 15, 1922	18 years, 297 days	Broadway Theater, Logansport, Indiana, U.S.	
40	Win	18–1–3 (18)	Frankie Henke	TKO	7 (10)	Apr 21, 1922	18 years, 273 days	U.S.S. Commodore, Lake Michigan, U.S.	
39	Win	17–1–3 (18)	Jimmy Kelly	NWS	10	Mar 22, 1922	18 years, 243 days	Kenosha, Wisconsin, U.S.	
38	Draw	17–1–3 (17)	Herbie Schaeffer	PTS	10	Mar 10, 1922	18 years, 231 days	U.S.S. Commodore, Lake Michigan, U.S.	
37	Draw	17–1–2 (17)	Harold Smith	PTS	10	Feb 23, 1922	18 years, 185 days	La Salle, Illinois, U.S.	
36	Loss	17–1–1 (17)	Jimmy Kelly	TKO	6 (12)	Feb 10, 1922	18 years, 203 days	U.S.S. Commodore, Lake Michigan, U.S.	
35	Win	17–0–1 (17)	Ollie O'Neill	PTS	8	Jan 24, 1922	18 years, 186 days	Suburban Club, Chicago, Indiana, U.S.	
34	Win	16–0–1 (17)	George Corbett	TKO	3 (10)	Jan 13, 1922	18 years, 175 days	Suburban Club, Chicago, Indiana, U.S.	
33	Win	15–0–1 (17)	Solly Epstein	TKO	1 (10)	Jan 5, 1922	18 years, 167 days	Grand Opera House, Terre Haute, Indiana, U.S.	
32	Win	14–0–1 (17)	Harold Smith	NWS	10	Dec 29, 1921	18 years, 160 days	La Salle, Illinois, U.S.	
31	Win	14–0–1 (16)	Stanley Everett	NWS	10	Dec 12, 1921	18 years, 143 days	Terre Haute, Pennsylvania, U.S.	
30	Draw	14–0–1 (15)	Herbie Schaeffer	PTS	10	Dec 5, 1921	18 years, 136 days	Omaha, Nebraska, U.S.	
29	Win	14–0 (15)	Harold Smith	NWS	6	Dec 3, 1921	18 years, 134 days	Chicago, Illinois, U.S.	
28	Win	14–0 (14)	Chick Allman	PTS	10	Nov 7, 1921	18 years, 108 days	Terre Haute, Indiana, U.S.	
27	Win	13–0 (14)	Solly Epstein	KO	9 (?)	Oct 10, 1921	18 years, 80 days	K of C Hall, Terre Haute, Indiana, U.S.	
26	Win	12–0 (14)	Herbie Schaeffer	NWS	8	Sep 5, 1921	18 years, 45 days	South Bend, Indiana, U.S.	
25	Win	12–0 (13)	Patsy Drennan	KO	1 (?)	Aug 22, 1921	18 years, 31 days	Terre Haute, Pennsylvania, U.S.	
24	Loss	11–0 (13)	Battling Chink	NWS	12	Jul 25, 1921	18 years, 3 days	Broadway Bowl, Louisville, Kentucky, U.S.	
23	Win	11–0 (12)	Johnny McGrath	KO	3 (?)	Jul 21, 1921	17 years, 364 days	Springfield, Illinois, U.S.	
22	Loss	10–0 (12)	Eddie O'Dowd	NWS	12	Jul 18, 1921	17 years, 361 days	Broadway Arena, Louisville, Kentucky, U.S.	
21	Win	10–0 (11)	Battling Chink	NWS	12	Apr 29, 1921	17 years, 281 days	Grand Opera House, Terre Haute, Pennsylvania, U.S.	
20	Draw	10–0 (10)	Phil O'Dowd	NWS	10	Apr 25, 1921	17 years, 277 days	Terre Haute, Pennsylvania, U.S.	
19	Win	10–0 (9)	Dutch Davison	KO	1 (?)	Apr 4, 1921	17 years, 256 days	K of C Hall, Terre Haute, Pennsylvania, U.S.	
18	Win	9–0 (9)	Jimmy Murphy	NWS	8	Mar 21, 1921	17 years, 242 days	1st Regiment Armory, Saint Louis, Missouri, U.S.	
17	Draw	9–0 (8)	Jimmy Murphy	NWS	10	Feb 28, 1921	17 years, 221 days	K of C Hall, Terre Haute, Pennsylvania, U.S.	
16	Draw	9–0 (7)	Jimmy Murphy	NWS	6	Jan 31, 1921	17 years, 193 days	Armory, Saint Louis, Missouri, U.S.	
15	Draw	9–0 (6)	Frankie Mason	NWS	10	Jan 17, 1921	17 years, 179 days	K of C Hall, Terre Haute, Pennsylvania, U.S.	
14	Win	9–0 (5)	Bobby Moon	NWS	10	Jan 1, 1921	17 years, 163 days	K of C Hall, Terre Haute, Pennsylvania, U.S.	
13	Win	9–0 (4)	Whitey Morrett	NWS	10	Dec 13, 1920	17 years, 144 days	K of C Hall, Terre Haute, Pennsylvania, U.S.	
12	Win	9–0 (3)	Young Dempsey	KO	2 (10)	Nov 25, 1920	17 years, 126 days	K of C Hall, Terre Haute, Pennsylvania, U.S.	
11	Loss	8–0 (3)	Whitey Morrett	NWS	6	Nov 8, 1920	17 years, 109 days	Heuck's Opera House, Cincinnati, Ohio, U.S.	
10	Win	8–0 (2)	Jimmy Burns	TKO	9 (10)	Nov 1, 1920	17 years, 102 days	K of C Hall, Terre Haute, Pennsylvania, U.S.	
9	Win	7–0 (2)	Artie Armstrong	NWS	10	Oct 4, 1920	17 years, 74 days	K of C Hall, Terre Haute, Pennsylvania, U.S.	
8	Win	7–0 (1)	Dutch Davison	KO	3 (?)	Aug 2, 1920	17 years, 11 days	Muncie, Indiana, U.S.	
7	Win	6–0 (1)	Bruce Mickles	KO	2 (?)	Jul 26, 1920	17 years, 4 days	Clinton, Indiana, U.S.	
6	Win	5–0 (1)	Artie Armstrong	NWS	10	Jul 6, 1920	16 years, 350 days	Vincennes, Indiana, U.S.	
5	Win	5–0	Dave Templeton	KO	4 (?)	Jun 7, 1920	16 years, 321 days	Vincennes, Indiana, U.S.	
4	Win	4–0	Jack Edwards	TKO	2 (?)	May 24, 1920	16 years, 307 days	Campbell's Auditorium, Muncie, Indiana, U.S.	
3	Win	3–0	Walter Gering	TKO	4 (?)	Mar 15, 1920	16 years, 237 days	Terre Haute, Pennsylvania, U.S.	
2	Win	2–0	Everett Shepherd	KO	3 (4)	Feb 16, 1920	16 years, 209 days	K of C Hall, Terre Haute, Pennsylvania, U.S.	
1	Win	1–0	Dave Templeton	PTS	3	Jan 25, 1920	16 years, 187 days	K of C Hall, Terre Haute, Pennsylvania, U.S.	

=== Unofficial record ===
164 fights	115 wins	33 losses
By knockout	37	4
By decision	77	26
By disqualification	1	3
Draws	16	

Record with the inclusion of newspaper decisions in the win/loss/draw column.

No.	Result	Record	Opponent	Type	Round	Date	Age	Location	Notes
164	Loss	116–32–16	Lew Massey	DQ	8 (10)	Mar 16, 1931	27 years, 237 days	Arena, Philadelphia, Pennsylvania, U.S.	Taylor DQ'd for "not trying"
163	Loss	116–31–16	Benny Bass	TKO	2 (10)	Feb 16, 1931	27 years, 209 days	Arena, Philadelphia, Pennsylvania, U.S.	
162	Win	116–30–16	Sammy Hackett	KO	3 (10)	Jan 30, 1931	27 years, 192 days	Broadway Auditorium, Buffalo, New York, U.S.	
161	Win	115–30–16	Joe Lucas	NWS	10	Jan 13, 1931	27 years, 175 days	Armory, Indianapolis, Indiana, U.S.	
160	Loss	114–30–16	Fidel LaBarba	PTS	10	Nov 28, 1930	27 years, 129 days	Madison Square Garden, New York City, New York, U.S.	
159	Loss	114–29–16	Maurice Holtzer	PTS	10	Nov 10, 1930	27 years, 111 days	Olympic Auditorium, Los Angeles, California, U.S.	
158	Draw	114–28–16	Santiago Zorrilla	PTS	8	Oct 21, 1930	27 years, 91 days	Crystal Pool, Seattle, Washington, U.S.	
157	Win	114–28–15	Eddie Edelman	PTS	6	Oct 14, 1930	27 years, 84 days	Post Street Theater, Spokane, Washington, U.S.	
156	Loss	113–28–15	Christopher Battalino	PTS	10	Aug 18, 1930	27 years, 27 days	Hurley Stadium, East Hartford, Connecticut, U.S.	
155	Win	113–27–15	Mickey Genaro	NWS	10	Jul 29, 1930	27 years, 7 days	Fort Benjamin Harrison, Lawrence, Indiana, U.S.	
154	Loss	112–27–15	Earl Mastro	PTS	10	Jul 1, 1930	26 years, 344 days	Michigan State Fairgrounds, Detroit, Michigan, U.S.	
153	Win	112–26–15	Johnny Kaiser	TKO	3 (10)	Jun 12, 1930	26 years, 325 days	Reservoir Park, Springfield, Illinois, U.S.	
152	Win	111–26–15	Jackie Johnston	KO	2 (10)	Jun 3, 1930	26 years, 316 days	Congress Outdoor Stadium, Chicago, Illinois, U.S.	
151	Loss	110–26–15	Fidel LaBarba	PTS	10	Apr 21, 1930	26 years, 273 days	Coliseum, Chicago, Illinois, U.S.	
150	Win	110–25–15	Paul Wangley	KO	5 (10)	Apr 11, 1930	26 years, 263 days	Auditorium, Minneapolis, Minnesota, U.S.	
149	Win	109–25–15	Christopher Battalino	PTS	10	Mar 20, 1930	26 years, 241 days	Olympia Stadium, Detroit, Michigan, U.S.	
148	Loss	108–25–15	Earl Mastro	TKO	9 (10)	Dec 27, 1929	26 years, 158 days	Chicago Stadium, Chicago, Illinois, U.S.	
147	Win	108–24–15	Santiago Zorrilla	UD	10	Nov 15, 1929	26 years, 116 days	Coliseum, Chicago, Illinois, U.S.	
146	Draw	107–24–15	Earl Mastro	PTS	10	Oct 8, 1929	26 years, 78 days	Chicago Stadium, Chicago, Illinois, U.S.	
145	Win	107–24–14	Orlando Martinez	KO	4 (10)	Sep 20, 1929	26 years, 60 days	Coliseum, Evansville, Indiana, U.S.	
144	Loss	106–24–14	Andy Martin	PTS	10	Jul 22, 1929	26 years, 0 days	Boston Garden, Boston, Massachusetts, U.S.	
143	Draw	106–23–14	Goldie Hess	PTS	10	Jun 11, 1929	25 years, 324 days	Olympic Auditorium, Los Angeles, California, U.S.	
142	Win	106–23–13	Tommy Murray	KO	2 (10)	Apr 16, 1929	25 years, 268 days	Armory, Indianapolis, Indiana, U.S.	
141	Loss	105–23–13	Young Montreal	PTS	10	Apr 10, 1929	25 years, 262 days	Rhode Island Auditorium, Providence, Rhode Island, U.S.	
140	Win	105–22–13	Henry Falegano	NWS	8	Apr 2, 1929	25 years, 254 days	Arcadia Ballroom, Milwaukee, Wisconsin, U.S.	
139	Loss	104–22–13	Al Singer	PTS	10	Mar 15, 1929	25 years, 236 days	Madison Square Garden, New York City, New York, U.S.	
138	Loss	104–21–13	Al Singer	DQ	4 (10)	Feb 8, 1929	25 years, 201 days	Madison Square Garden, New York City, New York, U.S.	
137	Win	104–20–13	Bobby Dempsey	KO	4 (10)	Jan 31, 1929	25 years, 193 days	Coliseum, Davenport, Iowa, U.S.	
136	Win	103–20–13	Billy Shaw	NWS	10	Jan 29, 1929	25 years, 191 days	Armory, Indianapolis, Indiana, U.S.	
135	Loss	102–20–13	Santiago Zorrilla	PTS	10	Jul 27, 1928	25 years, 5 days	Dreamland Auditorium, San Francisco, California, U.S.	
134	Win	102–19–13	Johnny Vacca	PTS	10	Jul 10, 1928	24 years, 354 days	Olympic Auditorium, Los Angeles, California, U.S.	
133	Win	101–19–13	Santiago Zorrilla	PTS	10	Jun 29, 1928	24 years, 343 days	Dreamland Auditorium, San Francisco, California, U.S.	
132	Win	100–19–13	Joe Lucas	PTS	10	May 21, 1928	24 years, 304 days	White City Arena, Chicago, Illinois, U.S.	
131	Win	99–19–13	Santiago Zorrilla	PTS	10	Apr 3, 1928	24 years, 256 days	Olympic Auditorium, Los Angeles, California, U.S.	
130	Loss	98–19–13	Vic Foley	UD	10	Mar 23, 1928	24 years, 245 days	Arena, Vancouver, British Columbia, Canada	
129	Win	98–18–13	Ignacio Fernandez	PTS	10	Mar 6, 1928	24 years, 228 days	Olympic Auditorium, Los Angeles, California, U.S.	
128	Loss	97–18–13	Joey Sangor	TKO	7 (10)	Feb 9, 1928	24 years, 202 days	Coliseum, Chicago, Illinois, U.S.	
127	Win	96–18–13	Phil Zwick	KO	2 (10)	Jan 24, 1928	24 years, 186 days	Auditorium, Milwaukee, Wisconsin, U.S.	
126	Win	95–18–13	Babe Ruth	PTS	10	Jan 10, 1928	24 years, 172 days	Coliseum, Chicago, Illinois, U.S.	Not to be confused with Babe Ruth
125	Loss	94–18–13	Tony Canzoneri	UD	10	Dec 30, 1927	24 years, 161 days	Madison Square Garden, New York City, New York, U.S.	
124	Win	94–17–13	Johnny Farr	PTS	10	Nov 8, 1927	24 years, 109 days	Olympic Auditorium, Los Angeles, California, U.S.	
123	Loss	93–17–13	Joey Sangor	PTS	10	Sep 20, 1927	24 years, 60 days	Olympic Auditorium, Los Angeles, California, U.S.	
122	Win	93–16–13	Midget Smith	TKO	1 (10)	Sep 1, 1927	24 years, 41 days	Culver City Stadium, Culver City, California, U.S.	
121	Win	92–16–13	Tony Canzoneri	UD	10	Jun 24, 1927	23 years, 337 days	Wrigley Field, Chicago, Illinois, U.S.	Won vacant NBA bantamweight title
120	Win	91–16–13	Bobby Hughes	KO	2 (6)	Jun 10, 1927	23 years, 323 days	Auditorium, Saint Paul, Minnesota, U.S.	
119	Win	90–16–13	Chick Suggs	RTD	5 (10)	May 31, 1927	23 years, 313 days	Olympic Auditorium, Los Angeles, California, U.S.	
118	Win	89–16–13	Abe Goldstein	UD	10	May 3, 1927	23 years, 285 days	Coliseum, Chicago, Illinois, U.S.	
117	Win	88–16–13	Young Nationalista	TKO	5 (10)	Apr 18, 1927	23 years, 270 days	Wrigley Field, Los Angeles, California, U.S.	
116	Draw	87–16–13	Tony Canzoneri	PTS	10	Mar 26, 1927	23 years, 247 days	Coliseum, Chicago, Illinois, U.S.	For vacant NBA bantamweight title
115	Win	87–16–12	Pete Sarmiento	NWS	10	Mar 15, 1927	23 years, 236 days	Terre Haute, Indiana, U.S.	
114	Win	86–16–12	Eddie Shea	PTS	10	Feb 24, 1927	23 years, 217 days	Coliseum, Chicago, Illinois, U.S.	
113	Win	85–16–12	Midget Smith	NWS	10	Feb 15, 1927	23 years, 208 days	Tomlinson Hall, Indianapolis, Indiana, U.S.	
112	Loss	84–16–12	Joey Sangor	NWS	10	Nov 29, 1926	23 years, 130 days	Auditorium, Milwaukee, Wisconsin, U.S.	
111	Win	84–15–12	Young Montreal	TKO	2 (10)	Nov 6, 1926	23 years, 107 days	Arena, Vernon, California, U.S.	
110	Win	83–15–12	Vic Burrone	NWS	10	Oct 22, 1926	23 years, 92 days	Auditorium, Saint Paul, Minnesota, U.S.	
109	Win	82–15–12	Dixie LaHood	TKO	8 (10)	Aug 18, 1926	23 years, 27 days	Olympic Auditorium, Los Angeles, California, U.S.	
108	Win	81–15–12	Tommy Ryan	DQ	4 (10)	Jul 24, 1926	23 years, 2 days	Comiskey Park, Chicago, Illinois, U.S.	Taylor unable to come out for the fourth due to a disabling low blow at the end of the third
107	Win	80–15–12	Young Nationalista	PTS	6	Jun 29, 1926	22 years, 342 days	Dugdale Park, Seattle, Washington, U.S.	
106	Draw	79–15–12	Chuck Hellman	PTS	10	Jun 25, 1926	22 years, 338 days	Armory, Portland, Oregon, U.S.	
105	Win	79–15–11	California Joe Lynch	PTS	10	Jun 18, 1926	22 years, 331 days	Dreamland Rink, San Francisco, California, U.S.	
104	Win	78–15–11	Tommy Ryan	NWS	12	May 14, 1926	22 years, 296 days	Jefferson County Armory, Louisville, Kentucky, U.S.	
103	Win	77–15–11	Clever Sencio	NWS	10	Apr 19, 1926	22 years, 271 days	Auditorium, Milwaukee, Wisconsin, U.S.	Sencio died from injuries sustained in the fight
102	Win	76–15–11	Abe Goldstein	NWS	10	Apr 8, 1926	22 years, 260 days	Hippodrome, Terre Haute, Indiana, U.S.	
101	Win	75–15–11	Doc Snell	PTS	12	Mar 26, 1926	22 years, 247 days	Public Hall, Cleveland, Ohio, U.S.	
100	Win	74–15–11	Johnny Brown	PTS	10	Mar 9, 1926	22 years, 230 days	Arena, Vernon, California, U.S.	
99	Win	73–15–11	Joey Sangor	PTS	10	Feb 3, 1926	22 years, 196 days	Olympic Auditorium, Los Angeles, California, U.S.	
98	Win	72–15–11	Jimmy McLarnin	PTS	10	Jan 12, 1926	22 years, 174 days	Arena, Vernon, California, U.S.	
97	Loss	71–15–11	Jimmy McLarnin	DQ	2 (10)	Dec 8, 1925	22 years, 139 days	Arena, Vernon, California, U.S.	Whitman awards a DQ victory after third warning for a low blow
96	Win	71–14–11	Pete Sarmiento	PTS	10	Nov 18, 1925	22 years, 119 days	Olympic Auditorium, Los Angeles, California, U.S.	
95	Win	70–14–11	Doc Snell	PTS	10	Oct 27, 1925	22 years, 97 days	Arena, Vernon, California, U.S.	
94	Loss	69–14–11	Bushy Graham	PTS	12	Aug 24, 1925	22 years, 33 days	Queensboro Stadium, New York City, New York, U.S.	
93	Win	69–13–11	Bushy Graham	NWS	10	Jul 31, 1925	22 years, 9 days	Aurora Bowl, Aurora, Illinois, U.S.	
92	Win	68–13–11	Bobby Wolgast	NWS	10	Jul 4, 1925	21 years, 347 days	Memorial Stadium (open-air), Terre Haute, Indiana, U.S.	
91	Win	67–13–11	Dynamite Joe Murphy	PTS	10	Jun 24, 1925	21 years, 337 days	Auditorium, Oakland, California, U.S.	
90	Win	66–13–11	Ernie Goozeman	TKO	7 (10)	Jun 16, 1925	21 years, 329 days	Arena, Vernon, California, U.S.	
89	Win	65–13–11	Jimmy McLarnin	PTS	10	Jun 2, 1925	21 years, 315 days	Arena, Vernon, California, U.S.	
88	Win	64–13–11	Abe Goldstein	PTS	10	May 26, 1925	21 years, 308 days	Queensboro Stadium, New York City, New York, U.S.	
87	Win	63–13–11	Midget Mike Moran	PTS	10	May 18, 1925	21 years, 300 days	Terre Haute, Indiana, U.S.	
86	Win	62–13–11	Midget Smith	PTS	10	Apr 20, 1925	21 years, 272 days	East Chicago, Indiana, U.S.	
85	Win	61–13–11	Al Ziemer	NWS	10	Jan 1, 1925	21 years, 163 days	Tomlinson Hall, Indianapolis, Indiana, U.S.	
84	Win	60–13–11	Georgie Rivers	PTS	4	Sep 23, 1924	21 years, 63 days	Arena, Vernon, California, U.S.	
83	Loss	59–13–11	Carl Tremaine	NWS	10	Aug 28, 1924	21 years, 37 days	Olympic Arena, Brooklyn, Ohio, U.S.	
82	Win	59–12–11	Pete Sarmiento	NWS	10	Aug 11, 1924	21 years, 20 days	Sager's Arena, Aurora, Illinois, U.S.	
81	Win	58–12–11	Tommy Ryan	NWS	10	Aug 1, 1924	21 years, 10 days	Three-I League Park, Terre Haute, Indiana, U.S.	
80	Win	57–12–11	Al Ziemer	NWS	10	Jun 27, 1924	20 years, 341 days	Olympic Arena, Brooklyn, Ohio, U.S.	
79	Win	56–12–11	Eddie Coulon	KO	1 (10)	Jun 23, 1924	20 years, 337 days	Ball Park, Indianapolis, Indiana, U.S.	
78	Loss	55–12–11	Pancho Villa	UD	12	Jun 10, 1924	20 years, 324 days	Henderson's Bowl, New York City, New York, U.S.	
77	Win	55–11–11	Tommy Ryan	NWS	10	May 30, 1924	20 years, 313 days	Tomlinson Hall, Indianapolis, Indiana, U.S.	
76	Draw	54–11–11	Connie Curry	NWS	10	May 26, 1924	20 years, 309 days	Sager's Arena, Aurora, Illinois, U.S.	
75	Loss	54–11–10	Rosey Stoy	NWS	12	Apr 15, 1924	20 years, 268 days	Rayen-Wood Auditorium, Youngstown, Ohio, U.S.	
74	Win	54–10–10	Al Pettingill	KO	2 (10)	Apr 7, 1924	20 years, 260 days	Tomlinson Hall, Indianapolis, Indiana, U.S.	
73	Win	53–10–10	Pancho Villa	NWS	10	Mar 6, 1924	20 years, 228 days	Auditorium, Milwaukee, Wisconsin, U.S.	
72	Win	52–10–10	Sammy Nable	NWS	10	Feb 18, 1924	20 years, 211 days	Tomlinson Hall, Indianapolis, Indiana, U.S.	
71	Loss	51–10–10	Eddie O'Dowd	PTS	10	Feb 7, 1924	20 years, 200 days	Columbus, Ohio, U.S.	
70	Win	51–9–10	Herbie Schaeffer	NWS	10	Jan 28, 1924	20 years, 190 days	East Chicago, Indiana, U.S.	
69	Win	50–9–10	Frankie Jerome	TKO	12 (12)	Jan 11, 1924	20 years, 173 days	Madison Square Garden, New York City, New York, U.S.	Jerome died two days later as a result of this bout.
68	Win	49–9–10	Johnny Brown	KO	3 (10)	Jan 7, 1924	20 years, 169 days	Tomlinson Hall, Indianapolis, Indiana, U.S.	
67	Win	48–9–10	Sammy Nable	PTS	12	Jan 1, 1924	20 years, 163 days	Pioneer Sporting Club, New York City, New York, U.S.	
66	Win	47–9–10	Roy Moore	NWS	10	Dec 5, 1923	20 years, 136 days	Terre Haute, Indiana, U.S.	
65	Win	46–9–10	Charley Phil Rosenberg	PTS	12	Oct 19, 1923	20 years, 89 days	Madison Square Garden, New York City, New York, U.S.	
64	Loss	45–9–10	Pancho Villa	NWS	10	Sep 8, 1923	20 years, 48 days	Hawthorne Race Course, Chicago, Illinois, U.S.	
63	Win	45–8–10	Harry Gordon	NWS	10	Sep 3, 1923	20 years, 43 days	Terre Haute, Indiana, U.S.	
62	Draw	44–8–10	Hilly Levine	NWS	10	Aug 24, 1923	20 years, 33 days	Mullen-Sager Arena, Aurora, Illinois, U.S.	
61	Win	44–8–9	Tommy Murray	NWS	10	Jul 30, 1923	20 years, 8 days	Three-I League Park, Terre Haute, Indiana, U.S.	
60	Win	43–8–9	Harry Gordon	NWS	10	Jul 20, 1923	19 years, 363 days	Mullen-Sager Arena, Aurora, Illinois, U.S.	
59	Win	42–8–9	Johnny Sheppard	NWS	10	Jul 5, 1923	19 years, 348 days	Washington Park, Indianapolis, Indiana, U.S.	
58	Win	41–8–9	Battling Al Murray	NWS	10	Jun 25, 1923	19 years, 338 days	Three-I League Park, Terre Haute, Indiana, U.S.	
57	Win	40–8–9	Johnny Sheppard	NWS	10	May 29, 1923	19 years, 311 days	Washington Park, Indianapolis, Indiana, U.S.	
56	Loss	39–8–9	Frankie Genaro	NWS	10	Apr 4, 1923	19 years, 256 days	Coliseum, Chicago, Illinois, U.S.	
55	Draw	39–7–9	Memphis Pal Moore	NWS	10	Feb 13, 1923	19 years, 206 days	Tomlinson Hall, Indianapolis, Indiana, U.S.	
54	Draw	39–7–8	Memphis Pal Moore	NWS	10	Jan 15, 1923	19 years, 177 days	East Chicago, Indiana, U.S.	
53	Win	39–7–7	Jimmy Kelly	NWS	10	Jan 8, 1923	19 years, 170 days	Suburban club, Chicago suburb, Illinois, U.S.	
52	Win	38–7–7	Benny Vogel	KO	1 (10)	Jan 1, 1923	19 years, 163 days	Tomlinson Hall, Indianapolis, Indiana, U.S.	
51	Loss	37–7–7	Memphis Pal Moore	NWS	10	Dec 22, 1922	19 years, 153 days	U.S.S. Commodore, Lake Michigan, U.S.	
50	Win	37–6–7	Eddie Santry	TKO	5 (10)	Nov 30, 1922	19 years, 131 days	Terre Haute, Indiana, U.S.	
49	Win	36–6–7	Billy O'Brien	NWS	10	Nov 27, 1922	19 years, 128 days	Peoria, Illinois, U.S.	
48	Win	35–6–7	Battling Chink	NWS	10	Nov 1, 1922	19 years, 102 days	Grand Opera House, Terre Haute, Indiana, U.S.	
47	Win	34–6–7	Stanley Everett	TKO	5 (10)	Oct 13, 1922	19 years, 83 days	U.S.S. Commodore, Lake Michigan, U.S.	
46	Loss	33–6–7	Harold Smith	NWS	10	Sep 21, 1922	19 years, 61 days	Harbor Auditorium, East Chicago, Indiana, U.S.	
45	Win	33–5–7	Jimmy Kelly	NWS	10	Sep 4, 1922	19 years, 44 days	Three-I League Park, Terre Haute, Pennsylvania, U.S.	
44	Win	32–5–7	Babe Asher	NWS	10	Jul 4, 1922	18 years, 347 days	Three-I League Park, Terre Haute, Pennsylvania, U.S.	
43	Loss	31–5–7	Memphis Pal Moore	NWS	10	Jun 23, 1922	18 years, 336 days	Mullen-Sager Arena, Aurora, Illinois, U.S.	
42	Win	31–4–7	Herbie Schaeffer	NWS	10	Jun 15, 1922	18 years, 328 days	Washington Park, Indianapolis, Indiana, U.S.	
41	Win	30–4–7	Kid Buck	NWS	10	May 15, 1922	18 years, 297 days	Broadway Theater, Logansport, Indiana, U.S.	
40	Win	29–4–7	Frankie Henke	TKO	7 (10)	Apr 21, 1922	18 years, 273 days	U.S.S. Commodore, Lake Michigan, U.S.	
39	Win	28–4–7	Jimmy Kelly	NWS	10	Mar 22, 1922	18 years, 243 days	Kenosha, Wisconsin, U.S.	
38	Draw	27–4–7	Herbie Schaeffer	PTS	10	Mar 10, 1922	18 years, 231 days	U.S.S. Commodore, Lake Michigan, U.S.	
37	Draw	27–4–6	Harold Smith	PTS	10	Feb 23, 1922	18 years, 185 days	La Salle, Illinois, U.S.	
36	Loss	27–4–5	Jimmy Kelly	TKO	6 (12)	Feb 10, 1922	18 years, 203 days	U.S.S. Commodore, Lake Michigan, U.S.	
35	Win	27–3–5	Ollie O'Neill	PTS	8	Jan 24, 1922	18 years, 186 days	Suburban Club, Chicago, Indiana, U.S.	
34	Win	26–3–5	George Corbett	TKO	3 (10)	Jan 13, 1922	18 years, 175 days	Suburban Club, Chicago, Indiana, U.S.	
33	Win	25–3–5	Solly Epstein	TKO	1 (10)	Jan 5, 1922	18 years, 167 days	Grand Opera House, Terre Haute, Indiana, U.S.	
32	Win	24–3–5	Harold Smith	NWS	10	Dec 29, 1921	18 years, 160 days	La Salle, Illinois, U.S.	
31	Win	23–3–5	Stanley Everett	NWS	10	Dec 12, 1921	18 years, 143 days	Terre Haute, Pennsylvania, U.S.	
30	Draw	22–3–5	Herbie Schaeffer	PTS	10	Dec 5, 1921	18 years, 136 days	Omaha, Nebraska, U.S.	
29	Win	22–3–4	Harold Smith	NWS	6	Dec 3, 1921	18 years, 134 days	Chicago, Illinois, U.S.	
28	Win	21–3–4	Chick Allman	PTS	10	Nov 7, 1921	18 years, 108 days	Terre Haute, Indiana, U.S.	
27	Win	20–3–4	Solly Epstein	KO	9 (?)	Oct 10, 1921	18 years, 80 days	K of C Hall, Terre Haute, Indiana, U.S.	
26	Win	19–3–4	Herbie Schaeffer	NWS	8	Sep 5, 1921	18 years, 45 days	South Bend, Indiana, U.S.	
25	Win	18–3–4	Patsy Drennan	KO	1 (?)	Aug 22, 1921	18 years, 31 days	Terre Haute, Pennsylvania, U.S.	
24	Loss	17–3–4	Battling Chink	NWS	12	Jul 25, 1921	18 years, 3 days	Broadway Bowl, Louisville, Kentucky, U.S.	
23	Win	17–2–4	Johnny McGrath	KO	3 (?)	Jul 21, 1921	17 years, 364 days	Springfield, Illinois, U.S.	
22	Loss	16–2–4	Eddie O'Dowd	NWS	12	Jul 18, 1921	17 years, 361 days	Broadway Arena, Louisville, Kentucky, U.S.	
21	Win	16–1–4	Battling Chink	NWS	12	Apr 29, 1921	17 years, 281 days	Grand Opera House, Terre Haute, Pennsylvania, U.S.	
20	Draw	15–1–4	Phil O'Dowd	NWS	10	Apr 25, 1921	17 years, 277 days	Terre Haute, Pennsylvania, U.S.	
19	Win	15–1–3	Dutch Davison	KO	1 (?)	Apr 4, 1921	17 years, 256 days	K of C Hall, Terre Haute, Pennsylvania, U.S.	
18	Win	14–1–3	Jimmy Murphy	NWS	8	Mar 21, 1921	17 years, 242 days	1st Regiment Armory, Saint Louis, Missouri, U.S.	
17	Draw	13–1–3	Jimmy Murphy	NWS	10	Feb 28, 1921	17 years, 221 days	K of C Hall, Terre Haute, Pennsylvania, U.S.	
16	Draw	13–1–2	Jimmy Murphy	NWS	6	Jan 31, 1921	17 years, 193 days	Armory, Saint Louis, Missouri, U.S.	
15	Draw	13–1–1	Frankie Mason	NWS	10	Jan 17, 1921	17 years, 179 days	K of C Hall, Terre Haute, Pennsylvania, U.S.	
14	Win	13–1	Bobby Moon	NWS	10	Jan 1, 1921	17 years, 163 days	K of C Hall, Terre Haute, Pennsylvania, U.S.	
13	Win	12–1	Whitey Morrett	NWS	10	Dec 13, 1920	17 years, 144 days	K of C Hall, Terre Haute, Pennsylvania, U.S.	
12	Win	11–1	Young Dempsey	KO	2 (10)	Nov 25, 1920	17 years, 126 days	K of C Hall, Terre Haute, Pennsylvania, U.S.	
11	Loss	10–1	Whitey Morrett	NWS	6	Nov 8, 1920	17 years, 109 days	Heuck's Opera House, Cincinnati, Ohio, U.S.	
10	Win	10–0	Jimmy Burns	TKO	9 (10)	Nov 1, 1920	17 years, 102 days	K of C Hall, Terre Haute, Pennsylvania, U.S.	
9	Win	9–0	Artie Armstrong	NWS	10	Oct 4, 1920	17 years, 74 days	K of C Hall, Terre Haute, Pennsylvania, U.S.	
8	Win	8–0	Dutch Davison	KO	3 (?)	Aug 2, 1920	17 years, 11 days	Muncie, Indiana, U.S.	
7	Win	7–0	Bruce Mickles	KO	2 (?)	Jul 26, 1920	17 years, 4 days	Clinton, Indiana, U.S.	
6	Win	6–0	Artie Armstrong	NWS	10	Jul 6, 1920	16 years, 350 days	Vincennes, Indiana, U.S.	
5	Win	5–0	Dave Templeton	KO	4 (?)	Jun 7, 1920	16 years, 321 days	Vincennes, Indiana, U.S.	
4	Win	4–0	Jack Edwards	TKO	2 (?)	May 24, 1920	16 years, 307 days	Campbell's Auditorium, Muncie, Indiana, U.S.	
3	Win	3–0	Walter Gering	TKO	4 (?)	Mar 15, 1920	16 years, 237 days	Terre Haute, Pennsylvania, U.S.	
2	Win	2–0	Everett Shepherd	KO	3 (4)	Feb 16, 1920	16 years, 209 days	K of C Hall, Terre Haute, Pennsylvania, U.S.	
1	Win	1–0	Dave Templeton	PTS	3	Jan 25, 1920	16 years, 187 days	K of C Hall, Terre Haute, Pennsylvania, U.S.	

Achievements
Vacant Title last held by Joe Lynch	NBA World Bantamweight Champion; June 24, 1927 – May 18, 1928; Stripped	Vacant Title next held by Bushy Graham
