= Abe Goldstein =

American boxer (1898–1977)

- Goldstein as a young boxer, c. 1918

Personal information
- Nickname: The Pride of the Ghetto
- Born: Abraham Attell Goldstein; September 10, 1898 New York City, New York, U.S.
- Died: February 12, 1977 (aged 78) New York City, New York, U.S.
- Height: 5 ft 5 in (1.65 m)
- Weight: Bantamweight

Boxing career
- Stance: Orthodox

Boxing record
- Total fights: 136; with the inclusion of newspaper decisions
- Wins: 102
- Win by KO: 35
- Losses: 24
- Draws: 9
- No contests: 1

Abe Goldstein (September 10, 1898 – February 12, 1977) was an American Undisputed World Bantamweight Champion boxer from New York known as the Pride of the Ghetto. He defeated Joe Lynch to become World Bantamweight champion on March 21, 1924, in Madison Square Garden, and was ranked the #5 bantamweight of all time by boxing Manager Charley Rose. He worked with the famous New York trainer Ray Arcel.

He successfully defended the title twice the year he took it, against Charles Ledoux and Tommy Ryan, before losing to Eddie "Cannonball" Martin in a 15-round decision on December 19, 1924. He had an unsuccessful attempt at the American Flyweight Championship early in his career against Johnny Buff and fought Pancho Villa, another holder of the American Flyweight Title in a non-title match.

== Early life and career ==
Goldstein was born in the slums of New York's Lower East Side on September 10, 1898, and spent some of his early years in an orphanage. His widowed mother made a living wheeling a pushcart in New York's Lower East Side, occasionally having to steal rolls from local bakeries to feed her family. He got his earliest ring experience with Nat Osk, the athletic instructor at the 92nd YMHA of Manhattan, who taught him elementary boxing. After fighting for three years as an amateur flyweight, Willie Lewis, who usually acted as his promoter, took note of his potential and developed him into an exceptional young contender. He won a series of amateur titles, including the Metropolitan, New York State, New England, Middle Atlantic, and National Titles for amateurs at the weight of 112 pounds. Ray Arcel, his exceptional trainer, began working with him even before he turned professional in 1916. Unlike several of Arcel's bantamweight fighters, Goldstein rarely had trouble making weight, a trick (problem) for many bantams. According to Arcel, "The one thing we had on our side was that Abe could eat a ton of bricks and never weigh more than 116 pounds."

In his first forty professional fights, he was reputed to have lost only five times by points decisions. Of Goldstein's first 40 bouts, 16 wins were by knockout.

He had several losses in 1920. One was to Paddy Owens on September 18, 1920, in a twelve-round points decision in Waterbury, Connecticut. Of his August 21, 1920, twelve-round loss by newspaper decision to Young Montreal in Hartford, Connecticut, the Boston Post wrote that Montreal was "far and away the cleverer boxer" and his hooks, "took a heavy toll from Goldstein's strength." Perhaps his most important early loss was in a non-title fight with bantamweight champion Joe Lynch in an eleventh-round knockout in Madison Square Garden on November 5, 1920, when Goldstein was substituting for another boxer. A left and a right to the chin of Goldstein ended the bout, but the two would meet again four years later.

=== American Flyweight Championship against Johnny Buff and Filipino boxer Pancho Villa ===
On March 31, 1921, he received what might be considered his first title shot against American flyweight champion Johnny Buff, but was knocked out in the second round at the Manhattan Casino in New York. Patsy Haley, one of America's most accomplished referees in the New York area, officiated.

==== Match with Pancho Villa ====
On November 16, 1922, he lost to Pancho Villa, the Filipino holder of the American Flyweight Championship, in a fifteen-round bout in Madison Square Garden by unanimous decision. The bout drew an impressive but rowdy audience. Villa won the decision by "decisively outpointing and outpunching his heavier rival," and appeared to be the aggressor in most of the rounds, with the possible exception of the fifth, where Goldstein scored with two left hooks. Around 12,000 viewed the bout, with a very large crowd being turned away. The unruly crowd tore off one of the doors of the stadium and booed and hissed at Goldstein's passiveness and lack of response to Villa's aggression, but Goldstein may have been wise to fight a purely defensive bout. One source noted that the bout was not a title match, as Goldstein weighed in at 115 1/2 against Villa's 110 pounds. The two had previously met in a twelve-round bout on June 7, which ended in a newspaper decision for Goldstein, which surprised many who noted Villa's dominance in their November 16 match.

=== Match with Joe Burman, interim bantamweight champion ===
On October 19, 1923, he defeated Joe Burman in a twelve-round decision at Madison Square Garden. Goldstein was substituting for Joe Lynch, who had been stripped of his title, partly for avoiding the match against Goldstein. Burman had been temporarily assigned the Bantamweight Championship in New York State as a result of Lynch's being stripped of the title. Goldstein was given five rounds, Burman three, and the rest were declared even. Later discussion by the New York State Athletic Commission restored the bantamweight title to Lynch, though Goldstein would soon have a shot at his crown.

== World Bantamweight Champ, 1923 ==
On October 29, 1923, Goldstein defeated Joe Burman in a close twelve round points decision in Madison Square Garden, though according to Ray Arcel, Goldstein had not fully trained for the bout. By many accounts, the bout was a Bantamweight Title Match, but since Burman only held the title as a result of it being temporarily stripped from Joe Lynch, who had refused to meet Burman in a title match on the same date, most sources attribute Goldstein's victory over Lynch five months later as the date when he officially took the World Bantamweight Title. Goldstein's victory over Burman, whom most considered a valid World Bantamweight Contender, gave Goldstein a far stronger claim to contend for the World Bantamweight Championship, and Arcell considered it a critical victory in building his reputation as a championship-caliber trainer as well.

Of his win against Joe Lynch on March 21, 1924, the Wilkes-Barre Evening News wrote, "Lynch fought a game, courageous battle, but he was not equal to the task of warding off the relentless attack of his challenger, who gave a splendid exhibition of scientific boxing." Though Goldstein landed repeatedly with his left and landed many solid blows that rocked Lynch, the reigning champion was never knocked down and never appeared to be at risk of being knocked out. Ray Arcel, one of the most skilled and accomplished boxing trainers in history, was in Goldstein's corner for the fight. Arcel considered Goldstein's victory as one of his great achievements, as Goldstein was the first boxer he had trained to a World Championship. He noted that during training for the fight, he and Goldstein "played together, laughed together, and wept together." Both were Jewish and had roots in New York's Lower East Side, Arcel being from Harlem.

The News noted that the capacity crowd of 14,900 at Madison Square Garden witnessed a "stirring, hard fought battle with Goldstein assuming the lead almost from the start, and continuing to pile up points throughout the fifteen rounds." The News gave only the tenth round decisively to Lynch, who, for the first time in the battle, landed his signature right hand to the chin of Goldstein. The result of the fight was not a foregone conclusion in the minds of most fans, as Wilmington's Evening Journal noted that Lynch had been the big favorite on the night of the match.

== World Bantamweight defenses ==
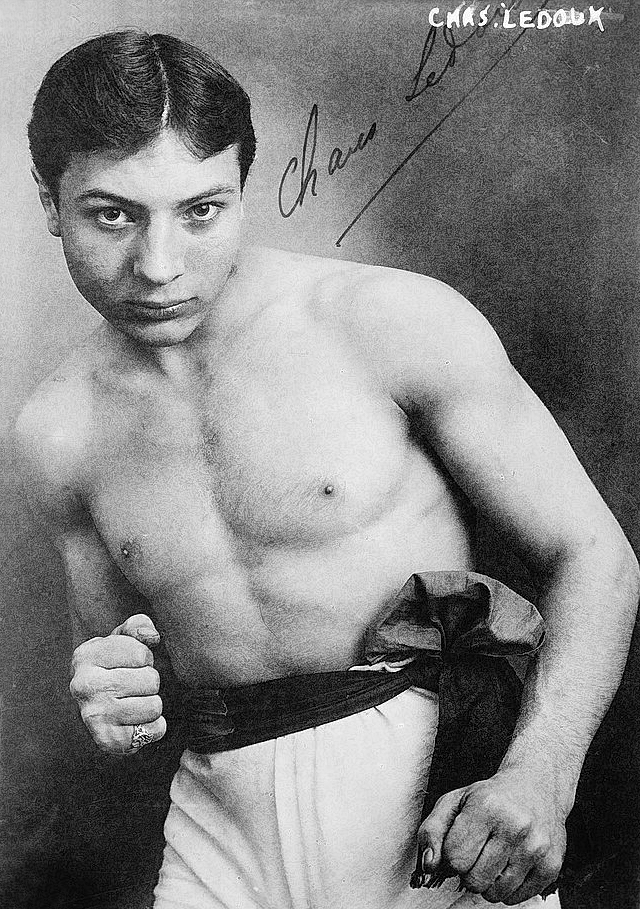
Charles Ledoux

One of his critical title defenses was a fifteen-round Unanimous Decision against Charles Ledoux on July 16, 1924, at New York's Metropolitan Velodrome. Famed American sportswriter Damon Runyan wrote of the fight in his typically humorous style that most of the folks in the audience "expected to see Charles Ledoux expire of senility and Goldstein's punches long before the fifteenth." Ledoux was thirty-one at the time of the bout, considerably older for a boxer, compared to Goldstein's more youthful twenty-five. Ledoux had reigned for ten years as European Bantamweight Champion and considered retirement after the bout, but did not. The Winnipeg Tribune called the fight, "a tame, uninteresting fifteen-round exhibition", and noted that "The crowd, a scant 5000, booed the exhibition and hissed the decision", perhaps anticipating a more rousing spectacle. The Tribune noted, as had Runyon, that Ledoux had been down twice in the bout and was very game to last the full fifteen rounds.

He defended his title again against Tommy Ryan on September 8, 1924, in Long Island City, in Queens, New York, in a fifteen-round points decision. The referee was again the renowned Patsy Haley, who officiated at many important New York title fights and had fought primarily as a lightweight in New York at the turn of the century. Goldstein had fought and defeated Ryan twice previously in non-title fights. In the simplest terms, "Goldstein had a wide and comfortable margin." According to the Reading Times Goldstein had a significant lead over Ryan after the seventh round. According to the Times, "In the eighteenth round, Goldstein, working from long range, swung his battery of rights and lefts into action and drove the reeling Ryan about the ring punch-drunk and on the verge of a knockout." The Times also noted in the fifteenth round Ryan appeared close to a knockout but finished the round nonetheless.

On May 27, 1924, he atypically lost a ten-round points decision to Johnny Shepherd in Boston. Shepherd was awarded eight of the ten rounds. His opponent's lefts and countering rights gained the winning edge in the points awarded by the judges.

== Losing of Bantamweight Title ==
On December 19, 1924, he lost the World Bantamweight title to Eddie "Cannonball" Martin in a split decision in fifteen rounds before a crowd of 15,000 at New York's Madison Square Garden. Some newspapers wrote that the close bout should have gone to Goldstein and that the match was marred by too much clinching. Though both boxers, particularly Martin, showed aggressiveness in the bout, one newspaper noted, "Goldstein weakened toward the end, and it was only by dint of holding that he saved himself from the Cannonballs' rushes." Though "in round twelve Abe's right reached Martin's jaw half a dozen times", Martin seemed to last through Goldstein's best shots. One source characterized the referee's ruling in the bout as a "razor-thin decision."

The Lincoln Star wrote that Goldstein had an advantage in the first six rounds, particularly the third, but that Martin showed aggression and put Goldstein on the defensive so often that he eventually won the decision. Goldstein's trainer, Arcel, believed that his fighter's dominance in the first six rounds, particularly the third when he knocked down Martin, should have been enough for a decision, but he admitted that the fight was close.

The Ashbury Park Press, agreeing with the decision for Martin, wrote that Goldstein appeared to be on the defensive too often and clinched repeatedly as a reaction to Martin's onslaught. The Press wrote that "although the former champion (Goldstein) was not seriously hurt by the fighting, he was unable to return it in any measure and constantly looped his fingers about his opponent's arms to save himself punishment. Most telling was the line by the Press that "round after round saw him (Martin) forcing the fighting, giving double for what he received." In short, "Goldstein lost his belt by taking the defensive and acquiescing to the infighting methods that Martin employed."

== Boxing after title loss ==
He lost 20 of the 23 fights he boxed after losing the World Bantamweight title to Eddie Martin. Facing some top-notch talent, he boxed several opponents who would eventually hold world titles.

On March 19, 1925, immediately after his loss to Martin, Goldstein defeated Tommy Milton in twelve rounds at the Rink Sporting Club in New York. Goldstein landed the heavier blows, particularly a vicious right to the chin of Tommy in the seventh round that put him on the mat for a count of nine.

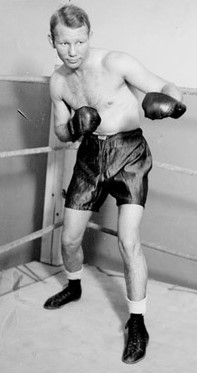
Bud Taylor, 1927 Bantamweight Champion

Goldstein boxed Charles "Bud" Taylor three times after 1925. Goldstein lost twice with one no decision. An important loss to Taylor was on May 26, 1925, consisting of ten rounds in Queensborough Stadium in New York. The Pittsburgh Post characterized the bout as the "best performance of his (Taylor's) career" and identified Taylor as "the class of the bantamweight division."

Taylor would take the bantamweight title in June 1927, one month after his third fight with Goldstein. Of his May 4, 1927, ten-round loss to Taylor at New York's Colliseum, the Decatur Herald wrote that Taylor was "easily the master of the bout, but suffered some hard punches from the former title holder (Goldstein), and several times the crowd was plainly cheering for a Goldstein victory.

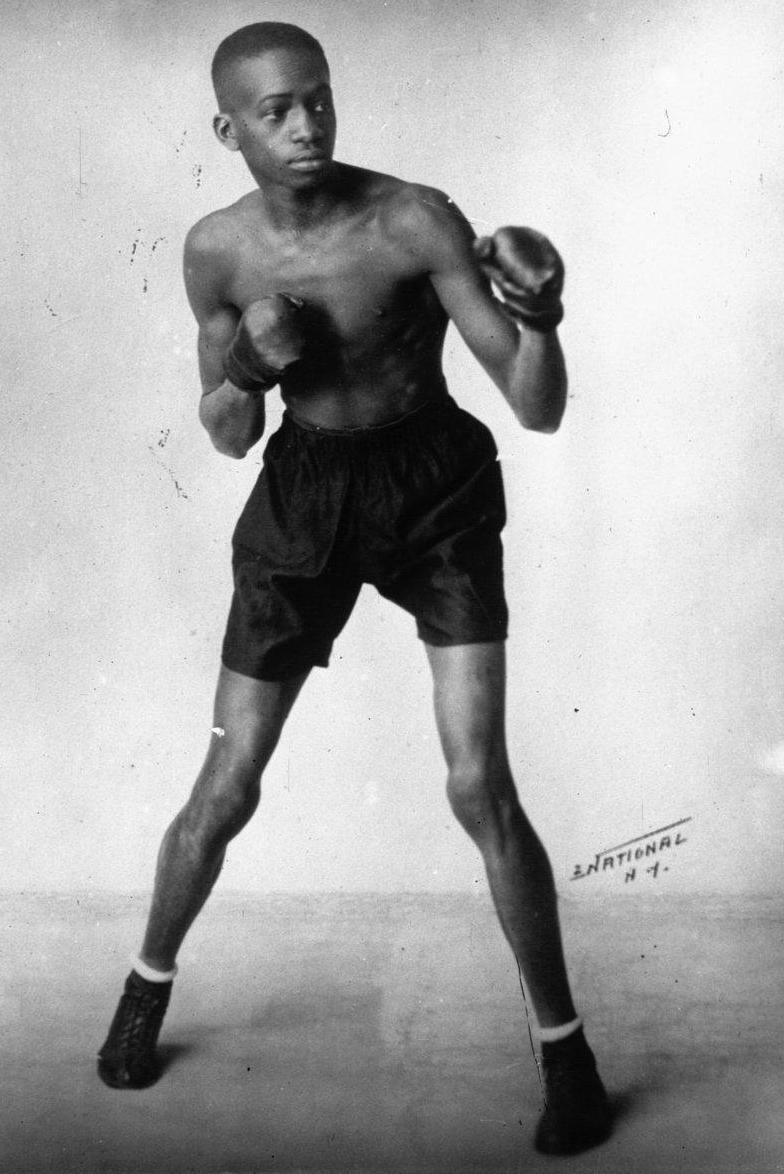
Al Brown, Bantamweight Champion

On April 23, 1926, Goldstein beat Hall of Fame Black Panamanian boxer Panama Al Brown in ten rounds in New York. The fighting was described as fast-paced. As a result of a reach disadvantage, Brown, being four inches taller at 5' 9", Goldstein fought at long distance, which improved his chances at defense. Though Brown had the advantage during in-fighting, Goldstein seemed to have a points advantage from the early rounds, and his lead was never in question throughout the bout. Brown, a black Panamanian, would become the first Latin American to hold the NYSAC World Bantamweight Title three years later in 1929.

Of his December 14, 1926, ten-round unanimous decision at the Armory in Wilkes-Barre, Pennsylvania, with local boxer Johnny Dunn, the Wilkes-Barre Record wrote that the crowd was unhappy with the verdict, and probably would have preferred at least a draw. "There were no knockdowns", with both boxers fighting a fast and clean battle. The crowd was probably displeased with both boxers "throwing punches at each other from all angles without inflicting damage."

== Last bout ==
On June 25, 1927, Goldstein's had his last professional fight with Filipino boxer Ignazio Fernandez in a seventh-round TKO in Chicago, Illinois. Fernandez dropped Goldstein for a count of nine with strong right crosses to the chin in the sixth round. The bout was called by referee Davey Miller in the seventh when Fernandez again dropped Goldstein with a new flurry of rights."

Goldstein retired that year. By 1929, after the collapse of Wall Street, he was forced to drive a cab to make a living. His professional record, according to BoxRec, counting newspaper decisions, for 135 bouts, was 101 wins, 24 losses, 9 draws, and 1 no contest. He had an impressive thirty-five knockouts among his wins.

He died February 12, 1977, in New York.

== Professional boxing record ==
All information in this section is derived from BoxRec, unless otherwise stated.

=== Official Record ===
136 fights	70 wins	16 losses
By knockout	35	4
By decision	35	12
Draws	7	
No contests	1	
Newspaper decisions/draws	42	

All newspaper decisions are officially regarded as “no decision” bouts and are not counted in the win/loss/draw column.

No.	Result	Record	Opponent	Type	Round	Date	Age	Location	Notes
136	Loss	70–16–7 (43)	Ignacio Fernandez	TKO	7 (10)	Jun 24, 1927	28 years, 287 days	Wrigley Field, Chicago, Illinois, U.S.	
135	Win	70–15–7 (43)	Willie Spencer	KO	2 (10)	May 27, 1927	28 years, 259 days	Valley Arena, Holyoke, Massachusetts, U.S.	
134	Loss	69–15–7 (43)	Bud Taylor	UD	10	May 3, 1927	28 years, 235 days	Coliseum, Chicago, Illinois, U.S.	
133	Win	69–14–7 (43)	Pete Sarmiento	PTS	8	Mar 26, 1927	28 years, 197 days	Coliseum, Chicago, Illinois, U.S.	
132	Draw	68–14–7 (43)	Pete Sarmiento	NWS	12	Feb 28, 1927	28 years, 171 days	Youngstown, Ohio, U.S.	
131	Win	68–14–7 (42)	Charlie Pinto	PTS	10	Feb 14, 1927	28 years, 157 days	Broadway Auditorium, Buffalo, New York, U.S.	
130	Loss	67–14–7 (42)	Joey Russell	NWS	12	Jan 10, 1927	28 years, 122 days	Laurel Garden, Newark, New Jersey, U.S.	
129	Win	67–14–7 (41)	Johnny Dunn	UD	10	Dec 14, 1926	28 years, 95 days	South Main Street Armory, Wilkes-Barre, Pennsylvania, U.S.	
128	Win	66–14–7 (41)	San Sanchez	NWS	10	Dec 6, 1926	28 years, 87 days	New Polo A.A., Perth Amboy, New Jersey, U.S.	
127	Win	66–14–7 (40)	Panama Al Brown	PTS	10	Apr 23, 1926	27 years, 225 days	Pioneer Sporting Club, New York City, New York, U.S.	
126	Loss	65–14–7 (40)	Bud Taylor	NWS	10	Apr 8, 1926	27 years, 210 days	Hippodrome, Terre Haute, Indiana, U.S.	
125	Loss	65–14–7 (39)	Chick Suggs	PTS	10	Feb 5, 1926	27 years, 148 days	Madison Square Garden, New York City, New York, U.S.	
124	Loss	65–13–7 (39)	Dominick Petrone	PTS	12	Jan 11, 1926	27 years, 123 days	Uptown Lenox S.C., New York City, New York, U.S.	
123	Loss	65–12–7 (39)	Young Nationalista	PTS	10	Nov 10, 1925	27 years, 61 days	Armory, Portland, Oregon, U.S.	
122	Win	65–11–7 (39)	Chuck Hellman	PTS	10	Oct 22, 1925	27 years, 42 days	State Armory, San Francisco, California, U.S.	
121	Win	64–11–7 (39)	Teddy Silva	PTS	10	Oct 13, 1925	27 years, 33 days	Arena, Vernon, California, U.S.	
120	Loss	63–11–7 (39)	Dixie LaHood	UD	12	Oct 8, 1925	27 years, 28 days	Broadway Theater, Butte, Montana, U.S.	
119	Loss	63–10–7 (39)	Bushy Graham	PTS	8	Jul 23, 1925	26 years, 316 days	Velodrome, New York City, New York, U.S.	
118	Loss	63–9–7 (39)	Bud Taylor	PTS	10	May 26, 1925	26 years, 258 days	Queensboro Stadium, Long Island City, New York, U.S.	
117	Win	63–8–7 (39)	Buck Josephs	NWS	12	May 6, 1925	26 years, 238 days	1st Regiment Armory, Newark, New Jersey, U.S.	
116	Win	63–8–7 (38)	Joey Russell	TKO	3 (12)	Apr 13, 1925	26 years, 215 days	Laurel Garden, Newark, New Jersey, U.S.	
115	Win	62–8–7 (38)	Al Felder	KO	9 (10)	Apr 1, 1925	26 years, 203 days	Manhattan S.C., New York City, New York, U.S.	
114	Win	61–8–7 (38)	Tommy Milton	PTS	12	Mar 19, 1925	26 years, 190 days	Rink S.C., New York City, New York, U.S.	
113	Loss	60–8–7 (38)	Eddie Martin	SD	15	Dec 19, 1924	26 years, 100 days	Madison Square Garden, New York City, New York, U.S.	Lost NYSAC, NBA, and The Ring bantamweight titles
112	Win	60–7–7 (38)	Eddie Shea	NWS	10	Nov 14, 1924	26 years, 65 days	East Chicago, Indiana, U.S.	
111	Win	60–7–7 (37)	Tommy Ryan	PTS	15	Sep 8, 1924	25 years, 364 days	Queensboro A.C., Long Island City, New York City, New York, U.S.	Retained NYSAC, NBA, The Ring bantamweight titles
110	Win	59–7–7 (37)	Charles Ledoux	UD	15	Jul 16, 1924	25 years, 310 days	Metropolitan Velodrome, New York City, New York, U.S.	Retained NYSAC, NBA, The Ring bantamweight titles
109	Win	58–7–7 (37)	Tommy Murray	NWS	12	Jun 20, 1924	25 years, 284 days	Portland, Maine, U.S.	
108	Loss	58–7–7 (36)	Johnny Sheppard	PTS	10	May 26, 1924	25 years, 259 days	Mechanics Building, Boston, Massachusetts, U.S.	
107	Win	58–6–7 (36)	Clarence Rosen	NWS	10	May 5, 1924	25 years, 238 days	Fair Grounds Coliseum, Detroit, Michigan, U.S.	NYSAC, NBA, The Ring bantamweight titles at stake; (via KO only)
106	Win	58–6–7 (35)	Tommy Murray	NWS	12	Apr 7, 1924	25 years, 210 days	Coliseum, Toledo, Ohio, U.S.	
105	Win	58–6–7 (34)	Joe Lynch	PTS	15	Mar 21, 1924	25 years, 193 days	Madison Square Garden, New York City, New York, U.S.	Retained NYSAC bantamweight title; Won NBA and inaugural The Ring bantamweight titles
104	Win	57–6–7 (34)	Danny Edwards	PTS	10	Feb 19, 1924	25 years, 162 days	Pioneer Sporting Club, New York City, New York, U.S.	
103	Win	56–6–7 (34)	Wilbur Cohen	PTS	10	Jan 8, 1924	25 years, 120 days	Pioneer S.C., New York City, New York, U.S.	
102	Win	55–6–7 (34)	Joe Burman	PTS	12	Oct 19, 1923	25 years, 39 days	Madison Square Garden, New York City, New York, U.S.	Won NYSAC bantamweight title
101	Win	54–6–7 (34)	Johnny Naselle	TKO	2 (12)	Oct 15, 1923	25 years, 35 days	Lenox A.C., New York City, New York, U.S.	
100	Loss	53–6–7 (34)	Chick Suggs	PTS	10	Oct 5, 1923	25 years, 25 days	Casino, Fall River, Massachusetts, U.S.	
99	Win	53–5–7 (34)	Tommy Lynch	PTS	12	Oct 2, 1923	25 years, 22 days	Pioneer Sporting Club, New York City, New York, U.S.	
98	Win	52–5–7 (34)	Frankie Conway	PTS	10	Sep 4, 1923	24 years, 359 days	Queensboro Stadium, Long Island City, New York, U.S.	
97	Win	51–5–7 (34)	Danny Edwards	TKO	14 (15)	Aug 14, 1923	24 years, 338 days	Queensboro Stadium, Long Island City, New York, U.S.	
96	Win	50–5–7 (34)	Wilbur Cohen	PTS	12	Jul 27, 1923	24 years, 320 days	Steeplechase A.A., Rockaway Beach, New York City, New York, U.S.	
95	Win	49–5–7 (34)	Kid Rash	NWS	8	Jul 16, 1923	24 years, 309 days	Bacharach Ball Park, Atlantic City, New Jersey, U.S.	
94	Win	49–5–7 (33)	Frankie Daly	PTS	12	Jun 21, 1923	24 years, 284 days	Kingsboro Stadium, New York City, New York, U.S.	
93	Win	48–5–7 (33)	Tommy Ryan	NWS	10	Jun 4, 1923	24 years, 267 days	Motor Square Garden, Pittsburgh, Pennsylvania, U.S.	
92	Win	48–5–7 (32)	Willie Darcy	TKO	8 (12)	May 29, 1923	24 years, 261 days	Queensboro Stadium, Long Island City, New York City, New York, U.S.	
91	Win	47–5–7 (32)	Frankie Coster	PTS	10	May 11, 1923	24 years, 243 days	Arena, Syracuse, New York, U.S.	
90	Win	46–5–7 (32)	Frankie Coster	TKO	5 (?)	Apr 23, 1923	24 years, 225 days	Broadway Arena, New York City, New York, U.S.	
89	Loss	45–5–7 (32)	Peter Zivic	NWS	10	Mar 29, 1923	24 years, 200 days	Palisades Rink, McKeesport, Pennsylvania, U.S.	
88	Win	45–5–7 (31)	Tommy Ryan	NWS	10	Mar 1, 1923	24 years, 172 days	Palisades Rink, McKeesport, Pennsylvania, U.S.	
87	Win	45–5–7 (30)	Midget Mike Moran	NWS	10	Jan 29, 1923	24 years, 141 days	Motor Square Garden, Pittsburgh, Pennsylvania, U.S.	
86	Win	45–5–7 (29)	Frankie Daly	PTS	12	Jan 15, 1923	24 years, 127 days	Bolton Hall, Troy, New York, U.S.	
85	Win	44–5–7 (29)	Kid Rash	PTS	12	Dec 30, 1922	24 years, 111 days	Commonwealth Sporting Club, New York City, New York, U.S.	
84	Loss	43–5–7 (29)	Pancho Villa	UD	15	Nov 16, 1922	24 years, 20 days	Madison Square Garden, New York City, New York, U.S.	
83	Win	43–4–7 (29)	Johnny Gray	PTS	12	Sep 30, 1922	24 years, 20 days	Queensboro Stadium, Long Island City, New York City, New York, U.S.	
82	Win	42–4–7 (29)	Danny Edwards	NWS	12	Jul 25, 1922	23 years, 318 days	Oakland A.A., Jersey City, New Jersey, U.S.	
81	Win	42–4–7 (28)	Johnny Gray	PTS	12	Jul 14, 1922	23 years, 307 days	Palace of Joy, Coney Island, New York, U.S.	
80	Win	41–4–7 (28)	Billy Marlowe	KO	3 (12)	Jun 16, 1922	23 years, 279 days	Arena, Rockaway Beach, New York, U.S.	
79	Win	40–4–7 (28)	Pancho Villa	NWS	12	Jun 7, 1922	23 years, 270 days	Oakland A.A., Jersey City, New Jersey, U.S.	
78	Win	40–4–7 (27)	Frankie Genaro	PTS	4	May 19, 1922	23 years, 251 days	Madison Square Garden, New York City, New York, U.S.	
77	Win	39–4–7 (27)	Billy Mascott	KO	2 (10)	May 5, 1922	23 years, 237 days	Casino, Fall River, Massachusetts, U.S.	
76	Win	38–4–7 (27)	Johnny Sheppard	PTS	10	Apr 7, 1922	23 years, 209 days	Mechanics Building, Boston, Massachusetts, U.S.	
75	Win	37–4–7 (27)	Patsy Wallace	NWS	8	Mar 27, 1922	23 years, 198 days	Olympia A.C., Philadelphia, Pennsylvania, U.S.	
74	Win	37–4–7 (26)	George Marks	PTS	8	Mar 13, 1922	23 years, 184 days	Madison Square Garden, New York City, New York, U.S.	
73	Win	36–4–7 (26)	Johnny Gray	PTS	10	Mar 9, 1922	23 years, 180 days	Clermont Avenue Rink, New York City, New York, U.S.	
72	Win	35–4–7 (26)	Johnny Gray	PTS	12	Mar 4, 1922	23 years, 175 days	Clermont Avenue Rink, New York City, New York, U.S.	
71	Draw	34–4–7 (26)	Frankie Curry	PTS	12	Jan 28, 1922	23 years, 140 days	Commonwealth Sporting Club, New York City, New York, U.S.	
70	Win	34–4–6 (26)	Frankie Fay	KO	7 (?)	Jan 17, 1922	23 years, 129 days	Pioneer Sporting Club, New York City, New York, U.S.	
69	Win	33–4–6 (26)	Jack Perry	NWS	8	Jan 10, 1922	23 years, 122 days	Ice Palace, Philadelphia, Pennsylvania, U.S.	
68	Win	33–4–6 (25)	Kid Davis	TKO	6 (10)	Jan 6, 1922	23 years, 118 days	Madison Square Garden, New York City, New York, U.S.	
67	Win	32–4–6 (25)	Frankie Daly	PTS	10	Dec 9, 1921	23 years, 90 days	Pioneer Sporting Club, New York City, New York, U.S.	
66	Win	31–4–6 (25)	Harry London	PTS	12	Nov 28, 1921	23 years, 79 days	Star S.C., New York City, New York, U.S.	
65	Win	30–4–6 (25)	Battling Mack	NWS	8	Nov 15, 1921	23 years, 66 days	Ice Palace, Philadelphia, Pennsylvania, U.S.	
64	Draw	30–4–6 (24)	Terry Martin	PTS	12	Oct 24, 1921	23 years, 44 days	Broadway Arena, New York City, New York, U.S.	
63	Draw	30–4–5 (24)	Eddie O'Dowd	PTS	8	Oct 14, 1921	23 years, 34 days	Madison Square Garden, New York City, New York, U.S.	
62	Draw	30–4–4 (24)	Cowboy Eddie Anderson	PTS	12	Sep 27, 1921	23 years, 17 days	Palace of Joy, Coney Island, New York, U.S.	
61	Win	30–4–3 (24)	Paddy Owens	KO	2 (15)	Sep 15, 1921	23 years, 5 days	New Haven, Connecticut, U.S.	
60	Win	29–4–3 (24)	Philly Franchini	KO	5 (12)	Sep 9, 1921	22 years, 364 days	Palace of Joy, Coney Island, New York, U.S.	
59	Draw	28–4–3 (24)	Frankie Jerome	PTS	12	Jul 7, 1921	22 years, 300 days	Dyckman Oval, New York City, New York, U.S.	
58	Win	28–4–2 (24)	Earl Puryear	UD	12	Jul 1, 1921	22 years, 294 days	Arena, Rockaway Beach, New York City, New York, U.S.	
57	Win	27–4–2 (24)	Bobby Hughes	KO	12 (12)	Jun 10, 1921	22 years, 273 days	Steeplechase A.A., Rockaway Beach, New York City, New York, U.S.	
56	Win	26–4–2 (24)	Artie Simons	UD	12	May 18, 1921	22 years, 250 days	Pioneer Sporting Club, New York City, New York, U.S.	
55	Win	25–4–2 (24)	George Thompson	UD	12	Apr 29, 1921	22 years, 231 days	Arena, New York City, New York, U.S.	
54	Loss	24–4–2 (24)	Johnny Buff	TKO	2 (15)	Mar 31, 1921	22 years, 202 days	Manhattan Casino, New York City, New York, U.S.	For vacant American flyweight title
53	Win	24–3–2 (24)	Willie Burns	TKO	6 (10)	Mar 18, 1921	22 years, 189 days	Flatbush A.C., New York City, New York, U.S.	
52	Win	23–3–2 (24)	George Thompson	PTS	10	Mar 4, 1921	22 years, 175 days	Flatbush A.C., New York City, New York, U.S.	
51	Loss	22–3–2 (24)	Kid Williams	NWS	8	Feb 21, 1921	22 years, 164 days	Olympia A.C., Philadelphia, Pennsylvania, U.S.	
50	Win	22–3–2 (23)	Frankie Daly	PTS	10	Feb 15, 1921	22 years, 158 days	Madison Square Garden, New York City, New York, U.S.	
49	Win	21–3–2 (23)	Patsy Wallace	KO	7 (15)	Feb 11, 1921	22 years, 154 days	Pioneer Sporting Club, New York City, New York, U.S.	
48	Win	20–3–2 (23)	Hank McGovern	NWS	8	Jan 31, 1921	22 years, 143 days	Olympia A.C., Philadelphia, Pennsylvania, U.S.	
47	Win	20–3–2 (22)	Patsy Johnson	NWS	10	Jan 25, 1921	22 years, 137 days	Arena, Trenton, New Jersey, U.S.	
46	Win	20–3–2 (21)	Battling Mack	NWS	6	Jan 10, 1921	22 years, 122 days	Olympia A.C., Philadelphia, Pennsylvania, U.S.	
45	Win	20–3–2 (20)	Tommy Murray	TKO	5 (6)	Dec 25, 1920	22 years, 106 days	Olympia A.C., Philadelphia, Pennsylvania, U.S.	
44	Win	19–3–2 (20)	Jack Perry	NWS	6	Dec 13, 1920	22 years, 94 days	Olympia A.C., Philadelphia, Pennsylvania, U.S.	
43	Win	19–3–2 (19)	Willie Spencer	NWS	6	Nov 25, 1920	22 years, 76 days	Olympia A.C., Philadelphia, Pennsylvania, U.S.	
42	Loss	19–3–2 (18)	Joe Lynch	KO	11 (15)	Nov 5, 1920	22 years, 56 days	Madison Square Garden, New York City, New York, U.S.	
41	Win	19–2–2 (18)	Patsy Wallace	PTS	15	Sep 28, 1920	22 years, 18 days	Madison Square Garden, New York City, New York, U.S.	
40	Loss	18–2–2 (18)	Paddy Owens	PTS	12	Sep 18, 1920	22 years, 8 days	Phoenix Arena, Waterbury, Connecticut, U.S.	
39	Win	18–1–2 (18)	Young Montreal	NWS	12	Aug 21, 1920	21 years, 346 days	Wethersfield Baseball Grounds, Hartford, Connecticut, U.S.	
38	Win	18–1–2 (17)	Joey Leon	TKO	2 (12)	Aug 3, 1920	21 years, 328 days	Bayonne A.A., Bayonne, New Jersey, U.S.	
37	Win	17–1–2 (17)	Eddie Fletcher	NWS	12	Jul 16, 1920	21 years, 310 days	Bayonne, New Jersey, U.S.	
36	Loss	17–1–2 (16)	Johnny Buff	NWS	12	Jul 6, 1920	21 years, 300 days	Armory A.A., Jersey City, New Jersey, U.S.	
35	Draw	17–1–2 (15)	Barney Snyder	PTS	12	May 22, 1920	21 years, 255 days	Phoenix Arena, Waterbury, Connecticut, U.S.	
34	Draw	17–1–1 (15)	Paddy Owens	PTS	12	May 8, 1920	21 years, 241 days	Phoenix Arena, Waterbury, Connecticut, U.S.	
33	Win	17–1 (15)	Bobby Hansen	TKO	7 (12)	Apr 24, 1920	21 years, 227 days	Phoenix Arena, Waterbury, Connecticut, U.S.	
32	Win	16–1 (15)	Harry Martin	TKO	1 (6)	Apr 23, 1920	21 years, 226 days	4th Regiment Armory, Jersey City, New Jersey, U.S.	
31	Win	15–1 (15)	Mike Dundee	KO	1 (?)	Apr 19, 1920	21 years, 222 days	White Plains, New York, U.S.	
30	Win	14–1 (15)	Joe Ryder	TKO	8 (12)	Apr 17, 1920	21 years, 220 days	Phoenix Arena, Waterbury, Connecticut, U.S.	
29	Win	13–1 (15)	Billy Fitzsimmons	KO	1 (?)	Mar 1, 1920	21 years, 173 days	Newark, New Jersey, U.S.	Precise date unknown at this time
28	Win	12–1 (15)	Al Ziemer	TKO	6 (6)	Feb 25, 1920	21 years, 168 days	Newark Athletic Club, Newark, New Jersey, U.S.	
27	Win	11–1 (15)	Pinky Brown	KO	4 (6)	Feb 14, 1920	21 years, 157 days	New York A.C., New York City, New York, U.S.	
26	Loss	10–1 (15)	Harvey Crosby	NWS	8	Jul 3, 1918	19 years, 296 days	Spring A.C., West Hoboken, New Jersey, U.S.	
25	Win	10–1 (14)	Harvey Crosby	NWS	6	Jul 2, 1918	19 years, 295 days	United States of America	
24	Win	10–1 (13)	Patsy Wallace	NWS	6	Apr 29, 1918	19 years, 231 days	Olympia A.C., Philadelphia, Pennsylvania, U.S.	
23	Win	10–1 (12)	Patsy Wallace	NWS	6	Apr 8, 1918	19 years, 210 days	Olympia A.C., Philadelphia, Pennsylvania, U.S.	
22	Win	10–1 (11)	Young Warren	KO	6 (?)	Sep 2, 1917	18 years, 357 days	New York City, New York, U.S.	Precise date unknown at this time
21	Win	9–1 (11)	Marshall Watier	KO	6 (?)	Sep 1, 1917	18 years, 356 days	New York City, New York, U.S.	Precise date unknown at this time
20	Draw	8–1 (11)	Terry Miller	NWS	10	Aug 31, 1917	18 years, 355 days	New Polo A.C., New York City, New York, U.S.	
19	Loss	8–1 (10)	Patsy Finnegan	KO	7 (?)	Jun 18, 1917	18 years, 281 days	Harlem S.C., New York City, New York, U.S.	
18	Win	8–0 (10)	Tommy Geary	NWS	10	May 26, 1917	18 years, 258 days	New York City, New York, U.S.	
17	Win	8–0 (9)	Kid Rash	NWS	10	Apr 25, 1917	18 years, 227 days	New York City, New York, U.S.	Precise date unknown at this time
16	Win	8–0 (8)	Jack Rath	NWS	6	Mar 27, 1917	18 years, 198 days	Hunts Point Palace, New York City, New York, U.S.	Precise date unknown at this time
15	ND	8–0 (7)	Johnny Monroe	ND	10	Mar 9, 1917	18 years, 180 days	Harlem S.C., New York City, New York, U.S.	
14	Win	8–0 (6)	Terry Miller	NWS	10	Feb 25, 1917	18 years, 168 days	New York City, New York, U.S.	Precise date unknown at this time
13	Win	8–0 (5)	Jack Sullivan	KO	2 (?)	Jan 29, 1917	18 years, 141 days	Olympic A.C., New York City, New York, U.S.	
12	Win	7–0 (5)	Joey Leonard	NWS	10	Jan 25, 1917	18 years, 137 days	New York City, New York, U.S.	Precise date unknown at this time
11	Win	7–0 (4)	Joe Greenfield	NWS	10	Dec 16, 1916	18 years, 97 days	New York City, New York, U.S.	
10	Win	7–0 (3)	Allie Kennedy	KO	2 (?)	Dec 8, 1916	18 years, 89 days	New York City, New York, U.S.	
9	Win	6–0 (3)	Kid Rago	KO	9 (?)	Dec 1, 1916	18 years, 82 days	New York City, New York, U.S.	Precise date unknown at this time
8	Win	5–0 (3)	Young Joe Dundee	KO	2 (?)	Nov 20, 1916	18 years, 71 days	New York City, New York, U.S.	
7	Win	4–0 (3)	Murray Perkle	NWS	10	Nov 13, 1916	18 years, 64 days	Olympic A.C., New York City, New York, U.S.	
6	Win	4–0 (2)	Tommy Fritz	KO	8 (?)	Oct 1, 1916	18 years, 21 days	New York City, New York, U.S.	Precise date unknown at this time
5	Loss	3–0 (2)	Tommy Geary	NWS	10	Sep 25, 1916	18 years, 15 days	Olympic A.C., New York City, New York, U.S.	
4	Win	3–0 (1)	Young Shindine	KO	6 (?)	Sep 1, 1916	17 years, 357 days	New York City, New York, U.S.	Precise date unknown at this time
3	Win	2–0 (1)	Smiling Willie	TKO	2 (10)	Aug 26, 1916	17 years, 351 days	Fairmont A.C., New York City, New York, U.S.	
2	Loss	1–0 (1)	Kid Rago	NWS	10	Aug 4, 1916	17 years, 329 days	New Polo A.C., New York City, New York, U.S.	
1	Win	1–0	Georgie Lewis	KO	8 (10)	Jun 30, 1916	17 years, 294 days	New Polo A.C., New York City, New York, U.S.	

=== Unofficial record ===
136 fights	102 wins	24 losses
By knockout	35	4
By decision	67	20
Draws	9	
No contests	1	

Record with the inclusion of newspaper decisions in the win/loss/draw column.

No.	Result	Record	Opponent	Type	Round	Date	Age	Location	Notes
136	Loss	102–24–9 (1)	Ignacio Fernandez	TKO	7 (10)	Jun 24, 1927	28 years, 287 days	Wrigley Field, Chicago, Illinois, U.S.	
135	Win	102–23–9 (1)	Willie Spencer	KO	2 (10)	May 27, 1927	28 years, 259 days	Valley Arena, Holyoke, Massachusetts, U.S.	
134	Loss	101–23–9 (1)	Bud Taylor	UD	10	May 3, 1927	28 years, 235 days	Coliseum, Chicago, Illinois, U.S.	
133	Win	101–22–9 (1)	Pete Sarmiento	PTS	8	Mar 26, 1927	28 years, 197 days	Coliseum, Chicago, Illinois, U.S.	
132	Draw	100–22–9 (1)	Pete Sarmiento	NWS	12	Feb 28, 1927	28 years, 171 days	Youngstown, Ohio, U.S.	
131	Win	100–22–8 (1)	Charlie Pinto	PTS	10	Feb 14, 1927	28 years, 157 days	Broadway Auditorium, Buffalo, New York, U.S.	
130	Loss	99–22–8 (1)	Joey Russell	NWS	12	Jan 10, 1927	28 years, 122 days	Laurel Garden, Newark, New Jersey, U.S.	
129	Win	99–21–8 (1)	Johnny Dunn	UD	10	Dec 14, 1926	28 years, 95 days	South Main Street Armory, Wilkes-Barre, Pennsylvania, U.S.	
128	Win	98–21–8 (1)	San Sanchez	NWS	10	Dec 6, 1926	28 years, 87 days	New Polo A.A., Perth Amboy, New Jersey, U.S.	
127	Win	97–21–8 (1)	Panama Al Brown	PTS	10	Apr 23, 1926	27 years, 225 days	Pioneer Sporting Club, New York City, New York, U.S.	
126	Loss	96–21–8 (1)	Bud Taylor	NWS	10	Apr 8, 1926	27 years, 210 days	Hippodrome, Terre Haute, Indiana, U.S.	
125	Loss	96–20–8 (1)	Chick Suggs	PTS	10	Feb 5, 1926	27 years, 148 days	Madison Square Garden, New York City, New York, U.S.	
124	Loss	96–19–8 (1)	Dominick Petrone	PTS	12	Jan 11, 1926	27 years, 123 days	Uptown Lenox S.C., New York City, New York, U.S.	
123	Loss	96–18–8 (1)	Young Nationalista	PTS	10	Nov 10, 1925	27 years, 61 days	Armory, Portland, Oregon, U.S.	
122	Win	96–17–8 (1)	Chuck Hellman	PTS	10	Oct 22, 1925	27 years, 42 days	State Armory, San Francisco, California, U.S.	
121	Win	95–17–8 (1)	Teddy Silva	PTS	10	Oct 13, 1925	27 years, 33 days	Arena, Vernon, California, U.S.	
120	Loss	94–17–8 (1)	Dixie LaHood	UD	12	Oct 8, 1925	27 years, 28 days	Broadway Theater, Butte, Montana, U.S.	
119	Loss	94–16–8 (1)	Bushy Graham	PTS	8	Jul 23, 1925	26 years, 316 days	Velodrome, New York City, New York, U.S.	
118	Loss	94–15–8 (1)	Bud Taylor	PTS	10	May 26, 1925	26 years, 258 days	Queensboro Stadium, Long Island City, New York, U.S.	
117	Win	94–14–8 (1)	Buck Josephs	NWS	12	May 6, 1925	26 years, 238 days	1st Regiment Armory, Newark, New Jersey, U.S.	
116	Win	93–14–8 (1)	Joey Russell	TKO	3 (12)	Apr 13, 1925	26 years, 215 days	Laurel Garden, Newark, New Jersey, U.S.	
115	Win	92–14–8 (1)	Al Felder	KO	9 (10)	Apr 1, 1925	26 years, 203 days	Manhattan S.C., New York City, New York, U.S.	
114	Win	91–14–8 (1)	Tommy Milton	PTS	12	Mar 19, 1925	26 years, 190 days	Rink S.C., New York City, New York, U.S.	
113	Loss	90–14–8 (1)	Eddie Martin	SD	15	Dec 19, 1924	26 years, 100 days	Madison Square Garden, New York City, New York, U.S.	Lost NYSAC, NBA, and The Ring bantamweight titles
112	Win	90–13–8 (1)	Eddie Shea	NWS	10	Nov 14, 1924	26 years, 65 days	East Chicago, Indiana, U.S.	
111	Win	89–13–8 (1)	Tommy Ryan	PTS	15	Sep 8, 1924	25 years, 364 days	Queensboro A.C., Long Island City, New York City, New York, U.S.	Retained NYSAC, NBA, The Ring bantamweight titles
110	Win	88–13–8 (1)	Charles Ledoux	UD	15	Jul 16, 1924	25 years, 310 days	Metropolitan Velodrome, New York City, New York, U.S.	Retained NYSAC, NBA, The Ring bantamweight titles
109	Win	87–13–8 (1)	Tommy Murray	NWS	12	Jun 20, 1924	25 years, 284 days	Portland, Maine, U.S.	
108	Loss	86–13–8 (1)	Johnny Sheppard	PTS	10	May 26, 1924	25 years, 259 days	Mechanics Building, Boston, Massachusetts, U.S.	
107	Win	86–12–8 (1)	Clarence Rosen	NWS	10	May 5, 1924	25 years, 238 days	Fair Grounds Coliseum, Detroit, Michigan, U.S.	NYSAC, NBA, The Ring bantamweight titles at stake; (via KO only)
106	Win	85–12–8 (1)	Tommy Murray	NWS	12	Apr 7, 1924	25 years, 210 days	Coliseum, Toledo, Ohio, U.S.	
105	Win	84–12–8 (1)	Joe Lynch	PTS	15	Mar 21, 1924	25 years, 193 days	Madison Square Garden, New York City, New York, U.S.	Retained NYSAC bantamweight title; Won NBA and inaugural The Ring bantamweight titles
104	Win	83–12–8 (1)	Danny Edwards	PTS	10	Feb 19, 1924	25 years, 162 days	Pioneer Sporting Club, New York City, New York, U.S.	
103	Win	82–12–8 (1)	Wilbur Cohen	PTS	10	Jan 8, 1924	25 years, 120 days	Pioneer S.C., New York City, New York, U.S.	
102	Win	81–12–8 (1)	Joe Burman	PTS	12	Oct 19, 1923	25 years, 39 days	Madison Square Garden, New York City, New York, U.S.	Won NYSAC bantamweight title
101	Win	80–12–8 (1)	Johnny Naselle	TKO	2 (12)	Oct 15, 1923	25 years, 35 days	Lenox A.C., New York City, New York, U.S.	
100	Loss	79–12–8 (1)	Chick Suggs	PTS	10	Oct 5, 1923	25 years, 25 days	Casino, Fall River, Massachusetts, U.S.	
99	Win	79–11–8 (1)	Tommy Lynch	PTS	12	Oct 2, 1923	25 years, 22 days	Pioneer Sporting Club, New York City, New York, U.S.	
98	Win	78–11–8 (1)	Frankie Conway	PTS	10	Sep 4, 1923	24 years, 359 days	Queensboro Stadium, Long Island City, New York, U.S.	
97	Win	77–11–8 (1)	Danny Edwards	TKO	14 (15)	Aug 14, 1923	24 years, 338 days	Queensboro Stadium, Long Island City, New York, U.S.	
96	Win	76–11–8 (1)	Wilbur Cohen	PTS	12	Jul 27, 1923	24 years, 320 days	Steeplechase A.A., Rockaway Beach, New York City, New York, U.S.	
95	Win	75–11–8 (1)	Kid Rash	NWS	8	Jul 16, 1923	24 years, 309 days	Bacharach Ball Park, Atlantic City, New Jersey, U.S.	
94	Win	74–11–8 (1)	Frankie Daly	PTS	12	Jun 21, 1923	24 years, 284 days	Kingsboro Stadium, New York City, New York, U.S.	
93	Win	73–11–8 (1)	Tommy Ryan	NWS	10	Jun 4, 1923	24 years, 267 days	Motor Square Garden, Pittsburgh, Pennsylvania, U.S.	
92	Win	72–11–8 (1)	Willie Darcy	TKO	8 (12)	May 29, 1923	24 years, 261 days	Queensboro Stadium, Long Island City, New York City, New York, U.S.	
91	Win	71–11–8 (1)	Frankie Coster	PTS	10	May 11, 1923	24 years, 243 days	Arena, Syracuse, New York, U.S.	
90	Win	70–11–8 (1)	Frankie Coster	TKO	5 (?)	Apr 23, 1923	24 years, 225 days	Broadway Arena, New York City, New York, U.S.	
89	Loss	69–11–8 (1)	Peter Zivic	NWS	10	Mar 29, 1923	24 years, 200 days	Palisades Rink, McKeesport, Pennsylvania, U.S.	
88	Win	69–10–8 (1)	Tommy Ryan	NWS	10	Mar 1, 1923	24 years, 172 days	Palisades Rink, McKeesport, Pennsylvania, U.S.	
87	Win	68–10–8 (1)	Midget Mike Moran	NWS	10	Jan 29, 1923	24 years, 141 days	Motor Square Garden, Pittsburgh, Pennsylvania, U.S.	
86	Win	67–10–8 (1)	Frankie Daly	PTS	12	Jan 15, 1923	24 years, 127 days	Bolton Hall, Troy, New York, U.S.	
85	Win	66–10–8 (1)	Kid Rash	PTS	12	Dec 30, 1922	24 years, 111 days	Commonwealth Sporting Club, New York City, New York, U.S.	
84	Loss	65–10–8 (1)	Pancho Villa	UD	15	Nov 16, 1922	24 years, 20 days	Madison Square Garden, New York City, New York, U.S.	
83	Win	65–9–8 (1)	Johnny Gray	PTS	12	Sep 30, 1922	24 years, 20 days	Queensboro Stadium, Long Island City, New York City, New York, U.S.	
82	Win	64–9–8 (1)	Danny Edwards	NWS	12	Jul 25, 1922	23 years, 318 days	Oakland A.A., Jersey City, New Jersey, U.S.	
81	Win	63–9–8 (1)	Johnny Gray	PTS	12	Jul 14, 1922	23 years, 307 days	Palace of Joy, Coney Island, New York, U.S.	
80	Win	62–9–8 (1)	Billy Marlowe	KO	3 (12)	Jun 16, 1922	23 years, 279 days	Arena, Rockaway Beach, New York, U.S.	
79	Win	61–9–8 (1)	Pancho Villa	NWS	12	Jun 7, 1922	23 years, 270 days	Oakland A.A., Jersey City, New Jersey, U.S.	
78	Win	60–9–8 (1)	Frankie Genaro	PTS	4	May 19, 1922	23 years, 251 days	Madison Square Garden, New York City, New York, U.S.	
77	Win	59–9–8 (1)	Billy Mascott	KO	2 (10)	May 5, 1922	23 years, 237 days	Casino, Fall River, Massachusetts, U.S.	
76	Win	58–9–8 (1)	Johnny Sheppard	PTS	10	Apr 7, 1922	23 years, 209 days	Mechanics Building, Boston, Massachusetts, U.S.	
75	Win	57–9–8 (1)	Patsy Wallace	NWS	8	Mar 27, 1922	23 years, 198 days	Olympia A.C., Philadelphia, Pennsylvania, U.S.	
74	Win	56–9–8 (1)	George Marks	PTS	8	Mar 13, 1922	23 years, 184 days	Madison Square Garden, New York City, New York, U.S.	
73	Win	55–9–8 (1)	Johnny Gray	PTS	10	Mar 9, 1922	23 years, 180 days	Clermont Avenue Rink, New York City, New York, U.S.	
72	Win	54–9–8 (1)	Johnny Gray	PTS	12	Mar 4, 1922	23 years, 175 days	Clermont Avenue Rink, New York City, New York, U.S.	
71	Draw	53–9–8 (1)	Frankie Curry	PTS	12	Jan 28, 1922	23 years, 140 days	Commonwealth Sporting Club, New York City, New York, U.S.	
70	Win	53–9–7 (1)	Frankie Fay	KO	7 (?)	Jan 17, 1922	23 years, 129 days	Pioneer Sporting Club, New York City, New York, U.S.	
69	Win	52–9–7 (1)	Jack Perry	NWS	8	Jan 10, 1922	23 years, 122 days	Ice Palace, Philadelphia, Pennsylvania, U.S.	
68	Win	51–9–7 (1)	Kid Davis	TKO	6 (10)	Jan 6, 1922	23 years, 118 days	Madison Square Garden, New York City, New York, U.S.	
67	Win	50–9–7 (1)	Frankie Daly	PTS	10	Dec 9, 1921	23 years, 90 days	Pioneer Sporting Club, New York City, New York, U.S.	
66	Win	49–9–7 (1)	Harry London	PTS	12	Nov 28, 1921	23 years, 79 days	Star S.C., New York City, New York, U.S.	
65	Win	48–9–7 (1)	Battling Mack	NWS	8	Nov 15, 1921	23 years, 66 days	Ice Palace, Philadelphia, Pennsylvania, U.S.	
64	Draw	47–9–7 (1)	Terry Martin	PTS	12	Oct 24, 1921	23 years, 44 days	Broadway Arena, New York City, New York, U.S.	
63	Draw	47–9–6 (1)	Eddie O'Dowd	PTS	8	Oct 14, 1921	23 years, 34 days	Madison Square Garden, New York City, New York, U.S.	
62	Draw	47–9–5 (1)	Cowboy Eddie Anderson	PTS	12	Sep 27, 1921	23 years, 17 days	Palace of Joy, Coney Island, New York, U.S.	
61	Win	47–9–4 (1)	Paddy Owens	KO	2 (15)	Sep 15, 1921	23 years, 5 days	New Haven, Connecticut, U.S.	
60	Win	46–9–4 (1)	Philly Franchini	KO	5 (12)	Sep 9, 1921	22 years, 364 days	Palace of Joy, Coney Island, New York, U.S.	
59	Draw	45–9–4 (1)	Frankie Jerome	PTS	12	Jul 7, 1921	22 years, 300 days	Dyckman Oval, New York City, New York, U.S.	
58	Win	45–9–3 (1)	Earl Puryear	UD	12	Jul 1, 1921	22 years, 294 days	Arena, Rockaway Beach, New York City, New York, U.S.	
57	Win	44–9–3 (1)	Bobby Hughes	KO	12 (12)	Jun 10, 1921	22 years, 273 days	Steeplechase A.A., Rockaway Beach, New York City, New York, U.S.	
56	Win	43–9–3 (1)	Artie Simons	UD	12	May 18, 1921	22 years, 250 days	Pioneer Sporting Club, New York City, New York, U.S.	
55	Win	42–9–3 (1)	George Thompson	UD	12	Apr 29, 1921	22 years, 231 days	Arena, New York City, New York, U.S.	
54	Loss	41–9–3 (1)	Johnny Buff	TKO	2 (15)	Mar 31, 1921	22 years, 202 days	Manhattan Casino, New York City, New York, U.S.	For vacant American flyweight title
53	Win	41–8–3 (1)	Willie Burns	TKO	6 (10)	Mar 18, 1921	22 years, 189 days	Flatbush A.C., New York City, New York, U.S.	
52	Win	40–8–3 (1)	George Thompson	PTS	10	Mar 4, 1921	22 years, 175 days	Flatbush A.C., New York City, New York, U.S.	
51	Loss	39–8–3 (1)	Kid Williams	NWS	8	Feb 21, 1921	22 years, 164 days	Olympia A.C., Philadelphia, Pennsylvania, U.S.	
50	Win	39–7–3 (1)	Frankie Daly	PTS	10	Feb 15, 1921	22 years, 158 days	Madison Square Garden, New York City, New York, U.S.	
49	Win	38–7–3 (1)	Patsy Wallace	KO	7 (15)	Feb 11, 1921	22 years, 154 days	Pioneer Sporting Club, New York City, New York, U.S.	
48	Win	37–7–3 (1)	Hank McGovern	NWS	8	Jan 31, 1921	22 years, 143 days	Olympia A.C., Philadelphia, Pennsylvania, U.S.	
47	Win	36–7–3 (1)	Patsy Johnson	NWS	10	Jan 25, 1921	22 years, 137 days	Arena, Trenton, New Jersey, U.S.	
46	Win	35–7–3 (1)	Battling Mack	NWS	6	Jan 10, 1921	22 years, 122 days	Olympia A.C., Philadelphia, Pennsylvania, U.S.	
45	Win	34–7–3 (1)	Tommy Murray	TKO	5 (6)	Dec 25, 1920	22 years, 106 days	Olympia A.C., Philadelphia, Pennsylvania, U.S.	
44	Win	33–7–3 (1)	Jack Perry	NWS	6	Dec 13, 1920	22 years, 94 days	Olympia A.C., Philadelphia, Pennsylvania, U.S.	
43	Win	32–7–3 (1)	Willie Spencer	NWS	6	Nov 25, 1920	22 years, 76 days	Olympia A.C., Philadelphia, Pennsylvania, U.S.	
42	Loss	31–7–3 (1)	Joe Lynch	KO	11 (15)	Nov 5, 1920	22 years, 56 days	Madison Square Garden, New York City, New York, U.S.	
41	Win	31–6–3 (1)	Patsy Wallace	PTS	15	Sep 28, 1920	22 years, 18 days	Madison Square Garden, New York City, New York, U.S.	
40	Loss	30–6–3 (1)	Paddy Owens	PTS	12	Sep 18, 1920	22 years, 8 days	Phoenix Arena, Waterbury, Connecticut, U.S.	
39	Win	30–5–3 (1)	Young Montreal	NWS	12	Aug 21, 1920	21 years, 346 days	Wethersfield Baseball Grounds, Hartford, Connecticut, U.S.	
38	Win	29–5–3 (1)	Joey Leon	TKO	2 (12)	Aug 3, 1920	21 years, 328 days	Bayonne A.A., Bayonne, New Jersey, U.S.	
37	Win	28–5–3 (1)	Eddie Fletcher	NWS	12	Jul 16, 1920	21 years, 310 days	Bayonne, New Jersey, U.S.	
36	Loss	27–5–3 (1)	Johnny Buff	NWS	12	Jul 6, 1920	21 years, 300 days	Armory A.A., Jersey City, New Jersey, U.S.	
35	Draw	27–4–3 (1)	Barney Snyder	PTS	12	May 22, 1920	21 years, 255 days	Phoenix Arena, Waterbury, Connecticut, U.S.	
34	Draw	27–4–2 (1)	Paddy Owens	PTS	12	May 8, 1920	21 years, 241 days	Phoenix Arena, Waterbury, Connecticut, U.S.	
33	Win	27–4–1 (1)	Bobby Hansen	TKO	7 (12)	Apr 24, 1920	21 years, 227 days	Phoenix Arena, Waterbury, Connecticut, U.S.	
32	Win	26–4–1 (1)	Harry Martin	TKO	1 (6)	Apr 23, 1920	21 years, 226 days	4th Regiment Armory, Jersey City, New Jersey, U.S.	
31	Win	25–4–1 (1)	Mike Dundee	KO	1 (?)	Apr 19, 1920	21 years, 222 days	White Plains, New York, U.S.	
30	Win	24–4–1 (1)	Joe Ryder	TKO	8 (12)	Apr 17, 1920	21 years, 220 days	Phoenix Arena, Waterbury, Connecticut, U.S.	
29	Win	23–4–1 (1)	Billy Fitzsimmons	KO	1 (?)	Mar 1, 1920	21 years, 173 days	Newark, New Jersey, U.S.	Precise date unknown at this time
28	Win	22–4–1 (1)	Al Ziemer	TKO	6 (6)	Feb 25, 1920	21 years, 168 days	Newark Athletic Club, Newark, New Jersey, U.S.	
27	Win	21–4–1 (1)	Pinky Brown	KO	4 (6)	Feb 14, 1920	21 years, 157 days	New York A.C., New York City, New York, U.S.	
26	Loss	20–4–1 (1)	Harvey Crosby	NWS	8	Jul 3, 1918	19 years, 296 days	Spring A.C., West Hoboken, New Jersey, U.S.	
25	Win	20–3–1 (1)	Harvey Crosby	NWS	6	Jul 2, 1918	19 years, 295 days	United States of America	
24	Win	19–3–1 (1)	Patsy Wallace	NWS	6	Apr 29, 1918	19 years, 231 days	Olympia A.C., Philadelphia, Pennsylvania, U.S.	
23	Win	18–3–1 (1)	Patsy Wallace	NWS	6	Apr 8, 1918	19 years, 210 days	Olympia A.C., Philadelphia, Pennsylvania, U.S.	
22	Win	17–3–1 (1)	Young Warren	KO	6 (?)	Sep 2, 1917	18 years, 357 days	New York City, New York, U.S.	Precise date unknown at this time
21	Win	16–3–1 (1)	Marshall Watier	KO	6 (?)	Sep 1, 1917	18 years, 356 days	New York City, New York, U.S.	Precise date unknown at this time
20	Draw	15–3–1 (1)	Terry Miller	NWS	10	Aug 31, 1917	18 years, 355 days	New Polo A.C., New York City, New York, U.S.	
19	Loss	15–3 (1)	Patsy Finnegan	KO	7 (?)	Jun 18, 1917	18 years, 281 days	Harlem S.C., New York City, New York, U.S.	
18	Win	15–2 (1)	Tommy Geary	NWS	10	May 26, 1917	18 years, 258 days	New York City, New York, U.S.	
17	Win	14–2 (1)	Kid Rash	NWS	10	Apr 25, 1917	18 years, 227 days	New York City, New York, U.S.	Precise date unknown at this time
16	Win	13–2 (1)	Jack Rath	NWS	6	Mar 27, 1917	18 years, 198 days	Hunts Point Palace, New York City, New York, U.S.	Precise date unknown at this time
15	ND	12–2 (1)	Johnny Monroe	ND	10	Mar 9, 1917	18 years, 180 days	Harlem S.C., New York City, New York, U.S.	
14	Win	12–2	Terry Miller	NWS	10	Feb 25, 1917	18 years, 168 days	New York City, New York, U.S.	Precise date unknown at this time
13	Win	11–2	Jack Sullivan	KO	2 (?)	Jan 29, 1917	18 years, 141 days	Olympic A.C., New York City, New York, U.S.	
12	Win	10–2	Joey Leonard	NWS	10	Jan 25, 1917	18 years, 137 days	New York City, New York, U.S.	Precise date unknown at this time
11	Win	9–2	Joe Greenfield	NWS	10	Dec 16, 1916	18 years, 97 days	New York City, New York, U.S.	
10	Win	8–2	Allie Kennedy	KO	2 (?)	Dec 8, 1916	18 years, 89 days	New York City, New York, U.S.	
9	Win	7–2	Kid Rago	KO	9 (?)	Dec 1, 1916	18 years, 82 days	New York City, New York, U.S.	Precise date unknown at this time
8	Win	6–2	Young Joe Dundee	KO	2 (?)	Nov 20, 1916	18 years, 71 days	New York City, New York, U.S.	
7	Win	5–2	Murray Perkle	NWS	10	Nov 13, 1916	18 years, 64 days	Olympic A.C., New York City, New York, U.S.	
6	Win	4–2	Tommy Fritz	KO	8 (?)	Oct 1, 1916	18 years, 21 days	New York City, New York, U.S.	Precise date unknown at this time
5	Loss	3–2	Tommy Geary	NWS	10	Sep 25, 1916	18 years, 15 days	Olympic A.C., New York City, New York, U.S.	
4	Win	3–1	Young Shindine	KO	6 (?)	Sep 1, 1916	17 years, 357 days	New York City, New York, U.S.	Precise date unknown at this time
3	Win	2–1	Smiling Willie	TKO	2 (10)	Aug 26, 1916	17 years, 351 days	Fairmont A.C., New York City, New York, U.S.	
2	Loss	1–1	Kid Rago	NWS	10	Aug 4, 1916	17 years, 329 days	New Polo A.C., New York City, New York, U.S.	
1	Win	1–0	Georgie Lewis	KO	8 (10)	Jun 30, 1916	17 years, 294 days	New Polo A.C., New York City, New York, U.S.	

== Titles in boxing ==
=== Major world titles ===
- NYSAC bantamweight champion (118 lbs)
- NBA (WBA) bantamweight champion (118 lbs)

=== The Ring magazine titles ===
- The Ring bantamweight champion (Note: Inaugural champion.) (118 lbs)

=== Undisputed titles ===
- Undisputed bantamweight champion

== See also ==
- List of bantamweight boxing champions
- List of select Jewish boxers

== Notes and references ==
=== References ===
Achievements
Preceded by Joe Lynch	World Bantamweight Champion; March 21, 1924 – December 19, 1924	Succeeded by Eddie Martin
