= Bushy Graham =

American boxer (1903–1982)

Personal information
- Nickname: The Bantam Phantom
- Nationality: American
- Born: Angelo Geraci; June 18, 1903 Calabria, Italy
- Died: August 5, 1982 (aged 77) Utica, New York
- Height: 5 ft 5 in (1.65 m)
- Weight: Bantamweight

Boxing career
- Reach: 5 ft 4 in (1.63 m)
- Stance: Orthodox

Boxing record
- Total fights: 137
- Wins: 110
- Win by KO: 39
- Losses: 19
- Draws: 8

Bushy Graham (18 June 1903 – 5 August 1982) was an American boxer from New York City. He took the Undisputed World Bantamweight Championship on May 23, 1928, when he defeated Corporal Izzy Schwartz at Ebbets Field in Brooklyn. Unwilling to defend the title at the bantamweight limit, he vacated it in January, 1929, and in the 1930s became a top rated World Featherweight contender.

He had a number of managers who included Peter Carro, Bill Parr, Dewey Fragetta, Joe Netro, and Joe Falcone.

== Early life and career highlights ==
Angelo Gerraci was born on June 8, 1905, in Calabria, Italy. He took the ringname Graham from a Canadian boxer he admired, and possibly to honor the many accomplished Irish boxers of his era who were popular in New York. He adopted the nickname "Bushy" from the look of his thick, dark, wavy hair. In New York, particularly in his early career, Graham frequently boxed under the name Micky Garcia, or in rare cases Bobby Garcia. Graham had a brother who boxed under the name of "Frankie Garcia" and "Frankie Graham".

Bushy Graham became a professional boxer in 1921, and initially boxed exclusively near his hometown of Utica, or in the state of New York.

On March 28, 1924, Graham defeated Frankie Ash in a six-round points decision in Syracuse, New York.

=== Bouts with Flyweight Champion Frankie Genaro ===
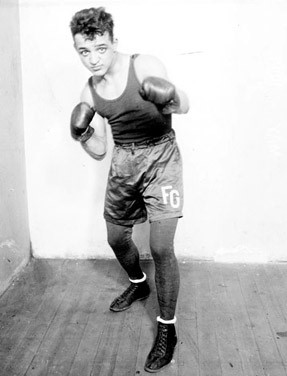
Flyweight Frankie Genaro

Graham fought American and future NBA World Flyweight Champion Frankie Genaro On July 7, 1924, in Rochester, New York, to a draw. In a spirited rematch on September 23, Genaro defeated Graham by a twelve-round decision in Brooklyn. Genaro took seven rounds, and scored knockdowns in the fourth, eighth, and twelfth, pulling ahead most decisively in the last three rounds. He was the aggressor with fast left jabs and right crosses, and mixed frequently with Graham throughout the bout.

==== Win over Genaro, May, 1926 ====
On May 17, 1926, he met Genaro for a third time at New York's Madison Square Garden in the first of three feature bouts and defeated him in a speedy ten round points decision. Before a capacity crowd of 18,000, Graham used his longer reach, and slight extra weight to advantage against New York's former American flyweight champion. Winning handily, Graham side stepped and smartly countered with his left, which he held extended as Genaro came at him repeatedly. Both boxers left the ring showing signs of battle on their faces.

On September 8, 1924, fighting as Mickey Garcia in a ten-round semi-final, he defeated Jackie Snyder in a disqualification, 1:35 into the eighth round at Queensboro Athletic Club in Queens, New York. The referee ended the bout when Graham received a low blow and was unable to continue.

He defeated Jewish boxer Nat Pincus in a technical knockout, 1:03 into the eighth round on January 9, 1925, at New York's Madison Square Garden. In what the Brooklyn Daily Eagle termed a "brilliant exhibition", Graham knocked Pincus to the mat once in the first, twice in the fourth, and once in the eighth. Dancing with his hands by his side as was his style, Graham brought up either fist at the slightest opening. He dropped Pincus in the first with a right hand smash to the chin. A solid left hook brought Pincus to the mat again for a count of nine in the fourth. Pincus gamely fought on, taking further punishment, but connecting with blows that slowed Graham a bit until the final round. The brutal match may have contributed to the boxing retirement of Pincus, who fought few additional bouts after his crushing loss.

On June 24, 1925, Graham won a ten-round newspaper decision against Pete Zivic in Utica, New York. Zivic was down in the seventh and was quite weak by the end of the match.

=== Victory over Abe Goldstein, July 1925 ===
On July 23, 1925, Graham defeated Abe Goldstein, a 1923 NYSAC World Bantamweight Champion, in an exciting eight round points decision at the Velodrome in New York City. Graham, who fought under the name Mickey Garcia, sent Goldstein to the mat in the first and fourth rounds. Graham's decisive win came in a semi-final match prior to Charlie "Phil" Rosenberg's main bout, and served to spotlight Graham as a future challenger to Rosenberg's world bantamweight title. Graham had previously defeated Tommy Ryan in an eight-round points decision on New Years Day, 1925, in Syracuse. Ryan had contended unsuccessfully against Goldstein for the NYSAC Bantamweight Championship in September, 1924.

=== Bouts with Bantamweight Champion, Bud Taylor, 1925 ===
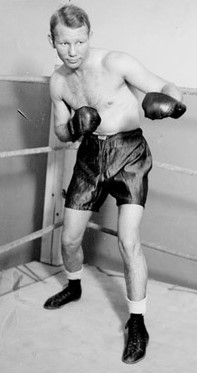
Bud Taylor

On July 31, 1925, he met 1927–1928 NBA World Bantamweight Champion Bud Taylor in Aurora, Illinois. Though, outweighing Taylor by six pounds, Graham lost in a ten-round newspaper decision of the New York Times. Graham was down for a count of nine in the first round from a left uppercut from Taylor, and upon arising was down again for a count of seven, but he soldiered on. In the ninth, Taylor was down for a no-count from a right by Graham. In a close bout, The Chicago Tribune gave four rounds to Taylor, two for Graham, and scored four even.

He won the second meeting with Taylor on August 24, 1925, in Queens, New York, in a close twelve round points decision. Both boxers gave blows equally, but Graham appeared to gain the edge in several rounds due to his speed and inflicted more damage to Taylor in the majority of rounds. The fight was considered quite close throughout.

August 5, 1926, at New York's Madison Square Garden, Graham scored a technical knockout over Dominick Petrone due to a dislocated right shoulder he complained of :45 seconds into the eighth round. The referee stopped the bout when Petrone requested an end to the match due to his injury.

On September 2, 1926, he defeated top rated bantamweight Chick Suggs in a ten-round points decision at Madison Square Garden. Graham dominated in the final two rounds, battering Sugts in a bout that clearly placed Graham at the top of world bantamweight title contenders. Graham danced through the ten rounds, showing his best technique against his undefeated opponent, and nearly gaining a knockout in the ninth, though Suggs fought on and remained on his feet throughout the bout.

Breaking a long winning streak, on December 17, 1926, he fought future triple weight class world champion Tony Canzoneri at Madison Square Garden in a non-title match and lost by a ten-round points decision. Though he would become Graham's most accomplished opponent, Canzoneri's victory over Graham was considered an upset at the time, as he had been boxing only two years. Canzoneri won the first round and then forced the fighting throughout the match. Graham, by comparison, seemed passive, and moved about the ring without summoning any power in his offensive, perhaps wary of the skill of his opponent.

== Attempt at NYSAC World Bantamweight Title, 1927 ==
On February 4, 1927, Graham first gained the opportunity to fight for the New York State Athletic Commission (NYSAC) World Bantamweight Title held by Charley Phil Rosenberg. Rosenberg defeated him in a fifteen-round unanimous decision at New York's Madison Square Garden. Rosenberg weighed in at 122.5 lbs., four pounds over the limit for the title match. Regardless of Rosenberg's inability to make weight, Graham would have taken the world bantamweight title had he won the match. His speed carried him into a slight edge in the first four rounds, but Rosenberg discovered the key to Graham's defense in the remaining rounds, and dominated him with solid blows. Though unable to knock his opponent to the mat during the match, Rosenberg unleashed a barrage of punches from the second round until the close. After the second, Graham suffered frequently from Rosenberg's lefts to the head.

== NBA and NYSAC World Bantamweight Champ, 1928 ==
He received another shot at the vacant NYSAC and National Boxing Association titles when he met Corporal Izzy Schwartz. Graham defeated Schwartz in a fifteen-round unanimous decision on May 23, 1928, at Ebbets Field in Brooklyn. A strong aggressor in the thirteenth, Graham dropped Schwartz for a nine count in the fourteenth. The fighting was fierce in the fifteenth, and Schwartz received additional punishment including a terrific right cross as the bell rang, though Schwartz remained on his feet til the final bell. Graham was awarded twelve rounds, Schwartz, the seventh and eighth, with the sixth even. The early rounds were closer than the final three, with Schwartz mounting an excellent defense. Neil Edward, of the Democrat and Chronicle, wrote that the bout was close through the first ten rounds. The fight was controversial and unpopular as Graham outweighed his flyweight opponent by at least seven pounds, an unusually wide span for a title bout. He did not defend the NYSAC bantamweight title, vacating it in January 1929.

He knocked out Babe Keller in the second round of a scheduled ten round feature bout at the Music Hall Arena in Cincinnati on February 13, 1929. Kellar showed the desire to mix in the first round, which could have been ruled as close by some ringsiders. The tide turned early in the second round when Graham downed Keller with a right to the chin for a count of nine. Not long after arising, Graham tagged his opponent out with a left and then a right that put Keller down for the count.

He lost to Kid Chocolate on April 12, 1929, by a seventh round disqualification in an eventful bout before a packed house of 16,000 at the Coliseum in the Bronx. Both boxers were near the bantamweight limit. Graham boxed, feinted, and danced through the bout, but dealt a low blow to the "Kid" in the second that put him on the mat, and brought a warning from the referee. The "Kid" was fouled again at the end of the round, and Graham was again warned for fouls in the third and sixth. The "Kid" dropped Graham briefly in the second, but Graham dominated through the fifth. In the seventh, the "Kid" found his range and appeared to be on the verge of a knockout after he rocked Graham with a right on the chin. After managing to stay on his feet, Graham hit a long left hook below the belt of Chocolate, which caused the referee to end the bout 2:04 into the seventh. Ringside reporters gave Graham four of the first six, while Chocolate won the second and fourth. Both boxers were briefly on the mat twice for a no count, with Chocolate down from a right in the first, and a low left in the second, and Graham down in the second and seventh. The bout was originally scheduled to be for the World Bantamweight Title, but the outcome ended the plan.

He was later stripped of his NBA title on October 8, 1929, after which the NBA installed Panama Al Brown as champion.

== Post title career highlights ==
By 1930, Graham was usually fighting as a featherweight, and meeting quality contenders as opponents.

He held champion Freddie Miller to a draw before a crowd of 6,000 on January 29, 1930, in Cincinnati. Graham had quite a late start, fighting on the defensive and losing on points until the last round, when in desperation he became the aggressor and knocked Miller to the canvas for a nine count with a left to the temple. He continued to dominate in the tenth with two brief knock downs, until turning the tide on points and forcing the judges to rule a draw. The crowd, who were rooting for Miller, their native Cincinnati featherweight, vocally protested the ruling as Miller had led for nine rounds.

On May 15, 1929, Graham defeated Jewish boxer Young Montreal in Providence in a ten-round split decision.

On June 11, 1929, Graham had an important victory over Jewish boxer Archie Bell before a crowd of 4,000 in a ten-round decision at Artillery Park in Wilkes-Barre, Pennsylvania. One reporter gave Graham six rounds, three for Bell, and the eighth even. Bell was dominant in the fifth, sixth and seventh, though he was down for a count of eight in the first round from a sweeping right by Graham. Bell was down again in the third for a count of nine from a low right from Graham which failed to get a warning from the referee. In the fourth, another low punch from Graham seemed to tire Bell. Graham punished Bell in the eighth, and built a significant margin on points in the last two rounds. Within two months of the win and according to one source, shortly before it, Graham was recognized as the World Bantamweight Champion by the Pennsylvania Athletic Commission, though this was not a universal recognition.

On August 26, 1929, Graham defeated Vidal Gregorio in a non-title match before a crowd of 7,500 in a ten-round points decision at the Arena in Philadelphia. Graham danced, feinted effectively with a bobbing head, and dodged the left leads of Gregorio at will. With arms dangling to the side, as was his custom, Graham delivered whistling rights to the chin and face of his opponent using speed rather than any advantage in reach to make his mark. In a decisive victory, Graham was awarded eight of the ten rounds, and though he twice went to the floor for no counts, only once in the seventh was it from a glancing blow.

On September 20, 1929, in the feature bout at Boston Garden, Graham lost to Andy Martin in a non-title ten round points decision. Martin carried six rounds, Graham three, and one was even. Graham tried for a knockout in the seventh, eighth and ninth, but Martin weathered the storm, though losing the rounds on points. In the first six rounds, Martin seemed to clearly dominate, giving Graham an "artistic lacing".

On May 28, 1930, Graham lost a ten-round points decision fought before a disappointing crowd of 5000, to former American and World Flyweight Champion Fidel LaBarba at New York's Madison Square Garden. The New York Times despaired of the contest, writing that "Hardly more than one round of good solid fighting was crowded into the time occupied by the ten sessions". Graham refused to mix with LaBarba, causing the bout to proceed slowly, and spark gentle protests from the small crowd present. LaBarba's desire to engage with his unwilling opponent forced him to chase Graham around the ring. Graham often held during the few instances when LaBarba did mix with him. Graham showed his usual speed and evasive in the first five rounds, but landed few blows of his own. By the sixth through tenth rounds, LaBarba began to score with strong left hooks and turned the tide of the fight. Having little luck with the ex-champion, Graham had lost to LaBarba two years earlier at Olympic Auditorium in Los Angeles.

=== Boxing from 1930-31 ===
Graham decisively defeated Milton Cohen on July 15, 1930, knocking him out 1:30 into the third round at Utica Stadium, his favored hometown venue. Cohen was down for counts of nine and two in the second round. In the third, Cohen was down for a nine count shortly before he rose to the blows that put him to the mat for the last time.

On April 22, 1931, Graham outpointed prolific Cleveland-based Filipino boxer Tony Datto in a six-round bout in Cleveland, Ohio. Datto had held the Pacific Coast Lightweight Title in June 1924, and the Featherweight Championship of Ohio in July 1930.

On May 11, 1931, Graham defeated Hymie Wiseman in an eight-round newspaper decision of the Des Moines Register and Tribune at the Coliseum in Des Moines, Iowa.

=== Bouts with Featherweight Champ Battling Battalino, 1931 ===
Graham lost to Battalino in Hartford on April 25, 1930, in a hotly contested battle, where Battalino was credited with eight of the ten rounds. The reigning featherweight champion dominated Graham throughout the match. Unexpectedly in the fourth, Graham floored Battalino with a left to the chin for a count of nine, but the champion continued on through the following rounds seemingly unfazed. In their final bout, Battalino knocked out Graham 1:44 into the first round with a right cross to the chin on November 19, 1931, in Chicago, Illinois. The bout was a preliminary to a heavyweight match and brought an impressive 17,393 to Chicago Stadium. If his first meeting with Battalino had been a title match, Graham might have taken the World Featherweight Championship.

Before a mid-sized crowd of 3,500, he defeated Battalino, still NBA World Featherweight Champion, in Cincinnati's Redland Field in a ten-round non-title match on September 24, 1931. The crowd found the bout dull, as few solid punches were landed, and a great deal of clinching occurred until the last three rounds when the boxers clashed more frequently. At long range, Graham seemed to have the advantage in the later rounds. Though Battalino could only connect to the body, he appeared to be the aggressor throughout the first seven rounds and may have had the advantage during in-fighting. Several reporters gave Graham five in the close match, with Battalino four, and the first round even. Graham took the second, fourth, sixth, eighth, and ninth.

=== NBA Featherweight Tournament loss, 1932 ===
On April 8, 1932, Graham lost in a minor upset to Tommy Paul in a ten-round points decision at Olympia Stadium in Detroit, Michigan. The opponents fought evenly for the first six rounds, but Paul pulled ahead in the seventh, planting a strong right on the cheek of Graham that opened an old cut. He then insured his winning points margin by taking two of the last three rounds, battering Graham particularly hard in the ninth and opening a cut below the eye. The bout, which drew only a small crowd of 2,645, was the first of an elimination tournament sanctioned by the National Boxing Association to pick the new NBA World Featherweight Champion to succeed Bat Battalino, who had vacated the title. Graham, who was warned three times by the referee for avoiding and not actively engaging his opponent, danced and used his fancy footwork throughout the bout, but was booed my many for throwing far too few punches at Paul. After 1932, Graham returned to boxing almost exclusively near his hometown of Utica or in the New York area.

On November 6, 1935, Graham defeated Eddie Zivic in an eight-round points decision at Convention Hall in Utica. There were no knockdowns, but Graham won decisively despite receiving a cut in the corner of his right eye in the second round.

=== Bout with Featherweight Champ Leo Rodak, 1936 ===
On February 7, 1936, Graham fought Leo Rodak, a 1938 world featherweight champion, to a draw in Madison Square Garden. Graham used smart foot work, lightning fast ducking, and superb slipping and counter-punching. Graham frequently leaned forward coaxing Rodak to throw punches, and then repeatedly drew back and dodged them. Showing his command, he stung Rodak's face with jabs and overhand swings. In the seventh, Rodak was dropped by a blow from Graham who had remained illusive despite Rodak's attacks. Despite fighting far less frequently and the advanced age of 32, Graham gave an excellent display of talent to the younger Golden Gloves winner. Though the final ruling was a draw, Graham demonstrated he still had championship form.

On April 17, 1936, Graham won on a second-round technical knockout over Mexican American boxer Tony Herrera at the Arena in Syracuse, New York. The bout was stopped by the referee after Herrera received a cut on his forehead. Graham's wrist was sprained in the bout as well.

Before a substantial late career crowd of 2,300, on June 15, 1936, Graham defeated Johnny Jadick, former Junior Welterweight Champion, in an eight-round points decision in Utica, New York. Jadick was down on the mat in the first, second, and sixth from the blows of Graham, and both once took a tumble into the press box.

=== Loss to Lightweight Champion, Enrico Venturi, 1936 ===
On November 27, 1936, Graham, fighting as a lightweight, lost to Italian Enrico Venturi, former holder of the European Lightweight Title, in a close eight round points decision at New York's Madison Square Garden. Shifting rapidly on defense and dancing to deliver pinpoint blows, Graham led in the early rounds, but tired as the bout continued. The match was a preliminary to the Ross-Jannazzo World Welterweight Title and brought in 8,500 fans.

== Titles in boxing ==
=== Major world titles ===
- NYSAC bantamweight champion (118 lbs)
- NBA (WBA) bantamweight champion (118 lbs)

=== Regional/International titles ===
- Pennsylvania State bantamweight champion (118 lbs)

=== Undisputed titles ===
- Undisputed bantamweight champion

== Life outside boxing ==
Graham retired from boxing in 1937 after a second-round knockout of Willie Hines in Utica, New York. He had many benevolent activities in his life. He performed in charity exhibitions with brother Frankie and other boxers, and promoted regional athletic clubs. He contributed to orphanages and other causes, and in his retirement from the ring managed several aspiring boxers.

He died at the age of 72 on August 5, 1982, in his hometown of Utica, New York.

Sporting positions
Major world boxing titles
Vacant Title last held by Charlie Phil Rosenberg	NYSAC bantamweight champion May 23, 1928 – January 1929; Vacated	Succeeded by Panama Al Brown
Vacant Title last held by Bud Taylor	NBA bantamweight champion May 23, 1928 – October 8, 1929; Stripped	Succeeded by Panama Al Brown
