= USS Commodore (IX-7) =

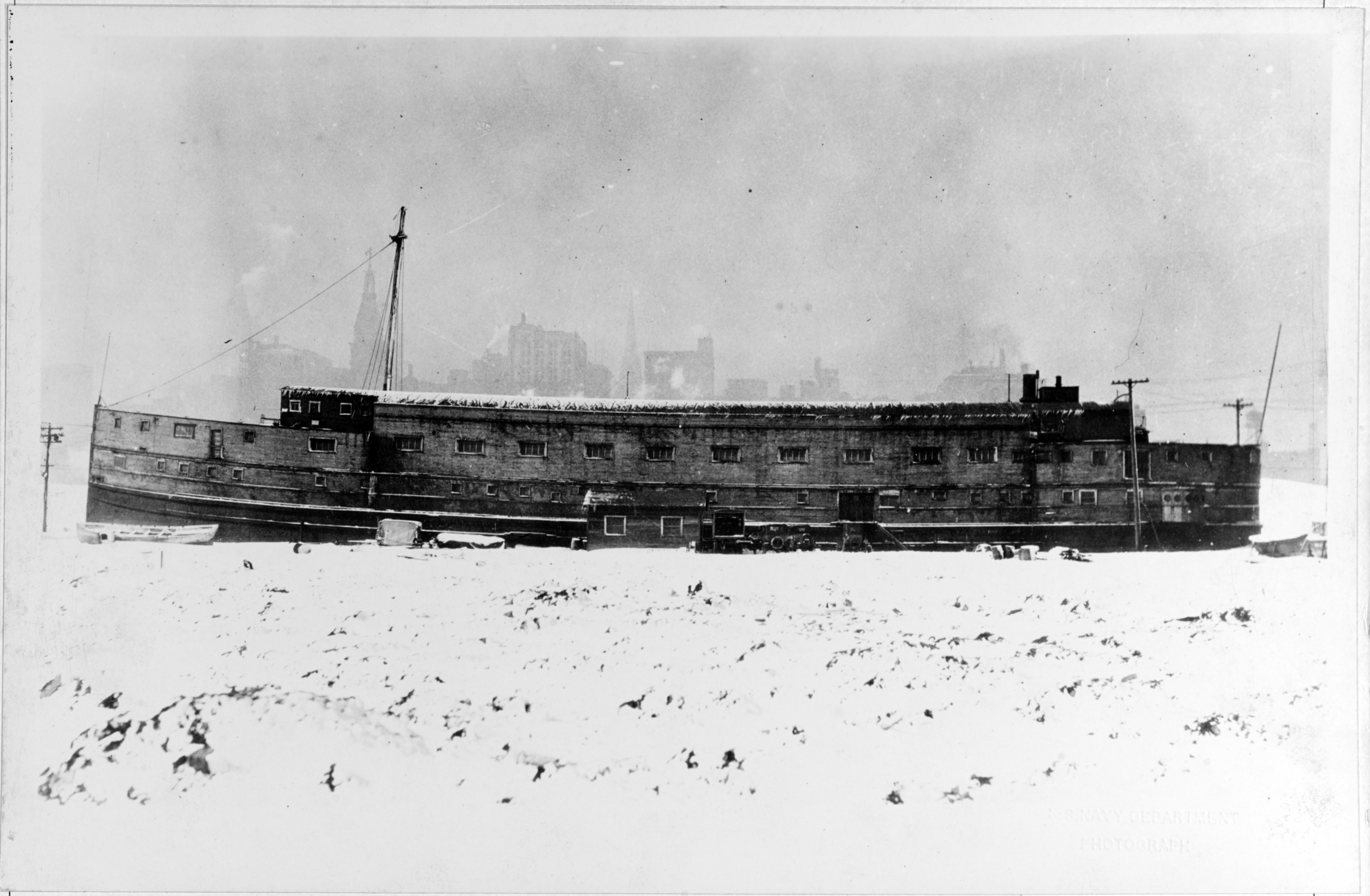
- At Chicago

History

United States
- Laid down: 1875
- Acquired: 1 September 1918
- Decommissioned: 10 March 1930
- Fate: Dismantled and demolished January 1931

General characteristics
- Displacement: 2200 tons
- Length: 265 ft 5 in (80.90 m)
- Beam: 42 ft 2 in (12.85 m)
- Draught: 15 ft 5 in (4.70 m)
- Armament: one four-inch gun

USS Commodore (IX-7), an unclassified miscellaneous vessel, was the third ship of the United States Navy to be named for that naval rank. She was built in 1875 at Cleveland, Ohio, purchased by the United States Navy at Chicago, Illinois, on 1 September 1918, and stationed at Chicago.

Until 30 April 1919 she served as a receiving ship and thereafter as a Naval Reserve Armory. No longer required for this duty following completion of the new Chicago Naval Reserve Armory in 1930, Commodore was decommissioned on 10 March 1930. Her hulk was dismantled and demolished by Naval Reservists by January 1931.
