= Carl Tremaine =

Canadian boxer (1901–1989)

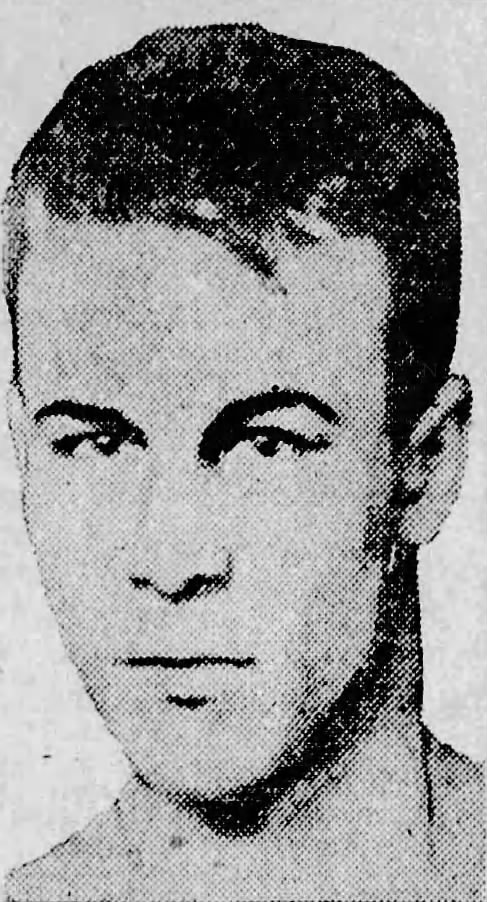

Personal information
- Nationality: (Canada) Canadian
- Born: Carmelo Cantalupo; November 11, 1901 Palermo, Sicily
- Died: March 17, 1989 (aged 87)
- Occupation: Boxer
- Height: 5 ft 3 in (160 cm)
- Weight: Bantamweight

Boxing career
- Reach: 65 in (165 cm)

Boxing record
- Total fights: 65
- Wins: 46
- Win by KO: 20
- Losses: 13
- Draws: 6

Carl Tremaine (born Carmelo Cantalupo; November 11, 1901 – March 17, 1989) was an Italian-born Canadian professional bantamweight boxer.

== Early life ==
Carmelo Cantalupo was born in Palermo, Sicily, on November 11, 1901. He grew up in Listowel, Ontario.

He was raised in a family with eight children, six boys and two girls. Carl began boxing at a young age, following in the footsteps of his older brothers, who were all fighters.

== Amateur boxing career ==
Starting as an amateur boxer, Tremaine claimed the 108-pound championship of Michigan in his first year while living in the state. He fought as an amateur until 17, amassing a 40-1 record.

== Professional boxing career ==
He went to Detroit and turned pro in 1918, using the ring name Carl Tremaine.

After making Cleveland his headquarters in 1919, he came under the guidance of trainer and manager Jimmy Dunn, who had developed Johnny Kilbane into a world titleholder. He drew comparisons to Stanley Ketchel and Terry McGovern, with his fighting style resembling a mix of both fighters.

He gained national recognition in April 1920 when he knocked out Frankie Mason in the first round of their fourth encounter in Toledo, Ohio.

Between May and December 1920, Tremaine posted two victories over Memphis Pal Moore in their first two bouts and kicked off a fight series with Joe Burman, winning one and dropping one. He lost in a rubber match against Burman on January 19, 1921. He returned to the win column five days later with a victory over former bantamweight champion Kid Williams in Philadelphia on January 24, 1921. He positioned himself as a challenger for Joe Lynch's world bantamweight title, but a title fight failed to materialize despite his call-out.

Tremaine fought Memphis Pal Moore again in back-to-back fights in February 1921, dividing the series with a win and a loss as their rivalry continued.

=== Taking the Canadian featherweight championship, May 1921 ===
On May 10, 1921, he became the featherweight champion of Canada after a TKO win over Eddie Gallagher at the Hamilton Arena. The title fight was stopped in the fourth round by referee Sergeant Major Blake following several knockdowns. By May 27, 1921, he had either been stripped of the title or had vacated it.

Following a win over Roy Moore, he fought to a 12-round draw with Jack "Kid" Wolfe at Dunn Field in Cleveland on July 11, 1921.

In January 1922, he took on Memphis Pal Moore in Memphis, Tennessee, in the fifth and final installment of their series. He was outpointed by Moore over eight rounds.

He defeated future Jr. Lightweight Champion Mike Ballerino with a second-round technical knockout at Madison Square Garden on January 19, 1923. After a first-round knockdown and two more in the second, Tremaine forced a stoppage by referee Andy Griffin at 1 minute 45 seconds.

In February 1923, he scored a sixth-round knockout victory over "Irish" Johnny Curtin in their rematch. Curtin was then a leading contender for a world title fight.

He went on to outpoint Johnny Ertle in their March 1923 bout in Windsor, Ontario, and then he fought Ertle again at Columbus's Fairmount Arena in May 1923, winning the 12-round rematch. On July 7, 1923, he scored a seventh-round knockout over Peter Zivic in Pittsburgh. The Cleveland-based bantamweight battled Young Montreal to a 12-round draw in their rematch on November 9, 1923.

Tremaine faced American flyweight champion Frankie Genaro on November 29, 1923. Fighting before a crowd of about 8,000 at Madison Square Garden, he lost by split decision after 10 rounds. Post-fight analysis indicated that Tremaine had secured seven rounds compared to four for Genaro.

He faced Canadian bantamweight champion Bobby Eber at the Barton Street Arena in Hamilton, Ontario, in June 1924. He lost to Eber by disqualification in the fifth round. It drew a record attendance for boxing in Hamilton at the time. Following the loss to Eber, he scored a TKO victory over Jack "Kid" Wolfe in the first round of a 10-round rematch at Cleveland's Olympic Arena on July 28, 1924. The Ring magazine listed him fourth in their inaugural annual ratings for the bantamweight division in 1924.

He outpointed world bantamweight champion Eddie Martin on February 24, 1925, facing a titleholder who held a 63-2-2 record. The world championship was not on the line, as both Tremaine and Martin came in at 121¼ pounds, exceeding the 118-pound bantamweight limit. The event set a Cleveland record for indoor boxing attendance.

In October 1925, he fought Benny Gershe, who entered the ring with 13 wins and one loss. He stopped Gershe with a knockout in the tenth and final round.

In the February 1926 issue of The Ring, he was ranked eighth among the bantamweights of 1925.

He defeated former Canadian champion Howard Mayberry by technical knockout on February 16, 1927. The bout ended when Mayberry sustained a fractured lower jaw and could not continue.

He fought for the last time in March 1929. He suffered a first-round knockout loss in a rematch with Eddie Shea in Indianapolis.

== Professional boxing record ==
65 fights	46 wins	13 losses
By knockout	20	3
By decision	26	10
Draws	6	

== Life after boxing ==
In 1934, he was working as a boxing manager, and one of his protégés was Joe Boldin.

He eventually changed his name to Carl Kent, moved back to New York City, and paid for admission into the electrician's union.

== Death ==
Carl Tremaine died on March 17, 1989, at the age of 87.

== Legacy ==
- 1976 Greater Cleveland Sports Hall of Fame inductee

Achievements
Preceded by Eddie Gallagher	Canadian Featherweight Champion; May 10, 1921 – Vacated	Succeeded by Vacant
