= Eddie Martin (boxer) =

American boxer

Personal information
- Nickname: "Cannonball" Eddie Martin
- Nationality: American
- Born: Eduardo Vittoria Martino; February 26, 1903 Brooklyn, New York
- Died: August 27, 1966 (aged 63) Brooklyn, New York
- Height: 5 ft 3 in (1.60 m)
- Weight: Bantamweight

Boxing career
- Reach: 65 in (165 cm)
- Stance: Orthodox

Boxing record
- Total fights: 101
- Wins: 82
- Win by KO: 29
- Losses: 14
- Draws: 4
- No contests: 1

"Cannonball" Eddie Martin (1903-1966) became the Undisputed World Bantamweight Champion on December 19, 1924, in a close fifteen round split decision against Abe Goldstein at New York's Madison Square Garden.

He held the title only three months, losing decisively to Jewish boxer Charlie "Phil" Rosenberg in a fifteen round unanimous decision on March 20, 1925, in Madison Square Garden. Martin fought many boxers who at one time held titles, including Featherweight and Jr. Lightweight World Champion Johnny Dundee, Super Featherweight World Champion Tod Morgan, and World Lightweight Champion Al Singer. He also met the lesser known boxers, Johnny Curtin, Willie O'Connell, Johnny Vestri, and Wilbur Cohen.

== Early life and career ==
Hoping originally to play baseball as a short stop in the Major Leagues, Martin quit high school before graduation to pursue a professional career in the ring, against the wishes of his father. His father, who had been a successful caterer, had white collar ambitions for his son. Eddie was the sixth of nine sons and five daughters of father Giustino Martino, who managed his large Italian family with his wife in Brooklyn, New York. Several of his older siblings died before he became bantamweight champion. One of his earliest mentors was boxer Mike Doherty, who recognized his early talent as an amateur and managed him throughout his career. His other manager was Mel Cooke.

He began fighting in the Brooklyn area in December 1921, winning thirteen of his first fourteen fights, with an impressive five by knockout or technical knockout.

Between November 3, 1922, and November 6, 1924, Martin had an astonishing winning streak of 48 victories and only one draw, winning seventeen by knockout or technical knockout. He fought in this two year period almost exclusively in the Brooklyn and wider New York area, with four bouts at Madison Square Garden.

== World Bantamweight champion ==
On December 19, 1924, Martin won the World Bantamweight Title against Abe Goldstein in a split decision in fifteen rounds before an impressive crowd of around 13,000 at New York's Madison Square Garden. Showing boxing dominance at an early age, Martin had only recently turned twenty-one. He had not been allowed to box in fifteen rounders by the New York State Boxing Commission until reaching that age. Some newspapers wrote that the close bout should have gone to Goldstein and that the match was marred by too much clinching for which Goldstein was cautioned at one point. Though both boxers, particularly Martin, showed aggressiveness in the bout, one newspaper noted "Goldstein weakened toward the end, and it was only by dint of holding that he saved himself from the Cannonballs's rushes." Though "in round twelve Abe's right reached Martin's jaw half a dozen times", Martin seemed to last through Goldstein's best shots. One source characterized the referee's ruling in the bout as a "razor thin decision."

The Lincoln Star wrote that Goldstein had an advantage in the first six rounds, particularly the third, but that Martin showed aggression and put Goldstein on the defensive so often that he eventually won the decision. Goldstein's trainer Ray Arcel believed that his fighter's dominance in the first six rounds, particularly the third when he knocked down Martin, should have been enough for a decision, but he admitted that the fight was close.

The Ashbury Park Press, agreeing that Martin was the victor, noted that Goldstein seemed to be frequently on the defensive and clinched repeatedly as a reaction to Martin's attack. The Press observed that "although the former champion (Goldstein) was not seriously hurt by the fighting, he was unable to return it in any measure and constantly looped his fingers about his opponent's arms to save himself punishment. The Press also noted that "round after round saw him (Martin) forcing the fighting giving double for what he received." In short, "Goldstein lost his belt by taking the defensive and acquiescing to the infighting methods that Martin employed."

== Loss of Bantamweight Title ==
Phil Rosenberg, who would defeat Martin for the World Bantamweight Title, had boxed him previously. Rosenberg and Martin met three times, twice in six round decisions and once in a draw. On November 29, 1923, and January 28, 1924, Martin had defeated Rosenberg, in close decisions on points, both times in New York's Madison Square Garden. In their third meeting, a fast and furious affair on April 29, 1924, Rosenberg had given Martin a closer battle which ended in a ten round draw.

Eddie Martin finally lost the World Bantamweight Title to Jewish boxer Charlie "Phil" Rosenberg in a fifteen round unanimous decision on March 20, 1925, in Madison Square Garden. In the sweeping victory, the Lincoln Evening Journal wrote "Rosenberg had a clean margin in eleven of the fifteen rounds, and three were even." Martin appeared to have held a slight lead only in the early rounds. The Palm Beach Post noted that Rosenberg won using a "tantalizing left jab and a right uppercut, outboxing Martin at every turn and at the latter part of the match, holding his own in a furious toe-to-toe skirmish."

== World Jr. Lightweight Title shot ==
On January 23, 1928, boxing at 126 3/4 pounds, he defeated Dominick Petrone, a New York featherweight, in a ten round decision at the Broadway Arena.

On May 24, 1928, Martin met Tod Morgan in a World Junior Lightweight Title bout, losing and taking serious punishment. A crowd of only 6000 "apathetically" watched the title bout at Madison Square Garden. Despite the punishment taken by Martin, the bout was close as the Associated Press gave Morgan seven rounds, Martin six and two were even. The Alton Evening Telegraph wrote that "Morgan saved his crown by a brilliant rally in the fifteenth that had Martin groggy as the final bell ended the milling."

In a rematch on July 18, 1928, in another brutal and close fifteen rounds at Ebbets Field in Brooklyn, which drew a larger audience of 20,000, "Morgan came through a storm of punishment...to save the crown in a fifteen round engagement." The bout had been postponed repeatedly due to inclement weather. The Associated Press had Morgan winning only eight of the fifteen rounds, with Martin taking four and three even, though the fighting was considered close throughout the match. Typical of Martin's aggressive style of boxing, he pushed for a knockout in the thirteenth and mounted a "lunging, driving attack" against Morgan.

== Late boxing career ==
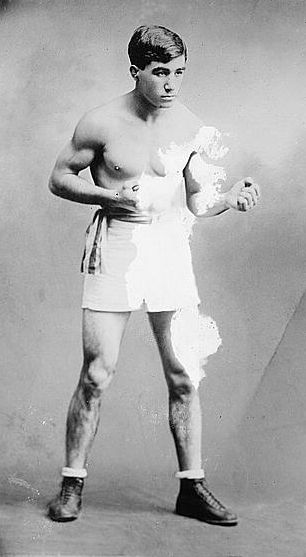
Johnny Dundee

On July 8, 1929, he lost to Johnny Dundee in a close ten round decision. Dundee had been a former Featherweight and Jr. Lightweight Champion. Though Martin was only 21 years old, he was nearing the end of his more competitive boxing career and losing with greater frequency. Dundee, who was thirty-six at the time of the bout, was knocked to the canvas in the first round by Martin's hard right to the jaw, but later prevailed in the bout due to a display of more skilled scientific boxing. In his prime, Dundee had probably been the better boxer. In a declining boxing career, Martin lost four of his last eight fights after his loss to boxing great Dundee.

On August 28, 1931, Martin fought lightweight champion Al Singer at Coney Island Stadium losing quickly in a second round technical knockout before a substantial but not enormous crowd of four thousand. As the bout was certainly not a title fight, and Martin was a bit past his prime, the attendance was not exceptional. Referee Jed Gahan stopped the bout to prevent Martin from suffering any further punishment. Martin, at the end of his career, had probably been somewhat mismatched with younger Al Singer, who had taken the World Lightweight Title on July 17, 1930. The knockout occurred in 1:31 of the second round.

== Life outside boxing ==
Eddie Martin retired from boxing around 1932. He had a wife Emmy, and a son Martin, Jr.

He died on August 27, 1966, at his home in Brooklyn, New York, though some sources erroneously give his year of death as 1968. He had been suffering from a heart condition. He was buried at Fort Hamilton Parkway in Brooklyn.

== Professional boxing record ==
All information in this section is derived from BoxRec, unless otherwise stated.

=== Official record ===
101 fights	81 wins	12 losses
By knockout	29	3
By decision	51	9
By disqualification	1	0
Draws	4	
No contests	1	
Newspaper decisions/draws	3	

All newspaper decisions are officially regarded as “no decision” bouts and are not counted in the win/loss/draw column.

No.	Result	Record	Opponent	Type	Round, time	Date	Location	Notes
101	Loss	81–12–4 (4)	Al Dunbar	PTS	10	May 19, 1932	Fort Hamilton Arena, New York City, New York, US	
100	Win	81–11–4 (4)	Harry Baron	PTS	6	Feb 19, 1932	Stauch's Arena, New York City, New York, US	
99	Loss	80–11–4 (4)	Al Singer	TKO	2 (10), 1:31	Aug 28, 1931	Coney Island Stadium, New York City, New York, US	
98	Draw	80–10–4 (4)	Joey Kaufman	PTS	6	May 1, 1931	Stauch's Arena, New York City, New York, US	
97	Win	80–10–3 (4)	Jackie Cohen	PTS	10	Mar 23, 1931	Prospect Hall, New York City, New York, US	
96	Loss	79–10–3 (4)	Marty Goldman	KO	9 (10)	Aug 11, 1930	Dexter Park Arena, New York City, New York, US	
95	Win	79–9–3 (4)	Jack Giraldo	KO	2 (4)	Jul 26, 1930	Ridgewood Grove, New York City, New York, US	
94	Loss	78–9–3 (4)	Young Zazzarino	KO	7 (10)	Sep 4, 1929	Bayonne, Louisiana, US	
93	Loss	78–8–3 (4)	Johnny Dundee	PTS	10	Jul 8, 1929	Dexter Park Arena, New York City, New York, US	
92	Loss	78–7–3 (4)	Davey Abad	NWS	10	May 3, 1929	Coliseum, Saint Louis, Missouri, US	
91	Draw	78–7–3 (3)	Al 'Rube' Goldberg	PTS	6	Mar 23, 1929	Ridgewood Grove, New York City, New York, US	
90	Win	78–7–2 (3)	Joe Barbara	PTS	6	Mar 9, 1929	Ridgewood Grove, New York City, New York, US	
89	Win	77–7–2 (3)	George Nickfor	PTS	6	Feb 23, 1929	Ridgewood Grove, New York City, New York, US	
88	Win	76–7–2 (3)	Herman Wallace	TKO	3 (?)	Dec 29, 1928	Ridgewood Grove, New York City, New York, US	
87	Win	75–7–2 (3)	Jackie Cohen	PTS	6	Nov 24, 1928	Ridgewood Grove, New York City, New York, US	
86	Loss	74–7–2 (3)	Tod Morgan	PTS	15	Jul 18, 1928	Ebbets Field, New York City, New York, US	For NYSAC, NBA, and The Ring junior lightweight titles
85	Loss	74–6–2 (3)	Tod Morgan	PTS	15	May 24, 1928	Madison Square Garden, New York City, New York, US	For NYSAC, NBA, and The Ring junior lightweight titles
84	Win	74–5–2 (3)	Tiger Brown	KO	1 (10)	May 10, 1928	Garden Palace, Passaic, New Jersey, US	
83	Win	73–5–2 (3)	Davey Abad	PTS	10	Mar 16, 1928	Madison Square Garden, New York City, New York, US	
82	Win	72–5–2 (3)	Johnny Huber	KO	2 (6), 1:37	Mar 5, 1928	St. Nicholas Arena, New York City, New York, US	
81	Win	71–5–2 (3)	Jacques Pettibon	TKO	3 (?)	Feb 27, 1928	St. Nicholas Arena, New York City, New York, US	
80	Win	70–5–2 (3)	Dominick Petrone	PTS	10	Jan 23, 1928	Broadway Arena, New York City, New York, US	
79	Win	69–5–2 (3)	Cowboy Eddie Anderson	PTS	10	Oct 31, 1927	Broadway Arena, New York City, New York, US	
78	Win	68–5–2 (3)	Pancho Dencio	PTS	6	Oct 22, 1927	Ridgewood Grove, New York City, New York, US	
77	Win	67–5–2 (3)	Spencer Gardner	PTS	6	May 14, 1927	Long Beach Stadium, Long Beach, New York, US	
76	Win	66–5–2 (3)	Al 'Rube' Goldberg	PTS	6	May 7, 1927	Ridgewood Grove, New York City, New York, US	
75	Win	65–5–2 (3)	Johnny Curtin	PTS	6	Apr 9, 1927	Ridgewood Grove, New York City, New York, US	
74	Win	64–5–2 (3)	Joe Souza	KO	1 (6), 2:24	Mar 26, 1927	Ridgewood Grove, New York City, New York, US	
73	Loss	63–5–2 (3)	Lew Perfetti	PTS	10	Sep 14, 1925	Queensboro Stadium, New York City, New York, US	
72	Win	63–4–2 (3)	Johnny Curtin	TKO	6 (10), 3:00	Jul 13, 1925	Queensboro Stadium, New York City, New York, US	
71	Loss	62–4–2 (3)	Charley Phil Rosenberg	UD	15	Mar 20, 1925	Madison Square Garden, New York City, New York, US	Lost NYSAC, NBA, and The Ring bantamweight titles
70	Loss	62–3–2 (3)	Pete Sarmiento	NWS	10	Mar 6, 1925	Auditorium, Milwaukee, Wisconsin, US	
69	Loss	62–3–2 (2)	Carl Tremaine	PTS	12	Feb 24, 1925	Public Hall, Cleveland, Ohio, US	
68	Win	62–2–2 (2)	Willie Spencer	NWS	12	Feb 16, 1925	Exposition Building, Portland, Maine, US	NYSAC, NBA, and The Ring bantamweight titles at stake; (via KO only)
67	Win	62–2–2 (1)	Tommy Murray	PTS	10	Jan 12, 1925	Arena, Philadelphia, Pennsylvania, US	
66	NC	61–2–2 (1)	Augie Pisano	NC	3 (6)	Jan 7, 1925	Ridgewood Grove, New York City, New York, US	Referee declared neither fighters were "trying"
65	Win	61–2–2	Abe Goldstein	SD	15	Dec 19, 1924	Madison Square Garden, New York City, New York, US	Won NYSAC, NBA, and The Ring bantamweight titles
64	Win	60–2–2	Johnny Curtin	PTS	12	Nov 6, 1924	Rink S.C., New York City, New York, US	
63	Win	59–2–2	Bobby Wolgast	DQ	8 (10)	Oct 6, 1924	Mechanics Building, Boston, Massachusetts, US	Wolgast DQ'd for holding
62	Win	58–2–2	Battling Harry Leonard	TKO	8 (12)	Sep 25, 1924	Clermont Avenue Rink, New York City, New York, US	
61	Win	57–2–2	Charley Kohler	KO	4 (6)	Sep 13, 1924	Ridgewood Grove, New York City, New York, US	
60	Win	56–2–2	Battling Harry Leonard	PTS	12	Jul 11, 1924	Steeplechase A.A., New York City, New York, US	
59	Win	55–2–2	Charley Goodman	PTS	12	Jun 24, 1924	Nostrand A.C., New York City, New York, US	
58	Win	54–2–2	Sammy Nable	KO	5 (10)	Jun 20, 1924	Henderson's Bowl, New York City, New York, US	
57	Win	53–2–2	Jackie Snyder	PTS	10	May 23, 1924	Henderson's Bowl, New York City, New York, US	
56	Draw	52–2–2	Charley Phil Rosenberg	PTS	10	Apr 29, 1924	Madison Square Garden, New York City, New York, US	
55	Win	52–2–1	Al Pettingill	TKO	4 (10), 1:45	Apr 22, 1924	Pioneer Sporting Club, New York City, New York, US	
54	Win	51–2–1	Joe Souza	PTS	10	Apr 14, 1924	Broadway Arena, New York City, New York, US	
53	Win	50–2–1	Buck Josephs	PTS	6	Feb 18, 1924	Broadway Arena, New York City, New York, US	
52	Win	49–2–1	Midget Smith	PTS	6	Feb 4, 1924	Lenox A.C., New York City, New York, US	
51	Win	48–2–1	Charley Phil Rosenberg	PTS	6	Jan 28, 1924	Madison Square Garden, New York City, New York, US	
50	Win	47–2–1	Sonny Smith	PTS	6	Jan 17, 1924	Rink S.C., New York City, New York, US	
49	Win	46–2–1	Sonny Smith	PTS	6	Dec 17, 1923	Madison Square Garden, New York City, New York, US	
48	Win	45–2–1	Wilbur Cohen	PTS	6	Dec 11, 1923	Ridgewood Grove, New York City, New York, US	
47	Win	44–2–1	Tommy Galston	PTS	6	Dec 6, 1923	Rink S.C., New York City, New York, US	
46	Win	43–2–1	Charley Phil Rosenberg	PTS	6	Nov 29, 1923	Madison Square Garden, New York City, New York, US	
45	Win	42–2–1	Harry London	KO	1 (6), 2:33	Nov 12, 1923	Broadway Arena, New York City, New York, US	
44	Win	41–2–1	Johnny Vestri	PTS	6	Nov 1, 1923	Rink S.C., New York City, New York, US	
43	Win	40–2–1	Billy Ryckoff	KO	5 (?)	Oct 22, 1923	Broadway Arena, New York City, New York, US	
42	Win	39–2–1	Tommy Lynch	PTS	6	Oct 13, 1923	Ridgewood Grove, New York City, New York, US	
41	Win	38–2–1	Johnny Vestri	PTS	6	Sep 17, 1923	Broadway Arena, New York City, New York, US	
40	Win	37–2–1	Buck Josephs	PTS	6	Sep 8, 1923	Ridgewood Grove, New York City, New York, US	
39	Win	36–2–1	Frankie Coster	PTS	6	Aug 18, 1923	Ridgewood Grove, New York City, New York, US	
38	Win	35–2–1	Joe Zellers	KO	2 (?)	Jul 28, 1923	Ridgewood Grove, New York City, New York, US	
37	Win	34–2–1	Joe Ryder	PTS	6	Jul 18, 1923	Velodrome, New York City, New York, US	
36	Draw	33–2–1	Joe Ryder	PTS	6	May 24, 1923	Broadway Arena, New York City, New York, US	
35	Win	33–2	Tommy Galston	PTS	6	May 18, 1923	Clermont Avenue Rink, New York City, New York, US	
34	Win	32–2	Sonny Smith	PTS	6	May 3, 1923	Madison Square Garden, New York City, New York, US	
33	Win	31–2	Jackie Murray	PTS	6	Apr 21, 1923	Ridgewood Grove S.C., New York City, New York, US	
32	Win	30–2	Mickey Romano	PTS	6	Apr 7, 1923	Clermont Avenue Rink, New York City, New York, US	
31	Win	29–2	Jimmy Barton	PTS	6	Apr 2, 1923	Broadway Arena, New York City, New York, US	
30	Win	28–2	Wally Lamb	KO	1 (6)	Mar 29, 1923	Broadway Arena, New York City, New York, US	
29	Win	27–2	Jackie Gordon	TKO	5 (?)	Mar 24, 1923	Ridgewood Grove S.C., New York City, New York, US	
28	Win	26–2	Corona Kid	PTS	6	Mar 17, 1923	Clermont Avenue Rink, New York City, New York, US	
27	Win	25–2	Carl Rindone	TKO	2 (6), 2:05	Mar 3, 1923	Rink S.C., New York City, New York, US	
26	Win	24–2	Jackie Marlowe	KO	2 (?)	Feb 24, 1923	Ridgewood Grove, New York City, New York, US	
25	Win	23–2	Paulie Porter	KO	3 (?)	Feb 10, 1923	Ridgewood Grove, New York City, New York, US	
24	Win	22–2	Willie Clarkson	TKO	1 (6)	Feb 3, 1923	Rink S.C., New York City, New York, US	
23	Win	21–2	Johnny Vinney	PTS	4	Jan 27, 1923	Ridgewood Grove S.C., New York City, New York, US	
22	Win	20–2	Jerry Sullivan	KO	4 (?)	Jan 6, 1923	Ridgewood Grove S.C., New York City, New York, US	
21	Win	19–2	Augie Pisano	PTS	6	Dec 21, 1922	Clermont Avenue Rink, New York City, New York, US	
20	Win	18–2	Scotty Malcomb	PTS	6	Dec 11, 1922	Brighton S.C., New York City, New York, US	
19	Win	17–2	Billy Bell	KO	4 (?)	Nov 30, 1922	Clermont Avenue Rink, New York City, New York, US	
18	Win	16–2	Joe Wright	KO	3 (?)	Nov 25, 1922	Ridgewood Grove S.C., New York City, New York, US	
17	Win	15–2	Willie O'Connell	PTS	6	Nov 20, 1922	Brighton S.C., New York City, New York, US	
16	Win	14–2	Jackie Stone	PTS	6	Nov 5, 1922	Yonkers, New York, US	
15	Loss	13–2	Howard Mayberry	PTS	4	Nov 3, 1922	Clermont Avenue Rink, New York City, New York, US	
14	Win	13–1	Freddie Seed	KO	1 (4)	Nov 3, 1922	Clermont Avenue Rink, New York City, New York, US	
13	Win	12–1	Jimmy Collins	TKO	2 (4)	Oct 26, 1922	Columbus Hall, Yonkers, New York, US	
12	Win	11–1	Willie Mack	PTS	4	Oct 21, 1922	Ridgewood Grove S.C., New York City, New York, US	
11	Win	10–1	Willie Mack	PTS	4	Sep 16, 1922	Ridgewood Grove S.C., New York City, New York, US	
10	Win	9–1	Petey Mack	PTS	4	Sep 15, 1922	New York City, New York, US	
9	Win	8–1	Young Skelly	PTS	6	Jul 10, 1922	Broadway Arena, New York City, New York, US	
8	Win	7–1	Young Shane	KO	4 (4)	Jun 10, 1922	Clermont Avenue Rink, New York City, New York, US	
7	Win	6–1	Charley Furey	PTS	4	Jun 5, 1922	New York City, New York, US	
6	Win	5–1	Joe Layden	KO	1 (?)	May 1, 1922	New York City, New York, US	
5	Win	4–1	Jack North	KO	3 (?)	Apr 23, 1922	New York City, New York, US	
4	Win	3–1	Benny Tell	PTS	4	Apr 5, 1922	New York City, New York, US	
3	Win	2–1	Paul Raymond	PTS	4	Mar 25, 1922	New York City, New York, US	
2	Loss	1–1	Artie Downs	PTS	4	Mar 16, 1922	Broadway Arena, New York City, New York, US	
1	Win	1–0	Sammy Jackson	KO	2 (4)	Dec 1, 1921	Jamaica A.C., New York City, New York, US	Professional debut. Not Mar 22, 1922

=== Unofficial record ===
101 fights	82 wins	14 losses
By knockout	29	3
By decision	52	11
By disqualification	1	0
Draws	4	
No contests	1	

Record with the inclusion of newspaper decisions in the win/loss/draw column.

No.	Result	Record	Opponent	Type	Round	Date	Location	Notes
101	Loss	82–14–4 (1)	Al Dunbar	PTS	10	May 19, 1932	Fort Hamilton Arena, New York City, New York, US	
100	Win	82–13–4 (1)	Harry Baron	PTS	6	Feb 19, 1932	Stauch's Arena, New York City, New York, US	
99	Loss	81–13–4 (1)	Al Singer	TKO	2 (10), 1:31	Aug 28, 1931	Coney Island Stadium, New York City, New York, US	
98	Draw	81–12–4 (1)	Joey Kaufman	PTS	6	May 1, 1931	Stauch's Arena, New York City, New York, US	
97	Win	81–12–3 (1)	Jackie Cohen	PTS	10	Mar 23, 1931	Prospect Hall, New York City, New York, US	
96	Loss	80–12–3 (1)	Marty Goldman	KO	9 (10)	Aug 11, 1930	Dexter Park Arena, New York City, New York, US	
95	Win	80–11–3 (1)	Jack Giraldo	KO	2 (4)	Jul 26, 1930	Ridgewood Grove, New York City, New York, US	
94	Loss	79–11–3 (1)	Young Zazzarino	KO	7 (10)	Sep 4, 1929	Bayonne, Louisiana, US	
93	Loss	79–10–3 (1)	Johnny Dundee	PTS	10	Jul 8, 1929	Dexter Park Arena, New York City, New York, US	
92	Loss	79–9–3 (1)	Davey Abad	NWS	10	May 3, 1929	Coliseum, Saint Louis, Missouri, US	
91	Draw	79–8–3 (1)	Al 'Rube' Goldberg	PTS	6	Mar 23, 1929	Ridgewood Grove, New York City, New York, US	
90	Win	79–8–2 (1)	Joe Barbara	PTS	6	Mar 9, 1929	Ridgewood Grove, New York City, New York, US	
89	Win	78–8–2 (1)	George Nickfor	PTS	6	Feb 23, 1929	Ridgewood Grove, New York City, New York, US	
88	Win	77–8–2 (1)	Herman Wallace	TKO	3 (?)	Dec 29, 1928	Ridgewood Grove, New York City, New York, US	
87	Win	76–8–2 (1)	Jackie Cohen	PTS	6	Nov 24, 1928	Ridgewood Grove, New York City, New York, US	
86	Loss	75–8–2 (1)	Tod Morgan	PTS	15	Jul 18, 1928	Ebbets Field, New York City, New York, US	For NYSAC, NBA, and The Ring junior lightweight titles
85	Loss	75–7–2 (1)	Tod Morgan	PTS	15	May 24, 1928	Madison Square Garden, New York City, New York, US	For NYSAC, NBA, and The Ring junior lightweight titles
84	Win	75–6–2 (1)	Tiger Brown	KO	1 (10)	May 10, 1928	Garden Palace, Passaic, New Jersey, US	
83	Win	74–6–2 (1)	Davey Abad	PTS	10	Mar 16, 1928	Madison Square Garden, New York City, New York, US	
82	Win	73–6–2 (1)	Johnny Huber	KO	2 (6), 1:37	Mar 5, 1928	St. Nicholas Arena, New York City, New York, US	
81	Win	72–6–2 (1)	Jacques Pettibon	TKO	3 (?)	Feb 27, 1928	St. Nicholas Arena, New York City, New York, US	
80	Win	71–6–2 (1)	Dominick Petrone	PTS	10	Jan 23, 1928	Broadway Arena, New York City, New York, US	
79	Win	70–6–2 (1)	Cowboy Eddie Anderson	PTS	10	Oct 31, 1927	Broadway Arena, New York City, New York, US	
78	Win	69–6–2 (1)	Pancho Dencio	PTS	6	Oct 22, 1927	Ridgewood Grove, New York City, New York, US	
77	Win	68–6–2 (1)	Spencer Gardner	PTS	6	May 14, 1927	Long Beach Stadium, Long Beach, New York, US	
76	Win	67–6–2 (1)	Al 'Rube' Goldberg	PTS	6	May 7, 1927	Ridgewood Grove, New York City, New York, US	
75	Win	66–6–2 (1)	Johnny Curtin	PTS	6	Apr 9, 1927	Ridgewood Grove, New York City, New York, US	
74	Win	65–6–2 (1)	Joe Souza	KO	1 (6), 2:24	Mar 26, 1927	Ridgewood Grove, New York City, New York, US	
73	Loss	64–6–2 (1)	Lew Perfetti	PTS	10	Sep 14, 1925	Queensboro Stadium, New York City, New York, US	
72	Win	64–5–2 (1)	Johnny Curtin	TKO	6 (10), 3:00	Jul 13, 1925	Queensboro Stadium, New York City, New York, US	
71	Loss	63–5–2 (1)	Charley Phil Rosenberg	UD	15	Mar 20, 1925	Madison Square Garden, New York City, New York, US	Lost NYSAC, NBA, and The Ring bantamweight titles
70	Loss	63–4–2 (1)	Pete Sarmiento	NWS	10	Mar 6, 1925	Auditorium, Milwaukee, Wisconsin, US	
69	Loss	63–3–2 (1)	Carl Tremaine	PTS	12	Feb 24, 1925	Public Hall, Cleveland, Ohio, US	
68	Win	63–2–2 (1)	Willie Spencer	NWS	12	Feb 16, 1925	Exposition Building, Portland, Maine, US	NYSAC, NBA, and The Ring bantamweight titles at stake; (via KO only)
67	Win	62–2–2 (1)	Tommy Murray	PTS	10	Jan 12, 1925	Arena, Philadelphia, Pennsylvania, US	
66	NC	61–2–2 (1)	Augie Pisano	NC	3 (6)	Jan 7, 1925	Ridgewood Grove, New York City, New York, US	Referee declared neither fighters were "trying"
65	Win	61–2–2	Abe Goldstein	SD	15	Dec 19, 1924	Madison Square Garden, New York City, New York, US	Won NYSAC, NBA, and The Ring bantamweight titles
64	Win	60–2–2	Johnny Curtin	PTS	12	Nov 6, 1924	Rink S.C., New York City, New York, US	
63	Win	59–2–2	Bobby Wolgast	DQ	8 (10)	Oct 6, 1924	Mechanics Building, Boston, Massachusetts, US	Wolgast DQ'd for holding
62	Win	58–2–2	Battling Harry Leonard	TKO	8 (12)	Sep 25, 1924	Clermont Avenue Rink, New York City, New York, US	
61	Win	57–2–2	Charley Kohler	KO	4 (6)	Sep 13, 1924	Ridgewood Grove, New York City, New York, US	
60	Win	56–2–2	Battling Harry Leonard	PTS	12	Jul 11, 1924	Steeplechase A.A., New York City, New York, US	
59	Win	55–2–2	Charley Goodman	PTS	12	Jun 24, 1924	Nostrand A.C., New York City, New York, US	
58	Win	54–2–2	Sammy Nable	KO	5 (10)	Jun 20, 1924	Henderson's Bowl, New York City, New York, US	
57	Win	53–2–2	Jackie Snyder	PTS	10	May 23, 1924	Henderson's Bowl, New York City, New York, US	
56	Draw	52–2–2	Charley Phil Rosenberg	PTS	10	Apr 29, 1924	Madison Square Garden, New York City, New York, US	
55	Win	52–2–1	Al Pettingill	TKO	4 (10), 1:45	Apr 22, 1924	Pioneer Sporting Club, New York City, New York, US	
54	Win	51–2–1	Joe Souza	PTS	10	Apr 14, 1924	Broadway Arena, New York City, New York, US	
53	Win	50–2–1	Buck Josephs	PTS	6	Feb 18, 1924	Broadway Arena, New York City, New York, US	
52	Win	49–2–1	Midget Smith	PTS	6	Feb 4, 1924	Lenox A.C., New York City, New York, US	
51	Win	48–2–1	Charley Phil Rosenberg	PTS	6	Jan 28, 1924	Madison Square Garden, New York City, New York, US	
50	Win	47–2–1	Sonny Smith	PTS	6	Jan 17, 1924	Rink S.C., New York City, New York, US	
49	Win	46–2–1	Sonny Smith	PTS	6	Dec 17, 1923	Madison Square Garden, New York City, New York, US	
48	Win	45–2–1	Wilbur Cohen	PTS	6	Dec 11, 1923	Ridgewood Grove, New York City, New York, US	
47	Win	44–2–1	Tommy Galston	PTS	6	Dec 6, 1923	Rink S.C., New York City, New York, US	
46	Win	43–2–1	Charley Phil Rosenberg	PTS	6	Nov 29, 1923	Madison Square Garden, New York City, New York, US	
45	Win	42–2–1	Harry London	KO	1 (6), 2:33	Nov 12, 1923	Broadway Arena, New York City, New York, US	
44	Win	41–2–1	Johnny Vestri	PTS	6	Nov 1, 1923	Rink S.C., New York City, New York, US	
43	Win	40–2–1	Billy Ryckoff	KO	5 (?)	Oct 22, 1923	Broadway Arena, New York City, New York, US	
42	Win	39–2–1	Tommy Lynch	PTS	6	Oct 13, 1923	Ridgewood Grove, New York City, New York, US	
41	Win	38–2–1	Johnny Vestri	PTS	6	Sep 17, 1923	Broadway Arena, New York City, New York, US	
40	Win	37–2–1	Buck Josephs	PTS	6	Sep 8, 1923	Ridgewood Grove, New York City, New York, US	
39	Win	36–2–1	Frankie Coster	PTS	6	Aug 18, 1923	Ridgewood Grove, New York City, New York, US	
38	Win	35–2–1	Joe Zellers	KO	2 (?)	Jul 28, 1923	Ridgewood Grove, New York City, New York, US	
37	Win	34–2–1	Joe Ryder	PTS	6	Jul 18, 1923	Velodrome, New York City, New York, US	
36	Draw	33–2–1	Joe Ryder	PTS	6	May 24, 1923	Broadway Arena, New York City, New York, US	
35	Win	33–2	Tommy Galston	PTS	6	May 18, 1923	Clermont Avenue Rink, New York City, New York, US	
34	Win	32–2	Sonny Smith	PTS	6	May 3, 1923	Madison Square Garden, New York City, New York, US	
33	Win	31–2	Jackie Murray	PTS	6	Apr 21, 1923	Ridgewood Grove S.C., New York City, New York, US	
32	Win	30–2	Mickey Romano	PTS	6	Apr 7, 1923	Clermont Avenue Rink, New York City, New York, US	
31	Win	29–2	Jimmy Barton	PTS	6	Apr 2, 1923	Broadway Arena, New York City, New York, US	
30	Win	28–2	Wally Lamb	KO	1 (6)	Mar 29, 1923	Broadway Arena, New York City, New York, US	
29	Win	27–2	Jackie Gordon	TKO	5 (?)	Mar 24, 1923	Ridgewood Grove S.C., New York City, New York, US	
28	Win	26–2	Corona Kid	PTS	6	Mar 17, 1923	Clermont Avenue Rink, New York City, New York, US	
27	Win	25–2	Carl Rindone	TKO	2 (6), 2:05	Mar 3, 1923	Rink S.C., New York City, New York, US	
26	Win	24–2	Jackie Marlowe	KO	2 (?)	Feb 24, 1923	Ridgewood Grove, New York City, New York, US	
25	Win	23–2	Paulie Porter	KO	3 (?)	Feb 10, 1923	Ridgewood Grove, New York City, New York, US	
24	Win	22–2	Willie Clarkson	TKO	1 (6)	Feb 3, 1923	Rink S.C., New York City, New York, US	
23	Win	21–2	Johnny Vinney	PTS	4	Jan 27, 1923	Ridgewood Grove S.C., New York City, New York, US	
22	Win	20–2	Jerry Sullivan	KO	4 (?)	Jan 6, 1923	Ridgewood Grove S.C., New York City, New York, US	
21	Win	19–2	Augie Pisano	PTS	6	Dec 21, 1922	Clermont Avenue Rink, New York City, New York, US	
20	Win	18–2	Scotty Malcomb	PTS	6	Dec 11, 1922	Brighton S.C., New York City, New York, US	
19	Win	17–2	Billy Bell	KO	4 (?)	Nov 30, 1922	Clermont Avenue Rink, New York City, New York, US	
18	Win	16–2	Joe Wright	KO	3 (?)	Nov 25, 1922	Ridgewood Grove S.C., New York City, New York, US	
17	Win	15–2	Willie O'Connell	PTS	6	Nov 20, 1922	Brighton S.C., New York City, New York, US	
16	Win	14–2	Jackie Stone	PTS	6	Nov 5, 1922	Yonkers, New York, US	
15	Loss	13–2	Howard Mayberry	PTS	4	Nov 3, 1922	Clermont Avenue Rink, New York City, New York, US	
14	Win	13–1	Freddie Seed	KO	1 (4)	Nov 3, 1922	Clermont Avenue Rink, New York City, New York, US	
13	Win	12–1	Jimmy Collins	TKO	2 (4)	Oct 26, 1922	Columbus Hall, Yonkers, New York, US	
12	Win	11–1	Willie Mack	PTS	4	Oct 21, 1922	Ridgewood Grove S.C., New York City, New York, US	
11	Win	10–1	Willie Mack	PTS	4	Sep 16, 1922	Ridgewood Grove S.C., New York City, New York, US	
10	Win	9–1	Petey Mack	PTS	4	Sep 15, 1922	New York City, New York, US	
9	Win	8–1	Young Skelly	PTS	6	Jul 10, 1922	Broadway Arena, New York City, New York, US	
8	Win	7–1	Young Shane	KO	4 (4)	Jun 10, 1922	Clermont Avenue Rink, New York City, New York, US	
7	Win	6–1	Charley Furey	PTS	4	Jun 5, 1922	New York City, New York, US	
6	Win	5–1	Joe Layden	KO	1 (?)	May 1, 1922	New York City, New York, US	
5	Win	4–1	Jack North	KO	3 (?)	Apr 23, 1922	New York City, New York, US	
4	Win	3–1	Benny Tell	PTS	4	Apr 5, 1922	New York City, New York, US	
3	Win	2–1	Paul Raymond	PTS	4	Mar 25, 1922	New York City, New York, US	
2	Loss	1–1	Artie Downs	PTS	4	Mar 16, 1922	Broadway Arena, New York City, New York, US	
1	Win	1–0	Sammy Jackson	KO	2 (4)	Dec 1, 1921	Jamaica A.C., New York City, New York, US	Professional debut. Not Mar 22, 1922

== Titles in boxing ==
=== Major world titles ===
- NYSAC bantamweight champion (118 lbs)
- NBA (WBA) bantamweight champion (118 lbs)

=== The Ring magazine titles ===
- The Ring bantamweight champion (118 lbs)

=== Undisputed titles ===
- Undisputed bantamweight champion

== See also ==
- List of lineal boxing world champions
- List of bantamweight boxing champions

Achievements
Preceded by Abe Goldstein	World Bantamweight Champion; 19 December 1924 – 20 March 1925	Succeeded by Charley Phil Rosenberg
