= Memphis Pal Moore =

American boxer (1894–1953)

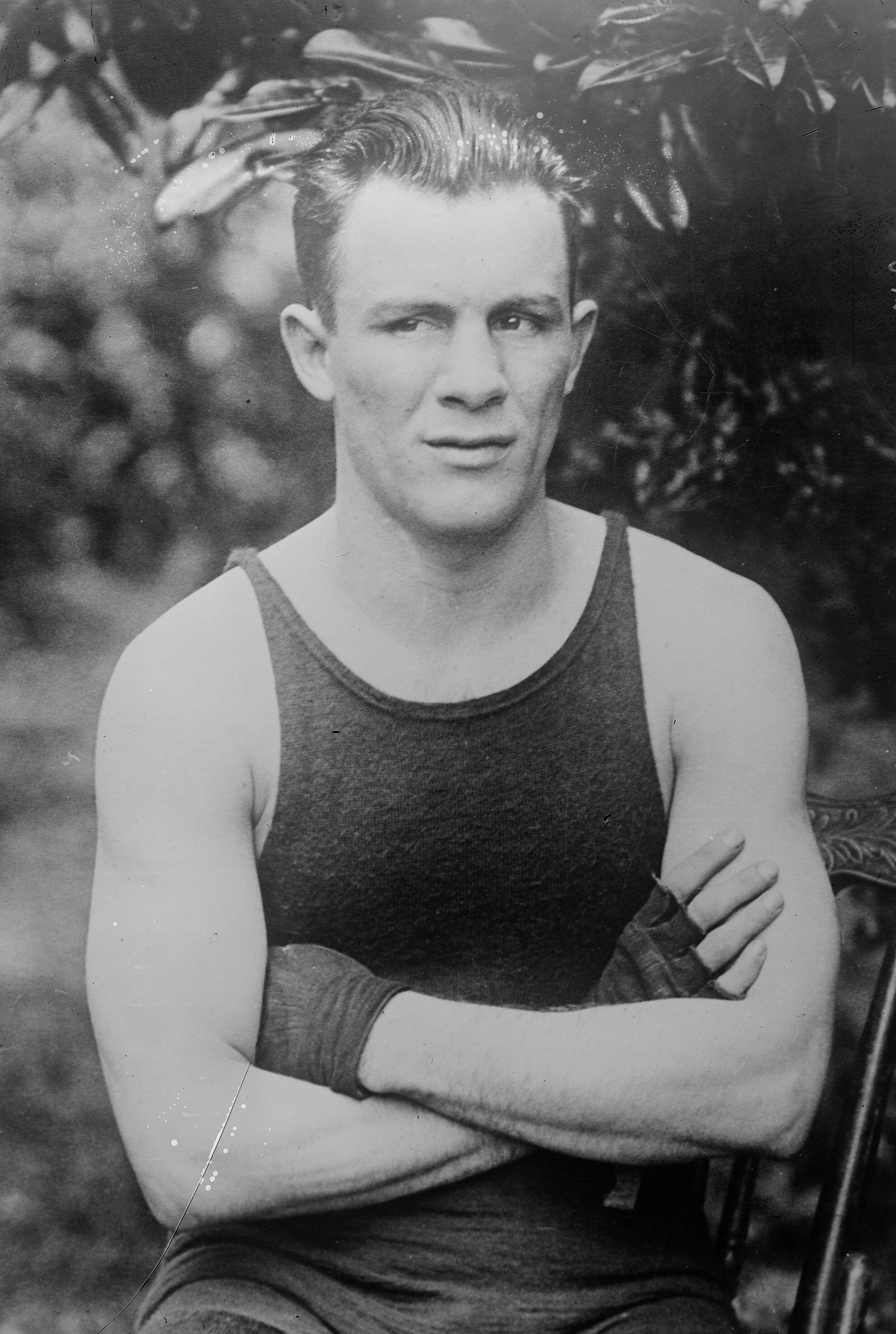

Personal information
- Nickname: The Human Jumping Jack
- Born: Thomas Wilson Moore; July 28, 1894 Kenton, Tennessee, U.S.
- Died: March 15, 1953 (aged 58) Memphis, Tennessee, U.S.
- Height: 5 ft 5 in (1.65 m)
- Weight: Bantamweight

Boxing career
- Reach: 66 in (168 cm)
- Stance: Orthodox

Boxing record
- Total fights: 265; with the inclusion of newspaper decisions
- Wins: 170
- Win by KO: 11
- Losses: 56
- Draws: 38
- No contests: 1

Memphis Pal Moore (born Thomas Wilson Moore) was an American boxer from Memphis, Tennessee, who claimed the World Bantamweight Championship in 1918 defeating championship claimant Johnny Ertle in Baltimore. He was rated as the seventeenth best bantamweight of all time by boxing.com, and was elected to the International Boxing Hall of Fame in 2010.

Managed by Tommy Walsh, Moore fought over 260 fights. He fought over thirty bouts with fifteen world champions, of which he impressively won nineteen.

== Boxing record ==
=== Early boxing career ===
Moore was born on July 28, 1894, in Kenton, Tennessee. Beginning in 1913 in the Memphis area, he was undefeated in his first 10 fights.

On March 25, 1915, Moore defeated Italian boxer Young Zulu Kid in a ten-round points decision in New Orleans, Louisiana. He would defeat the talented Zulu Kid two more times, on January 13, 1916, in an eight-round points decision in his hometown of Memphis and on August 5, 1916, in a ten-round newspaper decision in Brooklyn.

On October 28, 1915, Moore defeated gifted boxer Kid Williams decisively in a non-title, eight-round newspaper decision of The Washington Post. Williams was down twice in the bout. Williams had taken the World Bantamweight Championship in June 1914 and held it through 1917. As early as 1915, Moore had clearly identified himself as a top bantamweight and a serious contender for the World Bantamweight Championship, but he would be granted precious few shots at the title.

=== Defeating future bantamweight champion Pete Herman in early career ===
Champion Pete Herman

On November 15, 1915, Moore defeated Pete Herman for the first time in an eight-round points decision in Memphis, Tennessee. On March 24, 1919, Moore likely defeated Herman again according to the eight-round newspaper decision of the Memphis Commercial Appeal on March 24, 1919, at the New Lyric Theatre in Memphis. The bout was not recorded as a title match, but the title may have changed hands if Moore had knocked out Herman. Herman held the World Bantamweight Championship almost continuously from January 1917 through September 1921 excluding the first seven months of 1921. Surprisingly, Moore never had the opportunity to challenge Herman again for the World Bantamweight Title.

On February 20, 1917, Moore first met Jack "Kid" Wolfe, losing in a fourth-round technical knockout in Cleveland, Ohio. Moore claimed he had broken his arm in the bout. Four months later, after healing, on June 18 of that year Moore defeated Wolfe in an eight-round points decision in his home of Memphis. On May 3, 1920, Moore would defeat Wolfe again in an eighth round points decision at the Southern Athletic Club in Memphis. In his career, Wolfe would take a version of the Jr. Featherweight Championship in September 1922 against Joe Lynch, thought the NYSAC did not recognize the title.

Moore fought Frankie Burns in Boston to a draw on July 24, 1917, and in a loss by decision on August 2, 1918, in Jersey City, New Jersey. Burns was a top-ranked bantamweight and would contend four times for the World Bantamweight Championship between 1912 and 1917.

==== First bouts with Joe Lynch 1917–18 ====
On October 27, 1917, Moore first met Joe Lynch, drawing with him in ten rounds at the Fairmont Athletic Club in the Bronx. On December 21, 1917, he lost to Lynch at Thornton, Rhode Island in a twelve-round points decision. On January 11, 1918, he legitimately defeated Lynch in a twelve-round points decision in Providence.

=== Boxing and serving with the US Navy at Great Lakes Station around WWI ===
He honed his boxing skills while serving as a sailor in the United States Navy. He served as a boxing instructor while in the Navy. He was selected as a boxing representative and sent to England for a tournament of the Allied nations after the end of World War I. He served at the historic Great Lakes Naval Station outside Chicago, and completed his service shortly after 1919.

=== Claiming the World Bantamweight Championship, Johnny Ertle, April 1918 ===
Moore fought Johnny Ertle claimant of the World Bantamweight championship in Baltimore on April 10, 1918, defeating Ertle by decision. The Indianapolis News wrote that Moore had taken the decision with "great ease". Moore claimed the World Bantamweight Championship as a result of this win, but was not universally recognized to have held the title and is not recognized today. Moore had first defeated Ertle in a controversial eight-round decision on April 5, 1916, in Memphis.

=== ISBA Allied Forces King's Trophy Bantamweight Competition ===
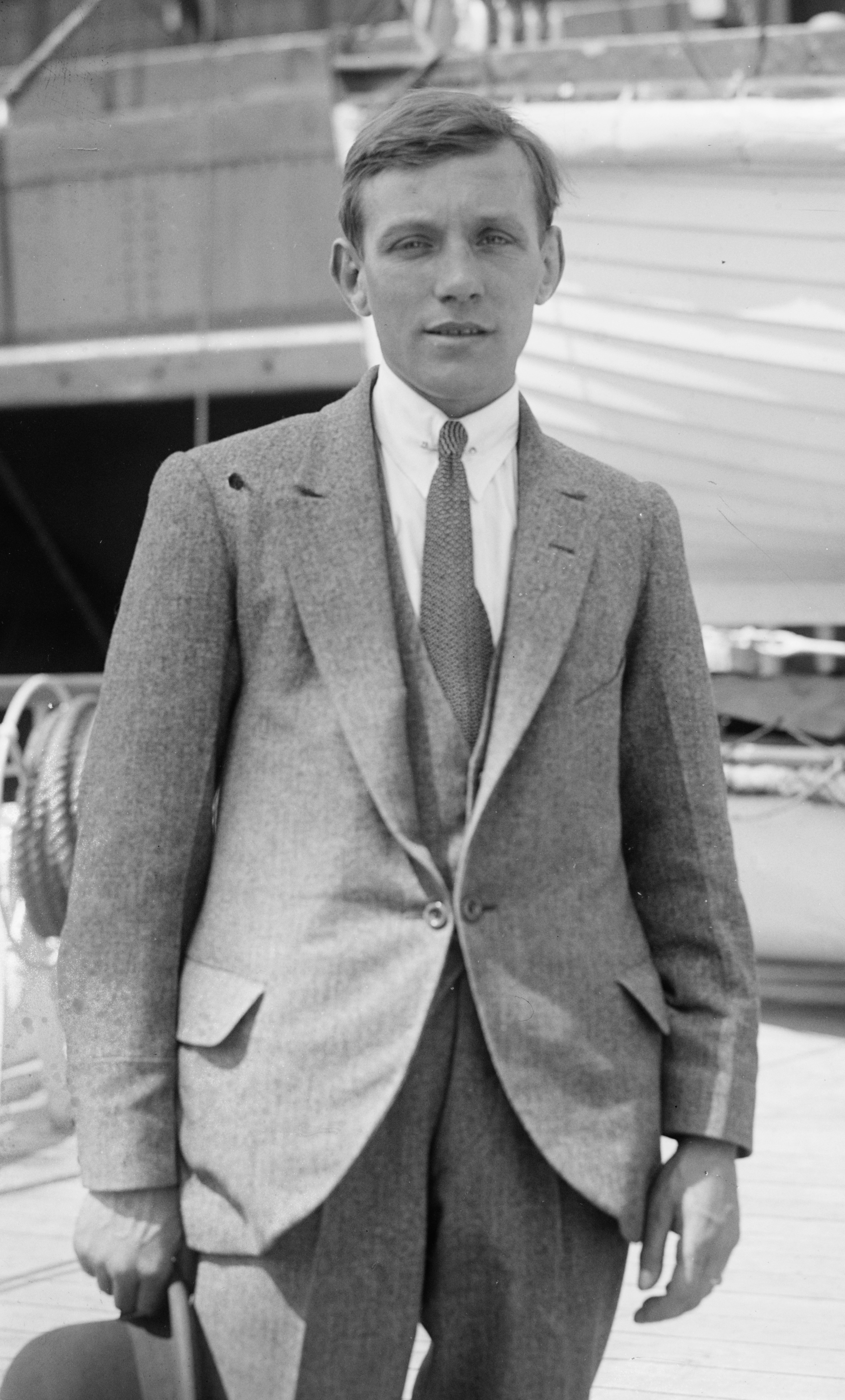
Flyweight Jimmy Wilde

Moore fought Jimmy Wilde on July 17, 1919, in London, while still in the Navy. The bout was part of the Finals for the ISBA King's Trophy Bantamweight Competition. Moore won by decision and took the King's Bantamweight Trophy by some American accounts, but officially lost the decision according to the British referee and judges present at the bout. Wilde was the Welsh-born World Flyweight Champion impressively for seven years from 1916 to 1923, and held the title at the time of his bout with Moore.

==== Match with French champion Eugene Criqui, December 1919 ====
On December 26, 1919, while still serving in the US Navy, Moore defeated the great French boxer Eugene Criqui at the Royal Albert Hall in Kensington, London in a fourteenth-round technical knockout. According to the Scranton Republican, Criqui was "severely trounced" and the blow that ended the battle was a right hook to the stomach, which the referee did not call as a low blow. The audience contained a number of Americans, including Moore's fellow navy companions. Criqui would hold the French Featherweight Title in 1921, the European Featherweight Title in 1922, and the World Featherweight Title in 1923.

On March 19, 1920, he defeated Johnny Buff in an eighth-round newspaper decision of the Wilkes-Barre Times Leader. Buff would take the World Bantamweight Championship on September 23, 1921. In another meeting, on December 15, 1921, Moore defeated Buff in a ten-round newspaper decision of the Milwaukee Journal in Milwaukee.

=== Bouts with 1920–21 World Bantamweight Champion Joe Lynch, most frequent opponent ===
Joe Lynch was Moore's most frequent opponent, meeting him ten times. Fortunately for Lynch, he never fought a title bout with Moore based on points during Lynch's reign as bantamweight champion, but this was common during boxing's "no decision" era. On May 24, 1920, Moore lost to Joe Lynch in the decision of The Jersey Journal in twelve rounds at Jersey City, New Jersey. The Journal wrote that Moore slapped with his gloves, a tactic that sometimes lost him points in his fights, but that Lynch landed clean punches, giving him nine of the twelve rounds. Nonetheless, Moore was observed as having put up a game fight, pressing the issue throughout the bout. Other sources considered the bout slightly closer. On October 26, 1920, Moore drew with Lynch according to the newspapers in St. Louis. Moore's holding cost him the decision as he carried the fight to his opponent in nearly every round. On May 6, 1921, Moore defeated Lynch in twelve by decision of the Courier Journal in Louisville, Kentucky. Other newspapers considered the bout too close to call, as in the twelfth round Lynch, reigning champion, tried hard to knockout Moore, and effectively used his left jab throughout. Many spectators considered the bout the best between Moore and Lynch.

On September 4, 1922, the newspapers gave a twelve-round decision to Lynch in Indiana before a significant crowd of 8,000. In this instance, Lynch had a decisive victory, knocking Moore to the canvas twice in the seventh round, for counts of six and four. Jack Dempsey fought an exhibition in the first match before the crowded house. On November 27, 1923, Moore defeated Lynch by a ten-round newspaper decision in St. Louis, though the match was considered close and dull by most newspaper accounts. Lynch may have dealt a few blows which connected, but Moore's boxing and scientific defense did not seem as stellar as in his earlier career. On February 24, 1926, Moore drew with Lynch in a ten-round points decision in Ft. Lauderdale, though a few newspapers gave Moore the edge. On March 4, 1926, the Miami Daily News gave the decision to Moore in Miami. Many in the crowd jeered the boxers.

Moore fought Johnny Gannon who was the bantamweight champion of the U.S. Army on March 16, 1921, to a ten-round draw in Rockford, Illinois. Moore fought Kid Pancho in Memphis, winning by decision.

=== Bouts with champion Sammy Mandell, 1921–22 ===
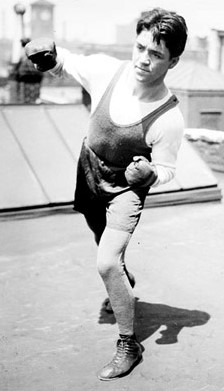
Sammy Mandell

On August 26, 1921, Moore first met Sammy Mandell in Aurora Illinois, losing in a ten-round newspaper decision of the Aurora Daily Star. The bout was the main event of the evening. The Logansport Pharos Tribune believed Mandell may have had the edge in the fairly close bout but noted that "Moore displayed the greater cleverness and landed the most blows", but "Mandell's hitting was more effective". Mandell's strong display in the bout gained him notice a number of boxing reporters. He drew with Mandell in a newspaper decision in Memphis on July 4, 1922. In the fast bout, Mandell had a slight weight advantage and was considered the better puncher which forced Moore to use his speed and science to outbox his opponent. The bout was described as exciting with "The men...on their toes and slugging from the beginning until the end of the bout." The referee present said if he had called the decision, he would have ruled for a draw. Mandell took the World Lightweight Championship on July 3, 1926, and held it for four years.

=== Bouts with Bantamweight Champion Bud Taylor June 1922–January 1923 ===
Moore fought Bud Taylor, holder of the NBA World Bantamweight Championship 1927–28, in four career bouts. Moore was diagnosed with pneumonia around February 9, 1922, and three weeks rest was recommended. Moore's first match with Taylor was a newspaper win by the Aurora Daily Star in Illinois in ten rounds on June 23, 1922. As was not unusual in this stage of Moore's career, he was described as having performed a shade better in his boxing technique, but Taylor was described as landing more solid blows, though the bout was close. The second, Moore won by ten-round newspaper decision of the Chicago Tribune on the USS Commodore (IX-7) off Chicago on December 22, 1922. The third was a ten-round draw by newspaper decision in Indiana on January 15, 1923. Shortly after this bout, Moore expressed his intention to go after the World Flyweight Championship and perhaps face Pancho Villa, but a World Flyweight Championship Match never materialized for Moore. Moore drew in their fourth meeting on February 13, 1923, in Indianapolis by a ten-round newspaper decision of two Indianapolis papers. Once again, one source described Taylor as having connected with more blows in the close bout. The bout was described as a "whale of a battle from start to finish", with each boxer exchanging the lead, though Taylor was described as landing more blows by several newspapers.

Moore also fought Frankie Genaro on April 23, 1923, in Chicago but lost in a sixth-round DQ. The New York Times said the foul was an accidental upper cut to the groin. The foul seemed unintentional as one account wrote that Genaro had jumped six inches off the floor into the punch. According to the El Paso Herald, Moore's loss by foul was his first in eleven years of fighting. Genaro would take the NBA World Flyweight Championship on February 6, 1926, and hold it almost continuously until October 1931.

On December 9, 1924, Moore met the incomparable boxer Jimmy McLarnin before a packed house in Vernon, California, drawing in a four-round points decision. The "wild" bout was described as having abundant action and each boxer was given two rounds. Moore was said to confuse his opponent with his "jumping jack" tactics, but had trouble landing solid blows. Moore was known to prance and sometimes jump from the floor in his bouts. The Los Angeles Times wrote that Moore introduced his own variation of the "kangaroo leap", and that he delivered frequent open gloved slaps to the back of McLarnin's neck, but was adept at keeping out of reach at long range in the close bout. McLarnin would hold multiple weight division world titles in his career.

On July 12, 1927, Moore lost to reigning World Flyweight Champion Fidel LaBarba before a crowd of 18,000, at Wrigley Field, in Chicago, Illinois, in a ten-round points decision. A few newspapers said LaBarba had a clear victory, or that he landed cleaner, stiffer punches, against Moore who threw punches from every angle. There were no knockdowns in the bout, nor obvious injuries.

== Retirement from boxing, death and honors ==
Moore retired from boxing in 1930 after his last bout with Leroy Dougan in Memphis. He died on March 15, 1953, reportedly from a stomach ulcer and a severe asthmatic condition that may have forced him from his ring career. He received twelve decisions over champions in his weight class, but each match was a no-decision bout, and received only newspaper decisions, rather than a points decision for a title. Moore defeated Kid Williams, Joe Lynch, Pete Herman, and Johhny Buff by newspaper decision, and each held the Bantamweight Championship in their career.

In 2010, Pal Moore was selected to join the International Boxing Hall of Fame.

== Professional boxing record ==
All information in this section is derived from BoxRec, unless otherwise stated.

=== Official record ===
265 fights	107 wins	28 losses
By knockout	11	1
By decision	96	24
By disqualification	0	3
Draws	25	
Newspaper decisions/draws	105	

All newspaper decisions are officially regarded as "no decision" bouts and are not counted in the win/loss/draw column.

No.	Result	Record	Opponent	Type	Round	Date	Age	Location	Notes
265	Win	107–28–25 (105)	Leroy Dougan	MD	8	Oct 6, 1930	36 years, 70 days	Ellis Auditorium, Memphis, Tennessee, US	
264	Win	106–28–25 (105)	Bobby Allen	PTS	8	Sep 9, 1930	36 years, 43 days	Congress Outdoor Stadium, Chicago, Illinois, US	
263	Win	105–28–25 (105)	Jackie Stewart	PTS	10	Aug 4, 1930	36 years, 7 days	Shewbridge Field, Chicago, Illinois, US	
262	Loss	104–28–25 (105)	Willie Pellegrini	PTS	8	Jul 8, 1930	35 years, 315 days	Congress Outdoor Stadium, Chicago, Illinois, US	
261	Win	104–27–25 (105)	Bobby Allen	PTS	10	May 14, 1930	35 years, 290 days	Ashland Blvd. Auditorium, Chicago, Illinois, US	
260	Win	103–27–25 (105)	Billy Knowles	PTS	6	Apr 17, 1930	35 years, 263 days	Viking Temple, Chicago, Illinois, US	
259	Win	102–27–25 (105)	Bobby Allen	PTS	10	Mar 31, 1930	35 years, 246 days	Ashland Blvd. Auditorium, Chicago, Illinois, US	
258	Win	101–27–25 (105)	Jackie Stewart	PTS	8	Dec 23, 1929	35 years, 148 days	Rainbo Arena, Chicago, Illinois, US	
257	Win	100–27–25 (105)	Willie Pellegrini	PTS	8	Dec 2, 1929	35 years, 127 days	Rainbo Arena, Chicago, Illinois, US	
256	Loss	99–27–25 (105)	Johnny Nasser	NWS	10	Oct 4, 1929	35 years, 68 days	Tomlinson Hall, Indianapolis, Indiana, US	
255	Loss	99–27–25 (104)	Leroy Dougan	NWS	10	Oct 23, 1928	34 years, 87 days	Jack Shelton Arena, San Antonio, Texas, US	
254	Draw	99–27–25 (103)	Quina Lee	PTS	12	Oct 16, 1928	34 years, 80 days	Fort Bliss Arena, El Paso, Texas, US	
253	Win	99–27–24 (103)	Kid Jap	NWS	10	Apr 16, 1928	33 years, 263 days	Fort Wayne, Indiana, US	
252	Win	99–27–24 (102)	Harry Forbes	NWS	10	Jan 27, 1928	33 years, 183 days	Fort Wayne, Indiana, US	
251	Loss	99–27–24 (101)	Petey Sarron	PTS	8	Oct 17, 1927	33 years, 81 days	Memphis Stadium, Memphis, Tennessee, US	
250	Loss	99–26–24 (101)	Leroy Dougan	UD	10	Sep 12, 1927	33 years, 46 days	American Legion Stadium, Little Rock, Arkansas, US	
249	Loss	99–25–24 (101)	Mickey Cohen	PTS	10	Aug 30, 1927	33 years, 33 days	Denver, Colorado, US	
248	Loss	99–24–24 (101)	Petey Sarron	NWS	10	Aug 1, 1927	33 years, 4 days	Birmingham A.C., Birmingham, Alabama, US	
247	Draw	99–24–24 (100)	Eddie Wolfe	PTS	8	Jul 25, 1927	32 years, 362 days	Memphis Stadium, Memphis, Tennessee, US	
246	Loss	99–24–23 (100)	Fidel LaBarba	PTS	10	Jul 12, 1927	32 years, 349 days	Wrigley Field, Chicago, Illinois, US	
245	Loss	99–23–23 (100)	Charles 'Bud' Taylor	NWS	8	May 9, 1927	32 years, 285 days	Memphis Stadium, Memphis, Tennessee, US	
244	Loss	99–23–23 (99)	Pinky May	PTS	10	Apr 22, 1927	32 years, 268 days	Savannah, Georgia, US	
243	Draw	99–22–23 (99)	Johnny Franks	PTS	8	Apr 18, 1927	32 years, 264 days	Southern A.C., Memphis, Tennessee, US	
242	Win	99–22–22 (99)	Kid Jap	PTS	10	Mar 1, 1927	32 years, 216 days	Coliseum, Chicago, Illinois, US	
241	Loss	98–22–22 (99)	Tommy Milton	PTS	10	Feb 17, 1927	32 years, 204 days	Sokol Hall, Chicago, Illinois, US	
240	Win	98–21–22 (99)	Kid Jap	NWS	10	Feb 11, 1927	32 years, 198 days	Cedar Rapids, Iowa, US	
239	Draw	98–21–22 (98)	Johnny Franks	PTS	8	Jan 31, 1927	32 years, 187 days	Memphis Stadium, Memphis, Tennessee, US	
238	Loss	98–21–21 (98)	Johnny Franks	DQ	3 (8)	Jan 17, 1927	32 years, 173 days	Memphis Stadium, Memphis, Tennessee, US	
237	Draw	98–20–21 (98)	Leroy Dougan	PTS	8	Jan 10, 1927	32 years, 166 days	Memphis Stadium, Memphis, Tennessee, US	
236	Loss	98–20–20 (98)	Midget Mike O'Dowd	NWS	12	Dec 27, 1926	32 years, 152 days	Broadway Arena, Louisville, Kentucky, US	
235	Win	98–20–20 (97)	Midget Mike Moran	NWS	12	Dec 20, 1926	32 years, 145 days	Jefferson County Armory, Louisville, Kentucky, US	
234	Win	98–20–20 (96)	Midget Mike O'Dowd	PTS	8	Nov 29, 1926	32 years, 124 days	Southern A.C., Memphis, Tennessee, US	
233	Win	97–20–20 (96)	Dick Griffin	PTS	10	Nov 17, 1926	32 years, 112 days	Dallas, Texas, US	
232	Loss	96–20–20 (96)	Young Nationalista	PTS	10	Aug 31, 1926	32 years, 34 days	Coliseum, Chicago, Illinois, US	
231	Win	96–19–20 (96)	Mickey Satnick	NWS	10	Aug 21, 1926	32 years, 24 days	Fairgrounds Coliseum, Indianapolis, Indiana, US	
230	Loss	96–19–20 (95)	Jimmy Russo	DQ	9 (10)	Aug 12, 1926	32 years, 15 days	Rockford, Illinois, US	
229	Win	96–18–20 (95)	Tiger Jack Burns	PTS	10	Jul 26, 1926	31 years, 333 days	White City Arena, Chicago, Illinois, US	
228	Draw	95–18–20 (95)	Davey Atler	PTS	10	Jun 11, 1926	31 years, 318 days	Sioux Falls, South Dakota, US	
227	Win	95–18–19 (95)	Kid Lencho	NWS	12	Jun 1, 1926	31 years, 308 days	Block Stadium, San Antonio, Texas, US	
226	Win	95–18–19 (94)	Earl McArthur	PTS	10	May 18, 1926	31 years, 294 days	Sioux Falls, South Dakota, US	
225	Loss	94–18–19 (94)	Happy Atherton	NWS	10	Apr 19, 1926	31 years, 265 days	Tomlinson Hall, Indianapolis, Indiana, US	
224	Win	94–18–19 (93)	Bobby Hughes	PTS	10	Mar 29, 1926	31 years, 244 days	Hot Springs, Arkansas, US	
223	Win	93–18–19 (93)	Joe Lynch	NWS	10	Mar 4, 1926	31 years, 219 days	Miami Field, Miami, Florida, US	
222	Draw	93–18–19 (92)	Joe Lynch	PTS	10	Feb 24, 1926	31 years, 211 days	Municipal Ball Park, Fort Lauderdale, Florida, US	
221	Loss	93–18–18 (92)	Henry Lenard	NWS	10	Jan 22, 1926	31 years, 178 days	Coliseum, Davenport, Iowa, US	
220	Win	93–18–18 (91)	Louis Andrews	NWS	8	Dec 17, 1925	31 years, 142 days	Clarksdale, Tennessee, US	
219	Loss	93–18–18 (90)	Leroy Dougan	PTS	8	Dec 15, 1925	31 years, 140 days	Blytheville, Tennessee, US	
218	Win	93–17–18 (90)	Harold Smith	PTS	8	Dec 11, 1925	31 years, 136 days	Auditorium, Memphis, Tennessee, US	
217	Loss	92–17–18 (90)	Henry Lenard	NWS	10	Sep 7, 1925	31 years, 41 days	Oshkosh, Wisconsin, US	
216	Win	92–17–18 (89)	Harold Smith	NWS	10	Jul 17, 1925	30 years, 354 days	East Chicago, Indiana, US	
215	Loss	92–17–18 (88)	Pete Sarmiento	NWS	10	Jun 12, 1925	30 years, 319 days	Aurora Bowl, Aurora, Illinois, US	
214	Win	92–17–18 (87)	Leroy Dougan	PTS	8	May 26, 1925	30 years, 302 days	Blytheville, Arkansas, US	
213	Win	91–17–18 (87)	Bobby Hughes	PTS	8	May 25, 1925	30 years, 301 days	Memphis, Tennessee, US	
212	Loss	90–17–18 (87)	Johnny McCoy	PTS	12	Mar 9, 1925	30 years, 224 days	Fort Bliss Arena, El Paso, Texas, US	
211	Loss	90–16–18 (87)	Johnny McCoy	UD	12	Feb 23, 1925	30 years, 210 days	Fort Bliss Arena, El Paso, Texas, US	
210	Win	90–15–18 (87)	Tiger Jack Burns	PTS	10	Feb 4, 1925	30 years, 191 days	Dreamland Arena, San Diego, California, US	
209	Win	89–15–18 (87)	Jackie Sherman	PTS	10	Jan 24, 1925	30 years, 180 days	Lyceum A.C., Los Angeles, California, US	
208	Draw	88–15–18 (87)	Jimmy McLarnin	PTS	4	Dec 9, 1924	30 years, 134 days	Arena, Vernon, California, US	
207	Win	88–15–17 (87)	Pascal Colletti	PTS	8	Nov 17, 1924	30 years, 112 days	Memphis, Tennessee, US	
206	Win	87–15–17 (87)	Pascal Colletti	PTS	8	Mar 10, 1924	29 years, 226 days	Memphis, Tennessee, US	
205	Win	86–15–17 (87)	Bobby Hughes	NWS	10	Mar 5, 1924	29 years, 221 days	El Dorado, Arkansas, US	
204	Win	86–15–17 (86)	Johnny McCoy	PTS	8	Feb 18, 1924	29 years, 205 days	Southern A.C., Memphis, Tennessee, US	
203	Draw	85–15–17 (86)	Johnny McCoy	PTS	10	Dec 3, 1923	29 years, 128 days	Shreveport AC, Shreveport, Louisiana, US	
202	Win	85–15–16 (86)	Joe Lynch	NWS	10	Nov 27, 1923	29 years, 122 days	Coliseum, Saint Louis, Missouri, US	
201	Draw	85–15–16 (85)	Lewis Gaylor	PTS	12	Nov 19, 1923	29 years, 114 days	Church Street Auditorium, Hartford, Connecticut, US	
200	Win	85–15–15 (85)	Tommy Kid Murphy	NWS	10	Oct 1, 1923	29 years, 65 days	Arena, Trenton, New Jersey, US	
199	Win	85–15–15 (84)	Connie Curry	NWS	10	Apr 27, 1923	28 years, 273 days	Des Moines, Iowa, US	
198	Loss	85–15–15 (83)	Frankie Genaro	DQ	6 (10)	Apr 23, 1923	28 years, 269 days	Coliseum, Chicago, Illinois, US	
197	Win	85–14–15 (83)	Frankie Jerome	PTS	10	Mar 16, 1923	28 years, 231 days	Madison Square Garden, New York City, New York, US	
196	Draw	84–14–15 (83)	Charles 'Bud' Taylor	NWS	10	Feb 13, 1923	28 years, 200 days	Tomlinson Hall, Indianapolis, Indiana, US	
195	Win	84–14–15 (82)	Tommy Murray	PTS	10	Jan 26, 1923	28 years, 182 days	USS. Commodore, Lake Michigan, US	
194	Draw	83–14–15 (82)	Charles 'Bud' Taylor	NWS	10	Jan 15, 1923	28 years, 171 days	East Chicago, Indiana, US	
193	Win	83–14–15 (81)	Charles 'Bud' Taylor	NWS	10	Dec 22, 1922	28 years, 147 days	USS. Commodore, Lake Michigan, US	
192	Draw	83–14–15 (80)	Harold Smith	NWS	10	Nov 29, 1922	28 years, 124 days	Midway Arena, Chicago, Illinois, US	
191	Win	83–14–15 (79)	Frankie Jumatti	PTS	10	Nov 14, 1922	28 years, 109 days	Private club, Chicago, Illinois, US	
190	Loss	82–14–15 (79)	Joe Lynch	NWS	12	Sep 4, 1922	28 years, 38 days	Floyd Fitzsimmons' Arena, Michigan City, Indiana, US	
189	Loss	82–14–15 (78)	Eddie O'Dowd	PTS	12	Aug 14, 1922	28 years, 17 days	Columbus, Ohio, US	
188	Draw	82–13–15 (78)	Jack "Kid" Wolfe	PTS	12	Aug 7, 1922	28 years, 10 days	Velodrome, New York City, New York, US	
187	Draw	82–13–14 (78)	Sammy Mandell	NWS	8	Jul 4, 1922	27 years, 341 days	Russwood Park, Memphis, Tennessee, US	
186	Win	82–13–14 (77)	Charles 'Bud' Taylor	NWS	10	Jun 23, 1922	27 years, 330 days	Mullen-Sager Arena, Aurora, Illinois, US	
185	Win	82–13–14 (76)	Cowboy Eddie Anderson	NWS	10	Jun 6, 1922	27 years, 313 days	Coliseum, Davenport, Iowa, US	
184	Win	82–13–14 (75)	Dick Griffin	PTS	10	May 30, 1922	27 years, 306 days	Capital City Arena, Phoenix, Arizona, US	
183	Win	81–13–14 (75)	Babe Asher	PTS	12	May 26, 1922	27 years, 302 days	Stockyards Stadium, Denver, Colorado, US	
182	Win	80–13–14 (75)	Tim O'Dowd	PTS	10	May 15, 1922	27 years, 291 days	Ponce de Leon Ballpark, Atlanta, Georgia, US	
181	Win	79–13–14 (75)	Kid Pancho	PTS	8	May 1, 1922	27 years, 277 days	Memphis, Tennessee, US	
180	Loss	78–13–14 (75)	Cowboy Eddie Anderson	NWS	10	Apr 20, 1922	27 years, 266 days	Coliseum, Davenport, Iowa, US	
179	Win	78–13–14 (74)	Herbie Schaeffer	NWS	10	Mar 30, 1922	27 years, 245 days	Peoria, Illinois, US	
178	Win	78–13–14 (73)	Tommy Ryan	NWS	12	Mar 17, 1922	27 years, 232 days	Jefferson County Armory, Louisville, Kentucky, US	
177	Win	78–13–14 (72)	Frankie Jumatti	PTS	8	Mar 6, 1922	27 years, 221 days	Memphis, Tennessee, US	
176	Win	77–13–14 (72)	Earl McArthur	NWS	10	Jan 26, 1922	27 years, 182 days	Auditorium, Sioux City, Iowa, US	
175	Win	77–13–14 (71)	Young Jack Dempsey	NWS	8	Jan 12, 1922	27 years, 168 days	Jackson, Tennessee, US	
174	Win	77–13–14 (70)	Carl Tremaine	PTS	8	Jan 9, 1922	27 years, 165 days	Memphis, Tennessee, US	
173	Win	76–13–14 (70)	Joey Schwartz	NWS	10	Dec 19, 1921	27 years, 144 days	Danceland Arena, Detroit, Michigan, US	
172	Win	76–13–14 (69)	Johnny Buff	NWS	10	Dec 15, 1921	27 years, 140 days	Auditorium, Milwaukee, Wisconsin, US	
171	Loss	76–13–14 (68)	Johnny Kaiser	PTS	12	Nov 22, 1921	27 years, 117 days	Coliseum, Saint Louis, Missouri, US	
170	Win	76–12–14 (68)	Earl Puryear	PTS	10	Nov 4, 1921	27 years, 99 days	USS. Commodore, Lake Michigan, US	
169	Win	75–12–14 (68)	Frankie Jumatti	NWS	12	Oct 28, 1921	27 years, 92 days	City Auditorium, Houston, Texas, US	
168	Win	75–12–14 (67)	Frankie Garcia	PTS	8	Oct 10, 1921	27 years, 74 days	Memphis, Tennessee, US	
167	Win	74–12–14 (67)	Frankie Garcia	PTS	8	Oct 3, 1921	27 years, 67 days	Memphis, Tennessee, US	
166	Win	73–12–14 (67)	Midget Smith	NWS	10	Sep 23, 1921	27 years, 57 days	Sager's Arena, Aurora, Illinois, US	
165	Loss	73–12–14 (66)	Sammy Mandell	NWS	10	Aug 26, 1921	27 years, 29 days	Sager's Arena, Aurora, Illinois, US	
164	Loss	73–12–14 (65)	Frankie Monroe	NWS	4	Jun 1, 1921	26 years, 308 days	Pavilion, Seattle, Washington, US	
163	Loss	73–12–14 (64)	Billy Mascott	PTS	10	May 27, 1921	26 years, 303 days	Armory, Portland, Oregon, US	
162	Draw	73–11–14 (64)	Solly Epstein	NWS	10	May 20, 1921	26 years, 296 days	Terre Haute, Indiana, US	
161	Win	73–11–14 (63)	Joe Lynch	NWS	12	May 6, 1921	26 years, 282 days	Jefferson County Armory, Louisville, Kentucky, US	
160	Win	73–11–14 (62)	Jimmy Kelly	NWS	10	Apr 7, 1921	26 years, 253 days	Coliseum, Kenosha, Wisconsin, US	
159	Draw	73–11–14 (61)	Tommy Ryan	NWS	10	Mar 30, 1921	26 years, 245 days	Palisades Rink, McKeesport, Pennsylvania, US	
158	Win	73–11–14 (60)	Terry McHugh	NWS	10	Mar 28, 1921	26 years, 243 days	Allentown, Pennsylvania, US	
157	Win	73–11–14 (59)	Mickey Delmont	PTS	8	Mar 21, 1921	26 years, 236 days	Memphis, Tennessee, US	
156	Draw	72–11–14 (59)	Johnny Gannon	PTS	10	Mar 16, 1921	26 years, 231 days	Camp Grant arena, Rockford, Illinois, US	
155	Loss	72–11–13 (59)	Bobby Dyson	PTS	10	Mar 7, 1921	26 years, 222 days	New Bedford, Massachusetts, US	
154	Loss	72–10–13 (59)	Carl Tremaine	NWS	10	Feb 25, 1921	26 years, 212 days	Olympic Winter Garden, Cleveland, Ohio, US	
153	Win	72–10–13 (58)	Carl Tremaine	NWS	10	Feb 7, 1921	26 years, 194 days	Roller Palace Rink, Detroit, Michigan, US	
152	Win	72–10–13 (57)	Jimmy Kelly	NWS	10	Jan 31, 1921	26 years, 187 days	Sager's Arena, Aurora, Illinois, US	
151	Win	72–10–13 (56)	Young Montreal	UD	15	Jan 26, 1921	26 years, 182 days	Madison Square Garden, New York City, New York, US	
150	Win	71–10–13 (56)	Bobby Hughes	PTS	8	Dec 13, 1920	26 years, 138 days	Southern A.C., Memphis, Tennessee, US	
149	Loss	70–10–13 (56)	Dick Griffin	NWS	10	Dec 10, 1920	26 years, 135 days	Fort Worth, Texas, US	
148	Win	70–10–13 (55)	Dick Griffin	PTS	15	Nov 11, 1920	26 years, 106 days	Shreveport, Louisiana, US	
147	Win	69–10–13 (55)	Red Watson	PTS	8	Nov 1, 1920	26 years, 96 days	Southern A.C., Memphis, Tennessee, US	
146	Draw	68–10–13 (55)	Joe Lynch	NWS	8	Oct 26, 1920	26 years, 90 days	Coliseum, Saint Louis, Missouri, US	
145	Win	68–10–13 (54)	Earl Puryear	PTS	10	Oct 20, 1920	26 years, 84 days	Providence, Rhode Island, US	
144	Win	67–10–13 (54)	Johnny Ritchie	NWS	12	Oct 15, 1920	26 years, 79 days	Jefferson Theatre, Louisville, Kentucky, US	
143	Loss	67–10–13 (53)	Young Montreal	PTS	12	Sep 6, 1920	26 years, 40 days	Woonsocket, Rhode Island, US	
142	Win	67–9–13 (53)	Patsy Wallace	NWS	12	Jul 15, 1920	25 years, 353 days	Coliseum, Toledo, Ohio, US	
141	Loss	67–9–13 (52)	Carl Tremaine	NWS	12	Jun 16, 1920	25 years, 324 days	Coliseum, Toledo, Ohio, US	
140	Win	67–9–13 (51)	Jimmy Murphy	PTS	8	Jun 7, 1920	25 years, 315 days	Southern A.C., Memphis, Tennessee, US	
139	Win	66–9–13 (51)	Jabez White	NWS	12	May 31, 1920	25 years, 308 days	Portland, Maine, US	
138	Loss	66–9–13 (50)	Joe Lynch	NWS	12	May 24, 1920	25 years, 301 days	4th Regiment Armory, Jersey City, New Jersey, US	
137	Loss	66–9–13 (49)	Carl Tremaine	NWS	10	May 11, 1920	25 years, 288 days	Gray's Armory, Cleveland, Ohio, US	
136	Win	66–9–13 (48)	Jack "Kid" Wolfe	PTS	8	May 3, 1920	25 years, 280 days	Southern A.C., Memphis, Tennessee, US	
135	Win	65–9–13 (48)	Roy Moore	PTS	12	Apr 15, 1920	25 years, 262 days	Infantry Hall, Providence, Rhode Island, US	
134	Win	64–9–13 (48)	Frankie Daly	PTS	12	Apr 13, 1920	25 years, 260 days	Mechanics Building, Boston, Massachusetts, US	
133	Win	63–9–13 (48)	Harry Bramer	PTS	8	Apr 5, 1920	25 years, 252 days	Southern A.C., Memphis, Tennessee, US	
132	Win	62–9–13 (48)	Johnny Buff	NWS	8	Mar 19, 1920	25 years, 235 days	4th Regiment Armory, Jersey City, New Jersey, US	
131	Win	62–9–13 (47)	Jackie Sharkey	NWS	12	Feb 23, 1920	25 years, 210 days	Portland, Maine, US	
130	Draw	62–9–13 (46)	Earl Puryear	PTS	12	Feb 20, 1920	25 years, 207 days	Albaugh Theater, Baltimore, Maryland, US	
129	Loss	62–9–12 (46)	Roy Moore	PTS	12	Feb 6, 1920	25 years, 193 days	Albaugh Theater, Baltimore, Maryland, US	
128	Win	62–8–12 (46)	Eugène Criqui	TKO	14 (20)	Dec 26, 1919	25 years, 151 days	Royal Albert Hall, Kensington, London, England, U.K.	
127	Win	61–8–12 (46)	Jabez White	PTS	8	Nov 17, 1919	25 years, 112 days	Southern A.C., Memphis, Tennessee, US	
126	Loss	60–8–12 (46)	Mike Ertle	NWS	10	Nov 10, 1919	25 years, 105 days	Armory, Minneapolis, Minnesota, US	
125	Win	60–8–12 (45)	Bernie Hahn	PTS	8	Oct 21, 1919	25 years, 85 days	Southern A.C., Memphis, Tennessee, US	
124	Win	59–8–12 (45)	Jabez White	NWS	10	Oct 15, 1919	25 years, 79 days	Arena Gardens, Detroit, Michigan, US	
123	Loss	59–8–12 (44)	Jimmy Wilde	PTS	20	Jul 17, 1919	24 years, 354 days	Olympia, Kensington, London, England, U.K.	
122	Loss	59–7–12 (44)	Jackie Sharkey	NWS	10	Jun 4, 1919	24 years, 311 days	John Wagner's Arena, Racine, Wisconsin, US	
121	Win	59–7–12 (43)	Benny Chavez	PTS	8	May 24, 1919	24 years, 300 days	New Lyric Theater, Memphis, Tennessee, US	
120	Win	58–7–12 (43)	Sammy Sandow	NWS	8	Apr 14, 1919	24 years, 260 days	New Lyric Theater, Memphis, Tennessee, US	
119	Win	58–7–12 (42)	Pekin Kid Herman	NWS	10	Apr 10, 1919	24 years, 256 days	Lakeside Arena, Racine, Wisconsin, US	
118	Win	58–7–12 (41)	Willie Devore	NWS	12	Apr 1, 1919	24 years, 247 days	Akron, Ohio, US	
117	Win	58–7–12 (40)	Pete Herman	NWS	8	Mar 24, 1919	24 years, 239 days	New Lyric Theater, Memphis, Tennessee, US	
116	Win	58–7–12 (39)	Frankie Mason	PTS	10	Mar 11, 1919	24 years, 226 days	Oliver Theater, South Bend, Indiana, US	
115	Win	57–7–12 (39)	Patsy Scanlon	NWS	10	Mar 10, 1919	24 years, 225 days	Duquesne Garden, Pittsburgh, Pennsylvania, US	
114	Win	57–7–12 (38)	Kid Regan	NWS	8	Mar 4, 1919	24 years, 219 days	Coliseum, Saint Louis, Missouri, US	
113	Win	57–7–12 (37)	Johnny Ritchie	PTS	8	Feb 17, 1919	24 years, 204 days	New Lyric Theater, Memphis, Tennessee, US	
112	Win	56–7–12 (37)	Jim Walsh	PTS	8	Feb 14, 1919	24 years, 201 days	Orpheum Theater, Nashville, Tennessee, US	
111	Win	55–7–12 (37)	Earl Puryear	NWS	10	Feb 10, 1919	24 years, 197 days	Fairyland Rink, Peoria, Illinois, US	World bantamweight title claim at stake; (via KO only)
110	Win	55–7–12 (36)	Dick Loadman	NWS	10	Feb 3, 1919	24 years, 190 days	Broadway Auditorium, Buffalo, New York, US	
109	Win	55–7–12 (35)	Battling Harry Leonard	NWS	6	Feb 1, 1919	24 years, 188 days	National A.C., Philadelphia, Pennsylvania, US	
108	Win	55–7–12 (34)	Young McGovern	PTS	12	Jan 31, 1919	24 years, 187 days	Albaugh Theater, Baltimore, Maryland, US	Retained world bantamweight title claim
107	Win	54–7–12 (34)	Willie Devore	NWS	10	Sep 21, 1918	24 years, 55 days	Fairgounds, Elyria, Ohio, US	
106	Win	54–7–12 (33)	Jackie Sharkey	NWS	8	Aug 5, 1918	24 years, 8 days	Armory A.A., Jersey City, New Jersey, US	
105	Loss	54–7–12 (32)	Frankie Burns	NWS	8	Aug 2, 1918	24 years, 5 days	International League Ballpark, Jersey City, New Jersey, US	
104	Win	54–7–12 (31)	Earl Puryear	PTS	8	May 20, 1918	23 years, 296 days	Memphis, Tennessee, US	Retained world bantamweight title claim
103	Win	53–7–12 (31)	Eddie Wimler	PTS	12	May 6, 1918	23 years, 282 days	Lyric Theater, Baltimore, Maryland, US	
102	Win	52–7–12 (31)	Earl Puryear	PTS	8	Apr 29, 1918	23 years, 275 days	Phoenix A.C., Memphis, Tennessee, US	Retained world bantamweight title claim
101	Win	51–7–12 (31)	Johnny Ertle	PTS	15	Apr 10, 1918	23 years, 256 days	Lyric Theater, Baltimore, Maryland, US	Won world bantamweight title claim
100	Draw	50–7–12 (31)	Roy Moore	NWS	10	Mar 22, 1918	23 years, 237 days	Peoria, Illinois, US	
99	Win	50–7–12 (30)	Pekin Kid Herman	NWS	10	Feb 27, 1918	23 years, 214 days	Peoria, Illinois, US	
98	Loss	50–7–12 (29)	Mike Dundee	NWS	10	Feb 21, 1918	23 years, 208 days	Illinois Theater, Rock Island, Illinois, US	
97	Win	50–7–12 (28)	Jackie Sharkey	PTS	10	Feb 18, 1918	23 years, 205 days	Lyric Theater, Baltimore, Maryland, US	
96	Loss	49–7–12 (28)	Jabez White	NWS	10	Feb 13, 1918	23 years, 200 days	Eagles Club, Cleveland, Ohio, US	
95	Win	49–7–12 (27)	Dick Loadman	PTS	15	Feb 6, 1918	23 years, 193 days	Albaugh Theater, Baltimore, Maryland, US	
94	Loss	48–7–12 (27)	Roy Moore	NWS	10	Jan 31, 1918	23 years, 187 days	Empire Theatre, Rock Island, Illinois, US	
93	Win	48–7–12 (26)	Joe Lynch	PTS	12	Jan 11, 1918	23 years, 167 days	Rhode Island A.C., Providence, Rhode Island, US	
92	Win	47–7–12 (26)	Earl Puryear	NWS	15	Jan 1, 1918	23 years, 157 days	Crescent Hotel, Tulsa, Oklahoma, US	
91	Loss	47–7–12 (25)	Joe Lynch	PTS	12	Dec 21, 1917	23 years, 146 days	Rhode Island A.C., Thornton, Rhode Island, US	
90	Win	47–6–12 (25)	Artie Simons	PTS	15	Dec 10, 1917	23 years, 135 days	Orleans A.C., New Orleans, Louisiana, US	
89	Draw	46–6–12 (25)	Freddie Enck	NWS	10	Nov 23, 1917	23 years, 118 days	Aurora, Illinois, US	
88	Win	46–6–12 (24)	Johnny Ritchie	NWS	10	Nov 9, 1917	23 years, 104 days	Lakeside Arena, Racine, Wisconsin, US	
87	Win	46–6–12 (23)	Jackie Sharkey	NWS	10	Oct 30, 1917	23 years, 94 days	German Hall, Albany, New York, US	
86	Draw	46–6–12 (22)	Joe Lynch	NWS	10	Oct 27, 1917	23 years, 91 days	Fairmont A.C., New York City, New York, US	
85	Win	46–6–12 (21)	Jabez White	NWS	10	Oct 23, 1917	23 years, 87 days	German Hall, Albany, New York, US	
84	Loss	46–6–12 (20)	Jabez White	NWS	10	Sep 25, 1917	23 years, 59 days	German Hall, Albany, New York, US	
83	Win	46–6–12 (19)	Pekin Kid Herman	PTS	10	Sep 10, 1917	23 years, 44 days	La Salle, Illinois, US	
82	Win	45–6–12 (19)	Artie Simons	PTS	8	Sep 3, 1917	23 years, 37 days	Memphis, Tennessee, US	
81	Win	44–6–12 (19)	Jackie Sharkey	NWS	10	Aug 20, 1917	23 years, 23 days	Convention Hall, Saratoga, New York, US	
80	Win	44–6–12 (18)	Jimmy Murphy	PTS	8	Aug 13, 1917	23 years, 16 days	Memphis, Tennessee, US	
79	Draw	43–6–12 (18)	Frankie Burns	PTS	12	Jul 24, 1917	22 years, 361 days	Arena (Armory A.A.), Boston, Massachusetts, US	
78	Win	43–6–11 (18)	Roy Moore	PTS	8	Jul 16, 1917	22 years, 353 days	Memphis, Tennessee, US	
77	Win	42–6–11 (18)	Harry Kabakoff	TKO	6 (8)	Jul 4, 1917	22 years, 341 days	Memphis, Tennessee, US	
76	Win	41–6–11 (18)	Jack "Kid" Wolfe	PTS	8	Jun 18, 1917	22 years, 325 days	Memphis, Tennessee, US	
75	Loss	40–6–11 (18)	Jack "Kid" Wolfe	TKO	4 (10)	Feb 20, 1917	22 years, 207 days	Cleveland, Ohio, US	
74	Win	40–5–11 (18)	Artie Simons	PTS	8	Jan 29, 1917	22 years, 185 days	Memphis, Tennessee, US	
73	Win	39–5–11 (18)	Johnny Solzberg	NWS	10	Jan 5, 1917	22 years, 161 days	Harlem S.C., New York City, New York, US	
72	Loss	39–5–11 (17)	Frankie Burns	NWS	10	Jan 1, 1917	22 years, 157 days	German Hall, Albany, New York, US	
71	Loss	39–5–11 (16)	Frankie Burns	NWS	10	Dec 25, 1916	22 years, 150 days	Pioneer Sporting Club, New York City, New York, US	
70	Win	39–5–11 (15)	Billy Fitzsimmons	PTS	12	Nov 29, 1916	22 years, 124 days	Rhode Island A.C., Thornton, Rhode Island, US	
69	Win	38–5–11 (15)	Freddie Reese	NWS	10	Nov 27, 1916	22 years, 122 days	Military A.C., New York City, New York, US	
68	Win	38–5–11 (14)	Jackie Sharkey	NWS	10	Nov 25, 1916	22 years, 120 days	Fairmont A.C., New York City, New York, US	
67	Win	38–5–11 (13)	Willie Brown	PTS	12	Nov 22, 1916	22 years, 117 days	I. A. C., Thornton, Rhode Island, US	
66	Win	37–5–11 (13)	Battling Lahn	NWS	10	Nov 7, 1916	22 years, 102 days	Broadway Arena, New York City, New York, US	
65	Draw	37–5–11 (12)	Frankie Britt	PTS	12	Sep 19, 1916	22 years, 53 days	Armory, Boston, Massachusetts, US	
64	Win	37–5–10 (12)	Frankie Britt	PTS	12	Sep 5, 1916	22 years, 39 days	Armory, Boston, Massachusetts, US	
63	Win	36–5–10 (12)	Dutch Brandt	NWS	10	Sep 2, 1916	22 years, 36 days	Broadway Arena, New York City, New York, US	
62	Win	36–5–10 (11)	Young Zulu Kid	NWS	10	Aug 5, 1916	22 years, 8 days	Broadway Arena, New York City, New York, US	
61	Win	36–5–10 (10)	Kid Goodman	NWS	10	Jul 27, 1916	21 years, 365 days	Averne S.C., New York City, New York, US	
60	Win	36–5–10 (9)	Terry Martin	PTS	15	Jun 28, 1916	21 years, 336 days	National A.C., Providence, Rhode Island, US	
59	Loss	35–5–10 (9)	Freddie Bauman	NWS	15	May 23, 1916	21 years, 300 days	Tulsa, Oklahoma, US	
58	Win	35–5–10 (8)	Battling Reddy	PTS	12	May 17, 1916	21 years, 294 days	Rhode Island A.C., Thornton, Rhode Island, US	
57	Win	34–5–10 (8)	Terry Martin	PTS	12	May 10, 1916	21 years, 287 days	Rhode Island A.C., Thornton, Rhode Island, US	
56	Loss	33–5–10 (8)	Benny McCoy	NWS	10	May 1, 1916	21 years, 278 days	Pioneer Sporting Club, New York City, New York, US	
55	Loss	33–5–10 (7)	Al Shubert	PTS	12	Apr 17, 1916	21 years, 264 days	Elm Rink, New Bedford, Massachusetts, US	
54	Win	33–4–10 (7)	Mickey Dunn	NWS	10	Apr 14, 1916	21 years, 261 days	Harlem S.C., New York City, New York, US	
53	Draw	33–4–10 (6)	Benny McCoy	NWS	10	Apr 5, 1916	21 years, 252 days	Pioneer Sporting Club, New York City, New York, US	
52	Draw	33–4–10 (5)	Jimmy Pappas	PTS	10	Mar 14, 1916	21 years, 230 days	Casino Skating Rink, Atlanta, Georgia, US	
51	Win	33–4–9 (5)	Young Zulu Kid	PTS	8	Jan 13, 1916	21 years, 169 days	Memphis, Tennessee, US	
50	Win	32–4–9 (5)	Archie McLeod	NWS	8	Jan 4, 1916	21 years, 160 days	Future City A.C., Saint Louis, Missouri, US	
49	Win	32–4–9 (4)	Young Goldman	KO	1 (8)	Dec 22, 1915	21 years, 147 days	Chattanooga, Tennessee, US	
48	Win	31–4–9 (4)	Artie Armstrong	TKO	2 (8)	Dec 6, 1915	21 years, 131 days	Memphis, Tennessee, US	
47	Win	30–4–9 (4)	Battling Reddy	NWS	6	Nov 25, 1915	21 years, 120 days	National A.C., Philadelphia, Pennsylvania, US	
46	Win	30–4–9 (3)	Pete Herman	PTS	8	Nov 15, 1915	21 years, 110 days	Phoenix A.C., Memphis, Tennessee, US	
45	Win	29–4–9 (3)	Kid Williams	NWS	8	Oct 28, 1915	21 years, 92 days	Memphis, Tennessee, US	
44	Win	29–4–9 (2)	Jack Doyle	PTS	8	Oct 4, 1915	21 years, 68 days	Memphis, Tennessee, US	
43	Draw	28–4–9 (2)	Jack Doyle	PTS	8	Sep 20, 1915	21 years, 54 days	Memphis, Tennessee, US	
42	Loss	28–4–8 (2)	Sammy Sandow	PTS	8	Sep 6, 1915	21 years, 40 days	Memphis, Tennessee, US	
41	Win	28–3–8 (2)	Johnny Summers	KO	6 (10)	Jul 30, 1915	21 years, 2 days	Dauphine Theater, New Orleans, Louisiana, US	
40	Draw	27–3–8 (2)	Eddie Coulon	PTS	15	Jul 24, 1915	20 years, 361 days	Tulane Arena, New Orleans, Louisiana, US	
39	Win	27–3–7 (2)	Henry Koster	PTS	15	Jul 16, 1915	20 years, 353 days	Dauphine Theater, New Orleans, Louisiana, US	
38	Draw	26–3–7 (2)	Jack Doyle	PTS	15	Jul 9, 1915	20 years, 346 days	Dauphine Theater, New Orleans, Louisiana, US	
37	Win	26–3–6 (2)	Henry Koster	PTS	15	Jul 2, 1915	20 years, 339 days	Dauphine Theater, New Orleans, Louisiana, US	
36	Win	25–3–6 (2)	Bobby Burns	PTS	8	Jun 28, 1915	20 years, 335 days	Phoenix A.C., Memphis, Tennessee, US	
35	Draw	24–3–6 (2)	Bobby Burns	NWS	10	Jun 21, 1915	20 years, 328 days	Little Rock, Arkansas, US	
34	Draw	24–3–6 (1)	Nate Jackson	PTS	15	May 14, 1915	20 years, 290 days	Grand Opera House, Tulsa, Oklahoma, US	
33	Loss	24–3–5 (1)	Al Shubert	PTS	8	May 4, 1915	20 years, 280 days	Memphis, Tennessee, US	
32	Win	24–2–5 (1)	Jimmy Pappas	PTS	8	Apr 26, 1915	20 years, 272 days	Chattanooga, Tennessee, US	
31	Win	23–2–5 (1)	Nate Jackson	PTS	20	Apr 20, 1915	20 years, 266 days	Oklahoma City, Oklahoma, US	
30	Win	22–2–5 (1)	Lester Winters	PTS	8	Apr 13, 1915	20 years, 259 days	Nashville, Tennessee, US	
29	Win	21–2–5 (1)	Leslie Winters	PTS	8	Apr 12, 1915	20 years, 258 days	Orpheum Theater, Nashville, Tennessee, US	
28	Win	20–2–5 (1)	Johnny Ertle	PTS	8	Apr 5, 1915	20 years, 251 days	Phoenix A.C., Memphis, Tennessee, US	
27	Win	19–2–5 (1)	Young Zulu Kid	PTS	10	Mar 25, 1915	20 years, 240 days	Tommy Burns Arena, New Orleans, Louisiana, US	
26	Win	18–2–5 (1)	One Punch Hogan	PTS	10	Mar 22, 1915	20 years, 237 days	Orleans A.C., New Orleans, Louisiana, US	
25	Win	17–2–5 (1)	Jack Doyle	PTS	15	Mar 8, 1915	20 years, 223 days	Orleans A.C., New Orleans, Louisiana, US	
24	Draw	16–2–5 (1)	Jack Doyle	PTS	10	Mar 1, 1915	20 years, 216 days	Orleans A.C., New Orleans, Louisiana, US	
23	Win	16–2–4 (1)	Jack Doyle	PTS	10	Dec 30, 1914	20 years, 155 days	Orleans A.C., New Orleans, Louisiana, US	
22	Win	15–2–4 (1)	One Punch Hogan	PTS	8	Nov 23, 1914	20 years, 118 days	Memphis, Tennessee, US	
21	Draw	14–2–4 (1)	Nate Jackson	PTS	8	Nov 9, 1914	20 years, 104 days	Memphis, Tennessee, US	
20	Win	14–2–3 (1)	Red Dolan	PTS	8	Nov 2, 1914	20 years, 97 days	Memphis, Tennessee, US	
19	Draw	13–2–3 (1)	Nate Jackson	NWS	10	Oct 27, 1914	20 years, 91 days	Whittingham Park Theater, Hot Springs, Arkansas, US	
18	Loss	13–2–3	Eddie Coulon	PTS	8	Aug 31, 1914	20 years, 34 days	Memphis, Tennessee, US	
17	Win	13–1–3	Johnny Fisse	PTS	8	Aug 10, 1914	20 years, 13 days	Memphis, Tennessee, US	
16	Win	12–1–3	Tim Callahan	KO	4 (8)	Aug 3, 1914	20 years, 6 days	Memphis, Tennessee, US	
15	Win	11–1–3	Kid Russell	PTS	10	Jul 10, 1914	19 years, 347 days	Whitington Park, Hot Springs, Arkansas, US	
14	Draw	10–1–3	Nate Jackson	PTS	8	Jun 22, 1914	19 years, 329 days	Phoenix A.C., Memphis, Tennessee, US	
13	Win	10–1–2	Jimmy Pappas	PTS	8	May 25, 1914	19 years, 301 days	Phoenix A.C., Memphis, Tennessee, US	
12	Loss	9–1–2	Eddie Coulon	PTS	10	Apr 13, 1914	19 years, 259 days	Orleans A.C., New Orleans, Louisiana, US	
11	Draw	9–0–2	Jimmy Pappas	PTS	10	Apr 3, 1914	19 years, 249 days	Lyric Theater, New Orleans, Louisiana, US	
10	Draw	9–0–1	Johnny Eggers	PTS	8	Mar 27, 1914	19 years, 242 days	Matinee Hall, Chattanooga, Tennessee, US	
9	Win	9–0	Young Kid McCauley	KO	3 (8)	Feb 23, 1914	19 years, 210 days	Phoenix A.C., Memphis, Tennessee, US	
8	Win	8–0	Frankie Nurdin	PTS	10	Feb 10, 1914	19 years, 197 days	United States of America	Exact date and location unknown
7	Win	7–0	Johnny Keyes	PTS	8	Feb 2, 1914	19 years, 189 days	Phoenix A.C., Memphis, Tennessee, US	
6	Win	6–0	Shorty Anderson	PTS	8	Nov 17, 1913	19 years, 112 days	Phoenix A.C., Memphis, Tennessee, US	
5	Win	5–0	Eddie Buras	KO	1 (6)	Oct 13, 1913	19 years, 77 days	Phoenix A.C., Memphis, Tennessee, US	
4	Win	4–0	Young Battle	PTS	8	Jul 28, 1913	19 years, 0 days	Phoenix A.C., Memphis, Tennessee, US	
3	Win	3–0	Young Joe O'Hara	TKO	2 (6)	Jul 21, 1913	18 years, 358 days	Phoenix A.C., Memphis, Tennessee, US	
2	Win	2–0	Charley Wortham	TKO	4 (6)	Jul 4, 1913	18 years, 341 days	Phoenix A.C., Memphis, Tennessee, US	
1	Win	1–0	Young Heimann	TKO	2 (6)	May 19, 1913	18 years, 295 days	Phoenix A.C., Memphis, Tennessee, US	

=== Unofficial record ===
265 fights	170 wins	57 losses
By knockout	11	1
By decision	159	53
By disqualification	0	3
Draws	38	

Record with the inclusion of newspaper decisions in the win/loss/draw column.

No.	Result	Record	Opponent	Type	Round	Date	Age	Location	Notes
265	Win	170–57–38	Leroy Dougan	MD	8	Oct 6, 1930	36 years, 70 days	Ellis Auditorium, Memphis, Tennessee, US	
264	Win	169–57–38	Bobby Allen	PTS	8	Sep 9, 1930	36 years, 43 days	Congress Outdoor Stadium, Chicago, Illinois, US	
263	Win	168–57–38	Jackie Stewart	PTS	10	Aug 4, 1930	36 years, 7 days	Shewbridge Field, Chicago, Illinois, US	
262	Loss	167–57–38	Willie Pellegrini	PTS	8	Jul 8, 1930	35 years, 315 days	Congress Outdoor Stadium, Chicago, Illinois, US	
261	Win	167–56–38	Bobby Allen	PTS	10	May 14, 1930	35 years, 290 days	Ashland Blvd. Auditorium, Chicago, Illinois, US	
260	Win	166–56–38	Billy Knowles	PTS	6	Apr 17, 1930	35 years, 263 days	Viking Temple, Chicago, Illinois, US	
259	Win	165–56–38	Bobby Allen	PTS	10	Mar 31, 1930	35 years, 246 days	Ashland Blvd. Auditorium, Chicago, Illinois, US	
258	Win	164–56–38	Jackie Stewart	PTS	8	Dec 23, 1929	35 years, 148 days	Rainbo Arena, Chicago, Illinois, US	
257	Win	163–56–38	Willie Pellegrini	PTS	8	Dec 2, 1929	35 years, 127 days	Rainbo Arena, Chicago, Illinois, US	
256	Loss	162–56–38	Johnny Nasser	NWS	10	Oct 4, 1929	35 years, 68 days	Tomlinson Hall, Indianapolis, Indiana, US	
255	Loss	162–55–38	Leroy Dougan	NWS	10	Oct 23, 1928	34 years, 87 days	Jack Shelton Arena, San Antonio, Texas, US	
254	Draw	162–54–38	Quina Lee	PTS	12	Oct 16, 1928	34 years, 80 days	Fort Bliss Arena, El Paso, Texas, US	
253	Win	162–54–37	Kid Jap	NWS	10	Apr 16, 1928	33 years, 263 days	Fort Wayne, Indiana, US	
252	Win	161–54–37	Harry Forbes	NWS	10	Jan 27, 1928	33 years, 183 days	Fort Wayne, Indiana, US	
251	Loss	160–54–37	Petey Sarron	PTS	8	Oct 17, 1927	33 years, 81 days	Memphis Stadium, Memphis, Tennessee, US	
250	Loss	160–53–37	Leroy Dougan	UD	10	Sep 12, 1927	33 years, 46 days	American Legion Stadium, Little Rock, Arkansas, US	
249	Loss	160–52–37	Mickey Cohen	PTS	10	Aug 30, 1927	33 years, 33 days	Denver, Colorado, US	
248	Loss	160–51–37	Petey Sarron	NWS	10	Aug 1, 1927	33 years, 4 days	Birmingham A.C., Birmingham, Alabama, US	
247	Draw	160–50–37	Eddie Wolfe	PTS	8	Jul 25, 1927	32 years, 362 days	Memphis Stadium, Memphis, Tennessee, US	
246	Loss	160–50–36	Fidel LaBarba	PTS	10	Jul 12, 1927	32 years, 349 days	Wrigley Field, Chicago, Illinois, US	
245	Loss	160–49–36	Charles 'Bud' Taylor	NWS	8	May 9, 1927	32 years, 285 days	Memphis Stadium, Memphis, Tennessee, US	
244	Loss	160–48–36	Pinky May	PTS	10	Apr 22, 1927	32 years, 268 days	Savannah, Georgia, US	
243	Draw	160–47–36	Johnny Franks	PTS	8	Apr 18, 1927	32 years, 264 days	Southern A.C., Memphis, Tennessee, US	
242	Win	160–47–35	Kid Jap	PTS	10	Mar 1, 1927	32 years, 216 days	Coliseum, Chicago, Illinois, US	
241	Loss	159–47–35	Tommy Milton	PTS	10	Feb 17, 1927	32 years, 204 days	Sokol Hall, Chicago, Illinois, US	
240	Win	159–46–35	Kid Jap	NWS	10	Feb 11, 1927	32 years, 198 days	Cedar Rapids, Iowa, US	
239	Draw	158–46–35	Johnny Franks	PTS	8	Jan 31, 1927	32 years, 187 days	Memphis Stadium, Memphis, Tennessee, US	
238	Loss	158–46–34	Johnny Franks	DQ	3 (8)	Jan 17, 1927	32 years, 173 days	Memphis Stadium, Memphis, Tennessee, US	
237	Draw	158–45–34	Leroy Dougan	PTS	8	Jan 10, 1927	32 years, 166 days	Memphis Stadium, Memphis, Tennessee, US	
236	Loss	158–45–33	Midget Mike O'Dowd	NWS	12	Dec 27, 1926	32 years, 152 days	Broadway Arena, Louisville, Kentucky, US	
235	Win	158–44–33	Midget Mike Moran	NWS	12	Dec 20, 1926	32 years, 145 days	Jefferson County Armory, Louisville, Kentucky, US	
234	Win	157–44–33	Midget Mike O'Dowd	PTS	8	Nov 29, 1926	32 years, 124 days	Southern A.C., Memphis, Tennessee, US	
233	Win	156–44–33	Dick Griffin	PTS	10	Nov 17, 1926	32 years, 112 days	Dallas, Texas, US	
232	Loss	155–44–33	Young Nationalista	PTS	10	Aug 31, 1926	32 years, 34 days	Coliseum, Chicago, Illinois, US	
231	Win	155–43–33	Mickey Satnick	NWS	10	Aug 21, 1926	32 years, 24 days	Fairgrounds Coliseum, Indianapolis, Indiana, US	
230	Loss	154–43–33	Jimmy Russo	DQ	9 (10)	Aug 12, 1926	32 years, 15 days	Rockford, Illinois, US	
229	Win	154–42–33	Tiger Jack Burns	PTS	10	Jul 26, 1926	31 years, 333 days	White City Arena, Chicago, Illinois, US	
228	Draw	153–42–33	Davey Atler	PTS	10	Jun 11, 1926	31 years, 318 days	Sioux Falls, South Dakota, US	
227	Win	153–42–32	Kid Lencho	NWS	12	Jun 1, 1926	31 years, 308 days	Block Stadium, San Antonio, Texas, US	
226	Win	152–42–32	Earl McArthur	PTS	10	May 18, 1926	31 years, 294 days	Sioux Falls, South Dakota, US	
225	Loss	151–42–32	Happy Atherton	NWS	10	Apr 19, 1926	31 years, 265 days	Tomlinson Hall, Indianapolis, Indiana, US	
224	Win	151–41–32	Bobby Hughes	PTS	10	Mar 29, 1926	31 years, 244 days	Hot Springs, Arkansas, US	
223	Win	150–41–32	Joe Lynch	NWS	10	Mar 4, 1926	31 years, 219 days	Miami Field, Miami, Florida, US	
222	Draw	149–41–32	Joe Lynch	PTS	10	Feb 24, 1926	31 years, 211 days	Municipal Ball Park, Fort Lauderdale, Florida, US	
221	Loss	149–41–31	Henry Lenard	NWS	10	Jan 22, 1926	31 years, 178 days	Coliseum, Davenport, Iowa, US	
220	Win	149–40–31	Louis Andrews	NWS	8	Dec 17, 1925	31 years, 142 days	Clarksdale, Tennessee, US	
219	Loss	148–40–31	Leroy Dougan	PTS	8	Dec 15, 1925	31 years, 140 days	Blytheville, Tennessee, US	
218	Win	148–39–31	Harold Smith	PTS	8	Dec 11, 1925	31 years, 136 days	Auditorium, Memphis, Tennessee, US	
217	Loss	147–39–31	Henry Lenard	NWS	10	Sep 7, 1925	31 years, 41 days	Oshkosh, Wisconsin, US	
216	Win	147–38–31	Harold Smith	NWS	10	Jul 17, 1925	30 years, 354 days	East Chicago, Indiana, US	
215	Loss	146–38–31	Pete Sarmiento	NWS	10	Jun 12, 1925	30 years, 319 days	Aurora Bowl, Aurora, Illinois, US	
214	Win	146–37–31	Leroy Dougan	PTS	8	May 26, 1925	30 years, 302 days	Blytheville, Arkansas, US	
213	Win	145–37–31	Bobby Hughes	PTS	8	May 25, 1925	30 years, 301 days	Memphis, Tennessee, US	
212	Loss	144–37–31	Johnny McCoy	PTS	12	Mar 9, 1925	30 years, 224 days	Fort Bliss Arena, El Paso, Texas, US	
211	Loss	144–36–31	Johnny McCoy	UD	12	Feb 23, 1925	30 years, 210 days	Fort Bliss Arena, El Paso, Texas, US	
210	Win	144–35–31	Tiger Jack Burns	PTS	10	Feb 4, 1925	30 years, 191 days	Dreamland Arena, San Diego, California, US	
209	Win	143–35–31	Jackie Sherman	PTS	10	Jan 24, 1925	30 years, 180 days	Lyceum A.C., Los Angeles, California, US	
208	Draw	142–35–31	Jimmy McLarnin	PTS	4	Dec 9, 1924	30 years, 134 days	Arena, Vernon, California, US	
207	Win	142–35–30	Pascal Colletti	PTS	8	Nov 17, 1924	30 years, 112 days	Memphis, Tennessee, US	
206	Win	141–35–30	Pascal Colletti	PTS	8	Mar 10, 1924	29 years, 226 days	Memphis, Tennessee, US	
205	Win	140–35–30	Bobby Hughes	NWS	10	Mar 5, 1924	29 years, 221 days	El Dorado, Arkansas, US	
204	Win	139–35–30	Johnny McCoy	PTS	8	Feb 18, 1924	29 years, 205 days	Southern A.C., Memphis, Tennessee, US	
203	Draw	138–35–30	Johnny McCoy	PTS	10	Dec 3, 1923	29 years, 128 days	Shreveport AC, Shreveport, Louisiana, US	
202	Win	138–35–29	Joe Lynch	NWS	10	Nov 27, 1923	29 years, 122 days	Coliseum, Saint Louis, Missouri, US	
201	Draw	137–35–29	Lewis Gaylor	PTS	12	Nov 19, 1923	29 years, 114 days	Church Street Auditorium, Hartford, Connecticut, US	
200	Win	137–35–28	Tommy Kid Murphy	NWS	10	Oct 1, 1923	29 years, 65 days	Arena, Trenton, New Jersey, US	
199	Win	136–35–28	Connie Curry	NWS	10	Apr 27, 1923	28 years, 273 days	Des Moines, Iowa, US	
198	Loss	135–35–28	Frankie Genaro	DQ	6 (10)	Apr 23, 1923	28 years, 269 days	Coliseum, Chicago, Illinois, US	
197	Win	135–34–28	Frankie Jerome	PTS	10	Mar 16, 1923	28 years, 231 days	Madison Square Garden, New York City, New York, US	
196	Draw	134–34–28	Charles 'Bud' Taylor	NWS	10	Feb 13, 1923	28 years, 200 days	Tomlinson Hall, Indianapolis, Indiana, US	
195	Win	134–34–27	Tommy Murray	PTS	10	Jan 26, 1923	28 years, 182 days	USS. Commodore, Lake Michigan, US	
194	Draw	133–34–27	Charles 'Bud' Taylor	NWS	10	Jan 15, 1923	28 years, 171 days	East Chicago, Indiana, US	
193	Win	133–34–26	Charles 'Bud' Taylor	NWS	10	Dec 22, 1922	28 years, 147 days	USS. Commodore, Lake Michigan, US	
192	Draw	132–34–26	Harold Smith	NWS	10	Nov 29, 1922	28 years, 124 days	Midway Arena, Chicago, Illinois, US	
191	Win	132–34–25	Frankie Jumatti	PTS	10	Nov 14, 1922	28 years, 109 days	Private club, Chicago, Illinois, US	
190	Loss	131–34–25	Joe Lynch	NWS	12	Sep 4, 1922	28 years, 38 days	Floyd Fitzsimmons' Arena, Michigan City, Indiana, US	
189	Loss	131–33–25	Eddie O'Dowd	PTS	12	Aug 14, 1922	28 years, 17 days	Columbus, Ohio, US	
188	Draw	131–32–25	Jack "Kid" Wolfe	PTS	12	Aug 7, 1922	28 years, 10 days	Velodrome, New York City, New York, US	
187	Draw	131–32–24	Sammy Mandell	NWS	8	Jul 4, 1922	27 years, 341 days	Russwood Park, Memphis, Tennessee, US	
186	Win	131–32–23	Charles 'Bud' Taylor	NWS	10	Jun 23, 1922	27 years, 330 days	Mullen-Sager Arena, Aurora, Illinois, US	
185	Win	130–32–23	Cowboy Eddie Anderson	NWS	10	Jun 6, 1922	27 years, 313 days	Coliseum, Davenport, Iowa, US	
184	Win	129–32–23	Dick Griffin	PTS	10	May 30, 1922	27 years, 306 days	Capital City Arena, Phoenix, Arizona, US	
183	Win	128–32–23	Babe Asher	PTS	12	May 26, 1922	27 years, 302 days	Stockyards Stadium, Denver, Colorado, US	
182	Win	127–32–23	Tim O'Dowd	PTS	10	May 15, 1922	27 years, 291 days	Ponce de Leon Ballpark, Atlanta, Georgia, US	
181	Win	126–32–23	Kid Pancho	PTS	8	May 1, 1922	27 years, 277 days	Memphis, Tennessee, US	
180	Loss	125–32–23	Cowboy Eddie Anderson	NWS	10	Apr 20, 1922	27 years, 266 days	Coliseum, Davenport, Iowa, US	
179	Win	125–31–23	Herbie Schaeffer	NWS	10	Mar 30, 1922	27 years, 245 days	Peoria, Illinois, US	
178	Win	124–31–23	Tommy Ryan	NWS	12	Mar 17, 1922	27 years, 232 days	Jefferson County Armory, Louisville, Kentucky, US	
177	Win	123–31–23	Frankie Jumatti	PTS	8	Mar 6, 1922	27 years, 221 days	Memphis, Tennessee, US	
176	Win	122–31–23	Earl McArthur	NWS	10	Jan 26, 1922	27 years, 182 days	Auditorium, Sioux City, Iowa, US	
175	Win	121–31–23	Young Jack Dempsey	NWS	8	Jan 12, 1922	27 years, 168 days	Jackson, Tennessee, US	
174	Win	120–31–23	Carl Tremaine	PTS	8	Jan 9, 1922	27 years, 165 days	Memphis, Tennessee, US	
173	Win	119–31–23	Joey Schwartz	NWS	10	Dec 19, 1921	27 years, 144 days	Danceland Arena, Detroit, Michigan, US	
172	Win	118–31–23	Johnny Buff	NWS	10	Dec 15, 1921	27 years, 140 days	Auditorium, Milwaukee, Wisconsin, US	
171	Loss	117–31–23	Johnny Kaiser	PTS	12	Nov 22, 1921	27 years, 117 days	Coliseum, Saint Louis, Missouri, US	
170	Win	117–30–23	Earl Puryear	PTS	10	Nov 4, 1921	27 years, 99 days	USS. Commodore, Lake Michigan, US	
169	Win	116–30–23	Frankie Jumatti	NWS	12	Oct 28, 1921	27 years, 92 days	City Auditorium, Houston, Texas, US	
168	Win	115–30–23	Frankie Garcia	PTS	8	Oct 10, 1921	27 years, 74 days	Memphis, Tennessee, US	
167	Win	114–30–23	Frankie Garcia	PTS	8	Oct 3, 1921	27 years, 67 days	Memphis, Tennessee, US	
166	Win	113–30–23	Midget Smith	NWS	10	Sep 23, 1921	27 years, 57 days	Sager's Arena, Aurora, Illinois, US	
165	Loss	112–30–23	Sammy Mandell	NWS	10	Aug 26, 1921	27 years, 29 days	Sager's Arena, Aurora, Illinois, US	
164	Loss	112–29–23	Frankie Monroe	NWS	4	Jun 1, 1921	26 years, 308 days	Pavilion, Seattle, Washington, US	
163	Loss	112–28–23	Billy Mascott	PTS	10	May 27, 1921	26 years, 303 days	Armory, Portland, Oregon, US	
162	Draw	112–27–23	Solly Epstein	NWS	10	May 20, 1921	26 years, 296 days	Terre Haute, Indiana, US	
161	Win	112–27–22	Joe Lynch	NWS	12	May 6, 1921	26 years, 282 days	Jefferson County Armory, Louisville, Kentucky, US	
160	Win	111–27–22	Jimmy Kelly	NWS	10	Apr 7, 1921	26 years, 253 days	Coliseum, Kenosha, Wisconsin, US	
159	Draw	110–27–22	Tommy Ryan	NWS	10	Mar 30, 1921	26 years, 245 days	Palisades Rink, McKeesport, Pennsylvania, US	
158	Win	110–27–21	Terry McHugh	NWS	10	Mar 28, 1921	26 years, 243 days	Allentown, Pennsylvania, US	
157	Win	109–27–21	Mickey Delmont	PTS	8	Mar 21, 1921	26 years, 236 days	Memphis, Tennessee, US	
156	Draw	108–27–21	Johnny Gannon	PTS	10	Mar 16, 1921	26 years, 231 days	Camp Grant arena, Rockford, Illinois, US	
155	Loss	108–27–20	Bobby Dyson	PTS	10	Mar 7, 1921	26 years, 222 days	New Bedford, Massachusetts, US	
154	Loss	108–26–20	Carl Tremaine	NWS	10	Feb 25, 1921	26 years, 212 days	Olympic Winter Garden, Cleveland, Ohio, US	
153	Win	108–25–20	Carl Tremaine	NWS	10	Feb 7, 1921	26 years, 194 days	Roller Palace Rink, Detroit, Michigan, US	
152	Win	107–25–20	Jimmy Kelly	NWS	10	Jan 31, 1921	26 years, 187 days	Sager's Arena, Aurora, Illinois, US	
151	Win	106–25–20	Young Montreal	UD	15	Jan 26, 1921	26 years, 182 days	Madison Square Garden, New York City, New York, US	
150	Win	105–25–20	Bobby Hughes	PTS	8	Dec 13, 1920	26 years, 138 days	Southern A.C., Memphis, Tennessee, US	
149	Loss	104–25–20	Dick Griffin	NWS	10	Dec 10, 1920	26 years, 135 days	Fort Worth, Texas, US	
148	Win	104–24–20	Dick Griffin	PTS	15	Nov 11, 1920	26 years, 106 days	Shreveport, Louisiana, US	
147	Win	103–24–20	Red Watson	PTS	8	Nov 1, 1920	26 years, 96 days	Southern A.C., Memphis, Tennessee, US	
146	Draw	102–24–20	Joe Lynch	NWS	8	Oct 26, 1920	26 years, 90 days	Coliseum, Saint Louis, Missouri, US	
145	Win	102–24–19	Earl Puryear	PTS	10	Oct 20, 1920	26 years, 84 days	Providence, Rhode Island, US	
144	Win	101–24–19	Johnny Ritchie	NWS	12	Oct 15, 1920	26 years, 79 days	Jefferson Theatre, Louisville, Kentucky, US	
143	Loss	100–24–19	Young Montreal	PTS	12	Sep 6, 1920	26 years, 40 days	Woonsocket, Rhode Island, US	
142	Win	100–23–19	Patsy Wallace	NWS	12	Jul 15, 1920	25 years, 353 days	Coliseum, Toledo, Ohio, US	
141	Loss	99–23–19	Carl Tremaine	NWS	12	Jun 16, 1920	25 years, 324 days	Coliseum, Toledo, Ohio, US	
140	Win	99–22–19	Jimmy Murphy	PTS	8	Jun 7, 1920	25 years, 315 days	Southern A.C., Memphis, Tennessee, US	
139	Win	98–22–19	Jabez White	NWS	12	May 31, 1920	25 years, 308 days	Portland, Maine, US	
138	Loss	97–22–19	Joe Lynch	NWS	12	May 24, 1920	25 years, 301 days	4th Regiment Armory, Jersey City, New Jersey, US	
137	Loss	97–21–19	Carl Tremaine	NWS	10	May 11, 1920	25 years, 288 days	Gray's Armory, Cleveland, Ohio, US	
136	Win	97–20–19	Jack "Kid" Wolfe	PTS	8	May 3, 1920	25 years, 280 days	Southern A.C., Memphis, Tennessee, US	
135	Win	96–20–19	Roy Moore	PTS	12	Apr 15, 1920	25 years, 262 days	Infantry Hall, Providence, Rhode Island, US	
134	Win	95–20–19	Frankie Daly	PTS	12	Apr 13, 1920	25 years, 260 days	Mechanics Building, Boston, Massachusetts, US	
133	Win	94–20–19	Harry Bramer	PTS	8	Apr 5, 1920	25 years, 252 days	Southern A.C., Memphis, Tennessee, US	
132	Win	93–20–19	Johnny Buff	NWS	8	Mar 19, 1920	25 years, 235 days	4th Regiment Armory, Jersey City, New Jersey, US	
131	Win	92–20–19	Jackie Sharkey	NWS	12	Feb 23, 1920	25 years, 210 days	Portland, Maine, US	
130	Draw	91–20–19	Earl Puryear	PTS	12	Feb 20, 1920	25 years, 207 days	Albaugh Theater, Baltimore, Maryland, US	
129	Loss	91–20–18	Roy Moore	PTS	12	Feb 6, 1920	25 years, 193 days	Albaugh Theater, Baltimore, Maryland, US	
128	Win	91–19–18	Eugène Criqui	TKO	14 (20)	Dec 26, 1919	25 years, 151 days	Royal Albert Hall, Kensington, London, England, U.K.	
127	Win	90–19–18	Jabez White	PTS	8	Nov 17, 1919	25 years, 112 days	Southern A.C., Memphis, Tennessee, US	
126	Loss	89–19–18	Mike Ertle	NWS	10	Nov 10, 1919	25 years, 105 days	Armory, Minneapolis, Minnesota, US	
125	Win	89–18–18	Bernie Hahn	PTS	8	Oct 21, 1919	25 years, 85 days	Southern A.C., Memphis, Tennessee, US	
124	Win	88–18–18	Jabez White	NWS	10	Oct 15, 1919	25 years, 79 days	Arena Gardens, Detroit, Michigan, US	
123	Loss	87–18–18	Jimmy Wilde	PTS	20	Jul 17, 1919	24 years, 354 days	Olympia, Kensington, London, England, U.K.	
122	Loss	87–17–18	Jackie Sharkey	NWS	10	Jun 4, 1919	24 years, 311 days	John Wagner's Arena, Racine, Wisconsin, US	
121	Win	87–16–18	Benny Chavez	PTS	8	May 24, 1919	24 years, 300 days	New Lyric Theater, Memphis, Tennessee, US	
120	Win	86–16–18	Sammy Sandow	NWS	8	Apr 14, 1919	24 years, 260 days	New Lyric Theater, Memphis, Tennessee, US	
119	Win	85–16–18	Pekin Kid Herman	NWS	10	Apr 10, 1919	24 years, 256 days	Lakeside Arena, Racine, Wisconsin, US	
118	Win	84–16–18	Willie Devore	NWS	12	Apr 1, 1919	24 years, 247 days	Akron, Ohio, US	
117	Win	83–16–18	Pete Herman	NWS	8	Mar 24, 1919	24 years, 239 days	New Lyric Theater, Memphis, Tennessee, US	
116	Win	82–16–18	Frankie Mason	PTS	10	Mar 11, 1919	24 years, 226 days	Oliver Theater, South Bend, Indiana, US	
115	Win	81–16–18	Patsy Scanlon	NWS	10	Mar 10, 1919	24 years, 225 days	Duquesne Garden, Pittsburgh, Pennsylvania, US	
114	Win	80–16–18	Kid Regan	NWS	8	Mar 4, 1919	24 years, 219 days	Coliseum, Saint Louis, Missouri, US	
113	Win	79–16–18	Johnny Ritchie	PTS	8	Feb 17, 1919	24 years, 204 days	New Lyric Theater, Memphis, Tennessee, US	
112	Win	78–16–18	Jim Walsh	PTS	8	Feb 14, 1919	24 years, 201 days	Orpheum Theater, Nashville, Tennessee, US	
111	Win	77–16–18	Earl Puryear	NWS	10	Feb 10, 1919	24 years, 197 days	Fairyland Rink, Peoria, Illinois, US	World bantamweight title claim at stake; (via KO only)
110	Win	76–16–18	Dick Loadman	NWS	10	Feb 3, 1919	24 years, 190 days	Broadway Auditorium, Buffalo, New York, US	
109	Win	75–16–18	Battling Harry Leonard	NWS	6	Feb 1, 1919	24 years, 188 days	National A.C., Philadelphia, Pennsylvania, US	
108	Win	74–16–18	Young McGovern	PTS	12	Jan 31, 1919	24 years, 187 days	Albaugh Theater, Baltimore, Maryland, US	Retained world bantamweight title claim
107	Win	73–16–18	Willie Devore	NWS	10	Sep 21, 1918	24 years, 55 days	Fairgounds, Elyria, Ohio, US	
106	Win	72–16–18	Jackie Sharkey	NWS	8	Aug 5, 1918	24 years, 8 days	Armory A.A., Jersey City, New Jersey, US	
105	Loss	71–16–18	Frankie Burns	NWS	8	Aug 2, 1918	24 years, 5 days	International League Ballpark, Jersey City, New Jersey, US	
104	Win	71–15–18	Earl Puryear	PTS	8	May 20, 1918	23 years, 296 days	Memphis, Tennessee, US	Retained world bantamweight title claim
103	Win	70–15–18	Eddie Wimler	PTS	12	May 6, 1918	23 years, 282 days	Lyric Theater, Baltimore, Maryland, US	
102	Win	69–15–18	Earl Puryear	PTS	8	Apr 29, 1918	23 years, 275 days	Phoenix A.C., Memphis, Tennessee, US	Retained world bantamweight title claim
101	Win	68–15–18	Johnny Ertle	PTS	15	Apr 10, 1918	23 years, 256 days	Lyric Theater, Baltimore, Maryland, US	Won world bantamweight title claim
100	Draw	67–15–18	Roy Moore	NWS	10	Mar 22, 1918	23 years, 237 days	Peoria, Illinois, US	
99	Win	67–15–17	Pekin Kid Herman	NWS	10	Feb 27, 1918	23 years, 214 days	Peoria, Illinois, US	
98	Loss	66–15–17	Mike Dundee	NWS	10	Feb 21, 1918	23 years, 208 days	Illinois Theater, Rock Island, Illinois, US	
97	Win	66–14–17	Jackie Sharkey	PTS	10	Feb 18, 1918	23 years, 205 days	Lyric Theater, Baltimore, Maryland, US	
96	Loss	65–14–17	Jabez White	NWS	10	Feb 13, 1918	23 years, 200 days	Eagles Club, Cleveland, Ohio, US	
95	Win	65–13–17	Dick Loadman	PTS	15	Feb 6, 1918	23 years, 193 days	Albaugh Theater, Baltimore, Maryland, US	
94	Loss	64–13–17	Roy Moore	NWS	10	Jan 31, 1918	23 years, 187 days	Empire Theatre, Rock Island, Illinois, US	
93	Win	64–12–17	Joe Lynch	PTS	12	Jan 11, 1918	23 years, 167 days	Rhode Island A.C., Providence, Rhode Island, US	
92	Win	63–12–17	Earl Puryear	NWS	15	Jan 1, 1918	23 years, 157 days	Crescent Hotel, Tulsa, Oklahoma, US	
91	Loss	62–12–17	Joe Lynch	PTS	12	Dec 21, 1917	23 years, 146 days	Rhode Island A.C., Thornton, Rhode Island, US	
90	Win	62–11–17	Artie Simons	PTS	15	Dec 10, 1917	23 years, 135 days	Orleans A.C., New Orleans, Louisiana, US	
89	Draw	61–11–17	Freddie Enck	NWS	10	Nov 23, 1917	23 years, 118 days	Aurora, Illinois, US	
88	Win	61–11–16	Johnny Ritchie	NWS	10	Nov 9, 1917	23 years, 104 days	Lakeside Arena, Racine, Wisconsin, US	
87	Win	60–11–16	Jackie Sharkey	NWS	10	Oct 30, 1917	23 years, 94 days	German Hall, Albany, New York, US	
86	Draw	59–11–16	Joe Lynch	NWS	10	Oct 27, 1917	23 years, 91 days	Fairmont A.C., New York City, New York, US	
85	Win	59–11–15	Jabez White	NWS	10	Oct 23, 1917	23 years, 87 days	German Hall, Albany, New York, US	
84	Loss	58–11–15	Jabez White	NWS	10	Sep 25, 1917	23 years, 59 days	German Hall, Albany, New York, US	
83	Win	58–10–15	Pekin Kid Herman	PTS	10	Sep 10, 1917	23 years, 44 days	La Salle, Illinois, US	
82	Win	57–10–15	Artie Simons	PTS	8	Sep 3, 1917	23 years, 37 days	Memphis, Tennessee, US	
81	Win	56–10–15	Jackie Sharkey	NWS	10	Aug 20, 1917	23 years, 23 days	Convention Hall, Saratoga, New York, US	
80	Win	55–10–15	Jimmy Murphy	PTS	8	Aug 13, 1917	23 years, 16 days	Memphis, Tennessee, US	
79	Draw	54–10–15	Frankie Burns	PTS	12	Jul 24, 1917	22 years, 361 days	Arena (Armory A.A.), Boston, Massachusetts, US	
78	Win	54–10–14	Roy Moore	PTS	8	Jul 16, 1917	22 years, 353 days	Memphis, Tennessee, US	
77	Win	53–10–14	Harry Kabakoff	TKO	6 (8)	Jul 4, 1917	22 years, 341 days	Memphis, Tennessee, US	
76	Win	52–10–14	Jack "Kid" Wolfe	PTS	8	Jun 18, 1917	22 years, 325 days	Memphis, Tennessee, US	
75	Loss	51–10–14	Jack "Kid" Wolfe	TKO	4 (10)	Feb 20, 1917	22 years, 207 days	Cleveland, Ohio, US	
74	Win	51–9–14	Artie Simons	PTS	8	Jan 29, 1917	22 years, 185 days	Memphis, Tennessee, US	
73	Win	50–9–14	Johnny Solzberg	NWS	10	Jan 5, 1917	22 years, 161 days	Harlem S.C., New York City, New York, US	
72	Loss	49–9–14	Frankie Burns	NWS	10	Jan 1, 1917	22 years, 157 days	German Hall, Albany, New York, US	
71	Loss	49–8–14	Frankie Burns	NWS	10	Dec 25, 1916	22 years, 150 days	Pioneer Sporting Club, New York City, New York, US	
70	Win	49–7–14	Billy Fitzsimmons	PTS	12	Nov 29, 1916	22 years, 124 days	Rhode Island A.C., Thornton, Rhode Island, US	
69	Win	48–7–14	Freddie Reese	NWS	10	Nov 27, 1916	22 years, 122 days	Military A.C., New York City, New York, US	
68	Win	47–7–14	Jackie Sharkey	NWS	10	Nov 25, 1916	22 years, 120 days	Fairmont A.C., New York City, New York, US	
67	Win	46–7–14	Willie Brown	PTS	12	Nov 22, 1916	22 years, 117 days	I. A. C., Thornton, Rhode Island, US	
66	Win	45–7–14	Battling Lahn	NWS	10	Nov 7, 1916	22 years, 102 days	Broadway Arena, New York City, New York, US	
65	Draw	44–7–14	Frankie Britt	PTS	12	Sep 19, 1916	22 years, 53 days	Armory, Boston, Massachusetts, US	
64	Win	44–7–13	Frankie Britt	PTS	12	Sep 5, 1916	22 years, 39 days	Armory, Boston, Massachusetts, US	
63	Win	43–7–13	Dutch Brandt	NWS	10	Sep 2, 1916	22 years, 36 days	Broadway Arena, New York City, New York, US	
62	Win	42–7–13	Young Zulu Kid	NWS	10	Aug 5, 1916	22 years, 8 days	Broadway Arena, New York City, New York, US	
61	Win	41–7–13	Kid Goodman	NWS	10	Jul 27, 1916	21 years, 365 days	Averne S.C., New York City, New York, US	
60	Win	40–7–13	Terry Martin	PTS	15	Jun 28, 1916	21 years, 336 days	National A.C., Providence, Rhode Island, US	
59	Loss	39–7–13	Freddie Bauman	NWS	15	May 23, 1916	21 years, 300 days	Tulsa, Oklahoma, US	
58	Win	39–6–13	Battling Reddy	PTS	12	May 17, 1916	21 years, 294 days	Rhode Island A.C., Thornton, Rhode Island, US	
57	Win	38–6–13	Terry Martin	PTS	12	May 10, 1916	21 years, 287 days	Rhode Island A.C., Thornton, Rhode Island, US	
56	Loss	37–6–13	Benny McCoy	NWS	10	May 1, 1916	21 years, 278 days	Pioneer Sporting Club, New York City, New York, US	
55	Loss	37–5–13	Al Shubert	PTS	12	Apr 17, 1916	21 years, 264 days	Elm Rink, New Bedford, Massachusetts, US	
54	Win	37–4–13	Mickey Dunn	NWS	10	Apr 14, 1916	21 years, 261 days	Harlem S.C., New York City, New York, US	
53	Draw	36–4–13	Benny McCoy	NWS	10	Apr 5, 1916	21 years, 252 days	Pioneer Sporting Club, New York City, New York, US	
52	Draw	36–4–12	Jimmy Pappas	PTS	10	Mar 14, 1916	21 years, 230 days	Casino Skating Rink, Atlanta, Georgia, US	
51	Win	36–4–11	Young Zulu Kid	PTS	8	Jan 13, 1916	21 years, 169 days	Memphis, Tennessee, US	
50	Win	35–4–11	Archie McLeod	NWS	8	Jan 4, 1916	21 years, 160 days	Future City A.C., Saint Louis, Missouri, US	
49	Win	34–4–11	Young Goldman	KO	1 (8)	Dec 22, 1915	21 years, 147 days	Chattanooga, Tennessee, US	
48	Win	33–4–11	Artie Armstrong	TKO	2 (8)	Dec 6, 1915	21 years, 131 days	Memphis, Tennessee, US	
47	Win	32–4–11	Battling Reddy	NWS	6	Nov 25, 1915	21 years, 120 days	National A.C., Philadelphia, Pennsylvania, US	
46	Win	31–4–11	Pete Herman	PTS	8	Nov 15, 1915	21 years, 110 days	Phoenix A.C., Memphis, Tennessee, US	
45	Win	30–4–11	Kid Williams	NWS	8	Oct 28, 1915	21 years, 92 days	Memphis, Tennessee, US	
44	Win	29–4–11	Jack Doyle	PTS	8	Oct 4, 1915	21 years, 68 days	Memphis, Tennessee, US	
43	Draw	28–4–11	Jack Doyle	PTS	8	Sep 20, 1915	21 years, 54 days	Memphis, Tennessee, US	
42	Loss	28–4–10	Sammy Sandow	PTS	8	Sep 6, 1915	21 years, 40 days	Memphis, Tennessee, US	
41	Win	28–3–10	Johnny Summers	KO	6 (10)	Jul 30, 1915	21 years, 2 days	Dauphine Theater, New Orleans, Louisiana, US	
40	Draw	27–3–10	Eddie Coulon	PTS	15	Jul 24, 1915	20 years, 361 days	Tulane Arena, New Orleans, Louisiana, US	
39	Win	27–3–9	Henry Koster	PTS	15	Jul 16, 1915	20 years, 353 days	Dauphine Theater, New Orleans, Louisiana, US	
38	Draw	26–3–9	Jack Doyle	PTS	15	Jul 9, 1915	20 years, 346 days	Dauphine Theater, New Orleans, Louisiana, US	
37	Win	26–3–8	Henry Koster	PTS	15	Jul 2, 1915	20 years, 339 days	Dauphine Theater, New Orleans, Louisiana, US	
36	Win	25–3–8	Bobby Burns	PTS	8	Jun 28, 1915	20 years, 335 days	Phoenix A.C., Memphis, Tennessee, US	
35	Draw	24–3–8	Bobby Burns	NWS	10	Jun 21, 1915	20 years, 328 days	Little Rock, Arkansas, US	
34	Draw	24–3–7	Nate Jackson	PTS	15	May 14, 1915	20 years, 290 days	Grand Opera House, Tulsa, Oklahoma, US	
33	Loss	24–3–6	Al Shubert	PTS	8	May 4, 1915	20 years, 280 days	Memphis, Tennessee, US	
32	Win	24–2–6	Jimmy Pappas	PTS	8	Apr 26, 1915	20 years, 272 days	Chattanooga, Tennessee, US	
31	Win	23–2–6	Nate Jackson	PTS	20	Apr 20, 1915	20 years, 266 days	Oklahoma City, Oklahoma, US	
30	Win	22–2–6	Lester Winters	PTS	8	Apr 13, 1915	20 years, 259 days	Nashville, Tennessee, US	
29	Win	21–2–6	Leslie Winters	PTS	8	Apr 12, 1915	20 years, 258 days	Orpheum Theater, Nashville, Tennessee, US	
28	Win	20–2–6	Johnny Ertle	PTS	8	Apr 5, 1915	20 years, 251 days	Phoenix A.C., Memphis, Tennessee, US	
27	Win	19–2–6	Young Zulu Kid	PTS	10	Mar 25, 1915	20 years, 240 days	Tommy Burns Arena, New Orleans, Louisiana, US	
26	Win	18–2–6	One Punch Hogan	PTS	10	Mar 22, 1915	20 years, 237 days	Orleans A.C., New Orleans, Louisiana, US	
25	Win	17–2–6	Jack Doyle	PTS	15	Mar 8, 1915	20 years, 223 days	Orleans A.C., New Orleans, Louisiana, US	
24	Draw	16–2–6	Jack Doyle	PTS	10	Mar 1, 1915	20 years, 216 days	Orleans A.C., New Orleans, Louisiana, US	
23	Win	16–2–5	Jack Doyle	PTS	10	Dec 30, 1914	20 years, 155 days	Orleans A.C., New Orleans, Louisiana, US	
22	Win	15–2–5	One Punch Hogan	PTS	8	Nov 23, 1914	20 years, 118 days	Memphis, Tennessee, US	
21	Draw	14–2–5	Nate Jackson	PTS	8	Nov 9, 1914	20 years, 104 days	Memphis, Tennessee, US	
20	Win	14–2–4	Red Dolan	PTS	8	Nov 2, 1914	20 years, 97 days	Memphis, Tennessee, US	
19	Draw	13–2–4	Nate Jackson	NWS	10	Oct 27, 1914	20 years, 91 days	Whittingham Park Theater, Hot Springs, Arkansas, US	
18	Loss	13–2–3	Eddie Coulon	PTS	8	Aug 31, 1914	20 years, 34 days	Memphis, Tennessee, US	
17	Win	13–1–3	Johnny Fisse	PTS	8	Aug 10, 1914	20 years, 13 days	Memphis, Tennessee, US	
16	Win	12–1–3	Tim Callahan	KO	4 (8)	Aug 3, 1914	20 years, 6 days	Memphis, Tennessee, US	
15	Win	11–1–3	Kid Russell	PTS	10	Jul 10, 1914	19 years, 347 days	Whitington Park, Hot Springs, Arkansas, US	
14	Draw	10–1–3	Nate Jackson	PTS	8	Jun 22, 1914	19 years, 329 days	Phoenix A.C., Memphis, Tennessee, US	
13	Win	10–1–2	Jimmy Pappas	PTS	8	May 25, 1914	19 years, 301 days	Phoenix A.C., Memphis, Tennessee, US	
12	Loss	9–1–2	Eddie Coulon	PTS	10	Apr 13, 1914	19 years, 259 days	Orleans A.C., New Orleans, Louisiana, US	
11	Draw	9–0–2	Jimmy Pappas	PTS	10	Apr 3, 1914	19 years, 249 days	Lyric Theater, New Orleans, Louisiana, US	
10	Draw	9–0–1	Johnny Eggers	PTS	8	Mar 27, 1914	19 years, 242 days	Matinee Hall, Chattanooga, Tennessee, US	
9	Win	9–0	Young Kid McCauley	KO	3 (8)	Feb 23, 1914	19 years, 210 days	Phoenix A.C., Memphis, Tennessee, US	
8	Win	8–0	Frankie Nurdin	PTS	10	Feb 10, 1914	19 years, 197 days	United States of America	Exact date and location unknown
7	Win	7–0	Johnny Keyes	PTS	8	Feb 2, 1914	19 years, 189 days	Phoenix A.C., Memphis, Tennessee, US	
6	Win	6–0	Shorty Anderson	PTS	8	Nov 17, 1913	19 years, 112 days	Phoenix A.C., Memphis, Tennessee, US	
5	Win	5–0	Eddie Buras	KO	1 (6)	Oct 13, 1913	19 years, 77 days	Phoenix A.C., Memphis, Tennessee, US	
4	Win	4–0	Young Battle	PTS	8	Jul 28, 1913	19 years, 0 days	Phoenix A.C., Memphis, Tennessee, US	
3	Win	3–0	Young Joe O'Hara	TKO	2 (6)	Jul 21, 1913	18 years, 358 days	Phoenix A.C., Memphis, Tennessee, US	
2	Win	2–0	Charley Wortham	TKO	4 (6)	Jul 4, 1913	18 years, 341 days	Phoenix A.C., Memphis, Tennessee, US	
1	Win	1–0	Young Heimann	TKO	2 (6)	May 19, 1913	18 years, 295 days	Phoenix A.C., Memphis, Tennessee, US	
