= Latour =

Latour may refer to:

== People ==
- LaTour, American musician

=== Surname ===
- House of Baillet
  - Alfred de Baillet Latour (1901–1980), Belgian count
  - Henri de Baillet-Latour (1876–1942), Belgian aristocrat and the third president of the International Olympic Committee
  - Maximilian Anton Karl, Count Baillet de Latour (1737–1806), a general in Austrian service
  - Theodor Franz, Count Baillet von Latour (1780–1848), Austrian soldier and statesman
- Bruno Latour (1947–2022), French sociologist
- Hanspeter Latour (born 1947), Swiss football manager and former goalkeeper
- Henri Fantin-Latour (1836–1904), French painter and lithographer
- Joseph Latour (1806–1863), French Romantic Drawer and painter
- Jason Latour (born 1977), American comic book artist and writer
- Jean Théodore Latour (1766–1837), French composer
- José Latour (born 1940), Cuban crime fiction writer
- Peter Scholl-Latour (1924–2014), German-French journalist and publicist
- Pierre Latour (born 1993), French cyclist
- Phyllis Latour (1921–2023), South African-born female Special Operations Executive spy during World War II
- René de Latour (1906–1986), Franco-American sports journalist and cycling race director
- Tuffield A. Latour (1909–1965), American Olympic bobsledder
- Tuffield Latour (born c. 1968), American bobsledder, grandson of Tuffield A. Latour

== Places ==
- Latour, Suriname, resort in Paramaribo District

=== France ===
- Marnhagues-et-Latour, Aveyron
- Miramont-Latour, Gers
- Latour, Haute-Garonne
- Latour-en-Woëvre, Meuse
- Latour-Bas-Elne, Pyrénées-Orientales
- Latour-de-Carol, Pyrénées-Orientales
- Canton of Latour-de-France, Pyrénées-Orientales
  - Latour-de-France

== Wine ==
- Château Latour, a Bordeaux wine estate in Pauillac, France, France
- Château Latour à Pomerol, a Bordeaux wine estate in Pomerol, France
- Château Latour-Martillac, a Bordeaux wine estate in Pessac-Léognan, France
- Maison Louis Latour, a wine producer based in Burgundy, France
- Georges de Latour, cuvée name of Beaulieu Vineyard in Rutherford, California

== Other uses ==
- Latour (restaurant), in Noordwijk, Netherlands
- 10311 Fantin-Latour, a main-belt asteroid named after Henri Fantin-Latour
- Allard-Latour, a French car
- Investment AB Latour, a Swedish investment company

== See also ==
- Delatour, a surname
- La Tour (surname)
- La Tour (disambiguation)
- Latur in India
- Tour (disambiguation)
- Le Tour, Tour de France
