= Boxing at the 1932 Summer Olympics – Lightweight =

Boxing competitions

The men's lightweight event was part of the boxing programme at the 1932 Summer Olympics. The weight class was the fourth-lightest contested, and allowed boxers of up to 135 pounds (61.2 kilograms). The competition was held from Tuesday, August 9, 1932 to Saturday, August 13, 1932. Thirteen boxers from 13 nations competed.

== Medalists ==
Gold	Silver	Bronze
Lawrence Stevens; South Africa	Thure Ahlqvist; Sweden	Nathan Bor; United States

== Results ==
Round of 16; August 9
Thure Ahlqvist (SWE)	-
Bye	-
Gaston Mayor (FRA)	PTS
Manuel Ponce (MEX)	L
Nathan Bor (USA)	PTS
Harry Mizler (GBR)	L
-	-
-	-
Mario Bianchini (ITA)	PTS
Bob Purdie (NZL)	L
Frankie Genovese (CAN)	PTS
Eduardo Vargas (ARG)	L
Franz Kartz (GER)	PTS
Hwang Eul-su (JPN)	L
Lawrence Stevens (RSA)	PTS
José Padilla (PHI)	L

Quarterfinals; August 10
Ahlqvist (SWE)	PTS
Mayor (FRA)	L
Bor (USA)	-
Bye	-
Bianchini (ITA)	PTS
Genovese (CAN)	L
Kartz (GER)	L
Stevens (RSA)	PTS

Semifinals; August 11
Ahlqvist (SWE)	PTS
Bor (USA)	L
Bianchini (ITA)	L
Stevens (RSA)	PTS

Final; August 13
Ahlqvist (SWE)	L
Stevens (RSA)	PTS
Bronze medal bout
Bor (USA)	PTS
Bianchini (ITA)	L
