= Petey =

Petey may refer to:

== People ==
- Petey Greene (1931–1984), African-American television and radio talk-show host
- Petey Pablo (born 1973), stage name of American rapper Moses Barrett III
- Petey Perot (born 1957), American retired National Football League player
- Petey Rosenberg (1918–1997), American professional basketball player
- Petey Sarron (1906–1994), American boxer
- Petey Scalzo (1917–1993), American boxer
- Petey Sessoms (born 1972), American retired professional basketball player
- Petey Williams (born 1981), Canadian professional wrestler
- Petey USA, American musician and TikTok personality Peter Martin (born 1991)

== Fictional characters ==
- Pete the Pup, a character in Hal Roach's Our Gang comedies, nicknamed "Petey"
- Petey Corbin, hero of Petey (novel), a 1998 children's novel by Ben Mikaelsen
- Petey, the title character of The Puppy's Further Adventures, an American animated TV series
- Petey Piranha, a recurring boss in the Mario franchise
- Petey, in the 2016 comic book Dog Man

== Other uses ==
- Petey (satellite)
- Petey (mascot), the mascot of the Canisius Golden Griffins, the athletic teams of Canisius College

== See also ==
- P. T. (disambiguation)
- PT (disambiguation)
