= Delatour =

Delatour is a French surname meaning "of the tower" (de la tour). Notable people with the surname include:

- Elisabeth Delatour Préval (born 1962), Haitian businesswoman and economist
- Jean Delatour, French cyclist
- Leslie Delatour (1950–2001), Haitian economist

== See also ==
- La Tour (surname)
- Latour (disambiguation)
- Tour (disambiguation)
