= Tourism (disambiguation) =

Tourism is travel for pleasure or business.

Tourism may also refer to:

- Tourism (constituency), a functional constituency in the elections for the Legislative Council of Hong Kong
- Tourism (Leftfield album), a live album by the English electronic music group Leftfield
- Tourism (Roxette album), a studio album by pop duo Roxette
- Tourism (film), a 2017 pseudo-documentary film by Daisuke Miyazaki

== See also ==
- Tourist (disambiguation)
- Touring (disambiguation)
