= Bob Purdie =

New Zealand boxer (1911–1982)

Personal information
- Born: Robert Purdie; 18 February 1911 Glasgow, Scotland
- Died: 9 July 1982 (aged 71)

Sport
- Country: New Zealand
- Sport: Boxing

Achievements and titles
- National finals: Featherweight champion (1930, 1931); Lightweight champion (1932)

Robert Purdie (18 February 1911 – 9 July 1982) was a New Zealand boxer. Born in Scotland, he moved to New Zealand where he won three national boxing titles in two different weight divisions. He won the Jamieson Belt for being the most scientific boxer at the 1930 national championships. At the 1932 Summer Olympics, Purdie competed in the men's lightweight division, losing to Mario Bianchini in the round of 16. He retired from the sport two years later.

== Biography ==
Purdie was born on 18 February 1911 in Glasgow, Scotland. He emigrated to New Zealand and competed as a boxer, winning three New Zealand national boxing titles. He won the featherweight division in 1930 and 1931, and the lightweight division in 1932. At the 1930 national championships, where he represented Auckland, Purdie was awarded the Jamieson Belt for being the most scientific boxer at the tournament.

Purdie was one of three New Zealand boxers who competed at the 1932 Summer Olympics held in Los Angeles. There, he fought in the round of 16 of the men's lightweight division against Mario Bianchini of Italy on 9 August 1932. Bianchini defeated Purdie on points, although the decision was controversial, with spectators booing the result and cheering in support of Purdie as he left the ring. In the event with twelve other competitors, Purdie placed equal last with five other competitors. He retired from the sport two years later.

Purdie died on 9 July 1982, and his body was cremated at Purewa Crematorium in Auckland.
