= La Tour =

La Tour may refer to:

== Places ==
=== Canada ===
- Port La Tour, Nova Scotia

=== France ===
- La Tour, Alpes-Maritimes
- La Tour, Haute-Savoie
- La Tour-Blanche, Dordogne
- La Tour-d'Aigues, Vaucluse
- La Tour-d'Auvergne, Puy-de-Dôme
- La Tour-de-Salvagny, Rhône
- La Tour-de-Sçay, Doubs
- La Tour-du-Crieu, Ariège
- La Tour-du-Meix, Jura
- La Tour-du-Pin, Isère
- La Tour-en-Jarez, Loire
- La Tour-Saint-Gelin, Indre-et-Loire
- La Tour-sur-Orb, in the Hérault

=== Switzerland ===
- La Tour-de-Trême, Fribourg
- La Tour-de-Peilz, Vaud

=== United States ===
- La Tour, Missouri

== Other uses ==
- La Tour (comic), comic book by François Schuiten and Benoît Peeters
- La Tour (surname)
- Château Latour, a French wine estate in the north-west of Bordeaux
- LaTour, American musician, disc jockey and voice over artist

== See also ==
- Latour (disambiguation)
- Latur
- Tour (disambiguation)
