= Daisuke Miyazaki =

Daisuke Miyazaki may refer to:

- Daisuke Miyazaki (filmmaker), (born 1980), a Japanese film director and screenwriter
- Daisuke Miyazaki (handballer), (born 1981), a Japanese handball player
