= Kartz =

Kartz is a surname. Notable people with the surname include:

- Franz Kartz (1907–?), German boxer
- Harry Kartz (1913–2016), British businessman
- Keith Kartz (born 1963), American football player

== See also ==
- Madagascar Kartz, a racing game
