= P. T. =

P. T. may refer to:

== People ==
- P. T. Barnum (1810-1891), American showman, politician and businessman
- P. T. Bopanna (born 1950), Indian author and journalist
- P. T. Chacko (1915-1964), Indian politician
- P. T. Chandapilla (1926-2010), Vicar General of St. Thomas Evangelical Church of India
- P. T. Daly (1870-1943), Irish trade unionist and politician
- P. T. De Silva (1929-2015), Sri Lankan physician
- P. T. Deutermann (born 1941), American writer of mystery, police procedural and thriller novels
- P. T. Srinivasa Iyengar (1863–1931), Indian historian, linguist and educationist
- P. T. Kunju Muhammed (born 1949), Indian Malayalam film director and producer and politician
- P. T. Parameshwar Naik Indian politician who assumed office in 2013
- P. T. Narasimhan (1928–2013), Indian theoretical chemist
- P. T. Rajan (1892-1974), Indian politician and barrister, Chief Minister of Madras Presidency
- Pakhal Tirumal Reddy (1915-1996), Indian painter
- P. T. Ricci (born 1987), American professional lacrosse player
- P. T. Selbit (1881–1938), English magician, inventor and writer credited with being the first person to perform the illusion of sawing a woman in half
- P. T. Selvakumar, Indian Tamil film director and producer
- P. T. Thanu Pillai, Indian politician active in the 1950s
- P. T. Thomas (born 1950), Indian politician
- P. T. Usha (born 1964), Indian retired sprinter and hurdler
- Paul Tracy (born 1968) Canadian race car Driver; frequently known as "P. T."

== Fictional characters ==
- P. T. Flea, a flea in the 1998 Disney/Pixar animated film A Bug's Life

== See also ==
- PT (disambiguation), for other uses of PT
- Petey (disambiguation)
