= La Tour (surname) =

La Tour (as distinct from Latour) is a surname. Notable people with the surname include:

- Charles de Saint-Étienne de la Tour (1593–1666), French Governor of Acadia
- Georges de La Tour (1593–1652), French Baroque painter
- Frances de la Tour (born 1944), English actress
- House of La Tour d'Auvergne, French noble family
- Henri de la Tour (disambiguation), multiple people
  - Godefroy Maurice de La Tour d'Auvergne, Duke of Bouillon (1636–1721)
  - Emmanuel Théodose de La Tour d'Auvergne (1668–1730)
  - Louis Henri de La Tour d'Auvergne (1679–1753), Count of Évreux, builder of Élysée Palace
  - Théophile Corret de la Tour d'Auvergne (1743–1800), French officer under Napoleon
- LaTour, stage name of American artist William "Bud" LaTour
- Maurice Quentin de La Tour (1704–1788), French Rococo portraitist

== See also ==
- Latour (disambiguation)
- Tour (disambiguation)
- Delatour (De la Tour)
