= Touring =

Touring may refer to:

== Travel ==
=== Vehicles ===
- Touring cars, an open car
- "Touring", the estate/wagon version of Ford cars
- Carrozzeria Touring Superleggera, Italian automobile coachbuilder

=== Tourism ===
- Bicycle touring, self-contained cycling trips
- Motorcycle touring, tourism that involves a motorcycle
- Ski touring, skiing in the backcountry on unmarked or unpatrolled areas

=== Performance ===
- Touring (band), travelling bands
- Touring theatre, travelling theatre

== Sports ==
- Touring car racing, a motorsport road racing competition
- Touring KE, a Spanish football club

== Other uses ==
- "Touring", a song by the Ramones on Mondo Bizarro
- Touring (card game), a specialty card game

== See also ==
- Tour (disambiguation)
- Turing (disambiguation)
- Tourist (disambiguation)
- Tourism (disambiguation)
