= Tourist (disambiguation) =

A tourist is a person travelling for recreational, medical, leisure or business purposes.

Tourist may also refer to:

== Arts, entertainment and media ==
=== Films ===
- The Tourist (1912 film), a silent comedy directed by Mack Sennett
- The Tourist (1921 film), a silent comedy starring Oliver Hardy
- The Tourist (1925 film), a silent comedy directed by Roscoe Arbuckle
- The Tourist (1987 film), an Australian TV film
- The Tourist (2006 film), a German-Canadian short film by Eisha Marjara
- The Tourist (2008 film) (working title) or Deception, a thriller starring Ewan McGregor, Hugh Jackman and Michelle Williams
- The Tourist (2010 film), a romantic thriller starring Johnny Depp and Angelina Jolie
- The Tourist (2016 film), an independent drama starring Brett Dalton and Stana Katic
- Tourist (film), a 2021 Russian action film
- Tourist (1990 film), clay animated short directed by Arto Halonen

=== Television ===
- The Tourist (TV series), a mystery thriller internationally co-produced television series
- "The Tourist" (Wander Over Yonder), an animated television episode

=== Literature ===
- The Tourist (comics), a 2006 graphic novel by Brian Wood
- The Tourist (novel), a 2009 espionage novel by Olen Steinhauer

=== Music ===
- Tourist (musician), an English electronic musician
- The Tourists, a 1970s British power pop band
- The Tourists (American band), a punk rock group that would become the alternative rock band Redd Kross

==== Albums ====
- Tourist (Athlete album), 2005, or the title song
- Tourist (St Germain album), 2000
- The Tourist (album), a 1998 album by Mark Mallman
- The Tourist (Clap Your Hands Say Yeah album) (2017)
- The Tourists (album), a 1979 album by the eponymous band
- Tourists (album), a 2019 album by Psapp

==== Songs ====
- "Tourist", by Juliana Hatfield from In Exile Deo
- "Tourist", by Psapp from Tourists
- "The Tourist", by Radiohead from OK Computer
- "The Tourist", by Gerry Rafferty from Night Owl (album)

== People ==
- Tourist (musician), the stage name of musician William Phillips (born 1987)
- Gennady Korotkevich (born 1994), Belarusian sport programmer who competes under the handle of "tourist"

== Other uses ==
- Tourist (horse), a racehorse
- The Tourist (train), a former train on the Isle of Wight, UK
- "Tourist guy", a hoax photograph internet meme

== See also ==
- The Touryst, 2019 video game
- Tourism (disambiguation)
- Touring (disambiguation)
