= Thure Ahlqvist =

Swedish boxer (1907–1983)

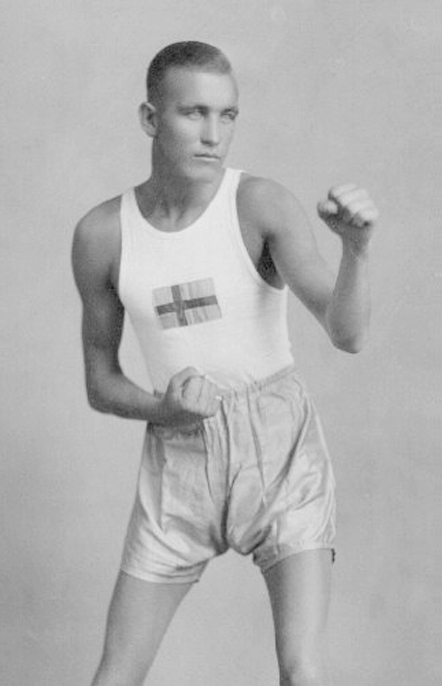

Personal information
- Born: 20 April 1907 Borås, Sweden
- Died: 20 March 1983 (aged 75) Borås, Sweden

Sport
- Sport: Boxing
- Club: IK Ymer, Borås
Medal record
Representing Sweden
Olympic Games
Silver medal – second place	1932 Los Angeles	Lightweight

Thure Johan Ahlqvist (20 April 1907 – 20 March 1983) was a Swedish lightweight boxer who won a silver medal at the 1932 Summer Olympics. A tall and mobile boxer, Ahlqvist favored fighting at a distance, occasionally throwing straight punches.

== 1932 Olympic results ==
Below are the results for Thure Ahlqvist, a Swedish lightweight boxer who competed at the 1932 Los Angeles Olympics:

- Round of 16: bye
- Quarterfinal: defeated Gaston Mayor (France) by decision
- Semifinal: defeated Nathan Bor (United States) by decision
- Final: lost to Lawrence Stevens (South Africa) by decision (was awarded silver medal)
