= Eduardo Vargas (boxer) =

Argentine boxer

Personal information
- Born: 26 February 1910; Puerto Madryn, Argentina

Sport
- Sport: Boxing

Eduardo Vargas (born 26 February 1910, date of death unknown) was an Argentine boxer. He competed in the men's lightweight event at the 1932 Summer Olympics.
