= Pro Tour =

Pro Tour may refer to:

- Pro Tour (Magic: The Gathering), an invitation-only tournament for Magic: The Gathering
- ITTF Pro Tour, table tennis tournaments sanctioned by International Table Tennis Federation
- PDC Pro Tour, darts tournaments sanctioned by the Professional Darts Corporation
- Pro Athlé Tour, a series of the foremost annual outdoor track and field meetings in France
- Pro Beach Soccer Tour, international beach soccer events
- Pro Bowlers Tour, an ABC broadcast of the Professional Bowlers Association from 1961 to 1997
- Pro Footvolley Tour, the preeminent touring series of professional footvolley in the Americas
- Pro Golf Tour, a developmental professional golf tour based in Germany
- Pro Pickleball tour, one of two tours by the APP and PPA.
- Pro Swooping tour, a professional competition circuit for canopy piloting
- UCI ProTour, a cycling competition under the Union Cycliste Internationale

== See also ==
- Pro-Touring, a style of classic muscle car
- Pro (disambiguation)
- Tour (disambiguation)
- PT (disambiguation)
