= Manuel Ponce (boxer) =

Mexican boxer

Personal information
- Nationality: Mexican
- Died: June 1935

Sport
- Sport: Boxing

Manuel Ponce (date of birth unknown, died June 1935) was a Mexican boxer. He competed in the men's lightweight event at the 1932 Summer Olympics.
