= Petey Sarron =

American boxer (1906–1994)

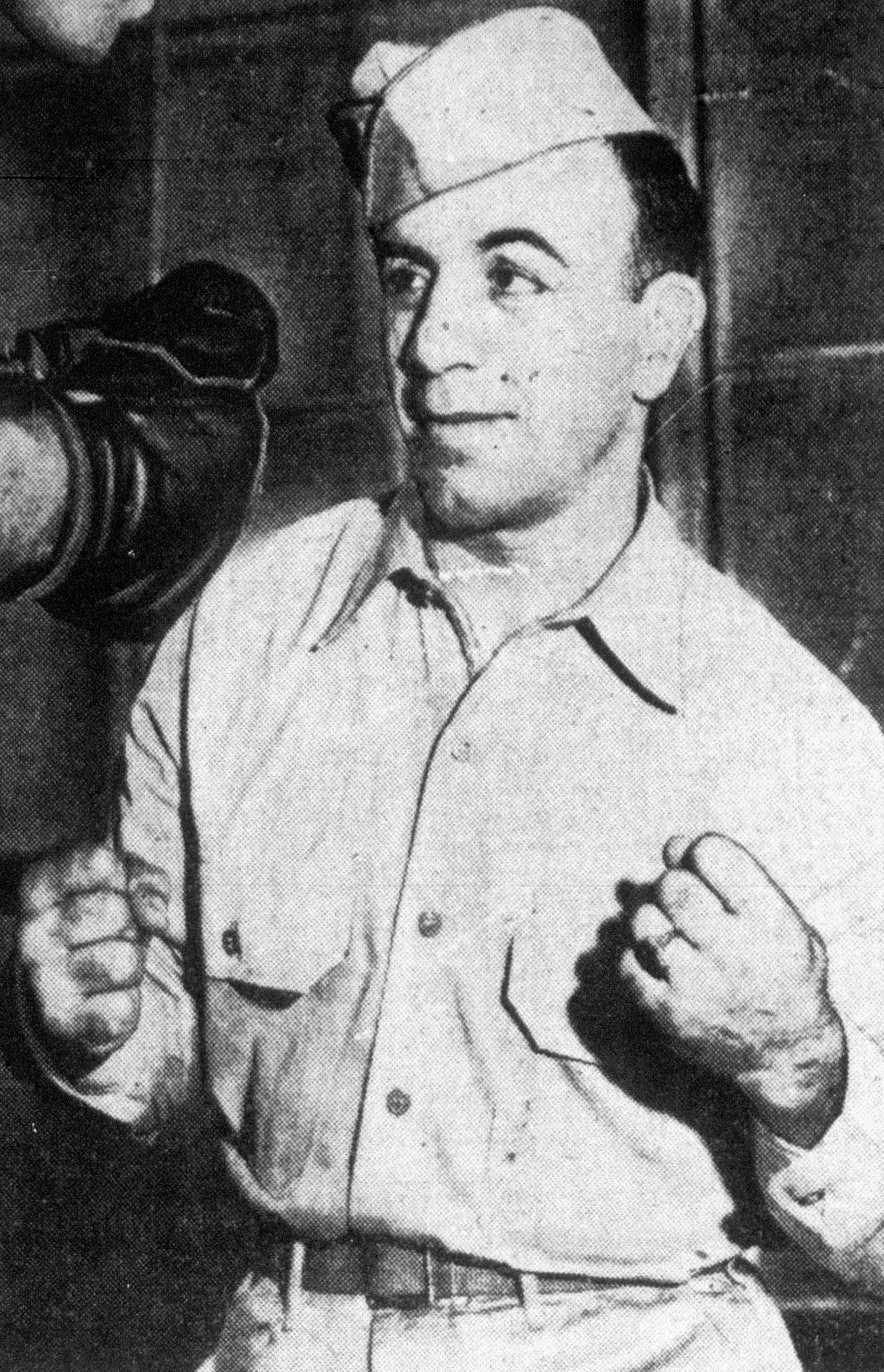
- Sarron in 1943

Personal information
- Nickname: Birmingham Bomber
- Nationality: America
- Born: Peter Sarron; November 21, 1906 Birmingham, Alabama
- Died: July 3, 1994 (aged 87) Miami, Florida
- Height: 5 ft 3 in (1.60 m)
- Weight: Featherweight

Boxing career
- Reach: 63 in (160 cm)
- Stance: Orthodox

Boxing record
- Total fights: 156; with the inclusion of newspaper decisions
- Wins: 119
- Win by KO: 21
- Losses: 24
- Draws: 13

Petey Sarron (November 21, 1906 – July 3, 1994) was an American boxer who became a National Boxing Association (NBA) Featherweight Champion on May 11, 1936, defeating Freddie Miller at Griffith Stadium in Washington, D.C. He was inducted into the International Boxing Hall of Fame in 2016.

Sarron was a member of the Olympic Team at flyweight in boxing for the United States during the 1924 Summer Olympics. Dave Evans and Jimmy Erwin worked as his managers and promoters. He was best known as a fast, elusive battler, with a windmill attack.

During his career he defeated such opponents as Benny Bass and Frankie Covelli. He lost his World Featherweight Championship to the gifted Henry Armstrong in a sixth-round knockout at Madison Square Garden.

== Early life ==
Pete Sarron was born in Birmingham, Alabama on November 21, 1906. Sarron's parents were Syrians who emigrated to Alabama from Lebanon. Like many boxers of his era, he made an early living selling newspapers, beginning at age six. Early in life, he found Dave Evans at the Birmingham Boy's Club who mentored him in boxing, and helped manage his career. He would return the favor and support the club after becoming a successful boxer. After High School, he had ambitions to study law and become an attorney.

== Amateur and early professional career ==
Sarron fought future World Flyweight Champion Fidel LaBarba at the age of eighteen in the May 1924 National AAU Flyweight Semi-final and Olympic Trials in Boston. Sarron's performance allowed him to become an alternate for the United States during the 1924 Summer Olympics. He would meet LaBarba again on April 22, 1932, before a crowd of 2,986 at Olympia Stadium in Detroit, losing the NBA World Featherweight elimination bout in a ten-round decision. The decision for LaBarba was not popular with the crowd, though he used a stinging left jab to sufficient effect to win the bout in the opinion of referee Slim McClelland. Sarron had trouble evading the jabs of LaBarba though he made a stronger finish in the last two rounds. LaBarba jabbed frequently with his long left, but tired somewhat in the last two rounds, when Sarron made a stand though his punches lacked the authority to do much damage.

== Defeating former NBA Flyweight Champion Pinky Silverberg ==
On May 25, 1929, Sarron defeated Pinky Silverberg, in an important fifteen round points decision in Melbourne, Australia in the featherweight range at 120 pounds. Silverberg had formerly held the NBA World Flyweight Championship in 1927–8, but had been stripped of the title, and was fighting at the lower featherweight range of 120 with Sarron.

On January 23, 1934, Sarron, at the featherweight range of 128 pounds, met Frankie Covelli at Portner's Arena in Alexandria, Virginia, losing in a ten-round points decision. On March 8, 1935, however, he beat Covelli at the Coliseum in Coral Gables, Florida in a ten-round points decision. In 1940, Covelli would contend for the NBA World Featherweight Title in Washington D.C.

On June 29, 1934, Sarron defeated former British and Canadian World Lightweight Champion Al Foreman on June 29, 1934, at Griffith Stadium in Washington, D.C. Sarron had defeated one of his best known opponents in an early win, but it was to be the last professional bout for Foreman, the Jewish Canadian champion who retired to Montreal. Known for his boxing in the America, Foreman had served two years boxing for the US Army in 1924–26, and had been stationed in Virginia. He continued to fight in the States through 1927, and had fought in Washington D.C. on several previous occasions.

Sarron first met Benny Bass on August 27, 1934, at Griffith Stadium in Washington D.C., winning in a sixth round disqualification. Sarron had a small reach advantage of nearly two inches. He defeated Bass in the next bout on September 24, before 5,000 fans at the Arena in Philadelphia in a ten-round decision. Sarron, who was fouled in the seventh, came back to briefly drop Bass to the floor, and then gain more points in the eighth, reigning a series of blows on the former champion. Sarron took chances with Bass, acting as the aggressor from the start, and boxing a fast-paced bout. In December 1929 Bass had taken the World Jr. Lightweight Title.

== Bouts with Freddie Miller, Feather Champ ==
On March 2, 1936, Sarron met Southpaw Freddie Miller at the Coliseum in Coral Gables, Florida losing in a fifteen-round decision. The Referee and one judge scored the fight for Miller with 6 rounds won, 3 tied, and 6 even. Two of the six rounds given to Miller were due to Sarron fouls.

=== Winning Featherweight Championship, 1936 ===
On May 11, 1936, Sarron first took the National Boxing Association World Featherweight championship from Freddie Miller in a fifteen-round points decision at Griffith Stadium, an American League ball park, in Washington D. C. Before an impressive crowd of 23,000, Sarron swarmed over Miller, came up with an early lead in points, and nearly scored knockouts in the thirteen and fifteenth rounds. Sarron had previously lost to Miller three times. The new champion bobbed and weaved expertly, sometimes ducking close to the floor to avoid the blows of Miller, who seemed to have an advantage in the first four rounds. In the ninth through fifteenth, Sarron showed his strongest advantage. Sarron collected the relatively modest sum of $10,000 for his win.

=== First defense of Feather Title ===
Sarron staged his first defense of the World Featherweight Title on July 22, 1936, winning a fifteen-round unanimous decision against Cuban southpaw Baby Manuel at the Sportatorium in Dallas, Texas. In Texas's first championship bout before a crowd of 4,5000, Sarron, though briefly down in the first, punched his way confidently through for the rest of the match and gained a commanding lead in points and a decisive victory.

==== Win over Laurie Stevens ====
Fighting as a lightweight, on January 16, 1937, Sarron defeated Laurie Stevens in a non-title fight at Wanderer's Stadium in Johannesburg in a twelfth-round knockout. Stevens had taken the South African Lightweight title in 1933 as well as the British Empire Lightweight Championship in January, 1936, only one year before his meeting with Sarron. Stevens was also a former British Olympic boxer.

Sarron challenged champion Freddie Miller again on July 31, 1937, in an important ten round non-title bout in Johannesburg, but lost the decision.

=== 2nd defense Featherweight Title ===
Sarron and Miller fought a fierce rematch in an NBA World Featherweight Championship bout two months later on September 4, 1937, before a crowd of 25,000 in Johannesburg and Sarron won a majority decision. Sarron floored Miller twice for a decisive victory. Miller was floored for a count of seven in the sixth round from a left cross by Sarron. In the twelfth, Sarron scored a knockdown with a hard right for a count of three.

== Loss of Feather Championship ==
Sarron lost his title to the exceptional black boxing champion Henry Armstrong in a sixth-round knockout on October 29, 1937, before a crowd of 11,847 at Madison Square Garden. Several sources reported it was Sarron's first knockout in twelve years of fighting. Sarron looked in control in the first, but by the second round had been staggered by the blows of Armstrong, who would have won the third but for a low blow dealt to Sarron. Sarron managed to remain even in the fourth but by the fifth was again badly staggered by a blow from Armstrong, who had no trouble ending the bout in the sixth with a left hook to the chin of Sarron who tried vainly to cover with his gloves. The following year the incomparable Armstrong took both the World Welterweight and World Lightweight Championships.

Sarron retired from boxing on July 17, 1939, after losing his last bout, a ten-round points decision against Sammy Angott at Forbes Field in Pittsburgh, Pennsylvania.

== Life after boxing ==
During his life, Sarron enjoyed reading golfing, and fishing, and had ambitions to become an attorney and study law. He was studious and articulate for a young man who chose boxing as a profession.

In late 1953, he became the Secretary of the Miami Boxing Commission. He married Patrinilla "Pat" Farah, who was also of Lebanese/Syrian descent. The couple had two boys, Peter and Ronald. Throughout his life, Sarron maintained a very close relationship with his family. During the 1960s, Sarron worked as an enforcement agent for the Florida Beverage Department, enforcing state and federal tobacco laws. He eventually retired in Miami and died there at age 87 on July 3, 1994.

== Achievements and honors ==
Sarron was featured on the cover of the November 1936 The Ring magazine.

He was an inductee into the 2016 International Boxing Hall of Fame.

== Professional boxing record ==
All information in this section is derived from BoxRec, unless otherwise stated.

=== Official record ===
| 156 fights | 101 wins | 23 losses |
|---|---|---|
| By knockout | 21 | 1 |
| By decision | 78 | 18 |
| By disqualification | 2 | 4 |
| Draws | 12 | |
| Newspaper decisions/draws | 20 | |

All newspaper decisions are officially regarded as “no decision” bouts and are not counted in the win/loss/draw column.

| No. | Result | Record | Opponent | Type | Round | Date | Location | Notes |
|---|---|---|---|---|---|---|---|---|
| 156 | Loss | 101–23–12 (20) | Sammy Angott | PTS | 10 | Jul 17, 1939 | Forbes Field, Pittsburgh, Pennsylvania, U.S. | |
| 155 | Win | 101–22–12 (20) | Yucatán Kid | MD | 10 | Jun 15, 1939 | City Stadium, Richmond, Virginia, U.S. | |
| 154 | Win | 100–22–12 (20) | Wishy Jones | NWS | 10 | Mar 30, 1939 | City Auditorium, Birmingham, Alabama, U.S. | |
| 153 | Win | 100–22–12 (19) | Yucatán Kid | PTS | 10 | Dec 16, 1938 | Beach Arena, Miami Beach, Florida, U.S. | |
| 152 | Win | 99–22–12 (19) | Mike Gamiere | PTS | 10 | Dec 5, 1938 | Arena, Cleveland, Ohio, U.S. | |
| 151 | Win | 98–22–12 (19) | Yucatán Kid | PTS | 15 | Oct 3, 1938 | Griffith Stadium, Washington, D.C., U.S. | |
| 150 | Win | 97–22–12 (19) | Lou Gevinson | PTS | 10 | May 20, 1938 | Griffith Stadium, Washington, D.C., U.S. | |
| 149 | Win | 96–22–12 (19) | Joey Green | NWS | 10 | Apr 11, 1938 | American Legion Arena, Mobile, Alabama, U.S. | |
| 148 | Win | 96–22–12 (18) | Joey Temmes | PTS | 10 | Mar 15, 1938 | Greenwood, Mississippi, U.S. | |
| 147 | Win | 95–22–12 (18) | Bobby Britton | PTS | 10 | Feb 15, 1938 | Coliseum, Coral Gables, Florida, U.S. | |
| 146 | Win | 94–22–12 (18) | Ray Ingram | PTS | 10 | Dec 20, 1937 | City Auditorium, Richmond, Virginia, U.S. | |
| 145 | Win | 93–22–12 (18) | Carl Guggino | PTS | 10 | Dec 8, 1937 | Hippodrome, New York City, New York, U.S. | |
| 144 | Loss | 92–22–12 (18) | Henry Armstrong | KO | 6 (15) | Oct 29, 1937 | Madison Square Garden, New York City, New York, U.S. | Lost NBA and The Ring featherweight titles; For vacant NYSAC featherweight titles |
| 143 | Win | 92–21–12 (18) | Teddy Braun | PTS | 10 | Sep 9, 1937 | Old Drill Hall, Cape Town, Western Cape, South Africa | |
| 142 | Win | 91–21–12 (18) | Freddie Miller | PTS | 12 | Sep 4, 1937 | Wanderers Stadium, Johannesburg, Gauteng, South Africa | Retained NBA and The Ring featherweight titles |
| 141 | Loss | 90–21–12 (18) | Freddie Miller | PTS | 10 | Jul 31, 1937 | Wanderers Stadium, Johannesburg, Gauteng, South Africa | |
| 140 | Loss | 90–20–12 (18) | Harry Mizler | DQ | 1 (10) | May 6, 1937 | Wanderers Stadium, Johannesburg, Gauteng, South Africa | Sarron struck Mizler a low blow in the first round of a scheduled ten-rounder and was disqualified |
| 139 | Loss | 90–19–12 (18) | Dave Crowley | DQ | 9 (10) | May 6, 1937 | Harringay Arena, Harringay, London, England | Sarron DQ'd for hitting with an open glove after repeated warnings |
| 138 | Win | 90–18–12 (18) | Harry Mizler | PTS | 10 | Apr 15, 1937 | Harringay Arena, Harringay, London, England | |
| 137 | Win | 89–18–12 (18) | Andy Martin | KO | 5 (12) | Feb 27, 1937 | Wanderers Stadium, Johannesburg, Gauteng, South Africa | |
| 136 | Win | 88–18–12 (18) | Lawrence Stevens | KO | 12 (12) | Jan 16, 1937 | Wanderers Stadium, Johannesburg, Gauteng, South Africa | |
| 135 | Draw | 87–18–12 (18) | Nick Camarata | PTS | 10 | Sep 14, 1936 | City Stadium, Richmond, Virginia, U.S. | |
| 134 | Win | 87–18–11 (18) | Jackie Carter | PTS | 10 | Aug 26, 1936 | Idora Park, Youngstown, Ohio, U.S. | |
| 133 | Win | 86–18–11 (18) | Davey Abad | PTS | 10 | Jul 31, 1936 | Legion Stadium, Hollywood, California, U.S. | |
| 132 | Win | 85–18–11 (18) | Baby Manuel | UD | 15 | Jul 22, 1936 | Sportatorium, Dallas, Texas, U.S. | Retained NBA and The Ring featherweight titles |
| 131 | Win | 84–18–11 (18) | Bobby Dean | KO | 5 (10) | Jul 7, 1936 | Griffith Stadium, Washington, D.C., U.S. | |
| 130 | Win | 83–18–11 (18) | Lloyd Pine | PTS | 10 | Jun 23, 1936 | League Park, Akron, Ohio, U.S. | |
| 129 | Win | 82–18–11 (18) | Nick Camarata | PTS | 10 | Jun 15, 1936 | Jai Alai Fronton, Arabi, Louisiana, U.S. | |
| 128 | Win | 81–18–11 (18) | Freddie Miller | MD | 15 | May 11, 1936 | Griffith Stadium, Washington, D.C., U.S. | Won NBA and The Ring featherweight titles |
| 127 | Loss | 80–18–11 (18) | Freddie Miller | PTS | 15 | Mar 2, 1936 | Coliseum, Coral Gables, Florida, U.S. | For NBA and The Ring featherweight titles |
| 126 | Win | 80–17–11 (18) | Carl Guggino | PTS | 10 | Jan 16, 1936 | Miami Stadium, Miami, Florida, U.S. | |
| 125 | Draw | 79–17–11 (18) | Carl Guggino | PTS | 10 | Dec 5, 1935 | Cinderella Ballroom, Miami, Florida, U.S. | |
| 124 | Win | 79–17–10 (18) | Jimmy McNamara | PTS | 10 | Nov 28, 1935 | Cinderella Ballroom, Miami, Florida, U.S. | |
| 123 | Win | 78–17–10 (18) | Andy Martin | NWS | 10 | Nov 6, 1935 | City Auditorium, Birmingham, Alabama, U.S. | |
| 122 | Win | 78–17–10 (17) | California Joe Rivers | PTS | 10 | Sep 30, 1935 | Griffith Stadium, Washington, D.C., U.S. | |
| 121 | Win | 77–17–10 (17) | Young Chocolate | UD | 10 | Sep 14, 1935 | Rose Gardens Stadium, Kingston, Jamaica | |
| 120 | Win | 76–17–10 (17) | Joey Temmes | PTS | 10 | Aug 12, 1935 | Griffith Stadium, Washington, D.C., U.S. | |
| 119 | Win | 75–17–10 (17) | California Joe Rivers | PTS | 10 | Mar 25, 1935 | Auditorium, Washington, D.C., U.S. | |
| 118 | Win | 74–17–10 (17) | Frankie Covelli | PTS | 10 | Mar 8, 1935 | Coliseum, Coral Gables, Florida, U.S. | |
| 117 | Win | 73–17–10 (17) | Baby Manuel | PTS | 10 | Feb 25, 1935 | Beach Arena, Miami Beach, Florida, U.S. | |
| 116 | Win | 72–17–10 (17) | Patsy Severo | PTS | 10 | Feb 18, 1935 | Cinderella Ballroom, Miami, Florida, U.S. | |
| 115 | Win | 71–17–10 (17) | California Joe Rivers | PTS | 10 | Jan 28, 1935 | Auditorium, Washington, D.C., U.S. | |
| 114 | Win | 70–17–10 (17) | Frankie Wallace | PTS | 10 | Oct 15, 1934 | Arena, Philadelphia, Pennsylvania, U.S. | |
| 113 | Win | 69–17–10 (17) | Benny Bass | MD | 10 | Sep 24, 1934 | Arena, Philadelphia, Pennsylvania, U.S. | |
| 112 | Win | 68–17–10 (17) | Benny Bass | DQ | 6 (10) | Aug 27, 1934 | Griffith Stadium, Washington, D.C., U.S. | |
| 111 | Win | 67–17–10 (17) | Al Foreman | SD | 10 | Jun 29, 1934 | Griffith Stadium, Washington, D.C., U.S. | |
| 110 | Loss | 66–17–10 (17) | Lew Feldman | PTS | 8 | May 11, 1934 | Madison Square Garden, New York City, New York, U.S. | |
| 109 | Win | 66–16–10 (17) | Ray Schneider | PTS | 10 | Mar 27, 1934 | Duval County Armory, Jacksonville, Florida, U.S. | |
| 108 | Win | 65–16–10 (17) | Bucky Burton | PTS | 12 | Mar 12, 1934 | Biscayne Arena, Miami, Florida, U.S. | |
| 107 | Loss | 64–16–10 (17) | Bucky Burton | SD | 10 | Feb 19, 1934 | Biscayne Arena, Miami, Florida, U.S. | |
| 106 | Loss | 64–15–10 (17) | Freddie Miller | PTS | 10 | Feb 7, 1934 | Music Hall Arena, Cincinnati, Ohio, U.S. | |
| 105 | Loss | 64–14–10 (17) | Frankie Covelli | PTS | 10 | Jan 23, 1934 | Portner's Arena, Alexandria, Virginia, U.S. | |
| 104 | Win | 64–13–10 (17) | Bucky Burton | PTS | 10 | Dec 11, 1933 | Biscayne Arena, Miami, Florida, U.S. | |
| 103 | Win | 63–13–10 (17) | Varias Milling | PTS | 10 | Nov 28, 1933 | Portner's Arena, Alexandria, Virginia, U.S. | |
| 102 | Loss | 62–13–10 (17) | Freddie Miller | UD | 10 | Nov 1, 1933 | Portner's Arena, Alexandria, Virginia, U.S. | |
| 101 | Win | 62–12–10 (17) | Eddie Burl | PTS | 10 | Oct 17, 1933 | Portner's Arena, Alexandria, Virginia, U.S. | |
| 100 | Win | 61–12–10 (17) | Mickey Genaro | PTS | 10 | Sep 20, 1933 | Twin City Arena, Laurel, Maryland, U.S. | |
| 99 | Draw | 60–12–10 (17) | Eddie Burl | PTS | 10 | Aug 15, 1933 | Twin City Arena, Laurel, Maryland, U.S. | |
| 98 | Loss | 60–12–9 (17) | Eddie Burl | PTS | 10 | Jul 18, 1933 | Twin City Arena, Laurel, Maryland, U.S. | |
| 97 | Win | 60–11–9 (17) | Johnny Farr | PTS | 8 | Jun 6, 1933 | Portner's Arena, Alexandria, Virginia, U.S. | |
| 96 | Win | 59–11–9 (17) | Johnny Datto | NWS | 10 | Jun 1, 1933 | City Auditorium, Birmingham, Alabama, U.S. | |
| 95 | Win | 59–11–9 (16) | Johnny Datto | TKO | 1 (10) | May 12, 1933 | Northside Arena, Pittsburgh, Pennsylvania, U.S. | |
| 94 | Draw | 58–11–9 (16) | Tommy Paul | PTS | 10 | May 9, 1933 | Portner's Arena, Alexandria, Virginia, U.S. | |
| 93 | Draw | 58–11–8 (16) | Tommy Paul | MD | 8 | Apr 25, 1933 | Portner's Arena, Alexandria, Virginia, U.S. | |
| 92 | Win | 58–11–7 (16) | Miki Gelb | PTS | 8 | Mar 28, 1933 | Portner's Arena, Alexandria, Virginia, U.S. | |
| 91 | Win | 57–11–7 (16) | Benny Schwartz | KO | 7 (8) | Mar 7, 1933 | Portner's Arena, Alexandria, Virginia, U.S. | |
| 90 | Win | 56–11–7 (16) | Frankie DeAngelo | TKO | 7 (8) | Feb 14, 1933 | Portner's Arena, Alexandria, Virginia, U.S. | |
| 89 | Draw | 55–11–7 (16) | Charley Van Reedon | PTS | 10 | Jan 25, 1933 | Duval County Armory, Jacksonville, Florida, U.S. | |
| 88 | Loss | 55–11–6 (16) | Harry Sankey | PTS | 10 | Apr 29, 1932 | Arena, New Haven, Connecticut, U.S. | |
| 87 | Loss | 55–10–6 (16) | Fidel LaBarba | PTS | 10 | Apr 22, 1932 | Olympia Stadium, Detroit, Michigan, U.S. | |
| 86 | Win | 55–9–6 (16) | Chico Cisneros | PTS | 10 | Mar 24, 1932 | Cinderella Ballroom, Miami, Florida, U.S. | |
| 85 | Draw | 54–9–6 (16) | Chico Cisneros | PTS | 10 | Feb 25, 1932 | Biscayne Arena, Miami, Florida, U.S. | |
| 84 | Win | 54–9–5 (16) | Charley Van Reedon | KO | 1 (10) | Feb 11, 1932 | Cinderella Ballroom, Miami, Florida, U.S. | |
| 83 | Win | 53–9–5 (16) | Mickey Genaro | UD | 10 | Jan 19, 1932 | Duval County Armory, Jacksonville, Florida, U.S. | |
| 82 | Win | 52–9–5 (16) | Gilbert Castillo | PTS | 10 | Nov 26, 1931 | Cinderella Ballroom, Miami, Florida, U.S. | |
| 81 | Win | 51–9–5 (16) | Charley Van Reedon | PTS | 10 | Nov 17, 1931 | Armory, Jacksonville, Florida, U.S. | |
| 80 | Win | 50–9–5 (16) | Midget Mike O'Dowd | TKO | 3 (10) | Nov 9, 1931 | City Auditorium, Birmingham, Alabama, U.S. | |
| 79 | Win | 49–9–5 (16) | Eddie Burl | PTS | 10 | Nov 4, 1931 | Armory, Jacksonville, Florida, U.S. | |
| 78 | Win | 48–9–5 (16) | Gilbert Castillo | PTS | 10 | Jul 24, 1931 | Cinderella Ballroom, Miami, Florida, U.S. | |
| 77 | Win | 47–9–5 (16) | Gilbert Castillo | PTS | 10 | Jul 10, 1931 | Cinderella Ballroom, Miami, Florida, U.S. | |
| 76 | Draw | 46–9–5 (16) | Midget Mike O'Dowd | PTS | 8 | Jul 4, 1931 | American Legion Stadium, Greenwood, Mississippi, U.S. | |
| 75 | Win | 46–9–4 (16) | Babe Ruth | PTS | 10 | Jun 11, 1931 | American Legion Stadium, Greenwood, Mississippi, U.S. | |
| 74 | Win | 45–9–4 (16) | Davey Abad | NWS | 10 | Jun 8, 1931 | City Auditorium, Birmingham, Alabama, U.S. | |
| 73 | Win | 45–9–4 (15) | Mickey Genaro | NWS | 10 | Apr 27, 1931 | City Auditorium, Birmingham, Alabama, U.S. | |
| 72 | Win | 45–9–4 (14) | Tony Leto | KO | 4 (10) | Mar 16, 1931 | City Auditorium, Birmingham, Alabama, U.S. | |
| 71 | Win | 44–9–4 (14) | Emil Paluso | NWS | 10 | Feb 2, 1931 | City Auditorium, Birmingham, Alabama, U.S. | |
| 70 | Win | 44–9–4 (13) | Johnnie Leckie | PTS | 15 | Aug 5, 1930 | Opera House, Palmerston North, New Zealand | |
| 69 | Win | 43–9–4 (13) | Sammy Shack | PTS | 15 | Jun 21, 1930 | Kensington Drill Hall, Dunedin, New Zealand | |
| 68 | Loss | 42–9–4 (13) | Tommy Donovan | PTS | 15 | May 3, 1930 | Speedway Stadium, Dunedin, New Zealand | |
| 67 | Loss | 42–8–4 (13) | Tommy Donovan | PTS | 15 | Mar 29, 1930 | Kilbirnie Stadium, Wellington, New Zealand | |
| 66 | Loss | 42–7–4 (13) | Tommy Donovan | DQ | 7 (15) | Mar 15, 1930 | Western Park, New Plymouth, New Zealand | |
| 65 | Win | 42–6–4 (13) | Johnnie Leckie | PTS | 15 | Feb 4, 1930 | Town Hall, Wellington, New Zealand | |
| 64 | Win | 41–6–4 (13) | Johnnie Leckie | PTS | 15 | Jan 1, 1930 | Municipal Theatre, Napier, New Zealand | |
| 63 | Win | 40–6–4 (13) | Billy Grime | TKO | 14 (15) | Dec 27, 1929 | Town Hall, Auckland, New Zealand | |
| 62 | Win | 39–6–4 (13) | Billy Grime | TKO | 14 (15) | Dec 17, 1929 | Town Hall, Wellington, New Zealand | |
| 61 | Win | 38–6–4 (13) | Jack Jones | TKO | 11 (15) | Dec 2, 1929 | Town Hall, Wellington, New Zealand | |
| 60 | Win | 37–6–4 (13) | Billy Grime | PTS | 15 | Nov 8, 1929 | Brisbane Stadium, Brisbane, Queensland, Australia | |
| 59 | Win | 36–6–4 (13) | Billy Grime | RTD | 9 (15) | Oct 12, 1929 | Sydney Stadium, Sydney, New South Wales, Australia | |
| 58 | Loss | 35–6–4 (13) | Billy Grime | PTS | 15 | Sep 7, 1929 | Sydney Stadium, Sydney, New South Wales, Australia | |
| 57 | Draw | 35–5–4 (13) | Dick Corbett | PTS | 15 | Aug 14, 1929 | Brisbane Stadium, Brisbane, Queensland, Australia | |
| 56 | Win | 35–5–3 (13) | Johnnie Leckie | KO | 13 (15) | Jul 27, 1929 | Sydney Stadium, Sydney, New South Wales, Australia | |
| 55 | Win | 34–5–3 (13) | Young Siki | PTS | 15 | Jul 20, 1929 | West Melbourne Stadium, Melbourne, Victoria, Australia | |
| 54 | Loss | 33–5–3 (13) | Johnnie Leckie | PTS | 15 | Jun 22, 1929 | Sydney Stadium, Sydney, New South Wales, Australia | |
| 53 | Win | 33–4–3 (13) | Pinky Silverberg | PTS | 15 | May 25, 1929 | West Melbourne Stadium, Melbourne, Victoria, Australia | |
| 52 | Win | 32–4–3 (13) | Charlie Glasson | KO | 5 (15) | May 11, 1929 | West Melbourne Stadium, Melbourne, Victoria, Australia | |
| 51 | Loss | 31–4–3 (13) | Mickey Gill | PTS | 10 | Mar 6, 1929 | Hot Springs, Arkansas, U.S. | |
| 50 | Win | 31–3–3 (13) | Johnny Erickson | NWS | 6 | Jan 18, 1929 | Coliseum, Chicago, Illinois, U.S. | |
| 49 | Win | 31–3–3 (12) | Emil Paluso | NWS | 10 | Dec 3, 1928 | Birmingham A.C., Birmingham, Alabama, U.S. | |
| 48 | Win | 31–3–3 (11) | Jimmy McDermott | PTS | 10 | Nov 1, 1928 | American Legion Stadium, Greenwood, Mississippi, U.S. | |
| 47 | Win | 30–3–3 (11) | Harry Forbes | PTS | 10 | Oct 18, 1928 | American Legion Stadium, Greenwood, Mississippi, U.S. | |
| 46 | Win | 29–3–3 (11) | Benny Schwartz | NWS | 10 | Oct 9, 1928 | City Auditorium, Birmingham, Alabama, U.S. | |
| 45 | Loss | 29–3–3 (10) | Emil Paluso | PTS | 10 | Sep 21, 1928 | Coliseum Arena, New Orleans, Louisiana, U.S. | |
| 44 | Win | 29–2–3 (10) | Kid Pancho | PTS | 12 | Sep 7, 1928 | Market Square Garden, Oklahoma City, Oklahoma, U.S. | |
| 43 | Win | 28–2–3 (10) | Mike Sansone | PTS | 10 | Aug 23, 1928 | American Legion Stadium, Greenwood, Mississippi, U.S. | |
| 42 | Win | 27–2–3 (10) | Mike Sansone | PTS | 10 | Aug 2, 1928 | American Legion Stadium, Greenwood, Mississippi, U.S. | |
| 41 | Win | 26–2–3 (10) | Kid Pancho | PTS | 10 | Jul 9, 1928 | Market Square Garden, Oklahoma City, Oklahoma, U.S. | |
| 40 | Win | 25–2–3 (10) | Joe Lucas | NWS | 10 | Jun 4, 1928 | Birmingham A.C., Birmingham, Alabama, U.S. | |
| 39 | Win | 25–2–3 (9) | Quina Lee | KO | 8 (10) | May 21, 1928 | Birmingham A.C., Birmingham, Alabama, U.S. | |
| 38 | Win | 24–2–3 (9) | Mickey Gill | PTS | 8 | Apr 9, 1928 | Memphis, Tennessee, U.S. | |
| 37 | Win | 23–2–3 (9) | Joe Lucas | PTS | 10 | Apr 3, 1928 | Savannah, Georgia, U.S. | |
| 36 | Win | 22–2–3 (9) | Jackie Daley | NWS | 10 | Mar 26, 1928 | Birmingham A.C., Birmingham, Alabama, U.S. | |
| 35 | Win | 22–2–3 (8) | Pinky May | NWS | 10 | Feb 27, 1928 | Birmingham A.C., Birmingham, Alabama, U.S. | |
| 34 | Win | 22–2–3 (7) | Dudley Stadler | TKO | 6 (12) | Feb 19, 1928 | Hi-Way Park, Gretna, Louisiana, U.S. | |
| 33 | Draw | 21–2–3 (7) | Pinky May | PTS | 10 | Jan 26, 1928 | Savannah, Georgia, U.S. | |
| 32 | Win | 21–2–2 (7) | Steve Stetson | KO | 2 (10) | Jan 16, 1928 | City Auditorium, Birmingham, Alabama, U.S. | |
| 31 | Win | 20–2–2 (7) | Bobby Binckley | PTS | 10 | Dec 15, 1927 | Memphis, Tennessee, U.S. | |
| 30 | Win | 19–2–2 (7) | Johnny Franks | PTS | 8 | Nov 28, 1927 | Memphis Stadium, Memphis, Tennessee, U.S. | |
| 29 | Win | 18–2–2 (7) | Steve Stetson | NWS | 10 | Nov 21, 1927 | Birmingham A.C., Birmingham, Alabama, U.S. | |
| 28 | Win | 18–2–2 (6) | Leroy Dougan | PTS | 8 | Oct 31, 1927 | Memphis Stadium, Memphis, Tennessee, U.S. | |
| 27 | Win | 17–2–2 (6) | Memphis Pal Moore | PTS | 8 | Oct 17, 1927 | Memphis Stadium, Memphis, Tennessee, U.S. | |
| 26 | Win | 16–2–2 (6) | Bud Harris | KO | 4 (10) | Oct 3, 1927 | Birmingham A.C., Birmingham, Alabama, U.S. | |
| 25 | Win | 15–2–2 (6) | Tony Leto | DQ | 3 (10) | Sep 12, 1927 | Miami Field, Miami, Florida, U.S. | Leto was disqualified for punching low |
| 24 | Win | 14–2–2 (6) | Tony Leto | PTS | 10 | Aug 22, 1927 | Miami Field, Miami, Florida, U.S. | |
| 23 | Win | 13–2–2 (6) | Benny Regan | NWS | 10 | Aug 4, 1927 | Stalllworth Casino, Tuscaloosa, Alabama, U.S. | |
| 22 | Win | 13–2–2 (5) | Memphis Pal Moore | NWS | 10 | Aug 1, 1927 | Birmingham A.C., Birmingham, Alabama, U.S. | |
| 21 | Win | 13–2–2 (4) | Leroy Dougan | NWS | 10 | Jul 18, 1927 | Birmingham A.C., Birmingham, Alabama, U.S. | |
| 20 | Win | 13–2–2 (3) | Benny Regan | PTS | 10 | Jul 4, 1927 | Ponce de Leon Ballpark, Atlanta, Georgia, U.S. | |
| 19 | Win | 12–2–2 (3) | Benny Regan | PTS | 10 | May 16, 1927 | Birmingham A.C., Birmingham, Alabama, U.S. | |
| 18 | Win | 11–2–2 (3) | Bud Harris | PTS | 10 | Apr 25, 1927 | Masonic Temple, Birmingham, Alabama, U.S. | |
| 17 | Win | 10–2–2 (3) | Leroy Jordan | KO | 3 (10) | Apr 11, 1927 | Birmingham A.C., Birmingham, Alabama, U.S. | |
| 16 | Win | 9–2–2 (3) | Tommy Williams | PTS | 6 | Apr 2, 1927 | Race Track Arena, Pompano Beach, Florida, U.S. | |
| 15 | Win | 8–2–2 (3) | Happy Atherton | MD | 10 | Mar 18, 1927 | Legion Arena, Lake Worth, Florida, U.S. | |
| 14 | Draw | 7–2–2 (3) | Tony Leto | PTS | 10 | Dec 23, 1926 | Miami Field, Miami, Florida, U.S. | |
| 13 | Win | 7–2–1 (3) | Johnny Moore | PTS | 10 | Dec 9, 1926 | Miami Field, Miami, Florida, U.S. | |
| 12 | Win | 6–2–1 (3) | Harry Allen | PTS | 10 | Oct 28, 1926 | Miami Field, Miami, Florida, U.S. | |
| 11 | Loss | 5–2–1 (3) | Genaro Pino | PTS | 10 | Sep 9, 1926 | Miami Field, Miami, Florida, U.S. | |
| 10 | Draw | 5–1–1 (3) | Genaro Pino | PTS | 10 | Aug 26, 1926 | Miami Field, Miami, Florida, U.S. | |
| 9 | Win | 5–1 (3) | Mutt Griffin | NWS | 10 | Jul 29, 1926 | Miami Field, Miami, Florida, U.S. | |
| 8 | Draw | 4–1 (3) | Mickey Gill | NWS | 10 | Nov 23, 1925 | Miami Field, Miami, Florida, U.S. | |
| 7 | Loss | 4–1 (2) | Mickey Gill | NWS | 10 | Nov 2, 1925 | Miami Field, Miami, Florida, U.S. | |
| 6 | Win | 4–1 (1) | Battling Dick Bowden | KO | 1 (10) | Oct 26, 1925 | Miami Field, Miami, Florida, U.S. | |
| 5 | Loss | 3–1 (1) | Red Keenan | DQ | 6 (10) | Sep 7, 1925 | Biscayne Stadium, Miami, Florida, U.S. | |
| 4 | Win | 3–0 (1) | Billy Cecil | NWS | 8 | Feb 13, 1925 | Stansanco A.C., Louisville, Kentucky, U.S. | |
| 3 | Win | 3–0 | Red Burke | PTS | 10 | Dec 3, 1924 | Birmingham A.C., Birmingham, Alabama, U.S. | |
| 2 | Win | 2–0 | Dude Gustin | PTS | 8 | Dec 2, 1924 | Gulf State Steel YMCA, Gadsden, Alabama, U.S. | |
| 1 | Win | 1–0 | Red Burke | PTS | 10 | Oct 20, 1924 | Birmingham A.C., Birmingham, Alabama, U.S. | |

=== Unofficial record ===
| 156 fights | 119 wins | 24 losses |
|---|---|---|
| By knockout | 21 | 1 |
| By decision | 96 | 19 |
| By disqualification | 2 | 4 |
| Draws | 13 | |

Record with the inclusion of newspaper decisions in the win/loss/draw column.

| No. | Result | Record | Opponent | Type | Round | Date | Location | Notes |
|---|---|---|---|---|---|---|---|---|
| 156 | Loss | 119–24–13 | Sammy Angott | PTS | 10 | Jul 17, 1939 | Forbes Field, Pittsburgh, Pennsylvania, U.S. | |
| 155 | Win | 119–23–13 | Yucatán Kid | MD | 10 | Jun 15, 1939 | City Stadium, Richmond, Virginia, U.S. | |
| 154 | Win | 118–23–13 | Wishy Jones | NWS | 10 | Mar 30, 1939 | City Auditorium, Birmingham, Alabama, U.S. | |
| 153 | Win | 117–23–13 | Yucatán Kid | PTS | 10 | Dec 16, 1938 | Beach Arena, Miami Beach, Florida, U.S. | |
| 152 | Win | 116–23–13 | Mike Gamiere | PTS | 10 | Dec 5, 1938 | Arena, Cleveland, Ohio, U.S. | |
| 151 | Win | 115–23–13 | Yucatán Kid | PTS | 15 | Oct 3, 1938 | Griffith Stadium, Washington, D.C., U.S. | |
| 150 | Win | 114–23–13 | Lou Gevinson | PTS | 10 | May 20, 1938 | Griffith Stadium, Washington, D.C., U.S. | |
| 149 | Win | 113–23–13 | Joey Green | NWS | 10 | Apr 11, 1938 | American Legion Arena, Mobile, Alabama, U.S. | |
| 148 | Win | 112–23–13 | Joey Temmes | PTS | 10 | Mar 15, 1938 | Greenwood, Mississippi, U.S. | |
| 147 | Win | 111–23–13 | Bobby Britton | PTS | 10 | Feb 15, 1938 | Coliseum, Coral Gables, Florida, U.S. | |
| 146 | Win | 110–23–13 | Ray Ingram | PTS | 10 | Dec 20, 1937 | City Auditorium, Richmond, Virginia, U.S. | |
| 145 | Win | 109–23–13 | Carl Guggino | PTS | 10 | Dec 8, 1937 | Hippodrome, New York City, New York, U.S. | |
| 144 | Loss | 108–23–13 | Henry Armstrong | KO | 6 (15) | Oct 29, 1937 | Madison Square Garden, New York City, New York, U.S. | Lost NBA and The Ring featherweight titles; For vacant NYSAC featherweight titles |
| 143 | Win | 108–22–13 | Teddy Braun | PTS | 10 | Sep 9, 1937 | Old Drill Hall, Cape Town, Western Cape, South Africa | |
| 142 | Win | 107–22–13 | Freddie Miller | PTS | 12 | Sep 4, 1937 | Wanderers Stadium, Johannesburg, Gauteng, South Africa | Retained NBA and The Ring featherweight titles |
| 141 | Loss | 106–22–13 | Freddie Miller | PTS | 10 | Jul 31, 1937 | Wanderers Stadium, Johannesburg, Gauteng, South Africa | |
| 140 | Loss | 106–21–13 | Harry Mizler | DQ | 1 (10) | May 6, 1937 | Wanderers Stadium, Johannesburg, Gauteng, South Africa | Sarron struck Mizler a low blow in the first round of a scheduled ten-rounder and was disqualified |
| 139 | Loss | 106–20–13 | Dave Crowley | DQ | 9 (10) | May 6, 1937 | Harringay Arena, Harringay, London, England | Sarron DQ'd for hitting with an open glove after repeated warnings |
| 138 | Win | 106–19–13 | Harry Mizler | PTS | 10 | Apr 15, 1937 | Harringay Arena, Harringay, London, England | |
| 137 | Win | 105–19–13 | Andy Martin | KO | 5 (12) | Feb 27, 1937 | Wanderers Stadium, Johannesburg, Gauteng, South Africa | |
| 136 | Win | 104–19–13 | Lawrence Stevens | KO | 12 (12) | Jan 16, 1937 | Wanderers Stadium, Johannesburg, Gauteng, South Africa | |
| 135 | Draw | 103–19–13 | Nick Camarata | PTS | 10 | Sep 14, 1936 | City Stadium, Richmond, Virginia, U.S. | |
| 134 | Win | 103–19–12 | Jackie Carter | PTS | 10 | Aug 26, 1936 | Idora Park, Youngstown, Ohio, U.S. | |
| 133 | Win | 102–19–12 | Davey Abad | PTS | 10 | Jul 31, 1936 | Legion Stadium, Hollywood, California, U.S. | |
| 132 | Win | 101–19–12 | Baby Manuel | UD | 15 | Jul 22, 1936 | Sportatorium, Dallas, Texas, U.S. | Retained NBA and The Ring featherweight titles |
| 131 | Win | 100–19–12 | Bobby Dean | KO | 5 (10) | Jul 7, 1936 | Griffith Stadium, Washington, D.C., U.S. | |
| 130 | Win | 99–19–12 | Lloyd Pine | PTS | 10 | Jun 23, 1936 | League Park, Akron, Ohio, U.S. | |
| 129 | Win | 98–19–12 | Nick Camarata | PTS | 10 | Jun 15, 1936 | Jai Alai Fronton, Arabi, Louisiana, U.S. | |
| 128 | Win | 97–19–12 | Freddie Miller | MD | 15 | May 11, 1936 | Griffith Stadium, Washington, D.C., U.S. | Won NBA and The Ring featherweight titles |
| 127 | Loss | 96–19–12 | Freddie Miller | PTS | 15 | Mar 2, 1936 | Coliseum, Coral Gables, Florida, U.S. | For NBA and The Ring featherweight titles |
| 126 | Win | 96–18–12 | Carl Guggino | PTS | 10 | Jan 16, 1936 | Miami Stadium, Miami, Florida, U.S. | |
| 125 | Draw | 95–18–12 | Carl Guggino | PTS | 10 | Dec 5, 1935 | Cinderella Ballroom, Miami, Florida, U.S. | |
| 124 | Win | 95–18–11 | Jimmy McNamara | PTS | 10 | Nov 28, 1935 | Cinderella Ballroom, Miami, Florida, U.S. | |
| 123 | Win | 94–18–11 | Andy Martin | NWS | 10 | Nov 6, 1935 | City Auditorium, Birmingham, Alabama, U.S. | |
| 122 | Win | 93–18–11 | California Joe Rivers | PTS | 10 | Sep 30, 1935 | Griffith Stadium, Washington, D.C., U.S. | |
| 121 | Win | 92–18–11 | Young Chocolate | UD | 10 | Sep 14, 1935 | Rose Gardens Stadium, Kingston, Jamaica | |
| 120 | Win | 91–18–11 | Joey Temmes | PTS | 10 | Aug 12, 1935 | Griffith Stadium, Washington, D.C., U.S. | |
| 119 | Win | 90–18–11 | California Joe Rivers | PTS | 10 | Mar 25, 1935 | Auditorium, Washington, D.C., U.S. | |
| 118 | Win | 89–18–11 | Frankie Covelli | PTS | 10 | Mar 8, 1935 | Coliseum, Coral Gables, Florida, U.S. | |
| 117 | Win | 88–18–11 | Baby Manuel | PTS | 10 | Feb 25, 1935 | Beach Arena, Miami Beach, Florida, U.S. | |
| 116 | Win | 87–18–11 | Patsy Severo | PTS | 10 | Feb 18, 1935 | Cinderella Ballroom, Miami, Florida, U.S. | |
| 115 | Win | 86–18–11 | California Joe Rivers | PTS | 10 | Jan 28, 1935 | Auditorium, Washington, D.C., U.S. | |
| 114 | Win | 85–18–11 | Frankie Wallace | PTS | 10 | Oct 15, 1934 | Arena, Philadelphia, Pennsylvania, U.S. | |
| 113 | Win | 84–18–11 | Benny Bass | MD | 10 | Sep 24, 1934 | Arena, Philadelphia, Pennsylvania, U.S. | |
| 112 | Win | 83–18–11 | Benny Bass | DQ | 6 (10) | Aug 27, 1934 | Griffith Stadium, Washington, D.C., U.S. | |
| 111 | Win | 82–18–11 | Al Foreman | SD | 10 | Jun 29, 1934 | Griffith Stadium, Washington, D.C., U.S. | |
| 110 | Loss | 81–18–11 | Lew Feldman | PTS | 8 | May 11, 1934 | Madison Square Garden, New York City, New York, U.S. | |
| 109 | Win | 81–17–11 | Ray Schneider | PTS | 10 | Mar 27, 1934 | Duval County Armory, Jacksonville, Florida, U.S. | |
| 108 | Win | 80–17–11 | Bucky Burton | PTS | 12 | Mar 12, 1934 | Biscayne Arena, Miami, Florida, U.S. | |
| 107 | Loss | 79–17–11 | Bucky Burton | SD | 10 | Feb 19, 1934 | Biscayne Arena, Miami, Florida, U.S. | |
| 106 | Loss | 79–16–11 | Freddie Miller | PTS | 10 | Feb 7, 1934 | Music Hall Arena, Cincinnati, Ohio, U.S. | |
| 105 | Loss | 79–15–11 | Frankie Covelli | PTS | 10 | Jan 23, 1934 | Portner's Arena, Alexandria, Virginia, U.S. | |
| 104 | Win | 79–14–11 | Bucky Burton | PTS | 10 | Dec 11, 1933 | Biscayne Arena, Miami, Florida, U.S. | |
| 103 | Win | 78–14–11 | Varias Milling | PTS | 10 | Nov 28, 1933 | Portner's Arena, Alexandria, Virginia, U.S. | |
| 102 | Loss | 77–14–11 | Freddie Miller | UD | 10 | Nov 1, 1933 | Portner's Arena, Alexandria, Virginia, U.S. | |
| 101 | Win | 77–13–11 | Eddie Burl | PTS | 10 | Oct 17, 1933 | Portner's Arena, Alexandria, Virginia, U.S. | |
| 100 | Win | 76–13–11 | Mickey Genaro | PTS | 10 | Sep 20, 1933 | Twin City Arena, Laurel, Maryland, U.S. | |
| 99 | Draw | 75–13–11 | Eddie Burl | PTS | 10 | Aug 15, 1933 | Twin City Arena, Laurel, Maryland, U.S. | |
| 98 | Loss | 75–13–10 | Eddie Burl | PTS | 10 | Jul 18, 1933 | Twin City Arena, Laurel, Maryland, U.S. | |
| 97 | Win | 75–12–10 | Johnny Farr | PTS | 8 | Jun 6, 1933 | Portner's Arena, Alexandria, Virginia, U.S. | |
| 96 | Win | 74–12–10 | Johnny Datto | NWS | 10 | Jun 1, 1933 | City Auditorium, Birmingham, Alabama, U.S. | |
| 95 | Win | 73–12–10 | Johnny Datto | TKO | 1 (10) | May 12, 1933 | Northside Arena, Pittsburgh, Pennsylvania, U.S. | |
| 94 | Draw | 72–12–10 | Tommy Paul | PTS | 10 | May 9, 1933 | Portner's Arena, Alexandria, Virginia, U.S. | |
| 93 | Draw | 72–12–9 | Tommy Paul | MD | 8 | Apr 25, 1933 | Portner's Arena, Alexandria, Virginia, U.S. | |
| 92 | Win | 72–12–8 | Miki Gelb | PTS | 8 | Mar 28, 1933 | Portner's Arena, Alexandria, Virginia, U.S. | |
| 91 | Win | 71–12–8 | Benny Schwartz | KO | 7 (8) | Mar 7, 1933 | Portner's Arena, Alexandria, Virginia, U.S. | |
| 90 | Win | 70–12–8 | Frankie DeAngelo | TKO | 7 (8) | Feb 14, 1933 | Portner's Arena, Alexandria, Virginia, U.S. | |
| 89 | Draw | 69–12–8 | Charley Van Reedon | PTS | 10 | Jan 25, 1933 | Duval County Armory, Jacksonville, Florida, U.S. | |
| 88 | Loss | 69–12–7 | Harry Sankey | PTS | 10 | Apr 29, 1932 | Arena, New Haven, Connecticut, U.S. | |
| 87 | Loss | 69–11–7 | Fidel LaBarba | PTS | 10 | Apr 22, 1932 | Olympia Stadium, Detroit, Michigan, U.S. | |
| 86 | Win | 69–10–7 | Chico Cisneros | PTS | 10 | Mar 24, 1932 | Cinderella Ballroom, Miami, Florida, U.S. | |
| 85 | Draw | 68–10–7 | Chico Cisneros | PTS | 10 | Feb 25, 1932 | Biscayne Arena, Miami, Florida, U.S. | |
| 84 | Win | 68–10–6 | Charley Van Reedon | KO | 1 (10) | Feb 11, 1932 | Cinderella Ballroom, Miami, Florida, U.S. | |
| 83 | Win | 67–10–6 | Mickey Genaro | UD | 10 | Jan 19, 1932 | Duval County Armory, Jacksonville, Florida, U.S. | |
| 82 | Win | 66–10–6 | Gilbert Castillo | PTS | 10 | Nov 26, 1931 | Cinderella Ballroom, Miami, Florida, U.S. | |
| 81 | Win | 65–10–6 | Charley Van Reedon | PTS | 10 | Nov 17, 1931 | Armory, Jacksonville, Florida, U.S. | |
| 80 | Win | 64–10–6 | Midget Mike O'Dowd | TKO | 3 (10) | Nov 9, 1931 | City Auditorium, Birmingham, Alabama, U.S. | |
| 79 | Win | 63–10–6 | Eddie Burl | PTS | 10 | Nov 4, 1931 | Armory, Jacksonville, Florida, U.S. | |
| 78 | Win | 62–10–6 | Gilbert Castillo | PTS | 10 | Jul 24, 1931 | Cinderella Ballroom, Miami, Florida, U.S. | |
| 77 | Win | 61–10–6 | Gilbert Castillo | PTS | 10 | Jul 10, 1931 | Cinderella Ballroom, Miami, Florida, U.S. | |
| 76 | Draw | 60–10–6 | Midget Mike O'Dowd | PTS | 8 | Jul 4, 1931 | American Legion Stadium, Greenwood, Mississippi, U.S. | |
| 75 | Win | 60–10–5 | Babe Ruth | PTS | 10 | Jun 11, 1931 | American Legion Stadium, Greenwood, Mississippi, U.S. | |
| 74 | Win | 59–10–5 | Davey Abad | NWS | 10 | Jun 8, 1931 | City Auditorium, Birmingham, Alabama, U.S. | |
| 73 | Win | 58–10–5 | Mickey Genaro | NWS | 10 | Apr 27, 1931 | City Auditorium, Birmingham, Alabama, U.S. | |
| 72 | Win | 57–10–5 | Tony Leto | KO | 4 (10) | Mar 16, 1931 | City Auditorium, Birmingham, Alabama, U.S. | |
| 71 | Win | 56–10–5 | Emil Paluso | NWS | 10 | Feb 2, 1931 | City Auditorium, Birmingham, Alabama, U.S. | |
| 70 | Win | 55–10–5 | Johnnie Leckie | PTS | 15 | Aug 5, 1930 | Opera House, Palmerston North, New Zealand | |
| 69 | Win | 54–10–5 | Sammy Shack | PTS | 15 | Jun 21, 1930 | Kensington Drill Hall, Dunedin, New Zealand | |
| 68 | Loss | 53–10–5 | Tommy Donovan | PTS | 15 | May 3, 1930 | Speedway Stadium, Dunedin, New Zealand | |
| 67 | Loss | 53–9–5 | Tommy Donovan | PTS | 15 | Mar 29, 1930 | Kilbirnie Stadium, Wellington, New Zealand | |
| 66 | Loss | 53–8–5 | Tommy Donovan | DQ | 7 (15) | Mar 15, 1930 | Western Park, New Plymouth, New Zealand | |
| 65 | Win | 53–7–5 | Johnnie Leckie | PTS | 15 | Feb 4, 1930 | Town Hall, Wellington, New Zealand | |
| 64 | Win | 52–7–5 | Johnnie Leckie | PTS | 15 | Jan 1, 1930 | Municipal Theatre, Napier, New Zealand | |
| 63 | Win | 51–7–5 | Billy Grime | TKO | 14 (15) | Dec 27, 1929 | Town Hall, Auckland, New Zealand | |
| 62 | Win | 50–7–5 | Billy Grime | TKO | 14 (15) | Dec 17, 1929 | Town Hall, Wellington, New Zealand | |
| 61 | Win | 49–7–5 | Jack Jones | TKO | 11 (15) | Dec 2, 1929 | Town Hall, Wellington, New Zealand | |
| 60 | Win | 48–7–5 | Billy Grime | PTS | 15 | Nov 8, 1929 | Brisbane Stadium, Brisbane, Queensland, Australia | |
| 59 | Win | 47–7–5 | Billy Grime | RTD | 9 (15) | Oct 12, 1929 | Sydney Stadium, Sydney, New South Wales, Australia | |
| 58 | Loss | 46–7–5 | Billy Grime | PTS | 15 | Sep 7, 1929 | Sydney Stadium, Sydney, New South Wales, Australia | |
| 57 | Draw | 46–6–5 | Dick Corbett | PTS | 15 | Aug 14, 1929 | Brisbane Stadium, Brisbane, Queensland, Australia | |
| 56 | Win | 46–6–4 | Johnnie Leckie | KO | 13 (15) | Jul 27, 1929 | Sydney Stadium, Sydney, New South Wales, Australia | |
| 55 | Win | 45–6–4 | Young Siki | PTS | 15 | Jul 20, 1929 | West Melbourne Stadium, Melbourne, Victoria, Australia | |
| 54 | Loss | 44–6–4 | Johnnie Leckie | PTS | 15 | Jun 22, 1929 | Sydney Stadium, Sydney, New South Wales, Australia | |
| 53 | Win | 44–5–4 | Pinky Silverberg | PTS | 15 | May 25, 1929 | West Melbourne Stadium, Melbourne, Victoria, Australia | |
| 52 | Win | 43–5–4 | Charlie Glasson | KO | 5 (15) | May 11, 1929 | West Melbourne Stadium, Melbourne, Victoria, Australia | |
| 51 | Loss | 42–5–4 | Mickey Gill | PTS | 10 | Mar 6, 1929 | Hot Springs, Arkansas, U.S. | |
| 50 | Win | 42–4–4 | Johnny Erickson | NWS | 6 | Jan 18, 1929 | Coliseum, Chicago, Illinois, U.S. | |
| 49 | Win | 41–4–4 | Emil Paluso | NWS | 10 | Dec 3, 1928 | Birmingham A.C., Birmingham, Alabama, U.S. | |
| 48 | Win | 40–4–4 | Jimmy McDermott | PTS | 10 | Nov 1, 1928 | American Legion Stadium, Greenwood, Mississippi, U.S. | |
| 47 | Win | 39–4–4 | Harry Forbes | PTS | 10 | Oct 18, 1928 | American Legion Stadium, Greenwood, Mississippi, U.S. | |
| 46 | Win | 38–4–4 | Benny Schwartz | NWS | 10 | Oct 9, 1928 | City Auditorium, Birmingham, Alabama, U.S. | |
| 45 | Loss | 37–4–4 | Emil Paluso | PTS | 10 | Sep 21, 1928 | Coliseum Arena, New Orleans, Louisiana, U.S. | |
| 44 | Win | 37–3–4 | Kid Pancho | PTS | 12 | Sep 7, 1928 | Market Square Garden, Oklahoma City, Oklahoma, U.S. | |
| 43 | Win | 36–3–4 | Mike Sansone | PTS | 10 | Aug 23, 1928 | American Legion Stadium, Greenwood, Mississippi, U.S. | |
| 42 | Win | 35–3–4 | Mike Sansone | PTS | 10 | Aug 2, 1928 | American Legion Stadium, Greenwood, Mississippi, U.S. | |
| 41 | Win | 34–3–4 | Kid Pancho | PTS | 10 | Jul 9, 1928 | Market Square Garden, Oklahoma City, Oklahoma, U.S. | |
| 40 | Win | 33–3–4 | Joe Lucas | NWS | 10 | Jun 4, 1928 | Birmingham A.C., Birmingham, Alabama, U.S. | |
| 39 | Win | 32–3–4 | Quina Lee | KO | 8 (10) | May 21, 1928 | Birmingham A.C., Birmingham, Alabama, U.S. | |
| 38 | Win | 31–3–4 | Mickey Gill | PTS | 8 | Apr 9, 1928 | Memphis, Tennessee, U.S. | |
| 37 | Win | 30–3–4 | Joe Lucas | PTS | 10 | Apr 3, 1928 | Savannah, Georgia, U.S. | |
| 36 | Win | 29–3–4 | Jackie Daley | NWS | 10 | Mar 26, 1928 | Birmingham A.C., Birmingham, Alabama, U.S. | |
| 35 | Win | 28–3–4 | Pinky May | NWS | 10 | Feb 27, 1928 | Birmingham A.C., Birmingham, Alabama, U.S. | |
| 34 | Win | 27–3–4 | Dudley Stadler | TKO | 6 (12) | Feb 19, 1928 | Hi-Way Park, Gretna, Louisiana, U.S. | |
| 33 | Draw | 26–3–4 | Pinky May | PTS | 10 | Jan 26, 1928 | Savannah, Georgia, U.S. | |
| 32 | Win | 26–3–3 | Steve Stetson | KO | 2 (10) | Jan 16, 1928 | City Auditorium, Birmingham, Alabama, U.S. | |
| 31 | Win | 25–3–3 | Bobby Binckley | PTS | 10 | Dec 15, 1927 | Memphis, Tennessee, U.S. | |
| 30 | Win | 24–3–3 | Johnny Franks | PTS | 8 | Nov 28, 1927 | Memphis Stadium, Memphis, Tennessee, U.S. | |
| 29 | Win | 23–3–3 | Steve Stetson | NWS | 10 | Nov 21, 1927 | Birmingham A.C., Birmingham, Alabama, U.S. | |
| 28 | Win | 22–3–3 | Leroy Dougan | PTS | 8 | Oct 31, 1927 | Memphis Stadium, Memphis, Tennessee, U.S. | |
| 27 | Win | 21–3–3 | Memphis Pal Moore | PTS | 8 | Oct 17, 1927 | Memphis Stadium, Memphis, Tennessee, U.S. | |
| 26 | Win | 20–3–3 | Bud Harris | KO | 4 (10) | Oct 3, 1927 | Birmingham A.C., Birmingham, Alabama, U.S. | |
| 25 | Win | 19–3–3 | Tony Leto | DQ | 3 (10) | Sep 12, 1927 | Miami Field, Miami, Florida, U.S. | Leto was disqualified for punching low |
| 24 | Win | 18–3–3 | Tony Leto | PTS | 10 | Aug 22, 1927 | Miami Field, Miami, Florida, U.S. | |
| 23 | Win | 17–3–3 | Benny Regan | NWS | 10 | Aug 4, 1927 | Stalllworth Casino, Tuscaloosa, Alabama, U.S. | |
| 22 | Win | 16–3–3 | Memphis Pal Moore | NWS | 10 | Aug 1, 1927 | Birmingham A.C., Birmingham, Alabama, U.S. | |
| 21 | Win | 15–3–3 | Leroy Dougan | NWS | 10 | Jul 18, 1927 | Birmingham A.C., Birmingham, Alabama, U.S. | |
| 20 | Win | 14–3–3 | Benny Regan | PTS | 10 | Jul 4, 1927 | Ponce de Leon Ballpark, Atlanta, Georgia, U.S. | |
| 19 | Win | 13–3–3 | Benny Regan | PTS | 10 | May 16, 1927 | Birmingham A.C., Birmingham, Alabama, U.S. | |
| 18 | Win | 12–3–3 | Bud Harris | PTS | 10 | Apr 25, 1927 | Masonic Temple, Birmingham, Alabama, U.S. | |
| 17 | Win | 11–3–3 | Leroy Jordan | KO | 3 (10) | Apr 11, 1927 | Birmingham A.C., Birmingham, Alabama, U.S. | |
| 16 | Win | 10–3–3 | Tommy Williams | PTS | 6 | Apr 2, 1927 | Race Track Arena, Pompano Beach, Florida, U.S. | |
| 15 | Win | 9–3–3 | Happy Atherton | MD | 10 | Mar 18, 1927 | Legion Arena, Lake Worth, Florida, U.S. | |
| 14 | Draw | 8–3–3 | Tony Leto | PTS | 10 | Dec 23, 1926 | Miami Field, Miami, Florida, U.S. | |
| 13 | Win | 8–3–2 | Johnny Moore | PTS | 10 | Dec 9, 1926 | Miami Field, Miami, Florida, U.S. | |
| 12 | Win | 7–3–2 | Harry Allen | PTS | 10 | Oct 28, 1926 | Miami Field, Miami, Florida, U.S. | |
| 11 | Loss | 6–3–2 | Genaro Pino | PTS | 10 | Sep 9, 1926 | Miami Field, Miami, Florida, U.S. | |
| 10 | Draw | 6–2–2 | Genaro Pino | PTS | 10 | Aug 26, 1926 | Miami Field, Miami, Florida, U.S. | |
| 9 | Win | 6–2–1 | Mutt Griffin | NWS | 10 | Jul 29, 1926 | Miami Field, Miami, Florida, U.S. | |
| 8 | Draw | 5–2–1 | Mickey Gill | NWS | 10 | Nov 23, 1925 | Miami Field, Miami, Florida, U.S. | |
| 7 | Loss | 5–2 | Mickey Gill | NWS | 10 | Nov 2, 1925 | Miami Field, Miami, Florida, U.S. | |
| 6 | Win | 5–1 | Battling Dick Bowden | KO | 1 (10) | Oct 26, 1925 | Miami Field, Miami, Florida, U.S. | |
| 5 | Loss | 4–1 | Red Keenan | DQ | 6 (10) | Sep 7, 1925 | Biscayne Stadium, Miami, Florida, U.S. | |
| 4 | Win | 4–0 | Billy Cecil | NWS | 8 | Feb 13, 1925 | Stansanco A.C., Louisville, Kentucky, U.S. | |
| 3 | Win | 3–0 | Red Burke | PTS | 10 | Dec 3, 1924 | Birmingham A.C., Birmingham, Alabama, U.S. | |
| 2 | Win | 2–0 | Dude Gustin | PTS | 8 | Dec 2, 1924 | Gulf State Steel YMCA, Gadsden, Alabama, U.S. | |
| 1 | Win | 1–0 | Red Burke | PTS | 10 | Oct 20, 1924 | Birmingham A.C., Birmingham, Alabama, U.S. | |

== See also ==
- List of featherweight boxing champions
