= PT =

PT, Pt, or pt may refer to:

== Arts and entertainment ==
- P.T. (Silent Hills), initialism for "playable teaser", a short video game released to promote the cancelled video game Silent Hills
- Porcupine Tree, a British progressive rock group

== In business ==
=== Businesses ===
- Capital Cargo International Airlines (IATA airline designator PT)
- West Air Sweden (IATA airline designator PT)
- Putnam Transit, a bus system that serves Putnam County, New York
- Portugal Telecom, the largest telecommunications service provider in Portugal
- Piteå-Tidningen, a Swedish local newspaper

=== Business terminology ===
- Part-time job
- Perseroan Terbatas, the Indonesian name for a limited liability company

== Political parties ==
- Partido dos Trabalhadores (Brazil) (Workers' Party), a Brazilian political party
- Parti des travailleurs (France) (Workers' Party), a defunct French political party
- Partido dos Trabalhadores (Guinea-Bissau) (Workers' Party), a Bissau-Guinean political party
- Partido del Trabajo (Mexico) (Labor Party), a Mexican political party

== Places ==
- Promontory or point, a prominent mass of land that overlooks lower-lying land or a body of water

=== Specific places ===
- Portugal (ISO country code PT)
  - .pt, an Internet top-level domain name for Portugal
  - Portuguese language (ISO 639 alpha-2 code "pt")
- Palestinian territories, comprise the West Bank (including East Jerusalem) and the Gaza Strip
- Pistoia, a city in Italy
- Port Townsend, Washington, a city in Jefferson County, Washington, in the United States
- Pacific Time Zone, a time zone 7 hours behind UTC during most of the year (8 hours behind from early November to mid-March)

== Science, technology, and mathematics ==
=== Biology and medicine ===
- pt, patient, a medical abbreviation
- Physical therapy/Physiotherapy or Physical therapist/Physiotherapist
- Pararosaniline, Toluidine histological stain
- Percutaneous surgery
- Pertussis toxin, a protein-based exotoxin which causes whooping cough
- Petunidin, an anthocyanidin plant pigment
- Prothrombin time, a measurement of blood coagulation
- Pump thrombosis, a major device malfunction due to a suspected or confirmed development of a pump thrombus

=== Computing ===
- .pt, an Internet top-level domain name for Portugal
- Plain text, data consisting in unformatted characters
- Panorama Tools, a suite of programs and libraries originally by Helmut Dersch
- Pluggable Transport, an API in the Tor Project
- Penetration testing, checking to see how secure a computer system is

=== Physics and chemistry ===
- Platinum, symbol Pt, a chemical element
- Polythiophene, a molecule
- Total pressure (P_{t}), in fluid dynamics

=== Transportation ===
- A US Navy hull classification symbol: Patrol torpedo boat (PT)
- Public transport, or public transit
- Chrysler PT Cruiser, a car model
- PT-91, a military tank

=== Units of measurement ===
- Percentage point (pt), a unit for the arithmetic difference of two percentages
- pt, a measurement in the print industry for thickness of card stock
- Pint (Pt.), a unit of volume or capacity
- Point (typography) (Pt.), a unit of measure used in typography

=== Other uses in science, technology, and mathematics ===
- Permian-Triassic extinction event, a mass extinction between the Paleozoic and Mesozoic eras
- Peat, in the Unified Soil Classification System
- Post-tensioned concrete, a reinforcement method in structural engineering
- Potential transformer, an electrical component for changing voltage
- Pressure treated wood

== Sport ==
- Personal trainer, in fitness and bodybuilding
- Pro Tour (disambiguation)

== Physical fitness ==
- Physical education, known in many Commonwealth countries as physical training or PT
- Physical training instructor, in the British & Commonwealth military; also in the British police
- Physical fitness § PT, physical training

== Other uses ==
- Portuguese language (ISO 639-1: pt; endonym: português)
- Pandit, a Hindu honorific applied to certain scholars of law, religion, philosophy or music
- Perpetual traveler or "permanent tourist"
- Perspectives on Terrorism, an academic journal
- Pro tempore, a Latin phrase "for the time being" (temporary)
- Pyramid Texts, an ancient Egyptian funerary text
- Processo transexualizador, a term for gender transition health care in Brazil
- Central Papua (vehicle registration prefix PT)

== See also ==
- P. T. (disambiguation)
- Petey (disambiguation)
- Abbreviation of Pumper Tanker in Fire Rescue Victoria
