= Al Foreman =

English/Canadian boxer (1904–1954)

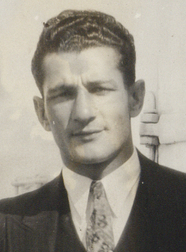

Personal information
- Nickname: Bert "Kid" Harris
- Nationality: English/Canadian (Canada)
- Born: Albert Foreman; 3 November 1904 London, England
- Died: 23 December 1954 (aged 50) Montreal, Quebec, Canada
- Height: 5 ft 5 in (1.65 m)
- Weight: featherweight junior lightweight lightweight

Boxing career

Boxing record
- Total fights: 146
- Wins: 112 (KO 71)
- Losses: 22 (KO 3)
- Draws: 12
- No contests: 0

Al Foreman (3 November 1904 in London – 23 December 1954), was a British-born boxer of the 1910s, 1920s and 1930s who in the last four years of his career won the Canadian lightweight title, British Boxing Board of Control (BBBofC) British lightweight title, and British Empire lightweight title. He unsuccessfully contended for the Canadian Featherweight title against Leo Roy in Montreal on 8 May 1924.

He first took the Canadian Lightweight title against Leo "Kid" Roy in 1928, and took the BBBofC British Lightweight Title on 21 February 1930, in a first-round knockout of reigning champion Fred Webster in the Whitechapel District of London. He was very durable boxer, fighting in 144 bouts and losing by knockout only three times while knocking out his opponents in 71 of his 112 bouts.

His professional fighting weight varied from 125 lb (57 kg; 8 st 13 lb), to 136 lb (61.7 kg; 9 st 10.0 lb). Foreman was managed by his brothers, Maurice and Harry.

== Early life and career ==
Albert Foreman was born in London, England on 3 November 1904.

He was orphaned at four years of age, and for ten years lived in an orphanage, the Hayes School for Jewish Boys in Middlesex on the outskirts of London. At fourteen, he ran away from the orphanage and attempted to join the Army in the midst of WWI. Too young for combat, the Army allowed him to join the famous Black Watch infantry regiment in a non-combat role as a drummer boy, after he obtained his orphanage's permission. When the war immediately ended, Foreman was reassigned to occupation duty in Germany. He began boxing for the British Army with considerable success.

In his early career he scored an impressive record of 40 wins, 12 losses, and 7 draws, with 30 wins by knockout. During his early career in England, he often fought under the name Bert "Kid" Harris.

In 1924, Foreman moved to Canada from Great Britain, where in time he gained citizenship. He lived intermittently in Montreal during the next ten years of his boxing career, but settled there after his retirement from boxing in 1934. His years of boxing in the United States allowed him to hone his skills against some of the greatest boxers of the era.

=== Boxing for the US Army ===
Around late 1924–26, Foreman fought for the United States Army during a two-year hitch, eventually winning the Army, Navy, and Marine Corps Featherweight Championship. During this period, though continuing to fight professionally, he fought exclusively in the United States, boxing several matches at Fort Myers in Virginia where he was probably stationed, and the Barracks in Washington, D. C. While boxing for the Army, he amassed an impressive record of wins with a high percentage of knockouts. Foreman remained boxing in the United States roughly through 1928.

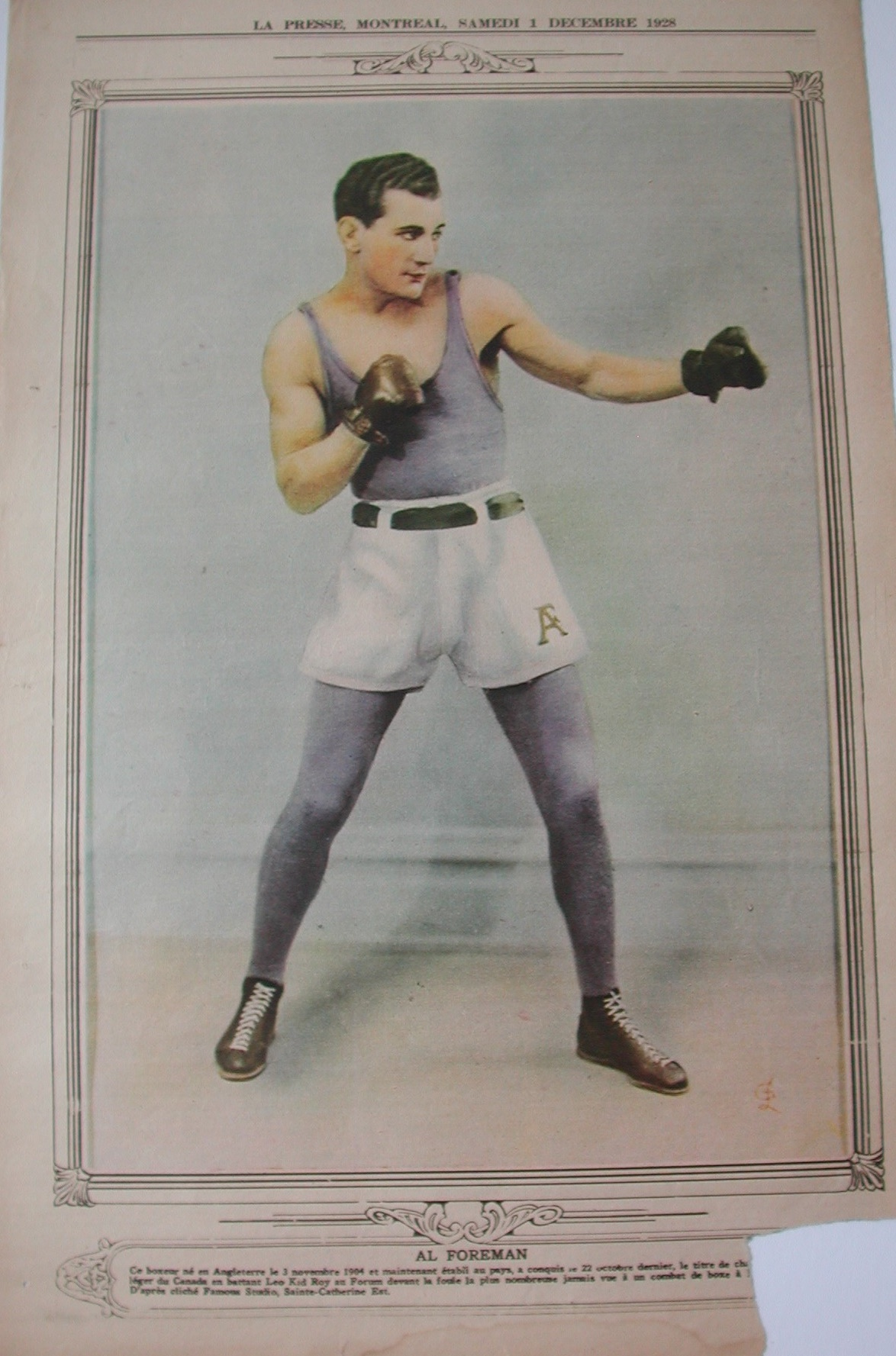

Showing strong punching throughout the fight on 1 January 1927, Foreman defeated Carl Tremaine in Philadelphia in a ninth round disqualification. For the first nine rounds, Foreman had the best of the battle, finally winning the decision when Tremaine struck low, despite the referee's prior warnings to raise his punching. Tremaine was saved from a knockout in the third round only by the closing bell, when Foreman tagged him with a right cross that buckled his knees. The win focused more attention on Foreman as a likely candidate for the featherweight or junior lightweight title.

On 24 January 1927, released from his Army service, Foreman faced former world junior-lightweight champion Mike Ballerino at the arena in Philadelphia, Pennsylvania, impressively winning the close bout in a ten-round points decision. Foreman fought the bout at only 126, as a featherweight, against a heavier 133 pound lightweight Ballerino. Foreman used his right repeatedly on Ballerino, who with an effective defense withstood the blows of his opponent, but noticeably showed the effects of Foreman's punches in the first round. Ballerino fought cautiously until the tenth, when letting down his guard, he was again staggered by the blows of Foreman.

=== "Kid" Kaplan, May 1927 ===
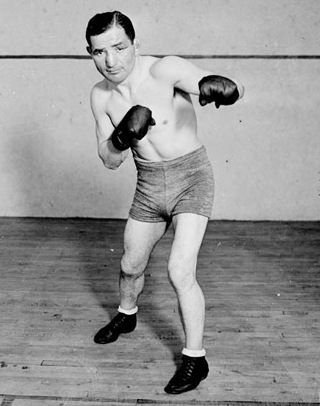
Louis "Kid" Kaplan

On 9 May 1927, he lost to former Featherweight World Champion, Louis "Kid" Kaplan in a ten-round points decision at the Arena in Philadelphia. Foreman was decisively beaten by his skilled Jewish opponent who "chased the Washington lad all over the ring for the entire ten rounds". Foreman still received a number of well placed punches and had difficulty finishing the bout. In the eyes of many, the loss reduced Foreman's chances of taking a Lightweight or Junior Lightweight World Title.

He lost to future Junior Welterweight Champion Johnny Jadick on 21 May 1928, in an eight-round points decision at the Polo Grounds in New York. One of Foreman's better known opponents, Jadick would take the World Jr. Welterweight Championship on 18 July 1932, against the incomparable Tony Canzoneri.

Foreman earned the right to challenge Kid Roy for the British lightweight title by defeating French boxer George Chabot on 10 October 1928, in a decisive fourth round knockout in Montreal.

== Canadian Lightweight Champion, 1928 ==
Foreman first took the Canadian Lightweight title on 22 October 1928, against Leo "Kid" Roy in a second-round TKO. In a decisive victory, Foreman floored Roy four times before a crowd of 4,000 at the Forum in Montreal. The Globe of Toronto disputed Foreman's claim to the title as he had fought in the United States, and served in the US military as a boxer for a two-year enlistment. He had, however lived in Montreal for a portion of the last four years, and had obtained Canadian citizenship.

While Canadian champion, Foreman drew with top lightweight contender Phil McGraw on 26 June 1929 in an important ten round decision in Montreal. Shortly before the bout, McGraw correctly predicted that Foreman would not knock him out, and that the fight would go the full ten rounds.

=== Johnny Dundee, 1929 ===
On 25 September 1929, Foreman defeated former Featherweight and Jr. Lightweight Champion Johnny Dundee in a tenth-round TKO at the Forum in Montreal. Both boxers weighed in at the lower end of the lightweight scale near 130. Foreman knocked down Dundee five times in the tenth before the referee stopped the fight. Foreman led on points going into the tenth round, but Dundee skilled defense kept him in the fight up until the end when Foreman unleashed a terrific flurry of rights, lefts, and body blows on Dundee.

=== Lightweight title loss, 1929 ===
On 13 December 1929, Foreman lost the Canadian Lightweight Title to Billy Townsend at the Arena in Vancouver before 3,000 fans, in a twelve-round mixed decision. There were no knockdowns in the close bout. The home boxer Townsend of Vancouver, the "Blond Tiger", used a darting left jab to the face and solid rights to the head and body effectively throughout the bout. Townsend took a commanding seven rounds, while Foreman had a decided edge in the fifth and a slight advantage in the sixth with three rounds even. Townsend appeared to have an advantage in the long range fighting and tied up Foreman effectively in the clinches. Halfway through the second, Townsend unleashed a series of blows that gained him the round. Foreman's aggression in the fifth won him the round.

Working up to another shot at, Foreman defeated Pete Zivic on 18 July 1930 at the Coliseum in Toronto in a third round disqualification. Zivic was overwhelmed by the punches he received in the early rounds and the referee disqualified him when he would not come out of defensive clinching in the third.

== British Light. champion 1930 ==
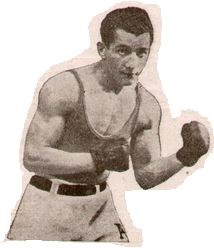
Foreman, 1930

Foreman first took the British (BBOC) and Commonwealth British Empire Lightweight Title on 21 May 1930, defeating Fred Webster at Premierland in London in a stunning Technical Knockout that occurred only 1:05 into the first round. The decisive win was likely the greatest achievement of Foreman's early boxing career. The final blow was a smashing uppercut to the jaw that put Webster down for the final count.

As a 129 featherweight, nearing the lightweight limit, on 30 July 1930, he met French boxer Maurice Holtzer in Montreal in a non-title bout, winning in a ten-round points decision. Holtzer would take both the French and European Featherweight Championships during his career. In a difficult and painful match, Holtzer struck Foreman low as many as seven times, and was repeatedly warned for the infraction by the referee. Holtzer fared best in the ninth and tenth as Foreman tired, but in much of the bout, Foreman forced the fighting, and chased an elusive opponent whose best defence was a frequent crouch or block with his gloves.

=== British Light. defenses ===
Foreman over Rose With Londsdale belt

Foreman defended his British and British Empire Lightweight Title against George Rose at Kings Hall in Manchester, England in a classic sixth-round knockout on 20 October 1930. Rose may have had the edge in the first two rounds, but Foreman's greater stamina and stronger punching turned the tide near the end of the fifth when he unleashed a flurry of blows that put Rose on the mat in a bad way. In the opening of the sixth, following a feint to the body, Foreman followed quickly with a crushing right to the head and left uppercut that sent Rose to the mat for the full count, ending the bout with a knockout. It was the first time a contest for the Lonsdale Belt had been staged outside of London.

On 17 March 1932, Foreman had a rare loss to Nel Tarleton in a twelve-round points decision at the Anfield Football Ground in Liverpool. Tarleton was the reigning British Featherweight Champion at the time, and Foreman was rated in the top two of lightweight contenders in the world, according to most standings. Foreman weighed 135, giving him a six-pound advantage over Tarleton.

Foreman briefly lost his British Empire lightweight title on 24 April 1933 against Jimmy Kelso in a fifteen round points decision in Sydney Stadium in Sydney, Australia.

== Regaining English, Canadian titles ==
Foreman defeated Jimmy Kelso in a British Empire Lightweight Title match in a third round disqualification, at Sydney Stadium in Sydney, Australia on 22 May 1933. This was the match which gave Foreman his second valid claim to the British Empire lightweight championship, though few American newspapers covered the story. Kelso had taken the Australian lightweight title in April of that year. Taking the British Empire Lightweight Title was the greatest achievement of Foreman's boxing career.

On 19 September 1933, Foreman regained the Canadian Lightweight Championship as well as defending his Commonwealth of the British Empire Lightweight Championship, beating Tommy Bland in a ten-round mixed decision before a crowd of 5,000 at the Mount Royal Arena in his Canadian hometown, Montreal. Foreman won the bout with hard blows to the body and head of Bland, though the youthful Bland withstood the punishment. In the close bout, two judges voted for Foreman, while one voted a draw. Foreman mounted a strong right hand offensive and a careful and deliberate style against the two handed attack of Bland. Foreman had been away from Canada fighting in England, and had formerly lost the title to Billy Townsend in Vancouver on 13 December 1929.

== Life after boxing ==
Foreman's lost his last bout against Petey Sarron at Griffith Stadium in Washington, D.C., on 29 June 1934, in a ten-round split decision. By one account, Foreman's subsequent boxing retirement was due to his concern over blurred vision he had obtained during his career.

After his last fight, Foreman worked for the Montreal Standard, Canada's largest weekly newspaper, gaining recognition as an outstanding photojournalist. He acted as a boxing promoter as well, working often at the Montreal Forum.

He joined the Royal Air Force at the outbreak of WWII, receiving a Distinguished Flying Cross for flying 37 missions during the war. His unit, the "Dam Busters" bombed dams on the Ruhr as well as the Moline Dam, and executed a raid on Hitler's Eagle's Nest. On one mission, the turret gun he operated was badly damaged by flak and he was left injured hanging from the plane's fuselage.

After his service in WWII, he returned to photography and opened his own portrait studio in Montreal. Late in life he worked as a voluntary physical instructor at a YMHA in Montreal.

In 1954, he died in a Montreal hospital sixteen days after a second heart attack. He was 50.

== Selected fights ==
9 Wins, 2 Losses, 1 draw
Result	Opponent(s)	Date	Location	Duration	Notes
Win	George Chabot	10 Oct 1928	Montreal	4 Round KO	
Win	Leo "Kid" Roy	22 Oct 1928	Montreal	2 Round TKO	Won Canad. light. Title
Win	Sylvia Mireault	21 Aug 1929	Montreal	10 Rounds	Kept Canad. light. Title
Win	Johnny Dundee	25 Sep 1929	Montreal	10 Rounds, TKO	Former Feather and Jr. Light Champ
Win	Fred Webster	21 May 1930	White Chapel	1st Round KO	Won Brit. Emp. and Brit. light titles
Win	Maurice Holtzer	30 July 1930	Montreal	10 Rounds	Future Europ. Feather Title holder
Win	George Rose	20 Oct 1930	Manchester	6th Round KO	Kept Brit. Emp. and Brit. light titles
Draw	Johnny Cuthbert	18 Nov 1949	Kensington	15 Rounds	Kept Brit. Emp. and Brit. light titles
Loss	Jimmy Kelso	24 Apr 1933	Sydney, AUS	15 Rounds	Lost Brit. Emp. light title
Win	Jimmy Kelso	22 May 1933	Sydney, AUS	3rd Round DQ	Regained Brit. Emp. light title
Win	Tommy Bland	19 Sep 1933	Montreal	10 Rounds	Kept Brit. Emp. light title Regained Can.light title
Loss	Petey Sarron	29 June 1934	Washington, DC	10 Rounds	Non-title with future world champ.
