= Hwang Eul-su =

Japanese boxer

Personal information
- Full name: Hwang Eul-su
- Nationality: Japan→South Korea→North Korea
- Born: Cheolweon, Kōgen-dō, Korea, Empire of Japan

Sport
- Sport: Boxing

Hwang Eul-su was a Korean boxer. He competed in the men's lightweight event at the 1932 Summer Olympics representing Japan using the name Otsu Shuko, misspelling of Otsushu Ko, an alternative pronunciation of Otsuhide Ō, the Japanese pronunciation of his Hanja name 黃乙秀.
