= Lawrence Stevens (boxer) =

South African boxer

Medal record

Men's Boxing

Representing South Africa

Olympic Games
Gold medal – first place	1932 Los Angeles	Lightweight

British Empire Games
Silver medal – second place	1930 Hamilton	Featherweight

Lawrence Stevens (25 February 1913 – 17 August 1989) was a South African boxer who competed in the 1932 Summer Olympics. He was born in Johannesburg and died in Durban, Natal. Both of his parents were born and raised in Johannesburg, all four of his grandparents were immigrants from England.

In 1930, he won the featherweight silver medal at the 1930 British Empire Games after losing the final to Frank Meachem. Two years later, he won the gold medal in the lightweight class after winning the final against Thure Ahlqvist.

Stevens was mentioned on the British quiz show Pointless on 26 January 2016, where South Africa was a "pointless answer" in the category of "Countries that won a gold medal winners at the 1932 or 1936 Summer Olympics".

Of Cornish descent, he was known as 'the Gentleman Boxer'. On the way home from the Olympics, a fellow passenger in the liner persistently asked Laurie to go a few rounds with him in the gym, eventually Laurie agreed and after two rounds, woke up to the fact that the fellow passenger was trying to knock him out, so that he could claim an Olympic Gold scalp. Laurie said 'enough Chum' and that was the end of a dream.

He fought in the Desert during the Second World War. In the postwar years he owned a factory and a sports shop in Rissik Street, Johannesburg. A handsome, laughing man, he always cried when recalling the raising of the Union Flag and the playing of God Save The King on the day he won his Olympic gold medal.

== 1932 Olympic results ==
Below are the results of Lawrence Stevens from the boxing tournament at the 1932 Los Angeles Olympics. Stevens competed for South Africa as a lightweight.

- Round of 16: defeated Jose Padilla (Philippines) by decision
- Quarterfinal: defeated Franz Kartz (Germany) by decision
- Semifinal: defeated Mario Bianchini (Italy) by decision
- Final: defeated Thure Ahlqvist (Sweden) by decision (won gold medal)
