= Tour =

Tour or Tours may refer to:

== Travel ==
- Tourism, travel for pleasure
- Tour of duty, a period of time spent in military service
- Campus tour, a journey through a college or university's campus
- Guided tour, a journey through a location, directed by a guide
- Walking tour, a visit of a historical or cultural site undertaken on foot

== Entertainment ==
- Concert tour, a series of concerts by a musical artist or group of artists in different locations
- Comedy tour, an organized trip where comedians travel to various places; see List of stand-up circuits
- Touring theatre, independent theatre that travels to different venues

== Sports ==
- Professional golf tours, otherwise unconnected professional golf tournaments
- Tennis tour, tennis played in tournament format at a series of venues
- Events in various sports named the Pro Tour (disambiguation)
- Tour de France (le Tour), the world's biggest bicycle race

== Places ==
- Tour-de-Faure, Lot, France
- Tour-en-Bessin, Calvados, France
- Tour-en-Sologne, Loir-et-Cher, France
- Tours, Indre-et-Loire, France
- Tours-en-Savoie, Savoie, France
- Tours-en-Vimeu, Somme, France
- Tours-sur-Marne, Marne, France
- Tours-sur-Meymont, Puy-de-Dôme, France
- Tours, Fribourg, an enclave of the canton of Fribourg, Switzerland
- Tours, Texas, United States

== People ==
- James Tour (born 1959), nanoscientist
- La Tour (surname)

== Other uses ==
- "Tour", an unreleased song by Basshunter
- Tours FC, a French association football club based in Tours

== See also ==
- Grand Tour (disambiguation)
- La Tour (disambiguation)
- Latour (disambiguation)
- Pro Tour (disambiguation)
- The Tour (disambiguation)
- Touré, West African surname
- Touring (disambiguation)
- Tourn, made by medieval sheriffs in England
