= Harry Mizler =

English boxer

Personal information
- Nationality: (United Kingdom) British
- Born: Hyman Barnett "Harry" Mizler; 22 January 1913 London, England
- Died: 1 March 1990 (aged 77) Wandsworth, Greater London, England
- Height: 5 ft 4 in (1.63 m)
- Weight: Bantamweight, Lightweight

Boxing career
- Stance: Orthodox

Boxing record
- Total fights: 81
- Wins: 63
- Win by KO: 20
- Losses: 16
- Draws: 2

Harry Mizler
Medal record

Men's Boxing

Representing England

British Empire Games
| Gold medal – first place | 1930 Hamilton | Bantamweight |

Hyman Barnett "Harry" Mizler (22 January 1913 – March 1990) was an English boxer who competed for Great Britain in the 1932 Summer Olympics and won the British BBoC Lightweight title in January 1934.

== Early life and amateur career ==
Mizler was born in Wicket Street, St Georges in the heart of the East End of London to Jewish parents. They had a fish stall in Watney Street Market and after leaving school he worked in the stall along with his brothers Moe and Judah, who also boxed. He had a stellar amateur career, winning the Federation of Working Men's Club's Bantamweight championship in 1929–30, and in 1932-3 held the ABA Amateur Bantamweight title.

At age seventeen, Mizler competed in the 1930 British Empire Games in Hamilton, Canada, where he won the gold medal in the bantamweight division, defeating Scotland’s Tommy Holt in the final.

In 1932 he was eliminated in the first round of the lightweight class at the Los Angeles Olympic Games, after losing his bout to the eventual bronze medalist Nathan Bor of the United States. His manager Victor Berliner was well known in British boxing circles.

=== Taking the BBoC British lightweight title, Jan 1934 ===
On 18 January 1934, he defeated Johnny Cuthbert in fifteen rounds at Kensington's Royal Albert Hall for the British Board of Control (BBofC) lightweight title. More experienced and accomplished, Cuthbert was the 1927 BBoC British featherweight champion. Nonetheless, showing immense talent at an early stage in his career, Mizler's title victory was only his tenth professional fight. Cuthbert was more aggressive in the early rounds but was unable to land effectively. As the fight progressed, Mizler’s defence improved, and he repeatedly used his left hand effectively against Cuthbert. In the final two rounds, Mizler pressed for a knockout but was unable to stop Cuthbert. Although Cuthbert continued to land punches, he did so less frequently and with less effect than Mizler. Contemporary reports described the bout as fast and clean, with few fouls called by the referee.

Mizler defended the British Boxing Board of Control lightweight title once, defeating Billy Quinlan on points over fifteen rounds on 4 August 1934 in Swansea, Wales.

==== Loss of lightweight title, Oct 1934 ====
Mizler lost the title to Jack Kid Berg on 29 October 1934 at the Royal Albert Hall, when his corner retired him at the end of the tenth round of a scheduled fifteen-round bout. Mizler was said to have "received a ceaseless drubbing from Berg's busy fists", with Berg using both hands against the face of his younger opponent. Berg pulled ahead decisively after the first two rounds. Mizler was more effective at long range, but Berg controlled the bout with greater speed and stronger close-range attacks. In the third round, Berg landed a left to the jaw that drove Mizler back to the ropes. Mizler struggled to defend against Berg’s left hooks to the jaw, and his corner retired him at the end of the tenth round.

On 2 October 1935, Mizler defeated Gustave Hummery of France by eighth-round stoppage. Mizler had been knocked down four times for counts of nine and once for a count of eight before the bell ended the round. In the eighth round, he knocked Hummery down with a left-right combination to the jaw, after which Hummery’s corner threw in the towel.

Mizler won the British Boxing Board of Control Southern Area lightweight title on 2 December 1935, defeating Norman Snow on points over fifteen rounds in Northampton. On 19 October 1936, he fought Jimmy Walsh for the British lightweight title but lost on points over fifteen rounds in Kensington. It was his final championship bout, although he continued boxing until 1944.

Mizler lost a ten-round points decision to NBA (National Boxing Association) featherweight champion Petey Sarron on 15 April 1937 in Harringay, North London. On 15 November 1937, he defeated American lightweight contender Al Roth on points over ten rounds in Kensington. Roth broke two bones in his right hand during the bout and was advised by the ringside physician to take a two-month break from competition.

In a return bout with American featherweight champion Sarron five months later in Johannesburg, South Africa, Sarron was disqualified for a low blow in the first round. It was the first and only time, Mizler would fight outside the United Kingdom. The bout, however, was not for the title, as both boxers were over the 125 pound featherweight weight limit.

== Life after boxing ==
In WWII, Mizler was called to serve in the British Royal Air Force in 1940 and served for the duration of the war. As physical training instructor, he devoted his abilities to teaching thousands of airmen the rudiments of boxing until he had to leave the Air Force due to stomach ailments. After the war he made a good living as an entrepreneur in the garment center.

He died in Wandsworth, Greater London, England, in March 1990.

== Selected fights ==
6 Wins, 4 Losses
| Result | Opponent(s) | Date | Location | Duration | Notes |
| Win | Johnny Cuthbert | 18 Jan 1934 | Kensington, West End, London | 15 Rounds | Won British lightweight title |
| Win | Billy Quinlan | 4 Aug 1934 | Swansea, Wales | 15 Rounds | Retained Brit. lightweight title |
| Loss | Jack Kid Berg | 29 Oct 1934 | Kensington, London | 10th Round TKO | Lost British lightweight title |
| Win | Gustave Hummery | 2 Oct 1935 | Kensington, London | 8th Round TKO | |
| Win | Norman Snow | 2 Dec 1935 | Northampton, Eng. | 15 Rounds | Won BBoC Southern Lightweight title |
| Loss | Jimmy Walsh | 19 Oct 1936 | Kensington, London | 15 Rounds | For BBoC Brit. Lightweight title |
| Win | Petey Sarron | 15 Apr 1937 | Johannesberg, SA | 1st Round DQ; Low blow, Non-title | Sarron-World feather champ |
| Loss | Petey Sarron | 19 Jun 1937 | Harringay, North London | 10 Rounds | Sarron-World feather champ |
| Win | Al Roth | 15 Nov 1937 | Kensington, London | 10 Rounds | Roth broke hand |
| Loss | Jack Kid Berg | 27 Feb 1941 | Cambridge Theatre | 10 Rounds | |
