= Daisuke Miyazaki (filmmaker) =

Japanese film director and screenwriter

- Born: 1980 (age 45–46); Yokohama, Japan
- Occupations: Film director, screenwriter

Daisuke Miyazaki (宮崎大祐, Miyazaki Daisuke; born 1980) is a Japanese film director and screenwriter.

== Birth, education and career ==
Miyazaki was born in 1980 in Yokohama, Japan. He began making films while attending Waseda University in Shinjuku, Tokyo. In 2004, his thesis film The 10th Room won the Grand Prix Award at New York University's KUT Film Festival in Japan.

Miyazaki directed the April 2025 film V. Maria, which follows Maria (played by model Hina Kikuchi) as she discovers the world of visual kei following the death of her mother. Sugizo served as composer, and his compositions for the film feature his Luna Sea bandmate Shinya on drums and Nemophila bassist Haraguchi-san. Haraguchi-san also appears in the film, as do the instrumentalists from BugLug and Arlequin's bassist Shohei.

== Selected filmography ==
Year	Film	Director	Writer	Producer	Notes	Ref(s)
2011	In a Lonely Planet		Yes			
2011	End of the Night	Yes	Yes			
2012	5 to 9	Yes	Yes	Yes	Anthology film; co-directed with Vincent Du, Tay Bee Pin, and Rasiguet Sookkarn	
2016	Yamato (California)	Yes	Yes	Yes		
2016	Dark Side of the Light		Yes			
2017	Tourism	Yes	Yes	Yes		
2019	Videophobia	Yes	Yes	Yes		
2019	Flaneur	Yes	Yes	Yes	Short film; also editor and cinematographer	
2019	Zawameki	Yes	Yes	Yes	Short film	
2023	#Mito	Yes	Yes			
2023	Plastic	Yes	Yes			
2025	V. Maria	Yes				
