= Henri de la Tour =

Henri de la Tour can refer to:

- Henri de la Tour-du-Pin (1296–1349), bishop of Metz
- Henri de la Tour (died 1415), bishop of Clermont
- Henri du Tour (c. 1540–1580), French name of Hendrik van den Keere
- Henri de La Tour d'Auvergne, Duke of Bouillon (1555–1623), French nobleman
- Henri de la Tour d'Auvergne, Vicomte de Turenne (1611–1675), Marshal of France
- Louis Henri de La Tour d'Auvergne (1679–1753), French nobleman
- Henri, prince de La Tour d'Auvergne (1823–1871), French politician, Minister of Foreign Affairs for Napoleon III
