= Latour (restaurant) =

Coordinates: 52°14′27.66″N 4°25′40.31″E

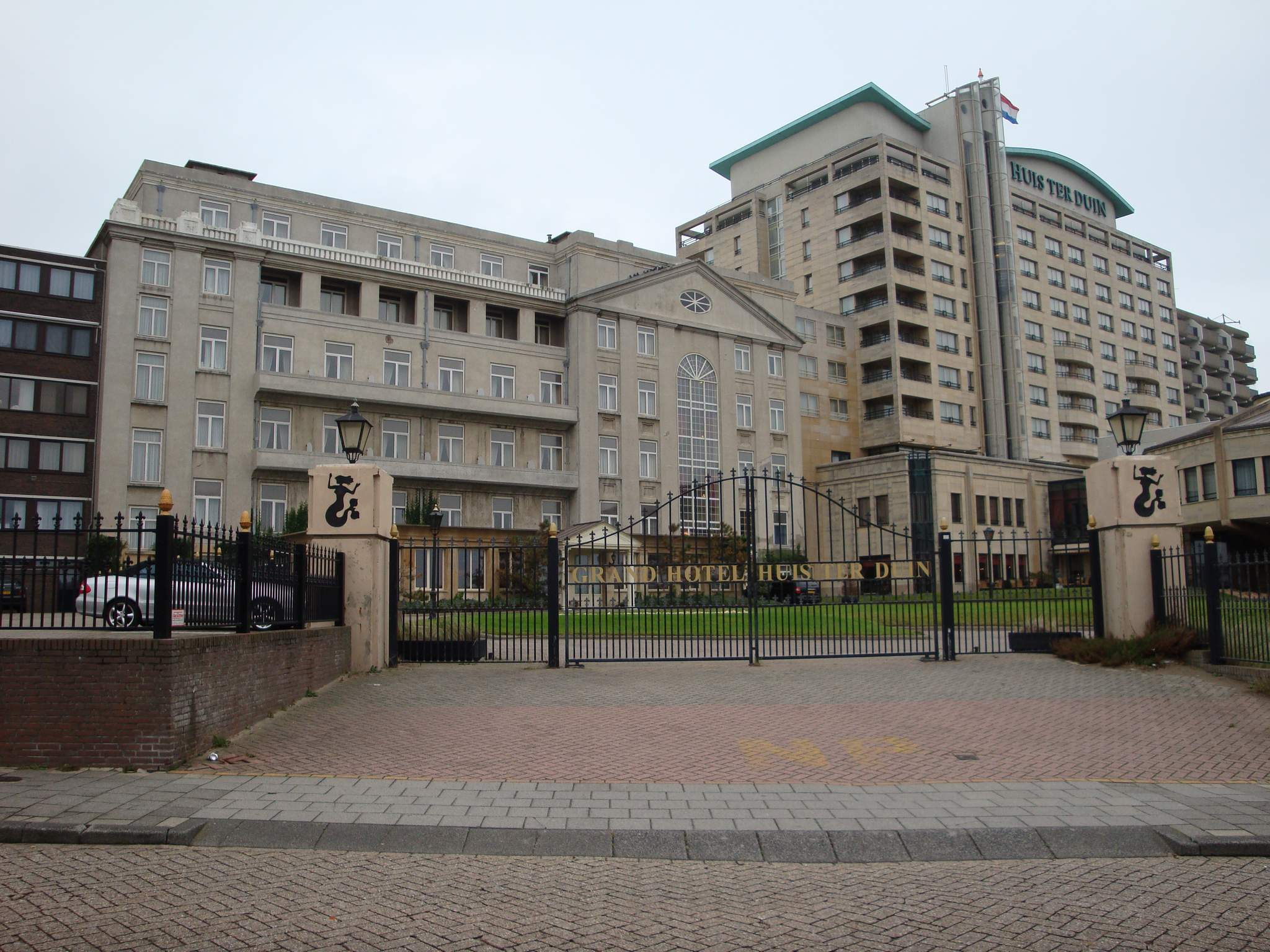
- The Huis ter Duin hotel in which the restaurant is situated
- Interactive map of Latour

Restaurant information
- Established: abt. 1997
- Head chef: Marcel van Lier
- Food type: French
- Rating: Michelin Guide
- Location: Koningin Astrid Boulevard 5, Noordwijk, 2200 AB, Netherlands
- Seating capacity: 60
- Website: Official website

Latour is a restaurant housed in Grand Hotel Huis ter Duin in Noordwijk, Netherlands. It is a fine dining restaurant that was awarded one Michelin star for the period 2005–present.

GaultMillau awarded the restaurant 16 out of 20 points.

Head chef of Latour is Marcel van Lier Van Lier succeeded Erik Jansen in 2000.

Former sous chef Maurits van der Vooren died 23 March 2021, aged 37, from cancer.

Latour often takes part in cooking competitions, scoping awards in the "Roussillon Dessert Trophée" 2004 and 2007 and the "Grand Concours Laurent-Perrier" 2005.

== See also ==
- Latour restaurant website
- List of Michelin starred restaurants in the Netherlands
