= The Tour =

The Tour may refer to:

- The Tour de France cycling race
- The Tour (album), a 1998 live album by Mary J. Blige
- The Olivia Tremor Control/Black Swan Network, an album also known as The Tour EP
- The Tour (Kiss and Mötley Crüe), a 2012 concert tour
- The Tour (film) (Turneja), a 2008 Bosnian/Serbian film
- "The Tour", a 1955 episode of I Love Lucy
- The Tour (Boygenius), a 2023 concert tour by American supergroup Boygenius

== See also ==
- The Grand Tour, a tour of Europe and the Holy Land conducted by British gentleman in the 18th and 19th century
- 1981 South Africa rugby union tour of New Zealand and the United States, widely and controversially known as The Tour in New Zealand
- ABBA: The Tour, third and final concert tour by ABBA
- Streisand: The Tour, unofficial name of Barbra Streisand's fall 2006 North American concert tour
- Anthems: The Tour, debut headlining concert tour of Kerry Ellis
