= Gaston Mayor =

French boxer

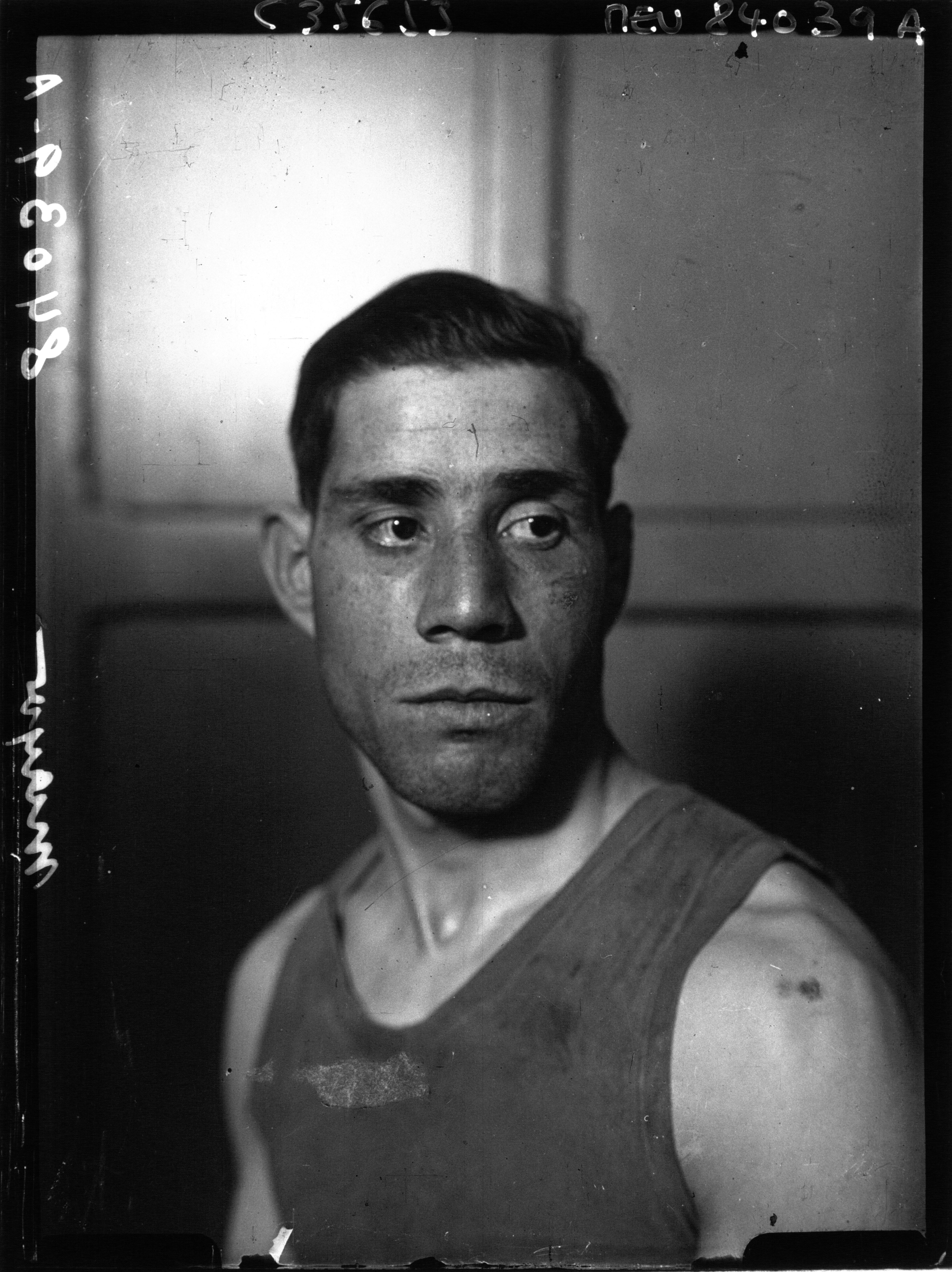

Personal information
- Nationality: French
- Born: 29 February 1908; Segovia, Spain

Sport
- Sport: Boxing

Gaston Mayor (born 29 February 1908, date of death unknown) was a French boxer. He competed in the men's lightweight event at the 1932 Summer Olympics.
