= Tourism (film) =

2017 pseudo-documentary film

- Promotional release poster
- Directed by: Daisuke Miyazaki
- Written by: Daisuke Miyazaki
- Starring: Nina Endo; SUMIRE
- Release dates: November 11, 2017 (ArtScience Museum); July 13, 2019 (Japan)
- Running time: 77 minutes
- Countries: Japan; Singapore
- Languages: Japanese; English; Malay

Tourism is a 2017 pseudo-documentary film written and directed by Daisuke Miyazaki. An international co-production of Japan and Singapore, it stars Nina Endo as Nina, a Japanese part-time factory worker who, after winning free airline tickets, travels to Singapore with her friend Su (played by SUMIRE).

Tourism was first screened at Singapore's ArtScience Museum in 2017, as part of the museum's "Specters and Tourists" exhibition. The film had its international premiere at the Japan Cuts film festival on 29 July 2018, and received a theatrical release in Japan on 13 July 2019.

== Cast ==
- Nina Endo as Nina
- SUMIRE as Su

== Release ==
Tourism was first screened at Singapore's ArtScience Museum from 11 November to 17 December 2017, as part of the museum's "Specters and Tourists" exhibition. "Specters and Tourists" was a two-part film installation commissioned by the ArtScience Museum and the Singapore International Film Festival. The first part of the installation featured scenes from other films directed by writer-director Daisuke Miyazaki, presented on multiple screens; the second part of the installation was Tourism.

Tourism had its international premiere at the Japan Cuts film festival on 29 July 2018. It received a theatrical release in Japan on 13 July 2019.

== Critical reception ==
Mark Schilling of The Japan Times gave Tourism three out of five stars, calling it a "slight-but-likable road movie". Film Pulse's Adam Patterson called the film "a pleasantly lowkey riff on alienation and materialism within a globalizing society shot in pseudo-documentary style, replete with quirky dance sequences, Snapchat filters, ghosts and a mysterious child narrator."
