= Nathan Bor =

American boxer (1913–1972)

Personal information
- Nationality: (United States) American
- Born: March 1, 1913 Fall River, Massachusetts
- Died: June 13, 1972 (aged 59) New Bedford, Massachusetts
- Weight: Lightweight, Welterweight

Boxing career
- Stance: Orthodox

Boxing record
- Total fights: 49
- Wins: 34
- Win by KO: 22
- Losses: 12
- Draws: 3
Medal record
Men's Boxing
Representing the United States
Olympic Games
Bronze medal – third place	1932 Los Angeles	Lightweight

Nathan "Nat" Bor (March 1, 1913 – June 13, 1972) was an American boxer who won a lightweight bronze medal at the 1932 Summer Olympics. He continued primarily a professional welterweight boxing career until around 1940, when he served as a Marine in World War II, before returning to start a dry cleaning business in his home of Fall River, Massachusetts.

== Personal ==
Bor was Jewish, and of Russian heritage. He was born in Fall River, Massachusetts, on March 1, 1913.

== Amateur career ==
As an amateur, Bor won 90 of 95 bouts, taking both the New England and then the National lightweight championships. During his amateur career, he sidelined as a telephone operator in his home of Fall River.

Spike Webb 1924

As the 1932 United States Amateur Lightweight Champion, he was sent to the Los Angeles Olympics and received the Olympic bronze medal in the lightweight class after winning the third place fight against Mario Bianchini on August 13. Bor was coached by the talented Spike Webb, the American team boxing coach at the 1932 Olympics, who spent much of his later career training the nearly undefeated teams of the US Naval Academy in Annapolis.

=== 1932 Olympics ===
In the quarterfinal, he defeated Harry Mizler, future British lightweight champion, in three rounds on points In the semifinal, he lost to Thure Ahlqvist, representing Sweden, on points in three rounds. According to one local source, Bor took a lead in the second round with strong blows to the head, but in the third and final round pulled up too often in clinches and lost from longer left and rights to the head from his taller Swedish opponent. In the bronze medal bout, he defeated Mario Bianchini, representing Italy, on points for third place.

== Professional career ==
Bor won his first professional bout with a second-round knockout of Al Hope on October 5, 1932, at the Casino in his home of Fall River, Massachusetts. The win was followed by a streak of wins that lasted four years and included nearly 28 fights.

In a disappointing turn that ended Bor's long early career winning streak, he lost to the somewhat heavier, more experienced, and likely more talented Babe Marino on October 21, 1936, in a widely anticipated eight round main event at the Auditorium in Oakland. Due to the bout's potential importance and Bor's successful record, he was trained by two well known former contenders, Jimmy Duffy and ex-light heavy champ Tommy Loughran. Before a substantial crowd of 4,000, Bor lost decisively, beginning in the second round when Marino began crowding him, and Bor could only land the occasional right hand to the chin which did little damage compared to the constant barrage he received from Marino. Marino was given every round but the sixth by the judges. The loss hurt Bor's chances of progressing to a title shot.

Bobby Allen fell to Bor on April 12, 1937, in a ten-round points decision in Holyoke, Massachusetts. Winning in an upset, Bor floored his rival with a lethal uppercut to the chin in the tenth round.

On June 24, 1937, he lost a ninth-round technical knockout to Andy Callahan at Brave's Field in Boston. Early in the bout, Bor suffered a bad cut over his left eye, which grew worse until the referee stopped the fighting 1:05 into the ninth round. Though there were no knockdowns in the bout, Callahan managed to earn a large lead on points from the opening rounds.

Bor lost to Frankie Britt, a former New England Lightweight champion, on October 6, 1938, at the Fall River Casino in a twelve-round unanimous decision.

He defeated K.O. Castillo on October 28, 1938, in a ten-round newspaper decision in Portland, Oregon. The Boston Globe gave Bor nine of the ten rounds.

His last bout on May 24, 1940, was an eighth-round technical knockout loss to Joe Boscarino in Boston Garden.

== Life after boxing ==
Bor joined the Marines during World War II and served as a boxing coach stationed at Paris Island, the well-known Marine base in southeastern South Carolina. After the war, he returned to Massachusetts, where he first worked as a foreman at the Eastern Sportswear Manufacturing Company and then opened the Olympic Dry Cleaners in 1948 in his hometown of New Bedford.

He died on June 13, 1972, in New Bedford, Massachusetts, after suffering a heart attack while on his dry cleaning route, leaving a wife, Leona, and two children. A memorial service was held at Fall River's Fisher Memorial Chapel.

== Selected fights ==
7 Wins, 4 Losses
Result	Opponent(s)	Date	Location	Duration	Notes
Win	Harry Mizler	Aug 9, 1932	Los Angeles	3 Rounds	1932 Olympic win
Loss	Thure Ahlqvist	Aug 12, 1932	Los Angeles	3 Rounds	1932 Olympic loss
Win	Mario Bianchini	Aug 13, 1932	Los Angeles	3 Rounds	Won Olympic Bronze
Win	Al Hope	Oct 5, 1932	Fall River, MA	2nd Round KO	
Win	Babe Marino	Oct 21, 1936	Oakland California	8 Rounds	Broke a long streak of 28 wins
Win	Bobby Allen	Apr 12, 1937	Holyoke, MA	10 Rounds	Upset
Win	Joe Gelinas	May 31, 1937	Holyoke, MA	3rd Round TKO	Gelinas down 5 times
Loss	Andy Callahan	June 24, 1937	Braves Field, Boston	9th Round KO	Bor suffered bad cut, over left eye
Loss	Frankie Britt	Oct 6, 1938	Fall River, MA	12 Round UD	Former New England light champ
Win	K. O. Castillo	Oct 28, 1938	Portland	10 Rounds	Newspaper Decision
Loss	Joe Boscarino	May 24, 1940	Boston Garden	8th Round TKO	

== See also ==
- List of select Jewish boxers
