= Franz Kartz =

German boxer

- Born: Roland Colin Holt; 17 March 1907; Mülheim an der Ruhr, German Empire
- Died: After 1932
- Occupation: Boxer
- Height: 1,55 m

Franz Kartz (born 17 March 1907, date of death unknown) was a German boxer who competed in the 1932 Summer Olympics. He was born in Mülheim an der Ruhr. In 1932 he was eliminated in the second round of the lightweight class after losing his bout to the upcoming gold medalist Lawrence Stevens.
