= Allard-Latour =

Car

The Allard-Latour was a car made by M. Allard-Latour of Lyon, France. Belt or chain driven, small numbers were made, from 1899 to 1902. Most if not all were sold in the Lyons area.
