= Mario Bianchini =

Italian boxer (1911–1957)

Personal information
- Nationality: Italian
- Born: 14 May 1911 Rome, Italy
- Died: 1 June 1957 (aged 46)
- Weight: Lightweight, Welterweight

Boxing career
- Stance: Orthodox

Boxing record
- Total fights: 45
- Wins: 22
- Win by KO: 15
- Losses: 15
- Draws: 8

Mario Bianchini (14 May 1911 – 1 June 1957) was an Italian boxer who competed in the 1932 Summer Olympics. He took the Italian Welterweight title on 26 January 1938 in Rome.

Bianchini was born in Rome, Italy on 13 May 1911. In 1932 he finished fourth in the lightweight class after losing the bronze medal bout to Nathan Bor.

== Taking the Italian welterweight title, 1938 ==
He won the Italian Welterweight title against Amadeo Deyana in a twelve round points decision on 26 January 1938 in Rome.

His grandson David Bianchini was a professional association football player, notably for then serie A side Foggia in the early 1990s.
