= Ruby Goldstein =

American boxer (1907–1984)

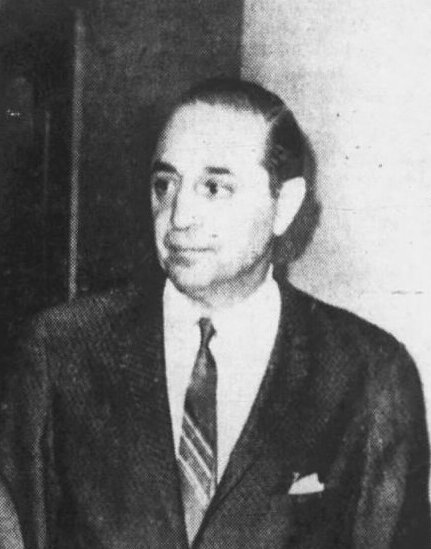
- Goldstein circa 1958

Personal information
- Nickname: The Jewel of the Ghetto
- Born: Reuven Goldstein; October 7, 1907 New York City, New York, U.S.
- Died: April 23, 1984 (aged 76) Miami Beach, Florida, U.S.
- Height: 5 ft 4.5 in (1.64 m)
- Weight: Lightweight; Welterweight

Boxing career
- Stance: Orthodox

Boxing record
- Total fights: 61
- Wins: 55
- Win by KO: 39
- Losses: 6
- Draws: 0
- No contests: 0

Reuven "Ruby" Goldstein (October 7, 1907 – April 23, 1984), the "Jewel of the Ghetto", was an American boxer and prize fight referee. He was a serious World Lightweight Championship contender in the 1920s, and became one of America's most trusted and respected boxing referees in the 1950s. During his boxing career, he was trained and managed by Hymie Cantor.

== Early life and boxing career ==
Ruby Goldstein was born on Cherry Street, in a small three room apartment on the Lower East Side of Manhattan. His widowed mother, whose husband had died a few months before Goldstein was born, took in sewing and washing in an effort to raise her four children. Before he became a referee, Goldstein boxed professionally from 1925 to 1937. Nicknamed the "Jewel of the Ghetto," Goldstein was a smooth boxing, hard punching lightweight and later welterweight with a large following in his hometown of New York City. He lost only six fights in his professional career and an astounding 70 percent of his wins were by knockout or technical knockout.

Goldstein dropped out of school around 14 to take an office job, but was boxing as an amateur by sixteen. He started his boxing training as an anemic looking featherweight at around 125 pounds, and boxed almost exclusively in the lightweight range between 1923 and 1928, impressively winning all but three of his first thirty-two fights from December 1924 and June 15, 1927. On that date he lost to the extraordinary, Sid Terris in a first-round knockout at the Polo Grounds in New York City. Terris was considered by many to have been one of the fastest lightweights of the era, as well as possessing the best defensive skills.

On May 11, 1925, Goldstein won a six-round points decision against Ray Mitchell at the Pioneer Sporting Club in New York City.

=== Win against Tony Vacarelli ===
On May 17, 1926, Goldstein, fighting at 136 1/2 pounds, won a sixth-round technical knockout against Tony Vacarelli in Madison Square Garden. The Scranton Republican wrote that "Goldstein...scored a technical knockout over a rugged veteran, Tony Vacarelli in the middle of the final round. Goldstein, hailed as a lightweight championship prospect, gave a dazzling exhibition of footwork, boxing skill and hitting, battering Vacarelli into such helplessness that the referee stopped the fight." It was an impressive win as Vacarelli had not previously been knocked out.

=== Knockout loss to Ace Hudkins in June 1926 ===
As a result of hard punches to the head, Goldstein was stopped in the three major fights he fought against Jimmy McLarnin, Ace Hudkins and fellow New Yorker Sid Terris. Goldstein's youth, reckless management, and the exceptional quality of his opponents could also explain his knockout losses. He met Hudkins as a lightweight on June 25, 1926, at Coney Island Stadium in Brooklyn, before 18,000 fans, losing in a fourth-round knockout. Hudkins took the Nebraska State Lightweight title in February 1924. Hudkins was down on the mat for a count of five in the first round from a right cross to the jaw, and Goldstein appeared to be winning the bout. Goldstein took the second round by a good margin, with the third close to a draw. In the fourth, Hudkins floored Goldstein twice with rights and lefts, before ending the bout with a right to the jaw for the final count of ten, with Goldstein down on the mat still holding to the ropes. Goldstein was only eighteen at the time of the bout, and may have lacked the defensive skills or endurance to withstand the blows of Hudkins. He had not been knocked out before, and according to the Lincoln Star, had won twenty-three consecutive bouts prior to the match.

=== Knockout loss to Billy Alger in September 1926 ===
On September 24, 1926, Goldstein lost a sixth-round technical knockout to Billy Alger at Dreamland Rink in San Francisco, California. The loss by Goldstein was so rare that some suspected poor management. A few speculated Waxy Gordon, a crime boss, who may have held a significant percentage of his contract, had influenced the outcome of the bout. Goldstein refused to come out for the sixth because of a badly sprained ankle, but some believe he had risen too soon from a knockdown or been unwisely influenced to face a boxer at only eighteen with whom he was overmatched, particularly after a previous loss in June. Goldstein slipped from a right to the jaw in the opening of the fifth and in the resulting fall to the mat, sprained his ankle. He was unable to answer the call for the sixth round.

On March 29, 1927, he knocked out Billy Petrolle at the Pioneer Sporting Club in New York in the first of six rounds. Petrolle went down after a right to the chin 45 seconds into the first round, after a count of two in a prior knockdown. It was an impressive victory, and the fastest knockout of Goldstein's career.

On May 13, 1927, Goldstein won an important six round points decision at the large venue of New York's Madison Square Garden against the former July 1925 NYSAC World Lightweight Champion Jimmy Goodrich. It was a close bout and fought hard, but Goldstein's ability to elude Goodrich gave him the narrow lead in the bout.

=== Knockout loss to Sid Terris, May 1927 ===
Sid Terris

The Sid Terris fight was a much-hyped battle between the two rival Jewish New Yorkers on June 15, 1927, at New York's Polo Grounds. Terris and Goldstein had known each other for many years and had attended high school together. Each fighter had his legion of supporters, and their eagerly anticipated face-off produced a stirring 1-round fight before 40,000 enthusiastic fans. Goldstein seized the advantage when he floored Terris for a count of nine with a right to the jaw, around 1:25 into the first round, and confidently seemed on his way to an easy victory. Terris, however, upon arising timed Goldstein's charge and caught him coming in with a powerful blow, knocking Goldstein out. Terris suffered from the same susceptibility to knockouts as Goldstein, and was himself KOed by Irish great Jimmy McLarnin who possessed extraordinary speed and punching power. The blow Terris dealt that felled Goldstein was a solid right to the jaw that may have been a slight bit high, 1:47 into the first round, not long after Terris had been down for his count of nine.

Coming back from his loss to Terris, after a three-month lay-off on December 19, 1927, he knocked out Ray Mitchell in the third round of six at the St. Nicholas Arena in New York. Mitchell had been down for a count of nine in the second round. Fighting at 139, Goldstein was nearing the welterweight range of 140, technically fighting as a superlightweight. After the Ray Mitchell bout, Goldstein fought most of his bouts as a welterweight, and fought quality opponents but few serious contenders until his match with McLarnin.

=== Knockout loss to Jimmy McLarnin, December 1929 ===
Goldstein lost to Jimmy McLarnin in a second-round knockout at New York's Madison Square Garden before 19,000 fans on December 13, 1929. Goldstein was first down for a count of nine from a left to the head in the first round, and for a count of nine by another right in the opening of the second that knocked him into the ropes. He arose but was knocked to the mat for the final count shortly after. McLarnin was easily one of the most gifted boxers of the era, and possessed a strong punch, and lightning speed. Delaware's Morning News described McLarnin as "one of the greatest of modern day punchers." Both boxers were fighting in the welterweight range, very close to 144 pounds.

Goldstein was in serious trouble in the first round, and had trouble rising from the count of nine. He may have lost the fight to a knockout if not for the bell ending the round. Both boxers were fighting in the welterweight range at 144 pounds, and the bout was considered by several sources as an informal elimination bout for two world welterweight championship contenders, though it was not described as a world championship.

On September 10, 1930, he scored a third-round technical knockout against Jack Zivic at the Henderson Bowl in Brooklyn, New York, fighting well into the welterweight range at 145 pounds. In the second round, Ruby unleashed a number of blows to Zivic's jaw. Weakened in the second, with a few seconds before the bell in the third, Goldstein leveled a striking attack that put Zivic on the mat for the full count. Ruby had gone eight months without a bout since his loss to McLarnin.

Fighting again as a welterweight, on April 29, 1932, he was knocked out by Dick Sisk in a second-round TKO at Chicago Stadium in Chicago, Illinois. Goldstein was down three times for counts of nine, before a fourth knockdown prompted the referee to end the bout as a technical knockout. Ruby had gone six months without a bout since his loss to Joe Macedon, who knocked him out in the seventh round in Newark, New Jersey. He would win more bouts and score some impressive knockouts in his final five years and eleven bouts, but never aspire to welterweight contention status. His last bout was against Al Grosso on August 13, 1937. which he won by a third-round TKO.

== Career as referee ==
After having completed his service in the army in the 1940s where he began refereeing fights, Goldstein established himself as a trusted and experienced ring official, and refereed in many high-profile bouts. He served as a referee for 21 years, and was the "third man in the ring" for 39 world title fights.

=== Refereeing the Sugar Ray Robinson vs. Joey Maxim Light Heavyweight Championship ===
He refereed the Sugar Ray Robinson-Joey Maxim light heavyweight title fight on June 25, 1952. he bout was held outdoors at Yankee Stadium in the Bronx, New York. Robinson, the reigning middleweight king, was seeking to wrest Maxim's light heavyweight crown. Temperature at ringside measured a blistering 104 degrees Fahrenheit (40 degrees Celsius), and it was even hotter in the ring under the lights.

A preview of the fight's ending occurred when Goldstein collapsed from the heat after the 10th round, and could not finish refereeing the remainder of the match. Another referee, Ray Miller, was rushed into service so that the fight could be concluded. In the 13th round, Robinson began wavering, and staggered around the ring on unsteady, wobbly legs. Overcome by the heat, he could not answer the bell for the 14th round, resulting in a 14th round TKO for Maxim. Robinson, who was ahead in the scoring, was thus deprived of an opportunity to win a world title in a third division. When asked if Maxim got lucky when Robinson collapsed from the heat, his colorful manager, Jack "Doc" Kearns, replied: "It was just as hot for Maxim in there as it was for Robinson." Robinson commented: "I lasted longer than Goldstein, and nobody was hitting him."

=== Refereeing Patterson vs. Johansson ===
Goldstein also refereed the first Floyd Patterson-Ingemar Johansson world heavyweight championship fight in Yankee Stadium on June 26, 1959. In the third round Johansson floored Patterson, who arose but appeared out on his feet. Goldstein was criticized for not immediately stopping the match and allowing Johansson to knock Patterson down six more times before ultimately awarding the bout to Johansson.

=== Refereeing the "Kid Paret" vs. Emile Griffith World Welterweight Championship ===
The biggest controversy involving Goldstein as a referee occurred in on March 24, 1962, when he refereed the Benny "Kid" Paret-Emile Griffith world welterweight championship fight, which was televised live by American Broadcasting Company in Madison Square Garden. Paret was hung-up against the ropes in the 12th round when Griffith delivered a barrage of unanswered punches to the head of the seemingly helpless Paret as Goldstein looked on. When Goldstein finally intervened, Paret slumped to the canvas, unconscious. He died 10 days later from the injuries he suffered in that bout. Goldstein refereed only one more fight, two years later between Luis Rodriguez and Holley Mims. Before the fatal bout, Goldstein had been regarded by many as the finest referee in boxing. His son Herb pointed out that he had often been criticized for stopping other fights too early.

== Personal life and death ==
The years between 1937 and 1942 were particularly difficult for Ruby, having lost most of his savings in the stock market crash. He worked for a time managing a friend's billiard parlor and continued to work as a boxing trainer when he could.

Goldstein enlisted in the army in 1942, rising to the rank of sergeant, and working as a physical trainer and boxing coach at Fort Hamilton in Brooklyn. After obtaining a license, he began refereeing, and toured with Joe Louis as a referee, refereeing Louis's match with Jersey Joe Walcott in 1947. After the war, making little at first as a referee, he worked as a public relations manager for Schenley Distillers.

In 1959, Funk & Wagnalls published his memoirs, titled Third Man In The Ring, as told to sports writer Frank Graham.

Goldstein moved to Miami Beach in his retirement in 1977. Goldstein was remarried to his second wife, Beatrice. He had been previously married to the former Mae Owen, with whom he had a son, Herbert. Having been treated at Mt. Sinai Hospital, he died of throat cancer in his home in Miami Beach on April 23, 1984. His second wife and son survived him. Services for Goldstein were held in New York, and he was buried in New Montefiore Cemetery in Pinelawn, New York, on Long Island.

== Halls of Fame ==
Goldstein was inducted into the International Boxing Hall of Fame in 1994, as well as the World Boxing Hall of Fame.

Goldstein, who was Jewish, was inducted into the International Jewish Sports Hall of Fame in 1995.

== Professional boxing record ==
61 fights	55 wins	6 losses
By knockout	39	6
By decision	16	0
By disqualification	0	0
Draws	0	

No.	Result	Record	Opponent	Type	Round, time	Date	Location	Notes
61	Win	55–6	(United States) Al Grosso	TKO	3 (8), 2:43	13 Aug 1937	(United States) Ocean View A.A., Long Branch, New Jersey, U.S.	
60	Win	54–6	(United States) Kid Bon Bon	PTS	6	10 Aug 1937	(United States) Adelphia A. A. Arena, Elizabeth, New Jersey, U.S.	
59	Win	53–6	(United States) Jimmy Armstrong	KO	2 (8), 2:49	23 Jul 1937	(United States) Ocean View A.A., Long Branch, New Jersey, U.S.	
58	Win	52–6	(United States) Fred Fitzsimmons	PTS	8	22 Feb 1937	(United States) Laurel Garden, Newark, New Jersey, U.S.	
57	Win	51–6	(United States) Willie Cheatum	TKO	1 (8)	8 Feb 1937	(United States) Laurel Garden, Newark, New Jersey, U.S.	
56	Win	50–6	(United States) Herman Perlick	TKO	1 (8), 1:20	11 Sep 1933	(United States) Fugazy Bowl, Brooklyn, New York, U.S.	
55	Win	49–6	(United States) Paolo Villa	TKO	1 (8), 2:36	5 Sep 1933	(United States) Fugazy Bowl, Brooklyn, New York, U.S.	
54	Win	48–6	(United States) Willie Hines	TKO	5 (6)	10 Dec 1932	(United States) Broadway Arena, Brooklyn, New York, U.S.	
53	Win	47–6	(United States) Sol Fischer	KO	1 (10)	11 Aug 1932	(United States) Fort Hamilton Arena, Brooklyn, New York, U.S.	
52	Win	46–6	(United States) Mike Prevetti	KO	1 (6), 0:38	5 Aug 1932	(United States) Long Beach Stadium, Long Beach, California, U.S.	
51	Win	45–6	(United States) Mike Esposito	KO	1 (6)	28 Jul 1932	(United States) Long Beach Stadium, Long Beach, California, U.S.	
50	Win	44–6	(United States) Ralph Landis	KO	1 (6), 0:53	22 Jul 1932	(United States) Long Beach Stadium, Long Beach, California, U.S.	
49	Loss	43–6	(United States) Dick Sisk	TKO	2 (6)	29 Apr 1932	(United States) Chicago Stadium, Chicago, Illinois, U.S.	
48	Loss	43–5	(United States) Jay Macedon	KO	7 (10)	2 Nov 1931	(United States) Laurel Garden, Newark, New Jersey, U.S.	
47	Win	43–4	(United States) Danny Cooney	KO	2 (10), 0:44	9 Jul 1931	(United States) Dreamland Rink, Newark, New Jersey, U.S.	
46	Win	42–4	(United States) Willie Garafola	PTS	6	23 Dec 1930	(United States) Broadway Arena, Brooklyn, New York, U.S.	
45	Win	41–4	(United States) Jack Zivic	TKO	3 (10), 2:20	10 Sep 1930	(United States) Henderson's Bowl, Brooklyn, New York, U.S.	
44	Win	40–4	(United States) Joe Trabon	TKO	3 (10)	25 Aug 1930	(United States) Dexter Park Arena, Queens, New York, U.S.	
43	Loss	39–4	(Canada) Jimmy McLarnin	KO	2 (10)	13 Dec 1929	(United States) Madison Square Garden, New York City, New York, U.S.	
42	Win	39–3	(United States) Joe Reno	TKO	3 (10)	21 Oct 1929	(United States) Madison Square Garden, New York City, New York, U.S.	
41	Win	38–3	(United States) Freddie Mueller	TKO	7 (10)	24 Sep 1929	(United States) Queensboro Stadium, Queens, New York, U.S.	
40	Win	37–3	(United States) Joey Kaufman	TKO	8 (10)	16 Aug 1929	(United States) Coney Island Stadium, Brooklyn, New York, U.S.	
39	Win	36–3	(United States) Cuddy DeMarco	KO	4 (10)	2 Aug 1929	(United States) Coney Island Stadium, Brooklyn, New York, U.S.	
38	Win	35–3	(Germany) Billy Drako	KO	3 (10)	12 Jul 1929	(United States) Playland Stadium, Queens, New York, U.S.	
37	Win	34–3	(United States) Gene Johnson	KO	2 (10)	2 May 1929	(United States) Elizabeth, New Jersey, U.S.	
36	Win	33–3	(United States) Al Bryant	TKO	4 (10)	19 Nov 1928	(United States) Broadway Arena, Brooklyn, New York, U.S.	
35	Win	32–3	(United States) Al Bryant	PTS	10	31 Jul 1928	(United States) Newark Velodrome, Newark, New Jersey, U.S.	
34	Win	31–3	(United States) Danny Cooney	PTS	6	31 Jan 1928	(United States) Pioneer Sporting Club, New York City, New York, U.S.	
33	Win	30–3	(United States) Ray Mitchell	KO	3 (6)	19 Dec 1927	(United States) St. Nicholas Arena, New York City, New York, U.S.	
32	Loss	29–3	(United States) Sid Terris	KO	1 (6)	15 Jun 1927	(United States) Polo Grounds, New York City, New York, U.S.	
31	Win	29–2	(United States) Jimmy Goodrich	PTS	6	13 May 1927	(United States) Madison Square Garden, New York City, New York, U.S.	
30	Win	28–2	(United States) Johnny Ceccoli	TKO	1 (6)	2 May 1927	(United States) Broadway Arena, Brooklyn, New York, U.S.	
29	Win	27–2	(United States) Johnny Sacco	KO	1 (6), 2:15	14 Apr 1927	(United States) Pioneer Sporting Club, New York City, New York, U.S.	
28	Win	26–2	(United States) Pete Petrolle	KO	1 (6)	29 Mar 1927	(United States) Pioneer Sporting Club, New York City, New York, U.S.	
27	Win	25–2	(United States) Sig Keppen	KO	2 (6)	21 Mar 1927	(United States) Broadway Arena, Brooklyn, New York, U.S.	
26	Win	24–2	(United States) Mickey Travers	KO	1 (6), 2:10	23 Nov 1926	(United States) Pioneer Sporting Club, New York City, New York, U.S.	
25	Loss	23–2	(United States) Billy Alger	TKO	6 (8)	24 Sep 1926	(United States) Dreamland Rink, San Francisco, California, U.S.	
24	Loss	23–1	(United States) Ace Hudkins	KO	4 (6)	25 Jun 1926	(United States) Coney Island Stadium, Brooklyn, New York, U.S.	
23	Win	23–0	(United States) Tony Vaccarelli	TKO	6 (6), 1:08	17 May 1926	(United States) Madison Square Garden, New York City, New York, U.S.	
22	Win	22–0	(United States) Ray Mitchell	PTS	6	11 May 1926	(United States) Pioneer Sporting Club, New York City, New York, U.S.	
21	Win	21–0	(United States) Pep O'Brien	TKO	3 (6)	16 Apr 1926	(United States) Pioneer Sporting Club, New York City, New York, U.S.	
20	Win	20–0	(United States) Billy Pollock	TKO	2 (6)	16 Feb 1926	(United States) Pioneer Sporting Club, New York City, New York, U.S.	
19	Win	19–0	(United States) Johnny Ceccoli	PTS	6	5 Feb 1926	(United States) Madison Square Garden, New York City, New York, U.S.	
18	Win	18–0	(United States) Harry Carlson	TKO	6 (6)	4 Jan 1926	(United States) Mechanics Hall, Boston, Massachusetts, U.S.	
17	Win	17–0	(United States) Georgie Day	TKO	3 (6)	29 Dec 1925	(United States) Pioneer Sporting Club, New York City, New York, U.S.	
16	Win	16–0	(United States) Bud Dempsey	PTS	6	1 Dec 1925	(United States) Pioneer Sporting Club, New York City, New York, U.S.	
15	Win	15–0	(United States) Earl Baird	TKO	1 (6), 2:50	21 Oct 1925	(United States) Manhattan Casino, New York City, New York, U.S.	
14	Win	14–0	(Italy) Red Cap Wilson	PTS	6	2 Oct 1925	(United States) Pioneer Sporting Club, New York City, New York, U.S.	
13	Win	13–0	(United States) Jackie Coburn	PTS	6	4 Aug 1925	(United States) Coney Island Stadium, Brooklyn, New York, U.S.	
12	Win	12–0	(United States) Joe Malone	PTS	6	23 Jul 1925	(United States) New York Velodrome, New York City, New York, U.S.	
11	Win	11–0	(United States) Frankie Albano	KO	1 (6)	6 Jul 1925	(United States) Queensboro Stadium, New York City, New York, U.S.	
10	Win	10–0	(United Kingdom) Freddie Jacks	PTS	6	16 Jun 1925	(United States) Coney Island Stadium, Brooklyn, New York, U.S.	
9	Win	9–0	(United States) Earl Gray	TKO	4 (6)	1 Jun 1925	(United States) Queensboro Stadium, New York City, New York, U.S.	
8	Win	8–0	(United States) Spencer Gardner	PTS	6	20 May 1925	(United States) Manhattan Casino, New York City, New York, U.S.	
7	Win	7–0	(United States) Harry Nelson	KO	1 (6)	29 Apr 1925	(United States) Manhattan Casino, New York City, New York, U.S.	
6	Win	6–0	(United States) Augie Pisano	PTS	6	25 Mar 1925	(United States) Manhattan Casino, New York City, New York, U.S.	
5	Win	5–0	(United States) Harry Herron	PTS	6	10 Mar 1925	(United States) Pioneer Sporting Club, New York City, New York, U.S.	
4	Win	4–0	(United States) Joe Eppy	KO	1 (6)	2 Mar 1925	(United States) Lenox A.C., New York City, New York, U.S.	
3	Win	3–0	(United States) Irving Shapiro	TKO	2 (6)	10 Feb 1925	(United States) Pioneer Sporting Club, New York City, New York, U.S.	
2	Win	2–0	(United States) Eddie Markat	KO	1 (4)	20 Jan 1925	(United States) Pioneer Sporting Club, New York City, New York, U.S.	
1	Win	1–0	(United States) Al Vano	KO	2 (4)	30 Dec 1924	(United States) Pioneer Sporting Club, New York City, New York, U.S.	

== See also ==
- List of select Jewish boxers
