= Mike Ballerino =

American boxer (1901–1965)

Personal information
- Born: April 10, 1901 Asbury Park, New Jersey, U.S.
- Died: April 4, 1965 (aged 63) Tampa, Florida, U.S.
- Height: 5 ft 4 in (1.63 m)
- Weight: Super featherweight Junior Lightweight

Boxing career
- Stance: Orthodox

Boxing record
- Total fights: 98
- Wins: 39
- Win by KO: 5
- Losses: 36
- Draws: 18
- No contests: 5

Mike Ballerino (April 10, 1901 – April 4, 1965) was an American World Jr. Lightweight boxing champion who began his career in the Philippines boxing with the U. S. Army. Ballerino took the World Jr. Lightweight Championship against Steve "Kid" Sullivan on April 1, 1925, in Philadelphia, Pennsylvania, in a ten-round unanimous decision.

The Jr. Lightweight class is now referred to as Super featherweight.

== Early career in Manila, Philippines with the U.S. Army ==
Ballerino was born to an Italian family in Asbury Park, New Jersey, on April 10, 1901. At the age of seventeen he began boxing for the Army in the Philippines, where he was stationed, and according to one source won the bantam championship of the Orient in a 20-round match. Many of his bouts were never documented. At the age of 18, he would become known as a skilled bantamweight in Manila. He is not remembered as a polished boxer with refined, scientific technique, but a relentless and determined fighter who thrilled audiences. He lacked a frequent record of knockouts and a strong punch, but he made up for it with enthusiasm and a relentless attack.

A few sources state he began boxing as early as 1918 with the Army, but Ballerino's first known bout in the Philippines was in January 1920 against Kid Ponzo, which he won in a third-round knockout. Rising to face top-rated opponents quickly, he met future Filipino World Flyweight Champion Pancho Villa nine times between January 1920, and October 1921 losing to him in six bouts.

== Coming to the United States ==
Leaving the Army in the Philippines in late 1921, Ballerino decided it was time to begin "boxing in earnest".

He fought his first bout in the United States at the Eagles Athletic Club in Tacoma, Washington, on December 21, 1921, against Frankie Britt. Britt was a well-known American featherweight and later lightweight who would contend for the Pacific Coast Title in both these weight classes. Though the bout was a six-round draw, the crowd was thrilled with the pace of the fight and Ballerino's value as a future contender for the Jr. Lightweight Title was established. His primary opponent in the Philippines, Pancho Villa arrived in America to fight the following year, with the assistance of legendary manager and promoter Tex Rickard.

== Boxing management in Tacoma ==
Ballerino was managed in his early career in Tacoma, Washington, by Eddie Tait, a former American featherweight boxer, who had briefly managed boxers and opened movie theaters in the Philippines where Ballerino had his start.

== Early boxing career in Tacoma, Washington ==
On May 18, 1922, he lost to Sammy Gordon in four rounds. The Seattle Star advertised the bout as a "Special Event", but for a boxer who was nearly local to Seattle, there was relatively little pre-fight publicity. The Junior Lightweight Class was in its infancy and its boxers did not attract the attention of boxers from more established weight classes. After taking the Jr. Lightweight Title, Ballerino would draw larger crowds, and greater coverage.

He fought Mike DePinto on June 12 and 26, 1922 in Washington drawing in six and losing in four rounds respectively. DePinto was a skilled Italian lightweight a shade below the skill of a serious contender. Their June 12 bout was only a preliminary for a bout between Jimmy Sacco and Joe Gorman in Aberdeen. Ballerino would not make the top of boxing cards often until taking the championship, though near the end of his career he would fight a number of name boxers in front of larger audiences.

On October 25, 1922, he fought Seattle bantamweight Buddy Ridley at the Auditorium in Tacoma, in a bout that was pre-determined as a six-round draw at the insistence of Ballerino's manager Eddie Tait. The bout was a good draw, and spectators from Seattle flocked to Tacoma, as Ballerino was "a rip snorting battler." Leo Lassen of the Seattle Star noted that Ballerino "had always gone over big in every one of his scraps in the Northwest." Ballerino's manager Eddie Tait had worked as a boxing matchmaker, and referee, and had once been a boxer in contention for the featherweight championship. Tait had managed a boxing club in Honolulu in 1908.

== Moving to Bayonne, New Jersey, from the West Coast ==
He settled in Bayonne, New Jersey, the state of his birth, and set out to find worthy opponents. Shortly after his move to New Jersey, he impressively fought twice at New York's Madison Square Garden. On January 5, 1923, he met Frankie Jerome in a twelve-round draw and on January 19, he met Carl Tremaine in a second round loss by technical knockout.

On June 18, 1923, he lost to Jewish lightweight Charley Goodman in a six-round points decision at the Polo Grounds in New York, a venue for well-attended, popular bouts. The fight was described as a "slugging match all the way."

On July 21, 1923, he gave an "artistic trimming" to boxer Joe O'Donnell in an eight-round win at Shetzline Ballpark in Philadelphia. One source noted that in his typical style, "Ballerino slammed Joe with nearly everything in sight, but the Gloucester blacksmith took his punishment without a whimper". The fight was a preliminary to an historic bout between his former opponent Pancho Villa and Kid Williams. Pancho Villa's feature fight received far more newspaper coverage. After the move, he would find larger audiences, better known opponents, and more income boxing in New England and the Midwest where he primarily focused his career after January 1923.

=== Boxing management in New York ===
He was managed by Frank Churchill from New York when he moved to Bayonne, New Jersey, and Mel Cooke, who was also a New York-based manager and promoter with boxing clubs in Brooklyn. Like his previous manager, Eddie Tait, Churchill had managed boxers in Manila and the Far East around 1920.

== Ramp up to the World Jr. Lightweight Title ==
He first fought Steve "Kid" Sullivan, who would soon take the Jr. Lightweight Championship, on May 30, 1924, in Brooklyn, winning impressively in a twelve-round points decision.

He fought Vincent "Pepper" Martin, an important opponent, for the first time in a non-title fight on June 24, 1924, winning in a twelve-round points decision at the Nostrand Athletic Club in Brooklyn, New York. Martin was considered a top New York based contender for the Jr. Lightweight Championship.

=== Steve "Kid" Sullivan takes Jr. Lightweight Title ===
Steve "Kid" Sullivan took the Jr. Lightweight Title on June 20, 1924, against champion Johnny Dundee.

Still in line for a shot at the title, on July 15 and August 5, 1924, Ballerino fought Jr. Lightweight Championship contender Allentown Johnny Leonard in Brooklyn, New York, winning both non-title fights in 10 and 12 round points decisions.

Fighting in Brooklyn again, on September 10, 1924, he beat Tony Vacarelli, another Jr. Lightweight Championship contender, in a ten-round points decision.

=== Ballerino's first World Jr. Lightweight Title bouts with Steve "Kid" Sullivan ===
Ballerino fought Sullivan, now the new World Jr. Lightweight Champion, on October 15, 1924, in a Jr. Lightweight Title fight in New York, losing in a fifth-round knockout in their first meeting.

== Taking and defending the World Jr. Lightweight Title ==
Ballerino fought a Jr. Lightweight Championship against Steve "Kid" Sullivan on December 15, 1924, at the Auditorium in Milwaukee, Wisconsin, in a ten-round newspaper decision.

In a World Jr. Lightweight rematch on April 1, 1925, Ballerino won a unanimous decision against his frequent rival Steve Sullivan at the Armory in Philadelphia, Pennsylvania, in a bout that went the full ten rounds. Several sources attribute Ballerino first taking the title from Sullivan at this bout, not his former bout with Sullivan in Milwaukee. One source wrote, "Ballerino took the lead at the opening of the fight and kept it up to the end, beating his foe in almost every round." Both judges agreed that Sullivan took only the first and seventh rounds.

He fought a ten-round World Jr. Lightweight Title fight resulting in a No Contest with the highly rated Jewish lightweight Frankie Callahan of Brooklyn in Columbus, Ohio, on June 1, 1925. Ballerino risked the title if he could not last the full ten rounds with Callahan.

On June 24, 1925, he retained his championship going ten full rounds to a draw with local boxer Babe Ruth in Philadelphia, Pennsylvania, at the Phillies Baseball Park before 10,000 satisfied fans. The fight was close, but in his typically aggressive style Ballerino won enough rounds to prevent his loss of the title. as many as half the rounds may have gone to Ruth, but Ballerino landed many hard body shots throughout the bout, and managed to gain the victory.

He successfully defended the title on July 6, 1925, against Vincent "Pepper" Martin in a fifteen-round unanimous decision at Queensborough Stadium in Queens, New York. Martin was recognized at the time as a top American Jr. Lightweight contender.

=== Losing the Jr. Lightweight Title one year later ===
Ballerino lost the Jr. Lightweight Title on December 2, 1925, in a ten-round technical knockout against Tod Morgan at Olympic Auditorium in Los, Angeles. Though putting up a typically aggressive and tireless display, the Lincoln Star wrote that Ballerino only won the first round decisively. He was down for a nine count in the third round, outpunched badly against the ropes in the sixth, and had the crowd shouting to end the bout by the ninth and tenth rounds. The Associated Press wrote that Ballerino's seconds had his manager Frank Churchill threw in the towel, though they already knew Morgan had clinched the bout on points. Ballerino held the title nearly a year, a significant period in the competitive world of East Coast American boxing.

== Boxing after loss of the Jr. Lightweight Title ==
After losing his title, Ballerino fought Allentown Johnny Leonard twice more on June 5 and July 21, 1926, in Queens, New York, and his hometown of Bayonne, New Jersey. He lost the June 5 bout on a ten-round points decision, but received a ten-round draw from his July 21 bout in Bayonne.

On September 30, 1926, he fought highly rated boxer Eddie Lord at Nutmeg Stadium in New Haven, Connecticut, winning in a ten-round points decision.

He fought Jewish boxer Joe Glick twice in November and December 1926 to ten-round draws in Brooklyn.

== Boxing decline and retirement ==
On March 18, 1927, Ballerino began a five-match losing streak that ended with his last fight against Maxie Strub in Conneaut Lake, Pennsylvania, on June 27, 1928. He lost to reigning World Featherweight Champion Benny Bass, in a fast ten-round points decision on October 17, 1927. "Bass, who was outweighed by seven pounds punched hard and accounted for a knockdown in the fourth round but Ballerino was up at the count of eight". Bass would take the World Junior Lightweight Championship from Tod Morgan in late 1929.

Getting out of boxing at the relatively early age of twenty-six was a wise choice for Ballerino, and not one every boxer was able to make. He had only five losses by knockout in his career, so he may have fared better than many champions who left the ring having suffered greater physical injury.

By 1938, near the end of the Depression, he was taking down tents at the Tennessee State Fair as a "canvas" man. He claimed to have spent all of the approximately $400,000 he made during his boxing career, though he was proud of making his own way and said he had no regrets.

He eventually retired to Tampa, Florida, where he died on April 4, 1965, at the relatively early age of 63. With 98 bouts to his credit, his prolific boxing schedule with many top-rated opponents may have contributed to a somewhat early death.

== Professional boxing record ==
All information in this section is derived from BoxRec, unless otherwise stated.

=== Official record ===
100 fights	34 wins	32 losses
By knockout	5	7
By decision	29	25
Draws	14	
No contests	2	
Newspaper decisions/draws	18	

All newspaper decisions are officially regarded as “no decision” bouts and are not counted in the win/loss/draw column.

No.	Result	Record	Opponent	Type	Round, time	Date	Location	Notes
100	Loss	34–32–14 (20)	Young Dominick	TKO	6 (8)	Dec 6, 1934	Legion Arena, Fort Lauderdale, Florida, U.S.	
99	Loss	34–31–14 (20)	Patsy Bernardella	TKO	2 (8), 2:26	Sep 6, 1932	Englewood Arena, Englewood, New Jersey, U.S.	
98	Loss	34–30–14 (20)	Maxie Strub	PTS	10	Jun 27, 1928	Academy of Music, Conneaut Lake, Pennsylvania, U.S.	
97	Loss	34–29–14 (20)	Tommy Grogan	TKO	4 (10)	Jan 20, 1928	Auditorium, Omaha, Nebraska, U.S.	
96	Loss	34–28–14 (20)	Mike Dundee	TKO	10 (12)	Nov 21, 1927	Memorial Hall, Dayton, Ohio, U.S.	
95	Loss	34–27–14 (20)	Joey Medill	PTS	10	Nov 11, 1927	Ashland Blvd. Auditorium, Chicago, Illinois, U.S.	
94	Loss	34–26–14 (20)	Benny Bass	PTS	10	Oct 17, 1927	Arena, Philadelphia, Pennsylvania, U.S.	
93	Loss	34–25–14 (20)	Bobby Burns	PTS	6	Sep 3, 1927	Ridgewood Grove, New York City, New York, U.S.	
92	Loss	34–24–14 (20)	King Tut	NWS	10	Apr 26, 1927	Auditorium, Saint Paul, Minnesota, U.S.	
91	Loss	34–24–14 (19)	Jack Duffy	NWS	10	Apr 19, 1927	Armory, Akron, Ohio, U.S.	
90	Loss	34–24–14 (18)	Nat Kawler	PTS	10	Mar 18, 1927	Van Curler Theatre, Schenectady, New York, U.S.	
89	Draw	34–23–14 (18)	Marty Silvers	PTS	6	Mar 5, 1927	Ridgewood Grove, New York City, New York, U.S.	
88	Draw	34–23–13 (18)	Maxie Holub	NWS	10	Feb 2, 1927	Amory, Akron, Ohio, U.S.	
87	Loss	34–23–13 (17)	Al Foreman	PTS	10	Jan 24, 1927	Arena, Philadelphia, Pennsylvania, U.S.	
86	Draw	34–22–13 (17)	Joe Glick	PTS	10	Dec 20, 1926	Broadway Arena, New York City, New York, U.S.	
85	Win	34–22–12 (17)	Georgie Balduc	PTS	10	Nov 29, 1926	Broadway Arena, New York City, New York, U.S.	
84	Draw	33–22–12 (17)	Joe Glick	PTS	10	Nov 13, 1926	Ridgewood Grove, New York City, New York, U.S.	
83	Loss	33–22–11 (17)	Tommy Herman	PTS	10	Nov 8, 1926	Arena, Philadelphia, Pennsylvania, U.S.	
82	Win	33–21–11 (17)	Eddie Lord	PTS	10	Sep 30, 1926	Nutmeg Stadium, New Haven, Connecticut, U.S.	
81	Win	32–21–11 (17)	Johnny Kochansky	NWS	10	Sep 15, 1926	Bayonne Stadium, Bayonne, New Jersey, U S.	
80	Loss	32–21–11 (16)	Georgie Day	PTS	10	Aug 30, 1926	Nutmeg Stadium, New Haven, Connecticut, U.S.	
79	Win	32–20–11 (16)	Allentown Johnny Leonard	NWS	10	Jul 21, 1926	Bayonne Sadium, Bayonne, New Jersey, U.S.	
78	Loss	32–20–11 (15)	Augie Pisano	PTS	6	Jul 9, 1926	Stadium, Long Beach, New York, U.S.	
77	Win	32–19–11 (15)	Petey Mack	NWS	10	Jun 25, 1926	Bayonne Stadium, Bayonne, New Jersey, U.S.	Inaugural USA New Jersey State super featherweight title at stake; (via KO only)
76	Loss	32–19–11 (14)	Allentown Johnny Leonard	PTS	10	Jun 5, 1926	Queensboro Stadium, New York City, New York, U.S.	
75	Loss	32–18–11 (14)	Tod Morgan	TKO	10 (10)	Dec 2, 1925	Olympic Auditorium, Los Angeles, California, U.S.	Lost NYSAC and The Ring super featherweight titles
74	Loss	32–17–11 (14)	Ace Hudkins	PTS	10	Oct 21, 1925	Olympic Auditorium, Los Angeles, California, U.S.	
73	Win	32–16–11 (14)	Billy Henry	NWS	10	Aug 14, 1925	Bayonne Stadium, Bayonne, New Jersey, U.S.	
72	Win	32–16–11 (13)	Vincent Martin	UD	15	Jul 6, 1925	Queensboro Stadium, New York City, New York, U.S.	Retained NYSAC and The Ring super featherweight title
71	Draw	31–16–11 (13)	Babe Ruth	PTS	10	Jun 23, 1925	Shibe Park, Philadelphia, Pennsylvania, U.S.	
70	Win	31–16–10 (13)	Billy Henry	NWS	10	Jun 16, 1925	Kansas City, Kansas, U.S.	
69	Draw	31–16–10 (12)	Frankie Schaeffer	NWS	10	Jun 12, 1925	Aurora Bowl, Aurora, Illinois, U.S.	
68	Win	31–16–10 (11)	Frankie Callahan	PTS	10	May 30, 1925	Columbus, Ohio, U.S.	
67	Win	30–16–10 (11)	Mickey Brown	NWS	12	May 15, 1925	Bayonne Stadium, Bayonne, New Jersey, U.S.	
66	Win	30–16–10 (10)	Steve Sullivan	UD	10	Apr 1, 1925	108th Field Artillery Amory, Philadelphia, Pennsylvania, U.S.	Won NYSAC and The Ring super featherweight titles
65	Win	29–16–10 (10)	Vincent Martin	KO	11 (12), 1:16	Feb 5, 1925	Rink S.C., New York City, New York, U.S.	
64	Loss	28–16–10 (10)	Frankie Monroe	NWS	10	Jan 1, 1925	Auditorium, Milwaukee, Wisconsin, U.S.	
63	Win	28–16–10 (9)	Steve Sullivan	NWS	10	Dec 15, 1924	Auditorium, Milwaukee, Wisconsin, U.S.	NYSAC and The Ring super featherweight titles at stake; (via KO only)
62	Loss	28–16–10 (8)	Steve Sullivan	KO	5 (15)	Oct 15, 1924	Madison Square Garden, New York City, New York, U.S.	For NYSAC and The Ring super featherweight title
61	Win	28–15–10 (8)	Tony Vaccarelli	PTS	10	Sep 10, 1924	Henderson's Bowl, New York City, New York, U.S.	
60	Win	27–15–10 (8)	Allentown Johnny Leonard	PTS	12	Aug 4, 1924	Henderson's Bowl, New York City, New York, U.S.	
59	Win	26–15–10 (8)	Allentown Johnny Leonard	PTS	10	Jul 15, 1924	Henderson's Bowl, New York City, New York, U.S.	
58	Win	25–15–10 (8)	Vincent Martin	PTS	12	Jun 24, 1924	Nostrand A.C., New York City, New York, U.S.	
57	Win	24–15–10 (8)	Steve Sullivan	PTS	12	May 30, 1924	Henderson's Bowl, New York City, New York, U.S.	
56	Win	23–15–10 (8)	Joe Celmars	NWS	12	Apr 22, 1924	Strand Theatre, Bayonne, New Jersey, U.S.	
55	Win	23–15–10 (7)	Joe Ryder	PTS	12	Mar 14, 1924	Madison Square Garden, New York City, New York, U.S.	
54	Win	22–15–10 (7)	Joe Souza	PTS	10	Feb 21, 1924	Clermont Avenue Rink, New York City, New York, U.S.	
53	Win	21–15–10 (7)	Mickey Brown	PTS	10	Dec 28, 1923	Madison Square Garden, New York City, New York, U.S.	
52	Win	20–15–10 (7)	Al Markie	NWS	8	Nov 19, 1923	Arena, Philadelphia, Pennsylvania, U.S.	
51	Win	20–15–10 (6)	Joe Nelson	PTS	10	Aug 22, 1923	Velodrome, New York City, New York, U.S.	
50	Win	19–15–10 (6)	Joe O'Donnell	NWS	8	Jul 31, 1923	Shetzline Ballpark, Philadelphia, Pennsylvania, U.S.	
49	Win	19–15–10 (5)	Harry Foley	PTS	8	Jul 20, 1923	Mechanics Building, Boston, Massachusetts, U.S.	
48	Loss	18–15–10 (5)	Charley Goodman	PTS	6	Jun 18, 1923	Polo Grounds, New York City, New York, U.S.	
47	Loss	18–14–10 (5)	Cuddy DeMarco	NWS	10	May 28, 1923	Motor Square Garden, Pittsburgh, Pennsylvania, U.S.	
46	Draw	18–14–10 (4)	Cuddy DeMarco	NWS	8	Apr 30, 1923	Arena, Philadelphia, Pennsylvania, U.S.	
45	Loss	18–14–10 (3)	Bobby Wolgast	NWS	8	Mar 19, 1923	Arena, Philadelphia, Pennsylvania, U.S.	
44	Loss	18–14–10 (2)	Harvey Bright	PTS	10	Mar 16, 1923	Madison Square Garden, New York City, New York, U.S.	
43	Win	18–13–10 (2)	Billy Fitzsimmons	PTS	10	Feb 13, 1923	Mechanics Building, Boston, Massachusetts, U.S.	
42	Loss	17–13–10 (2)	Carl Tremaine	TKO	2 (12)	Jan 19, 1923	Madison Square Garden, New York City, New York, U.S.	
41	Draw	17–12–10 (2)	Frankie Jerome	PTS	12	Jan 5, 1923	Madison Square Garden, New York City, New York, U.S.	
40	Draw	17–12–9 (2)	Young Bud Ridley	PTS	6	Oct 25, 1922	Auditorium, Tacoma, Washington, U.S.	
39	Draw	17–12–8 (2)	Vic Foley	PTS	10	Oct 13, 1922	Arena, Vancouver, Canada	
38	Draw	17–12–7 (2)	Vic Foley	PTS	6	Sep 28, 1922	Auditorium, Tacoma, Washington, U.S.	
37	Draw	17–12–6 (2)	Sammy Gordon	PTS	6	Sep 14, 1922	Auditorium, Tacoma, Washington, U.S.	
36	Win	17–12–5 (2)	Ernie Daley	PTS	6	Sep 7, 1922	Legion Hall, Olympia, Washington, U.S.	
35	Loss	16–12–5 (2)	Mike DePinto	PTS	4	Jun 26, 1922	Fort Lewis, Washington, U.S.	
34	Draw	16–11–5 (2)	Mike DePinto	PTS	6	Jun 12, 1922	Aberdeen, Washington, U.S.	
33	Loss	16–11–4 (2)	Sammy Gordon	PTS	4	May 18, 1922	Auditorium, Tacoma, Washington, U.S.	
32	Win	16–10–4 (2)	Kid LaRose	PTS	4	May 4, 1922	Eagles Hall, Tacoma, Washington, U.S.	
31	Win	15–10–4 (2)	Frank Pantley	PTS	4	Apr 25, 1922	Arena, Seattle, Washington, U.S.	
30	Win	14–10–4 (2)	Soldier Toth	TKO	3	Mar 30, 1922	Camp Lewis, Washington, U.S.	Pacific Northwest Military elimination tournament
29	Win	13–10–4 (2)	Soldier Shea	TKO	3	Mar 28, 1922	Fort Lewis, Washington, U.S.	Pacific Northwest Military elimination tournament
28	Win	12–10–4 (2)	Mike Mitchell	PTS	4	Mar 23, 1922	Tacoma Washington, U.S.	
27	Loss	11–10–4 (2)	Mirillo Guida	PTS	8	Feb 22, 1922	Fort Lewis, Washington, U.S.	Fort Lewis's boxing elimination series
26	Win	11–9–4 (2)	Jimmy Cole	PTS	4	Feb 1, 1922	U.S.	Exact date and location unknown.
25	Win	10–9–4 (2)	Eddie Moore	PTS	6	Jan 12, 1922	Eagles Hall, Tacoma, Washington, U.S.	
24	Draw	9–9–4 (2)	Frankie Britt	PTS	6	Dec 29, 1921	Eagles A.C., Tacoma, Washington, U.S.	
23	Loss	9–9–3 (2)	Pancho Villa	PTS	20	Oct 5, 1921	Manila, Metro Manila, Philippines	
22	Draw	9–8–3 (2)	Pete Sarmiento	PTS	8	Sep 10, 1921	Olympic Stadium, Manila, Philippines	
21	Loss	9–8–2 (2)	Pancho Villa	PTS	20	Aug 23, 1921	Manila, Metro Manila, Philippines	
20	Loss	9–7–2 (2)	Cowboy Reyes	PTS	8	Aug 13, 1921	Olympic Stadium, Manila, Philippines	
19	Draw	9–6–2 (2)	Pancho Villa	PTS	15	Jul 25, 1921	Manila, Metro Manila, Philippines	
18	Loss	9–6–1 (2)	Pancho Villa	PTS	15	May 8, 1921	Manila, Metro Manila, Philippines	
17	Loss	9–5–1 (2)	Pancho Villa	PTS	10	Mar 5, 1921	Olympic Stadium, Manila, Philippines	
16	Win	9–4–1 (2)	Tip O'Neill	PTS	8	Feb 5, 1921	U.S.	Exact date and location unknown
15	Win	8–4–1 (2)	Young Givinni	KO	1	Feb 1, 1921	U.S.	Exact date and location unknown
14	Draw	7–4–1 (2)	Pancho Villa	PTS	15	Jan 10, 1921	Manila, Metro Manila, Philippines	
13	Loss	7–4 (2)	Irineo Flores	PTS	4	Jul 3, 1920	Olympic Stadium, Manila, Philippines	
12	Loss	7–3 (2)	Syd Keenan	PTS	8	Jul 1, 1920	U.S.	Exact date and location unknown
11	Win	7–2 (2)	Eddie Moore	PTS	10	Jun 20, 1920	U.S.	Exact date and location unknown
10	Win	6–2 (2)	Leoncio Bernabe	PTS	6	Jun 10, 1920	U.S.	Exact date and location unknown
9	Win	5–2 (2)	Kid Taylor	PTS	4	Jun 1, 1920	U.S.	Exact date and location unknown
8	Win	4–2 (2)	Kid Ponzo	PTS	4	May 1, 1920	U.S.	Exact date and location unknown
7	Loss	3–2 (2)	Pancho Villa	PTS	6	Apr 10, 1920	Manila, Metro Manila, Philippines	Exact date unknown
6	Win	3–1 (2)	Kid Saunders	PTS	4	Apr 1, 1920	U.S.	Exact date and location unknown
5	NC	2–1 (2)	Pancho Villa	NC	6 (6)	Mar 25, 1920	Manila, Metro Manila, Philippines	Exact date unknown
4	Loss	2–1 (1)	Pancho Villa	PTS	6	Mar 10, 1920	Manila, Metro Manila, Philippines	Exact date unknown
3	Win	2–0 (1)	Kid Aquila	PTS	4	Mar 1, 1920	U.S.	Exact date and location unknown
2	NC	1–0 (1)	Pancho Villa	NC	6 (6)	Feb 25, 1920	Manila, Metro Manila, Philippines	Exact date unknown
1	Win	1–0	Kid Ponzo	KO	3	Jan 1, 1920	U.S.	Exact date and location unknown

=== Unofficial record ===
100 fights	44 wins	37 losses
By knockout	5	7
By decision	39	30
Draws	17	
No contests	2	

Record with the inclusion of newspaper decisions in the win/loss/draw column.

No.	Result	Record	Opponent	Type	Round, time	Date	Location	Notes
100	Loss	44–37–17 (2)	Young Dominick	TKO	6 (8)	Dec 6, 1934	Legion Arena, Fort Lauderdale, Florida, U.S.	
99	Loss	44–36–17 (2)	Patsy Bernardella	TKO	2 (8), 2:26	Sep 6, 1932	Englewood Arena, Englewood, New Jersey, U.S.	
98	Loss	44–35–17 (2)	Maxie Strub	PTS	10	Jun 27, 1928	Academy of Music, Conneaut Lake, Pennsylvania, U.S.	
97	Loss	44–34–17 (2)	Tommy Grogan	TKO	4 (10)	Jan 20, 1928	Auditorium, Omaha, Nebraska, U.S.	
96	Loss	44–33–17 (2)	Mike Dundee	TKO	10 (12)	Nov 21, 1927	Memorial Hall, Dayton, Ohio, U.S.	
95	Loss	44–32–17 (2)	Joey Medill	PTS	10	Nov 11, 1927	Ashland Blvd. Auditorium, Chicago, Illinois, U.S.	
94	Loss	44–31–17 (2)	Benny Bass	PTS	10	Oct 17, 1927	Arena, Philadelphia, Pennsylvania, U.S.	
93	Loss	44–30–17 (2)	Bobby Burns	PTS	6	Sep 3, 1927	Ridgewood Grove, New York City, New York, U.S.	
92	Loss	44–29–17 (2)	King Tut	NWS	10	Apr 26, 1927	Auditorium, Saint Paul, Minnesota, U.S.	
91	Loss	44–28–17 (2)	Jack Duffy	NWS	10	Apr 19, 1927	Armory, Akron, Ohio, U.S.	
90	Loss	44–27–17 (2)	Nat Kawler	PTS	10	Mar 18, 1927	Van Curler Theatre, Schenectady, New York, U.S.	
89	Draw	44–26–17 (2)	Marty Silvers	PTS	6	Mar 5, 1927	Ridgewood Grove, New York City, New York, U.S.	
88	Draw	44–26–16 (2)	Maxie Holub	NWS	10	Feb 2, 1927	Amory, Akron, Ohio, U.S.	
87	Loss	44–26–15 (2)	Al Foreman	PTS	10	Jan 24, 1927	Arena, Philadelphia, Pennsylvania, U.S.	
86	Draw	44–25–15 (2)	Joe Glick	PTS	10	Dec 20, 1926	Broadway Arena, New York City, New York, U.S.	
85	Win	44–25–14 (2)	Georgie Balduc	PTS	10	Nov 29, 1926	Broadway Arena, New York City, New York, U.S.	
84	Draw	43–25–14 (2)	Joe Glick	PTS	10	Nov 13, 1926	Ridgewood Grove, New York City, New York, U.S.	
83	Loss	43–25–13 (2)	Tommy Herman	PTS	10	Nov 8, 1926	Arena, Philadelphia, Pennsylvania, U.S.	
82	Win	43–24–13 (2)	Eddie Lord	PTS	10	Sep 30, 1926	Nutmeg Stadium, New Haven, Connecticut, U.S.	
81	Win	42–24–13 (2)	Johnny Kochansky	NWS	10	Sep 15, 1926	Bayonne Stadium, Bayonne, New Jersey, U S.	
80	Loss	41–24–13 (2)	Georgie Day	PTS	10	Aug 30, 1926	Nutmeg Stadium, New Haven, Connecticut, U.S.	
79	Win	41–23–13 (2)	Allentown Johnny Leonard	NWS	10	Jul 21, 1926	Bayonne Sadium, Bayonne, New Jersey, U.S.	
78	Loss	40–23–13 (2)	Augie Pisano	PTS	6	Jul 9, 1926	Stadium, Long Beach, New York, U.S.	
77	Win	40–22–13 (2)	Petey Mack	NWS	10	Jun 25, 1926	Bayonne Stadium, Bayonne, New Jersey, U.S.	Inaugural USA New Jersey State super featherweight title at stake; (via KO only)
76	Loss	39–22–13 (2)	Allentown Johnny Leonard	PTS	10	Jun 5, 1926	Queensboro Stadium, New York City, New York, U.S.	
75	Loss	39–21–13 (2)	Tod Morgan	TKO	10 (10)	Dec 2, 1925	Olympic Auditorium, Los Angeles, California, U.S.	Lost NYSAC and The Ring super featherweight titles
74	Loss	39–20–13 (2)	Ace Hudkins	PTS	10	Oct 21, 1925	Olympic Auditorium, Los Angeles, California, U.S.	
73	Win	39–19–13 (2)	Billy Henry	NWS	10	Aug 14, 1925	Bayonne Stadium, Bayonne, New Jersey, U.S.	
72	Win	38–19–13 (2)	Vincent Martin	UD	15	Jul 6, 1925	Queensboro Stadium, New York City, New York, U.S.	Retained NYSAC and The Ring super featherweight title
71	Draw	37–19–13 (2)	Babe Ruth	PTS	10	Jun 23, 1925	Shibe Park, Philadelphia, Pennsylvania, U.S.	
70	Win	37–19–12 (2)	Billy Henry	NWS	10	Jun 16, 1925	Kansas City, Kansas, U.S.	
69	Draw	36–19–12 (2)	Frankie Schaeffer	NWS	10	Jun 12, 1925	Aurora Bowl, Aurora, Illinois, U.S.	
68	Win	36–19–11 (2)	Frankie Callahan	PTS	10	May 30, 1925	Columbus, Ohio, U.S.	
67	Win	35–19–11 (2)	Mickey Brown	NWS	12	May 15, 1925	Bayonne Stadium, Bayonne, New Jersey, U.S.	
66	Win	34–19–11 (2)	Steve Sullivan	UD	10	Apr 1, 1925	108th Field Artillery Amory, Philadelphia, Pennsylvania, U.S.	Won NYSAC and The Ring super featherweight titles
65	Win	33–19–11 (2)	Vincent Martin	KO	11 (12), 1:16	Feb 5, 1925	Rink S.C., New York City, New York, U.S.	
64	Loss	32–19–11 (2)	Frankie Monroe	NWS	10	Jan 1, 1925	Auditorium, Milwaukee, Wisconsin, U.S.	
63	Win	32–18–11 (2)	Steve Sullivan	NWS	10	Dec 15, 1924	Auditorium, Milwaukee, Wisconsin, U.S.	NYSAC and The Ring super featherweight titles at stake; (via KO only)
62	Loss	31–18–11 (2)	Steve Sullivan	KO	5 (15)	Oct 15, 1924	Madison Square Garden, New York City, New York, U.S.	For NYSAC and The Ring super featherweight title
61	Win	31–17–11 (2)	Tony Vaccarelli	PTS	10	Sep 10, 1924	Henderson's Bowl, New York City, New York, U.S.	
60	Win	30–17–11 (2)	Allentown Johnny Leonard	PTS	12	Aug 4, 1924	Henderson's Bowl, New York City, New York, U.S.	
59	Win	29–17–11 (2)	Allentown Johnny Leonard	PTS	10	Jul 15, 1924	Henderson's Bowl, New York City, New York, U.S.	
58	Win	28–17–11 (2)	Vincent Martin	PTS	12	Jun 24, 1924	Nostrand A.C., New York City, New York, U.S.	
57	Win	27–17–11 (2)	Steve Sullivan	PTS	12	May 30, 1924	Henderson's Bowl, New York City, New York, U.S.	
56	Win	26–17–11 (2)	Joe Celmars	NWS	12	Apr 22, 1924	Strand Theatre, Bayonne, New Jersey, U.S.	
55	Win	25–17–11 (2)	Joe Ryder	PTS	12	Mar 14, 1924	Madison Square Garden, New York City, New York, U.S.	
54	Win	24–17–11 (2)	Joe Souza	PTS	10	Feb 21, 1924	Clermont Avenue Rink, New York City, New York, U.S.	
53	Win	23–17–11 (2)	Mickey Brown	PTS	10	Dec 28, 1923	Madison Square Garden, New York City, New York, U.S.	
52	Win	22–17–11 (2)	Al Markie	NWS	8	Nov 19, 1923	Arena, Philadelphia, Pennsylvania, U.S.	
51	Win	21–17–11 (2)	Joe Nelson	PTS	10	Aug 22, 1923	Velodrome, New York City, New York, U.S.	
50	Win	20–17–11 (2)	Joe O'Donnell	NWS	8	Jul 31, 1923	Shetzline Ballpark, Philadelphia, Pennsylvania, U.S.	
49	Win	19–17–11 (2)	Harry Foley	PTS	8	Jul 20, 1923	Mechanics Building, Boston, Massachusetts, U.S.	
48	Loss	18–17–11 (2)	Charley Goodman	PTS	6	Jun 18, 1923	Polo Grounds, New York City, New York, U.S.	
47	Loss	18–16–11 (2)	Cuddy DeMarco	NWS	10	May 28, 1923	Motor Square Garden, Pittsburgh, Pennsylvania, U.S.	
46	Draw	18–15–11 (2)	Cuddy DeMarco	NWS	8	Apr 30, 1923	Arena, Philadelphia, Pennsylvania, U.S.	
45	Loss	18–15–10 (2)	Bobby Wolgast	NWS	8	Mar 19, 1923	Arena, Philadelphia, Pennsylvania, U.S.	
44	Loss	18–14–10 (2)	Harvey Bright	PTS	10	Mar 16, 1923	Madison Square Garden, New York City, New York, U.S.	
43	Win	18–13–10 (2)	Billy Fitzsimmons	PTS	10	Feb 13, 1923	Mechanics Building, Boston, Massachusetts, U.S.	
42	Loss	17–13–10 (2)	Carl Tremaine	TKO	2 (12)	Jan 19, 1923	Madison Square Garden, New York City, New York, U.S.	
41	Draw	17–12–10 (2)	Frankie Jerome	PTS	12	Jan 5, 1923	Madison Square Garden, New York City, New York, U.S.	
40	Draw	17–12–9 (2)	Young Bud Ridley	PTS	6	Oct 25, 1922	Auditorium, Tacoma, Washington, U.S.	
39	Draw	17–12–8 (2)	Vic Foley	PTS	10	Oct 13, 1922	Arena, Vancouver, Canada	
38	Draw	17–12–7 (2)	Vic Foley	PTS	6	Sep 28, 1922	Auditorium, Tacoma, Washington, U.S.	
37	Draw	17–12–6 (2)	Sammy Gordon	PTS	6	Sep 14, 1922	Auditorium, Tacoma, Washington, U.S.	
36	Win	17–12–5 (2)	Ernie Daley	PTS	6	Sep 7, 1922	Legion Hall, Olympia, Washington, U.S.	
35	Loss	16–12–5 (2)	Mike DePinto	PTS	4	Jun 26, 1922	Fort Lewis, Washington, U.S.	
34	Draw	16–11–5 (2)	Mike DePinto	PTS	6	Jun 12, 1922	Aberdeen, Washington, U.S.	
33	Loss	16–11–4 (2)	Sammy Gordon	PTS	4	May 18, 1922	Auditorium, Tacoma, Washington, U.S.	
32	Win	16–10–4 (2)	Kid LaRose	PTS	4	May 4, 1922	Eagles Hall, Tacoma, Washington, U.S.	
31	Win	15–10–4 (2)	Frank Pantley	PTS	4	Apr 25, 1922	Arena, Seattle, Washington, U.S.	
30	Win	14–10–4 (2)	Soldier Toth	TKO	3	Mar 30, 1922	Camp Lewis, Washington, U.S.	Pacific Northwest Military elimination tournament
29	Win	13–10–4 (2)	Soldier Shea	TKO	3	Mar 28, 1922	Fort Lewis, Washington, U.S.	Pacific Northwest Military elimination tournament
28	Win	12–10–4 (2)	Mike Mitchell	PTS	4	Mar 23, 1922	Tacoma Washington, U.S.	
27	Loss	11–10–4 (2)	Mirillo Guida	PTS	8	Feb 22, 1922	Fort Lewis, Washington, U.S.	Fort Lewis's boxing elimination series
26	Win	11–9–4 (2)	Jimmy Cole	PTS	4	Feb 1, 1922	U.S.	Exact date and location unknown.
25	Win	10–9–4 (2)	Eddie Moore	PTS	6	Jan 12, 1922	Eagles Hall, Tacoma, Washington, U.S.	
24	Draw	9–9–4 (2)	Frankie Britt	PTS	6	Dec 29, 1921	Eagles A.C., Tacoma, Washington, U.S.	
23	Loss	9–9–3 (2)	Pancho Villa	PTS	20	Oct 5, 1921	Manila, Metro Manila, Philippines	
22	Draw	9–8–3 (2)	Pete Sarmiento	PTS	8	Sep 10, 1921	Olympic Stadium, Manila, Philippines	
21	Loss	9–8–2 (2)	Pancho Villa	PTS	20	Aug 23, 1921	Manila, Metro Manila, Philippines	
20	Loss	9–7–2 (2)	Cowboy Reyes	PTS	8	Aug 13, 1921	Olympic Stadium, Manila, Philippines	
19	Draw	9–6–2 (2)	Pancho Villa	PTS	15	Jul 25, 1921	Manila, Metro Manila, Philippines	
18	Loss	9–6–1 (2)	Pancho Villa	PTS	15	May 8, 1921	Manila, Metro Manila, Philippines	
17	Loss	9–5–1 (2)	Pancho Villa	PTS	10	Mar 5, 1921	Olympic Stadium, Manila, Philippines	
16	Win	9–4–1 (2)	Tip O'Neill	PTS	8	Feb 5, 1921	U.S.	Exact date and location unknown
15	Win	8–4–1 (2)	Young Givinni	KO	1	Feb 1, 1921	U.S.	Exact date and location unknown
14	Draw	7–4–1 (2)	Pancho Villa	PTS	15	Jan 10, 1921	Manila, Metro Manila, Philippines	
13	Loss	7–4 (2)	Irineo Flores	PTS	4	Jul 3, 1920	Olympic Stadium, Manila, Philippines	
12	Loss	7–3 (2)	Syd Keenan	PTS	8	Jul 1, 1920	U.S.	Exact date and location unknown
11	Win	7–2 (2)	Eddie Moore	PTS	10	Jun 20, 1920	U.S.	Exact date and location unknown
10	Win	6–2 (2)	Leoncio Bernabe	PTS	6	Jun 10, 1920	U.S.	Exact date and location unknown
9	Win	5–2 (2)	Kid Taylor	PTS	4	Jun 1, 1920	U.S.	Exact date and location unknown
8	Win	4–2 (2)	Kid Ponzo	PTS	4	May 1, 1920	U.S.	Exact date and location unknown
7	Loss	3–2 (2)	Pancho Villa	PTS	6	Apr 10, 1920	Manila, Metro Manila, Philippines	Exact date unknown
6	Win	3–1 (2)	Kid Saunders	PTS	4	Apr 1, 1920	U.S.	Exact date and location unknown
5	NC	2–1 (2)	Pancho Villa	NC	6 (6)	Mar 25, 1920	Manila, Metro Manila, Philippines	Exact date unknown
4	Loss	2–1 (1)	Pancho Villa	PTS	6	Mar 10, 1920	Manila, Metro Manila, Philippines	Exact date unknown
3	Win	2–0 (1)	Kid Aquila	PTS	4	Mar 1, 1920	U.S.	Exact date and location unknown
2	NC	1–0 (1)	Pancho Villa	NC	6 (6)	Feb 25, 1920	Manila, Metro Manila, Philippines	Exact date unknown
1	Win	1–0	Kid Ponzo	KO	3	Jan 1, 1920	U.S.	Exact date and location unknown

== Primary boxing achievements and honors ==
Achievements
Preceded by Steve "Kid" Sullivan	World Super Featherweight Champion; April 1, 1925 – December 2, 1925	Succeeded by Tod Morgan

Ballerino was inducted into the New Jersey Boxing Hall of Fame on September 12, 1971.

== See also ==
- List of super featherweight boxing champions
