= Steve Sullivan (boxer) =

American boxer (1897–1979)

Personal information
- Nicknames: "Kid" Sullivan; Steve "Kid" Sullivan
- Born: Steven John Tricamo; May 21, 1897 Brooklyn, New York, U.S.
- Died: September 6, 1979 (aged 82)
- Height: 5 ft 5 in (1.65 m)
- Weight: Super Featherweight; Jr. Lightweight

Boxing career
- Reach: 67.5 in (171 cm)
- Stance: Orthodox

Boxing record
- Total fights: 113
- Wins: 48
- Win by KO: 7
- Losses: 37
- Draws: 16

Steve "Kid" Sullivan (May 21, 1897 – September 6, 1979) was an American boxer who took the World Jr. Lightweight Title against Johnny Dundee on June 20, 1924, at the Henderson Bowl in Brooklyn, New York, in a ten-round points decision. Andy Neiderreiter, Joe Sarno, and Paddy Roche served as his managers during his career.

== Early career ==
Sullivan was born on May 21, 1897, in Brooklyn, New York, and resided there most of his life. He fought almost exclusively in the Brooklyn area from 1911 to 1914, though some of his earliest fights are not well documented by BoxRec. One source placed his earliest bouts around 1907–8.

Taking some time to gain prominence, he won a ten-round newspaper decision against well rated Jewish New York boxer Frankie Callahan at the Broadway Arena in Brooklyn on January 22, 1916. Callahan would fight five world champions in his short life, including being credited with a win against future world lightweight champion Benny Leonard the following year.

Sullivan fought Vincent "Pepper" Martin for the first time on April 1, 1916, at the Broadway Sports Club in Brooklyn, winning in a fourth-round knockout. He would fight Martin again on August 7, 1923, in Queens, New York, winning in an eighth round disqualification.

== Ramping up to the World Jr. Lightweight Championship ==
He fought the highly rated Sammy Sieger on January 22, 1923, at the Broadway Arena in Brooklyn, New York, losing in a twelve-round points decision. That Spring he would meet Charles "Dutch" Brandt twice, once on March 8, and once on May 5, 1923, winning in a twelve-round points decision and then achieving a twelve-round draw. Both Sieger and Brandt were well known, well rated boxers of his era. On December 17, 1923, he defeated Babe Herman at Madison Square Garden in an eighth-round decision. Herman was unable to continue the fight after receiving a broken rib in the eighth, and had to be carried from the ring.

== Taking the World Jr. Lightweight Title from Johnny Dundee ==
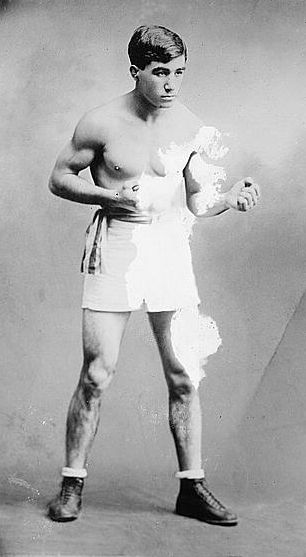
Johnny Dundee

Sullivan took the World Jr. Lightweight Title against reigning champion Johnny Dundee on June 20, 1924, at the Henderson Bowl in Brooklyn, New York, in a ten-round points decision. At 27, he achieved his most important victory in his hometown, and at an age when many boxers are at their peak of skill and physical conditioning.

On August 18, 1924, he defended his title against Vincent "Pepper" Martin in a fifteen-round points decision at the Queens Athletic Club in Queens, New York. There were no knockdowns, but "Martin was forced to cling to the ropes to support himself in the second round and was badly battered in the finish. Martin tried to rally in the fourteenth, but it was to no avail. It was Sullivan's first World Jr. Lightweight Title defense.

On October 15, 1924, he defended the title again against Mike Ballerino at Madison Square Garden, winning in a fifth round knockout. To many at ringside, Sullivan seemed to have considerably the better of the bout. The Evening News wrote that "Sullivan finished his man with sickening quickness...He (Ballerino) crumpled horribly..." Their return match, only a month later would demonstrate that Ballerino was still capable of showing his best skills.

== Losing the World Jr. Lightweight Title to Mike Ballerino ==
On December 15, 1924, he risked the title to Mike Ballerino at the Auditorium in Milwaukee, Wisconsin, in a ten-round newspaper decision. Had he not completed the full ten rounds, he could have lost the fight and the title.

In a World Jr. Lightweight rematch on April Fools' Day in 1925, he lost a Unanimous Decision to his frequent rival Mike Ballerino at the Armory in Philadelphia, Pennsylvania in a bout that went the full ten rounds. Several sources attribute Ballerino first taking the title from Sullivan at this bout, not his former bout with Sullivan in Milwaukee. One source wrote, "Ballerino took the lead at the opening of the fight and kept it up to the end, beating his foe in almost every round." Both judges agreed that Sullivan took only the first and seventh rounds.

On May 22, 1925, he received a technical knockout in the fifth round against Louis "Kid" Kaplan at Brassco Park in an important bout in Waterbury Connecticut. It was one of the very few times Sullivan would be knocked out in his ring career. Sullivan had previously lost to Kaplan on November 24, 1922, at Madison Square Garden in a twelve-round points decision.

On February 1, 1926, Sullivan won an easy decision over George Balduc in a slow ten round bout at the Broadway Arena in Brooklyn, New York. Sullivan was considered far from his best in the bout, being overly cautious and having taken a nine-month layoff. More significantly, the Brooklyn Daily Eagle wrote, "the Steve "Kid Sullivan", who received the decision after ten tiresome and uneventful rounds was but a thin shadow of the Steve Sullivan of old." They continued, the "veteran Brooklyn Italian is practically through...Tod Morgan...has little to fear at the former champion's hands."

On June 3, 1926, he fought Tod Morgan at the Brooklyn National League Baseball Park in front of 40,000 enthralled boxing fans. Sullivan lost in a sixth round Technical Knockout. The Oakland Tribune wrote Morgan dealt Sullivan one of the worst beatings a battler ever received in an Eastern Ring" The Wilkes-Barre Evening News, wrote "Tod Morgan... was not in the slightest danger of losing world's junior lightweight championship while fighting Steve Kid Sullivan at Ebbets Field last night". Sullivan was down for the count of nine in both the first and second rounds, allowing Morgan to gain a sizable lead in points. In the sixth round, Sullivan's handlers tossed in the towel. Sullivan, still standing, protested referee Jimmy Crowley's decision to end the bout. Sullivan's most apparent injuries were cuts to his nose.

Living a long life for a championship boxer of his era, he died at 82, on September 6, 1979.

== See also ==
- List of super featherweight boxing champions

Achievements
Preceded by Johnny Dundee	World Super Featherweight Champion; June 20, 1924 – April 1, 1925	Succeeded by Mike Ballerino
