= Pancho Villa (boxer) =

Filipino boxer (1901–1925)

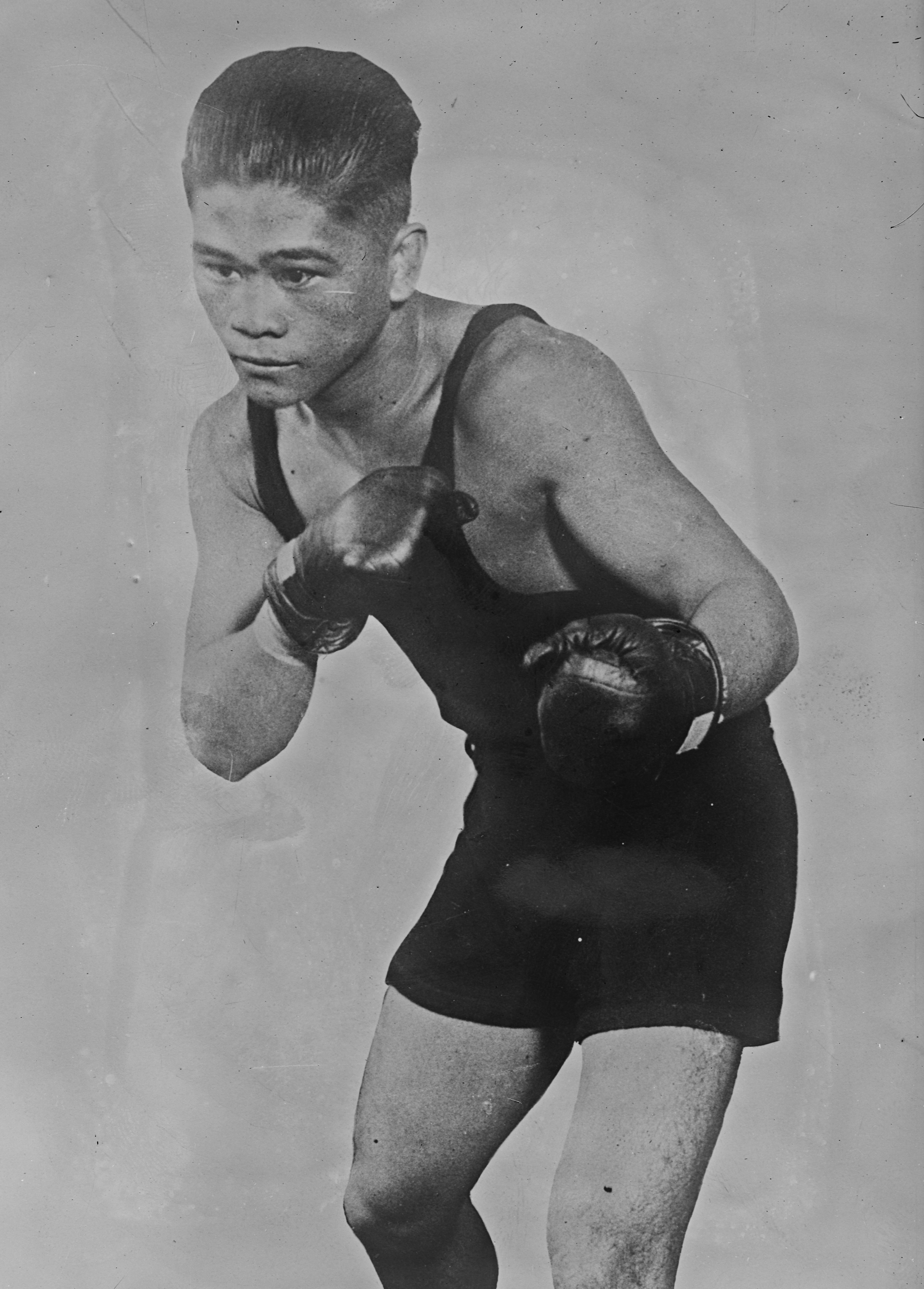

Personal information
- Nicknames: Pancho Villa; Filipino Whirlwind; Little Brown Boy
- Nationality: Filipino
- Born: Francisco Villaruel Guilledo; 1 August 1901 Ilog, Negros Occidental, Philippine Islands
- Died: 14 July 1925 (aged 23) San Francisco, California, U.S.
- Height: 5 ft 1 in (154 cm)
- Weight: Flyweight

Boxing career
- Stance: Orthodox

Boxing record
- Total fights: 104 (17 NWS)
- Wins: 90 (13 NWS)
- Win by KO: 22
- Losses: 8 (4 NWS)
- Draws: 4
- No contests: 2

Francisco Villaruel Guilledo (August 1, 1901 – July 14, 1925), commonly known as Pancho Villa, was a Filipino professional boxer. Villa, who stood only 5 feet and 1 inch (154 cm) tall and never weighed more than 114 pounds (51 kg), despite the racial discrimination of that time, rose from obscurity to become the first Asian to win the World Flyweight Championship in 1923, earning the reputation in some quarters as one of the greatest Flyweight boxers in history. Villa is widely regarded as one of the greatest Filipino boxers of all time alongside Manny Pacquiao and Gabriel Elorde. He was never knocked out in his entire boxing career, which ended with his sudden death at only twenty-three from complications following a tooth extraction.

== Early life and Philippine boxing career ==
Guilledo was born on August 1, 1901, in Ilog, Negros Occidental, the son of a cowhand who abandoned his family when Guilledo was just six months old. He grew up in the hacienda of a wealthy local, helping his mother raise goats she tended on the farm.

When Guilledo was 11, he sailed to Iloilo City to work as a bootblack. While in Iloilo, he befriended a local boxer and together they migrated to Manila, settling in Tondo. He would occasionally spar with friends and soon attracted the attention of local boxing habitués. He fought his first professional fight in 1919 against Alberto Castro. Within two years, he was the Philippine Flyweight Champion, having dethroned Terio Pandong. He nearly gave up boxing after being spurned by a woman he courted, actually returning to Negros early in 1922 to retire. The clamor of Filipino boxing fans compelled him to return to the ring.

It appears that during this period, Guilledo was under the tutelage of at least two important local boxing figures. One was the American boxing promoter based in Manila, Frank E. Churchill. Another was a Filipino ice plant executive and boxing manager named Paquito Villa. The renaming of Francisco Guilledo to Pancho Villa has been attributed to both men, depending on the source. One version tags Churchill as having renamed Guilledo into Villa, taking the name from the Mexican guerrilla leader. Another version maintains that Paquito Villa had legally adopted Guilledo as early as 1918, renaming him Pancho.

Not long before coming to America, he met future American World Junior Lightweight Champion Mike Ballerino nine times in Manila between January 1920, and October 1921 defeating him in six bouts. Ballerino would also be managed by Frank Churchill after coming to America.

== World Flyweight Champion ==
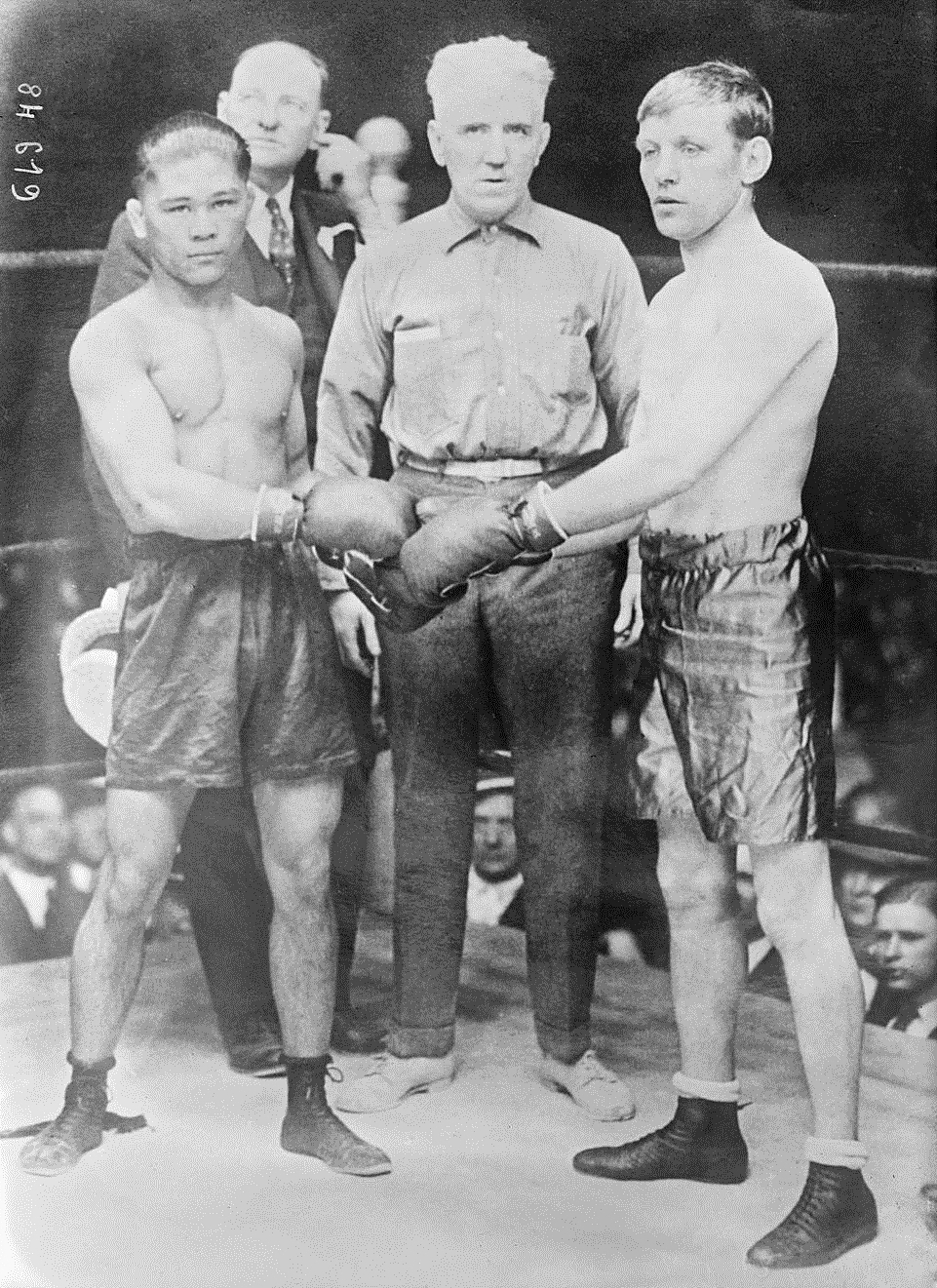
Pancho Villa (left) vs. Jimmy Wilde (right)

In May, 1922, Villa received an invitation from famed boxing promoter Tex Rickard to fight in the United States. He accepted the invitation and sailed to America together with Churchill and Paquito Villa. Upon arrival he was set up with a very young but talented sparring partner in Enrique Chaffardet and immediately won his first overseas fight against Abe Goldstein in Jersey City on June 7, 1922. He then fought and was defeated by Frankie Genaro on August 22, 1922. By this time, Villa had caught the attention of boxing aficionados and he was slated to fight against the American Flyweight Champion Johnny Buff on September 15, 1922.

Villa defeated Buff in an upset, knocking out the champion in the 11th round to win the American Flyweight Championship. At this point, Villa had been in the American phase of his career for only 4 months. Villa lost the title early the following year to Genaro, who defeated the Filipino on points in a widely criticized decision. The unpopularity of Villa's defeat on points proved fateful. Jimmy Wilde, the Welsh-born boxer and former World Flyweight Champion, had decided to end his recent retirement and seek the then vacant World Flyweight Championship in a fight to be staged in America. While Genaro, the American Champion, seemed as the logical choice to fight Wilde, Villa's growing popularity soon convinced promoters that the Filipino would prove as the better draw.

In what were described in that era as "pre-battle statements," the 31-year-old Wilde said: ~"I appreciate the fact that in Villa, I am going to meet one of the toughest little men in boxing. I appreciate the fact that I am going to be put to a real test, and that is what I have prepared for." In comments that summed up his fighting style, Villa said: ~"I am in condition and once in condition, my worries are over. I do not intend to give Wilde a minute's rest while we are in the ring."

Villa did not disappoint the ever pleasing crowd. On June 18, 1923, at the Polo Grounds in New York City, Villa was cheered on to victory over Wilde by more than 20,000 fans screaming "Viva Villa!" The win came by knockout in the 7th round, caused by a crashing right to Wilde's jaw. Villa was described as relentless, pummeling Wilde with both hands and causing the Welshman to also drop in the fourth and fifth rounds. Wilde never fought again.

His wife Gliceria (née Concepcion) who was left in Manila, asked by the media outfits for reaction had this to say: "You cannot imagine the happiness I felt upon receiving the first notices of the victory of my husband. I cried not because of pain but emotion. I was hoping for his triumph."

Former President General Emilio Aguinaldo, voicing the sentiment of the entire nation said: "Congratulations, Pancho, Come back to us and defend your title here."

A hero's welcome greeted Pancho when he disembarked from the SS President Grant, the same luxury liner that brought him to the United States on April 2, 1922 to launch his campaign in the land of promise.

A reception at the Malacanan Palace hosted by then President Manuel Quezon followed a massive parade from the airport passing through Manila's major streets where thousands greeted the returning sports hero.

The new World Flyweight Champion successfully defended his title several times and never relinquished it until his death just two years later. Villa returned to a hero's welcome in Manila in September 1924, feted with a parade and a reception at Malacañan Palace. He also returned to his old haunts in Iloilo and his hometown in Negros Occidental. Before returning to the United States, he fought one more bout in Manila, against Clever Sencio, on May 2, 1925. Villa prevailed. None of the thousands of fans who saw that fight at Wallace Field knew that they had just witnessed Villa's final victory and the second to the last fight of his life.

== Death ==
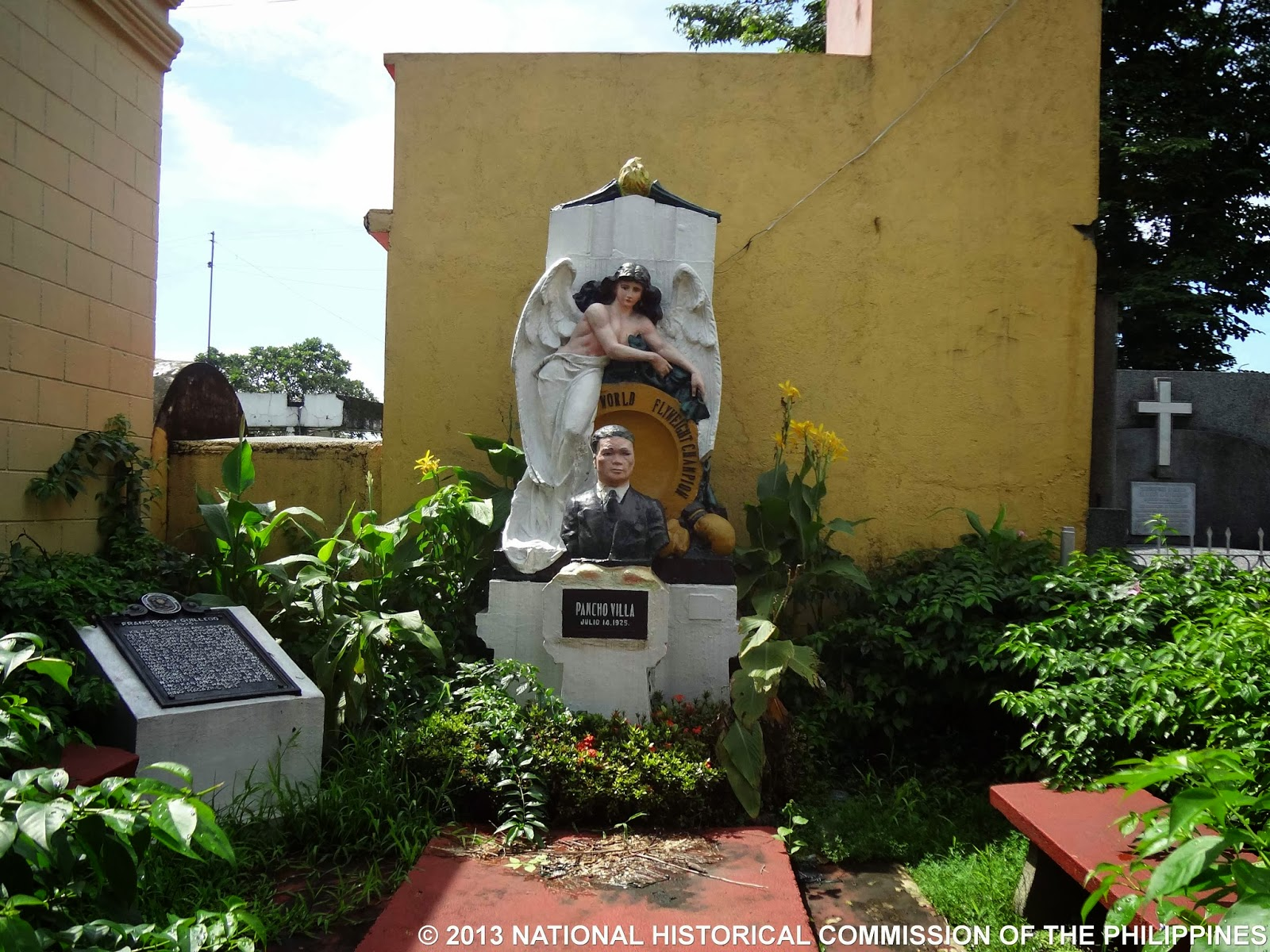
Francisco Guilledo historical marker.

Villa returned to the United States to prepare for his next match, a non-title fight against Jimmy McLarnin scheduled for July 4, 1925, at Ewing Field in San Francisco. In the days leading to the fight, Villa's face became swollen due to an ulcerated tooth. According to contemporary newspaper accounts, on the morning of the fight, Villa went to a dentist to have the tooth extracted. Despite the pain and swelling, Villa insisted on going ahead with the fight with McLarnin. Villa ended up spending most of the fight using one hand to protect his afflicted face. Given these circumstances, Villa naturally lost, though he managed to stay the distance. It was to be Villa's last fight.

Two or three days after the McLarnin fight, he had three more teeth extracted after an infection was discovered. Against his dentist's prescription of bed rest, Villa spent the next few days carousing with friends. His condition worsened, and by July 13, 1925, he had to be rushed to the hospital. It was discovered that the infection had spread to his throat, resulting in Ludwig's angina. Villa was rushed into surgery, but he lapsed into a coma while on the table and died the following day, July 14, 1925, 17 days before his 24th birthday.

His remains were returned to Manila, and in August 1925, he was buried at Manila North Cemetery.

On June 24, 2024, it was posted in Viva Filipinas Facebook account because his memorial grave seems to be rotting as time passes by. He is now renowned as the “forgotten champion” in the Philippines.

== Family ==
His younger half-brother, Eulogio Villaruel Tingson also known as "Little Pancho", was a professional boxer who compiled a record of 103(19 KO)–18–26 with 1 No Contest.

== Honors ==
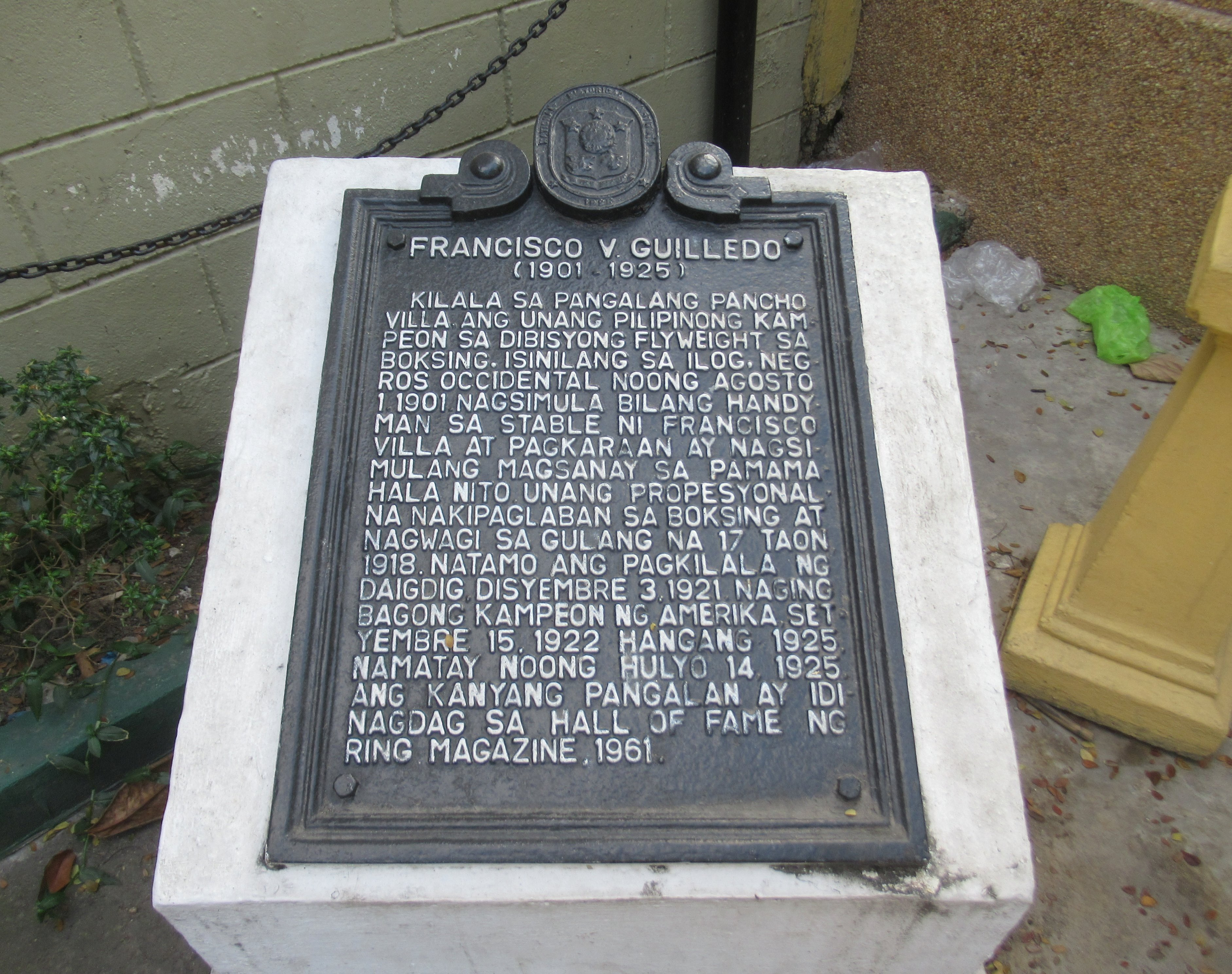
Pancho Villa NHCP Historical Marker at Manila North Cemetery.

Villa's 1923 victory made him the first Asian in history to have won an international boxing championship. In October 1961, Villa was added by Ring Magazine to its own boxing hall of fame. He was inducted belatedly into the International Boxing Hall of Fame in 1994, the second Filipino boxer so honored after Gabriel "Flash" Elorde, who was born nearly a decade after Villa's death.

Villa was ranked the 59th best fighter by Ring Magazine in 2002 in a list of the 80 Best Fighters of the Last 80 Years.

He was voted as the #1 flyweight (along with Miguel Canto) of the 20th century by the Associated Press in 1999.

== Professional boxing record ==
All information in this section is derived from BoxRec, unless otherwise stated.

=== Official record ===
104 fights	77 wins	4 losses
By knockout	22	0
By decision	55	3
By disqualification	0	1
Draws	4	
No contests	2	
Newspaper decisions/draws	17	

All newspaper decisions are officially regarded as “no decision” bouts and are not counted in the win/loss/draw column.

No.	Result	Record	Opponent	Type	Round, time	Date	Location	Notes
104	Loss	77–4–4 (19)	Jimmy McLarnin	PTS	10	Jul 4, 1925	Oaks Ballpark, Emeryville, California, U.S.	
103	Win	77–3–4 (19)	Clever Sencio	UD	15	May 2, 1925	Wallace Field, Manila, Philippines	Retained NBA, NYSAC, and The Ring flyweight titles
102	Win	76–3–4 (19)	Francisco Pilapil	KO	8 (15)	Mar 9, 1925	Iloilo City, Philippines	
101	Win	75–3–4 (19)	Amos 'Kid' Carlin	NWS	15	Aug 18, 1924	Coliseum Arena, New Orleans, Louisiana, U.S.	
100	Win	75–3–4 (18)	Frankie Murray	NWS	6	Jul 28, 1924	Bacharach Ball Park, Atlantic City, New Jersey, U.S.	
99	Win	75–3–4 (17)	Willie Woods	PTS	10	Jul 21, 1924	Mechanics Building, Boston, Massachusetts, U.S.	
98	Win	74–3–4 (17)	Henny Catena	KO	5 (12), 1:58	Jul 2, 1924	Playgrounds Stadium, West New York, New Jersey, U.S.	
97	Win	73–3–4 (17)	Charles 'Bud' Taylor	UD	12	Jun 10, 1924	Henderson's Bowl, New York City, New York, U.S.	
96	Win	72–3–4 (17)	Frankie Ash	UD	15	May 30, 1924	Henderson's Bowl, New York City, New York, U.S.	Retained NBA, NYSAC, and The Ring flyweight titles
95	Draw	71–3–4 (17)	Eddie McKenna	PTS	10	Mar 23, 1924	Public Hall, Cleveland, Ohio, U.S.	
94	Win	71–3–3 (17)	Billy Bonillas	NWS	4	Mar 22, 1924	10th Street Arena, Modesto, California, U.S.	
93	Win	71–3–3 (16)	Georgie Lee	PTS	4	Mar 21, 1924	L Street Arena, Sacramento, California, U.S.	
92	Loss	70–3–3 (16)	Charles 'Bud' Taylor	NWS	10	Mar 6, 1924	Auditorium, Milwaukee, Wisconsin, U.S.	
91	Win	70–3–3 (15)	George Marks	UD	15	Feb 8, 1924	Madison Square Garden, New York City, New York, U.S.	
90	Win	69–3–3 (15)	Midget Mike Moran	UD	10	Jan 21, 1924	Motor Square Garden, Pittsburgh, Pennsylvania, U.S.	
89	Win	68–3–3 (15)	Tony Norman	PTS	10	Jan 1, 1924	Motor Square Garden, Pittsburgh, Pennsylvania, U.S.	
88	Win	67–3–3 (15)	Patsy Wallace	PTS	10	Dec 10, 1923	Arena, Philadelphia, Pennsylvania, U.S.	
87	Win	66–3–3 (15)	Donnie Mack	KO	4 (10)	Dec 5, 1923	Coliseum, Toronto, Ontario, Canada	
86	Win	65–3–3 (15)	Joey Schwartz	NWS	10	Nov 19, 1923	Danceland Arena, Detroit, Michigan, U.S.	
85	Win	65–3–3 (14)	Jabez White	NWS	8	Oct 22, 1923	Arena, Philadelphia, Pennsylvania, U.S.	
84	Win	65–3–3 (13)	Benny Schwartz	PTS	15	Oct 12, 1923	5th Regiment Armory, Baltimore, Maryland, U.S.	Retained NBA, NYSAC, and The Ring flyweight titles
83	Win	64–3–3 (13)	Tony Thomas	PTS	10	Sep 24, 1923	Mechanics Building, Boston, Massachusetts, U.S.	
82	Win	63–3–3 (13)	Charles 'Bud' Taylor	NWS	10	Sep 8, 1923	Hawthorne Race Course, Chicago, Illinois, U.S.	
81	Win	63–3–3 (12)	Jackie Feldman	KO	3 (10)	Aug 22, 1923	Velodrome, New York City, New York, U.S.	
80	Win	62–3–3 (12)	Kid Williams	NWS	8	Jul 31, 1923	Shetzline Ballpark, Philadelphia, Pennsylvania, U.S.	
79	Win	62–3–3 (11)	Abe Friedman	PTS	10	Jul 20, 1923	Mechanics Building, Boston, Massachusetts, U.S.	
78	Win	61–3–3 (11)	Jimmy Wilde	KO	7 (15)	Jun 18, 1923	Polo Grounds, New York City, New York, U.S.	Won NBA and inaugural NYSAC and The Ring flyweight titles
77	Loss	60–3–3 (11)	Bobby Wolgast	NWS	8	May 24, 1923	Shibe Park, Philadelphia, Pennsylvania, U.S.	
76	Win	60–3–3 (10)	Battling Al Murray	NWS	10	May 11, 1923	Dexter Park Pavilion, Chicago, Illinois, U.S.	
75	Win	60–3–3 (9)	Clarence Rosen	NWS	10	Apr 23, 1923	Danceland Arena, Detroit, Michigan, U.S.	
74	Win	60–3–3 (8)	Willie Darcy	PTS	12	Mar 24, 1923	State Armory, Waterbury, Connecticut, U.S.	
73	Win	59–3–3 (8)	Young Montreal	NWS	8	Mar 19, 1923	Arena, Philadelphia, Pennsylvania, U.S.	
72	Loss	59–3–3 (7)	Frankie Genaro	SD	15	Mar 1, 1923	Madison Square Garden, New York City, New York, U.S.	Lost American flyweight title
71	Win	59–2–3 (7)	Henry 'Kid' Wolfe	KO	3 (8)	Feb 20, 1923	Arena, Philadelphia, Pennsylvania, U.S.	
70	Win	58–2–3 (7)	Frankie Mason	KO	5 (10)	Feb 13, 1923	Mechanics Building, Boston, Massachusetts, U.S.	Retained American flyweight title
69	Win	57–2–3 (7)	Battling Al Murray	NWS	8	Jan 1, 1923	Arena, Philadelphia, Pennsylvania, U.S.	
68	Win	57–2–3 (6)	Terry Martin	UD	15	Dec 29, 1922	Madison Square Garden, New York City, New York, U.S.	
67	Win	56–2–3 (6)	Young Montreal	PTS	10	Nov 27, 1922	Arena, Boston, Massachusetts, U.S.	
66	Win	55–2–3 (6)	Abe Goldstein	UD	15	Nov 16, 1922	Madison Square Garden, New York City, New York, U.S.	
65	Win	54–2–3 (6)	Patsy Wallace	NWS	8	Oct 30, 1922	Olympia A.C., Philadelphia, Pennsylvania, U.S.	
64	Win	54–2–3 (5)	Danny Edwards	PTS	10	Oct 23, 1922	Arena, Boston, Massachusetts, U.S.	
63	Win	53–2–3 (5)	Johnny Buff	TKO	11 (12), 0:27	Sep 14, 1922	Ebbets Field, New York City, New York, U.S.	Won American flyweight title
62	Loss	52–2–3 (5)	Frankie Genaro	PTS	10	Aug 22, 1922	Ebbets Field, New York City, New York, U.S.	
61	Win	52–1–3 (5)	Sammy Cohen	PTS	8	Aug 15, 1922	Ebbets Field, New York City, New York, U.S.	
60	Win	51–1–3 (5)	Johnny Hepburn	PTS	6	Aug 2, 1922	Ebbets Field, New York City, New York, U.S.	
59	Win	50–1–3 (5)	Terry Miller	NWS	12	Jul 29, 1922	Asbury Park, New Jersey, U.S.	
58	Win	50–1–3 (4)	Frankie Murray	PTS	6	Jul 19, 1922	Margolies A.C., Averne, New York City, New York, U.S.	
57	Loss	49–1–3 (4)	Frankie Genaro	NWS	12	Jul 6, 1922	Oakland A.A., Jersey City, New Jersey, U.S.	
56	Loss	49–1–3 (3)	Abe Goldstein	NWS	12	Jun 7, 1922	Oakland A.A., Jersey City, New Jersey, U.S.	
55	Win	49–1–3 (2)	Pete Sarmiento	PTS	15	Apr 1, 1922	Manila, Philippines	
54	Win	48–1–3 (2)	Max Mason	KO	4 (?)	Mar 19, 1922	Iloilo City, Philippines	
53	Win	47–1–3 (2)	Georgie Lee	PTS	15	Feb 12, 1922	Manila, Philippines	
52	Win	46–1–3 (2)	Kid Abayan	PTS	8	Jan 12, 1922	Manila, Philippines	
51	Win	45–1–3 (2)	Battling Ongay	KO	1 (?)	Dec 29, 1921	Manila, Philippines	
50	Win	44–1–3 (2)	Jimmy Taylor	PTS	8	Dec 15, 1921	Grand Opera House, Manila, Philippines	
49	Win	43–1–3 (2)	George Mendies	KO	3 (10)	Dec 8, 1921	Olympic Stadium, Manila, Philippines	
48	Win	42–1–3 (2)	Kid Garcia	PTS	8	Nov 17, 1921	Manila, Philippines	
47	Win	41–1–3 (2)	Kid Aquila	PTS	8	Nov 10, 1921	Manila, Philippines	
46	Win	40–1–3 (2)	Kid Aquila	PTS	8	Oct 19, 1921	Manila, Philippines	
45	Win	39–1–3 (2)	Mike Ballerino	PTS	20	Oct 5, 1921	Manila, Philippines	
44	Win	38–1–3 (2)	Leoncio Bernabe	PTS	8	Sep 21, 1921	Manila, Philippines	
43	Win	37–1–3 (2)	Syd Keenan	PTS	8	Sep 7, 1921	Manila, Philippines	
42	Win	36–1–3 (2)	Desiderio 'Cowboy' Reyes	PTS	15	Sep 3, 1921	Olympic Stadium, Manila, Philippines	Won vacant Oriental bantamweight title
41	Win	35–1–3 (2)	Mike Ballerino	PTS	20	Aug 23, 1921	Manila, Philippines	
40	Loss	34–1–3 (2)	Eddie Moore	DQ	10 (?)	Aug 9, 1921	Manila, Philippines	
39	Draw	34–0–3 (2)	Mike Ballerino	PTS	15	Jul 25, 1921	Manila, Philippines	
38	Win	34–0–2 (2)	Young Modejar	PTS	6	Jul 11, 1921	Manila, Philippines	
37	Draw	33–0–2 (2)	Leoncio Bernabe	PTS	6	Jun 20, 1921	Manila, Philippines	
36	Win	33–0–1 (2)	Pete Alberto	PTS	8	Jun 6, 1921	Manila, Philippines	
35	Win	32–0–1 (2)	Knockout Lewis	KO	4 (?)	May 22, 1921	Manila, Philippines	
34	Win	31–0–1 (2)	Mike Ballerino	PTS	15	May 8, 1921	Manila, Philippines	
33	Win	30–0–1 (2)	Stiff Irineo	KO	2 (?)	Apr 24, 1921	Manila, Philippines	
32	Win	29–0–1 (2)	Kid Garcia	PTS	8	Apr 10, 1921	Manila, Philippines	
31	Win	28–0–1 (2)	Timoteo Santos	KO	7 (?)	Mar 26, 1921	Olympic Stadium, Manila, Philippines	
30	Win	27–0–1 (2)	Mike Ballerino	PTS	10	Mar 5, 1921	Olympic Stadium, Manila, Philippines	
29	Win	26–0–1 (2)	Terio Pandong	PTS	8	Feb 21, 1921	Manila, Philippines	
28	Win	25–0–1 (2)	Kid Moro	KO	3 (?)	Feb 7, 1921	Manila, Philippines	
27	Win	24–0–1 (2)	Sailor Johnny Candelaria	KO	4 (?)	Jan 23, 1921	Manila, Philippines	
26	Draw	23–0–1 (2)	Mike Ballerino	PTS	15	Jan 10, 1921	Manila, Philippines	
25	Win	23–0 (2)	Stiff Irineo	PTS	6	Jul 10, 1920	Manila, Philippines	Precise date unknown at this time
24	Win	22–0 (2)	Kid Cortez	PTS	6	Jun 10, 1920	Manila, Philippines	Precise date unknown at this time
23	Win	21–0 (2)	Sailor Johnny Candelaria	PTS	6	May 10, 1920	Manila, Philippines	Precise date unknown at this time
22	Win	20–0 (2)	Mike Ballerino	PTS	6	Apr 10, 1920	Manila, Philippines	Precise date unknown at this time
21	ND	19–0 (2)	Mike Ballerino	ND	6	Mar 25, 1920	Manila, Philippines	Precise date unknown at this time
20	Win	19–0 (1)	Mike Ballerino	PTS	6	Mar 10, 1920	Manila, Philippines	Precise date unknown at this time
19	ND	18–0 (1)	Mike Ballerino	ND	6	Feb 25, 1920	Manila, Philippines	Precise date unknown at this time
18	Win	18–0	Jose de la Cruz	PTS	6	Feb 10, 1920	Manila, Philippines	Precise date unknown at this time
17	Win	17–0	Pedro Capitan	KO	4 (?)	Jan 1, 1920	Manila, Philippines	Precise date unknown at this time
16	Win	16–0	Baguio Bearcat	PTS	4	Nov 10, 1919	Manila, Philippines	Precise date unknown at this time
15	Win	15–0	Baguio Bearcat	PTS	4	Oct 10, 1919	Manila, Philippines	Precise date unknown at this time
14	Win	14–0	Pedro Olongapo	PTS	4	Sep 10, 1919	Olympic Stadium, Manila, Philippines	Precise date unknown at this time
13	Win	13–0	Jose de la Cruz	PTS	4	Aug 10, 1919	Manila, Philippines	Precise date unknown at this time
12	Win	12–0	Kid Elino	PTS	4	Jul 10, 1919	Manila, Philippines	Precise date unknown at this time
11	Win	11–0	Young Duarte	PTS	4	Jun 10, 1919	Manila, Philippines	Precise date unknown at this time
10	Win	10–0	Young Edwards	PTS	4	May 10, 1919	Manila, Philippines	Precise date unknown at this time
9	Win	9–0	Jose Mendoza	KO	2 (?)	May 1, 1919	Manila, Philippines	Precise date unknown at this time
8	Win	8–0	Pete Alberto	PTS	4	Apr 10, 1919	Manila, Philippines	Precise date unknown at this time
7	Win	7–0	Kid Moro	KO	2 (?)	Apr 1, 1919	Manila, Philippines	Precise date unknown at this time
6	Win	6–0	Kid Cortez	PTS	4	Mar 10, 1919	Manila, Philippines	Precise date unknown at this time
5	Win	5–0	Jamie Desiderio	KO	2 (?)	Mar 1, 1919	Olympic Stadium, Manila, Philippines	Precise date unknown at this time
4	Win	4–0	Terio Pandong	PTS	4	Feb 10, 1919	Manila, Philippines	Precise date unknown at this time
3	Win	3–0	Cesareo Siguion	KO	2 (?)	Feb 1, 1919	Palomar Pavilion, Manila, Philippines	Precise date unknown at this time
2	Win	2–0	Kid Castro	PTS	5	Jan 10, 1919	Manila, Philippines	Precise date unknown at this time
1	Win	1–0	Alberto Castro	KO	3 (?)	Jan 1, 1919	Manila, Philippines	

=== Unofficial record ===
104 fights	90 wins	8 losses
By knockout	22	0
By decision	68	7
By disqualification	0	1
Draws	4	
No contests	2	

Record with the inclusion of newspaper decisions in the win/loss/draw column.

No.	Result	Record	Opponent	Type	Round	Date	Location	Notes
104	Loss	90–8–4 (2)	Jimmy McLarnin	PTS	10	Jul 4, 1925	Oaks Ballpark, Emeryville, California, U.S.	
103	Win	90–7–4 (2)	Clever Sencio	UD	15	May 2, 1925	Wallace Field, Manila, Philippines	Retained NBA, NYSAC, and The Ring flyweight titles
102	Win	89–7–4 (2)	Francisco Pilapil	KO	8 (15)	Mar 9, 1925	Iloilo City, Philippines	
101	Win	88–7–4 (2)	Amos 'Kid' Carlin	NWS	15	Aug 18, 1924	Coliseum Arena, New Orleans, Louisiana, U.S.	
100	Win	87–7–4 (2)	Frankie Murray	NWS	6	Jul 28, 1924	Bacharach Ball Park, Atlantic City, New Jersey, U.S.	
99	Win	86–7–4 (2)	Willie Woods	PTS	10	Jul 21, 1924	Mechanics Building, Boston, Massachusetts, U.S.	
98	Win	85–7–4 (2)	Henny Catena	KO	5 (12), 1:58	Jul 2, 1924	Playgrounds Stadium, West New York, New Jersey, U.S.	
97	Win	84–7–4 (2)	Charles 'Bud' Taylor	UD	12	Jun 10, 1924	Henderson's Bowl, New York City, New York, U.S.	
96	Win	83–7–4 (2)	Frankie Ash	UD	15	May 30, 1924	Henderson's Bowl, New York City, New York, U.S.	Retained NBA, NYSAC, and The Ring flyweight titles
95	Draw	82–7–4 (2)	Eddie McKenna	PTS	10	Mar 23, 1924	Public Hall, Cleveland, Ohio, U.S.	
94	Win	82–7–3 (2)	Billy Bonillas	NWS	4	Mar 22, 1924	10th Street Arena, Modesto, California, U.S.	
93	Win	81–7–3 (2)	Georgie Lee	PTS	4	Mar 21, 1924	L Street Arena, Sacramento, California, U.S.	
92	Loss	80–7–3 (2)	Charles 'Bud' Taylor	NWS	10	Mar 6, 1924	Auditorium, Milwaukee, Wisconsin, U.S.	
91	Win	80–6–3 (2)	George Marks	UD	15	Feb 8, 1924	Madison Square Garden, New York City, New York, U.S.	
90	Win	79–6–3 (2)	Midget Mike Moran	UD	10	Jan 21, 1924	Motor Square Garden, Pittsburgh, Pennsylvania, U.S.	
89	Win	78–6–3 (2)	Tony Norman	PTS	10	Jan 1, 1924	Motor Square Garden, Pittsburgh, Pennsylvania, U.S.	
88	Win	77–6–3 (2)	Patsy Wallace	PTS	10	Dec 10, 1923	Arena, Philadelphia, Pennsylvania, U.S.	
87	Win	76–6–3 (2)	Donnie Mack	KO	4 (10)	Dec 5, 1923	Coliseum, Toronto, Ontario, Canada	
86	Win	75–6–3 (2)	Joey Schwartz	NWS	10	Nov 19, 1923	Danceland Arena, Detroit, Michigan, U.S.	
85	Win	74–6–3 (2)	Jabez White	NWS	8	Oct 22, 1923	Arena, Philadelphia, Pennsylvania, U.S.	
84	Win	73–6–3 (2)	Benny Schwartz	PTS	15	Oct 12, 1923	5th Regiment Armory, Baltimore, Maryland, U.S.	Retained NBA, NYSAC, and The Ring flyweight titles
83	Win	72–6–3 (2)	Tony Thomas	PTS	10	Sep 24, 1923	Mechanics Building, Boston, Massachusetts, U.S.	
82	Win	71–6–3 (2)	Charles 'Bud' Taylor	NWS	10	Sep 8, 1923	Hawthorne Race Course, Chicago, Illinois, U.S.	
81	Win	70–6–3 (2)	Jackie Feldman	KO	3 (10)	Aug 22, 1923	Velodrome, New York City, New York, U.S.	
80	Win	69–6–3 (2)	Kid Williams	NWS	8	Jul 31, 1923	Shetzline Ballpark, Philadelphia, Pennsylvania, U.S.	
79	Win	68–6–3 (2)	Abe Friedman	PTS	10	Jul 20, 1923	Mechanics Building, Boston, Massachusetts, U.S.	
78	Win	67–6–3 (2)	Jimmy Wilde	KO	7 (15)	Jun 18, 1923	Polo Grounds, New York City, New York, U.S.	Won NBA and inaugural NYSAC and The Ring flyweight titles
77	Loss	66–6–3 (2)	Bobby Wolgast	NWS	8	May 24, 1923	Shibe Park, Philadelphia, Pennsylvania, U.S.	
76	Win	66–5–3 (2)	Battling Al Murray	NWS	10	May 11, 1923	Dexter Park Pavilion, Chicago, Illinois, U.S.	
75	Win	65–5–3 (2)	Clarence Rosen	NWS	10	Apr 23, 1923	Danceland Arena, Detroit, Michigan, U.S.	
74	Win	64–5–3 (2)	Willie Darcy	PTS	12	Mar 24, 1923	State Armory, Waterbury, Connecticut, U.S.	
73	Win	63–5–3 (2)	Young Montreal	NWS	8	Mar 19, 1923	Arena, Philadelphia, Pennsylvania, U.S.	
72	Loss	62–5–3 (2)	Frankie Genaro	SD	15	Mar 1, 1923	Madison Square Garden, New York City, New York, U.S.	Lost American flyweight title
71	Win	62–4–3 (2)	Henry 'Kid' Wolfe	KO	3 (8)	Feb 20, 1923	Arena, Philadelphia, Pennsylvania, U.S.	
70	Win	61–4–3 (2)	Frankie Mason	KO	5 (10)	Feb 13, 1923	Mechanics Building, Boston, Massachusetts, U.S.	Retained American flyweight title
69	Win	60–4–3 (2)	Battling Al Murray	NWS	8	Jan 1, 1923	Arena, Philadelphia, Pennsylvania, U.S.	
68	Win	59–4–3 (2)	Terry Martin	UD	15	Dec 29, 1922	Madison Square Garden, New York City, New York, U.S.	
67	Win	58–4–3 (2)	Young Montreal	PTS	10	Nov 27, 1922	Arena, Boston, Massachusetts, U.S.	
66	Win	57–4–3 (2)	Abe Goldstein	UD	15	Nov 16, 1922	Madison Square Garden, New York City, New York, U.S.	
65	Win	56–4–3 (2)	Patsy Wallace	NWS	8	Oct 30, 1922	Olympia A.C., Philadelphia, Pennsylvania, U.S.	
64	Win	55–4–3 (2)	Danny Edwards	PTS	10	Oct 23, 1922	Arena, Boston, Massachusetts, U.S.	
63	Win	54–4–3 (2)	Johnny Buff	TKO	11 (12), 0:27	Sep 14, 1922	Ebbets Field, New York City, New York, U.S.	Won American flyweight title
62	Loss	53–4–3 (2)	Frankie Genaro	PTS	10	Aug 22, 1922	Ebbets Field, New York City, New York, U.S.	
61	Win	53–3–3 (2)	Sammy Cohen	PTS	8	Aug 15, 1922	Ebbets Field, New York City, New York, U.S.	
60	Win	52–3–3 (2)	Johnny Hepburn	PTS	6	Aug 2, 1922	Ebbets Field, New York City, New York, U.S.	
59	Win	51–3–3 (2)	Terry Miller	NWS	12	Jul 29, 1922	Asbury Park, New Jersey, U.S.	
58	Win	50–3–3 (2)	Frankie Murray	PTS	6	Jul 19, 1922	Margolies A.C., Averne, New York City, New York, U.S.	
57	Loss	49–3–3 (2)	Frankie Genaro	NWS	12	Jul 6, 1922	Oakland A.A., Jersey City, New Jersey, U.S.	
56	Loss	49–2–3 (2)	Abe Goldstein	NWS	12	Jun 7, 1922	Oakland A.A., Jersey City, New Jersey, U.S.	
55	Win	49–1–3 (2)	Pete Sarmiento	PTS	15	Apr 1, 1922	Manila, Philippines	
54	Win	48–1–3 (2)	Max Mason	KO	4 (?)	Mar 19, 1922	Iloilo City, Philippines	
53	Win	47–1–3 (2)	Georgie Lee	PTS	15	Feb 12, 1922	Manila, Philippines	
52	Win	46–1–3 (2)	Kid Abayan	PTS	8	Jan 12, 1922	Manila, Philippines	
51	Win	45–1–3 (2)	Battling Ongay	KO	1 (?)	Dec 29, 1921	Manila, Philippines	
50	Win	44–1–3 (2)	Jimmy Taylor	PTS	8	Dec 15, 1921	Grand Opera House, Manila, Philippines	
49	Win	43–1–3 (2)	George Mendies	KO	3 (10)	Dec 8, 1921	Olympic Stadium, Manila, Philippines	
48	Win	42–1–3 (2)	Kid Garcia	PTS	8	Nov 17, 1921	Manila, Philippines	
47	Win	41–1–3 (2)	Kid Aquila	PTS	8	Nov 10, 1921	Manila, Philippines	
46	Win	40–1–3 (2)	Kid Aquila	PTS	8	Oct 19, 1921	Manila, Philippines	
45	Win	39–1–3 (2)	Mike Ballerino	PTS	20	Oct 5, 1921	Manila, Philippines	
44	Win	38–1–3 (2)	Leoncio Bernabe	PTS	8	Sep 21, 1921	Manila, Philippines	
43	Win	37–1–3 (2)	Syd Keenan	PTS	8	Sep 7, 1921	Manila, Philippines	
42	Win	36–1–3 (2)	Desiderio 'Cowboy' Reyes	PTS	15	Sep 3, 1921	Olympic Stadium, Manila, Philippines	Won vacant Oriental bantamweight title
41	Win	35–1–3 (2)	Mike Ballerino	PTS	20	Aug 23, 1921	Manila, Philippines	
40	Loss	34–1–3 (2)	Eddie Moore	DQ	10 (?)	Aug 9, 1921	Manila, Philippines	
39	Draw	34–0–3 (2)	Mike Ballerino	PTS	15	Jul 25, 1921	Manila, Philippines	
38	Win	34–0–2 (2)	Young Modejar	PTS	6	Jul 11, 1921	Manila, Philippines	
37	Draw	33–0–2 (2)	Leoncio Bernabe	PTS	6	Jun 20, 1921	Manila, Philippines	
36	Win	33–0–1 (2)	Pete Alberto	PTS	8	Jun 6, 1921	Manila, Philippines	
35	Win	32–0–1 (2)	Knockout Lewis	KO	4 (?)	May 22, 1921	Manila, Philippines	
34	Win	31–0–1 (2)	Mike Ballerino	PTS	15	May 8, 1921	Manila, Philippines	
33	Win	30–0–1 (2)	Stiff Irineo	KO	2 (?)	Apr 24, 1921	Manila, Philippines	
32	Win	29–0–1 (2)	Kid Garcia	PTS	8	Apr 10, 1921	Manila, Philippines	
31	Win	28–0–1 (2)	Timoteo Santos	KO	7 (?)	Mar 26, 1921	Olympic Stadium, Manila, Philippines	
30	Win	27–0–1 (2)	Mike Ballerino	PTS	10	Mar 5, 1921	Olympic Stadium, Manila, Philippines	
29	Win	26–0–1 (2)	Terio Pandong	PTS	8	Feb 21, 1921	Manila, Philippines	
28	Win	25–0–1 (2)	Kid Moro	KO	3 (?)	Feb 7, 1921	Manila, Philippines	
27	Win	24–0–1 (2)	Sailor Johnny Candelaria	KO	4 (?)	Jan 23, 1921	Manila, Philippines	
26	Draw	23–0–1 (2)	Mike Ballerino	PTS	15	Jan 10, 1921	Manila, Philippines	
25	Win	23–0 (2)	Stiff Irineo	PTS	6	Jul 10, 1920	Manila, Philippines	Precise date unknown at this time
24	Win	22–0 (2)	Kid Cortez	PTS	6	Jun 10, 1920	Manila, Philippines	Precise date unknown at this time
23	Win	21–0 (2)	Sailor Johnny Candelaria	PTS	6	May 10, 1920	Manila, Philippines	Precise date unknown at this time
22	Win	20–0 (2)	Mike Ballerino	PTS	6	Apr 10, 1920	Manila, Philippines	Precise date unknown at this time
21	ND	19–0 (2)	Mike Ballerino	ND	6	Mar 25, 1920	Manila, Philippines	Precise date unknown at this time
20	Win	19–0 (1)	Mike Ballerino	PTS	6	Mar 10, 1920	Manila, Philippines	Precise date unknown at this time
19	ND	18–0 (1)	Mike Ballerino	ND	6	Feb 25, 1920	Manila, Philippines	Precise date unknown at this time
18	Win	18–0	Jose de la Cruz	PTS	6	Feb 10, 1920	Manila, Philippines	Precise date unknown at this time
17	Win	17–0	Pedro Capitan	KO	4 (?)	Jan 1, 1920	Manila, Philippines	Precise date unknown at this time
16	Win	16–0	Baguio Bearcat	PTS	4	Nov 10, 1919	Manila, Philippines	Precise date unknown at this time
15	Win	15–0	Baguio Bearcat	PTS	4	Oct 10, 1919	Manila, Philippines	Precise date unknown at this time
14	Win	14–0	Pedro Olongapo	PTS	4	Sep 10, 1919	Olympic Stadium, Manila, Philippines	Precise date unknown at this time
13	Win	13–0	Jose de la Cruz	PTS	4	Aug 10, 1919	Manila, Philippines	Precise date unknown at this time
12	Win	12–0	Kid Elino	PTS	4	Jul 10, 1919	Manila, Philippines	Precise date unknown at this time
11	Win	11–0	Young Duarte	PTS	4	Jun 10, 1919	Manila, Philippines	Precise date unknown at this time
10	Win	10–0	Young Edwards	PTS	4	May 10, 1919	Manila, Philippines	Precise date unknown at this time
9	Win	9–0	Jose Mendoza	KO	2 (?)	May 1, 1919	Manila, Philippines	Precise date unknown at this time
8	Win	8–0	Pete Alberto	PTS	4	Apr 10, 1919	Manila, Philippines	Precise date unknown at this time
7	Win	7–0	Kid Moro	KO	2 (?)	Apr 1, 1919	Manila, Philippines	Precise date unknown at this time
6	Win	6–0	Kid Cortez	PTS	4	Mar 10, 1919	Manila, Philippines	Precise date unknown at this time
5	Win	5–0	Jamie Desiderio	KO	2 (?)	Mar 1, 1919	Olympic Stadium, Manila, Philippines	Precise date unknown at this time
4	Win	4–0	Terio Pandong	PTS	4	Feb 10, 1919	Manila, Philippines	Precise date unknown at this time
3	Win	3–0	Cesareo Siguion	KO	2 (?)	Feb 1, 1919	Palomar Pavilion, Manila, Philippines	Precise date unknown at this time
2	Win	2–0	Kid Castro	PTS	5	Jan 10, 1919	Manila, Philippines	Precise date unknown at this time
1	Win	1–0	Alberto Castro	KO	3 (?)	Jan 1, 1919	Manila, Philippines	

== Titles in boxing ==
=== Major world titles ===
- NYSAC flyweight champion (Note: Inaugural champion.) (112 lbs)
- NBA (WBA) flyweight champion (112 lbs)

=== The Ring magazine titles ===
- The Ring flyweight champion (112 lbs)

=== Regional/International titles ===
- American flyweight champion (112 lbs)
- Oriental bantamweight champion (118 lbs)

=== Undisputed titles ===
- Undisputed flyweight champion (Note: First ever undisputed flyweight champion.)

== Boxing Hall of Fame ==
Filipinos in the International Boxing Hall of Fame

Number	Name	Year inducted	Notes
1	Flash Elorde	1993	NBA Super featherweight (130), The Ring Super Featherweight (130), & WBC Super featherweight (130) Champion. the first Filipino boxer who ever inducted on the International Boxing Hall of Fame. Holds the record at super featherweight division for longest title reign, spanning seven years. "Modern inductee"
2	Pancho Villa	1994	NYSAC Flyweight (112), NBA Flyweight (112), The Ring Flyweight (112) Champion. First Filipino/Asian World Champion. "Old-timer inductee"
3	Lope Sarreal	2005	Asia's leading promoter, manager, and international booking agent in the years that followed World War II. Also Known as the "Grand Old Man of Philippine Boxing" produced 22 world champions during his illustrious career."Non-participants"
4	Manny Pacquiao	2025	First and only boxer to win twelve major world titles in eight different weight divisions –Flyweight (112), Super bantamweight (122), Featherweight (126), Super featherweight (130), Lightweight (135), Light welterweight (140), Welterweight (147) & Super welterweight (154), his achievements remain unparallel in the history of boxing. Also became the oldest welterweight champion in 2019 with a win against WBA champ Keith Thurman."Modern inductee"

= Indicates the person is no longer alive

== See also ==
- List of flyweight boxing champions
- List of Filipino Boxing World Champions

== Notes and references ==
=== References ===
Achievements
Preceded by Jimmy Wilde	World Flyweight Champion; June 18, 1923 – July 14, 1925; Died	Vacant Title next held by Fidel LaBarba
Sporting positions
Preceded by Mike Glover	Latest born world champion to die July 14, 1925 – February 1, 1937	Succeeded by Tony Marino
Records
Preceded by Stanley Ketchel; 24	Youngest Dying World Champion; 23; July 14, 1925 – August 12, 1982	Succeeded by Masao Ohba; 23
