= New York Velodrome =

Sports venue in New York City, New York

Coordinates: 40.872841°N 73.907478°W

- Interactive map of New York Velodrome
- Location: New York City, New York
- Capacity: 18,000
- Surface: Dirt track, grass infield

Construction
- Opened: ?
- Demolished: August 4, 1930 (fire)

Tenant
- Cycling (1921-1930)

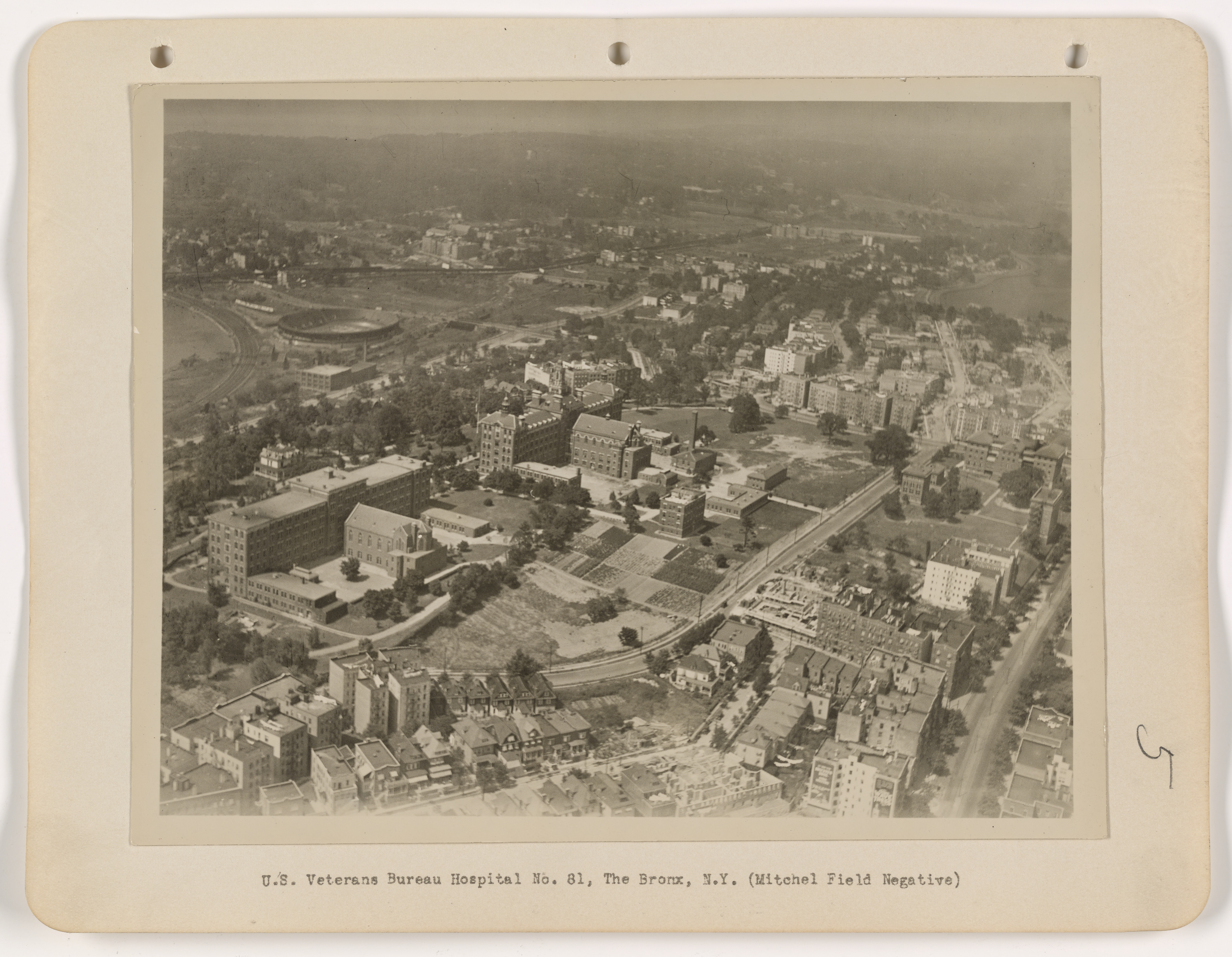
New York Velodrome in the upper left area.

The New York Velodrome was a state-of-the-art bicycle track at 225th Street, between Exterior Street and Broadway within the Kingsbridge and Kingsbridge Heights neighborhoods of the Bronx. It bordered the Marble Hill neighborhood. After the surrounding of Marble Hill was filled in and merged to the Bronx or the mainland, the space filled in became part of Kingsbridge. The velodrome was built on top of the new land that was available. The New York and Putnam Railroad stopped in front of it at the Kingsbridge Station (a building that still stands today). The Velodrome was one of the largest velodromes in the world. It became a popular destination for professional cyclist. The velodrome was destroyed in a fire on August 4, 1930.

Years later, different businesses were built on top of the site. Today, the parking garage and Target store section of the River Plaza (Shopping Mall) is present.

== See also ==
- Coney Island Velodrome
- Newark Velodrome
