= Martin Young =

Martin or Martyn Young may refer to:

- Martin Young (journalist) (1947–2024), British television reporter and interviewer
- Martin Young (cricketer) (1924–1993), English cricketer
- Martin Young (footballer) (born 1955), English footballer
- Martyn Young, musician in Colourbox

== See also ==
- Martin Young House
- Young Martin
