= List of undisputed world boxing champions =

This is a list of undisputed champions in professional boxing. Eras that are not listed do not have undisputed champions.

Current undisputed champion
Most consecutive title defenses

== Championship recognition ==
Titles have been awarded by:

- New York State Athletic Commission (NYSAC), founded in 1920
- World Boxing Association (WBA), founded in 1921 as the National Boxing Association (NBA); renamed to the WBA in 1962
- World Boxing Council (WBC), founded in 1963
- International Boxing Federation (IBF), founded in 1983
- World Boxing Organization (WBO), founded in 1988

== Criteria ==
- 1921–1963, a boxer who held both the NYSAC and NBA (WBA) world titles simultaneously
- 1963–1983, a boxer who held both the WBA and WBC world titles simultaneously
- 1983–2007, a boxer who held the WBA, WBC, and IBF world titles simultaneously
- 2007–present, a boxer who holds the WBA, WBC, IBF and WBO world titles simultaneously

== Heavyweight ==
=== NYSAC–NBA era (1921–1963) ===
No.	Name	Date	Defenses
1	Jack Dempsey (awarded inaugural NBA title while holding the NYSAC title)	Jan 1921 – 23 Sep 1926	3
2	Gene Tunney	23 Sep 1926 – 31 Jul 1928	2
Tunney retires.
3	Max Schmeling (def. Jack Sharkey)	12 Jun 1930 – 6 Jan 1931	0
Schmeling's undisputed status ended when he was stripped of his NYSAC title for refusing to fight Jack Sharkey.
4	Max Schmeling (2) (reinstated by the NYSAC while holding the NBA title)	22 Jan – 21 Jun 1932	0
5	Jack Sharkey	21 Jun 1932 – 29 Jun 1933	0
6	Primo Carnera	29 Jun 1933 – 14 Jun 1934	2
7	Max Baer	14 Jun 1934 – 13 Jun 1935	0
8	James J. Braddock	13 Jun 1935 – 22 Jun 1937	0
9	Joe Louis	22 Jun 1937 – 1 Mar 1949	26
Louis retires.
10	Ezzard Charles (def. Joe Louis)	27 Sep 1950 – 18 Jul 1951	4
11	Jersey Joe Walcott	18 Jul 1951 – 23 Sep 1952	1
12	Rocky Marciano	23 Sep 1952 – 27 Apr 1956	6
Marciano retires.
13	Floyd Patterson (def. Archie Moore)	30 Nov 1956 – 26 Jun 1959	4
14	Ingemar Johansson	26 Jun 1959 – 29 Jun 1960	0
15	Floyd Patterson (2)	20 Jun 1960 – 25 Sep 1962	2
16	Sonny Liston	25 Sep 1962 – 22 Jul 1963	0
Era ends because the WBC is inaugurated. Liston would win the inaugural WBC title on his rematch with Floyd Patterson.

=== WBA–WBC era (1963–1983) ===
No.	Name	Date	Defenses
1	Sonny Liston (def. Floyd Patterson)	22 Jul 1963 – 25 Feb 1964	0
2	Muhammad Ali	25 Feb – 14 Sep 1964	0
Ali's undisputed status ended when he got stripped of his WBA title for agreeing to a rematch against Sonny Liston.
3	Muhammad Ali (2) (def. Ernie Terrell)	6 Feb – 28 Apr 1967	1
Ali got stripped of his titles for refusing to be drafted to military service.
4	Joe Frazier (def. Jimmy Ellis)	16 Feb 1970 – 22 Jan 1973	4
5	George Foreman	22 Jan 1973 – 29 Oct 1974	2
6	Muhammad Ali (3)	29 Oct 1974 – 15 Feb 1978	10
7	Leon Spinks	15 Feb – 19 Mar 1978	0
Spinks' undisputed status ended when he was stripped of the WBC title for pursuing a rematch against Muhammad Ali instead of a bout against mandatory challenger Ken Norton.

=== WBA–WBC–IBF era (1983–2007) ===
No.	Name	Date	Defenses
1	Mike Tyson (def. Tony Tucker)	1 Aug 1987 – 11 Feb 1990	6
2	Buster Douglas	11 Feb – 25 Oct 1990	0
3	Evander Holyfield	25 Oct 1990 – 13 Nov 1992	3
4	Riddick Bowe	13 Nov – 14 Dec 1992	0
Bowe's undisputed status ended when he vacated his WBC title and threw the title into the trash.
5	Lennox Lewis (def. Evander Holyfield)	13 Nov 1999 – 12 Apr 2000	0
Lewis' undisputed status ended when he was stripped of his WBA title for agreeing to fight WBC mandatory Michael Grant instead of WBA mandatory John Ruiz. Ruiz challenged this decision in court on the basis of a clause in the Lewis–Holyfield rematch contract which said Lewis' first bout as undisputed champion would be against the WBA's number one contender. The court then ruled in favor of Ruiz.

=== WBA–WBC–IBF–WBO era (2007–present) ===
No.	Name	Date	Defenses
1	Oleksandr Usyk (def. Tyson Fury)	18 May – 25 Jun 2024	0
Usyk's undisputed status ended when he vacated the IBF title after opting to rematch Tyson Fury rather than facing his mandatory challenger Daniel Dubois.
2	Oleksandr Usyk (2) (def. Daniel Dubois)	19 Jul – 17 Nov 2025	0
Usyk's undisputed status ended when he vacated the WBO title.

== Cruiserweight ==
=== WBA–WBC–IBF era (1983–2007) ===
No.	Name	Date	Defenses
1	Evander Holyfield (def. Carlos De León)	9 Apr – Dec 1988	0
Holyfield's undisputed status ended when he vacated all his titles to move up to heavyweight full time.
2	O'Neil Bell (def. Jean-Marc Mormeck)	7 Jan – 6 Apr 2006	0
Bell's undisputed status ended when he was stripped of the IBF title after undergoing dental surgery and subsequently withdrawing from a fight with mandatory challenger Steve Cunningham scheduled for 6 May.

=== WBA–WBC–IBF–WBO era (2007–present) ===
No.	Name	Date	Defenses
1	Oleksandr Usyk (def. Murat Gassiev)	21 Jul 2018 – 27 Mar 2019	1
Usyk's undisputed status ended when he vacated his WBA title and moved up to heavyweight.

== Light heavyweight ==
=== NYSAC–NBA era (1921–1963) ===
No.	Name	Date	Defenses
1	Georges Carpentier (awarded inaugural NBA title while holding the NYSAC title)	Jan 1921 – 24 Sep 1922	0
2	Battling Siki	24 Sep 1922 – 17 Mar 1923	0
3	Mike McTigue	17 Mar 1923 – 23 May 1925	1
4	Paul Berlenbach	23 May 1925 – 16 Jul 1926	3
5	Jack Delaney	16 Jul 1926 – 26 Jul 1927	1
Delaney vacates his titles to move up to heavyweight.
6	Tommy Loughran (def. Mike McTigue)	7 Oct 1927 – 3 Sep 1929	5
Loughran vacates his titles to move up to heavyweight.
7	Maxie Rosenbloom (def. Jimmy Slattery)	Sep 1930 – 6 Jun 1931	1
Rosenbloom is stripped of the NBA title for failing to defend the title in a timely manner.
8	Maxie Rosenbloom (2) (def. Bob Godwin)	24 Mar 1933 – 17 Sep 1934	2
Rosenbloom is stripped of the NBA title because the NBA disliked his "clowning tactics and criticizing opponents in the ring".
9	Bob Olin (def. Maxie Rosenbloom)	16 Nov 1934 – 31 Oct 1935	0
10	John Henry Lewis	31 Oct 1935 – 28 Jul 1938	3
Lewis' undisputed status ended when he got stripped of his NYSAC title for failing to fight Tiger Jack Fox.
11	Billy Conn (def. Melio Bettina)	13 Jul 1939 – 20 Dec 1940	3
Conn vacated his titles to move up to the heavyweight division.
12	Gus Lesnevich (def. Tami Mauriello)	26 Aug 1941 – 26 Jul 1948	4
13	Freddie Mills	26 Jul 1948 – 24 Jan 1950	0
14	Joey Maxim	24 Jan 1950 – 17 Dec 1952	2
15	Archie Moore	17 Dec 1952 – 25 Oct 1960	8
Moore's undisputed status ended when he was stripped of his NBA title for failing to fight Eric Schoeppner.
16	Harold Johnson (def. Doug Jones)	12 May 1962 – 14 Feb 1963	1
Era ended when the WBC was inaugurated. Johnson was then awarded the inaugural title.

=== WBA–WBC era (1963–1983) ===
No.	Name	Date	Defenses
1	Harold Johnson (awarded inaugural WBC title while holding the WBA title)	14 Feb – 1 Jun 1963	0
2	Willie Pastrano	1 Jun 1963 – 30 Mar 1965	2
3	José Torres	30 Mar 1965 – 16 Dec 1966	3
4	Dick Tiger	16 Dec 1966 – 24 May 1968	2
5	Bob Foster	24 May 1968 – 9 Dec 1970	4
Foster's undisputed status ended when he was stripped of the WBA title for failing to post a $5,000 forfeit bond for the fight with Jimmy Dupree within 10 days after losing to Joe Frazier.
6	Bob Foster (2) (def. Vicente Rondón)	7 Apr 1972 – 16 Sep 1974	6
Foster retires.
7	Michael Spinks (def. Dwight Muhammad Qawi)	18 Mar 1983 – 25 Feb 1984	1
Era ended when IBF was inaugurated. Spinks would then win the inaugural IBF title.

=== WBA–WBC–IBF era (1983–2007) ===
No.	Name	Date	Defenses
1	Michael Spinks (def. Eddie Davis)	25 Feb 1984 – 9 Oct 1985	2
Spinks' undisputed status ended when he was stripped of the WBC light heavyweight title due to the WBC's policy against fighters holding world titles in multiple divisions at the same time.
2	Roy Jones Jr. (def. Reggie Johnson)	5 Jun 1999 – 18 Nov 2002	7
Jones Jr.'s undisputed status ended when he vacated his IBF title.

=== WBA–WBC–IBF–WBO era (2007–present) ===
No.	Name	Date	Defenses
1	Artur Beterbiev (def. Dmitry Bivol)	12 Oct 2024 – 22 Feb 2025	0
2	Dmitry Bivol	22 Feb – 7 Apr 2025	0
Bivol vacated the WBC title to pursue a third fight against Artur Beterbiev instead of fighting WBC interim champion David Benavidez.

== Super middleweight ==
=== WBA–WBC–IBF–WBO era (2007–present) ===
No.	Name	Date	Defenses
1	Canelo Álvarez (def. Caleb Plant)	6 Nov 2021 – 26 Jul 2024	4
Álvarez's undisputed status ended when he was stripped of the IBF title for opting to fight Edgar Berlanga instead of his mandatory challenger William Scull.
2	Canelo Álvarez (2) (def. William Scull)	3 May – 13 Sep 2025	0
3	Terence Crawford	13 Sep – 3 Dec 2025	0
Crawford's undisputed status ended when he was stripped of the WBC title for failing to pay the sanctioning fees. He retired from boxing 13 days later.

== Middleweight ==
=== NYSAC–NBA era (1921–1963) ===
No.	Name	Date	Defenses
1	Johnny Wilson (awarded inaugural NBA title while holding the NYSAC title)	Jan 1921 – 21 Jun 1922	3
Wilson's undisputed status ended when he got stripped of his NYSAC title for refusing to fight Harry Greb.
2	Johnny Wilson (2) (reinstated as NYSAC champion while holding the NBA title)	12 Apr – 31 Aug 1923	0
3	Harry Greb	31 Aug 1923 – 25 Feb 1926	4
4	Tiger Flowers	25 Feb – 3 Dec 1926	1
5	Mickey Walker	3 Dec 1926 – 6 Jan 1931	3
Walker's undisputed status ended when he was stripped of his NYSAC title for not taking steps in making a title defense.
6	Lou Brouillard (awarded NBA title while holding the NYSAC title)	18 Sep – 30 Oct 1933	0
7	Vince Dundee	30 Oct 1933 – 11 Sep 1934	2
8	Teddy Yarosz	11 Sep 1934 – 10 Sep 1935	0
9	Eddie Babe Risko	19 Sep 1935 – 11 Jul 1936	1
10	Freddie Steele	11 Jul 1936 – Jun 1938	5
Steele's undisputed status ended when he was stripped of his NYSAC title for refusing to fight Fred Apostoli.
11	Tony Zale (def. Georgie Abrams)	28 Nov 1941 – 16 Jul 1947	1
Zale was defeated by Rocky Graziano however, Graziano was not recognized by the NYSAC because his license was revoked due to failure of reporting an attempted bribe.
12	Tony Zale (2) (def. Rocky Graziano)	10 Jun – 21 Sep 1948	0
13	Marcel Cerdan	21 Sep 1948 – 16 Jun 1949	0
14	Jake LaMotta	16 Jun 1949 – 14 Feb 1951	2
15	Sugar Ray Robinson	14 Feb – 10 Jul 1951	0
16	Randolph Turpin	10 Jul – 12 Sep 1951	0
17	Sugar Ray Robinson (2)	12 Sep 1951 – 19 Dec 1952	2
Robinson vacated and announced first retirement.
18	Bobo Olson (def. Randy Turpin)	21 Oct 1953 – 9 Dec 1955	3
19	Sugar Ray Robinson (3)	9 Dec 1955 – 2 Jan 1957	1
20	Gene Fullmer	2 Jan – 1 May 1957	0
21	Sugar Ray Robinson (4)	1 May – 23 Sep 1957	0
22	Carmen Basilio	23 Sep 1957 – 25 Mar 1958	0
23	Sugar Ray Robinson (5)	25 Mar 1958 – 4 May 1959	0
Robinson's undisputed status ended when he was stripped of his NBA title for failing to fight Carmen Basilio in a trilogy bout.
24	Dick Tiger (awarded NYSAC title while holding the WBA title)	9 Nov 1962 – 10 Aug 1963	1
Era ends because the WBC is inaugurated. Tiger would then fight for the inaugural WBC title.

=== WBA–WBC era (1963–1983) ===
No.	Name	Date	Defenses
1	Dick Tiger (def. Gene Fullmer)	10 Aug – 7 Dec 1963	0
2	Joey Giardello	7 Dec 1963 – 21 Oct 1965	1
3	Dick Tiger (2)	21 Oct 1965 – 25 Apr 1966	0
4	Emile Griffith	25 Apr 1966 – 4 Mar 1968	2
5	Nino Benvenuti	4 Mar 1968 – 7 Nov 1970	4
6	Carlos Monzón	7 Nov 1970 – 23 Apr 1974	9
Monzón's undisputed status ended when he was stripped of his WBC title for not fighting his mandatory challenger Rodrigo Valdez.
7	Carlos Monzón (2) (def. Rodrigo Valdez)	26 Jun 1976 – 29 Aug 1977	1
Monzón retires.
8	Rodrigo Valdez (def. Bennie Briscoe)	5 Nov 1977 – 22 Apr 1978	0
9	Hugo Corro	22 Apr 1978 – 30 Jun 1979	2
10	Vito Antuofermo	30 Jun 1979 – 16 Mar 1980	1
11	Alan Minter	16 Mar – 27 Sep 1980	1
12	Marvin Hagler	27 Sep 1980 – 27 May 1983	6
Era ends because the IBF is inaugurated. Hagler fought for the inaugural IBF title.

=== WBA–WBC–IBF era (1983–2007) ===
No.	Name	Date	Defenses
1	Marvin Hagler (def. Wilford Scypion)	27 May 1983 – 6 Apr 1987	5
Hagler's undisputed status ended when the WBA stripped him of the title for choosing to fight Sugar Ray Leonard instead of mandatory challenger, Herol Graham.
2	Bernard Hopkins (def. Félix Trinidad)	29 Sep 2001 – 16 Jul 2005	6
3	Jermain Taylor	16 Jul – 11 Oct 2005	0
Taylor's undisputed ended when he vacated the IBF title after refusing to participate in an immediate mandatory defense and instead agreed to a rematch with Bernard Hopkins.

== Light middleweight ==
=== WBA–WBC era (1963–1983) ===
No.	Name	Date	Defenses
1	Denny Moyer (def. Stan Harrington)	19 Feb – 29 Apr 1963	0
2	Ralph Dupas	29 Apr – 7 Sep 1963	1
3	Sandro Mazzinghi	7 Sep 1963 – 18 Jun 1965	3
4	Nino Benvenuti	18 Jun 1965 – 25 Jun 1966	1
5	Kim Ki-soo	25 Jun 1966 – 26 May 1968	2
6	Sandro Mazzinghi (2)	26 May – 28 Oct 1968	1
Mazzinghi's undisputed status ended when he was stripped of his titles by the Italian Boxing Federation after an incorrect call made by the referee. He was stripped first of his WBA title, followed by the WBC title.
7	Freddie Little (def. Stanley Hayward)	17 Mar 1969 – 9 Jul 1970	2
8	Carmelo Bossi	9 Jul 1970 – 31 Oct 1971	1
9	Koichi Wajima	31 Oct 1971 – 4 Jun 1974	6
10	Oscar Albarado	4 Jun 1974 – 21 Jan 1975	1
11	Koichi Wajima (2)	21 Jan 1975 – 6 Mar 1975	0
Wajima's undisputed status ended when he was stripped of his WBC title for refusing to fight Miguel de Oliveira. The title was stripped on WBC's February 1975 ratings posted on 6 March.

=== WBA–WBC–IBF era (1983–2007) ===
No.	Name	Date	Defenses
1	Winky Wright (def. Shane Mosley)	13 Mar – 19 Apr 2004	0
Wright's undisputed status ended when he was stripped of his IBF title for agreeing to a rematch against Shane Mosley instead of fighting his mandatory challenger.

=== WBA–WBC–IBF–WBO era (2007–present) ===
No.	Name	Date	Defenses
1	Jermell Charlo (def. Brian Castaño)	14 May 2022 – 30 Sep 2023	0
Charlo's undisputed status ended when he got stripped of the WBO title for fighting Canelo Álvarez instead of mandatory challenger Tim Tszyu.

== Welterweight ==
=== NYSAC–NBA era (1921–1963) ===
No.	Name	Date	Defenses
1	Jack Britton (awarded inaugural NBA title while holding the NYSAC title)	Jan 1921 – 1 Nov 1922	4
2	Mickey Walker	1 Nov 1922 – 6 Jun 1923	0
Walker's undisputed status ended when he was stripped of his NYSAC title for refusing to fight Dave Shade.
3	Mickey Walker (2) (reinstated as NYSAC champion while holding the NBA title)	Nov 1923 – 20 May 1926	3
4	Pete Latzo	20 May 1926 – 3 Jun 1927	2
5	Joe Dundee	3 Jun 1927 – 22 Mar 1929	2
Dundee's undisputed status ended when he was stripped of his NBA title when he failed to sign for a title bout contender.
6	Jackie Fields (def. Joe Dundee)	25 Jul 1929 – 9 May 1930	0
7	Jack Thompson	9 May – 5 Sep 1930	0
8	Tommy Freeman	5 Sep 1930 – 14 Apr 1931	0
9	Jack Thompson (2)	14 Apr – 23 Oct 1931	0
10	Lou Brouillard	23 Oct 1931 – 28 Jan 1932	0
11	Jackie Fields (2)	28 Jan 1932 – 22 Feb 1933	0
12	Young Corbett III	22 Feb 1933 – 29 May 1933	0
13	Jimmy McLarnin	29 May 1933 – 28 May 1934	0
14	Barney Ross	28 May – 17 Sep 1934	0
15	Jimmy McLarnin (2)	17 Sep 1934 – 28 May 1935	0
16	Barney Ross (2)	28 May 1935 – 31 May 1938	2
17	Henry Armstrong	31 May 1938 – 4 Oct 1940	19
18	Fritzie Zivic	4 Oct 1940 – 29 Jul 1941	1
19	Freddie Cochrane	29 Jul 1941 – 1 Feb 1946	0
20	Marty Servo	1 Feb – 25 Sep 1946	0
Servo retires.
21	Sugar Ray Robinson (def. Tommy Bell)	20 Dec 1946 – 15 Feb 1951	4
Robinson vacated the titles to move up to the middleweight division. Robinson's title is automatically vacated after winning the middleweight title.
22	Kid Gavilán (def. Johnny Bratton)	18 May 1951 – 20 Oct 1954	7
23	Johnny Saxton	20 Oct 1954 – 1 Apr 1955	0
24	Tony DeMarco	1 Apr 1955 – 14 Mar 1956	0
25	Carmen Basilio	10 Jun 1955 – 12 Sep 1956	0
26	Johnny Saxton (2)	14 Mar – 12 Sep 1956	0
27	Carmen Basilio (2)	12 Sep 1956 – 23 Sep 1957	1
Basilio vacated after winning the middleweight title.
28	Virgil Akins (def. Vince Martinez)	6 Jun – 5 Dec 1958	0
29	Don Jordan	5 Dec 1958 – 27 May 1960	2
30	Benny Paret	27 May 1960 – 1 Apr 1961	1
31	Emile Griffith	1 Apr – 30 Sep 1961	1
32	Benny Paret (2)	30 Sep 1961 – 24 Mar 1962	0
33	Emile Griffith (2)	24 Mar 1962 – Feb 1963	2
Era ends because the WBC is inaugurated. Griffith was awarded the inaugural WBC title.

=== WBA–WBC era (1963–1983) ===
No.	Name	Date	Defenses
1	Emile Griffith (awarded inaugural WBC title while holding the WBA title)	Feb – 21 Mar 1963	0
2	Luis Manuel Rodríguez	21 Mar – 8 Jun 1963	0
3	Emile Griffith (3)	8 Jun 1963 – 10 Jun 1966	5
Griffith's undisputed status ended when he was stripped of his WBA title for failing to defend it within the required 6 months.
4	Curtis Cokes (def. Jean Josselin)	28 Nov 1966 – 18 Apr 1969	4
5	José Nápoles	18 Apr 1969 – 3 Dec 1970	3
6	Billy Backus	3 Dec 1970 – 4 Jun 1971	0
7	José Nápoles (2)	4 Jun 1971 – 16 May 1975	9
Nápoles' undisputed status ended when he was stripped of his WBA title for failing to sign a fight against the WBA's No. 1-rated welterweight contender, Ángel Espada.
8	Sugar Ray Leonard (def. Thomas Hearns)	16 Sep 1981 – 9 Nov 1982	1
Leonard vacated his titles after being diagnosed with a detached retina and announced his retirement.

=== WBA–WBC–IBF era (1983–2007) ===
No.	Name	Date	Defenses
1	Donald Curry (def. Milton McCrory)	6 Dec 1985 – 27 Sep 1986	0
2	Lloyd Honeyghan	27 Sep 1986 – 5 Jan 1987	0
Honeyghan's undisputed status ended when he vacated the WBA title after the WBA mandated that he defend the title against Harold Volbrecht. Honeyghan dropped the WBA title belt into a trash can on a London street to protest the WBA's continued sanctioning of bouts involving citizens of apartheid-governed South Africa.
3	Cory Spinks (def. Ricardo Mayorga)	13 Dec 2003 – 5 Feb 2005	2
4	Zab Judah	5 Feb 2005 – 7 Jan 2006	1
Judah lost against Carlos Baldomir however, the WBA and IBF titles were not on the line because Baldomir didn't pay the sanctioning fees. This fragmented the titles and ended the undisputed reign.

=== WBA–WBC–IBF–WBO era (2007–present) ===
No.	Name	Date	Defenses
1	Terence Crawford (def. Errol Spence Jr.)	29 Jul – 9 Nov 2023	0
Crawford's reign ended when he was stripped of the IBF title for choosing to rematch Errol Spence Jr. instead of fighting his mandatory challenger Jaron Ennis.

== Light welterweight ==
=== NYSAC–NBA era (1921–1963) ===
No.	Name	Date	Defenses
1	Carlos Ortiz (def. Kenny Lane)	12 Jun 1959 – 1 Sep 1960	2
2	Duilio Loi	1 Sep 1960 – 14 Sep 1962	2
3	Eddie Perkins	14 Sep – 15 Dec 1962	0
4	Duilio Loi (2)	15 Dec 1962 – 24 Jan 1963	0
Loi vacated and retired from boxing.

=== WBA–WBC era (1963–1983) ===
No.	Name	Date	Defenses
1	Eddie Perkins (2) (def. Roberto Cruz)	15 Jun 1963 – 18 Jan 1965	2
2	Carlos Hernández	18 Jan 1965 – 29 Apr 1966	2
3	Sandro Lopopolo	29 Apr 1966 – 30 Apr 1967	1
4	Takeshi Fuji	30 Apr 1967 – 14 Nov 1968	1
Fuji's undisputed status ended when he was stripped of the WBC title for not fighting his mandatory challenger.

=== WBA–WBC–IBF era (1983–2007) ===
No.	Name	Date	Defenses
1	Kostya Tszyu (def. Zab Judah)	3 Nov 2001 – 9 Oct 2003	2
Tszyu's undisputed status ended when he was stripped of the WBC title and is designated as Champion Emeritus.

=== WBA–WBC–IBF–WBO era (2007–present) ===
No.	Name	Date	Defenses
1	Terence Crawford (def. Julius Indongo)	19 Aug – 30 Aug 2017	0
Crawford's undisputed status ended when he vacated the IBF title after refusing to negotiate terms with mandatory challenger Sergey Lipinets, citing an inability to make the fight under the IBF's time frame. He later vacated all of his remaining titles to move up to welterweight.
2	Josh Taylor (def. José Ramírez)	22 May 2021 – 14 May 2022	1
Taylor's undisputed status ended when he was stripped of the WBA title after he failed to sign the contract in an ordered bout against his mandatory challenger, Alberto Puello.

== Lightweight ==
=== NYSAC–NBA era (1921–1963) ===
No.	Name	Date	Defenses
1	Benny Leonard (awarded inaugural NBA title while holding the NYSAC title)	Jan 1921 – 15 Jan 1925	3
Leonard retired.
2	Jimmy Goodrich (def. Stanislaus Loayza)	13 Jul – 7 Dec 1925	0
3	Rocky Kansas	7 Dec 1925 – 3 Jul 1926	0
4	Sammy Mandell	3 Jul 1926 – 17 Jul 1930	3
5	Al Singer	17 Jul – 14 Nov 1930	0
6	Tony Canzoneri	14 Nov 1930 – 23 Jun 1933	5
7	Barney Ross	23 Jun 1933 – 15 Apr 1935	1
Ross vacated to move up to light welterweight.
8	Tony Canzoneri (2) (def. Lou Ambers)	10 May 1935 – 3 Sep 1936	1
8	Lou Ambers	3 Sep 1936 – 17 Aug 1938	2
9	Henry Armstrong	17 Aug 1938 – 22 Aug 1939	1
10	Lou Ambers (2)	22 Aug 1939 – 25 Mar 1940	0
Ambers' undisputed status ended when he was stripped of his NBA title after failing to defend the title within 6 months and refusing to fight the top contender Davey Day.
11	Sammy Angott (def. Lew Jenkins)	19 Dec 1941 – 14 Nov 1942	1
Angott announced his temporary retirement.
12	Ike Williams (def. Bob Montgomery)	4 Aug 1947 – 25 May 1951	5
13	Jimmy Carter	25 May 1951 – 14 May 1952	2
14	Lauro Salas	14 May – 15 Oct 1952	0
15	Jimmy Carter (2)	15 Oct 1952 – 5 Mar 1954	3
16	Paddy DeMarco	5 Mar – 17 Nov 1954	0
17	Jimmy Carter (3)	17 Nov 1954 – 29 Jun 1955	0
18	Wallace Bud Smith	29 Jun 1955 – 24 Aug 1956	1
19	Joe Brown	24 Aug 1956 – 21 Apr 1962	11
20	Carlos Ortiz	21 Apr 1962 – 7 Apr 1963	1
Era ends because the WBC is inaugurated. Ortiz would then win the inaugural WBC title.

=== WBA–WBC era (1963–1983) ===
No.	Name	Date	Defenses
1	Carlos Ortiz (def. Douglas Vaillant)	7 Apr 1963 – 10 Apr 1965	3
2	Ismael Laguna	10 Apr – 13 Nov 1965	0
3	Carlos Ortiz (2)	13 Nov 1965 – 25 Oct 1966	2
Ortiz was stripped of the WBC title after the WBC accused the referee for his title defense against Sugar Ramos of doing a long count.
4	Carlos Ortiz (3) (def. Sugar Ramos)	1 Jul 1967 – 29 Jun 1968	1
5	Carlos Cruz	29 Jun 1968 – 18 Feb 1969	1
6	Mando Ramos	18 Feb 1969 – 3 Mar 1970	1
7	Ismael Laguna (2)	3 Mar – 16 Sep 1970	1
Laguna's undisputed status ended when he was stripped of the WBC title.
8	Ken Buchanan (def. Rubén Navarro)	12 Feb – 25 Jun 1971	0
Buchanan's undisputed status ended when he was stripped of the WBC title for failing to defend it against Pedro Carrasco.
9	Roberto Durán (def. Esteban de Jesús)	21 Jan 1978 – 2 Feb 1979	0
Durán's undisputed status ended when he vacated the WBA title to move up to welterweight.

=== WBA–WBC–IBF era (1983–2007) ===
No.	Name	Date	Defenses
1	Pernell Whitaker (def. Juan Nazario)	11 Aug 1990 – 28 Feb 1992	3
Whitaker's undisputed status ended when he vacated his IBF title to move up to light welterweight. The IBF title was vacated on IBF's February 1992 ratings posted on 28 February.

=== WBA–WBC–IBF–WBO era (2007–present) ===
No.	Name	Date	Defenses
1	Devin Haney (def. George Kambosos Jr)	5 Jun 2022 – 1 Aug 2023	2
Haney's undisputed status ended when the WBC declared him as champion in recess after opting to challenge for the WBC light welterweight title.

== Super featherweight ==
=== NYSAC–NBA era (1921–1963) ===
No.	Name	Date	Defenses
1	Tod Morgan (awarded inaugural NBA title while holding the NYSAC title)	16 Dec 1927 – 19 Dec 1929	5
2	Benny Bass	19 Dec – 31 Dec 1929	0
Bass' undisputed status ended when the NYSAC abolished the division.

=== WBA–WBC era (1963–1983) ===
No.	Name	Date	Defenses
1	Gabriel Elorde (def. Johnny Bizzaro)	16 Feb 1963 – 15 Jun 1967	5
2	Yoshiaki Numata	15 Jun – 14 Dec 1967	0
3	Hiroshi Kobayashi	14 Dec 1967 – 20 Jan 1969	2
Kobayashi's undisputed status ended when he was stripped of the WBC title for refusing to fight René Barrientos.

== Featherweight ==
=== NYSAC–NBA era (1922–1963) ===
No.	Name	Date	Defenses
1	Tony Canzoneri	10 Feb – 28 Sep 1928	0
2	André Routis	28 Sep 1928 – 23 Sep 1929	1
3	Christopher Battalino	23 Sep 1929 – 27 Jan 1932	5
Battalino's undisputed status ended after being stripped of his titles for missing weight in a title fight against Freddie Miller which ended in a controversial no contest.
4	Henry Armstrong (def. Petey Sarron)	29 Oct 1937 – 12 Sep 1938	0
Armstrong vacated his titles stay at the higher weight divisions.
5	Joey Archibald (def. Leo Rodak)	29 Oct 1939 – 29 Mar 1940	1
Archibald's undisputed status ended when he was stripped of the NBA title for not fighting Petey Scalzo.
6	Willie Pep (def. Sal Bartolo)	7 Jun 1946 – 29 Oct 1948	2
7	Sandy Saddler	29 Oct 1948 – 11 Feb 1949	0
8	Willie Pep (2)	11 Feb 1949 – 8 Sep 1950	3
9	Sandy Saddler (2)	8 Sep 1950 – 16 Jan 1957	2
Saddler's undisputed status ended when he was stripped of the NBA title for failing to sign for a title defense.
10	Hogan Bassey (def. Cherif Hamia)	24 Jun 1957 – 18 Mar 1959	1
11	Davey Moore	18 Mar 1959 – 21 Mar 1963	5
Era ends because the WBC is inaugurated. Moore fought and lost to Sugar Ramos for the inaugural WBC title.

=== WBA–WBC era (1963–1983) ===
No.	Name	Date	Defenses
1	Sugar Ramos (def. Davey Moore)	21 Mar 1963 – 26 Sep 1964	3
2	Vicente Saldívar	26 Sep 1964 – 14 Oct 1967	7
Saldívar retires.

== Super bantamweight ==
=== WBA–WBC–IBF–WBO era (2007–present) ===
No.	Name	Date	Defenses
1	Naoya Inoue (def. Marlon Tapales)	26 Dec 2023 – present	7

== Bantamweight ==
=== NYSAC–NBA era (1921–1963) ===
No.	Name	Date	Defenses
1	Joe Lynch (awarded inaugural NBA title while holding the NYSAC title)	Jan – 25 Jul 1921	0
2	Pete Herman	25 Jul – 23 Sep 1921	0
3	Johnny Buff	23 Sep 1921 – 10 Jul 1922	1
4	Joe Lynch (2)	10 Jul 1922 – 19 Oct 1923	2
Lynch's undisputed status ended when he was stripped of his NYSAC title for failing to fight Joe Burman due to a dislocated shoulder.
5	Abe Goldstein (def. Joe Lynch)	21 Mar – 19 Dec 1924	3
6	Eddie Martin	19 Dec 1924 – 20 Mar 1925	0
7	Charley Phil Rosenberg	20 Mar 1925 – 18 Oct 1926	0
Rosenberg's undisputed status ended when he was stripped by the NBA during its annual convention after failing to sign a fight with Bud Taylor.
8	Bushy Graham (def. Isadore Schwartz)	23 May 1928 – Jan 1929	0
Graham's undisputed status ended when he vacated his NYSAC title in January of 1929.
9	Panama Al Brown (def. Gregorio Vidal)	7 Oct 1929 – 3 Feb 1930	0
Brown's undisputed status ended when he got stripped of his NBA title after a special meeting was held.
10	Panama Al Brown (2) (def. Eugène Huat)	4 Oct 1930 – 28 Mar 1934	7
Brown's undisputed status ended when he got stripped of his NYSAC title after he was suspended for not fighting Baby Casanova.
11	Lou Salica (def. Sixto Escobar)	26 Aug – 15 Nov 1935	0
12	Sixto Escobar	15 Nov 1935 – 23 Sep 1937	3
13	Harry Jeffra	23 Sep 1937 – 20 Feb 1938	0
14	Sixto Escobar (2)	20 Feb 1938 – 26 Oct 1939	1
Escobar vacated his titles to move up to featherweight.
15	Lou Salica (2) (def. Georgie Pace)	24 Sep 1940 – 7 Aug 1942	4
Salica lost to Ortiz but the NYSAC title was not on the line because it was only scheduled for 12 rounds. He was later stripped of his NYSAC title for not defending it.
16	Manuel Ortiz (def. Lou Salica)	10 Mar 1943 – 6 Jan 1947	12
17	Harold Dade	6 Jan – 11 Mar 1947	0
18	Manuel Ortiz (2)	11 Mar 1947 – 31 May 1950	4
19	Vic Toweel	31 May 1950 – 15 Nov 1952	3
20	Jimmy Carruthers	15 Nov 1952 – 16 May 1954	3
Carruthers vacated and retired from boxing.
21	Robert Cohen (def. Chamroen Songkitrat)	19 Sep 1954 – 23 Dec 1954	1
Cohen's undisputed status ended when he was stripped of his NBA title for failing to sign a fight against Raúl Macías within 90 days.
22	Alphonse Halimi (def. Raúl Macías)	6 Nov 1957 – 8 Jul 1959	0
23	José Becerra	8 Jul 1959 – 30 Aug 1960	2
Becerra retired due to an eye injury.
24	Éder Jofre (def. John Caldwell)	18 Jan 1962 – 4 Apr 1963	2
Era ends because the WBC is inaugurated. Jofre won the inaugural WBC title.

=== WBA–WBC era (1963–1983) ===
No.	Name	Date	Defenses
1	Éder Jofre (def. Katsutoshi Aoki)	4 Apr 1963 – 18 May 1965	2
2	Fighting Harada	18 May 1965 – 27 Feb 1968	4
3	Lionel Rose	27 Feb 1968 – 22 Aug 1969	3
4	Rubén Olivares	22 Aug 1969 – 16 Oct 1970	2
5	Chucho Castillo	16 Oct 1970 – 2 Apr 1971	0
6	Rubén Olivares (2)	2 Apr 1971 – 19 Mar 1972	2
7	Rafael Herrera	19 Mar – 29 Jul 1972	0
8	Enrique Pinder	29 Jul 1972 – 5 Jan 1973	0
Pinder's undisputed status ended when he was stripped of the WBC title for failing to defend against the number one contender within six months of winning it.

=== WBA–WBC–IBF–WBO era (2007–present) ===
No.	Name	Date	Defenses
1	Naoya Inoue (def. Paul Butler)	13 Dec 2022 – 13 Jan 2023	0
Inoue vacated his titles to move up to super bantamweight.

== Super flyweight ==
To date, there has never been an undisputed champion in this division.

== Flyweight ==
=== NYSAC–NBA era (1921–1963) ===
No.	Name	Date	Defenses
1	Pancho Villa (def. Jimmy Wilde)	18 Jun 1923 – 14 Jul 1925	3
Title vacated because Villa died from Ludwig's angina resulting from an infection that spread to his throat.
2	Fidel LaBarba (def. Frankie Genaro)	22 Aug 1925 – 29 Aug 1927	2
LaBarba retires.
3	Benny Lynch (def. Small Montana)	19 Jan 1937 – 29 Jun 1938	1
Lynch was stripped of his titles when he failed to make weight for a title defense against Jackie Jurich.
4	Jackie Paterson (awarded NBA title while holding the NYSAC title)	14 Oct 1943 – 30 Jul 1947	1
Paterson was stripped of the NBA title for failing to defend against Dado Marino.
5	Rinty Monaghan (def. Dado Marino)	20 Oct 1947 – 30 Mar 1950	3
Monaghan retired after his third defense.
6	Dado Marino (def. Terry Allen)	1 Aug 1950 – 19 May 1952	1
7	Yoshio Shirai	19 May 1952 – 26 Nov 1954	4
8	Pascual Perez	26 Nov 1954 – 16 Apr 1960	9
9	Pone Kingpetch	16 Apr 1960 – 10 Oct 1962	3
10	Fighting Harada	10 Oct 1962 – 12 Jan 1963	0
11	Pone Kingpetch (2)	12 Jan – 14 Feb 1963	0
Era ends because the WBC is inaugurated. Kingpetch would then be rewarded of the inaugural WBC title.

=== WBA–WBC era (1963–1983) ===
No.	Name	Date	Defenses
1	Pone Kingpetch (awarded inaugural WBC title while holding the WBA title)	14 Feb – 18 Sep 1963	0
2	Hiroyuki Ebihara	18 Sep 1963 – 23 Jan 1964	0
3	Pone Kingpetch (3)	23 Jan 1964 – 23 Apr 1965	0
4	Salvatore Burruni	23 Apr – 1 Nov 1965	0
Burruni's undisputed ended when he was stripped of his WBA title for failing to meet the organization's number one contender, Hiroyuki Ebihara.
5	Horacio Accavallo (def. Katsuyoshi Takayama)	1 Mar 1966 – 2 Oct 1968	1
Retired.

== Light flyweight ==
To date, there has never been an undisputed champion in this division.

== Mini flyweight ==
To date, there has never been an undisputed champion in this division.

== List of champions in multiple weight classes ==
Below is a list of boxers that have held the undisputed championship in at least two different weight classes. As of February 2026, Henry Armstrong and Terence Crawford are the only boxers to have held the claim in three weight classes.

Name	Weight class	Date
Mickey Walker	Welterweight	1 Nov 1922
Mickey Walker	Middleweight	3 Dec 1926
Tony Canzoneri	Featherweight	10 Feb 1928
Tony Canzoneri	Lightweight	14 Nov 1930
Lou Brouillard	Welterweight	23 Oct 1931
Lou Brouillard	Middleweight	18 Sep 1933
Barney Ross	Lightweight	23 Jun 1933
Barney Ross	Welterweight	28 May 1934
Henry Armstrong	Featherweight	29 Oct 1937
Henry Armstrong	Welterweight	31 May 1938
Henry Armstrong	Lightweight	17 Aug 1938
Sugar Ray Robinson	Welterweight	20 Dec 1946
Sugar Ray Robinson	Middleweight	14 Feb 1951
Carmen Basilio	Welterweight	10 Jun 1955
Carmen Basilio	Middleweight	23 Sep 1957
Carlos Ortiz	Light welterweight	12 Jun 1959
Carlos Ortiz	Lightweight	21 Apr 1962
Fighting Harada	Flyweight	10 Oct 1962
Fighting Harada	Bantamweight	18 May 1965
Emile Griffith	Welterweight	1 Apr 1961
Emile Griffith	Middleweight	25 Apr 1966
Dick Tiger	Middleweight	10 Aug 1963
Dick Tiger	Light heavyweight	16 Dec 1966
Nino Benvenuti	Light middleweight	18 Jun 1965
Nino Benvenuti	Middleweight	17 Apr 1967
Evander Holyfield	Cruiserweight	9 Apr 1988
Evander Holyfield	Heavyweight	25 Oct 1990
Terence Crawford	Light welterweight	19 Aug 2017
Terence Crawford	Welterweight	29 Jul 2023
Terence Crawford	Super middleweight	13 Sep 2025
Naoya Inoue	Bantamweight	13 Dec 2022
Naoya Inoue	Super bantamweight	26 Dec 2023
Oleksandr Usyk	Cruiserweight	21 July 2018
Oleksandr Usyk	Heavyweight	18 May 2024

== See also ==
- List of current world boxing champions
- List of WBA world champions
- List of WBC world champions
- List of IBF world champions
- List of WBO world champions
- List of The Ring world champions
- List of NYSAC world champions
- Undisputed championship (boxing)
