= Pascual Pérez =

Pascual Pérez is the name of:

- Pascual Pérez (baseball) (1957–2012), Dominican baseball player
- Pascual Pérez (boxer) (1926–1977), Argentine flyweight boxer (known also as Pascualito)
