= Rinty Monaghan =

Irish boxer

Personal information
- Nickname: Rinty
- Nationality: Irish; British
- Born: John Joseph Monaghan; 21 August 1918 Belfast, Ireland
- Died: 3 March 1984 (aged 65) Belfast, Northern Ireland
- Height: 5 ft 3 in (1.60 m)
- Weight: Flyweight

Boxing career
- Reach: 64 in (163 cm)
- Stance: Orthodox

Boxing record
- Total fights: 69
- Wins: 52
- Win by KO: 19
- Losses: 9
- Draws: 8

John Joseph Monaghan (21 August 1918 – 3 March 1984) was a Northern Irish boxer who reigned as the undisputed flyweight champion of the world from 1947 until his retirement in 1949. He became famous in the post-war period, eventually rising to become world champion and a hero to many people in his home city of Belfast.

== Boxing career ==
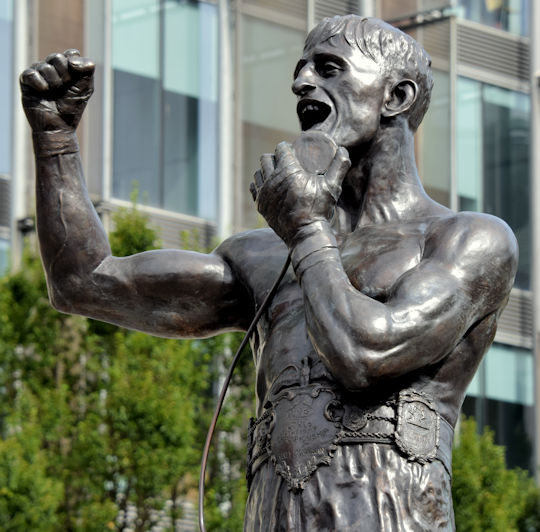
Statue of Monaghan in York Street, close to Belfast city centre

Monaghan was born at 23 Lancaster Street in North Belfast, the eldest boy of three and four sisters. His parents were Thomas, a seaman, and Martha (née Wilson). He attended St Patrick's Christian Brothers' School in Donegall St. A noted fighter at boys' level, he entered the paid ranks in his mid-teens. After a short absence for wartime service, Monaghan resumed his career and his burgeoning reputation drew huge crowds from all parts of his home city. In particular, bouts at Belfast's King's Hall were the highlight with that venue normally packed to the rafters.

In October 1947, the National Boxing Association world crown became his after outpointing the American, Dado Marino, at Harringay Stadium for the vacant title. The mantle of undisputed champion of the world rested on his shoulders after his defeat of the tough Scottish fighter Jackie Paterson by knock-out in the King's Hall on Saturday 23 March 1948. In all Monaghan fought Paterson three times, losing in 1938 but winning in 1946 and 1948.

In April 1949 he retained his World title, and became European champion, by dispatching Frenchman Maurice Sandeyron.

Monaghan's final fight came in September 1949 when he drew with Londoner Terry Allen. By the time that a long-standing chest complaint forced his retirement as champion in 1950, Monaghan's trophy-cabinet contained the British, European, Commonwealth and World crowns. Of the 66 official bouts he fought during his successful career, he lost only nine and drew six. Monaghan endeared himself to his supporters after his fights by singing When Irish Eyes are Smiling to the King's Hall audience, which joined in the singing.

== Life outside boxing ==
A part-time cabaret artist, Monaghan toured western Europe during World War II with other notables of the period, including Vera Lynn, Gracie Fields and George Formby, and later formed his own band.

His nickname "Rinty" came from his fondness for dogs. According to his daughter Martha, he brought home injured dogs so often that his grandmother called him Rin Tin Tin, after the film dog, and shortened it to Rinty.

Monaghan married Frances Thompson in 1938 and moved to the nearby district of "Little Italy", close to Sailortown. He had three daughters, Martha, Rosetta and Collette, and one son, Sean. The money Monaghan had made from boxing did not set him up for a comfortable retirement, and he had to work in a variety of jobs. But he remained true to his working-class roots and stayed in Belfast. Monaghan died at his home in Little Corporation St on 3 March 1984, at the relatively young age of 65. He is buried in Belfast City Cemetery.

To mark the influence of this "home-town hero", the Ulster History Circle and Belfast City Council provided a plaque in his honour at the King's Hall. It was unveiled, in the presence of many of his family circle and friends, on 3 May 2007.

Belfast City Council erected a statue to Monaghan at Cathedral Gardens on 20 August 2015. Designed by Alan Beattie Herriot, this 10-foot high bronze statue on a granite plinth features Monaghan holding a microphone and singing "When Irish Eyes are Smiling".

== Professional boxing record ==
69 fights	52 wins	9 losses
By knockout	20	1
By decision	31	7
By disqualification	1	1
Draws	8	

No.	Result	Record	Opponent	Type	Round	Date	Age	Location	Notes
69	Draw	52–9–8	Terry Allen	PTS	15	Sep 30, 1949	31 years, 40 days	Kings Hall, Belfast, Northern Ireland, UK	Retained NBA, Lonsdale, European, and The Ring flyweight titles
68	Win	52–9–7	Otello Belardinelli	PTS	10	Aug 19, 1949	30 years, 363 days	Hippodrome, Belfast, Northern Ireland, UK	
67	Win	51–9–7	Maurice Sandeyron	PTS	15	Apr 5, 1949	30 years, 227 days	Kings Hall, Belfast, Northern Ireland, UK	Retained NBA, Lonsdale, and The Ring flyweight titles; Won European flyweight title
66	Loss	50–9–7	Terry Allen	PTS	8	Feb 7, 1949	30 years, 170 days	Villa Park, Birmingham, West Midlands, England, UK	
65	Win	50–8–7	Charlie Squire	TKO	7 (10)	Jun 28, 1948	29 years, 312 days	Villa Park, Birmingham, West Midlands, England, UK	
64	Win	49–8–7	Jackie Paterson	KO	7 (15)	Mar 23, 1948	29 years, 215 days	Kings Hall, Belfast, Northern Ireland, UK	Retained NBA flyweight title; Won Lonsdale and The Ring flyweight titles
63	Win	48–8–7	Dado Marino	PTS	15	Oct 20, 1947	29 years, 60 days	Harringay Arena, England, UK	Won vacant NBA flyweight title
62	Loss	47–8–7	Dado Marino	DQ	9 (10)	Jul 16, 1947	28 years, 329 days	Hampden Park, Glasgow, Scotland, UK	Monaghan DQ'd for persistent holding
61	Win	47–7–7	Emile Famechon	PTS	8	Jul 1, 1947	28 years, 314 days	Olympia, London, England, UK	
60	Win	46–7–7	Terry Allen	TKO	1 (10)	Mar 11, 1947	28 years, 202 days	Seymour Hall, London, England, UK	
59	Win	45–7–7	Sammy Reynolds	DQ	8 (10)	Sep 24, 1946	28 years, 34 days	Kings Hall, Belfast, Northern Ireland, UK	Reynolds DQ'd for low blow
58	Win	44–7–7	Alex Murphy	PTS	8	Sep 11, 1946	28 years, 21 days	Kelvin Hall, Glasgow, Scotland, UK	
57	Win	43–7–7	Jackie Paterson	RTD	7 (10)	Jun 7, 1946	27 years, 290 days	Kings Hall, Belfast, Northern Ireland, UK	
56	Win	42–7–7	Tommy Burney	PTS	8	Apr 4, 1946	27 years, 226 days	The Stadium, Liverpool, Merseyside, England, UK	
55	Win	41–7–7	Bunty Doran	KO	4 (15)	Nov 6, 1945	27 years, 77 days	Kings Hall, Belfast, Northern Ireland, UK	Won BBBofC Northern Ireland Area flyweight title
54	Loss	40–7–7	Joe Curran	PTS	10	Oct 18, 1945	27 years, 58 days	The Stadium, Liverpool, Merseyside, England, UK	
53	Win	40–6–7	Tommy Burney	PTS	10	Sep 13, 1945	27 years, 23 days	The Stadium, Liverpool, Merseyside, England, UK	
52	Win	39–6–7	Joe 'Boy' Collins	PTS	10	Feb 9, 1945	26 years, 172 days	Theatre Royal, Dublin, Ireland	
51	Win	38–6–7	Joe Meikle	KO	2 (8)	Oct 14, 1943	25 years, 54 days	Ulster Hall, Belfast, Northern Ireland, UK	
50	Loss	37–6–7	Ike Weir	PTS	10	Jul 13, 1943	24 years, 326 days	Ulster Hall, Belfast, Northern Ireland, UK	
49	Draw	37–5–7	Harry Rogers	PTS	8	Feb 6, 1943	24 years, 169 days	Ulster Hall, Belfast, Northern Ireland, UK	
48	Win	37–5–6	Joe Meikle	PTS	8	Dec 26, 1942	24 years, 127 days	Rialto, Belfast, Northern Ireland, UK	
47	Loss	36–5–6	Jimmy Gill	PTS	10	Mar 20, 1940	21 years, 212 days	New St James Hall, Newcastle, Tyne and Wear, England, UK	
46	Win	36–4–6	Tommy Stewart	PTS	8	Mar 4, 1940	21 years, 196 days	Ulster Hall, Belfast, Northern Ireland, UK	
45	Loss	35–4–6	Paddy Ryan	PTS	10	Jan 10, 1940	21 years, 142 days	New St James Hall, Newcastle, Tyne and Wear, England, UK	
44	Win	35–3–6	Seaman Chetty	PTS	10	Nov 8, 1939	21 years, 79 days	New St James Hall, Newcastle, Tyne and Wear, England, UK	
43	Win	34–3–6	Billy Ashton	PTS	8	Jul 20, 1939	20 years, 333 days	The Stadium, Liverpool, Merseyside, England, UK	
42	Win	33–3–6	Tommy Stewart	PTS	8	Jun 28, 1939	20 years, 311 days	Kings Hall, Belfast, Northern Ireland, UK	
41	Win	32–3–6	Sammy Reynolds	PTS	10	Mar 20, 1939	20 years, 211 days	New St James Hall, Newcastle, Tyne and Wear, England, UK	
40	Win	31–3–6	Joe Curran	KO	5 (10)	Feb 27, 1939	20 years, 190 days	New St James Hall, Newcastle, Tyne and Wear, England, UK	
39	Loss	30–3–6	Tommy Stewart	PTS	10	Sep 2, 1938	20 years, 12 days	Belfast Sports Stadium, Belfast, Northern Ireland, UK	
38	Win	30–2–6	Joe Curran	PTS	8	Aug 11, 1938	19 years, 355 days	The Stadium, Liverpool, Merseyside, England, UK	
37	Loss	29–2–6	Jackie Paterson	KO	5 (8)	Jul 23, 1938	19 years, 336 days	The Oval (Glentoran FC), Belfast, Northern Ireland, UK	
36	Win	29–1–6	Joe Kiely	KO	2 (10)	Jul 2, 1938	19 years, 315 days	The Oval (Glentoran FC), Belfast, Northern Ireland, UK	
35	Win	28–1–6	Ivor Neil	KO	2 (8)	Jun 18, 1938	19 years, 301 days	The Oval (Glentoran FC), Belfast, Northern Ireland, UK	
34	Win	27–1–6	Peter Peters	KO	1 (10)	May 27, 1938	19 years, 279 days	Belfast Sports Stadium, Belfast, Northern Ireland, UK	
33	Win	26–1–6	Battling Joe McCluskey	PTS	10	May 6, 1938	19 years, 258 days	Belfast Sports Stadium, Belfast, Northern Ireland, UK	
32	Win	25–1–6	Cyclone Kelly	PTS	10	Apr 15, 1938	19 years, 237 days	Belfast Sports Stadium, Belfast, Northern Ireland, UK	
31	Win	24–1–6	Cyclone Kelly	PTS	10	Mar 31, 1938	19 years, 222 days	The Stadium, Liverpool, Merseyside, England, UK	
30	Win	23–1–6	Spider Allen	KO	2 (10)	Mar 1, 1938	19 years, 192 days	Cuba Street Sports Stadium, Belfast, Northern Ireland, UK	
29	Win	22–1–6	Pat Murphy	TKO	4 (10)	Feb 4, 1938	19 years, 167 days	Belfast Sports Stadium, Belfast, Northern Ireland, UK	
28	Win	21–1–6	Alf Hughes	KO	9 (10)	Jan 21, 1938	19 years, 153 days	Belfast Sports Stadium, Belfast, Northern Ireland, UK	
27	Win	20–1–6	Tommy Allen	KO	5 (8)	Dec 2, 1937	19 years, 103 days	Kings Hall, Belfast, Northern Ireland, UK	
26	Win	19–1–6	George Lang	KO	1 (10)	Nov 17, 1937	19 years, 88 days	Chapel Fields Arena, Belfast, Northern Ireland, UK	
25	Win	18–1–6	Paddy O'Toole	TKO	4 (8)	Oct 1, 1937	19 years, 41 days	Belfast Sports Stadium, Belfast, Northern Ireland, UK	
24	Win	17–1–6	Ted Meikle	PTS	8	Sep 17, 1937	19 years, 27 days	Belfast Sports Stadium, Belfast, Northern Ireland, UK	
23	Win	16–1–6	Frank Benson	TKO	6 (6)	Aug 18, 1937	18 years, 362 days	Chapel Fields Arena, Belfast, Northern Ireland, UK	
22	Win	15–1–6	Ted Meikle	TKO	4 (6)	Aug 9, 1937	18 years, 353 days	Chapel Fields Arena, Belfast, Northern Ireland, UK	
21	Win	14–1–6	Ted Meikle	PTS	6	Jul 13, 1937	18 years, 326 days	Chapel Fields Arena, Belfast, Northern Ireland, UK	
20	Win	13–1–6	Sam Ramsey	PTS	6	Jul 7, 1937	18 years, 320 days	Chapel Fields Arena, Belfast, Northern Ireland, UK	
19	Win	12–1–6	Mick Gibbons	PTS	6	Jun 21, 1937	18 years, 304 days	Chapel Fields Arena, Belfast, Northern Ireland, UK	
18	Win	11–1–6	Mick Gibbons	PTS	6	May 10, 1937	18 years, 262 days	Chapel Fields Arena, Belfast, Northern Ireland, UK	
17	Loss	10–1–6	Jim Keery	PTS	6	May 1, 1937	18 years, 253 days	Belfast, Northern Ireland, UK	
16	Win	10–0–6	Joe Duffy	PTS	6	Sep 18, 1936	18 years, 28 days	Factory Arena, Larne, Northern Ireland, UK	
15	Draw	9–0–6	Young Josephs	PTS	6	Jul 24, 1936	17 years, 338 days	Market Yard, Larne, Northern Ireland, UK	
14	Draw	9–0–5	Jack McKenzie	PTS	8	May 20, 1936	17 years, 273 days	Chapel Fields Arena, Belfast, Northern Ireland, UK	
13	Win	9–0–4	Young Josephs	TKO	3 (6)	May 16, 1936	17 years, 269 days	Chapel Fields Arena, Belfast, Northern Ireland, UK	
12	Win	8–0–4	Young Kelly	PTS	6	Apr 8, 1936	17 years, 231 days	Chapel Fields Arena, Belfast, Northern Ireland, UK	
11	Win	7–0–4	Sam Ramsey	PTS	6	Mar 28, 1936	17 years, 220 days	Chapel Fields Arena, Belfast, Northern Ireland, UK	
10	Draw	6–0–4	Sam Ramsey	PTS	6	Mar 20, 1936	17 years, 212 days	Carrickfergus, Northern Ireland, UK	
9	Win	6–0–3	Young Josephs	PTS	6	Feb 22, 1936	17 years, 185 days	Belfast, Northern Ireland, UK	
8	Win	5–0–3	Sam Ramsey	PTS	6	Jan 13, 1936	17 years, 145 days	Chapel Fields Arena, Belfast, Northern Ireland, UK	
7	Win	4–0–3	Young Finnegan	PTS	6	Mar 29, 1935	16 years, 220 days	The Ring, Belfast, Northern Ireland, UK	
6	Win	3–0–3	Vic Large	KO	4 (4)	Feb 17, 1935	16 years, 180 days	The Ring, Belfast, Northern Ireland, UK	
5	Win	2–0–3	Jim Pedlow	PTS	4	Dec 19, 1934	16 years, 120 days	The Ring, Belfast, Northern Ireland, UK	
4	Draw	1–0–3	Boy Ramsey	PTS	4	Dec 5, 1934	16 years, 106 days	The Ring, Belfast, Northern Ireland, UK	
3	Draw	1–0–2	Boy Ramsey	PTS	4	Sep 28, 1934	16 years, 38 days	The Ring, Belfast, Northern Ireland, UK	
2	Win	1–0–1	Jim Norney	PTS	4	Apr 27, 1932	13 years, 250 days	Belfast, Northern Ireland, UK	
1	Draw	0–0–1	Sam Ramsey	PTS	4	Apr 13, 1932	13 years, 236 days	Belfast, Northern Ireland, UK	

== Titles in boxing ==
=== Major world titles ===
- NBA (WBA) flyweight champion (112 lbs)

=== The Ring magazine titles ===
- The Ring flyweight champion (112 lbs)

=== Regional/International titles ===
- Lonsdale Belt flyweight champion (112 lbs)
- Northern Ireland flyweight champion (112 lbs)
- European flyweight champion (112 lbs)

=== Undisputed titles ===
- Undisputed flyweight champion (Note: The NYSAC stopped awarding their flyweight title during this period, as such, Rinty was recognized as the undisputed flyweight world champion.)

== See also ==
- List of flyweight boxing champions
- List of British flyweight boxing champions

== Notes and references ==
=== References ===
Achievements
Preceded by Jackie Paterson	World Flyweight Champion; 1948-03-23 – 1949-09-30	Succeeded by Terry Allen
