= Dai Dower =

Wales boxer

Personal information
- Nationality: Welsh
- Born: David William Dower; 20 June 1933 Abercynon, Wales
- Died: 1 August 2016 (aged 83)
- Weight: Flyweight

Boxing career
- Stance: Orthodox

Boxing record
- Total fights: 37
- Wins: 34
- Win by KO: 12
- Losses: 3
- Draws: 0
- No contests: 0

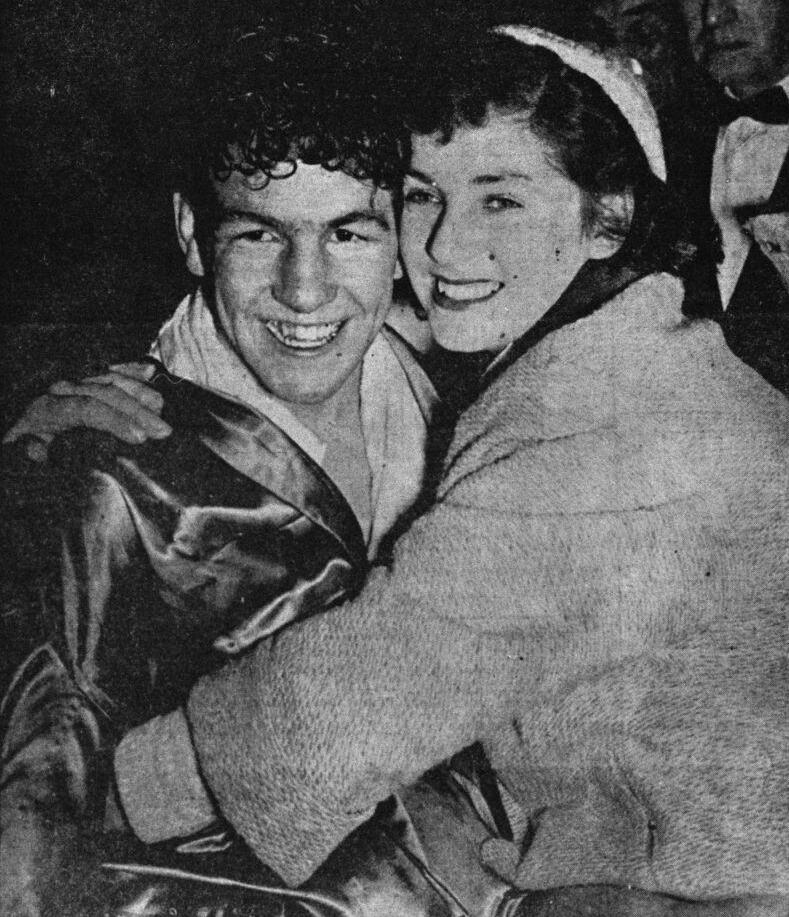
Picture of Dai Dower, and his fiancé, Evelyn Trapp, on the front page of Y Cymro, 10 February 1955

David William "Dai" Dower MBE (20 June 1933 – 1 August 2016), was a Welsh professional boxer who was a British, Empire and European Flyweight boxing champion, and is considered by fans and critics alike as one of the most successful Welsh boxers of all time.

== Amateur career ==
After becoming the 1952 Amateur Boxing Association British flyweight champion, when boxing out of the Roath Youth ABC Dower was selected for the team of Great Britain at the 1952 Summer Olympics in the boxing squad, recording victories over Abdelamid Boutefnouchet of France (3–0) and Leslie Donovan Perera Handunge of Ceylon (3–0) before finally losing to Soviet boxer Anatoli Bulakov, the holder of the Russian and European titles, 1–2.

== Professional career ==
While continuing to work as a coal miner at Abercynon colliery, in 1953 Dower turned professional and he made his professional debut at Maindy Arena in Cardiff against Vernon John. Dower won by technical knockout. Dower then beat Ron Hughes in two rounds before he was taken the distance for the first time, opposing the vastly more experienced Preston fighter Colin Clitheroe. Clitheroe had lost three of twenty two fights, mostly at bantamweight, but lost to Dower by points in a six-round bout. With another four wins to his name, including two over Jimmy Roche, Dower faced Clitheroe again, this time stopping him in round five.

On 23 March 1954, with 14 straight professional wins, Dower faced current British Flyweight Champion Terry Allen in a non-title fight at 8st 2lbs. Scheduled for a ten-round fight at Earls Court Arena in London, Dower stopped Allen in the second.

With 20 successful bouts as a professional boxer under his belt Dower was given his first chance at a title fight. On 19 October 1954 he became British Empire Champion, taking the title away from South African Zulu boxer Jake Tuli. In November 1954, Dower was ranked 3 in the world by The Ring magazine. Dower was selected as the 'Best Young Boxer' of 1954 by the Boxing Writers' Club in February 1955.

Dower married Evelyn Trapp on 6 January 1955.

A second chance of a title came in 1955 in the shape of the British flyweight crown. Terry Allen, a previous Dower victim, had vacated the title allowing Dai Dower to contest the crown against Eric Marsden on 8 March at the Harringay Arena. Also at stake was Dower's Empire crown. Dower beat Marsden by points over the 15 round contest.

Still unbeaten after 23 fights, the next title came just five months later when Dower took on Nazzareno Gianelli for the European Flyweight title at Earls Court Exhibition Centre, London. The fight went the distance, with Dower winning on points to add the European title.

His first defeat came in his defence of the European title, his 27th fight. Young Martin, a Spaniard, began to get through to the champion with his forceful and hurtful body attacks. Dower was dropped in the ninth round for the first time in his career. Dower hit the canvas six times in the tenth. It ended in the twelfth round when Martin dropped Dower for the full count.

In December 1955, he made a successful defence of his Empire title against Tuli. Five wins out of five followed in 1956. Later in the year Dower's plans were interrupted when he was called up to the army to do his two years National Service, having expected to continue working at the colliery. He joined the Welch Regiment in October 1956, relinquishing his titles at the same time. In December 1956 he was ranked 2nd in the world (behind Pascual Perez) by The Ring.

On 30 March 1957 Dower fought World Flyweight Champion Perez at Club Atletico San Lorenzo de Almagro, in Perez's home town of Buenos Aires. Dower suffered a first-round defeat despite going into the fight with a weight advantage of more than five pounds.

Dai Dower continued his National Service in the British Army. He beat Eric Brett in January 1958, and a few days before his army time ended, was due to face Terry Spinks, although the fight was cancelled.

Dower only had one more fight, a points defeat against Canadian Pat Supple in October 1958.

== Later life and death ==
Shortly before his final fight he took up the position of sports master at Ringwood Grammar School in Bournemouth. He became head of sport at Bournemouth University, a position he held for twenty one years, and in June 1998 he became the recipient of an MBE, awarded for his years of teaching sport to children. Dower lived in retirement in Bournemouth. Dower died on 1 August 2016 at the age of 83.

== See also ==
- Boxing at the 1952 Summer Olympics
- List of British flyweight boxing champions
