= Dado Marino =

American boxer

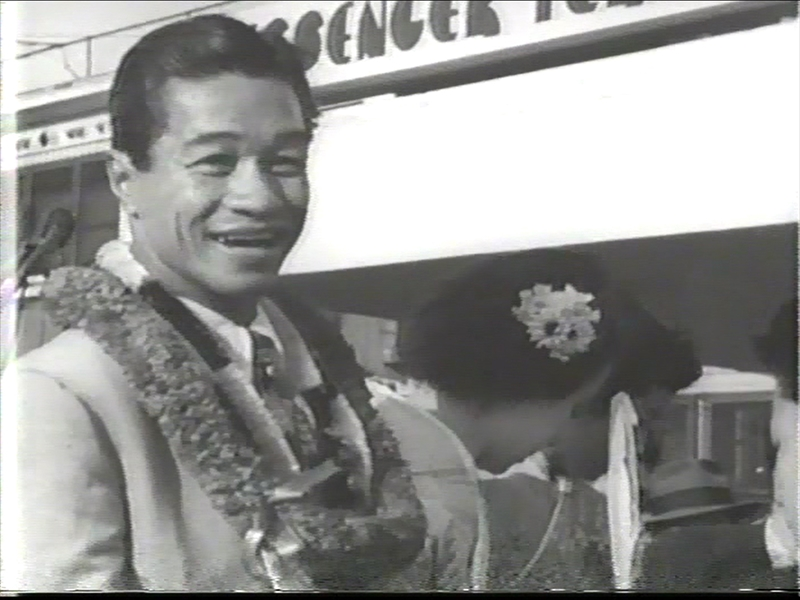
- Marino in 1952

Personal information
- Nationality: American (after 1959); Hawaiian (before 1959)
- Born: Salvador Marino; October 15, 1915 Honolulu, Territory of Hawaii
- Died: October 28, 1989 (aged 74) United States
- Weight: Flyweight; Bantamweight

Boxing career
- Stance: Orthodox

Boxing record
- Total fights: 74
- Wins: 57
- Win by KO: 21
- Losses: 14
- Draws: 3

Salvador "Dado" Marino (1915–1989) was a flyweight boxer from Honolulu, Hawaii, who became Undisputed World flyweight champion in 1950. He also boxed as a bantamweight, and unsuccessfully fought for the World bantamweight title.

== Professional career ==
He made his professional debut in June 1941, in Honolulu, where he was to fight the majority of his bouts. He defeated Paul Francis by a knockout in the second round.

He fought his first forty bouts in Honolulu, before travelling to Glasgow, in Scotland in July 1947, for a title fight against Jackie Paterson, the World flyweight champion. Unfortunately, Paterson was unable to make the weight, and indeed collapsed at the weigh-in. The result was that Paterson was stripped of his World title, and a non-title fight was arranged between Marino and Rinty Monaghan of Northern Ireland. Marino won the bout when Monaghan was disqualified in the ninth round.

A month later Marino fought Peter Kane, the previous holder of the World flyweight title, before Paterson. The fight was held in Manchester and Kane won on points over ten rounds.

In October 1947, Marino and Rinty Monaghan met at Harringay Arena, London for the vacant World flyweight title, previously held by Jackie Paterson. The title fight was recognised by the National Boxing Association but not the British Boxing Board of Control. Monaghan won on points over fifteen rounds to take the title.

Dado then returned to the US, and continued his career.

In March 1949, the legendary World bantamweight champion, American Manuel Ortiz, came to Honolulu to defend his title against Marino. Marino again lost out when Ortiz won a unanimous points decision.

== World title ==
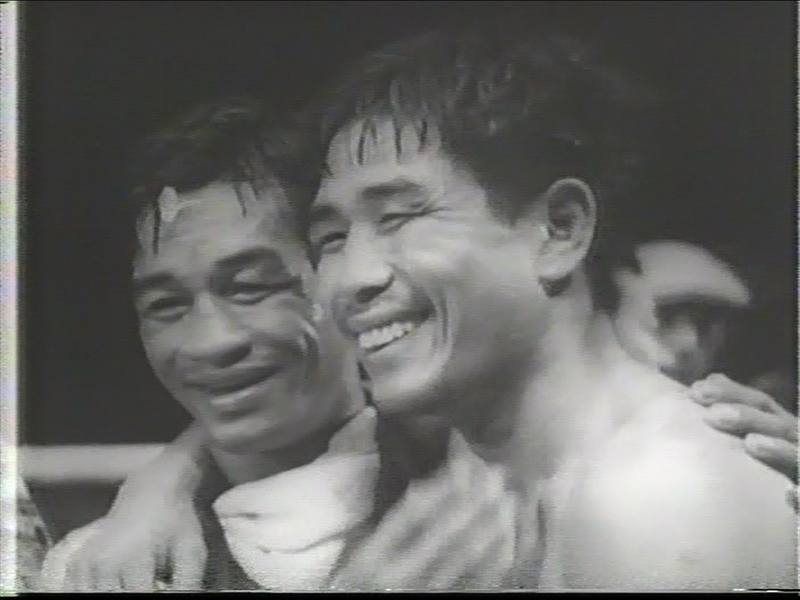
Dado Marino and Shirai (on the left) after their third fight in May 1952.

In August 1950, Terry Allen, the English holder of the World flyweight title, came to Honolulu to defend his title against Marino. Marino became World champion when he won a unanimous points decision.

In November 1951, Allen returned for a re-match in Honolulu, but Marino retained the title with another unanimous decision.

In his next fight, a non-title fight, Marino was stopped in seven rounds, in Honolulu, by Yoshio Shirai, of Japan. Marino was down six times before his manager leapt through the ropes to halt the fight.

Despite this defeat, Marino agreed to defend his title against Shirai in May 1952. The title fight was in Tokyo, Japan, in front of 40,00 spectators. Shirai took Marino's title with a unanimous points decision.

In November 1952, Marino tried to regain the title in a re-match with Shiriai, again in Tokyo, but the Japanese won another unanimous decision. This was Marino's last fight.

== Professional boxing record ==
75 fights	57 wins	15 losses
By knockout	21	3
By decision	35	12
By disqualification	1	0
Draws	3	

No.	Result	Record	Opponent	Type	Round(s), time	Date	Age	Location	Notes
75	Loss	57–15–3	Yoshio Shirai	UD	15	Nov 15, 1952	37 years, 31 days	Korakuen Baseball Stadium, Tokyo, Japan	For NBA and The Ring flyweight titles
74	Loss	57–14–3	Yoshio Shirai	UD	15	May 19, 1952	36 years, 217 days	Korakuen Baseball Stadium, Tokyo, Japan	Lost NBA and The Ring flyweight titles
73	Loss	57–13–3	Yoshio Shirai	TKO	7 (10), 1:11	Dec 4, 1951	36 years, 50 days	Honolulu Stadium, Honolulu, Hawaii	
72	Win	57–12–3	Terry Allen	UD	15	Nov 1, 1951	36 years, 17 days	Honolulu Stadium, Honolulu, Hawaii	Retained NBA and The Ring flyweight titles
71	Draw	56–12–3	Fernando Gagnon	MD	10	Aug 27, 1951	35 years, 316 days	Colisee de Quebec, Quebec City, Quebec, Canada	
70	Win	56–12–2	Hideo Goto	UD	10	Jul 30, 1951	35 years, 288 days	Tokyo, Japan	
69	Win	55–12–2	Hiroshi Horiguchi	TKO	8 (10)	Jun 25, 1951	35 years, 253 days	Tokyo, Japan	Fought in heavy rain
68	Draw	54–12–2	Hideo Goto	PTS	10	Jun 9, 1951	35 years, 237 days	Nishinomiya, Hyogo, Japan	
67	Win	54–12–1	Yoshio Shirai	SD	10	May 21, 1951	35 years, 218 days	Korakuen Baseball Stadium, Tokyo, Japan	
66	Loss	53–12–1	Eduardo Reyes	UD	6	Apr 30, 1951	35 years, 197 days	Civic Auditorium, Honolulu, Hawaii	
65	Win	53–11–1	Tanny Campo	PTS	10	Jan 31, 1951	35 years, 108 days	Rizal Memorial Sports Complex, Manila, Metro Manila, Philippines	
64	Win	52–11–1	Bobby Garza	KO	7 (10), 2:00	Oct 31, 1950	35 years, 16 days	Civic Auditorium, Honolulu, Hawaii	
63	Win	51–11–1	Alfredo Chavez	UD	10	Oct 4, 1950	34 years, 354 days	Paseo de Susana, Agana, Guam	
62	Win	50–11–1	Tim Ramos	KO	4 (10), 2:01	Sep 18, 1950	34 years, 339 days	Agana, Guam	
61	Win	49–11–1	Terry Allen	UD	15	Aug 1, 1950	34 years, 290 days	Honolulu Stadium, Honolulu, Hawaii	Won NBA and The Ring flyweight titles
60	Loss	48–11–1	Tirso Del Rosario	SD	10	Dec 22, 1949	34 years, 68 days	Rizal Memorial Sports Complex, Manila, Metro Manila, Philippines	
59	Loss	48–10–1	Tirso Del Rosario	TKO	5 (10)	Sep 16, 1949	33 years, 336 days	Rizal Memorial Sports Complex, Manila, Metro Manila, Philippines	For Oriental featherweight title
58	Win	48–9–1	Lou Langley	PTS	5	Sep 6, 1949	33 years, 326 days	Civic Auditorium, Honolulu, Hawaii	
57	Win	47–9–1	Stan Almond	UD	10	Aug 18, 1949	33 years, 307 days	Forum, Vancouver, British Columbia, Canada	
56	Win	46–9–1	Jackie Turner	UD	10	Aug 4, 1949	33 years, 293 days	Forum, Vancouver, British Columbia, Canada	
55	Win	45–9–1	Jorge Sanchez	KO	3 (6), 1:21	Jul 26, 1949	33 years, 284 days	Civic Auditorium, Honolulu, Hawaii	
54	Loss	44–9–1	Manuel Ortiz	UD	15	Mar 1, 1949	33 years, 137 days	Honolulu Stadium, Honolulu, Hawaii	For NYSAC, NBA, and The Ring bantamweight titles
53	Win	44–8–1	Chico Rosa	UD	10	Sep 21, 1948	32 years, 342 days	Civic Auditorium, Honolulu, Hawaii	
52	Win	43–8–1	Gus Rosa	UD	10	Jul 16, 1948	32 years, 275 days	Armory, Hilo, Hawaii	
51	Win	42–8–1	Jackie Turner	UD	10	Jun 22, 1948	32 years, 251 days	Honolulu Stadium, Honolulu, Hawaii	
50	Win	41–8–1	Marino Tiwanak	KO	5 (10), 1:46	Jun 1, 1948	32 years, 230 days	Civic Auditorium, Honolulu, Hawaii	
49	Loss	40–8–1	Cecil Schoonmaker	UD	10	May 24, 1948	32 years, 222 days	Coliseum Bowl, San Francisco, California, U.S.	
48	Win	40–7–1	Kenny Lindsay	KO	1 (10), 0:42	May 10, 1948	32 years, 208 days	Coliseum Bowl, San Francisco, California, U.S.	
47	Win	39–7–1	Tommy Rhett	KO	1 (10), 0:57	Apr 26, 1948	32 years, 194 days	Stockton, California, U.S.	
46	Win	38–7–1	Sonny Gomez	UD	10	Apr 13, 1948	32 years, 181 days	Memorial Auditorium, Sacramento, California, U.S.	
45	Win	37–7–1	Mike Bernal	SD	10	Apr 6, 1948	32 years, 174 days	Civic Auditorium, Stockton, California, U.S.	
44	Loss	36–7–1	Rinty Monaghan	PTS	15	Oct 20, 1947	32 years, 5 days	King's Hall, Belle Vue, Manchester, Lancashire, England, U.K.	For vacant NBA flyweight title
43	Loss	36–6–1	Peter Kane	PTS	10	Aug 8, 1947	31 years, 297 days	King's Hall, Belle Vue, Manchester, Lancashire, England, U.K.	
42	Win	36–5–1	Rinty Monaghan	DQ	9 (10)	Jul 16, 1947	31 years, 274 days	Hampden Park, Glasgow, Scotland, U.K.	Monaghan DQ'd for excessive holding
41	Win	35–5–1	Gus Rosa	UD	10	Feb 25, 1947	31 years, 133 days	Civic Auditorium, Honolulu, Hawaii	
40	Win	34–5–1	Eduardo Reyes	PTS	8	Dec 9, 1946	31 years, 55 days	Civic Auditorium, Honolulu, Hawaii	
39	Win	33–5–1	Eduardo Reyes	PTS	6	Nov 11, 1946	31 years, 27 days	Honolulu Stadium, Honolulu, Hawaii	
38	Win	32–5–1	Val Valentine	MD	8	Sep 30, 1946	30 years, 350 days	Civic Auditorium, Honolulu, Hawaii	
37	Win	31–5–1	Ankie Hoshijo	PTS	6	Jul 5, 1946	30 years, 263 days	Civic Auditorium, Honolulu, Hawaii	
36	Win	30–5–1	Alfredo Chavez	UD	10	May 5, 1946	30 years, 202 days	Honolulu Stadium, Honolulu, Hawaii	Retained USA Hawaii State flyweight title
35	Loss	29–5–1	Alfredo Chavez	PTS	6	Mar 9, 1946	30 years, 145 days	Civic Auditorium, Honolulu, Hawaii	
34	Win	29–4–1	Jose Onacanim	KO	3 (6), 1:40	Jan 12, 1946	30 years, 89 days	Civic Auditorium, Honolulu, Hawaii	
33	Win	28–4–1	Gus Rosa	UD	6	Dec 29, 1945	30 years, 75 days	Civic Auditorium, Honolulu, Hawaii	
32	Win	27–4–1	Gus Rosa	PTS	8	Apr 28, 1945	29 years, 195 days	Civic Auditorium, Honolulu, Hawaii	
31	Win	26–4–1	Lou Renai	PTS	6	Apr 8, 1945	29 years, 175 days	Civic Auditorium, Honolulu, Hawaii	
30	Draw	25–4–1	Gus Rosa	PTS	6	Mar 17, 1945	29 years, 153 days	Civic Auditorium, Honolulu, Hawaii	
29	Loss	25–4	David Kui Kong Young	PTS	8	Feb 6, 1945	29 years, 114 days	Nimitz Bowl, Honolulu, Hawaii	
28	Win	25–3	Eddie Silva	KO	4 (6), 0:40	Dec 9, 1944	29 years, 55 days	Civic Auditorium, Honolulu, Hawaii	
27	Win	24–3	Eddie Silva	KO	4 (8), 2:03	Nov 19, 1944	29 years, 35 days	Civic Auditorium, Honolulu, Hawaii	
26	Win	23–3	Joho Shiroma	MD	8	Jun 18, 1944	28 years, 247 days	Civic Auditorium, Honolulu, Hawaii	
25	Win	22–3	Chico Rosa	UD	10	May 13, 1944	28 years, 211 days	Civic Auditorium, Honolulu, Hawaii	
24	Win	21–3	Alfredo Chavez	PTS	12	Apr 29, 1944	28 years, 197 days	Civic Auditorium, Honolulu, Hawaii	Retained USA Hawaii flyweight title
23	Win	20–3	Alfredo Chavez	MD	10	Apr 9, 1944	28 years, 177 days	Civic Auditorium, Honolulu, Hawaii	
22	Win	19–3	Quentin Hernandez	RTD	1 (10), 3:00	Mar 12, 1944	28 years, 149 days	Civic Auditorium, Honolulu, Hawaii	
21	Loss	18–3	Richard Silva	PTS	8	Dec 5, 1943	28 years, 51 days	Civic Auditorium, Honolulu, Hawaii	
20	Win	18–2	Alfredo Chavez	PTS	8	Nov 21, 1943	28 years, 37 days	Civic Auditorium, Honolulu, Hawaii	
19	Win	17–2	Adolph Samuels	PTS	10	Aug 22, 1943	27 years, 311 days	Civic Auditorium, Honolulu, Hawaii	
18	Loss	16–2	David Kui Kong Young	KO	8 (12), 1:13	May 2, 1943	27 years, 199 days	Honolulu Stadium, Honolulu, Hawaii	For TBC world bantamweight title
17	Win	16–1	Adolph Samuels	UD	8	Feb 7, 1943	27 years, 115 days	Civic Auditorium, Honolulu, Hawaii	
16	Loss	15–1	Quentin Hernandez	PTS	8	Jan 24, 1943	27 years, 101 days	Civic Auditorium, Honolulu, Hawaii	
15	Win	15–0	Adolph Samuels	PTS	10	Sep 27, 1942	26 years, 347 days	Civic Auditorium, Honolulu, Hawaii	
14	Win	14–0	Willie Gonzalez	KO	8 (10), 1:44	Sep 6, 1942	26 years, 326 days	Civic Auditorium, Honolulu, Hawaii	
13	Win	13–0	Joe Sanchez	TKO	5 (6)	Aug 9, 1942	26 years, 298 days	Civic Auditorium, Honolulu, Hawaii	
12	Win	12–0	Charley Higa	PTS	6	Jan 11, 1942	26 years, 88 days	Civic Auditorium, Honolulu, Hawaii	
11	Win	11–0	Toy Tamanaha	PTS	6	Nov 14, 1941	26 years, 30 days	Civic Auditorium, Honolulu, Hawaii	
10	Win	10–0	Toy Tamanaha	PTS	6	Nov 3, 1941	26 years, 19 days	Honolulu Stadium, Honolulu, Hawaii	
9	Win	9–0	Jimmy Clinton	KO	5 (6), 0:56	Oct 16, 1941	26 years, 1 day	Civic Auditorium, Honolulu, Hawaii	
8	Win	8–0	Little Reynes	RTD	2 (6), 3:00	Oct 6, 1941	25 years, 356 days	Honolulu Stadium, Honolulu, Hawaii	
7	Win	7–0	Frankie Baron	KO	7 (8), 2:12	Sep 5, 1941	25 years, 325 days	Civic Auditorium, Honolulu, Hawaii	
6	Win	6–0	Kid Rustia	TKO	1 (6), 2:15	Aug 22, 1941	25 years, 311 days	Civic Auditorium, Honolulu, Hawaii	
5	Win	5–0	Sergio Delania	KO	1 (6)	Aug 15, 1941	25 years, 304 days	Isenberg Gymnasium, Lihue, Hawaii	
4	Win	4–0	Charley Higa	PTS	6	Aug 11, 1941	25 years, 300 days	Civic Auditorium, Honolulu, Hawaii	
3	Win	3–0	Al Rufino	KO	2 (4), 0:58	Jul 18, 1941	25 years, 276 days	Civic Auditorium, Honolulu, Hawaii	
2	Win	2–0	Hilo Francisco	KO	1 (4), 1:55	Jul 3, 1941	25 years, 261 days	Civic Auditorium, Honolulu, Hawaii	
1	Win	1–0	Paul Francis	KO	2 (4), 2:35	Jun 20, 1941	25 years, 248 days	Civic Auditorium, Honolulu, Hawaii	

== Titles in boxing ==
=== Major world titles ===
- NBA (WBA) flyweight champion (112 lbs)

=== The Ring magazine titles ===
- The Ring flyweight champion (112 lbs)

=== Regional/International titles ===
- Hawaii flyweight champion (112 lbs)

=== Undisputed titles ===
- Undisputed flyweight champion (Note: The NYSAC stopped awarding their flyweight title during this period, as such, Dado was recognized as the undisputed flyweight world champion.)

== See also ==
- List of flyweight boxing champions

== Notes and references ==
=== References ===
Achievements
Preceded by Terry Allen	World flyweight champion August 1, 1950 - May 19, 1952	Succeeded by Yoshio Shirai
