= Yoshio Shirai =

Japanese boxer

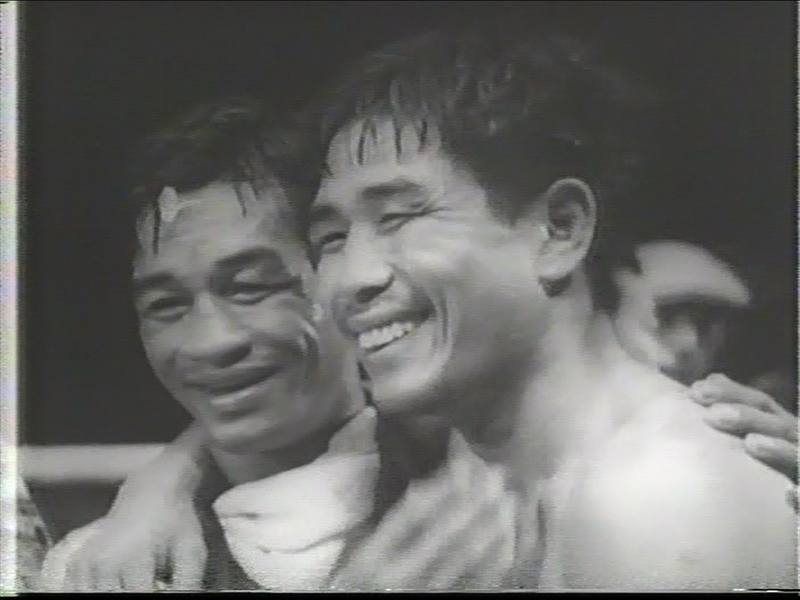
- Dado Marino (on the left) and Shirai after their third fight in May 1952

Personal information
- Nationality: Japanese
- Born: Yoshio Shirai; November 23, 1923 Tokyo, Japan
- Died: December 26, 2003 (aged 80)
- Weight: Flyweight

Boxing career
- Stance: Orthodox

Boxing record
- Total fights: 58
- Wins: 46
- Win by KO: 18
- Losses: 8
- Draws: 4

Yoshio Shirai (白井 義男, Shirai Yoshio; November 23, 1923 – December 26, 2003) was a professional boxer from Tokyo, Japan. He won the Undisputed Flyweight Championship in 1952, becoming the first Japanese boxer to win a world title.

== Childhood and early career ==
Shirai first boxed in elementary school, during a mock match-up against a kangaroo at a local carnival. He became interested in boxing afterwards, and made his professional debut in 1943, during World War II. He won his first eight professional fights before being drafted to join the Imperial Japanese Navy. After being released in 1945, he returned to boxing, but was almost forced into retirement because of injuries he had sustained during the war. However, he met Alvin Rober Cahn, a Jewish-American SCAP employee, who became his trainer and manager. Shirai's boxing skills improved dramatically under Cahn's guidance, and the two formed a close bond.

Shirai fought with the aggressive boxing style typical of the Japanese boxers of the time, but made a change to a more technical, defensive style under the guidance of his new trainer. Cahn made Shirai live in his house, and supervised everything from his health and training to his meals. Cahn began to suffer from dementia in his old age, and it was Shirai's family that took care of him. Cahn had no children when he died, and left Shirai with his entire fortune.

== Professional career ==
Shirai won his first fight after teaming with Cahn on July 30, 1948, and won the Japanese flyweight title in 1949. He also won the Japanese bantamweight title the same year, and held both titles for over 3 years, making 5 total defenses.

He fought flyweight world champion Dado Marino on May 21, 1951, in a non-title match. Shirai lost by split decision but fought Marino again in December, 1951, to mark a 7th-round KO win. On May 19, 1952, he met Marino for the third time for the world flyweight title. Shirai won by 15-round decision, becoming the new world champion, and first ever Japanese boxer to win a world title.

Shirai made four defenses of the world title before losing his title to Pascual Perez in November, 1954 by unanimous decision. He fought Perez again in May, 1955, but lost decisively by KO in the 5th round. He announced his retirement after this loss. His professional record was 48-8-2 (20KOs).

== Personal life ==
Shirai was a distant relative of socialist politician Inejirō Asanuma, who served as the wedding matchmaker (nakōdo) at Shirai's marriage.

== Post-retirement ==
Shirai worked as a boxing commentator and critic before creating a sports gym in 1995 with former world champion Yoko Gushiken. He received an award from the Japanese government in 1995 for his efforts in boxing. He was inducted into the Ring Magazine hall of fame in 1977.

== Death ==
Shirai died from pneumonia on December 26, 2003. He was 80 years old.

== Professional boxing record ==
58 fights	46 wins	8 losses
By knockout	18	3
By decision	27	4
By disqualification	1	1
Draws	4	

No.	Result	Record	Opponent	Type	Round, time	Date	Location	Notes
58	Loss	46–8–4	Pascual Pérez	KO	5 (15), 2:59	May 30, 1955	Korakuen Baseball Stadium, Japan	For NBA and The Ring flyweight titles
57	Loss	46–7–4	Pascual Pérez	UD	15	Nov 26, 1954	Korakuen Baseball Stadium, Japan	Lost NBA and The Ring flyweight titles
56	Win	46–6–4	Takashi Seno	KO	4 (8)	Sep 18, 1954	Japan	
55	Win	45–6–4	Alberto Barenghi	PTS	10	Aug 11, 1954	Estadio Luna Park, Buenos Aires, Argentina	
54	Draw	44–6–4	Pascual Pérez	PTS	10	Jul 24, 1954	Estadio Luna Park, Buenos Aires, Argentina	
53	Win	44–6–3	Leo Espinosa	SD	15	May 24, 1954	Korakuen Baseball Stadium, Japan	Retained NBA and The Ring flyweight titles
52	Win	43–6–3	Masaru Kaneko	RTD	8 (10)	Apr 8, 1954	Osaka, Japan	
51	Win	42–6–3	Terry Allen	UD	15	Oct 27, 1953	Korakuen Baseball Stadium, Japan	Retained NBA and The Ring flyweight titles
50	Loss	41–6–3	Leo Espinosa	RTD	7 (10)	Sep 19, 1953	Osaka Stadium, Osaka, Japan	
49	Win	41–5–3	Vic Herman	TKO	10 (10)	Jul 17, 1953	Korakuen Baseball Stadium, Japan	
48	Win	40–5–3	Tanny Campo	UD	15	May 18, 1953	Korakuen Baseball Stadium, Japan	Retained NBA and The Ring flyweight titles
47	Win	39–5–3	Mario Macias	UD	10	Apr 17, 1953	Japan	
46	Win	38–5–3	Dado Marino	UD	15	Nov 15, 1952	Korakuen Baseball Stadium, Japan	Retained NBA and The Ring flyweight titles
45	Win	37–5–3	Roy Higa	UD	10	Sep 26, 1952	Korakuen Baseball Stadium, Japan	
44	Win	36–5–3	Dado Marino	UD	15	May 19, 1952	Korakuen Baseball Stadium, Japan	Won NBA and The Ring flyweight titles
43	Win	35–5–3	Kyoichi Muto	RTD	6 (8)	Apr 4, 1952	Japan	
42	Win	34–5–3	Hiroshi Horiguchi	UD	10	Feb 9, 1952	Japan	Retained Japan bantamweight title
41	Win	33–5–3	Dado Marino	TKO	7 (10), 1:11	Dec 4, 1951	Honolulu Stadium, Honolulu, Hawaii	
40	Win	32–5–3	Takahisa Horiguchi	KO	6 (10), 0:42	Oct 25, 1951	Japan	Retained Japan flyweight title
39	Win	31–5–3	Hidemasa Nagashima	PTS	10	Sep 20, 1951	Japan	Won Japan bantamweight title
38	Loss	30–5–3	Dado Marino	SD	10	May 21, 1951	Korakuen Baseball Stadium, Japan	
37	Loss	30–4–3	Hidemasa Nagashima	DQ	8 (10), 2:25	Mar 17, 1951	Japan	Lost Japan bantamweight title
36	Win	30–3–3	Yukio Takahashi	DQ	7 (10)	Feb 3, 1951	Japan	
35	Win	29–3–3	Takashi Seno	PTS	10	Oct 26, 1950	Japan	Retained Japan bantamweight title
34	Win	28–3–3	Katsumi Kobayashi	KO	2 (10)	Sep 25, 1950	Japan	
33	Win	27–3–3	Hideo Kijima	KO	2 (10), 2:07	Jun 28, 1950	Japan	Retained Japan flyweight title
32	Win	26–3–3	Yoichiro Hanada	PTS	10	May 25, 1950	Japan	Retained Japan bantamweight title
31	Win	25–3–3	Yoshiaki Nario	PTS	8	Apr 14, 1950	Japan	
30	Win	24–3–3	Hiroshi Horiguchi	UD	10	Dec 15, 1949	Japan	Won Japan bantamweight title
29	Win	23–3–3	Kyoichi Muto	KO	3 (8)	Sep 28, 1949	Japan	
28	Win	22–3–3	Noboru Kushida	PTS	10	Jun 25, 1949	Japan	Retained Japan flyweight title
27	Win	21–3–3	Eijiro Yajima	PTS	10	May 2, 1949	Japan	
26	Win	20–3–3	Tomoyoshi Yanagida	KO	2 (10)	Mar 21, 1949	Japan	
25	Win	19–3–3	Yoichiro Hanada	KO	5 (10)	Jan 28, 1949	Japan	Won Japan flyweight title
24	Win	18–3–3	Noboru Kushida	SD	8	Oct 9, 1948	Japan	
23	Win	17–3–3	Eijiro Yajima	UD	8	Sep 11, 1948	Japan	
22	Win	16–3–3	Nobuyuki Ishimori	KO	2 (8)	Jul 30, 1948	Japan	
21	Win	15–3–3	Kiyoshi Nishimura	PTS	8	Jul 10, 1948	Japan	
20	Draw	14–3–3	Kunimatsu Suda	PTS	6	Jun 21, 1948	Japan	
19	Draw	14–3–2	Eijiro Yajima	PTS	8	Jun 6, 1948	Japan	
18	Win	14–3–1	Sadaji Wada	PTS	8	May 7, 1948	Japan	
17	Win	13–3–1	Kazumi Ueda	PTS	6	Apr 3, 1948	Fuji, Japan	
16	Win	12–3–1	Kazumi Ueda	PTS	6	Feb 15, 1948	Japan	
15	Win	11–3–1	Michiyosi Koizumi	KO	2 (6)	Dec 25, 1947	Japan	
14	Draw	10–3–1	Takeshi Makino	PTS	8	Oct 27, 1947	Japan	
13	Loss	10–3	Eijiro Yajima	PTS	8	Sep 11, 1947	Japan	
12	Loss	10–2	Yoichiro Hanada	PTS	8	Jul 18, 1947	Japan	
11	Win	10–1	Toshimitsu Kushihashi	PTS	6	Jul 6, 1947	Japan	
10	Win	9–1	Kazumi Ueda	PTS	6	Jun 27, 1947	Japan	
9	Loss	8–1	Noboru Kushida	KO	5 (8)	Dec 14, 1946	Japan	
8	Win	8–0	Sakae Suzuki	KO	1 (6)	Mar 28, 1944	Japan	
7	Win	7–0	Sadasuke Aoki	PTS	4	Mar 5, 1944	Japan	
6	Win	6–0	Shigeo Tanaka	PTS	4	Feb 10, 1944	Japan	
5	Win	5–0	Makoto Yamada	KO	1 (4)	Feb 6, 1944	Japan	
4	Win	4–0	Masao Ito	KO	1 (4)	Jan 20, 1944	Japan	
3	Win	3–0	Tomisaburo Oura	PTS	4	Dec 23, 1943	Japan	
2	Win	2–0	Saichi Kubota	KO	1 (4)	Dec 10, 1943	Japan	
1	Win	1–0	Jumpo Umiyama	KO	1 (4)	Nov 26, 1943	Japan	

== Titles in boxing ==
=== Major world titles ===
- NBA (WBA) flyweight champion (112 lbs)

=== The Ring magazine titles ===
- The Ring flyweight champion (112 lbs)

=== Regional/International titles ===
- Japan flyweight champion (112 lbs)
- Japan bantamweight champion (118 lbs) (2×)

=== Undisputed titles ===
- Undisputed flyweight champion (Note: The NYSAC stopped awarding their flyweight title during this period, as such, Yoshio was recognized as the undisputed flyweight world champion.)

== See also ==
- List of flyweight boxing champions
- List of WBA world champions
- List of The Ring world champions
- List of Japanese boxing world champions
- Boxing in Japan

== Notes and references ==
=== References ===
Sporting positions
World boxing titles
Preceded by Dado Marino	NYSAC flyweight champion May 19, 1952 - November 26, 1954	Succeeded by Pascual Perez
Preceded by Dado Marino	WBA flyweight champion May 19, 1952 - November 26, 1954	Succeeded by Pascual Perez
Preceded by Dado Marino	The Ring flyweight champion May 19, 1952 - November 26, 1954	Succeeded by Pascual Perez
Preceded by Dado Marino	Undisputed flyweight champion May 19, 1952 - November 26, 1954	Succeeded by Pascual Perez
