= Pascual Pérez (boxer) =

Argentine boxer

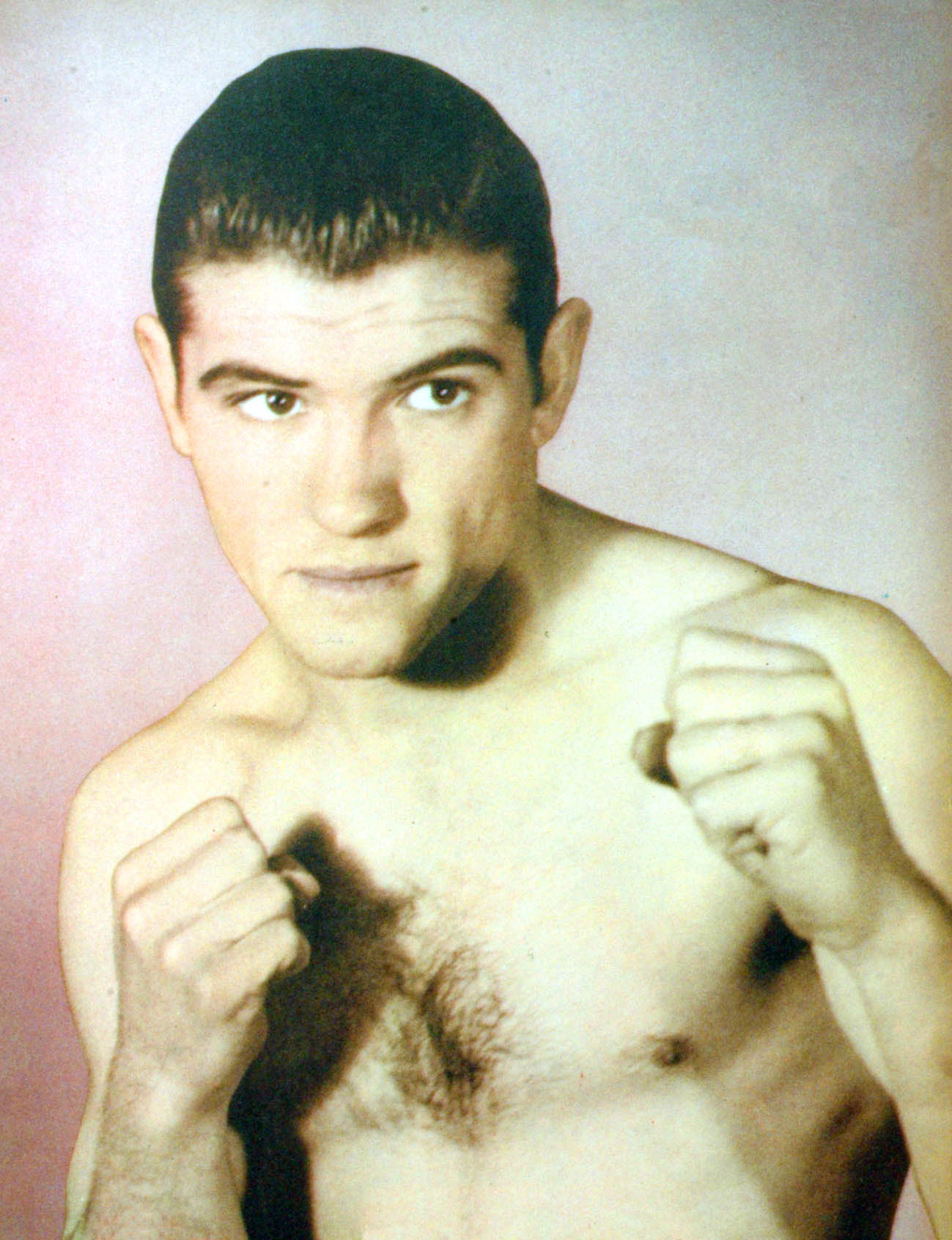

Personal information
- Nickname: El León Mendocino
- Born: May 4, 1926 Mendoza, Argentina
- Died: January 22, 1977 (aged 50)
- Height: 4 ft 11 in (1.50 m)
- Weight: Flyweight

Boxing career
- Stance: Orthodox

Boxing record
- Total fights: 92
- Wins: 84
- Win by KO: 57
- Losses: 7
- Draws: 1
Medal record
Men's boxing
Representing Argentina
Olympic Games
Gold medal – first place	1948 London	Flyweight

Pascual Nicolás Pérez (May 4, 1926 – January 22, 1977) was an Argentine flyweight boxer. Pérez was born in Tupungato in the Mendoza Province of Argentina, he went on to make history by becoming Argentina's first world boxing champion.

Pérez usually did poor at the ticket gates in Argentina after he became world champion, forcing him to defend his world title on the road many times and to become known as a world-traveling champion. His first international success was a gold medal at the 1948 Summer Olympics in United Kingdom.

He and Delfo Cabrera were the only two Argentines to be an Olympic gold medalists in the London Olympics of 1948. Perez reigned as World Champion from 1954 to 1960. As an amateur he fought 125 bouts. Turning professional in 1952, he fought 92 fights (84 wins, 7 losses and 1 draw), in which he won 57 fights by knockout, a record that places him in an elite group of boxers who have won more than 50 fights by knockouts. He defended his title against nine contenders in a span of six years. He is considered one of the three greatest flyweight boxers in history alongside Miguel Canto and Jimmy Wilde. Along with Carlos Monzon, he is considered one of the best fighters ever to box. He has been inducted in the International Boxing Hall of Fame. In 2004, the American Boxing Confederation posthumously declared him the South American champion.

== Early life ==
Pérez was born into a family of winemakers in the Uco Valley, Tupungato district of the Mendoza province, where he was the youngest of nine children. He worked as a laborer for the family since childhood. In 1942, at age 16, Perez started boxing at the Rodeo Deportivo de la Cruz, led by Felipe Segura, Perez showing superb skill and power, unusual for a lighter weight boxer. Though naturally left-handed he trained right-handed; his height, which only reached 1.52 m as an adult, was smaller than the rest of his opponents in the flyweight division.

== Amateur career ==
He debuted as an amateur in January 1944 and would contest in 125 bouts winning 16 amateur championships, including the gold medal at the 1948 London Olympics. The first tournament he won was the Mendocino Novice Championship, in March 1944, just two months after his debut.

That same year, his father had to pay money to hire a farm laborer who could replace Perez in the vineyard, as a condition for granting legal consent required by the regulations on parental rights. His parents kept a reluctant attitude towards his plans, and he began fighting under the name Pablo Pérez to avoid being caught by them.

In 1946 and 1947, Pascual Perez won the Mendoza, Argentine and Latin American championships, and in 1948, he won the tournament where the Argentina Olympic boxing team was selected, every member of this team won medals at the Olympic Games.

=== London Olympics ===
In the 1948 London Olympics, Pascual Perez (then 22 years old) won the tenth Olympic gold medal for Argentina (in the same Games, Argentina won two others) and the sixth for boxing (the same day another gold medal was obtained by fellow Argentine Rafael Iglesias). Perez had never fought outside of South America and was to compete in the same division with, and possibly fight against, the European champion, the Spanish Luis Martínez Zapata who, despite both him and Perez being respected by press and fans alike, was favored to win the gold. Initially Pascual Perez was mistakenly disqualified from the tournament when his official weight was mixed up with Arnoldo Parés, a boxer in a heavier class. However, after the confusion was cleared, Perez was cleared to box and the disqualification was rescinded.

Perez first faced the Filipino Ricardo Adolfo, winning by RSC (stoppage by the referee) in the second round. In the second match he faced the South African Desmond Williams, also winning by RSC, this time, in the third round. In the quarterfinals he defeated the Belgian Alex Bollaert and in the semifinals he beat the Czech František Majdloch.

In the finals, Pérez faced the Italian Spartacus Bandinelli (28 years old), who had an upset victory in the quarterfinals over the favored Martínez Zapata. In the first round, Perez dominated the match with his aggressive style, controlling the initial offensive of the Italian, with several successions of punches landed, including a strong right he landed at the end of the round. The second round was very intense, with Bandinelli fighting aggressively to recover points and Perez answering blow for blow, using his greater mobility to score points with his left forehand, taking advantage of the Italian's tendency to keep his guard down. In the third round Perez again took the offensive from the start with a succession of direct left and right punches to Bandinelli's face. Momentum swung several times, eventually with the Italian taking the offensive. Then the Argentine stopped the Italian's counterattack with an uppercut, and the round ended with each exchanging blows in the center of the ring.

Felix Frascara of Figura magazine, covered the match and after Perez' victory commented:

Pascual Perez has been, round by round, climbing his way to fame: first (he was) champion of his city Mendoza, (later of) his province; in short order he became the Argentine River Plate and Latin American flyweight champion. His rotund farm efficiency mainly in the strong sense of time and distance, timed to perfection. Then, he's aggressive; (having) an extremely strong punch in proportion to his weight; and (he) utilizes all his resources in full speed, without losing the line. We could say that he was the best fighter of the Argentine team and one of the best stylists in the tournament.

Perez was labeled a hero in Mendoza, where the provincial parliament gave him a house and a job. Notably, in the next tournament held to select Argentine boxers for the 1952 Olympic Games, Perez lost a match by split decision, to Francisco Calvagno, being eliminated from the tournament. The chosen Argentine representative was Alberto Barenghi, who was eliminated in the first fight. After his removal, Perez decided to enter professional boxing, and two years later became the first world boxing champion from Argentina. His last amateur fight was November 14 of 1952, in the Golden Strip Club winning by points in five rounds against Paul Rapretti.

== Professional career ==
Pérez made his professional career with manager Lazarus Koci, who also managed José María Mono Gatica, and reorganized professional boxing in Argentina.

On December 5, 1952, Pérez beat José Ciorino by knockout in round four at the small Argentine city of Gerly, to begin his professional boxing career. After winning his first six fights by knockout, he challenged Marcelo Quiroga on November 11 of 1953, for the Argentine Flyweight title, winning the fight by a fourth-round knockout at Buenos Aires.

Pérez's knockout streak reached 18 knockouts in a row, and it lasted until he met Juan Bishop, on April 22, 1954, winning by a ten-round decision.

On July 24 of that year, and with a record of 23 wins, no losses, with 22 wins by knockout, Pérez met Yoshio Shirai, who, coincidentally, had been Japan's first world champion in history, in a non-title fight held at Buenos Aires. The Argentine ambassador in Japan, Carlos Quiroz, at the direction of then-President Juan D. Peron, took steps to set up a match in Buenos Aires against Shirai, without the title at stake. The fight took ten rounds at Luna Park on July 24 of 1954, with the presence of President Perón, sitting ringside . The match ended tied and was an extraordinary event in the country, for the first time an Argentine professional boxer was not defeated by a world champion. The tie forced Yoshio Shirai, as was standard in the boxing world then, to grant a rematch against the Argentine boxer again in a fight with the title at stake.

=== Flyweight world title ===
On November 26 of 1954, Pérez fought what was both his first fight abroad outside the Olympics, and his first world title fight. The Argentine knocked down the champion in the 2nd round and again in the 12th, in which the champion returned to his corner almost knocked out. From rounds 13 - 15, Perez nearly knocked out Shirai several times. After the fight, the score reflected a wide difference unanimously in favor of the Argentine. Referee Jack Sullivan had it 146–139, Judge Bill Pacheco, 143–139, and judge Kuniharu Hayashi, 146-143 all in Perez' favor. He made history by beating Shirai by a fifteen-round decision, becoming Argentina's first world champion boxer, in Tokyo. Pascualito became the smallest flyweight boxer to win a title.

Over the course of Pérez's next fights, he would defend his title only nine times, lose for the first time, and fight in Brazil, the Dominican Republic, Curaçao, Japan, Paraguay, the Philippines, Thailand, Uruguay and Venezuela. Many of his fights would have been title fights, but some of his opponents were not able to make the Flyweight division's 112 pound weight limit, so Pérez often had to settle for non-title wins instead. He lost his undefeated record to Japan's Sadao Yaoita on January 16 of 1959, by a ten-round decision in Tokyo. Among the fighters he defeated to retain his world title were Dai Dower (by a first-round knockout), Dommy Ursua (by a fifteen-round decision) and Yaoita in a rematch, by a thirteenth-round knockout.

Pérez would lose his title to another first time world champion, Thailand's Pone Kingpetch, who made history for his country by beating Pérez by a fifteen-round decision at Bangkok on April 16, 1960. A rematch between Pérez and Kingpetch was fought on September 22 of the same year, at Los Angeles, but Pérez's first fight in the United States was also his first knockout defeat, as he was beaten in eight rounds by Kingpetch.

=== Later fights ===
Pérez won his next twenty-eight bouts, mostly against nondescript opposition but he did score a pair of victories over the once-promising but by then fading Uruguayan Waldemiro Torres. Then, after dropping a split decision to Filipino veteran Leo Zulueta and outpointing Panamanian journeyman Manuel Moreno in his next two bouts, he faced perennial world title contender Bernardo Caraballo in Colombia on July 23, 1963. Pérez lost by a ten-round decision.

He finished his career with fights in Ecuador, Mexico and Panama, going 1-2 including losing by third-round knockout to future world flyweight champion Efren Torres in his fight on Mexican soil. His final fight, at the age of 37, was against Panamanian Eugenio Hurtado, who won by technical knock-out on March 15, 1964.

Pérez had a record of 84 wins, 7 losses and 1 draw, with 58 knockouts, numbers which place him in the exclusive group of boxers to have won 50 or more fights by knockout.

== Professional boxing record ==
92 fights	84 wins	7 losses
By knockout	57	3
By decision	27	4
Draws	1	

No.	Result	Record	Opponent	Type	Round	Date	Location	Notes
92	Loss	84–7–1	Eugenio Hurtado	TKO	6 (10)	Mar 15, 1964	Gimnasio Nacional, Panama City, Panamá, Panama	
91	Loss	84–6–1	Efren Torres	KO	3 (10)	Oct 19, 1963	Arena Progreso, Guadalajara, Jalisco, Mexico	
90	Win	84–5–1	Adolfo Osses	PTS	10	Aug 9, 1963	Guayaquil, Guayas, Venezuela	
89	Loss	83–5–1	Bernardo Caraballo	UD	10	Jul 26, 1963	Bogotá, Colombia	
88	Win	83–4–1	Manuel Moreno	UD	10	Jun 16, 1963	Gimnasio Nacional, Panama City, Panamá, Panama	
87	Loss	82–4–1	Leo Zulueta	SD	10	Apr 30, 1963	Rizal Memorial Sports Complex, Manila, Metro Manila, Philippines	
86	Win	82–3–1	Cirilo Avellaneda	KO	7 (10)	Apr 12, 1963	Bahía Blanca, Buenos Aires, Argentina	
85	Win	81–3–1	Juan Carlos Moreyra	PTS	10	Apr 5, 1963	Mercedes, Corrientes, Argentina	
84	Win	80–3–1	Rodolfo Trivis	PTS	10	Feb 16, 1963	Montevideo, Montevideo, Uruguay	
83	Win	79–3–1	Miguel Herrera	PTS	10	Feb 1, 1963	San Luis, San Luis, Argentina	
82	Win	78–3–1	Cirilo Avellaneda	PTS	10	Jan 25, 1963	Villa Dolores, Buenos Aires, Argentina	
81	Win	77–3–1	Juan Carlos Moreyra	TKO	8 (10)	Dec 8, 1962	Córdoba, Córdoba, Argentina	
80	Win	76–3–1	Martin Luque	KO	5 (?)	Jun 15, 1962	San Salvador, Jujuy, Argentina	
79	Win	75–3–1	Rodolfo Trivis	PTS	10	Jun 9, 1962	San Miguel, Tucumán, Argentina	
78	Win	74–3–1	Cirilo Avellaneda	KO	5 (10)	May 19, 1962	Luna Park, Buenos Aires, Argentina	
77	Win	73–3–1	Martin Luque	TKO	5 (?)	May 2, 1962	Santiago del Estero, Santiago del Estero, Argentina	
76	Win	72–3–1	Juan Carlos Moreyra	TKO	3 (10)	Apr 27, 1962	Salta, Salta, Argentina	
75	Win	71–3–1	Ursino Bernal	TKO	6 (10)	Apr 21, 1962	San Miguel, Tucumán, Argentina	
74	Win	70–3–1	Rodolfo Trivis	PTS	10	Mar 2, 1962	Miramar, Córdoba, Argentina	
73	Win	69–3–1	Ursino Bernal	PTS	10	Feb 23, 1962	Balcarce, Buenos Aires, Argentina	
72	Win	68–3–1	Demetrio Acosta	KO	2 (10)	Jan 27, 1962	Nueve de Julio, San Juan, Argentina	
71	Win	67–3–1	Rodolfo Trivis	PTS	10	Dec 22, 1961	Córdoba, Córdoba, Argentina	
70	Win	66–3–1	Alberto García	TKO	6 (?)	Oct 21, 1961	Rosario, Jujuy Province, Jujuy, Argentina	
69	Win	65–3–1	José Diaz	KO	7 (?)	Oct 12, 1961	Esquel, Chubut, Argentina	
68	Win	64–3–1	Waldemiro Torres	KO	3 (?)	Sep 5, 1961	Río Gallegos, Santa Cruz, Argentina	
67	Win	63–3–1	Simon Rios	KO	6 (?)	Aug 19, 1961	Trelew, Chubut	
66	Win	62–3–1	Waldemiro Torres	KO	8 (?)	Jul 29, 1961	Río Gallegos, Santa Cruz, Argentina	
65	Win	61–3–1	Juan Montevero	KO	5 (?)	Jul 15, 1961	Río Gallegos, Santa Cruz, Argentina	
64	Win	60–3–1	Hugo Villarreal	KO	3 (?)	Jul 8, 1961	Punta Alta, Buenos Aires, Argentina	
63	Win	59–3–1	Francisco Bahamondes	TKO	3 (?)	May 19, 1961	Cipolletti, Río Negro, Argentina	
62	Win	58–3–1	Juan Montevero	TKO	6 (?)	May 13, 1961	General Roca, Río Negro, Argentina	
61	Win	57–3–1	Pablo Sosa	KO	3 (10)	Apr 9, 1961	San Pedro, Buenos Aires, Argentina	
60	Win	56–3–1	Juan Carlos Moreyra	PTS	10	Apr 1, 1961	Quilmes, Buenos Aires, Argentina	
59	Win	55–3–1	Hugo Villarreal	TKO	4 (?)	Mar 1, 1961	Avellaneda, Buenos Aires, Argentina	
58	Loss	54–3–1	Pone Kingpetch	TKO	8 (15)	Sep 22, 1960	Grand Olympic Auditorium, Los Angeles, California, U.S.	For NBA and The Ring flyweight titles
57	Loss	54–2–1	Pone Kingpetch	SD	15	Apr 16, 1960	Lumpinee Boxing Stadium, Bangkok, Thailand	Lost NBA and The Ring flyweight titles
56	Win	54–1–1	Sadao Yaoita	KO	13 (15)	Nov 5, 1959	Ogimachi Pool, Osaka, Osaka, Japan	Retained NBA and The Ring flyweight titles
55	Win	53–1–1	Kenji Yonekura	UD	15	Aug 10, 1959	Metropolitan Gymnasium, Tokyo, Japan	Retained NBA and The Ring flyweight titles
54	Win	52–1–1	Kenji Yonekura	PTS	10	Feb 18, 1959	Tokyo, Japan	
53	Loss	51–1–1	Sadao Yaoita	UD	10	Jan 16, 1959	Metropolitan Gymnasium, Tokyo, Japan	
52	Win	51–0–1	Dommy Ursua	UD	15	Dec 15, 1958	Rizal Memorial Sports Complex, Manila, Metro Manila, Philippines	Retained NBA and The Ring flyweight titles
51	Win	50–0–1	Tito Raggone	UD	10	Nov 22, 1958	Rif-stadion, Willemstad, Curaçao, Netherlands Antilles	
50	Win	49–0–1	Tito Raggone	PTS	10	Aug 9, 1958	Santo Domingo, Distrito Nacional, Dominican Republic	
49	Win	48–0–1	Ramón Arias	UD	15	Apr 19, 1958	Nuevo Circo, Caracas, Miranda, Venezuela	Retained NBA and The Ring flyweight titles
48	Win	47–0–1	Ricardo Valdez	KO	8 (?)	Mar 22, 1958	Buenos Aires, Argentina	
47	Win	46–0–1	Young Martin	KO	3 (15)	Dec 7, 1957	Club Atlético Boca Juniors, Buenos Aires, Argentina	Retained NBA and The Ring flyweight titles
46	Win	45–0–1	Conrado Moreyra	PTS	10	Sep 13, 1957	La Plata, Buenos Aires, Argentina	
45	Win	44–0–1	Pablo Sosa	KO	3 (10)	Aug 17, 1957	Club Ramon Santamarina, Tandil, Buenos Aires, Argentina	
44	Win	43–0–1	Urbieta Sosa	TKO	4 (?)	Aug 2, 1957	Santa Fe, Santa Fe, Argentina	
43	Win	42–0–1	Luis Jimenez	UD	10	Jul 12, 1957	Estadio Babilonia, Buenos Aires, Argentina	
42	Win	41–0–1	Dai Dower	KO	1 (15)	Mar 30, 1957	Club San Lorenzo de Almagro, Buenos Aires, Argentina	Retained NBA and The Ring flyweight titles
41	Win	40–0–1	Conrado Moreyra	PTS	10	Dec 12, 1956	Buenos Aires, Argentina	
40	Win	39–0–1	Hernan Rojas	RTD	8 (10)	Sep 28, 1956	Estadio Comuneros, Asunción, Paraguay	
39	Win	38–0–1	Conrado Moreyra	PTS	10	Sep 6, 1956	Ginásio do Pacaembu, São Paulo, São Paulo, Brazil	
38	Win	37–0–1	Hector Almaraz	KO	3 (10)	Aug 25, 1956	Estadio Norte, Rosario, Santa Fe	
37	Win	36–0–1	Ricardo Valdez	TKO	5 (10)	Aug 4, 1956	Club Ramon Santamarina, Tandil, Buenos Aires, Argentina	
36	Win	35–0–1	Oscar Suarez	TKO	11 (15)	Jun 30, 1956	Montevideo, Montevideo, Uruguay	Retained NBA and The Ring flyweight titles
35	Win	34–0–1	Pablo Sosa	KO	4 (10)	Jun 15, 1956	Martínez, Buenos Aires, Argentina	
34	Win	33–0–1	Ricardo Valdez	TKO	6 (?)	Jun 8, 1956	Bahía Blanca, Buenos Aires, Argentina	
33	Win	32–0–1	Marcelo Quiroga	PTS	10	Mar 31, 1956	Buenos Aires, Argentina	
32	Win	31–0–1	Antonio Gomez	TKO	2 (10)	Mar 21, 1956	Buenos Aires, Argentina	
31	Win	30–0–1	Antonio Gomez	PTS	10	Feb 10, 1956	Mar del Plata, Buenos Aires, Argentina	
30	Win	29–0–1	Leo Espinosa	UD	15	Jan 11, 1956	Luna Park, Buenos Aires, Argentina	Retained NBA and The Ring flyweight titles
29	Win	28–0–1	Danny Kid	PTS	10	Oct 22, 1955	Buenos Aires, Argentina	
28	Win	27–0–1	Alberto Palomeque	KO	4 (10)	Aug 26, 1955	Catamarca, Catamarca, Argentina	
27	Win	26–0–1	Yoshio Shirai	KO	5 (15)	May 30, 1955	Korakuen Stadium, Tokyo, Japan	Retained NBA and The Ring flyweight titles
26	Win	25–0–1	Alberto Barenghi	KO	3 (12)	Apr 13, 1955	Buenos Aires, Argentina	
25	Win	24–0–1	Yoshio Shirai	UD	15	Nov 26, 1954	Korakuen Stadium, Tokyo, Japan	Won NBA and The Ring flyweight titles
24	Draw	23–0–1	Yoshio Shirai	PTS	10	Jul 24, 1954	Luna Park, Buenos Aires, Argentina	
23	Win	23–0	Marcelo Quiroga	KO	4 (10)	Jun 25, 1954	La Plata, Buenos Aires, Argentina	
22	Win	22–0	Pablo Sosa	RTD	8 (10)	Jun 12, 1954	Comodoro Rivadavia, Chubut, Argentina	
21	Win	21–0	Domingo Sandoval	KO	4 (10)	Jun 5, 1954	Comodoro Rivadavia, Chubut, Argentina	
20	Win	20–0	Vicente Bruno	KO	3 (?)	May 19, 1954	Buenos Aires, Argentina	
19	Win	19–0	Juan Bishop	PTS	10	Apr 22, 1954	Buenos Aires, Argentina	
18	Win	18–0	Pablo Sosa	KO	2 (10)	Mar 24, 1954	Luna Park, Buenos Aires, Argentina	
17	Win	17–0	Pablo Sosa	KO	6 (10)	Mar 12, 1954	Catamarca, Catamarca, Argentina	
16	Win	16–0	Nicolas Páez	KO	1 (10)	Feb 24, 1954	Buenos Aires, Argentina	
15	Win	15–0	Oliden Rojas	KO	3 (10)	Feb 13, 1954	Club Ramon Santamarina, Tandil, Buenos Aires, Argentina	
14	Win	14–0	Marcelo Quiroga	TKO	4 (10)	Feb 6, 1954	Luna Park, Buenos Aires, Argentina	
13	Win	13–0	Antonio Zapata	RTD	5 (10)	Jan 29, 1954	Catamarca, Catamarca, Argentina	
12	Win	12–0	José Domingo Luna	TKO	2 (10)	Jan 19, 1954	San Miguel, Tucumán, Argentina	
11	Win	11–0	Nestor Rojas	RTD	2 (10)	Jan 8, 1954	Catamarca, Catamarca, Argentina	Retained Argentine flyweight title
10	Win	10–0	Roberto Romero	KO	2 (10)	Dec 30, 1953	Uspallata, Mendoza, Argentina	
9	Win	9–0	Hernan Rojas	KO	2 (10)	Dec 23, 1953	Catamarca, Catamarca, Argentina	
8	Win	8–0	Eduardo Lliuzi	RTD	1 (10)	Nov 25, 1953	Luna Park, Buenos Aires, Argentina	
7	Win	7–0	Marcelo Quiroga	TKO	4 (12)	Nov 11, 1953	Luna Park, Buenos Aires, Argentina	Won vacant Argentine flyweight title
6	Win	6–0	Juan Godoy	KO	4 (10)	Mar 30, 1953	Buenos Aires, Argentina	
5	Win	5–0	Miguel Carrasco	KO	5 (10)	Mar 16, 1953	Mendoza, Mendoza, Argentina	
4	Win	4–0	Mario Ahumada	TKO	3 (10)	Feb 20, 1953	Mendoza, Mendoza, Argentina	
3	Win	3–0	Ramon Stronatti	RTD	2 (8)	Jan 3, 1953	Mendoza, Mendoza, Argentina	
2	Win	2–0	Jorge Flores	KO	3 (6)	Dec 19, 1952	San Fernando, Buenos Aires, Argentina	
1	Win	1–0	José Ciorino	TKO	4 (6)	Dec 5, 1952	Gerli, Buenos Aires, Argentina	

== Honors and legacy ==
He has been inducted into both the International Boxing Hall of Fame and the World Boxing Hall of Fame. On his death in 1977, Pascual Pérez was interred in the La Chacarita Cemetery in Buenos Aires, Argentina.

In 1955 he was awarded the Gold Olimpia Award. Perez in 1977 entered the International Boxing Hall of Fame organized by the magazine Ring. In 1995, the Hall of Fame in Canastota (IBHOF) did the same, where he is included with Argentine boxers Carlos Monzon, Nicolino Locche, and Victor Galindez. In 2004, he was officially declared the South American champion, by the American Boxing Confederation.

The Mendoza Boxing Palace of the Mendoza Boxing Federation, reopened in 2007, was named Estadio Pascual Perez, in his memory.

In 1954, writer Rafael Lauria and musicians Hector Maure and Sergio Gasparini composed a tango titled "The great champion," recorded by Hector Maure, part of which reads:

Pascualito handsome Creole
're our first champion.
today Argentines breasts
are full of emotion.

— The great champion (tango)

Prominent journalist Chon Romero praised Pascual Perez in the following statement:

He was addicted to striking bell to bell, perhaps from the awareness a fighter gains when punches connect. His small stature (under five feet), was no obstacle for his bionic arms and iron will, so hold four more years of flyweight champion of the world, the best time for this category

In 1980, with the first edition of the Konex Awards, the Konex Foundation awarded a Diploma of Merit to Perez as one of the top 5 boxers in the history of Argentina.

Boxrec.com ranks Pérez as the number one flyweight of all time.

Throughout his career Pascual Perez won 18 tournaments, including:

== Titles in boxing ==
=== Amateur titles ===
- 1944: Mendocino Tournament Novices
- 1944: Argentine Championship Novice
- 1945: Open Tournament Salta.
- 1946 Mendocino Veterans Championships
- 1946: Veteran Argentine Championship
- 1946: Latin American Championship (shared)
- 1947 Mendocino Veterans Championships
- 1947: Veteran Argentine Championship
- 1947: Latin American Championship (shared)
- 1948 Vintage Championship
- 1948: Veteran Argentine Championship (Olympic Team)
- 1948: Olympic Champion in London
- 1950: Mendocino Veterans Championships
- 1950: Veteran Argentine Championship
- 1950: Latin American Championship
- 1950: Good Neighbour Tournament (Lima)

=== Professional titles ===
- 1953: Argentine Flyweight Championship
- 1954: NBA (WBA) Flyweight Championship
- 1954: The Ring Flyweight Championship
- 2004: South American Champion, officially declared post mortem by the American Boxing Confederation.

=== Undisputed titles ===
- 1954: Undisputed Flyweight Championship (Note: The NYSAC stopped awarding their flyweight title during this period, as such, Pascual was recognized as the undisputed flyweight world champion.)

== Notes and references ==
=== References ===
Awards and achievements
Preceded by (Argentina) Juan Manuel Fangio	Olimpia de Oro; 1955	Succeeded by (Argentina) Jorge Bátiz
Sporting positions
Preceded by (Japan) Yoshio Shirai	World Flyweight Champion; November 26, 1954 – April 16, 1960	Succeeded by (Thailand) Pone Kingpetch
