= Young Martin =

Spanish Flyweight boxer

Martin Marco Voto (March 5, 1931 – June 17, 2006) better known as Young Martin, was a Spaniard professional boxer in the Flyweight division. He won various regional level titles and challenged once for the world's flyweight championship.

== European Boxing Union champion ==
Martin challenged Welsh boxer, until then undefeated (27-0) Dai Dower for the EBU's flyweight title on Monday, 3 October 1955 at the ice rink in Nottingham, England. The then 24 year old Martin won the championship by knocking Dower out in round twelve of a scheduled 15 rounder contest. Martin won the contest with a devastating body attack, producing a number of knockdowns (and ultimately, a knock-out) with hard punches to Dower's body. Martin successfully defended that title three times until losing it on his fourth defense, beaten by Finnish fighter Risto Luukkonen on Friday, September 4, 1959 in Helsinki, Finland, by a fifteen rounds decision.

== World championship fight ==
In the midst of his reign as European champion, the Spaniard traveled to Argentina to face world flyweight champion, International Boxing Hall of Fame member Pascual Perez. Perez and Martin duly met on Saturday, December 7, 1957 at the Club Atletico Boca Juniors in Buenos Aires. Perez dominated and stopped Martin in round three to retain the world title.

== Retirement ==
Martin retired after an eight-rounds decision defeat to Victor Carrascosa, which took place on September 6, 1962 at the Plaza de Toros de Vista Alegre in Bilbao.

== Career in review ==
A former Spain national and European Boxing Union flyweight champion and one-time world title challenger, Martin retired with a record of 71 wins, 17 defeats and 5 draws (ties) in 93 professional boxing contests, with 28 of his wins and 5 of his losses by way of knockout.

== Death ==
Young Martin died on June 17, 2006.
