= Terry Allen (boxer) =

English boxer (1924–1987)

Personal information
- Nationality: British
- Born: Edward Albert Govier; 18 June 1924 Islington, England
- Died: 8 April 1987 (aged 62)
- Weight: Flyweight

Boxing career
- Stance: Orthodox

Boxing record
- Total fights: 75
- Wins: 61
- Win by KO: 18
- Losses: 13
- Draws: 1

Terry Allen (8 June 1924 – 8 April 1987) was an English flyweight boxer. During his career, he became British, Commonwealth, European and World flyweight champion.

== Family ==
Born in Islington, London, Allen's father was a professional boxer. His mother died when he was two, and he was raised by his grandmother. Six of his cousins were also professional boxers.

== Amateur career ==
He started boxing when he was nine and won a schoolboy championship. During his amateur career, he won 102 out of 107 contests.

== Professional career ==
Managed by Johnny Sharpe, Allen had his first professional fight in September 1942, at the age of eighteen. He beat Jim Thomas on points over six rounds at Caledonian Road Baths, Islington.

He then proceeded to win his first thirty-two fights. In 1942, during the Second World War, he joined the Royal Navy, and while stationed at Alexandria, Egypt, he fought and won fifteen bouts, between May 1944 and December 1945. By late 1945, he was considered chief flyweight contender by Ring magazine.

His first defeat was in May 1946, against Alex Murphy by a knockout, in the sixth round at Harringay Arena. He suffered a second defeat in March 1947, when he was knocked out in the first round by Rinty Monaghan.

In March 1948, Allen beat Dickie O'Sullivan on a disqualification to take the BBBofC South East Area flyweight title. In his next fight he was beaten on points by Jackie Bryce.

In February he beat Monaghan over 8 rounds, and in June 1949 beat Norman Tennant in an eliminator to get a shot in September at Monaghan's British title, with the European, Empire and world titles also at stake. They fought in Monaghan's home town of Belfast, and the result after fifteen rounds was a draw.

Shortly after this fight, Monaghan retired, relinquishing his titles, and in April 1950, Allen fought Honore Pratesi of France for the vacant European and World flyweight titles. The fight was held at Harringay Arena and Allen won on points over fifteen rounds to gain both titles.

In August 1950, he defended his World title against Dado Marino of the United States. The fight was held in Honolulu and Marino won a unanimous points decision to take the title.

In October 1950, Allen lost his European title when he defended it in Nottingham against Jan Sneyers of Belgium. Sneyers won on points, but the British crowd thought that Allen had won, and booed the decision.

In June 1951, Allen fought Vic Herman for the British flyweight title vacated by Rinty Monaghan. The fight was in Leicester and Allen won on points.

In November 1951, Allen had a re-match with Dado Marino for the World flyweight title. The fight was in Honolulu, and Marino won again by a unanimous decision.

In March 1952, he fought against Teddy Gardner for the British, Commonwealth and European flyweight titles. The fight was held in Newcastle upon Tyne, and Gardner won on points to take all three titles. Shortly afterwards Gardner retired leaving the titles vacant.

In October 1952, Allen fought for the vacant British flyweight title, against Eric Marsden. He won the title when the fight was stopped in the sixth after Marsden collapsed.

In October 1953, he had another shot at a World title when he fought Yoshio Shirai, in Tokyo. Unfortunately for Allen, the Japanese won a unanimous decision.

In February 1954, Allen defended his British title against Eric Marsden, who he had beaten previously. He won again, this time on a disqualification in the fifth round.

Allen was knocked out in the second round by the unbeaten Dai Dower in March, and his last fight was an unsuccessful challenge for the vacant European flyweight title. He fought Nazzareno Giannelli, in Milan, Italy, but the Italian won on points.

He was set to defend his British title against Marsden in November, but on 30 September 1954 announced his retirement from boxing.

== Retirement ==
Allen had worked as a barrow boy at the beginning of his boxing career, and after retiring, he was able to open his own vegetable business in Islington market.

== Professional boxing record ==
75 fights	61 wins	13 losses
By knockout	18	3
By decision	41	10
By disqualification	2	0
Draws	1	

No.	Result	Record	Opponent	Type	Round(s)	Date	Age	Location	Notes
75	Loss	62–12–1	Nazzareno Giannelli	PTS	15	10 Sep 1954	30 years, 155 days	Palazzo del Ghiaccio, Milan, Lombardia, Italy	For vacant European flyweight title
74	Loss	62–11–1	Dai Dower	KO	2 (10)	23 Mar 1954	29 years, 349 days	Earls Court Empress Hall, Kensington, London, England, U.K.	
73	Win	62–10–1	Eric Marsden	DQ	5 (15)	16 Feb 1954	29 years, 314 days	Harringay Arena, Harringay, London, England, U.K.	Retained BBBofC flyweight title; Mardsen DQ'd for a low blow
72	Loss	61–10–1	Yoshio Shirai	UD	15	27 Oct 1953	29 years, 202 days	Korakuen Baseball Stadium, Tokyo, Japan	For NBA and The Ring flyweight titles
71	Loss	61–9–1	Gaetano Annaloro	PTS	10	28 Apr 1953	29 years, 20 days	Harringay Arena, Harringay, London, England, U.K.	
70	Win	61–8–1	Eric Marsden	TKO	6 (15)	21 Oct 1952	28 years, 196 days	Harringay Arena, Harringay, London, England, U.K.	Won vacant BBBofC flyweight title
69	Win	60–8–1	Jimmy Pearce	PTS	12	25 Aug 1952	28 years, 139 days	Engineer's Club, West Hartlepool, County Durham, England, U.K.	
68	Loss	59–8–1	Teddy Gardner	PTS	15	17 Mar 1952	27 years, 344 days	New St James Hall, Newcastle, Tyne and Wear, England, U.K.	For European, vacant Commonwealth and BBBofC flyweight titles
67	Loss	59–7–1	Maurice Sandeyron	PTS	10	29 Jan 1952	27 years, 296 days	Royal Albert Hall, Kensington, London, England, U.K.	
66	Loss	59–6–1	Dado Marino	UD	15	1 Nov 1951	27 years, 207 days	Honolulu Stadium, Honolulu, Hawaii	For NBA and The Ring flyweight titles
65	Win	59–5–1	Vic Herman	PTS	15	11 Jun 1951	27 years, 64 days	Granby Halls, Leicester, Leicestershire, London, England, U.K.	Won vacant BBBofC flyweight title
64	Win	58–5–1	Henry Carpenter	PTS	10	30 Apr 1951	27 years, 22 days	Earls Court Empress Hall, Kensington, London, England, U.K.	
63	Win	57–5–1	Jimmy Pearce	PTS	8	11 Apr 1951	27 years, 3 days	Prince of Wales Baths, Kentish Town, London, England, U.K.	
62	Loss	56–5–1	Jean Sneyers	PTS	15	30 Oct 1950	26 years, 205 days	Ice Rink, Nottingham, Nottinghamshire, England, U.K.	Lost European flyweight titles
61	Loss	56–4–1	Dado Marino	UD	15	1 Aug 1950	26 years, 115 days	Honolulu Stadium, Honolulu, Hawaii	Lost NBA and The Ring flyweight titles
60	Win	56–3–1	Honore Pratesi	PTS	15	25 Apr 1950	26 years, 17 days	Harringay Arena, Harringay, London, England, U.K.	Won vacant NBA, European, and The Ring flyweight titles
59	Win	55–3–1	Peter Fay	PTS	8	15 Feb 1950	25 years, 313 days	Prince of Wales Baths, Kentish Town, London, England, U.K.	
58	Draw	54–3–1	Rinty Monaghan	PTS	15	30 Sep 1949	25 years, 175 days	Kings Hall, Belfast, Northern Ireland, U.K.	For NBA, European, Lonsdale, and The Ring flyweight titles
57	Win	54–3	Norman Tennant	PTS	12	8 Jun 1949	25 years, 61 days	Dens Park, Dundee, Scotland, U.K.	
56	Win	53–3	Honore Pratesi	PTS	10	3 May 1949	25 years, 25 days	Earls Court Empress Hall, Kensington, London, England, U.K.	
55	Win	52–3	Jackie Foster	PTS	8	3 Mar 1949	24 years, 329 days	Caledonian Road Baths, Islington, London, England, U.K.	
54	Win	51–3	Rinty Monaghan	PTS	8	7 Feb 1949	24 years, 274 days	Harringay Arena, Harringay, London, England, U.K.	
53	Win	50–3	Dickie O'Sullivan	PTS	12	24 Jan 1949	24 years, 291 days	Royal Albert Hall, Kensington, London, England, U.K.	
52	Win	49–3	Billy Hazelgrove	PTS	8	10 Jan 1949	24 years, 277 days	Manor Place Baths, Walworth, London, England, U.K.	
51	Win	48–3	Tommy Farricker	PTS	8	14 Dec 1948	24 years, 250 days	Prince of Wales Baths, Kentish Town, London, England, U.K.	
50	Win	47–3	Charley Wilson	PTS	8	4 Nov 1948	24 years, 210 days	Caledonian Road Baths, Islington, London, England, U.K.	
49	Loss	46–3	Jackie Bryce	PTS	12	25 Jun 1948	24 years, 78 days	Greyhound Stadium, Coatbridge, Scotland, U.K.	
48	Win	46–2	Dickie O'Sullivan	DQ	2 (12)	16 Mar 1948	23 years, 343 days	Harringay Arena, Harringay, London, England, U.K.	Won vacant British (South East Area) flyweight title; O'Sullivan DQ'd for a low blow
47	Win	45–2	Jimmy Gill	KO	4 (8)	18 Feb 1948	23 years, 306 days	Caledonian Road Baths, Islington, London, England, U.K.	
46	Win	44–2	Jackie Bryce	PTS	8	21 Jan 1948	24 years, 251 days	Caledonian Road Baths, Islington, London, England, U.K.	
45	Win	43–2	Tommy Whittle	TKO	3 (8)	15 Dec 1947	23 years, 251 days	Kentish Town, London, England, U.K.	
44	Win	42–2	Frank Tierney	PTS	8	12 Nov 1947	23 years, 218 days	Caledonian Road Baths, Islington, London, England, U.K.	
43	Win	41–2	Les Johnson	PTS	8	3 Nov 1947	23 years, 209 days	Kentish Town, London, England, U.K.	
42	Win	40–2	Andy McCulloch	TKO	5 (8)	15 Oct 1947	23 years, 190 days	Caledonian Road Baths, Islington, London, England, U.K.	
41	Win	39–2	Johnny Summers	PTS	8	26 Aug 1947	23 years, 140 days	Wembley Town Hall, Wembley, London, England, U.K.	
40	Win	38–2	Alf Hughes	PTS	8	7 Jul 1947	23 years, 90 days	Engineer's Club, West Hartlepool, County Durham, England, U.K.	
39	Win	37–2	Pinchie Thompson	PTS	8	17 Jun 1947	23 years, 70 days	Drill Hall, Willesden, London, England, U.K.	
38	Loss	36–2	Rinty Monaghan	TKO	1 (10)	11 Mar 1947	23 years, 254 days	Seymour Hall, Marylebone, London, England, U.K.	
37	Win	36–1	Billy Hazelgrove	PTS	8	18 Dec 1946	22 years, 254 days	Caledonian Road Baths, Islington, London, England, U.K.	
36	Win	35–1	Billy Davies	TKO	4 (8)	4 Dec 1946	22 years, 240 days	Lime Grove Baths, Shepherd's Bush, London, England, U.K.	
35	Win	34–1	Frank Tierney	PTS	8	30 Oct 1946	22 years, 205 days	Hampden Park, Glasgow, Scotland, U.K.	
34	Win	33–1	Les Johnson	PTS	8	13 Aug 1946	22 years, 127 days	Wembley Town Hall, Wembley, London, England, U.K.	
33	Loss	32–1	Alex Murphy	KO	6 (6)	14 May 1946	22 years, 36 days	Harringay Arena, Harringay, London, England, U.K.	
32	Win	32–0	Abdel Hassan	KO	3 (8)	13 Dec 1945	21 years, 249 days	Alexandria, Egypt	
31	Win	31–0	Hocine Rabah	KO	1 (8)	8 Nov 1945	21 years, 214 days	Alexandria, Egypt	
30	Win	30–0	Sayed Mustapha	KO	2 (8)	12 Oct 1945	21 years, 187 days	Alexandria, Egypt	
29	Win	29–0	Mustapha Ezzatt	PTS	10	6 Oct 1945	21 years, 181 days	Municipal Stadium, Alexandria, Egypt	
28	Win	28–0	Abdel Hassan	KO	6 (8)	16 Jul 1945	21 years, 99 days	Municipal Stadium, Alexandria, Egypt	
27	Win	27–0	Mustapha Ezzatt	PTS	6	24 May 1945	21 years, 46 days	Alexandria, Egypt	
26	Win	26–0	Mustapha Ezzatt	PTS	6	28 Apr 1945	21 years, 20 days	Alexandria, Egypt	
25	Win	25–0	Phil Milligan	PTS	6	8 Mar 1945	20 years, 334 days	Alexandria, Egypt	
24	Win	24–0	Sapper Johnstone	PTS	6	3 Mar 1945	20 years, 329 days	Alexandria, Egypt	
23	Win	23–0	Hassan Abou Saada	PTS	6	4 Feb 1945	20 years, 302 days	Alexandria, Egypt	
22	Win	22–0	Christie Kyrisco	PTS	6	4 Jan 1945	20 years, 271 days	Alexandria, Egypt	
21	Win	21–0	Chehata Hafez	KO	3 (6)	23 Dec 1944	20 years, 259 days	Alexandria, Egypt	
20	Win	20–0	Hassan Ramadin	PTS	4	10 Dec 1944	20 years, 246 days	Alexandria, Egypt	
19	Win	19–0	Ahmed Marly	KO	1 (4)	8 Jul 1944	20 years, 91 days	Alexandria, Egypt	
18	Win	18–0	Georges Shamar	PTS	4	10 May 1944	20 years, 32 days	Alexandria, Egypt	
17	Win	17–0	Mickey Jones	PTS	10	2 May 1944	20 years, 24 days	Victoria Hall, Southend, Essex, England, U.K.	
16	Win	16–0	Roy Ball	RTD	4 (10)	21 Apr 1944	20 years, 13 days	Tower Circus, Blackpool, Lancashire, England, U.K.	
15	Win	15–0	Tommy Burney	PTS	10	6 Apr 1944	19 years, 364 days	The Stadium, Liverpool, Merseyside, England, U.K.	
14	Win	14–0	Joe Josephs	KO	4 (10)	17 Mar 1944	19 years, 344 days	Town Hall, Hornsey, London, England, U.K.	
13	Win	13–0	Joe Josephs	TKO	4 (8)	1 Feb 1944	19 years, 299 days	Town Hall, Hornsey, London, England, U.K.	
12	Win	12–0	Jackie Evans	PTS	8	13 Jan 1944	19 years, 280 days	The Stadium, Liverpool, Merseyside, England, U.K.	
11	Win	11–0	Billy Hazelgrove	RTD	9 (10)	31 Dec 1943	19 years, 267 days	Tower Circus, Blackpool, Lancashire, England, U.K.	
10	Win	10–0	Mickey Jones	PTS	8	29 Nov 1943	19 years, 235 days	Pype Hayes, Birmingham, West Midlands, England, U.K.	
9	Win	9–0	Jack McKenzie	PTS	10	19 Nov 1943	19 years, 225 days	Tower Circus, Blackpool, Lancashire, England, U.K.	
8	Win	8–0	Roy Ball	PTS	8	4 Nov 1943	19 years, 210 days	The Stadium, Liverpool, Merseyside, England, U.K.	
7	Win	7–0	Ronnie Bishop	PTS	8	30 Sep 1943	19 years, 175 days	The Stadium, Liverpool, Merseyside, England, U.K.	
6	Win	6–0	Tommy Burney	PTS	8	9 Sep 1943	19 years, 154 days	The Stadium, Liverpool, Merseyside, England, U.K.	
5	Win	5–0	Les Johnson	PTS	6	10 May 1943	19 years, 32 days	Caledonian Road Baths, Islington, London, England, U.K.	
4	Win	4–0	George Howell	KO	1 (6)	7 Apr 1943	18 years, 364 days	Drill Hall, York, Yorkshire, England, U.K.	
3	Win	3–0	Ron Kingston	KO	4 (6)	19 Mar 1943	18 years, 345 days	Pype Hayes, Birmingham, West Midlands, England, U.K.	
2	Win	2–0	Douglas Claxton	TKO	4 (6)	8 Mar 1943	18 years, 334 days	Caledonian Road Baths, Islington, London, England, U.K.	
1	Win	1–0	Jim Thomas	PTS	6	3 Sep 1942	18 years, 148 days	Caledonian Road Baths, Islington, London, England, U.K.	

== See also ==
- List of flyweight boxing champions
- List of British flyweight boxing champions

Achievements
Preceded by Rinty Monaghan	World flyweight champion 25 April 1950 – 1 August 1950	Succeeded by Dado Marino
