= Martin Young (footballer) =

English footballer

Personal information
- Full name: Martin Young
- Date of birth: 9 April 1955 (age 71)
- Place of birth: Grimsby, England
- Position: Defender

Senior career*
Years	Team	Apps	(Gls)
1974–1979	Grimsby Town	94	(4)
- * Club domestic league appearances and goals

Martin Young (born 9 April 1955) is an English former professional footballer who played as a defender.
