= Hogan Bassey =

Nigerian boxer (1932–1998)

Hogan Bassey MBE MON
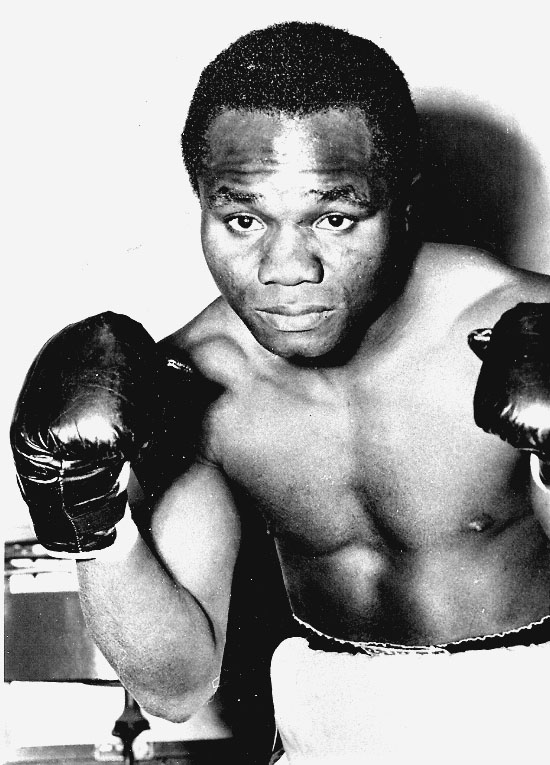
- Born: 27 April 1932; Cross River, Creek Town, Calabar, Nigeria
- Died: 26 January 1998 (aged 65); Apapa, Lagos, Nigeria

Hogan "Kid" Bassey MBE MON (3 June 1932 – 26 January 1998) was a Nigerian-British boxer; he was the first man of Nigerian descent to become a world boxing champion. and held undisputed at featherweight in 1957.

He was born Okon Asuquo Bassey on the banks of the Cross River Creek Town, Calabar, Nigeria, and became naturalised British when he moved to the UK, where he spent most of his life in Liverpool. He took the name Kid Bassey when he turned professional as a boxer. He was managed and trained by Peter Banasko from Liverpool. After winning the British Empire Featherweight title George Biddles bought out Bassey's Contract for £600 which was a big risk at the time. He was then managed and trained by Biddles and Jimmy August.

== Boxing career ==
After 14 contests in Nigeria, Bassey went to Liverpool, England, arriving there three days before Christmas 1951.

After winning the Empire featherweight championship, he won the WBA world featherweight title by defeating French Algerian Cherif Hamia in Paris on 24 June 1957. He lost the title to US fighter Davey Moore on 18 March 1959. Other opponents include Billy "Spider" Kelly, Percy Lewis, Tommy Profitt, Sammy McCarthy, Ricardo Moreno, and Willie Pep.

== Life after boxing ==
In the 1958 New Year Honours, he was appointed a Member of the Order of the British Empire (MBE) "for services to sport in the Eastern Region, Nigeria". Bassey went on to become a coach in Nigeria, which awarded him the country's highest honour, the Order of the Niger, in 1973. He died on 26 January 1998 at his home in Apapa, Lagos.

== Professional boxing record ==
59 Wins (21 knockouts, 38 decisions), 13 Losses (4 knockouts, 9 decisions), 2 Draws
Result	Record	Opponent	Type	Round	Date	Location	Notes
Loss	68–13–4	(United States) Davey Moore	RTD	11 (15)	19 August 1959	(California) Los Angeles, United States	For NYSAC, NBA, and The Ring featherweight titles
Loss	68–12–4	(United States) Davey Moore	RTD	13 (15)	18 March 1959	(California) Los Angeles, United States	Lost NYSAC, NBA, and The Ring featherweight titles
Win	68–11–4	(Mexico) Ernesto Parra	UD	10	13 December 1958	(California) Hollywood, United States	
Win	67–11–4	(United States) Carmelo Costa	UD	10	31 October 1958	(New York (state)) New York City, United States	
Win	66–11–4	(United States) Willie Pep	TKO	9	20 September 1958	Boston, Massachusetts, United States	
Win	65–11–4	(Ivory Coast) Jules Touan	TKO	7	24 June 1958	Kensington, London, United Kingdom	
Win	64–11–4	(Mexico) Ricardo Moreno	KO	3 (15)	1 April 1958	(California) Los Angeles, United States	Retained NYSAC, NBA, and The Ring featherweight titles
Win	63–11–4	(Belgium) Jean Pierre Cossemyns	PTS	10	23 January 1958	Liverpool, Merseyside, United Kingdom	
Win	62–11–4	(France) Victor Pepeder	PTS	10	7 October 1957	Nottingham, Nottinghamshire, United Kingdom	
Win	61–11–4	(France) Cherif Hamia	TKO	10 (15)	24 June 1957	Paris, France	Won vacant NYSAC, NBA, and The Ring featherweight titles
Win	60–11–4	(Puerto Rico) Miguel Berrios	UD	12	26 April 1957	Washington, District of Columbia, United States	featherweight title eliminator
Win	59–11–4	(Trinidad and Tobago) Percy Lewis	PTS	15	1 April 1957	Nottingham, Nottinghamshire, United Kingdom	Retained Commonwealth featherweight title
Win	58–11–4	(Brazil) Joao Dos Santos	PTS	10	26 November 1956	Leicester, East Midlands, United Kingdom	
Loss	57–11–4	(Belgium) Jean Sneyers	TKO	4	26 November 1956	Liège, Belgium	
Win	57–10–4	(South Africa) Alby Tissong	PTS	8	6 September 1956	Liverpool, Merseyside, United Kingdom	
Win	56–10–4	(Italy) Aldo Pravisani	PTS	8	3 May 1956	Liverpool, Merseyside, United Kingdom	
Win	55–10–4	(Belgium) Louis Cabo	TKO	4	22 March 1956	Liverpool, Merseyside, United Kingdom	
Win	54–10–4	(Belgium) Jean Sneyers	TKO	4	7 February 1956	Harringay, London, United Kingdom	
Win	53–10–4	(Northern Ireland) Billy Kelly	KO	8	19 November 1955	Belfast, Northern Ireland, United Kingdom	Commonwealth Featherweight Title.
Win	52–10–4	(Brazil) Joe Quinn	KO	1	8 October 1955	Belfast, Northern Ireland, United Kingdom	
Win	51–10–4	(Spain) Juan Oscar Alvarez	PTS	10	25 August 1955	Liverpool, Merseyside, United Kingdom	
Win	50–10–4	(France) Andre Pierson	PTS	10	3 June 1955	Manchester, United Kingdom	
Win	49–10–4	(France) Marcel Ranvial	KO	5	22 March 1955	Kensington, London, United Kingdom	
Win	48–10–4	(Trinidad and Tobago) Percy Lewis	PTS	8	31 January 1955	Nottingham, Nottinghamshire, United Kingdom	
Win	47–10–4	(Belgium) Aime Devisch	PTS	10	29 November 1954	Leeds, Yorkshire, United Kingdom	
Win	46–10–4	(United Kingdom) Harry Ramsden	PTS	8	27 October 1954	Blackpool, Lancashire, United Kingdom	
Win	45–10–4	(Spain) Luis Romero	PTS	10	3 September 1954	Manchester, United Kingdom	
Loss	44–10–4	(Belgium) Jo Woussem	PTS	8	12 August 1954	Liverpool, Merseyside, United Kingdom	
Win	44–9–4	(France) Jacques Legendre	PTS	10	2 July 1954	Manchester, United Kingdom	
Win	43–9–4	(Italy) Enrico Macale	PTS	8	3 June 1954	Liverpool, Merseyside, United Kingdom	
Win	42–9–4	(Belgium) Jean Sneyers	PTS	10	29 April 1954	Liverpool, Merseyside, United Kingdom	
Win	41–9–4	(United Kingdom) Johnny Butterworth	PTS	10	4 March 1954	Liverpool, Merseyside, United Kingdom	
Loss	40–9–4	(United Kingdom) Billy Kelly	PTS	8	8 December 1953	Harringay, London, United Kingdom	
Win	40–8–4	(United Kingdom) Sammy McCarthy	PTS	10	6 October 1953	Kensington, London, United Kingdom	
Loss	39–8–4	(Spain) Juan Oscar Alvarez	PTS	10	7 September 1953	Newcastle, Tyne and Wear, United Kingdom	
Win	39–7–4	(United Kingdom) Tommy Higgins	PTS	8	27 August 1953	Liverpool, Merseyside, United Kingdom	
Win	38–7–4	(United Kingdom) Denny Dawson	KO	4	9 July 1953	Liverpool, Merseyside, United Kingdom	
Loss	37–7–4	(France) Emile Chemama	TKO	5	24 March 1953	Kensington, London, United Kingdom	
Win	37–6–4	(Spain) Luis Romero	TKO	8	27 February 1953	Manchester, United Kingdom	
Loss	36–6–4	(United Kingdom) Johnny Haywood	DQ	3	30 January 1953	Blackpool, Lancashire, United Kingdom	
Win	36–5–4	(United Kingdom) Ken Lawrence	TKO	5	20 January 1953	Kensington, London, United Kingdom	
Win	35–5–4	(United Kingdom) Jackie Briers	PTS	10	8 January 1953	Liverpool, Merseyside, United Kingdom	
Win	34–5–4	(United Kingdom) Bobby Boland	TKO	5	15 December 1952	Manchester, United Kingdom	
Loss	33–5–4	(Belgium) Jean Pierre Cossemyns	PTS	10	8 December 1952	Leeds, Yorkshire, United Kingdom	
Win	33–4–4	(United Kingdom) Tommy Proffitt	TKO	7	14 November 1952	Manchester, United Kingdom	
Win	32–4–4	(United Kingdom) Tommy Proffitt	PTS	8	27 October 1952	Manchester, United Kingdom	
Win	31–4–4	(United Kingdom) Eddie Carson	PTS	8	9 October 1952	Liverpool, Merseyside, United Kingdom	
Win	30–4–4	(United Kingdom) Eddie McCormick	PTS	8	22 September 1952	Manchester, United Kingdom	
Win	29–4–4	(United Kingdom) Stan Skinless	TKO	7	11 September 1952	Liverpool, Merseyside, United Kingdom	
Win	28–4–4	(United Kingdom) Tommy Higgins	PTS	8	28 August 1952	Liverpool, Merseyside, United Kingdom	
Win	27–4–4	(United Kingdom) Jimmy Cardew	PTS	8	7 August 1952	Liverpool, Merseyside, United Kingdom	
Win	26–4–4	(United Kingdom) Johnny Barclay	KO	6	28 July 1952	West Hartlepool, County Durham, United Kingdom	
Win	25–4–4	(United Kingdom) Ivor Davies	KO	2	23 June 1952	West Hartlepool, County Durham, United Kingdom	
Loss	24–4–4	(United Kingdom) Frankie Williams	PTS	8	15 May 1952	Liverpool, Merseyside, United Kingdom	
Loss	24–3–4	(United Kingdom) John Kelly	PTS	8	26 April 1952	Belfast, Northern Ireland, United Kingdom	
Win	24–2–4	(United Kingdom) Bobby Boland	KO	5	17 April 1952	Liverpool, Merseyside, United Kingdom	
Draw	23–2–4	(United Kingdom) Glyn Evans	PTS	8	1 April 1952	Hanley, Staffordshire, United Kingdom	
Win	23–2–3	(United Kingdom) Len Shaw	PTS	8	24 March 1952	Preston, Lancashire, United Kingdom	
Win	22–2–3	(United Kingdom) Tommy Higgins	PTS	8	5 March 1952	Blackpool, Lancashire, United Kingdom	
Win	21–2–3	(United Kingdom) Peter Fay	PTS	8	19 February 1952	Hanley, Staffordshire, United Kingdom	
Win	20–2–3	(United Kingdom) Ray Hillyard	TKO	4	31 January 1952	Liverpool, Merseyside, United Kingdom	
Win	19–2–3	(Gold Coast (British colony)) Young Spider Neequaye	PTS	12	28 September 1951	Lagos, Nigeria	West African Bantamweight Title
Win	18–2–3	(Nigeria) Steve Jeffra	PTS	12	29 August 1951	Lagos, Nigeria	Nigerian Bantamweight Title
Draw	17–2–3	(Ghana) Little Joe	PTS	10	8 Jul 1951	(Nigeria) Emmy Cinema Theatre, Aba	
Win	17–2–2	(Ghana) Adjetey Sowah	PTS	10	30 May 1951	Lagos, Nigeria	
Win	16–2–2	(Nigeria) Jack Salami	PTS	8	16 May 1951	Lagos, Nigeria	
Win	15–2–2	Kid Chukudi	TKO	3	4 May 1951	Lagos, Nigeria	
Win	14–2–2	(Nigeria) Dick Turpin	PTS	6	29 January 1951	Lagos, Nigeria	
Win	13–2–2	(Nigeria) Joe Bennett	TKO	10 (12)	10 Nov 1950	Lagos, Nigeria	Nigerian Bantamweight Title
Win	12–2–2	(Nigeria) Eddie Phillips	PTS	6	6 Oct 1950	Lagos, Nigeria	
Win	11–2–2	(Nigeria) Steve Jeffra	PTS	12	7 July 1950	Lagos, Nigeria	
Draw	10–2–2	(Ghana) Ogli Tettey	PTS	12	31 May 1950	Lagos, Nigeria	West African Flyweight Title
Loss	10–2–1	(Nigeria) Bola Lawal	TKO	5 (6)	1 Mar 1950	(Nigeria) Glover Memorial Hall, Lagos	
Win	10–1–1	(Nigeria) Bob Emmanuel	TKO	4 (12)	26 Dec 1949	(Nigeria) Railway Stadium, Lagos	Nigerian Flyweight Title
Loss	9–1–1	(Nigeria) Dick Turpin	DQ	5 (12)	28 Nov 1949	Lagos, Nigeria	Nigerian Flyweight Title
Win	9–0–1	(Nigeria) Texas Kid	PTS	10	26 October 1949	(Nigeria) Glover Memorial Hall, Lagos	Nigerian Flyweight Title
Win	8–0–1	(Nigeria) Dick Turpin	PTS	12	27 July 1949	Lagos, Nigeria	Nigerian Flyweight Title
Win	7–0–1	(Nigeria) Jack Sala	TKO	4 (6))	27 Jul 1949	(Nigeria) Royal Hotel, Lagos	
Win	6–0–1	(Ghana) Ogli Tettey	PTS	12	28 Mar 1949	(Nigeria) Glover Memorial Hall, Lagos	
Win	5–0–1	(Nigeria) Jack Sala	TKO	4 (6)	31 January 1949	(Nigeria) African Tennis Club, Lagos	
Win	4–0–1	(Nigeria) Hurry Kid	KO	4 (6)	30 December 1948	(Nigeria) Lagos	
Win	3–0–1	(Nigeria) Hurry Kid	PTS	6	29 November 1948	(Nigeria) Lagos	
Draw	2–0–1	(Nigeria) Bolo Lawal	PTS	6	26 May 1948	(Nigeria) Glover Memorial Hall, Lagos	
Win	2–0	(Nigeria) Jack Sala	PTS	6	6 February 1948	(Nigeria) Lagos	
Win	1–0	(Nigeria) Jimmy Brown	PTS	6	28 November 1947	(Nigeria) African Tennis Club, Lagos	

== Titles in boxing ==
=== Major world titles ===
- NYSAC featherweight champion (126 lbs)
- NBA (WBA) featherweight champion (126 lbs)

=== The Ring magazine titles ===
- The Ring featherweight champion (126 lbs)

=== Regional/International titles ===
- Nigerian flyweight champion (112 lbs)
- Nigerian bantamweight champion (118 lbs)
- West African bantamweight champion (118 lbs)
- Commonwealth featherweight champion (126 lbs)

=== Undisputed titles ===
- Undisputed featherweight champion

== See also ==
- Lineal championship

Vacant Title last held by Sandy Saddler	World Featherweight Champion; 24 June 1957 – 18 March 1959	Succeeded by Davey Moore
