= Sammy McCarthy =

British boxer (1931–2020)

Personal information
- Nationality: British
- Born: 5 September 1931 Stepney, London, England
- Died: 10 February 2020 (aged 88)
- Weight: Featherweight; Lightweight

Boxing career

Boxing record
- Total fights: 53
- Wins: 44
- Win by KO: 26
- Losses: 8
- Draws: 1

Sammy McCarthy (5 November 1931 – 10 February 2020) was a British professional boxer who was the featherweight champion between 1954 and 1955. He also fought for the British lightweight title and the European and British Empire featherweight titles.

== Career ==
Born one of ten children in Stepney, London to a costermonger father, McCarthy was a boyhood friend of Terry Lawless, and had a successful amateur career fighting out of St. George's Gym in Stepney, winning 83 of 90 fights and representing England four times.

He turned professional under managers Jarvis Astaire and Ben Schmidt, and made his pro debut in April 1951 with a first round knockout of Hector Macrow. He was unbeaten in his first 28 fights, which included wins over Freddie King, Jackie Turpin, Ronnie Clayton, and Jim Kenny. In December 1952 he was chosen as the best young fighter of the year by the Boxing Writers Club. He suffered his first defeat in October 1953 when he was beaten on points at the Royal Albert Hall by future World champion Hogan "Kid" Bassey. He also lost his next fight, to former European champion Ray Famechon, before challenging for the European title himself when he faced Jean Sneyers at the Harringay Arena in February 1954. Sneyers won on points to retain the title.

McCarthy beat Teddy Peckham in April before challenging for the British title that Clayton had held for almost 7 years in June 1954 at White City Stadium. Clayton retired at the end of the eighth round due to impaired vision, giving McCarthy the title, and Clayton was forced to retire from boxing after the fight due to his injuries. McCarthy won four more fights that year, the last a points victory over Roy Ankrah in December. In January 1955 he made his first defence of the British title against Billy "Spider" Kelly, with Kelly's British Empire title also at stake. The fight went the full 15 rounds, with Kelly winning on points.

McCarthy was offered a rematch with Kelly, but after failing to make featherweight against Sneyers in November 1955 decided to move up to lightweight, winning his first fight at the weight against Austrian champion Willi Swoboda. Despite losing to Dave Charnley in April 1956, he faced Joe Lucy in June for the British title. The referee stopped the fight in the thirteenth round with Lucy well ahead on points. McCarthy beat Midlands Area champion Johnny Mann twice that year and also beat Johnny Miller and Jacques Dumesnil, but in January 1957 lost on points in what proved to be his final fight, against Guy Gracia.

In 1957 he was featured on This Is Your Life, the first boxer to be the subject of the programme, and at 25 the youngest subject. He subsequently ran the Prince of Wales pub and went into boxing management, working with boxers such as Terry Spinks and Bobby Day. He later turned to crime and served three prison sentences (3, 6 and 14 years) for armed robbery of banks before living in retirement in Wanstead. He died on 11 February 2020, aged 88.
