= Roy Ankrah =

Ghanaian boxer

Personal information
- Nicknames: The Black Flash; Mr. Perpetual Motion
- Nationality: Ghanaian
- Born: John Theophilus Oti Ankrah; 25 December 1925 Ghana
- Died: 28 May 1995 (aged 69)
- Weight: Bantamweight; Featherweight; Super-featherweight

Boxing career

Boxing record
- Total fights: 44
- Wins: 34
- Win by KO: 14
- Losses: 7
- No contests: 3

John Theophilus Oti Ankrah (25 December 1925 – 28 May 1995), better known as Roy Ankrah, was a Ghanaian featherweight boxing contender during the 1950s. He was given the nicknames "The Black Flash" and "Mr. Perpetual Motion" because of his fast hands and crafty footwork. Ankrah held the Commonwealth featherweight title from 1951 to 1952 and had his biggest fight against then-reigning NBA, NYSAC, and The Ring bantamweight world champion in a non-title fight as both fighters weighed above the 118-pound (54 kg) limit for a bantamweight fighter.

== Early life ==
According to some sources, Roy Ankrah was born in Jamestown, Ghana in 1923; however other sources have listed him as being born in 1925. His aunt raised Ankrah after the death of his mother. He soon became known as a street fighter and won the regional school championship at the age of 12. By this time, Ankrah was already working as a mechanic in his uncle's auto repair shop. He won his first professional fight at the age of 17.

== Career ==
After winning the national featherweight title in 1941, he joined the army. During his time with the Armed Forces, he was sent to India during World War II, where he is said to have participated in numerous exhibition fights and championships. After his return from India, the Ghanaian fighter began training for the national featherweight title once again. During this time, he defeated Nigerian stoker Kid Parry, claiming the title of West African champion. He is said to have kept this undefeated status until he moved to the British Isles.

According to reports, Ankrah switched to the professional camp on the Gold Coast in 1941. He was undefeated throughout his 110 fights until 1949. During this period, he became the national champion in five different weight classes; flyweight, bantamweight, featherweight, lightweight and welterweight. Following a suggestion by his fellow fighter Freddie Mills, Ankrah made his debut as the first Ghanaian to fight overseas. On February 8, 1950, he joined George Lamont in the ring in Paisley, Scotland. He went on record as having 10 further wins before eventually losing to Jimmy Murray on a foul on May 30, 1950. On April 30, 1951, Ankrah won the Commonwealth featherweight title against Ronnie Clayton. He maintained this title until October 2, 1954, when he lost to Billy Kelly. Shortly thereafter, Ankrah took a break and stopped competing in the British Isles. However, in 1959, he traveled back to his native Ghana, where he competed in three more professional fights, losing two. He later supported the Ghanaian National Team in preparation for the Commonwealth and Olympic Games. He assisted the British trainer Jack Roy at the 1960 Olympic Games when Clement Quartey won the first Olympic medal for the former British colony. After these games, Ankrah was promoted to National Coach and worked directly with the National Sports Council until 1994, in addition to being a judge for the World Boxing Council (WBC).

== Professional boxing record ==
44 fights	34 wins	7 losses
By knockout	14	1
By decision	19	5
By disqualification	1	1
No contests	3	

No.	Result	Record	Opponent	Type	Round	Date	Location	Notes
44	Win	34–7 (3)	(Ghana) Ray Akwei	PTS	6	Jun 6, 1959	Tarkwa, Ghana	
43	Loss	33–7 (3)	(Ghana) Jomo Jackson	PTS	6	Jun 2, 1959	Accra, Ghana	
42	Win	33–6 (3)	(Ghana) Ray Akwei	PTS	8	Apr 11, 1959	Tema, Ghana	
41	Loss	32–6 (3)	(France) Robert Cohen	TKO	4 (10)	Dec 20, 1954	Palais des Sports, Paris, Paris, France	
40	Loss	32–5 (3)	(United Kingdom) Sammy McCarthy	PTS	10	Dec 7, 1954	(United Kingdom) Harringay Arena, Harringay, London, England, U.K.	
39	Loss	32–4 (3)	(United Kingdom) Billy Kelly	PTS	15	Oct 2, 1954	(United Kingdom) Kings Hall, Belfast, Northern Ireland, U.K.	Lost British Empire featherweight title
38	Win	32–3 (3)	(United Kingdom) Billy Kelly	PTS	10	Apr 10, 1954	(United Kingdom) Kings Hall, Belfast, Northern Ireland, U.K.	
37	Win	31–3 (3)	(Spain) Juan Oscar Álvarez	PTS	10	Oct 6, 1953	(United Kingdom) Royal Albert Hall, Kensington, London, England, U.K.	
36	NC	30–3 (3)	(Spain) Manolo Garcia	NC	10 (10)	Sep 30, 1953	(United Kingdom) Plaza de Toros de Las Ventas, Madrid, Comunidad de Madrid, Spain	The bout was stopped in the final round because of lack of combativeness
35	Win	30–3 (2)	(Italy) Amleto Falcinelli	PTS	10	Aug 26, 1953	(United Kingdom) Coney Beach Arena, Porthcawl, Wales, U.K.	
34	Win	29–3 (2)	(Spain) José Hernández	PTS	10	Aug 19, 1953	Pabellón del Deporte, Barcelona, Cataluña, Spain	
33	Win	28–3 (2)	(France) Jacques Dumesnil	PTS	10	Jun 17, 1953	(United Kingdom) Firhill Park, Glasgow, Scotland, U.K.	
32	Win	27–3 (2)	(Spain) Juan Oscar Álvarez	PTS	10	May 18, 1953	(United Kingdom) Embassy Rink, Birmingham, West Midlands, England, U.K.	
31	NC	26–3 (2)	(France) Mohammed Chickaoui	NC	7 (10)	May 11, 1953	(United Kingdom) Ice Rink, Nottingham, Nottinghamshire, England, U.K.	
30	Win	26–3 (1)	(Ghana) Benny Kid Chocolate	TKO	2 (10)	Jan 12, 1953	(United Kingdom) New St James Hall, Newcastle, Tyne and Wear, England, U.K.	
29	Win	25–3 (1)	(Spain) Jesús Aguirre	PTS	10	Dec 19, 1952	Gran Price, Barcelona, Cataluña, Spain	
28	Loss	24–3 (1)	(Spain) Luis Romero	PTS	10	Nov 9, 1952	Plaza de Toros de Las Ventas, Madrid, Comunidad de Madrid, Spain	
27	Loss	24–2 (1)	(France) Ray Famechon	PTS	15	Jun 9, 1952	(United Kingdom) Ice Rink, Nottingham, Nottinghamshire, England, U.K.	
26	Win	24–1 (1)	(Morocco) Boudjema Ali Ramdane	PTS	10	Apr 22, 1952	(United Kingdom) Harringay Arena, Harringay, London, England, U.K.	
25	Win	23–1 (1)	(United Kingdom) Ronnie Clayton	RTD	13 (15)	Feb 25, 1952	(United Kingdom) Ice Rink, Nottingham, Nottinghamshire, England, U.K.	Retained British Empire featherweight title
24	Win	22–1 (1)	(United Kingdom) Bernard Pugh	RTD	6 (10)	Dec 17, 1951	(United Kingdom) Ice Rink, Nottingham, Nottinghamshire, England, U.K.	
23	Win	21–1 (1)	(United Kingdom) Tommy McGovern	PTS	10	Nov 6, 1951	(United Kingdom) Earls Court Empress Hall, Kensington, London, England, U.K.	
22	Win	20–1 (1)	(Italy) Alvaro Cerasani	DQ	2 (10)	Oct 23, 1951	(United Kingdom) Royal Albert Hall, Kensington, London, England, U.K.	Cerasani, already down twice, was disqualified for going down without a punch
21	Win	19–1 (1)	(Belgium) Jean Machterlinck	TKO	5 (10)	Sep 19, 1951	(United Kingdom) Ice Rink, Paisley, Scotland, U.K.	
20	Win	18–1 (1)	(United Kingdom) Ronnie Clayton	PTS	15	Apr 30, 1951	(United Kingdom) Earls Court Empress Hall, Kensington, London, England, U.K.	Won British Empire featherweight title
19	Win	17–1 (1)	(United Kingdom) Johnny Molloy	RTD	4 (8)	Apr 3, 1951	(United Kingdom) Earls Court Empress Hall, Kensington, London, England, U.K.	
18	Win	16–1 (1)	(United Kingdom) Bernard Pugh	PTS	8	Mar 28, 1951	(United Kingdom) Ice Rink, Paisley, Scotland, U.K.	
17	ND	15–1 (1)	(Nigeria) Speedy Twitch	ND	?	Feb 12, 1951	Lagos, Nigeria	
16	Win	15–1	(South Africa) Speedy Bandes	PTS	12	Jan 29, 1951	City Hall, Durban, KwaZulu-Natal, South Africa	
15	Win	14–1	(South Africa) Tony Lombard	RTD	8 (10)	Nov 7, 1950	(United Kingdom) Earls Court Empress Hall, Kensington, London, England, U.K.	
14	Win	13–1	(United Kingdom) Bernard Pugh	PTS	10	Sep 19, 1950	(United Kingdom) Earls Court Empress Hall, Kensington, London, England, U.K.	
13	Win	12–1	(Spain) Luis Romero	TKO	5 (10)	Jul 29, 1950	Stadium Metropolitano, Madrid, Comunidad de Madrid, Spain	
12	Win	11–1	(United Kingdom) Tommy Bailey	PTS	10	Jul 27, 1950	(United Kingdom) The Stadium, Liverpool, Merseyside, England, U.K.	
11	Loss	10–1	(Republic of Ireland) Jimmy Murray	DQ	3 (8)	May 30, 1950	(United Kingdom) Streatham Ice Rink, Streatham, London, England, U.K.	Ankrah struck his Murray after while he was down
10	Win	10–0	(Spain) Francisco Latorre	TKO	2 (8)	May 23, 1950	(United Kingdom) Earls Court Empress Hall, Kensington, London, England, U.K.	
9	Win	9–0	(United Kingdom) Gene Caffrey	KO	5 (8)	Apr 20, 1950	(United Kingdom) Edinburgh National Sporting Club, Leith, Scotland, U.K.	
8	Win	8–0	(United Kingdom) Jim McCann	PTS	8	Apr 10, 1950	(United Kingdom) Royal Hippodrome, Belfast, Northern Ireland, U.K.	
7	Win	7–0	(United Kingdom) Denny Dennis	RTD	3 (8)	Apr 8, 1950	(United Kingdom) Ulster Hall, Belfast, Northern Ireland, U.K.	
6	Win	6–0	(Republic of Ireland) Danny Nagle	KO	5 (8)	Apr 5, 1950	(United Kingdom) New Baths, Willenhall, West Midlands, England, U.K.	
5	Win	5–0	(United Kingdom) Joe King	RTD	3 (8)	Mar 18, 1950	(United Kingdom) Ulster Hall, Belfast, Northern Ireland, U.K.	
4	Win	4–0	(United Kingdom) Peter Morrison	TKO	5 (8)	Mar 10, 1950	(United Kingdom) Ice Rink, Falkirk, Scotland, U.K.	
3	Win	3–0	(United Kingdom) Len Shaw	TKO	4 (8)	Feb 28, 1950	(United Kingdom) Music Hall, Edinburgh, Scotland, U.K.	
2	Win	2–0	(Jamaica) Zeke Brown	PTS	6	Feb 14, 1950	(United Kingdom) Music Hall, Edinburgh, Scotland, U.K.	
1	Win	1–0	(United Kingdom) George Lamont	PTS	6	Feb 8, 1950	(United Kingdom) Ice Rink, Paisley, Scotland, U.K.	
