= Los Angeles Memorial Sports Arena =

Former arena in California, United States

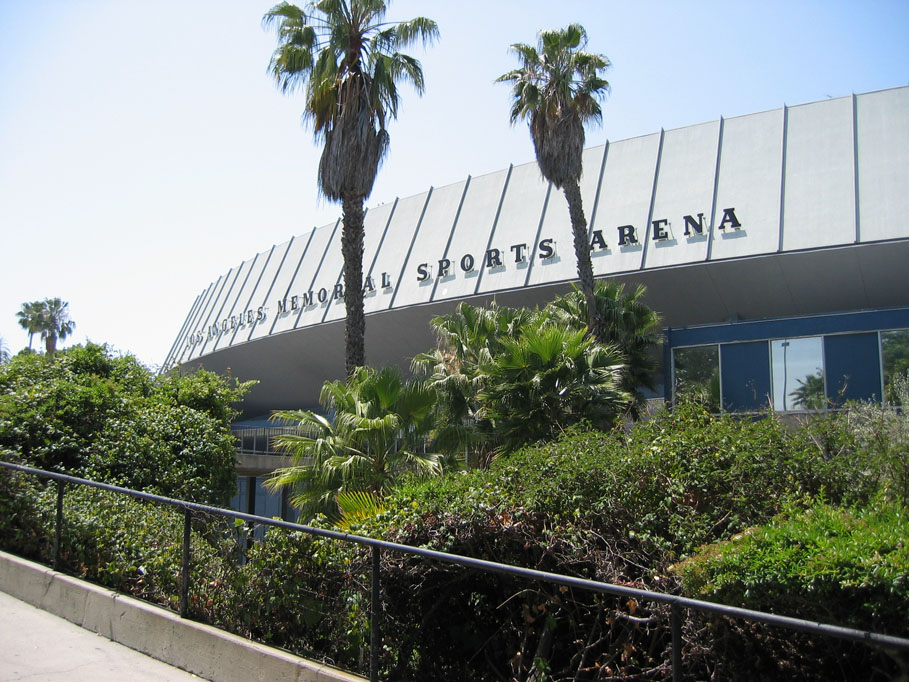
- The arena in April 2007

- Location in the Greater Los Angeles area Location in California Location in the United States Location in North America
- Interactive map of Los Angeles Memorial Sports Arena
- Location: 3939 South Figueroa Street; Los Angeles, California 90037
- Coordinates: 34.013°N 118.285°W
- Owner: State of California; County of Los Angeles; City of Los Angeles
- Operator: University of Southern California
- Capacity: Basketball: 16,161; Ice hockey: 14,546; Boxing/Wrestling: 16,740
- Scoreboard: American Sign & Indicator, now Trans-Lux; later Daktronics

Construction
- Groundbreaking: April 7, 1958; 68 years ago
- Opened: July 4, 1959; 67 years ago
- Closed: March 19, 2016; 10 years ago
- Demolished: September 2016; 10 years ago
- Cost: US$8.5 million ($93.9 million in 2025 dollars)
- Architect: Welton Becket
- Structural engineers: Brandow and Johnson
- General contractor: L.E. Dixon Company

Tenants
- USC Trojans men's basketball (NCAA) (1959–2006); UCLA Bruins men's basketball (NCAA) (1959–1965, 2011–2012); Los Angeles Jets (ABL) (1961–1962); Los Angeles Lakers (NBA) (1960–1967); Los Angeles Blades (WHL) (1961–1967); Los Angeles Kings (NHL) (1967); Los Angeles Stars (ABA) (1968–1970); Los Angeles Sharks (WHA) (1972–1974); Los Angeles Strings (WTT) (1974); Los Angeles Aztecs (NASL) (1980–1981); Los Angeles Clippers (NBA) (1984–1999); Los Angeles Cobras (AFL) (1988); Los Angeles Ice Dogs (IHL) (1995–1996); Los Angeles Temptation (LFL) (2009–2011)

The Los Angeles Memorial Sports Arena was a multi-purpose arena at Exposition Park, in the University Park neighborhood of Los Angeles. It was located next to the Los Angeles Memorial Coliseum and just south of the campus of the University of Southern California, which managed and operated both venues under a master lease agreement with the Los Angeles Memorial Coliseum Commission. The arena was closed in April 2016, and was demolished in September of that same year. It was replaced with BMO Stadium, home of Major League Soccer's Los Angeles FC, which opened in 2018.

== History ==
The arena was opened by Vice President Richard Nixon on July 4, 1959 and its first event followed four days later, a bantamweight title fight between José Becerra and Alphonse Halimi on July 8. It became a companion facility to the adjacent Los Angeles Memorial Coliseum.

The venue was the home court of the Los Angeles Lakers of the NBA from October 1960 to December 1967, the Los Angeles Clippers also of the NBA from 1984 to 1999, and the home ice of the Los Angeles Kings of the NHL from October to December 1967 during their inaugural 1967–68 season. It was the home for college basketball for the USC Trojans from 1959 to 2006 and the UCLA Bruins from 1959 to 1965 and again as a temporary home in the 2011–2012 season. It was also the home of the Professional Rodeo Cowboys Association's National Finals Rodeo from 1962 to 1964. It also hosted the Los Angeles Aztecs of the NASL who played one season of indoor soccer there (1980–81), the Los Angeles Blades of the Western Hockey League from 1961 to 1967, the Los Angeles Sharks of the WHA from 1972 to 1974, the Los Angeles Cobras of the AFL in 1988, and the original Los Angeles Stars of the ABA from 1968 to 1970. The arena played host to the top indoor track athletics meet on the West Coast, the annual Los Angeles Invitational track meet (frequently called the "Sunkist Invitational", with title sponsorship by Sunkist Growers, Incorporated), from 1960 until the event's demise in 2004.

The arena hosted the 1968 and 1972 NCAA Men's Basketball Final Four, the 1992 NCAA Women's Basketball Final Four, the 1963 NBA All-Star Game, Game 6 of the 1970 ABA Finals, and the boxing competitions during the 1984 Summer Olympics. In addition to hosting the final portion of WrestleMania 2 in 1986, the Los Angeles Memorial Sports Arena also hosted WrestleMania VII in 1991 as well as other WWE events. The arena hosted When Worlds Collide, a 1994 joint card between the Mexican lucha libre promotion Asistencia Asesoría y Administración (AAA) and WCW (which normally called the Great Western Forum home until they, too, moved to Staples Center) that is credited with introducing the lucha style to English-speaking audiences in the U.S.

After then-Clippers owner Donald Sterling turned down an agreement to re-locate the franchise permanently to Anaheim's Arrowhead Pond (now Honda Center) in 1996, the Coliseum Commission had discussions to build an on-site replacement for the Sports Arena. Plans included a seating capacity of 18,000 for basketball, 84 luxury suites, and an on-site practice facility for the Clippers. However, as a new Downtown Los Angeles sports and entertainment arena was being planned and eventually built (Staples Center) two miles north along Figueroa Street, the Coliseum Commission scuttled plans for a Sports Arena replacement, and as a result, the Clippers became one of the original tenants at the new downtown arena. There were also similar plans years earlier, in 1989, as Sterling had discussions with then-Los Angeles mayor Tom Bradley and then-Coliseum Commission president (and eventual Bradley mayoral successor) Richard Riordan about a Sports Arena replacement; Sterling threatened to leave the Sports Arena and move elsewhere in the Los Angeles region if plans did not come together.

After the Trojans departed to the new Galen Center in 2006, the arena assumed a lower profile. The arena still continued to hold high school basketball championships, as well as concerts and conventions. The UCLA men's basketball team returned to the arena to play a majority of their home games at the Sports Arena during the 2011–12 season while Pauley Pavilion underwent renovation.

=== 2010s ===
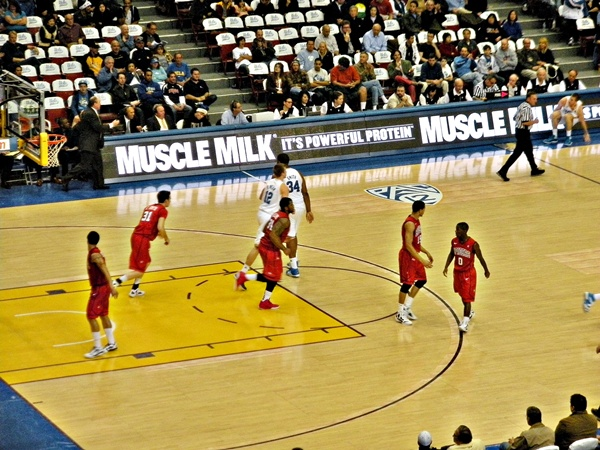
UCLA vs. Richmond, Los Angeles Memorial Sports Arena, December 23, 2011

The Los Angeles Memorial Coliseum Commission embarked on a seismic retrofit, designed to bring the Sports Arena up to 21st century seismic standards. Bentley Management Group was hired as the project manager for the Seismic Bracing Remodel. In order to reinforce the existing 316,700-square-foot (29,420 m^{2}) structure, a series of steel braced frames were connected to the existing concrete structural system at both the arena and loge levels of the building. To provide a solid footing for these steel frames, portions of the arena floor had to be excavated, then reinforced to provide extra strength. Once the steel frames were fitted and incorporated into the existing structure between existing support columns, concrete was then re-poured into the area. The original crown of the arena, one of its most distinguishing characteristics, was the countless small ceramic tiles, each measuring no more than a square inch in width. A multitude of the crown's tiles were loosening and many others were discolored. In order to remedy this, a new crown was designed, this time using individual sections of EIFS (Exterior insulation finishing system), which offered the decided advantages of better durability, easier maintenance and improved thermal characteristics. A foundation surface was applied directly over the existing tiles, in order to seal the crown and give the new surface something to adhere to. Once the structural work was finished, the walls, ceilings, doors, floors and other areas involved in the modification had to be put back together. Throughout the entire project, the Los Angeles Memorial Sports Arena remained open for business. The result was a brand-new crown around the exterior of the building, as well as a new terrazzo floor on the concourse level.

During an open session meeting on July 17, 2013, the Coliseum Commission authorized the amendment to the existing USC-Coliseum Commission Lease for the operation of the Los Angeles Memorial Coliseum and the Los Angeles Memorial Sports Arena. On July 25, 2013, the Coliseum Commission and USC executed this new long-term master lease agreement. It became effective on July 29, 2013, and the Commission transferred day-to-day management and financial responsibilities for the Coliseum and Sports Arena to USC. This included the rehiring by USC, on a fixed term basis, of the Coliseum/Sports Arena employees who had been working for the commission the previous day. For most of the former Coliseum Commission employees, the fixed term of their employment would be short-lived, ending 10 months later on May 30, 2014.

=== Closure and replacement ===
The Sports Arena was demolished in order to replace it with a more in-demand facility — a soccer-specific stadium that would house an MLS team. On May 18, 2015, Los Angeles Football Club announced its intentions to build a privately funded 22,000-seat soccer-specific stadium at the site for $250 million. The stadium would be completed by 2018.

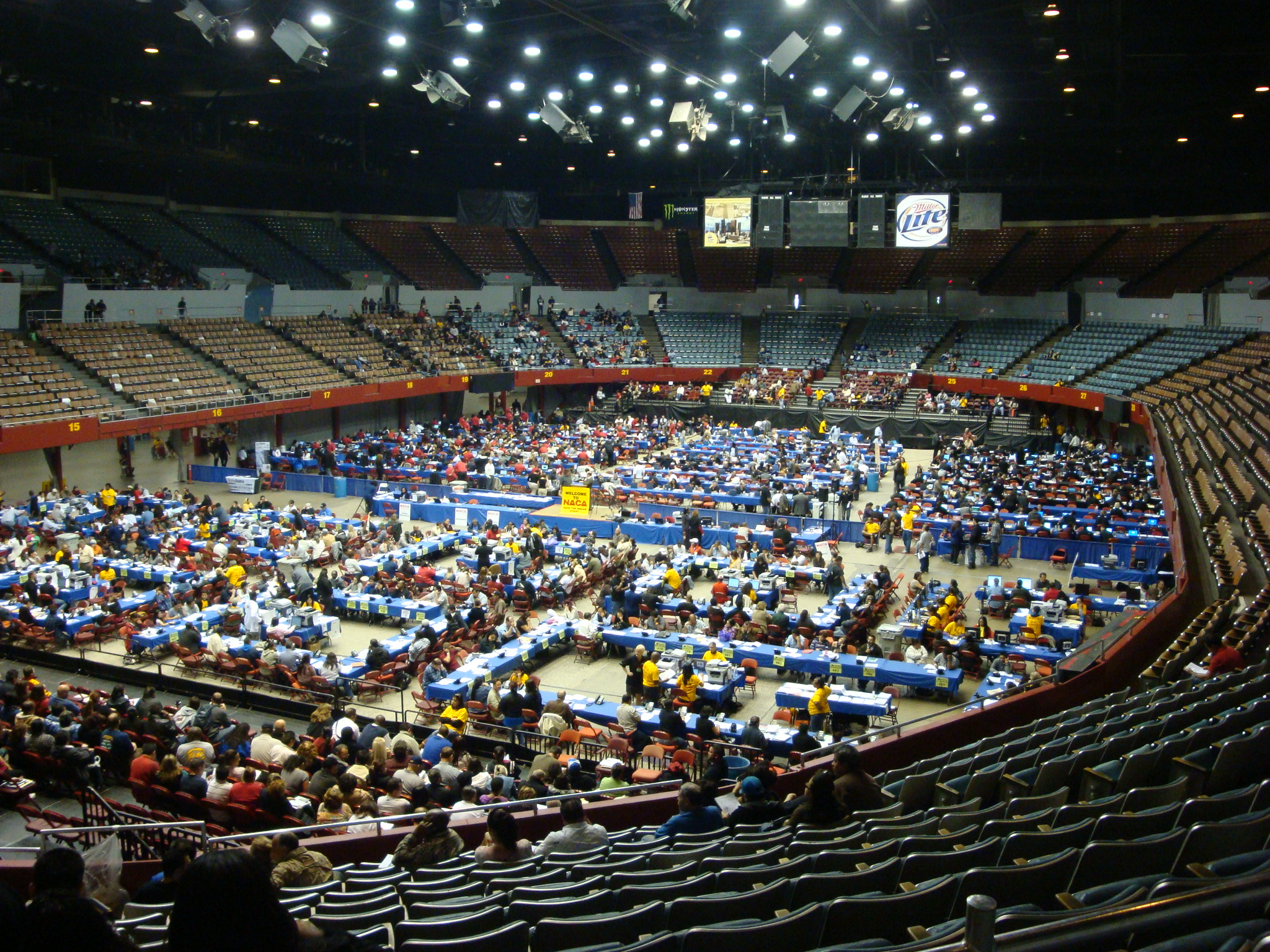
Los Angeles Memorial Sports Arena in January 2011

From March 15 to 19, 2016, Bruce Springsteen performed a series of three sold-out concerts, the last events held in the arena. When he introduced his song "Wrecking Ball" during the last concert, he opened by saying "We gotta play this one for the old building... We're gonna miss this place, it's a great place to play rock 'n' roll." The arena closed after the last concert. Demolition began in September 2016 for the new stadium development. After a groundbreaking for the new stadium, the arena was demolished between August and October 2016. BMO Stadium now stands in the old Sports Arena footprint.

== The arena ==
The arena underwent major renovations to bring it up to 21st century seismic standards and was well maintained. There were four fully equipped team rooms, two smaller rooms for officials, and two private dressing rooms for individual performers. There were two additional meeting rooms on site which could be used for administrative or hospitality functions.

The floor area comprised a 144-by-262-foot (44 by 80 m) space (38,000 sq ft (3,500 m^{2})), affording the largest standing floor capacity of any arena in the area. There was a 75-foot (23 m) vertical clearance. The arena has a unique, expansive floor-level footprint of nearly 130,000 sq ft (12,000 m^{2}) and 101,557 square feet (9,435.0 m^{2}) on the concourse level, allowing the installation of any needed display, food or other programming requirements. There was an enormous load-in ramp at the west side of the arena with a 40-foot (12 m) wide entry. Print, radio and television media was serviced on each side of the arena by installation of any kind of portable facilities. Five permanent TV locations were sited on the concourse level. In addition, a 6-foot-wide (1.8 m) catwalk was suspended from the ceiling and circled the arena for cameras or spotlights.

Spectators could reach arena level seating area either by a circulatory ramp on the southwest side of the building or by a stairway located next to the north doors. There were also escalators located at the southwest and northeast sides of the building. The Sports Arena was the first NBA arena to feature a rotating billboard at courtside, which also acted as the scorer's table. Rotating billboards eventually became standard at all NBA arenas until the mid-2000s, when LED billboard/scorer's tables were introduced.

Spectator amenities included a full-service main ticket office, a secondary box office and 2 portable booths, 6 permanent concession stands, and a first-aid station. A club and restaurant were located on the arena level of the facility. A number of operational improvements had been made to enhance accessibility for the handicapped, including the installation of 14 additional handicapped parking stalls, hand rails on both sides of the pedestrian ramp leading to the floor level seating, handicapped accessible drinking fountains, an Assistive Listening System to aid the hearing impaired, conversion of restroom facilities, dressing rooms and bathroom fixtures for the handicapped, and increased informational signage. Event presentation was augmented by a four-sided overhead scoreboard with several auxiliary boards.

=== Seating capacity ===
The arena seated up to 16,740 for boxing/wrestling, and 14,546 for hockey. There were 12,389 fixed upper-level, theater-type seats, and floor-level seating which could be configured by sport. The seating capacity for basketball changed over the years:

Years	Capacity
1959–1968	14,871
1968–1981	14,795
1981–1984	15,333

Years	Capacity
1984–1987	15,371
1987–1988	15,167
1988–1989	15,352
1989–1992	15,350
1992–1993	15,989
1993–1994	16,005
1994–2001	16,021
2001–2016	16,161

== Concerts ==
- Pink Floyd performed five shows at Memorial Sports Arena during their Wish You Were Here tour April 23–27, 1975. They would open The Wall Tour at the same venue February 7–13, 1980 and would perform three more nights in November 1987 on the A Momentary Lapse of Reason Tour.
- Jethro Tull performed at the Memorial Sports Arena between 1972 and 1987 numerous times. They would close the North American leg of their 1980 A Tour at the venue in November 1980 and recorded a live concert broadcast which would then be released in full in 2021 on the 3-CD/3-DVD expanded remixed and remastered version of the A album called A (The A La Mode) box set.
- U2 performed five shows at Memorial Sports Arena during The Joshua Tree Tour on April 17, 18, 20, 21 and 22, 1987.
- Prince performed two sold-out shows at Memorial Sports Arena during his Lovesexy Tour on November 6–7, 1988.
- Michael Jackson performed six sold-out shows at Memorial Sports Arena, during his Bad World Tour on November 13, 1988, and January 16–18, 26–27, 1989.
- Madonna performed five sold-out shows at Memorial Sports Arena during her Blond Ambition World Tour on May 11–13 and 15–16, 1990.
- The Grateful Dead performed at the Sports Arena on December 8–10 in 1993, and December 15–16 and 18–19 in 1994.
- Bruce Springsteen was a popular act at the arena, having played there 35 times between 1980 and 2016. Springsteen humorously referred to the arena as "the dump that jumps" due to its age, poor infrastructure, and its lack of VIP suites, a feature that Springsteen criticized in other arenas.
- My Chemical Romance performed on September 30, 2005, during their first headlining tour alongside Alkaline Trio and Reggie and the Full Effect.
- Daft Punk performed a sold-out show at the Sports Arena on July 21, 2007. Other than Coachella in 2006, this was the only LA-area show of the Alive 2006/2007 tour.
- The Philippine variety show of ABS-CBN titled ASAP, held an out of town show on October 11, 2014, titled "ASAP Live in LA".

== Other events ==
- The arena hosted the 1960 Democratic National Convention from July 11–15, when John F. Kennedy received the party's nomination.
- An overflow crowd of over 25,000 listened to Doctor Martin Luther King Jr. speak at a Freedom Rally on June 18, 1961, introduced by then California Governor Pat Brown
- The arena hosted the World Wrestling Federation's WrestleMania VII on March 24, 1991.
- Guns N' Roses used the arena in 2009 to rehearse and prepare for their 2009-10 Chinese Democracy world tour. They tested out the lighting, TV monitors, and pyro, as well as songs to be played on the tour.
- Bernie Sanders hosted a campaign rally on August 10, 2015, that was attended by over 27,500 people.
- The arena was the location for a memorial ceremony honoring Gerardo Hernandez, the Transportation Security Administration officer who was killed in the 2013 Los Angeles International Airport shooting.

=== Appearances in film and TV ===
- The heavyweight championship fight scenes between Rocky Balboa and Apollo Creed characters in the 1976 Best Picture winner Rocky and its first sequel, Rocky II, were filmed at the arena as a stand-in for the Spectrum in Philadelphia.
- The Arena featured in a two-part episode – "Angels on Ice" – of the second season of Charlie's Angels, 1977.
- Portions of the 1966 science fiction film Fantastic Voyage were filmed in the interior corridors and parking areas of the arena.
- The arena appears as the exterior and foyer of the euthanasia center in the 1973 film Soylent Green.
- The front of the building appears in the 1982 episode of Simon & Simon called "The Hottest Ticket in Town".
- The Fugitive episode "Decision in the Ring" features a climax that takes place in the arena.
- NBC's renewed version of American Gladiators and the 1999–2001 syndicated show Battle Dome were filmed at the arena.
- All of the concert footage from various arenas around the country in the 2015 film Straight Outta Compton were filmed at the arena. The exterior of the arena, for example, was used as a stand-in for the Omni Coliseum in Atlanta.
- The arena stands in for Madison Square Garden in Space Jam, depicting a game between the New York Knicks and Phoenix Suns.
- The arena was used to portray the Miami Blades ice rink in the Dexter season 1, episode 3 "Popping Cherry". In the episode, the Ice Truck Killer leaves a gruesome body at the rink.

== See also ==
- Los Angeles Memorial Coliseum
- Los Angeles Pop Festival

Events and tenants
Preceded by Pan-Pacific Auditorium	Home of the USC Trojans men's basketball 1959–2006	Succeeded by Galen Center
Preceded by Anaheim Convention Center	Home of the Los Angeles Stars; 1968–1970	Succeeded by Salt Palace
Preceded by Minneapolis Armory	Home of the Los Angeles Lakers; 1960–1967	Succeeded by The Forum
Preceded by San Diego Sports Arena	Home of the Los Angeles Clippers; 1984–1999	Succeeded by Staples Center
Preceded by Pan-Pacific Auditorium; Pauley Pavilion	Home of the UCLA Bruins men's basketball 1959–1965; 2011–2012	Succeeded by Pauley Pavilion
Preceded by Kiel Auditorium	Host of the NBA All-Star Game; 1963	Succeeded by Boston Garden
Preceded by Freedom Hall; Astrodome	NCAA Men's Division I Basketball Tournament; Finals venue 1968; 1972	Succeeded by Freedom Hall; St. Louis Arena
Preceded by Madison Square Garden	Host of WrestleMania 2 w/ Nassau Coliseum & Rosemont Horizon; 1986	Succeeded by Pontiac Silverdome
Preceded by SkyDome	Host of WrestleMania VII; 1991	Succeeded by Hoosier Dome
