= Germán Ohm =

Mexican boxer (born 1936)

German Ohm
Personal information
- Nickname: El Distrito
- Born: German Ohm Gómez; 28 May 1936 (age 90) Mexico City, Mexico
- Height: 1.77 m (5 ft 10 in)
- Weight: Lightweight; Featherweight; Bantamweight

Boxing career
- Reach: 183 cm (72 in)
- Stance: Orthodox

Boxing record
- Total fights: 39
- Wins: 32
- Win by KO: 22
- Losses: 6
- Draws: 1
- No contests: 0

Germán Ohm Gómez (born 28 May 1936) was a Mexican professional boxer of German ancestry.

== Professional career ==
In October 1956, he beat the future world bantamweight champion José Becerra. One of his biggest wins was an upset victory over an undefeated Carlos Cardoso.

His last fight ever was a win over Memo Diez in Matamoros, Tamaulipas, Mexico.

== Legacy ==
German turned pro when he was eighteen years old and retired less than two months after his twenty-second birthday. He never made a comeback in boxing, but is still considered one of the best Bantamweight's in the history of boxing.
