= José Becerra =

Mexican boxer (1936–2016)

Jose Becerra
Personal information
- Nickname: The Guadalajara Cobra
- Born: José Becerra Covarrubias; 15 April 1936 Guadalajara, Jalisco, Mexico
- Died: 6 August 2016 (aged 80)
- Height: 5 ft 5 in / 165cm
- Weight: Bantamweight

Boxing career

Boxing record
- Total fights: 75
- Wins: 67
- Win by KO: 42
- Losses: 5
- Draws: 3

Jesus "José" Becerra (15 April 1936 – 6 August 2016) was a Mexican professional boxer. He became the Undisputed Bantamweight World Champion in 1959. He was known as the Guadalajara Cobra.

Becerra was born in Guadalajara, Jalisco, Mexico, the youngest of the five children. His parents were Maria Covarrubias and Jesus Becerra. At age 12, in the 5th grade, Becerra quit school to work in a carriage repair shop.

== Professional career ==
Becerra received his first public notice in the Mexican sports world by scoring an upset over the vastly more experienced Manuel Armenteros. After some ups and downs, Becerra earned a top 10 ranking by knocking out former world champion Mario D'Agata. A short time later, Becerra won the Undisputed World Bantamweight Championship with a knockout over Alphonse Halimi.

After two successful title defenses, Becerra lost a stunning upset, being knocked out by club-fighter Eloy Sanchez in a non-title fight. Becerra was so dejected by the defeat that he announced his retirement at age 24.

In 1962, Mexican club fighter, Rudy Coronado was seriously injured in a fight. On a special benefit show for Coronado and his family, Becerra returned to the ring and won a 6-round decision over Alberto Martinez. Becerra donated his fight-purse to the injured boxer's family. Becerra never fought again.

== Professional boxing record ==
75 fights	67 wins	5 losses
By knockout	42	2
By decision	24	3
By disqualification	1	0
Draws	3	

No.	Result	Record	Opponent	Type	Round, time	Date	Location	Notes
75	Win	67–5–3	Alberto Martínez	PTS	6	13 Oct 1962	Arena Progreso, Guadalajara, Mexico	
74	Loss	66–5–3	Eloy Sánchez	KO	8 (10), 2:52	30 Aug 1960	Plaza de Toros, Ciudad Juárez, Mexico	
73	Win	66–4–3	Chuy Rodríguez	TKO	4 (10)	12 Aug 1960	Tampico, Tamaulipas, Mexico	
72	Win	65–4–3	Kenji Yonekura	SD	15	23 May 1960	Korakuen Baseball Stadium, Tokyo, Japan	Retained NYSAC, NBA and The Ring bantamweight titles
71	Win	64–4–3	Pimi Barajas	TKO	7 (10)	10 Apr 1960	Estadio de la Revolución, Torreón, Mexico	
70	Win	63–4–3	Ward Yee	UD	10	15 Mar 1960	Freeman Coliseum, San Antonio, Texas, U.S.	
69	Win	62–4–3	Alphonse Halimi	KO	9 (15), 0:48	4 Feb 1960	Memorial Coliseum, Los Angeles, California, U.S.	Retained NYSAC, NBA and The Ring bantamweight titles
68	Win	61–4–3	Héctor Ceballos	KO	3 (10)	18 Dec 1959	Ciudad Obregón, Sonora, Mexico	
67	Win	60–4–3	Frankie Duran	UD	10	12 Dec 1959	Plaza de Toros, Nogales, Mexico	
66	Win	59–4–3	Walt Ingram	TKO	9 (10)	24 Oct 1959	Arena Coliseo, Guadalajara, Mexico	
65	Win	58–4–3	Alphonse Halimi	KO	8 (15), 2:02	8 Jul 1959	Sports Arena, Los Angeles, California, U.S.	Won NYSAC, NBA and The Ring bantamweight titles
64	Win	57–4–3	Billy Peacock	KO	1 (10)	20 Apr 1959	Tijuana, Baja California, Mexico	
63	Win	56–4–3	Chuy Rodríguez	KO	4 (10)	19 Mar 1959	Arena Progreso, Guadalajara, Mexico	
62	Win	55–4–3	Mario D'Agata	RTD	10 (12)	5 Feb 1959	Olympic Auditorium, Los Angeles, California, U.S.	
61	Win	54–4–3	Ross Padilla	KO	1	30 Nov 1958	Mexicali, Baja California, Mexico	
60	Win	53–4–3	José Luis Mora	KO	5 (10)	25 Oct 1958	Arena Canada Dry, Guadalajara, Mexico	
59	Win	52–4–3	Little Cezar	TKO	4 (10), 1:40	5 Sep 1958	Wrigley Field, Los Angeles, California, U.S.	
58	Win	51–4–3	Willie Parker	KO	2 (10)	14 Aug 1958	Olympic Auditorium, Los Angeles, California, U.S.	
57	Win	50–4–3	Joey Augustin	KO	5	21 Jul 1958	Tijuana, Baja California, U.S.	
56	Win	49–4–3	Gaetano Annaloro	TKO	10 (10)	28 Jun 1958	Arena Canada Dry, Guadalajara, Mexico	
55	Win	48–4–3	Charlie DeBow	KO	3	24 May 1958	El Toreo de Cuatro Caminos, Mexico City, Mexico	
54	Win	47–4–3	Miguel Lazu	TKO	7 (10)	12 Apr 1958	Mexico City, Distrito Federal, Mexico	
53	Win	46–4–3	Héctor Agúndez	PTS	10	31 Mar 1958	Tapachula, Chiapas, Mexico	
52	Win	45–4–3	Dwight Hawkins	TKO	9 (10)	8 Mar 1958	Arena Progreso, Guadalajara, Mexico	
51	Win	44–4–3	José Medel	PTS	10	8 Feb 1958	Mexico City, Distrito Federal, Mexico	
50	Win	43–4–3	Jorge Herrera	KO	4 (12)	25 Jan 1958	Arema Progreso, Guadalajara, Mexico	
49	Loss	42–4–3	Dwight Hawkins	KO	4 (10), 0:24	6 Nov 1957	Wrigley Field, Los Angeles, California, U.S.	
48	Win	42–3–3	Ramón Antonio Calatayud	PTS	10	12 Oct 1957	Mexico City, Distrito Federal, Mexico	
47	Draw	41–3–3	Raúl Leanos	PTS	10	17 Aug 1957	Monterrey, Nuevo León, Mexico	
46	Win	41–3–2	Kid Irapuato	TKO	8 (10)	1 Aug 1957	Tijuana, Baja California, Mexico	
45	Win	40–3–2	Johnny Ortega	TKO	4 (6)	15 Jun 1957	Cow Palace, Daly City, California, U.S.	
44	Win	39–3–2	José Luis Mora	PTS	10	25 May 1957	Mexico City, Distrito Federal, Mexico	
43	Win	38–3–2	Chuy Rodríguez	PTS	10	27 Apr 1957	Mexico City, Distrito Federal, Mexico	
42	Win	37–3–2	Juan 'Lefty' Perez	TKO	4 (10)	2 Apr 1957	Auditorio Municipal, Tijuana, Mexico	
41	Win	36–3–2	José Medel	PTS	10	2 Mar 1957	Mexico City, Distrito Federal, Mexico	
40	Win	35–3–2	José Medel	PTS	10	9 Feb 1957	Monterrey, Nuevo León, Mexico	
39	Win	34–3–2	Manuel Armenteros	PTS	10	12 Jan 1957	Monterrey, Nuevo León, Mexico	
38	Win	33–3–2	Jorge Herrera	TKO	7 (10)	1 Jan 1957	Plaza de Toros Torreón, Mexico	
37	Win	32–3–2	Chuy Guerrero	PTS	10	7 Nov 1956	Plaza de Toros, Torreón, Mexico	
36	Loss	31–3–2	Germán Ohm	UD	10	18 Oct 1956	Arena Olímpico Laguna, Gómez Palacio, Mexico	
35	Win	31–2–2	Memo Sánchez	PTS	10	6 Sep 1956	Arena Olímpico Laguna, Gómez Palacio, Mexico	
34	Win	30–2–2	Jorge Gabino Gómez	DQ	5 (10)	9 Aug 1956	Arena Olímpico Laguna, Gómez Palacio, Mexico	Gómez was disqualified for going down voluntarily
33	Win	29–2–2	Mario Ruíz	PTS	10	21 Jun 1956	Arena Olímpico Laguna, Gómez Palacio, Mexico	
32	Win	28–2–2	Rogelio Saucedo	PTS	10	31 May 1956	Arena Olímpico Laguna, Gómez Palacio, Mexico	
31	Win	27–2–2	Jorge Valverde	TKO	7 (10)	11 May 1956	Arena Olímpico Laguna, Gómez Palacio, Mexico	
30	Win	26–2–2	Germán Ohm	RTD	5 (10)	22 Mar 1956	Arena Olímpico Laguna, Gómez Palacio, Mexico	
29	Loss	25–2–2	Cachorro Martínez	PTS	10	18 Feb 1956	Arena Progreso, Guadalajara, Mexico	
28	Win	25–1–2	Antonio Guevara	KO	10	11 Feb 1956	León, Guanajuato, Mexico	
27	Win	24–1–2	Rayito García	PTS	10	15 Oct 1955	Arena Progreso, Guadalajara, Mexico	
26	Win	23–1–2	Antonio Guevara	KO	10	8 Oct 1955	León, Guanajuato, Mexico	
25	Win	22–1–2	Pepe Villa	TKO	7	4 Oct 1955	Mexico	
24	Win	21–1–2	Félix Gaytán	PTS	10	16 Jul 1955	Arena Progreso, Guadalajara, Mexico	
23	Win	20–1–2	Fili Presa	KO	4	2 Jul 1955	León, Guanajuato, Mexico	
22	Win	19–1–2	Chava Santiago	KO	6 (10)	27 Jun 1955	Arena Progreso, Guadalajara, Mexico	
21	Draw	18–1–2	Danny Bedolla	PTS	10	11 Jun 1955	Morelia, Michoacán, Mexico	
20	Win	18–1–1	Joe Chamaco	KO	5 (10)	28 May 1955	Arena Progreso, Guadalajara, Mexico	
19	Win	17–1–1	Chuy Guerrero	KO	4 (10)	5 Mar 1955	Arena Progreso, Guadalajara, Mexico	
18	Win	16–1–1	Marcelo González	PTS	8	12 Feb 1955	Arena Parque Oro, Guadalajara, Mexico	
17	Win	15–1–1	Kid Sonorita	KO	4 (8)	4 Dec 1954	Arena Parque Oro, Guadalajara, Mexico	
16	Win	14–1–1	José Luis Navarro	PTS	6	18 Oct 1954	Arena Parque Oro, Guadalajara, Mexico	
15	Win	13–1–1	Tomás Cervantes	TKO	3 (6)	20 Sep 1954	Arena Parque Oro, Guadalajara, Mexico	
14	Win	12–1–1	Mario León	KO	3 (6)	6 Sep 1954	Arena Parque Oro, Guadalajara, Mexico	
13	Draw	11–1–1	José Luis Navarro	PTS	6	23 Aug 1954	Arena Parque Oro, Guadalajara, Mexico	
12	Win	11–1	Kid Pichilingo	KO	6 (6)	3 Aug 1954	Arena Parque Oro, Guadalajara, Mexico	
11	Win	10–1	Alfredo Escalante	PTS	6	19 Jul 1954	Arena Parque Oro, Guadalajara, Mexico	
10	Win	9–1	Pompeyo Gutíerrez	TKO	3 (6)	3 Jul 1954	Arena Progreso, Guadalajara, Mexico	
9	Win	8–1	Raúl Pérez	KO	2 (4)	12 Jun 1954	Arena Progreso, Guadalajara, Mexico	
8	Win	7–1	Jess Mariscal	KO	2 (4)	5 Jun 1954	Arena Progreso, Guadalajara, Mexico	
7	Win	6–1	César Reynoso	TKO	4 (4)	15 May 1954	Arena Progreso, Guadalajara, Mexico	
6	Win	5–1	Rubén Espinosa	PTS	6	2 May 1954	Guadalajara, Jalisco, Mexico	
5	Win	4–1	Jorge Plascencia	PTS	4	13 Mar 1954	Arena Progreso, Guadalajara, Mexico	
4	Win	3–1	Raúl Salazar	PTS	6	24 Oct 1953	Atemajac, Jalisco, Mexico	
3	Loss	2–1	Lorenzo Ibarra	PTS	6	3 Oct 1953	Guadalajara, Jalisco, Mexico	
2	Win	2–0	Miguel Estrada	KO	5 (6)	6 Sep 1953	Atemajac, Jalisco, Mexico	
1	Win	1–0	Ray Gómez	KO	4 (6)	30 Aug 1953	Guadalajara, Jalisco, Mexico	

== Titles in boxing ==
=== Major world titles ===
- NYSAC bantamweight champion (118 lbs)
- NBA (WBA) bantamweight champion (118 lbs)

=== The Ring magazine titles ===
- The Ring bantamweight champion (118 lbs)

=== Undisputed titles ===
- Undisputed bantamweight champion

== Exhibition Tour ==
As world champion, Becerra went on a successful exhibition tour which drew big crowds. The tour was as follows:

- 1959: Sept. 1-Sandy Garcia, Fresno, CA......Exch. 4 rounds
- 1959: Date ?-Joe Vargas, Stockton, CA.......Exch. TKO 3 rounds
- 1959: Sept.8- Willie Sanchez, San Jose, CA..Exch. 2 rounds
- 1959: Sept.8-Cy Ruiz, San Jose, CA,.........Exch. 2 rounds
- 1959: Sept.9-Eduardo Santos, El Paso, TX....Exch. 4 rounds
- 1959: Sept.?-Jessie Leija, San Antonio, TX..Exch. 4 rounds
- 1959: Sept.14-Henry Miramontes, Dallas, TX..Exch. 4 rounds

== See also ==
- List of world bantamweight boxing champions
- List of Mexican boxing world champions

Achievements
Preceded by Alphonse Halimi	World Bantamweight Champion; July 8, 1959 - May 23, 1960; Vacated	Succeeded by Eder Jofre
