= Ricardo Moreno =

Mexican boxer

Personal information
- Nickname: El Pajarito
- Nationality: (Mexico) Mexican
- Born: Ricardo Moreno Escamilla; February 7, 1937 Chalchihuites, Zacatecas, Mexico
- Died: June 25, 2008 (aged 71)
- Height: 5 ft 7 in (170 cm)
- Weight: Super Featherweight; Featherweight; Super Bantamweight; Bantamweight

Boxing career
- Reach: 70 in (180 cm)
- Stance: Orthodox

Boxing record
- Total fights: 73
- Wins: 60
- Win by KO: 59
- Losses: 12
- Draws: 1
- No contests: 0

Ricardo Moreno Escamilla (February 7, 1937 – June 25, 2008) was a Mexican professional boxer in the Super Featherweight division. Moreno was ranked #76 on The Ring's list of 100 All time Greatest Punchers.

== Early life ==
Moreno was born and raised in the mining town of Chalchihuites, Zacatecas, Mexico. He left school to work as a metal breaker at the mines. Later he went to Mexico City where he worked as a parking lot attendant before turning to boxing. He did not fight as an amateur and turned professional at age 17 on June 16, 1954.

== Professional career ==
Known as "Pajarito", Moreno was a heavy puncher, having won 19 of his first 20 fights with all 19 of his wins by KO.

=== World Featherweight Title ===
His only shot at a World Championship was on April 1, 1958, Moreno fought the champion Hogan Bassey in Wrigley Field, Los Angeles, California. Ricardo would lose this fight and it would also be Moreno's only shot at a world title due in large part to boxing politics.

After suffering two consecutive defeats in 1967, the 30-year-old Moreno retired. His only victory that wasn't a knockout was a disqualification victory.

Due to his incredible knockout power, Moreno was named to the Ring Magazine's list of 100 Greatest Punchers.

== Professional record ==
60 Wins (59 knockouts, 0 decisions, 1 disqualification), 12 Losses (8 knockouts, 4 decisions), 1 Draw
Res.	Record	Opponent	Type	Rd., Time	Date	Location	Notes
Loss	60-12-1	(Mexico) Silverio Ortiz	KO	4 (10)	1967-08-13	Macuspana, Tabasco, Mexico	
Loss	60-11-1	(United States) Alex Benitez	KO	3 (12), 1:21	1967-02-09	(United States) Olympic Auditorium, Los Angeles, California	For California state Featherweight title.
Win	60-10-1	(United States) Joey Aguilar	TKO	4 (10)	1966-12-21	(United States) Coliseum, San Diego, California	
Loss	59-10-1	(United States) Raul Rojas	KO	2 (12), 2:40	1966-06-03	(United States) Sports Arena, Los Angeles, California	
Loss	59-9-1	(United States) Raul Rojas	RTD	3 (10), 3:00	1966-03-17	(United States) Olympic Auditorium, Los Angeles, California	
Win	59-8-1	(Mexico) Victor Robles	KO	4 (10), 1:40	1965-10-28	(United States) San Jose Civic, San Jose, California	
Win	58-8-1	(Mexico) Tony Vazquez	KO	2 (10), 1:58	1965-08-26	(United States) Auditorium, Oakland, California	
Win	57-8-1	(Portugal) Fernando Goncalves	TKO	3 (10), 2:35	1965-06-26	(United States) Auditorium, Oakland, California	
Win	56-8-1	(Mexico) Beto Maldonado	KO	7 (10), 0:57	1965-05-22	(United States) San Jose Civic, San Jose, California	
Win	55-8-1	(Philippines) Danny Kid	TKO	4 (10), 2:31	1965-04-26	(United States) Civic Auditorium, San Francisco, California	
Win	54-8-1	(United States) Trino Savala	KO	2 (10), 0:42	1965-04-10	(United States) San Jose Civic, San Jose, California	
Win	53-8-1	(Mexico) Manuel Ochoa	KO	2 (10), 1:28	1965-03-22	(United States) Civic Auditorium, San Francisco, California	
Win	52-8-1	(Mexico) Luis Echevesta	KO	1 (10), 2:21	1965-03-02	(United States) Auditorium, Oakland, California	
Win	51-8-1	(United States) Benny Burton	RTD	5 (10), 3:00	1965-02-20	(United States) San Jose, California	
Win	50-8-1	(Mexico) Babby Lopez	KO	3 (10)	1964-12-10	Acapulco, Guerrero, Mexico	
Win	49-8-1	Mexico Solis	KO	1 (10)	1964-11-22	Uruapan, Michoacan, Mexico	
Win	48-8-1	(Mexico) Ventarron Lara	KO	1 (10)	1964-10-24	Zitacuaro, Michoacan, Mexico	
Win	47-8-1	(Mexico) Silverio Ortiz	KO	3 (10)	1964-07-18	Ciudad del Carmen, Campeche, Mexico	
Win	46-8-1	(Mexico) Jose Miguel Moreno	KO	6 (10)	1964-06-27	Durango, Durango, Mexico	
Win	45-8-1	(Mexico) Ray Antunez	KO	2 (10)	1964-06-15	Taxco, Guerrero, Mexico	
Win	44-8-1	(Mexico) Salve Ortiz	KO	3 (10)	1964-05-27	Tapachula, Chiapas, Mexico	
Win	43-8-1	(Mexico) Lobito Cortez	KO	2 (10)	1964-05-16	Morelia, Michoacan, Mexico	
Win	42-8-1	(Mexico) Maurillio Kid	KO	2 (10)	1964-04-21	Tapachula, Chiapas, Mexico	
Win	41-8-1	(Mexico) Tiger Soliz	KO	3 (10)	1964-04-17	Tapachula, Chiapas, Mexico	
Win	40-8-1	(Mexico) Cruz Figueroa	KO	2 (10)	1964-03-11	Cuernavaca, Morelos, Mexico	
Win	39-8-1	(Mexico) Panchito Ortiz	KO	2 (10)	1964-01-10	Merida, Yucatan, Mexico	
Win	38-8-1	(United States) Teddy Rand	DQ	5 (10)	1961-12-03	Leon, Guanajuato, Mexico	
Loss	37-8-1	(Mexico) Claudio Adame	KO	7 (10)	1961-01-08	Plaza de Toros, Torreon, Coahuila, Mexico	
Win	37-7-1	(Mexico) Panchito Villa II	KO	3 (10)	1960-12-04	Sabinas, Coahuila, Mexico	
Win	36-7-1	(Mexico) Hector Garcia	KO	4 (10)	1960-11-05	Aguascalientes, Aguascalientes, Mexico	
Loss	35-7-1	(Mexico) Kid Irapuato	UD	10	1960-06-27	Plaza de Toros, Tijuana, Baja California, Mexico	
Loss	35-6-1	(Mexico) Kid Anahuac	UD	10	1960-02-27	Arena Mexico, Mexico City, Mexico	
Win	35-5-1	(Mexico) Luis Sanchez	KO	3 (10)	1959-10-25	Plaza de Toros, Ciudad Juarez, Chihuahua, Mexico	
Win	34-5-1	(Mexico) Hector Garcia	KO	4 (10)	1959-09-27	Chihuahua, Chihuahua, Mexico	
Win	33-5-1	(Republic of Ireland) Pat McCoy	KO	5 (10)	1959-05-30	Monterrey, Nuevo León, Mexico	
Win	32-5-1	(United States) Al Wilcher	KO	2 (10)	1959-03-22	Nogales, Sonora, Mexico	
Loss	31-5-1	(United States) Davey Moore	KO	1 (10), 2:58	1958-12-11	(United States) Olympic Auditorium, Los Angeles, California	
Win	31-4-1	(United States) Frankie Salas	KO	2 (10)	1958-10-05	Mexicali, Baja California, Mexico	
Win	30-4-1	(United States) Rocky Fontanette	KO	1 (10)	1958-08-24	Sabinas, Coahuila, Mexico	
Loss	29-4-1	(Nigeria) Hogan Kid Bassey	KO	3 (15), 2:58	1958-04-01	(United States) Wrigley Field, Los Angeles, California	For NBA, The Ring & Lineal Featherweight titles.
Win	29-3-1	(United States) Ike Chestnut	TKO	6 (10), 2:59	1957-11-21	(United States) Olympic Auditorium, Los Angeles, California	
Loss	28-3-1	(United States) Jose Luis Cotero	KO	7 (10), 2:24	1957-05-28	(United States) Gilmore Field, Los Angeles, California	
Win	28-2-1	(Tunisia) Gaetano Annaloro	TKO	5 (10), 1:33	1957-04-01	(United States) Cow Palace, Daly City, California	
Win	27-2-1	(United States) Tommy Bain	TKO	3 (10), 1:22	1957-02-12	(United States) Legion Stadium, Hollywood, California	
Win	26-2-1	(United States) Jesse Mongia	KO	2 (10), 1:06	1957-01-29	(United States) County Coliseum, El Paso, Texas	
Win	25-2-1	(United States) Sherman Liggins	KO	2 (10)	1956-12-16	Nuevo Laredo, Tamaulipas Mexico	
Win	24-2-1	(United States) Billy Evans	KO	3 (10)	1956-10-06	Arena Mexico, Mexico City Mexico	
Win	23-2-1	(United States) Pappy Gault	KO	3 (10), 1:30	1956-08-15	Tijuana, Baja California Mexico	
Win	22-2-1	(United States) Frankie Campos	KO	4 (10)	1956-06-23	Arena Mexico, Mexico City, Mexico	
Win	21-2-1	(Cuba) Oscar Suarez	KO	2 (10)	1956-04-28	Arena Mexico, Mexico City, Mexico	
Win	20-2-1	(Mexico) Alejo Mejia	KO	5 (10)	1956-03-23	Piedras Negras, Coahuila, Mexico	
Draw	19-2-1	(Mexico) Kildo Martinez	TD	2 (10)	1956-03-04	Mexicali, Baja California, Mexico	
Loss	19-2	(Mexico) Memo Diez	UD	10	1956-01-22	Toreo de Cuatro Caminos, Mexico City, Mexico	
Win	19-1	(Mexico) Jorge Gabino Gomez	KO	2 (10)	1955-11-24	Mexico City, Mexico	
Win	18-1	(Mexico) Mario Macias	RTD	4 (10), 3:00	1955-10-29	Mexico City, Mexico	
Win	17-1	(Mexico) Pedro Garcia	KO	1 (10)	1955-09-10	Mexico City, Mexico	
Win	16-1	(Mexico) Americo Rivera	KO	2 (10)	1955-07-27	Mexico City, Mexico	
Win	15-1	(Mexico) Aurelio Rivera	KO	1 (10)	1955-07-02	Mexico City, Mexico	
Win	14-1	(Mexico) Mike Cruz	KO	6 (10)	1955-06-11	Mexico City, Mexico	
Win	13-1	(Mexico) Fifi Torres	KO	2 (10)	1955-05-21	Mexico City, Mexico	
Win	12-1	(Mexico) Danny Bedolla	KO	1 (10)	1955-05-04	Mexico City, Mexico	
Win	11-1	(Mexico) Jorge Gabino Gomez	KO	7 (10)	1955-04-06	Mexico City, Mexico	
Win	10-1	(Mexico) Cheto Fernandez	KO	2 (8)	1955-03-10	Arena Coliseo, Mexico City, Mexico	
Win	9-1	(Mexico) Pepe Chavarria	KO	1 (8)	1955-02-19	Mexico City, Mexico	
Win	8-1	(Mexico) Babe Gomez	KO	3 (8)	1955-01-19	Mexico City, Mexico	
Win	7-1	(Mexico) Jorge Herrera	KO	7 (10)	1954-12-12	Guadalajara, Jalisco, Mexico	
Win	6-1	(Mexico) Fernando Garcia	KO	1 (8)	1954-11-11	Acapulco, Guerrero, Mexico	
Win	5-1	(United States) Chato Monroy	KO	1 (8)	1954-10-23	Mexico City, Mexico	
Loss	4-1	(Mexico) Nacho Escalante	SD	6	1954-09-04	Mexico City, Mexico	
Win	4-0	(Mexico) Antonio Coria	KO	4 (8)	1954-08-11	Mexico City, Mexico	
Win	3-0	(Mexico) Sergio Farias	KO	4 (8)	1954-07-24	Mexico City, Mexico	
Win	2-0	(Mexico) Juancito Lopez	KO	1 (6)	1954-06-23	Mexico City, Mexico	
Win	1-0	(Mexico) Oscar Diaz	KO	1 (6)	1954-06-16	Mexico City, Mexico	Professional debut.

== Life after boxing ==
Moreno starred in two films, he even had a relationship with Miss Universe contestant and actress Ana Bertha Lepe.

Mexico still to this day mourns the life of the great Ricardo "Pajarito" Moreno, who as young boxer was turned on to cocaine by the jet set of Mexico. He died a depressed man at the age of 71 at a Rehabilitation Center in Durango.

He is buried in his home town of Chalchihuites in El Panteón Dolores.
