= Robert Cohen (boxer) =

French boxer (1930–2022)

Personal information
- Nickname: Gambuch (Short Legs)
- Nationality: (France) French
- Born: 15 November 1930 Bône, French Algeria, France
- Died: 2 March 2022 (aged 91) Brussels, Belgium
- Height: 5 ft 2.5 in (1.59 m)
- Weight: Bantamweight

Boxing career
- Stance: Orthodox

Boxing record
- Total fights: 43
- Wins: 36
- Win by KO: 14
- Losses: 4
- Draws: 3

Robert Cohen (15 November 1930 – 2 March 2022) was a French boxer. Cohen was World Bantamweight Champion from 1954 to 1956. He was managed by Robert (Bobby) Diamond, and Gaston Charles-Raymond.

== Early life and amateur career ==
Cohen was born in Bône, a port city in French Algeria, on 15 November 1930 to a Sephardi Jewish family in a French territory that would soon suffer from the shadow of the Pro-Nazi Vichy regime. Though the family survived the Holocaust, Cohen's father had little wish for his son to pursue a career in boxing. Robert would sometimes escape the house using the window to watch his older brother Léon earn a living boxing. Entering the French Amateur Championships after winning an Algerian title in 1950, he was beaten in the finals by Jacques Dumesnil. The following year he lost the finals again to Joseph Perez, but caught the attention of European promoter Charles Raymond who offered to manage him.

== Professional career ==
Cohen, who at 5' 3-1/2", was a short but muscular champion, won the French bantamweight title in November 1953 and the European championship in January 1954.

Between September 1951 and May 1954, Cohen won a remarkable 34 of 37 fights, losing only one to Robert Munier in Paris, France, and drawing twice.

On 20 October 1952, he defeated Theo Medina in a ten-round points decision in Paris. Andre Valignat fell to Cohen on November 17, 1952 in another ten round points decision. Cohen upset Jean Snyers, winning a ten-round points decision in Paris on 23 February 1953.

He defeated Pappy Gault on 15 April 1953 in a ten-round points decision in Paris, before a crowd of 8,000.

=== French and European bantam champ ===
On 6 November 1953, Cohen defeated French bantamweight champion Maurice Sandeyron easily taking the title in a fifteen-round bout in Paris, having beaten Sandeyron earlier on 19 January in a ninth-round knockout in a non-title bout. A religious Jew, one source noted that he briefly attended a Synagogue the morning of the match.

Cohen defeated Jake Tuli on 14 December 1953, in Manchester, Lancashire, England, in ten rounds.

Before a crowd of 20,000, on 27 February 1954, Cohen took the European Bantamweight Title, defeating John Kelly in a third-round knockout in Belfast, County Down, Northern Ireland, Ulster. Cohen knocked Kelly to the mat for counts of four, seven and six in the second round. Kelly was down again at the end of the second from a right hook shortly before the bell. Thirty seconds into the third, Kelly went down for the full count from a right to the jaw.

=== World bantam champ ===
On 19 September 1954, he won the vacant World bantamweight title in a fifteen-round split decision in Bangkok, Thailand, against police Lieutenant Chamroem Songkitrat. An enormous crowd of 60,000 that included the King and Queen of Thailand watched the bloody contest. Cohen was left with a badly sprained or broken wrist in the fifth and his opponent with a broken nose. Cohen was formerly the European Bantamweight Champion. Later that year, his marriage took place at the Synagogue de la rue des Tournelles, in Paris, presided by Rabbi David Feuerwerker.

On 20 December 1954, he defeated Roy Ankrah in a fourth-round technical knockout in Paris.

=== Stripped of World bantam title ===
On 23 December 1954, Cohen was stripped of his title by the National Boxing Association for failing to defend it within 90 days against Raul "Raton" Macias. Few sanctioning bodies other than the NBA recognized Macias as the World Champion. Both the New York State Athletic Commission and the European Boxing Union continued to recognize Cohen as champion. On 11 December 1955 Cohen lost in a ten-round technical knockout against French featherweight champion Cherif Hamia before a crowd of 14,000. Cohen was down for an eight count in the second from a right cross to the jaw and was down again in the seventh from a right hook. The referee ended the bout 1:27 into the tenth round, when Cohen's left brow was injured by a left from Hamia. Some time after the bout, Cohen was severely injured in an automobile accident, and suffered a broken jaw. He attempted to defend his title, but the injury shortened his career.

On 3 September 1955, he drew with Willie Toweel in a fifteen-round world bantamweight title bout in Johannesburg, South Africa. Cohen dropped Toweel three times in the second and put him down for a no count in the tenth. Toweel had never been knocked to the mat in a previous bout. In a brutal bout, Cohen was deeply fatigued by the end of the match.

Cohen lost a title bout to Mario D'Agata on 29 June 1956 before a crowd of 38,000, in a seventh-round technical knockout in Rome. D'Agata dropped Cohen to the mat for a nine count near the end of the sixth. After the sixth ended, the referee stopped the fight due to a serious gash over the left brow of Cohen. D'Agata appeared superior in the in-fighting, and many of Cohen's blows were wide of his mark. America's National Boxing Association (NBA) did not recognize the match as a title bout, though nearly every other world boxing organization did. Only a year and a half earlier, D'Agata had been injured by a shotgun blast.

His professional record over 43 bouts was 36 wins (14 KOs), 4 losses, and 3 draws.

== Life after boxing ==
Cohen retired after his fight with Mario D'Agata, and a comeback attempt three years later against Peter Locke in July 1959.

Suffering from injuries, he retired from boxing in the 1960s, and moved with his wife, Zita, to the Congo-Brazzaville and began working in his father-in-law's textile and retail business. Unhappy in the textile business, he opened a boxing gym with some success, but his best boxers left for Europe after it was nationalized, and he left the gym.

In the 1980s Cohen managed a textile import and export business in Brussels, Belgium.

His biography, Gambuch, a book written by Michel Rosenzweig was published in 2012 by the widely-known French publisher L'Harmattan. A movie of Cohen's life, produced by Shanghai-based Italian entrepreneur Jonathan L. Hasson, was in production in 2012.

Cohen died on 2 March 2022, at the age of 91.

== Hall of Fame ==
Cohen, who was Jewish, was inducted into the International Jewish Sports Hall of Fame in 1988.

== Professional boxing record ==
43 fights	36 wins	4 losses
By knockout	14	2
By decision	22	2
Draws	3	

No.	Result	Record	Opponent	Type	Round	Date	Location	Notes
43	Loss	36–4–3	Peter Lock	PTS	10	Jul 13, 1959	Raylton Sports Club, N'Dola, Zambia	
42	Loss	36–3–3	Mario D'Agata	TKO	7 (15)	Jun 29, 1956	Stadio Olimpico, Roma, Lazio, Italy	Lost NYSAC and The Ring bantamweight titles
41	Loss	36–2–3	Cherif Hamia	TKO	10 (10)	Dec 10, 1955	Palais des Sports, Paris, France	
40	Draw	36–1–3	Willie Toweel	PTS	15	Sep 3, 1955	Rand Stadium, Johannesburg, Gauteng, South Africa	Retained NYSAC and The Ring bantamweight titles
39	Win	36–1–2	Roy Ankrah	TKO	4 (10)	Dec 20, 1954	Palais des Sports, Paris, France	
38	Win	35–1–2	Chamroen Songkitrat	SD	15	Sep 19, 1954	National Stadium Gymnasium, Bangkok, Thailand	Won vacant NYSAC, NBA, and The Ring bantamweight titles
37	Win	34–1–2	Mario D'Agata	UD	10	May 15, 1954	Stade de la Pépinière, Tunis, Tunisia	
36	Win	33–1–2	Manny Kid Francis	PTS	10	Apr 30, 1954	King's Hall, Belle Vue, Manchester, Lancashire, England	
35	Win	32–1–2	Eddie Carson	PTS	10	Apr 7, 1954	Kelvin Hall, Glasgow, Scotland	
34	Win	31–1–2	John Kelly	KO	3 (15)	Feb 27, 1954	Kings Hall, Belfast, Northern Ireland	Won EBU bantamweight title
33	Win	30–1–2	Jake Tuli	PTS	10	Dec 14, 1953	King's Hall, Belle Vue, Manchester, Lancashire, England	
32	Win	29–1–2	Maurice Sandeyron	PTS	15	Nov 6, 1953	Palais des Sports, Paris, France	Won vacant France bantamweight title
31	Win	28–1–2	Dante Bini	PTS	10	Oct 17, 1953	Palais de la Foire, Casablanca, Morocco	
30	Win	27–1–2	Teddy Peckham	RTD	6 (10)	Sep 25, 1953	King's Hall, Belle Vue, Manchester, Lancashire, England	
29	Draw	26–1–2	Gaetano Annaloro	PTS	10	May 31, 1953	Marseille, Bouches-du-Rhône, France	
28	Win	26–1–1	Pappy Gault	PTS	10	Apr 15, 1953	Palais des Sports, Paris, France	
27	Draw	25–1–1	Jean Sneyers	PTS	10	Mar 28, 1953	Palais des Sports, Schaerbeek, Bruxelles-Capitale, Belgium	
26	Win	25–1	Gaetano Annaloro	PTS	10	Mar 19, 1953	Salle Wagram, Paris, France	
25	Win	24–1	Jean Sneyers	PTS	10	Feb 23, 1953	Palais des Sports, Paris, France	
24	Win	23–1	Maurice Sandeyron	RTD	9 (10)	Jan 19, 1953	Salle Wagram, Paris, France	
23	Win	22–1	Marcel Mathieu	RTD	7 (10)	Dec 19, 1952	Palais des Sports, Paris, France	
22	Win	21–1	Andre Valignat	PTS	10	Nov 17, 1952	Palais des Sports, Paris, France	
21	Win	20–1	Theo Medina	PTS	10	Oct 20, 1952	Salle Wagram, Paris, France	
20	Win	19–1	Dante Bini	PTS	10	Oct 2, 1952	Salle Wagram, Paris, France	
19	Win	18–1	Roland Gibert	KO	1 (8)	Sep 18, 1952	Salle Wagram, Paris, France	
18	Win	17–1	Tino Cardinale	PTS	8	Jun 30, 1952	Palais des Sports, Paris, France	
17	Win	16–1	Andre Jasse	RTD	9 (10)	May 31, 1952	Salle Wagram, Paris, France	
16	Win	15–1	Robert Meunier	RTD	8 (8)	May 15, 1952	Salle Wagram, Paris, France	
15	Win	14–1	Robert Garcia	PTS	8	Apr 5, 1952	Salle Marcel Cerdan, Oran, Algeria	
14	Win	13–1	Felix Vanderdonck	TKO	4 (8)	Mar 17, 1952	Palais des Sports, Paris, France	
13	Win	12–1	Robert Lefuevre	PTS	8	Feb 25, 1952	Palais des Sports, Paris, France	
12	Win	11–1	Jean Binet	PTS	10	Feb 3, 1952	Palais de la Mutualité, Paris, France	
11	Win	10–1	Georges Lafage	PTS	6	Jan 19, 1952	Palais des Sports, Paris, France	
10	Win	9–1	Edmond Moletto	PTS	8	Jan 5, 1952	Paris Stadium, Paris, France	
9	Win	8–1	Lucien Gougelin	PTS	8	Dec 29, 1951	Élysée Montmartre, Paris, France	
8	Win	7–1	Michel Martin	TKO	8 (8)	Dec 16, 1951	Palais de la Mutualité, Paris, France	
7	Loss	6–1	Robert Meunier	PTS	8	Dec 2, 1951	Palais de la Mutualité, Paris, France	
6	Win	6–0	Sideki Yansanne	TKO	6 (6)	Nov 4, 1951	Metz, Moselle, France	
5	Win	5–0	Florent Druart	TKO	5 (6)	Oct 17, 1951	Central Sporting Club, Paris, France	
4	Win	4–0	Henri Pageot	KO	5 (6)	Oct 11, 1951	Salle Wagram, Paris, France	
3	Win	3–0	Emile Cordillot	PTS	6	Sep 26, 1951	Paris, France	
2	Win	2–0	Francis Pandocchi	PTS	6	Sep 20, 1951	Salle Wagram, Paris, France	
1	Win	1–0	Leon Gauche	TKO	2 (6)	Sep 12, 1951	Paris Central, Paris, France	

== Titles in boxing ==
=== Major world titles ===
- NYSAC bantamweight champion (118 lbs)
- NBA (WBA) bantamweight champion (118 lbs)

=== The Ring magazine titles ===
- The Ring bantamweight champion (118 lbs)

=== Regional/International titles ===
- France bantamweight champion (118 lbs)
- European bantamweight champion (118 lbs)

=== Undisputed titles ===
- Undisputed bantamweight champion

== See also ==
- List of bantamweight boxing champions
- List of select Jewish boxers

Achievements
Vacant Title last held by Jimmy Carruthers	World Bantamweight Champion; September 19, 1954 - June 29, 1956	Next: Mario D'Agata
Sporting positions
Previous: Jake LaMotta	Oldest Living World Champion; September 19, 2017 – March 2, 2022	Next: Harold Gomes
