= John Kelly (boxer) =

Northern Irish boxer (1932–2016)

Personal information
- Nationality: Irish/British
- Born: 17 January 1932 Belfast, Northern Ireland
- Died: 29 December 2016 (aged 84)
- Height: 5 ft 4 in (163 cm)
- Weight: Bantamweight, featherweight

Boxing career
- Stance: Southpaw

Boxing record
- Total fights: 28
- Wins: 24
- Win by KO: 14
- Losses: 4
Medal record
Silver medal – second place	1951 European Champs. – Milan	(bantamweight)

John Kelly (17 January 1932 – 29 December 2016) was a boxer from Northern Ireland who was Irish, British, and European bantamweight champion in the 1950s.

== Career ==
Born in Belfast, Kelly first had success as an amateur. He finished as runner-up in the Irish bantamweight final and went on to win a silver medal at the European Amateur Boxing Championships in Milan in May 1951.

He made his professional debut in December 1951 with a win over Peter Morrison. He had 13 fights in 1952, all of them wins, including a points victory over Hogan Bassey. He was still unbeaten by June 1953, when he faced Bunty Doran at the Ulster Hall, Belfast for the Irish bantamweight title and the BBBofC Northern Ireland Area title. Kelly stopped Doran in the eleventh round to take both titles.

His next fight came in October 1953, when he challenged for Peter Keenan's British and European titles at the King's Hall, Belfast. The fight went the full 15 rounds, with Kelly getting the decision. He beat Jean Kidy in November, before defending his European title in February 1954 against French champion Robert Cohen, the fight delayed by a month due to a shoulder injury to Cohen. Cohen knocked Kelly down five times in the second round, and after a further knockdown in the third, Kelly's corner threw in the towel.

Kelly was knocked out in the ninth round by Belgian champion Pierre Cossemyns in April 1954. In September he defended his British title against Keenan; Keenan knocked him out in the sixth round to regain the title.

Kelly moved up to featherweight and in March 1955 stopped Laurie McShane in the fourth round. He followed this in June with a points win over Aime Devisch, but in August was knocked out in the first round by Teddy Peckham.

Kelly returned in 1957 with an eighth round knockout of Teddy Barker, but this proved to be his final fight.

Kelly died on 29 December 2016, aged 84.
