= Davey Moore (boxer, born 1933) =

American boxer (1933–1963)

Davey S. Moore
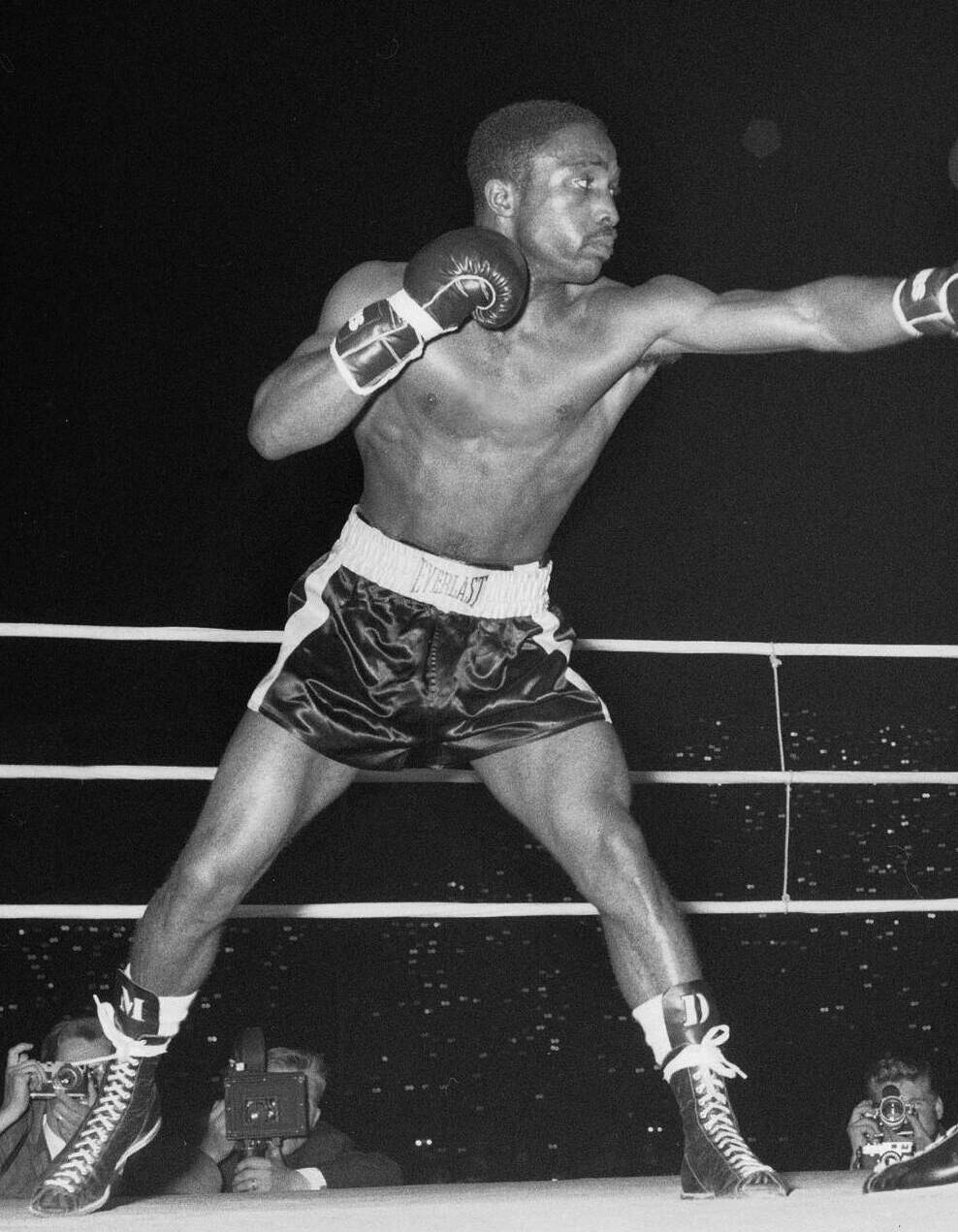
- Moore in 1962

Personal information
- Nickname: Springfield Rifle
- Born: David Schultz Moore; November 1, 1933 Lexington, Kentucky, U.S.
- Died: March 25, 1963 (aged 29) Los Angeles, California, U.S.
- Weight: Featherweight

Boxing career

Boxing record
- Total fights: 68
- Wins: 59
- Win by KO: 30
- Losses: 7
- Draws: 1
- No contests: 1

David Schultz "Davey" Moore (November 1, 1933 – March 25, 1963) was an American Undisputed Featherweight Champion boxer who fought professionally from 1953 to 1963. A resident of Springfield, Ohio, Moore was one of two world champions to share the name in the second half of the 20th century. The second, Davey Moore (born 1959), boxed during the 1980s.

Moore died on March 25, 1963, aged 29, as a result of injuries sustained in a match against Sugar Ramos.

== Career highlights ==
Moore first gained wide attention from his performance on the 1952 U.S. Olympic boxing team, as a bantamweight amateur.

Moore made his professional debut on May 11, 1953, aged 19, beating Willie Reece by a decision in six rounds. He boxed 8 times in 1953, with a total record that year of 6 wins, 1 loss and 1 no contest.

From the beginning of his career through 1956 Moore fought a total of 29 bouts, with a total record of 22–5–1, and 1 no contest. Beginning with his April 10, 1957 fight against Gil Cadilli, Moore had an 18-bout winning streak, ending when he lost to Carlos Morocho Hernández on March 14, 1960, with a TKO. It was during this period, on March 18, 1959, that Moore won the World Featherweight Title from Hogan "Kid" Bassey. Moore retained the title through the remainder of his career, defending it successfully 5 times, and losing it to Sugar Ramos on March 21, 1963.

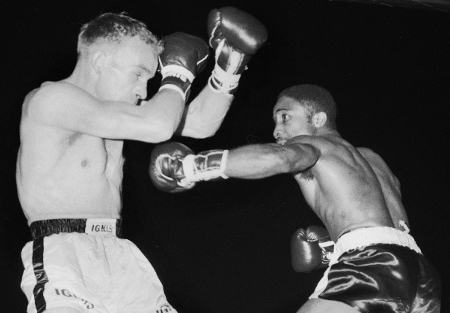
Moore (right) vs. Olli Mäki in 1962

== 1952 Olympic results ==
Below is the record of Davey Moore, an American bantamweight boxer who competed at the 1952 Helsinki Olympics:

- Round of 32: bye
- Round of 16: defeated Egon Schidan (West Germany) by decision, 3–0
- Quarterfinal: lost to Kang Joon-Ho (South Korea) by decision, 1–2

== Last fight and death ==
Moore was scheduled to face Cuban-Mexican Sugar Ramos in July 1962 at Dodger Stadium, but a torrential typhoon-like rainstorm hit Los Angeles on the night of the fight, so the fight was postponed until March 21, 1963. It was shown on national television in front of a crowd of 22,000. In the tenth round, Ramos staggered Moore with a left and then continued to pummel him with blows until he fell, striking the base of his neck on the bottom rope and injuring his brain stem.

Moore got to his feet for the eight-count and, despite Ramos' continuing attack, managed to finish the round on his feet, but the referee stopped the fight before the eleventh, and Ramos was declared the new World Featherweight Champion. Moore was able to give a clear-headed interview before he left the ring, but in the dressing room fell into a coma from which he never emerged. As Moore fought for life, Pope John XXIII made a statement calling the sport of boxing "barbaric", and "contrary to natural principles". Moore's condition deteriorated, and he died 75 hours after the fight on March 25 at 2:20 a.m. CST in White Memorial Hospital, Los Angeles. His body lay in state at a South Los Angeles funeral home on Tuesday, March 26 for 10 hours; over 10,000 people filed by to pay respects. He was buried in Ferncliff Cemetery in Springfield, Ohio.

== Legacy ==
Bob Dylan wrote a song about Davey Moore's death, posing the question of responsibility. It is titled "Who Killed Davey Moore?" and was also sung by Pete Seeger and Graeme Allwright (in French).

Phil Ochs wrote a song titled "Davey Moore" which told the story of Davey Moore's death and placed the guilt on the managers, the boxing "money men", boxing fans, as well as Davey Moore himself for having too much “pride” to quit the sport.

On September 21, 2013, the 50th anniversary of Moore's final fight, his hometown of Springfield, Ohio, dedicated an 8-foot-tall (2.44 m) bronze statue in his honor. Located in a public green space just south of downtown near his old neighborhood, the dedication attendees included Moore's widow Geraldine and Ultiminio "Sugar" Ramos, visiting from Mexico City.

Moore, played by John Bosco Jr., is featured as a character in the movie The Happiest Day in the Life of Olli Mäki that won the 'Prize Un Certain Regard' in the 2016 Cannes Film Festival.

== Professional boxing record ==
68 fights	59 wins	7 losses
By knockout	30	2
By decision	28	5
By disqualification	1	0
Draws	1	
No contests	1	

No.	Result	Record	Opponent	Type	Round, time	Date	Location	Notes
68	Loss	59–7–1 (1)	Sugar Ramos	RTD	10 (15), 3:00	Mar 21, 1963	Dodger Stadium, Los Angeles, California, U.S.	Lost WBA and The Ring featherweight titles; For inaugural WBC featherweight title; Moore dies two days later of a whiplash to his brain stem after his neck struck the bottom rope of a three-rope ring during this bout.
67	Win	59–6–1 (1)	Gil Cadilli	TKO	5 (10), 3:00	Feb 18, 1963	Civic Auditorium, San Jose, California, U.S.	
55	Win	58–6–1 (1)	Fili Nava	UD	10	Dec 11, 1962	Municipal Auditorium, San Antonio, Texas, U.S.	
65	Win	57–6–1 (1)	Olli Mäki	TKO	2 (15), 2:31	Aug 17, 1962	Helsinki Olympic Stadium, Helsinki, Finland	Retained NYSAC, NBA, and The Ring featherweight titles
64	Win	56–6–1 (1)	Mario Diaz	KO	2 (10), 1:21	Jul 9, 1962	Los Angeles, California, U.S.	
63	Win	55–6–1 (1)	Cisco Andrade	TKO	7 (10), 2:05	Mar 9, 1962	Olympic Auditorium, Los Angeles, California, U.S.	
62	Win	54–6–1 (1)	Kazuo Takayama	UD	15	Nov 13, 1961	Kokugikan, Tokyo, Japan	Retained NYSAC, NBA, and The Ring featherweight titles
61	Win	53–6–1 (1)	Felix Cervantes	KO	5 (10), 1:55	Oct 12, 1961	Olympic Auditorium, Los Angeles, California, U.S.	
60	Win	52–6–1 (1)	Kid Irapuato	TKO	6 (10)	Sep 19, 1961	Plaza de Toros, Ciudad Juarez, Chihuahua, Mexico	
59	Win	51–6–1 (1)	Felix Cervantes	UD	10	Jul 17, 1961	Campo de Softball, Mexicali, Baja California, Mexico	
58	Win	50–6–1 (1)	Gil Cadilli	UD	10	Jul 6, 1961	Convention Center, Las Vegas, Nevada, U.S.	
57	Win	49–6–1 (1)	Danny Valdez	KO	1 (15), 2:58	Apr 8, 1961	Olympic Auditorium, Los Angeles, California, U.S.	Retained NYSAC, NBA, and The Ring featherweight titles
56	Win	48–6–1 (1)	Ray Nobile	PTS	10	Feb 10, 1961	Palazzetto dello Sport, Rome, Italy	
55	Win	47–6–1 (1)	Fred Galiana	TKO	4 (10)	Jan 27, 1961	Palacio de los Deportes, Madrid, Spain	
54	Win	46–6–1 (1)	Gracieux Lamperti	PTS	10	Jan 9, 1961	Palais de Sports, Paris, France	
53	Win	45–6–1 (1)	Rudy Corona	KO	7 (10)	Dec 3, 1960	Ciudad Obregon, Sonora, Mexico	
52	Win	44–6–1 (1)	David Camacho	KO	8 (10)	Nov 27, 1960	Nogales, Sonora, Mexico	
51	Win	43–6–1 (1)	Kazuo Takayama	UD	15	Aug 29, 1960	Korakuen Baseball Stadium, Tokyo, Japan	Retained NYSAC, NBA, and The Ring featherweight titles
50	Win	42–6–1 (1)	Kid Irapuato	UD	10	Aug 1, 1960	Tijuana, Baja California, Mexico	
49	Win	41–6–1 (1)	Frank Valdez	TKO	6 (10), 1:48	Jul 20, 1960	Civic Auditorium, Albuquerque, New Mexico, U.S.	
48	Loss	40–6–1 (1)	Carlos Hernández	RTD	7 (10), 3:00	Mar 17, 1960	Nuevo Circo, Caracas, Venezuela	
47	Win	40–5–1 (1)	Sergio Caprari	TKO	8 (10)	Feb 22, 1960	Nuevo Circo, Caracas, Venezuela	
46	Win	39–5–1 (1)	Hilario Morales	UD	10	Dec 14, 1959	Civic Auditorium, San Francisco, California, U.S.	
45	Win	38–5–1 (1)	Bobby Neill	TKO	1 (10), 2:55	Oct 20, 1959	Empire Pool, Wembley, London, England	
44	Win	37–5–1 (1)	Hogan Bassey	RTD	11 (15)	Aug 19, 1959	Olympic Auditorium, Los Angeles, California, U.S.	Retained NYSAC, NBA, and The Ring featherweight titles
43	Win	36–5–1 (1)	Hogan Bassey	RTD	13 (15)	Mar 18, 1959	Olympic Auditorium, Los Angeles, California, U.S.	Won NYSAC, NBA, and The Ring featherweight titles
42	Win	35–5–1 (1)	Ricardo Moreno	KO	1 (10), 2:58	Dec 11, 1958	Olympic Auditorium, Los Angeles, California, U.S.	
41	Win	34–5–1 (1)	Kid Anahuac	UD	10	Sep 25, 1958	Olympic Auditorium, Los Angeles, California, U.S.	
40	Win	33–5–1 (1)	Kid Anahuac	SD	10	Jul 28, 1958	Plaza de Toros, Tijuana, Baja California, Mexico	
39	Win	32–5–1 (1)	Lauro Salas	UD	10	Jun 19, 1958	Olympic Auditorium, Los Angeles, California, U.S.	
38	Win	31–5–1 (1)	Roberto Garcia	UD	10	May 24, 1958	El Toreo de Cuatro Caminos, Mexico City, Mexico	
37	Win	30–5–1 (1)	Vince Delgado	KO	3 (10), 0:08	Mar 6, 1958	Olympic Auditorium, Los Angeles, California, U.S.	
36	Win	29–5–1 (1)	Fili Nava	UD	10	Feb 20, 1958	Olympic Auditorium, Los Angeles, California, U.S.	
35	Win	28–5–1 (1)	Victor Manuel Quijano	TKO	9 (10), 1:57	Jan 9, 1958	Olympic Auditorium, Los Angeles, California, U.S.	
34	Win	27–5–1 (1)	Jose Luis Cotero	UD	10	Nov 8, 1957	Capitol Arena, Washington, District of Columbia, U.S.	
33	Win	26–5–1 (1)	Victor Manuel Quijano	SD	10	Aug 14, 1957	War Memorial Auditorium, Syracuse, New York, U.S.	
32	Win	25–5–1 (1)	Isidro Martinez	UD	10	Jul 5, 1957	Capitol Arena, Washington, District of Columbia, U.S.	
31	Win	24–5–1 (1)	Buddy McDonald	UD	10	Jun 13, 1957	Interstate Fairgrounds, Spokane, Washington, U.S.	
30	Win	23–5–1 (1)	Gil Cadilli	UD	10	Apr 10, 1957	Biscayne Arena, Miami, Florida, U.S.	
29	Loss	22–5–1 (1)	Bobby Rogers	PTS	8	Nov 7, 1956	Chicago Stadium, Chicago, Illinois, U.S.	
28	Win	22–4–1 (1)	Jimmy DeMura	PTS	6	Oct 10, 1956	Chicago Stadium, Chicago, Illinois, U.S.	
27	Win	21–4–1 (1)	Charlie Slaughter	KO	4 (10), 0:48	Jun 5, 1956	Palais des Sports, Montreal, Quebec, Canada	
26	Win	20–4–1 (1)	Jimmy Hackney	DQ	6 (8), 1:34	Dec 16, 1955	Madison Square Garden, New York City, New York, U.S.	Hackney was disqualified on the sixth round for not trying his best.
25	Win	19–4–1 (1)	Nat Jackson	KO	2 (10)	Oct 17, 1955	Coliseum Arenac New Orleans, Louisiana, U.S.	
24	Win	18–4–1 (1)	Ray Riojas	UD	10	Sep 19, 1955	County Coliseum, El Paso, Texas, U.S.	
23	Loss	17–4–1 (1)	Santiago Martinez	PTS	10	Jul 16, 1955	Havana, Cuba	
22	Win	17–3–1 (1)	Pedro Tesis	PTS	10	May 15, 1955	Arena de Colon, Colon City, Colon, Panama	
21	Loss	16–3–1 (1)	Isidro Martinez	PTS	10	May 1, 1955	Arena de Colon, Colon City, Colon, Panama	
20	Win	16–2–1 (1)	John Barnes	UD	6	Jan 18, 1955	Motor City Arena, Detroit, Michigan, U.S.	
19	Win	15–2–1 (1)	Eddie Burgin	TKO	9 (12), 0:48	Dec 7, 1954	Music Hall Arena, Cincinnati, Ohio, U.S.	Won Ohio featherweight title
18	Win	14–2–1 (1)	Dick Armstrong	TKO	6 (10)	Oct 25, 1954	Gymnastic Club, Dayton, Ohio, U.S.	
17	Win	13–2–1 (1)	Herky Kaminsky	UD	10	Jun 29, 1954	Memorial Hall, Springfield, Ohio, U.S.	
16	Draw	12–2–1 (1)	Herky Kaminsky	PTS	10	May 18, 1954	Memorial Hall, Springfield, Ohio, U.S.	
15	Win	12–2 (1)	Charley Riley	MD	10	Apr 20, 1954	Kiel Auditorium, St Louis, Missouri, U.S.	
14	Win	11–2 (1)	Jack Ingram	KO	1 (10)	Apr 8, 1954	Memorial Hall, Springfield, Ohio, U.S.	
13	Win	10–2 (1)	Leo Carter	TKO	2 (6), 1:20	Apr 1, 1954	Music Hall Arena, Cincinnati, Ohio, U.S.	
12	Win	9–2 (1)	Bob Keeling	TKO	3 (6), 2:40	Mar 13, 1954	Music Hall Arena, Cincinnati, Ohio, U.S.	
11	Loss	8–2 (1)	Jackie Blair	UD	10	Feb 4, 1954	Armory, Akron, Ohio, U.S.	
10	Win	8–1 (1)	Eddie Crawford	TKO	2 (6)	Jan 5, 1954	Memorial Hall, Columbus, Ohio, U.S.	
9	Win	7–1 (1)	Eddie Cooper	KO	3 (8), 1:18	Nov 20, 1953	Gymnastic Club, Dayton, Ohio, U.S.	
8	NC	6–1 (1)	Raul Prado	NC	3 (8)	Oct 22, 1953	Grand Rapids Stadium, Grand Rapids, Michigan, U.S.	
7	Loss	6–1	Russell Tague	PTS	6	Oct 3, 1953	Rainbo Arena, Chicago, Illinois, U.S.	
6	Win	6–0	Ed Hughes	KO	4 (5)	Aug 29, 1953	Rainbo Arena, Chicago, Illinois, U.S.	
5	Win	5–0	Eddie Gonzales	KO	1	Jul 10, 1953	Fort Williams, Kentucky, U.S.	
4	Win	4–0	Dick Armstrong	TKO	4 (6), 2:40	Jun 15, 1953	Municipal Stadium, Portsmouth, Ohio, U.S.	
3	Win	3–0	Terry Book	PTS	6	Jun 1, 1953	Rainbo Arena, Chicago, Illinois, U.S.	
2	Win	2–0	Ralph Capone	PTS	4	May 25, 1953	Rainbo Arena, Chicago, Illinois, U.S.	
1	Win	1–0	Willie Reece	UD	6	May 11, 1953	Municipal Stadium, Portsmouth, Ohio, U.S.	

== Titles in boxing ==
=== Major world titles ===
- NYSAC featherweight champion (126 lbs)
- NBA (WBA) featherweight champion (Note: The NBA was renamed the WBA at the end of his reign.) (126 lbs)

=== The Ring magazine titles ===
- The Ring featherweight champion (126 lbs)

=== Regional/International titles ===
- Ohio featherweight champion (126 lbs)

=== Undisputed titles ===
- Undisputed featherweight champion

== See also ==
- Lineal championship

== Notes and references ==
=== References ===
Achievements
Preceded by Hogan Bassey	World Featherweight Champion; March 18, 1959 – March 21, 1961	Succeeded by Ultiminio "Sugar" Ramos

Sporting positions
World boxing titles
Preceded by Hogan Bassey	NYSAC featherweight champion March 18, 1959 – March 21, 1963	Succeeded by Sugar Ramos
Preceded by Hogan Bassey	NBA featherweight champion March 18, 1959 – March 21, 1963	Succeeded by Sugar Ramos
Preceded by Hogan Bassey	The Ring featherweight champion March 18, 1959 – March 21, 1963	Succeeded by Sugar Ramos
Preceded by Hogan Bassey	Undisputed featherweight champion March 18, 1959 – March 21, 1963	Succeeded by Sugar Ramos
