= Cherif Hamia =

Algerian boxer (1931–1991)

Personal information
- Nationality: Algerian
- Born: Cherif Hamia; 23 March 1931 (age 95) Guergou, Algeria
- Died: 24 June 1991 (aged 60)
- Weight: Featherweight

Boxing career
- Stance: Orthodox

Boxing record
- Total fights: 38
- Wins: 33
- Win by KO: 15
- Losses: 3
- Draws: 2
- No contests: 0

Cherif Hamia (23 March 1931 – 24 June 1991) was an Algerian boxer and the European Featherweight Champion.

== Amateur career ==
Cherif Hamia was a successful amateur boxer. In May 1953 he started for France in the European Championship of Amateur Boxing in Warsaw. In featherweight, he won it in the second round on Burkhard Schröter from the GDR to points (3: 0 RS). In the quarter final he met Józef Kruza from Poland, where he was defeated on points (1: 2 RS). Hamia finished in 5th place.

Subsequently, he was appointed to a Europe XI that played two test fights in the United States. On 16 June 1953 in Chicago he defeated the "Golden Gloves champion", Chicago Dick Martinez and on 23 June 1953 in St. Louis the "Golden Gloves champion" of St. Louis, Bo Tenequer.

== Professional career ==
By the fall of 1953 Cherif Hamia was a professional boxer. He trained in Paris and belonged to the "box-stall" by Philippe Filippi, who was his manager, coaches and trainers at the same time. His first fight he achieved a knockout victory in the 1st round over fellow debutant Jean Demeurs. He won his next 13 fights, all taking place in Paris or Algiers. On 22 November 1954 he boxed in Paris against Jacques Dumesnil to become French Featherweight Champion.

His first defeat as a professional boxer occurred on 10 December 1954 in Algiers, when he was caught by the Belgian featherweight champion Louis Cabo in the 1st round by knockout, however this did not stop a continued trend of victories. On 27 June 1955 he defended his French featherweight title with a knockout victory in the 5th round of Mohammed Chickaoui. On 26 September 1955, he beat the German featherweight champion Rudi Langer on points. On 11 December 1955, he defeated fellow French Algerian Robert Cohen. On 26 January 1956, Cherif Hamia fought in Paris against the Belgian former European champion Jean Sneyers, with the match ending a draw.

He and his manager sought a world championship fight, he went to the United States and on 30 March 1956 Cherif Hamia defeated Carmelo Costa after 10 rounds on points. On 4 May 1956, he defeated Ike Chestnut in Washington and on 15 June 1956 in New York he defeated Puerto Rican Miguel Berrios. With these victories, he had the right to challenge the reigning featherweight champion Sandy Saddler. However, this fight did not materialize in 1956 and the end of 1956 Sandy Saddler retired.

On 21 January 1957, Cherif Hamia won in Paris with a points victory after 15 rounds over Jean Sneyers for the vacant European Featherweight title. On 24 June 1957 he was in Paris at last, to fight for the world title at featherweight, which was vacant after the retirement of Sandy Saddler. His opponent was Nigerian Hogan Bassey. In the early rounds Hamia dominated the fight and sent Bassey down in the 2nd round. However, in the 10th round referee Rene Schemann stopped the fight and Hogan "Kid" Bassey was proclaimed as the new champion by TKO.

Cherif Hamia continued his career and won the next three bouts. On 15 October 1959, he lost in Brussels against the Belgian Pierre Cossemyns and retired.
