= Mario D'Agata =

Italian boxer

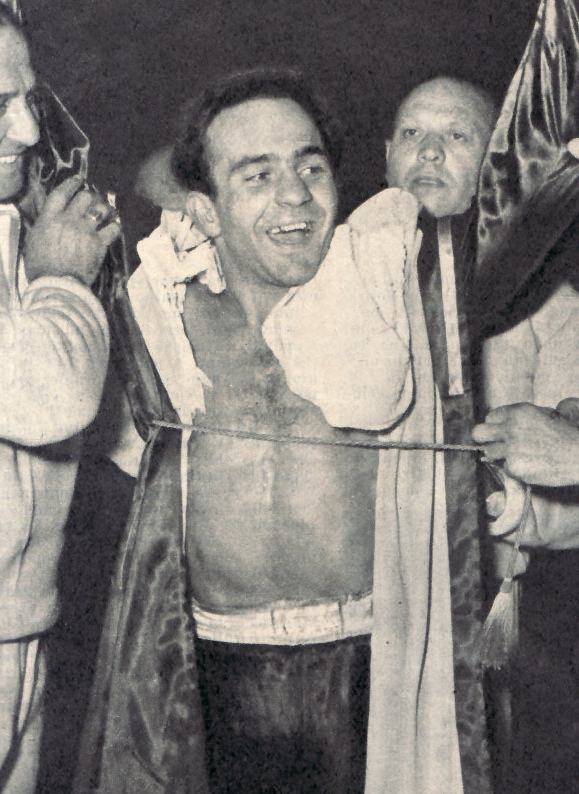
- Mario D'Agata c. 1955

Personal information
- Nationality: Italy
- Born: 29 May 1926 Arezzo, Italy
- Died: 4 April 2009 (aged 82) Florence, Italy
- Height: 1.57 m (5 ft 2 in)
- Weight: Bantamweight

Boxing career
- Stance: Orthodox

Boxing record
- Total fights: 67
- Wins: 54
- Win by KO: 22
- Losses: 10
- Draws: 3

Mario D'Agata (29 May 1926 – 4 April 2009) was an Italian professional boxer, who was the first, and so far only, deaf world champion in boxing. He was a lineal, European, and Italian bantamweight champion.

== Early life ==
D'Agata was born on 29 May 1926, in Arezzo, Italy. He had a tough childhood as a consequence of his disabilities, the victim of taunting from fellow school children. Feeling the need to prove himself equal, he resorted to street fighting as a way to demonstrate his equality. D'Agata was one of three children (out of seven) to be born deaf in his family. His parents moved him from Tuscany to Rome at an early age, hoping to find doctors who would cure him.

One afternoon he noticed a poster of a boxer adorning the door to a boxing gym. Upon entering he was enamored with how the boxers practiced their fighting in a polished, stylized way. D'Agata was drawn into boxing from that moment on. Due to the outbreak of the Second World War, however, D'Agata had to wait until he was 20 years old to fight as an amateur. In 1946, he began an amateur career that saw him win 90 out of 110 bouts.

== Professional career ==
On 14 October 1950, D'Agata turned professional, defeating Giuseppe Saladari by a decision in six rounds. He built a record of 10–0 with 1 knockout before suffering his first loss, at the hands of Romolo Re, 2 August 1951, by a decision in ten. Another loss to Re would follow, but D'Agata was able to build a 19–3–2 record with 4 knockouts before challenging for the Italian bantamweight title, on 26 September 1953, beating Gianni Zuddas by a disqualification in round nine to claim the belt. After five more wins, he travelled to Tunisia, where he met the future world champion Robert Cohen, losing a ten-round decision. After two more wins, he embarked on what would have been a long tour of Australia, a trip cut short after three wins when he was shot by his associate.

D'Agata then returned to Italy, where he was no longer recognized as champion. On 25 May 1955, he defeated Arthur Emboule by decision in eight rounds, in his first bout after the shooting. After eight more wins in a row (which raised his winning streak to a total of thirteen wins in a row), he was given a shot at the European bantamweight title by Andre Valignat on 29 October of the same year, and he defeated Valignat by a fifth round disqualification.

On 29 June 1956, D'Agata finally received his world title opportunity, when former conqueror Cohen gave him a chance to win the world bantamweight title in Rome. D'Agata made his dream come true by knocking Cohen out in six rounds in front of 38,000 fans, many of whom rushed to the ring the moment the fight was over, carrying D'Agata out of the ring on their arms. With that win, D'Agata made history as the first deaf world champion of boxing.

D'Agata went to Paris to defend his title for the first time, on 1 April 1957, against local challenger Alphonse Halimi. Special lights had been set specially for this fight, so that D'Agata, who could not hear the bell after each round, would be able to tell when each round was finished. These lights would flash the moment the bell rang. There was a storm on the day of the fight, which was held in an open-air area. Lightning struck one of the special lights in round three, and D'Agata was struck by sparkles, suffering a burned neck and back. It was decided the fight would go on, and D'Agata tried to defy the odds for the remaining of the fight, but he lost the title by a fifteen-round decision.

D'Agata never received a rematch from Halimi. He then fought on with mixed success, until 1 August 1962, when he announced his retirement. He was able to stay away from boxing for the rest of his life.

== Legacy ==
D'Agata became an example to many in his native Italy, where some boxing fans still regard him as a hero. In addition to enduring disabilities, he also survived an attempt on his life before becoming a world champion, after being shot in the chest by a business partner in Australia, on 12 February 1955. This cost him a shot at the world bantamweight title, at the time held by Raul Macias.

== Professional boxing record ==
67 fights	54 wins	10 losses
By knockout	22	1
By decision	27	8
By disqualification	5	1
Draws	3	

No.	Result	Record	Opponent	Type	Round,time	Date	Age	Location	Notes
67	Loss	54–10–3	Federico Scarponi	PTS	12	Jul 19, 1962	36 years, 51 days	Roma, Italy	For vacant Italy bantamweight title
66	Win	54–9–3	Andre Gasperini	PTS	8	Mar 27, 1962	35 years, 302 days	PalaLido, Milan, Italy	
65	Win	53–9–3	Ugo Milan	TKO	6 (8)	Jan 19, 1962	35 years, 235 days	Palazzetto dello Sport, Roma, Italy	
64	Win	52–9–3	Francisco Carreno	PTS	8	Nov 24, 1961	35 years, 179 days	Palazzetto dello Sport, Roma, Italy	
63	Win	51–9–3	Lazaro ben Layachi	KO	6 (8)	Oct 27, 1961	35 years, 151 days	Palazzetto dello Sport, Roma, Italy	
62	Loss	50–9–3	Jackie Brown	PTS	10	Jun 9, 1960	34 years, 11 days	Firhill Park, Glasgow, Scotland	
61	Loss	50–8–3	Freddie Gilroy	PTS	10	Sep 15, 1959	33 years, 109 days	Empire Pool, Wembley, London, England	
60	Loss	50–7–3	José Becerra	RTD	10 (12)	Feb 5, 1959	32 years, 252 days	Olympic Auditorium, Los Angeles, California, U.S.	
59	Loss	50–6–3	Piero Rollo	PTS	15	Oct 12, 1958	32 years, 136 days	Stadio Amsicora, Cagliari, Italy	Lost EBU and Italy bantamweight titles
58	Win	50–5–3	Mimoun Ben Ali	PTS	10	Sep 13, 1958	32 years, 107 days	Cagliari, Italy	
57	Win	49–5–3	Michel Lamora	KO	4 (10)	Feb 13, 1958	31 years, 260 days	Napoli, Italy	
56	Win	48–5–3	Roger Cappato	PTS	10	Dec 26, 1957	31 years, 211 days	Palazzo dello Sport (Pad. 3 Fiera), Milan, Italy	
55	Win	47–5–3	Jean Renard	KO	7 (10)	Dec 10, 1957	31 years, 195 days	Teatro Duse, Bergamo, Italy	
54	Win	46–5–3	Federico Scarponi	KO	8 (15), 2:30	Oct 27, 1957	31 years, 151 days	Stadio Amsicora, Cagliari, Italy	Won vacant EBU bantamweight title
53	Win	45–5–3	Roland Roy	TKO	7 (10)	Jun 28, 1957	31 years, 30 days	Cornigliano Stadio del Littorio, Genoa, Italy	
52	Loss	44–5–3	Alphonse Halimi	PTS	15	Apr 1, 1957	30 years, 307 days	Palais des Sports, Paris, France	Lost NYSAC and The Ring bantamweight titles
51	Draw	44–4–3	Robert Tartari	PTS	10	Dec 8, 1956	30 years, 193 days	Palais des Expositions, Geneva, Switzerland	
50	Win	44–4–2	Juan Cardenas	PTS	10	Oct 27, 1956	30 years, 151 days	Palazzo dello Sport (Pad. 3 Fiera), Milan, Italy	
49	Win	43–4–2	Robert Cohen	TKO	7 (15)	Jun 29, 1956	30 years, 31 days	Stadio Olimpico, Roma, Italy	Won NYSAC and The Ring bantamweight titles
48	Win	42–4–2	Jesus Lucas Rubio	PTS	10	May 18, 1956	29 years, 355 days	Palazzo del Ghiaccio, Milan, Italy	
47	Win	41–4–2	Jesus Lucas Rubio	PTS	10	Mar 21, 1956	29 years, 297 days	Teatro Mariani, Ravenna, Italy	
46	Win	40–4–2	Little Cezar	SD	10	Jan 21, 1956	29 years, 237 days	Rizal Memorial Sports Complex, Manila, Philippines	
45	Win	39–4–2	Andre Valignat	DQ	5 (15), 2:02	Oct 29, 1955	29 years, 153 days	Palazzo dello Sport (Pad. 3 Fiera), Milan, Italy	Won vacant EBU bantamweight title
44	Win	38–4–2	Jean Kidy	RTD	5 (10)	Oct 15, 1955	29 years, 139 days	Palazzo del Ghiaccio, Milan, Italy	
43	Win	37–4–2	Pedro Paris	KO	3 (10)	Sep 15, 1955	29 years, 109 days	Bologna, Italy	
42	Win	36–4–2	Jose Luis Martinez	KO	8 (10)	Aug 18, 1955	29 years, 81 days	Messina, Italy	
41	Win	35–4–2	Mohamed Farid	TKO	4 (10), 1:45	Aug 9, 1955	29 years, 72 days	Arena Flegrea, Napoli, Italy	
40	Win	34–4–2	Jose Crespo	KO	5 (10)	Jul 30, 1955	29 years, 62 days	Bari, Italy	
39	Win	33–4–2	Henri Schmid	PTS	10	Jul 21, 1955	29 years, 53 days	Prato, Italy	
38	Win	32–4–2	Robert Meunier	PTS	10	Jun 28, 1955	29 years, 30 days	Palazzetto dello Sport, Roma, Italy	
37	Win	31–4–2	Assane Fakyh	RTD	4 (10)	Jun 13, 1955	29 years, 15 days	Livorno, Italy	
36	Win	30–4–2	Arthur Emboule	RTD	8 (10)	May 25, 1955	28 years, 361 days	Stadio di Torino-Esposizioni, Torino, Italy	
35	Win	29–4–2	Billy Peacock	PTS	12	Dec 10, 1954	28 years, 195 days	West Melbourne Stadium, Victoria, Melbourne	
34	Win	28–4–2	Bobby Sinn	PTS	12	Nov 19, 1954	28 years, 174 days	West Melbourne Stadium, Victoria Melbourne	
33	Win	27–4–2	Alex Bollaert	TKO	5 (10)	Oct 1, 1954	28 years, 125 days	Palazzo del Ghiaccio, Milan, Italy	
32	Win	26–4–2	Andre Valignat	PTS	10	Jul 31, 1954	28 years, 63 days	Arezzo, Italy	
31	Win	25–4–2	Emile Chemama	PTS	10	Jun 12, 1954	28 years, 14 days	Stade de la Pépinière, Tunis, Tunisia	
30	Loss	24–4–2	Robert Cohen	UD	10	May 15, 1954	27 years, 351 days	Stade de la Pépinière, Tunis, Tunisia	
29	Win	24–3–2	Kid Andre	TKO	10 (10)	Apr 30, 1954	27 years, 336 days	Palazzo del Ghiaccio, Milan, Italy	
28	Win	23–3–2	Giovanni Zuddas	PTS	12	Apr 10, 1954	27 years, 316 days	Palazzo del Ghiaccio, Milan, Italy	Retained Italy bantamweight title
27	Win	22–3–2	Luigi Fasulo	RTD	4 (12)	Jan 23, 1954	27 years, 239 days	Napoli, Italy	Retained Italy bantamweight title
26	Draw	21–3–2	Andre Valignat	PTS	10	Nov 15, 1953	27 years, 170 days	Palais de la Mutualité, Paris, France	
25	Win	21–3–1	Pierre Gress Gyde	TKO	6 (10)	Oct 30, 1953	27 years, 154 days	Pavillon des Sports, Geneva, Switzerland	
24	Win	20–3–1	Giovanni Zuddas	DQ	9 (12)	Sep 26, 1953	27 years, 120 days	Teatro Politeama Universale, Arezzo, Italy	Won vacant Italy bantamweight title
23	Win	19–3–1	Arthur Emboule	PTS	10	Jul 6, 1953	27 years, 38 days	Arezzo, Italy	
22	Win	18–3–1	Edmond Moletto	PTS	10	Mar 30, 1953	26 years, 305 days	Arezzo, Italy	
21	Win	17–3–1	Jacques Louni	PTS	10	Jan 15, 1953	26 years, 231 days	Teatro Politeama Universale, Arezzo, Italy	
20	Win	16–3–1	Giuseppe D'Augusta	PTS	10	Dec 26, 1952	26 years, 211 days	Milan, Italy	
19	Win	15–3–1	Gaetano Annaloro	DQ	7 (8)	Nov 26, 1952	26 years, 181 days	Teatro Nazionale, Milan, Italy	
18	Win	14–3–1	Rino Stiaccini	PTS	6	Nov 7, 1952	26 years, 162 days	Florence, Italy	
17	Win	13–3–1	Enzo Ganadu	RTD	3 (10)	Jun 11, 1952	26 years, 13 days	Milan, Italy	
16	Loss	12–3–1	Renato Denti	DQ	5 (10)	May 17, 1952	25 years, 354 days	Florence, Italy	
15	Win	12–2–1	Giuliano Catini	TKO	2 (10)	Feb 20, 1952	25 years, 267 days	Florence, Italy	
14	Loss	11–2–1	Kid Arcelli	PTS	10	Dec 28, 1951	25 years, 213 days	Siena, Italy	
13	Win	11–1–1	Luigi Fasulo	TKO	3 (10)	Nov 30, 1951	25 years, 185 days	Arezzo, Italy	
12	Draw	10–1–1	Giuseppe D'Augusta	PTS	8	Sep 29, 1951	25 years, 123 days	Catania, Italy	
11	Loss	10–1	Kid Arcelli	PTS	10	Aug 2, 1951	25 years, 65 days	Florence, Italy	
10	Win	10–0	Arturo Paoletti	DQ	7 (10)	Jun 22, 1951	25 years, 24 days	Arezzo, Italy	
9	Win	9–0	Tino Cardinale	PTS	8	May 31, 1951	25 years, 2 days	Florence, Italy	
8	Win	8–0	Benito Giovanni Fattori	PTS	8	May 2, 1951	24 years, 338 days	Arezzo, Italy	
7	Win	7–0	Arturo Peratici	PTS	8	Feb 28, 1951	24 years, 275 days	Arezzo, Italy	
6	Win	6–0	Giovanni Capobianchi	PTS	8	Jan 31, 1951	24 years, 247 days	Cinema Teatro Goldoni, Florence, Italy	
5	Win	5–0	Pietro Cesarini	DQ	2 (8)	Jan 12, 1951	24 years, 228 days	Cinema Teatro Pucci, San Giovanni Valdarno, Italy	
4	Win	4–0	Gaudenzio Carutti	TKO	4 (6)	Dec 16, 1950	24 years, 201 days	Montevarchi, Italy	
3	Win	3–0	Settimio Marabitti	PTS	6	Nov 4, 1950	24 years, 159 days	Roma, Italy	
2	Win	2–0	Settimio Marabitti	PTS	6	Oct 28, 1950	24 years, 152 days	Arezzo, Italy	
1	Win	1–0	Giuseppe Salardi	PTS	6	Oct 14, 1950	24 years, 138 days	Siena, Italy	

== See also ==
- List of European Boxing Union bantamweight champions
- Ramon Nery - another deaf professional boxer

Sporting positions
Regional boxing titles
Preceded by Giovanni Zuddas	Italian bantamweight champion 26 September 1953 – 7 April 1955	Vacant Title next held by Piero Rollo
Vacant Title last held by Robert Cohen	European bantamweight champion 27 October 1957 – 12 October 1958	Succeeded by Piero Rollo
Major world boxing titles
Preceded by Robert Cohen	Lineal bantamweight champion 29 June 1956 - 1 April 1957	Succeeded by Alphonse Halimi
