= Alphonse Halimi =

French boxer (1932-2006)

Personal information
- Nickname: la Petite Terreur
- Nationality: (France) French
- Born: 18 February 1932 Constantine, Algeria
- Died: 12 November 2006 (aged 74) Paris, France
- Height: 5 ft 3 in (1.60 m)
- Weight: Bantamweight

Boxing career
- Reach: 5 ft 6 in (1.68 m)
- Stance: Orthodox

Boxing record
- Total fights: 51
- Wins: 42
- Win by KO: 21
- Losses: 8
- Draws: 1
- No contests: 0

Alphonse Halimi (February 18, 1932 – November 12, 2006) was a French boxer. He took the Undisputed World Bantamweight Championship on April 1, 1957, in Paris, and the European Bantamweight Championship five years later.

== Early life ==
He was born in Constantine, Algeria, to an Orthodox Jewish family. He was the last of 13 children, only seven of whom reached adulthood. His father was a postal inspector. At the age of 10, he ran away from home for the first time, living for long periods of time on the streets of a nation torn by war. A tailor named Dianoux, of Algiers, took Halimi under his wing and trained him to work as a tailor by the age of 12.

After he was caught in a fight on the streets of Algiers, Dianoux encouraged him to train at the Mouloudia gymnasium. Halimi was an excellent swimmer, but he chose boxing as his calling. He was Jewish, and sewed a star of David on his red and green (the Mouloudia colors) training shorts. Halimi's hero was the Algerian-born Marcel Cerdan, and he would carry a photo of his idol at the bottom of his suitcase throughout his career.

== Boxing career ==
He won more than 100 matches before being noticed by a trainer and being asked to come to France. Halimi began to box as an amateur at age sixteen, and knew that he could expand on his amateur credentials while in the military. At the age of 21, he won the first recognition for his abilities, capturing the French bantamweight amateur title in 1953 and 1954, and won the all-Mediterranean title in 1955.

American Billy Peacock fell to Halimi in Paris on March 16, 1956, in a close, strategically fought, ten round points decision. In an important win, Halimi showed dominance in the first and ninth rounds, though the rest appeared even. The Parisian crowd were not pleased with the pace of the bout, as both boxers cautiously circled, jabbed, and repeatedly clinched.

=== Taking the World Bantamweight Championship, 1957 ===
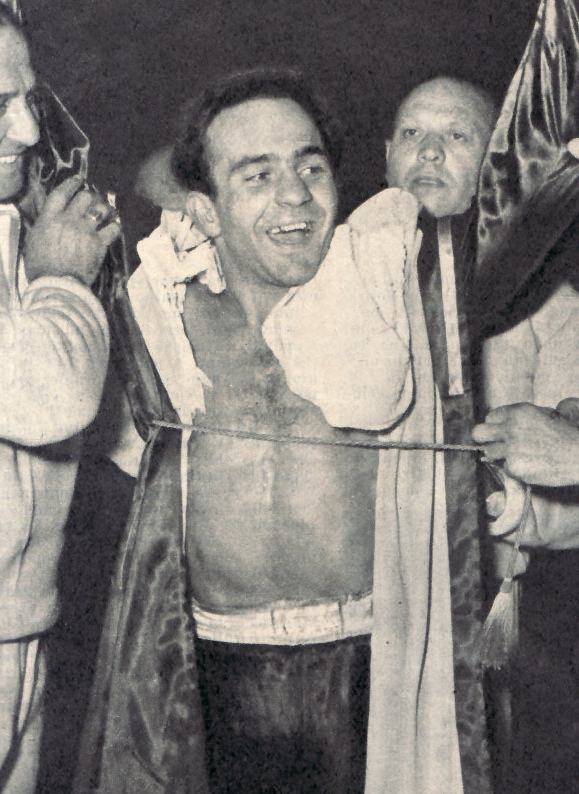
Mario D'Agata in 1955

On April 1, 1957, at the Vélodrome d'hiver in Paris, Halimi became world bantamweight champion by defeating the Italian deaf-mute boxer Mario d'Agata in a fifteen-round decision. The partisan Parisian crowd of 17,000 watched Halimi take eleven of the fifteen rounds, while D'Agata managed to win only two. It was D'Agata's first title defense. The bout had no knockdowns, but clinches were common, and the referee frequently had to pull the contestants apart. Special lights had been set for the fight, to allow d'Agata, who could not hear the bell, to know when each round ended or began. When the bell rang, the lights flashed. There was a storm on the day of the fight, and lightning struck one of the signal lights in round three. d'Agata was struck by sparks, suffering a burned neck and back, but the bout continued.

On November 6, 1957, Halimi faced Raul Macias in his second title bout at Los Angeles' Wrigley Field. Halimi shook Macias with a hook to the jaw in the furious fourth round, though the bout featured no knockdowns. Macias lost his NBA World Bantamweight title by a close and controversial 15-round split decision. Macias tried to close stronger in the final round, but was stopped by Halimi's offense.

In his next bout on December 8, 1957, he defeated Tanny Campo in a non-title match before 5,000 jeering fans in Marseille, France. The pace of the bout was slow, until the sixth when Halimi landed two hard left hooks to the body of Campo. The pace of the ten round bout displeased the French crowd, but Halimi won the close decision.

Halimi defeated Peter Keenan in a ten-round points decision in Paris on November 17, 1958. In the only knockdown, Halimi floored Keenan with a right to the jaw in the seventh. Halimi took a comfortable lead after the second round. Keenan was booed by the crowd of 10,000 for frequently backing away from his opponent.

He defended his title against José Becerra on July 8, 1959, before a screaming crowd of 15,000 at the Los Angeles Sports Arena. Midway through the eighth, Becerra trapped Halimi on the ropes and dropped him with a devastating left hook to the jaw. When he arose, he was met with a flurry of punches that dropped him for the full count and took his crown.

Louis Poncy fell to Halimi in an easy ten round points decision in Paris on April 11, 1960. Poncy, who held a five-pound weight advantage, was the former French Flyweight title holder.

He knocked out Spanish Bantamweight Champion Juan Cardenas, bringing victory in the third round in Algiers on July 2, 1960.

On October 25, 1960, Halimi defeated Irishman Freddie Gilroy, defending his World Bantamweight Championship in a controversial fifteen round points decision. Gilroy, the reigning European and British bantamweight champion, was the favorite of the partisan British crowd. Halimi scored the bout's only real knockdown with a short right hook in the thirteenth round for a count of four. Halimi slipped once to the mat in the seventh without taking a count. He later noted it was one of his best fights. He lost the title one year later on May 30, 1961, to Johnny Caldwell. Caldwell capped his twenty-second straight win with the victory. Early in the eighth, the crowd of 15,000 watched Caldwell take the lead after leaving a nagging cut over Halimi's eye. In the only knockdown, Caldwell floored Halimi for an eight count in the fifteenth.

=== Taking the European Bantamweight Championship, 1961 ===
On March 5, 1961, he knocked out Belgian Jean Renard in the fourth round in a stunning win in Tunesia. Halimi sent Renard to the canvas five times before he was finally counted out.

Though he was adored in France and his native Algeria, his personal life included questionable friendships, addictive betting, and separation from his wife.

He regained the European Bantamweight Title on June 26, 1962, defeating Piero Rollo in Tel Aviv. It was the first professional boxing match organized in Israel. Halimi, who wore the Star of David on his trunks, was cheered by the Israeli crowd of 15,000 through all fifteen rounds. After a cut in the first, Rollo had trouble getting inside, taking a defensive posture, except for the last two rounds when he made a desperate, but futile attempt at the decision. In a rematch for the title four months later, Halimi lost in a fifteen-round decision.

== Titles in boxing ==
=== Major world titles ===
- NYSAC bantamweight champion (118 lbs)
- NBA (WBA) bantamweight champion (118 lbs)

=== The Ring magazine titles ===
- The Ring bantamweight champion (118 lbs)

=== Regional/International titles ===
- European bantamweight champion (118 lbs)

=== Undisputed titles ===
- Undisputed bantamweight champion

== Retirement and death ==
In the 1960s, he settled at Vincennes and owned a café on the Avenue du Château. He later worked as a trainer for the l'Institut National des Sports, and became a swimming teacher in Vichy and Meudon.

Suffering from Alzheimer's disease near the end of his life, he resided at a retirement home in Saint-Ouen. He died on November 12, 2006, from pneumonia, and was interred at the Parisian cemetery of Pantin on November 14.

== Honors ==
- Halimi was awarded the Légion d'honneur by Charles de Gaulle.
- Halimi, who was Jewish, was inducted into the International Jewish Sports Hall of Fame in 1989. Time wrote of him: "Alphonse went to work with a street fighter's will. A grown-up guttersnipe from the back alleys of Algeria. He worked like a heavyweight, swung looping haymakers, careless of where they landed, confident that they hurt."

== See also ==
- List of select Jewish boxers

Achievements
Preceded by Mario D'Agata	World Bantamweight Champion; 1957–1959	Succeeded by Jose Becerra
