= Tommy Proffitt =

English boxer (1927–2023)

Personal information
- Nationality: British (English)
- Born: 13 July 1927; Ashton-under-Lyne, England
- Died: 23 March 2023 (aged 95)

Sport
- Sport: boxing

Thomas Proffitt (13 July 1927 – 23 March 2023) was an English boxer who competed for Great Britain in the 1948 Summer Olympics.

== Boxing career ==
Proffitt competed in the bantamweight division at the 1948 Olympic Games, losing in the round of 32.

=== 1948 Olympic results ===
- Round of 32: lost to Edel Ojeda (Mexico) by decision

Proffitt won the 1948 Amateur Boxing Association British bantamweight title, when boxing out of the LNER ABC.
