= Billy Kelly (boxer) =

Irish boxer (1932–2010)

Personal information
- Nickname: Spider
- Born: William Kelly; 21 April 1932 Derry, Northern Ireland
- Died: 7 May 2010 (aged 78) Derry, Northern Ireland
- Weight: Featherweight

Boxing career

Boxing record
- Total fights: 84
- Wins: 56
- Win by KO: 15
- Losses: 24
- Draws: 4

Billy "Spider" Kelly (21 April 1932 – 7 May 2010) was a boxer from Derry, Northern Ireland whose career highlight was winning the Commonwealth (British Empire) featherweight title in 1954. He went on to win the British featherweight title in 1955.

== History ==
Billy Kelly was born 21 April 1932 in Derry, Northern Ireland. He was the eldest of ten children of Jimmy Kelly, boxer and taxi driver, and his wife Kathleen. Billy Kelly was educated at Long Tower primary school.

Billy started his professional career in 1950, at the age of 18. On 2 October 1954, Kelly won the Commonwealth featherweight title, by out-pointing Roy Ankrah over 15 rounds. On 22 January 1955, Kelly received the British Featherweight title, by out-pointing Sammy McCarthy.

Kelly continued to box until 1962 and finished with a career record of 56 wins, 24 defeats and four draws from 84 professional bouts.

Billy 'Spider' Kelly died on 7 May 2010, at the age of 78.

On 15 August 2014, the city of Derry honoured Billy Kelly and his father by unveiling a plaque, which was dedicated to the memory of the boxers.
