= Puerto Rico at the 1948 Summer Olympics =

- IOC code: PUR
- NOC: Puerto Rico Olympic Committee

in London
- Competitors: 9 (9 men, 0 women) in 3 sports
- Flag bearer: José 'Fofó' Vicente
- Medals Ranked 34th: Gold 0 Silver 0 Bronze 1 Total 1

Summer Olympics appearances (overview)
- 1948; 1952; 1956; 1960; 1964; 1968; 1972; 1976; 1980; 1984; 1988; 1992; 1996; 2000; 2004; 2008; 2012; 2016; 2020; 2024

Puerto Rico competed in the Summer Olympic Games for the first time at the 1948 Summer Olympics in London, Great Britain. Nine competitors, all men, took part in eight events in three sports.

== History ==
The first Olympic participation took place at London 1948. Prior to the games, the topic of which flag was to be used was contentious. Despite being tasked with reorganizing the Puerto Rico Olympic Committee, Julio Enrique Monagas opposed the participation of Puerto Rico in the games at first. However, his work in the games, which included mingling with representatives of other countries, would be praised afterwards. After participating under the United States flag favored by the colonial government at the 1946 Central American and Caribbean Games, a new flag bearing the Coat of Arms was used in 1948. Since the American delegation was already present in the event, duplicity was to be avoided. However, at London bearer Miguel A. Barasorda demanded that he was allowed to exhibit the flag of Puerto Rico, with Monagas claiming that Luis Muñiz Marín had banned its use. This led to José Vicente becoming the last moment replacement.

On 16 July 1947, Monagas made his ignorance of IOC practices obvious when he sent a letter admitting that the local committee was a government entity, at a time when political involvement was prohibited by the organization. On 17 September 1947, he requested affiliation to the IAAF. Otto Mayer demanded that it complied with protocol in a reply to the first letter sent a week later. On 1 October, Ernest J.H. Holt echoed this stance on behalf of the IAAF. In January 1948, Puerto Rico's application was favorably received despite being affiliated to the government, giving birth to the COPUR. At the United States, this caused some controversy along the likes of Dan Ferris. On 25 March 1948, Puerto Rico was invited to the London Games. On 15 April 1948, the United States opposed the invitation. This stance was later reversed, under unknown conditions.

At the Puerto Rico House of Representatives funding of $10,000 was approved for the Games, but governor Jesús T. Piñero vetoed it. Despite causing controversy, Monagas sided with the governor. As a civilian initiative was being organized, the politicians reversed their stance and supported sending the delegation to London. However, a small delegation was sent as a formality, with no expectation of winning medals. Monagas himself led the group, accompanied by trainer Eugenio Guerra. The participation of Puerto Rico at the event gathered considerable media coverage from the likes of El Mundo. A parallel political debate was waged in the media. Upon the delegation's return, Piñero's stance had shifted to one of support for future participation in the Olympics.

== Medalists ==
Medal	Name	Sport	Event
Bronze	Juan Evangelista Venegas	Boxing	Bantamweight (51-54 kg)

== Athletics ==
Track events

Event	Athletes	Heat		Semifinal		Final	
Event	Athletes	Result	Rank	Result	Rank	Result	Rank
110 m hurdles	Julio E. Sabater	15.3	=14	Did not advance			

Field events

Event	Athletes	Qualification		Final	
Event	Athletes	Result	Rank	Result	Rank
High jump	Benjamín Casado	1.84	=21	Did not advance	
Pole vault	José "Fofo" Vicente	4.00	= 9th (T)	3.95	=9
Pole vault	José Celso Barbosa	4.00	= 9th (T)	3.95	=9

Legend:
NP = Notable Performance
Q = Qualified for Finals

== Boxing ==
Athlete	Event	Round of 32		Round of 16		Quarterfinals		Semifinals		Bronze Final		Final	
Athlete	Event	Opposition	Result	Opposition	Result	Opposition	Result	Opposition	Result	Opposition	Result	Opposition	Result
Juan Venegas	Bantamweight (51-54 kg)	Callebout (BEL)	W PTS	Lall (IND)	W PTS	Perera (CEY)	W PTS	Csik (HUN)	L PTS	Vicente (ESP)	W PTS (bronze)	Did not advance	
Clotilde Colón	Featherweight (54–58 kg)	Gundersen (NOR)	W KO R1	Savoie (CAN)	L PTS	Did not advance							
Israel Quitcon	Light-heavyweight (73-80 kg)	Roude (FRA)	W RSC R1	Szymura (POL)	L RSC R3	Did not advance							

Legend:
PTS = Points
RSC = Referee Stop Contest
R = Round

== Shooting ==
Rifle

Event	Athlete	Qualification		Final	
Event	Athlete	Score	Rank	Score	Rank
50 m rifle prone	George Johnson	590	25	X	X

Pistol

Event	Athlete	Qualification		Final	
Event	Athlete	Score	Rank	Score	Rank
50 m pistol	Miguel Barasorda	501	39	X	X
