= Ray Edwards (boxer) =

Jamaican boxer (1927–1991)

Personal information
- Full name: Anthony
- Born: 17 February 1927; Kingston, Colony of Jamaica, British Empire
- Died: May 1991; Hereford, England

Sport
- Sport: Boxing

Ray Anthony Edwards (17 February 1927 – May 1991) was a Jamaican boxer. A member of the Royal Air Force, Edwards would compete in boxing and would represent Jamaica at the 1948 Summer Olympics for the nation's first appearance at the Olympic Games. He would be entered in the men's light heavyweight and men's heavyweight events but would only start the latter event.

He would compete in the first round of the event against George Hunter. Edwards would lose by decision and would not advance to the second round, placing equal seventeenth alongside seven other athletes.

== Biography ==
Ray Anthony Edwards was born on 17 February 1927 in Kingston in what was then the Colony of Jamaica of the British Empire. Edwards would later join the Royal Air Force.

Edwards would compete in boxing and would represent Jamaica at the 1948 Summer Olympics in London, Great Britain, for the nation's first appearance at an Olympic Games. He would be entered in both the men's light heavyweight and men's heavyweight events but would only start the latter event.

The men's light heavyweight event was for competitors that weighed 80 kilograms (180 lb) or less. He would compete in the first round of his event on 9 August in the tenth match of the event. There, he would compete against George Hunter of South Africa. Edwards would lose by decision and would not advance to the second round held the following day. Overall, Edwards would place equal seventeenth alongside Alejandro Arteche, Erik Jensen, Mac Joachim, Otto Michtits, Hennie Quentemeijer, Otakar Rademacher, and Joseph Roude.

Edwards would later die in May 1991 in Hereford, England.
