= Boxing at the 1948 Summer Olympics – Light heavyweight =

Boxing competitions

Men's light heavyweight at the Games of the XIV Olympiad
- Venue: Earl's Court; Wembley Arena
- Date: 9–13 August 1948
- Competitors: 24 from 24 nations

Medalists
1st place, gold medalist(s)		George Hunter	South Africa
2nd place, silver medalist(s)		Don Scott	Great Britain
3rd place, bronze medalist(s)		Mauro Cía	Argentina

The men's light heavyweight boxing competition at the 1948 Olympic Games in London was held from 9 to 13 August at the Empress Hall in Earl's Court and the Wembley Arena.

== Competition format ==
Like all Olympic boxing events, the competition was a straight single-elimination tournament. The competition began with a preliminary round on 9 August, where the number of competitors was reduced to 16, and concluded with a final on 13 August. As there were less than 32 boxers in the competition, a number of boxers received a bye for the preliminary round. All bouts consisted of three periods where the boxers received points for every successful punch they land on their opponent's head or upper body. The boxer with the most points at the end of the bouts wins. If a boxer is knocked to the ground and cannot get up before the referee counts to 10 then the bout is over and the opponent wins.

== Results ==
Round of 32
Chuck Spieser (USA)	PTS
Erik Jensen (DEN)
Ray Edwards (JAM)
George Hunter (RSA)	PTS
Alejandro Arteche (ESP)
Vital L'Hoste (BEL)	PTS
Otto Michtits (AUT)
Harry Siljander (FIN)	PTS
Mauro Cía (ARG)	PTS
Hennie Quentemeijer (NED)
Felipe Posse (URU)	PTS
Otakar Rademacher (TCH)
Joseph Roude (FRA)
Israel Quitcón (PUR)	RSC-1
Franciszek Szymura (POL)	PTS
Mac Joachim (IND)

Round of 16
Mohamed El-Minabawi (EGY)
Adrian Holmes (AUS)	KO-2
Hans Schwarzmann (SUI)
Hugh O'Hagan (IRL)	PTS
Eskandar Shora (IRI)
Giacomo Di Segni (ITA)	PTS
Don Scott (GBR)	RSC-2
György Kapocsi (HUN)
Chuck Spieser (USA)
George Hunter (RSA)	PTS
Vital L'Hoste (BEL)
Harry Siljander (FIN)	PTS
Mauro Cía (ARG)	DSQ-3
Felipe Posse (URU)
Israel Quitcón (PUR)
Franciszek Szymura (POL)	RSC-1

Quarter-finals
Adrian Holmes (AUS)	PTS
Hugh O'Hagan (IRL)
Giacomo Di Segni (ITA)
Don Scott (GBR)	PTS
George Hunter (RSA)	PTS
Harry Siljander (FIN)
Mauro Cía (ARG)	PTS
Franciszek Szymura (POL)

Semi-finals
Adrian Holmes (AUS)
Don Scott (GBR)	PTS
George Hunter (RSA)	PTS
Mauro Cía (ARG)

Final
Don Scott (GBR)
George Hunter (RSA)	PTS
Third place
Adrian Holmes (AUS)
Mauro Cía (ARG)	RSC-3
