= Boxing at the 1948 Summer Olympics – Bantamweight =

Boxing competitions

The men's bantamweight event was part of the boxing programme at the 1948 Summer Olympics. The weight class was the second-lightest contested, and allowed boxers of up to 54 kilograms. The competition was held from Saturday to Friday, 7 to 13 August 1948. Thirty boxers from 30 nations competed.

== Medalists ==
Gold	Silver	Bronze
Tibor Csík; Hungary	Giovanni Zuddas; Italy	Juan Venegas; Puerto Rico

== Results ==
Jimmy Carruthers was not able to fight in the quarterfinals against Tibor Csík after suffering an eye injury during his bout with Arnoldo Parés.

Round of 32; 7 August
Juan Venegas (PUR)	PTS
Louis Calebout (BEL)	L
Babu Lall (IND)	W
Allan Monteiro (PAK)	RSC1
Salvador Rivera (PER)	PTS
Bertil Ahlin (SWE)	L
Tibor Csík (HUN)	W
Manoel do Nascimento (BRA)	DQ2
Arnoldo Parés (ARG)	PTS
Vic Toweel (RSA)	L
Jimmy Carruthers (AUS)	W
Fred Daigle (CAN)	DQ2
Edel Ojeda (MEX)	PTS
Tommy Proffitt (GBR)	L
Álvaro Vicente (ESP)	PTS
Emanoul Aghasi (IRI)	L
Pedro Carrizo (URU)	PTS
Hermann Mazurkiewitsch (AUT)	L
Celestino González (CHI)	PTS
Wawrzyniec Bazarnik (POL)	L
Willie Lenihan (IRL)	PTS
Roger Behm (LUX)	L
Olavi Ouvinen (FIN)	PTS
Erik Thastum (DEN)	L
Giovanni Zuddas (ITA)	PTS
Bonifacio Zarcal (PHI)	L
Jean-Marie Grenot (FRA)	PTS
Bill Bossio (USA)	L

Round of 16; 10 August
Saw Hardy (BIR)	W
Albert Perera (CEY)	RSC2
Juan Evangelista Venegas (PUR)	PTS
Babu Lall (IND)	L
Santiago Rivera (PER)	L
Tibor Csík (HUN)	PTS
Arnoldo Parés (ARG)	L
Jimmy Carruthers (AUS)	PTS
Edel Ojeda (MEX)	DQ3
Álvaro Vicente (ESP)	W
Pedro Carrizo (URU)	L
Celestino González (CHI)	PTS
Willie Lenihan (IRL)	PTS
Olavi Ouvinen (FIN)	L
Giovanni Zuddas (ITA)	PTS
Jean-Marie Grenot (FRA)	L

Quarterfinals; 11 August
Albert Perera (CEY)	L
Juan Evangelista Venegas (PUR)	PTS
Tibor Csík (HUN)	W
Jimmy Carruthers (AUS)	wo
Álvaro Vicente (ESP)	W
Celestino González (CHI)	DQ2
Willie Lenihan (IRL)	RSC3
Giovanni Zuddas (ITA)	W

Semifinals; 12 August
Juan Evangelista Venegas (PUR)	L
Tibor Csík (HUN)	PTS
Álvaro Vicente (ESP)	L
Giovanni Zuddas (ITA)	PTS

Final; 13 August
Tibor Csík (HUN)	PTS
Giovanni Zuddas (ITA)	L
Bronze medal bout
Juan Evangelista Venegas (PUR)	PTS
Álvaro Vicente (ESP)	L
