= Adrian Holmes (boxer) =

Australian boxer

Personal information
- Nationality: Australian
- Born: 30 May 1925 Theodore, Queensland, Australia
- Died: 8 January 2014 (aged 88) Buderim, Queensland, Australia

Sport
- Sport: Boxing

Adrian Holmes (30 May 1925 – 8 January 2014) was an Australian boxer.

He competed in the men's light heavyweight event at the 1948 Summer Olympics.

== 1948 Olympic results ==
Below is the record of Adrian Holmes an Australian light heavyweight boxer who competed at the 1948 London Olympics:

- Round of 32: bye
- Round of 16: defeated Mohamed El-Minabawi (Egypt) by second-round knockout.
- Quarterfinal: defeated Hugh O'Hagan (Ireland) on points.
- Semifinal: lost to Don Scott (Great Britain) on points
- Bronze Medal Bout: lost to Mauro Cía (Argentina) with the referee stopping the contest in third round.

== Personal life and death ==
Holmes was the second youngest of five boys. After his boxing career concluded, Holmes found employment as a stock and station agent for Elders.

He married Dawn Davey at St Paul's Cathedral in Rockhampton in January 1954, with the wedding officiated by the Anglican Bishop of Rockhampton James Housden. During their marriage, the couple had three sons and two daughters. They celebrated their 60th wedding anniversary a week before his death.

Holmes died at the age of 87 in Buderim, Queensland Creation Centre on 8 February 2014.
