= Arteche (surname) =

Arteche is a surname. Notable people with the surname include:

- Alejandro Arteche (1923–1998), Spanish boxer
- Héctor Martínez Arteche (1934–2011), Mexican painter and muralist
- Juan Carlos Arteche (1957–2010), Spanish footballer
- Miguel Arteche (1926–2012), Chilean poet and novelist
