= Boxing at the 1948 Summer Olympics =

Coordinates: 51.5556°N 0.2797°W

Boxing at the Games of the XIV Olympiad

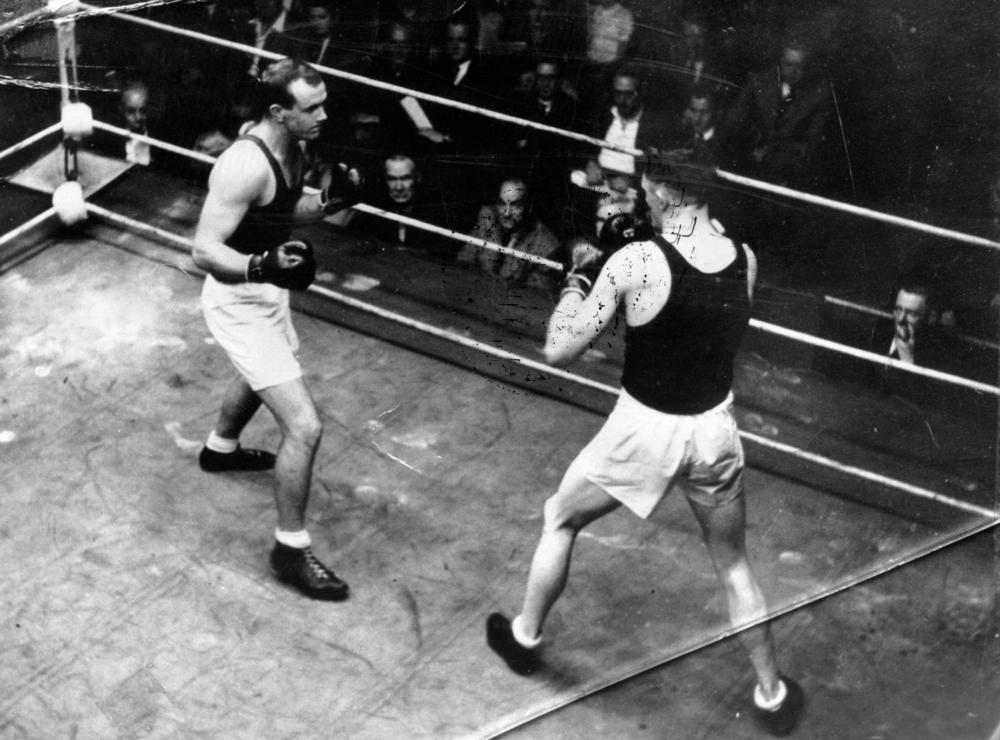
Light heavyweight fight featuring Australian boxer Adrian Holmes

Final results for the Boxing competition at the 1948 Summer Olympics.

== Medal summary ==
Games	Gold	Silver	Bronze
Flyweight (−51 kg)	Pascual Pérez; Argentina	Spartaco Bandinelli; Italy	Han Soo-Ann; South Korea
Bantamweight (−54 kg)	Tibor Csík; Hungary	Gianbattista Zuddas; Italy	Juan Evangelista Venegas; Puerto Rico
Featherweight (−58 kg)	Ernesto Formenti; Italy	Dennis Shepherd; South Africa	Aleksy Antkiewicz; Poland
Lightweight (−62 kg)	Gerald Dreyer; South Africa	Joseph Vissers; Belgium	Svend Wad; Denmark
Welterweight (−67 kg)	Július Torma; Czechoslovakia	Hank Herring; United States	Alessandro D'Ottavio; Italy
Middleweight (−73 kg)	László Papp; Hungary	John Wright; Great Britain	Ivano Fontana; Italy
Light heavyweight (−80 kg)	George Hunter; South Africa	Don Scott; Great Britain	Mauro Cía; Argentina
Heavyweight (+80 kg)	Rafael Iglesias; Argentina	Gunnar Nilsson; Sweden	John Arthur; South Africa

== Medal table ==
Rank	Nation	Gold	Silver	Bronze	Total
1	South Africa	2	1	1	4
2	Argentina	2	0	1	3
3	Hungary	2	0	0	2
4	Italy	1	2	2	5
5	Czechoslovakia	1	0	0	1
6	Great Britain	0	2	0	2
7	Belgium	0	1	0	1
7	Sweden	0	1	0	1
7	United States	0	1	0	1
10	Denmark	0	0	1	1
10	Poland	0	0	1	1
10	Puerto Rico	0	0	1	1
10	South Korea	0	0	1	1
Totals (13 entries)		8	8	8	24

== Participating nations ==
A total of 206 boxers from 39 nations competed at the London Games:

- Argentina (8)
- Australia (7)
- Austria (5)
- Belgium (8)
- Brazil (3)
- Burma (2)
- Canada (7)
- Ceylon (4)
- Chile (5)
- Czechoslovakia (5)
- Denmark (6)
- Egypt (5)
- Finland (6)
- France (8)
- Great Britain (8)
- Hungary (6)
- India (7)
- Iran (8)
- Ireland (8)
- Italy (8)
- Jamaica (1)
- South Korea (3)
- Lebanon (1)
- Luxembourg (4)
- Mexico (1)
- Netherlands (6)
- Norway (4)
- New Zealand (1)
- Pakistan (3)
- Peru (4)
- Philippines (5)
- Poland (6)
- Puerto Rico (3)
- South Africa (8)
- Spain (8)
- Switzerland (4)
- Sweden (4)
- Uruguay (8)
- United States (8)
