= Nat Fleischer =

American boxing writer (1887–1972)

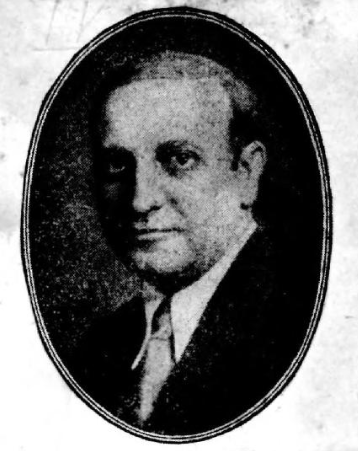
- Fleischer in 1936
- Born: November 3, 1887; New York City, U.S.
- Died: June 25, 1972 (aged 84); Atlantic Beach, New York, U.S.
- Occupation: Boxing writer

Nathaniel Stanley Fleischer (November 3, 1887 – June 25, 1972) was a noted American boxing writer and collector.

== Career ==
Fleischer was born in New York City. After he graduated from City College of New York in 1908, Fleischer worked for the New York Press while studying at New York University. He served as the sports editor of the Press and the Sun Press until 1929. Encouraged by Tex Rickard, he inaugurated in 1922 The Ring magazine. In 1929 Fleischer acquired sole ownership of the magazine, which he led as editor-in-chief for fifty years, until his death at Atlantic Beach, New York in 1972.

In 1942, Fleischer began to publish the magazine's annual record book and boxing encyclopedia, which was published until 1987. In addition, Fleischer wrote several other books about the lives of some world champions and about boxing history.

Fleischer contributed to the founding of the Boxing Writers Association of America (BWAA) and was twice presented with its James J. Walker Award (now the Barney Nagler Award). After Fleischer's death, the BWAA named the Nat Fleischer Award after him. Fleischer, who had been instrumental in creating The Ring Boxing Hall of Fame in 1954 (disbanded in 1987), was himself an inaugural 1990 inductee to the International Boxing Hall of Fame.

== Carruthers-Songkitrat match ==
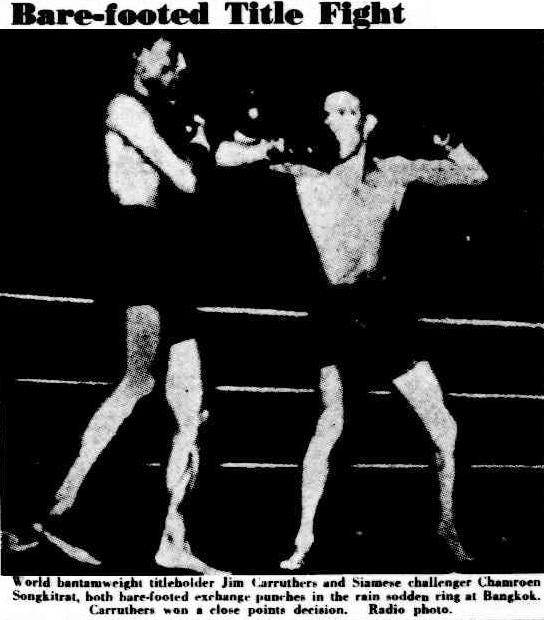
Songkitrat (left) and Carruthers (right) fight barefoot in a monsoon

In 1954, Fleischer was involved with the "Bare-footed Title Fight", a world championship bout fought in Thailand's open air Chulalongkorn Stadium during a tropical monsoon.

Thai General Pichai invited Fleischer as a special guest to his homeland, as a way to ensure that the World Bantamweight Championship bout, between champion Jimmy Carruthers of Australia and challenger Chamroen Songkitrat, would follow the international boxing rules. It rained on the day of the fight, and 60,000 people (including the boxers) were drenched. Fleischer suggested the fight be postponed and that they wait to see if the weather would get better the next day, but General Pichai ordered the bout to take place, reasoning that it would be hard to send off 60,000 people and the other thousands who were stranded outside under the pouring rain, to have them return the next day. In an effort to better their traction in the flooded ring, this became the first recorded match in modern world boxing history where the fighters removed their footwear. Carruthers retained his crown by decision, and retired shortly after.

== Ali-Liston rematch ==
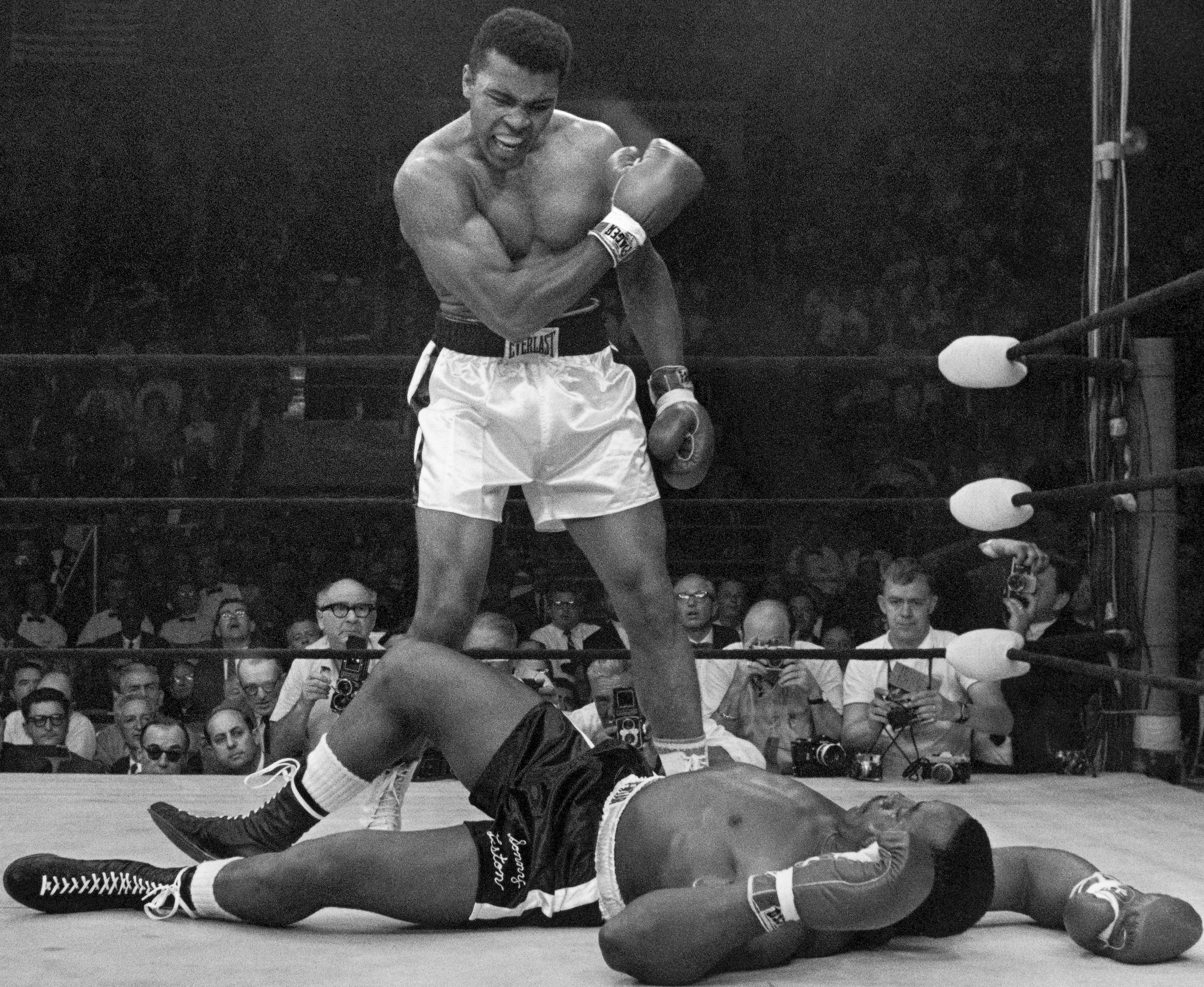
Muhammad Ali standing over Sonny Liston after the "anchor punch"

Fleischer was seated at ringside on May 25, 1965, at the heavyweight championship rematch between Muhammad Ali and Sonny Liston in Lewiston, Maine to report on the contest for The Ring. Fleischer played a role in the strange and controversial ending of the fight. When Liston went down in the first round from Ali's infamous 'anchor punch," Ali did not go to a neutral corner. Instead he circled near the fallen Liston, taunting him to get up shouting "Nobody will believe this!". By the time Liston did rise to continue the fight, he had been on the canvas for more than ten seconds. Fleischer yelled at referee Jersey Joe Walcott (the former heavyweight titlist) to inform him that the knockdown timekeeper's count had reached ten with Liston still on the canvas. Walcott improperly declared Ali the winner by knockout even though he had not gone to a neutral corner. By rule, if a fighter delays going to a neutral corner after scoring a knockdown, the count is not to start until he gets there.

== Fleischer and lineal titles ==
As editor of The Ring, Fleischer believed that professional boxing titles had to be won and lost within the ring. His policy in recognizing world champions followed a principle that a fighter could not be stripped of a title by any state or national boxing commission. (A title could only be vacated by a champion who retired, died, or voluntarily relinquished the crown to fight in a different weight class.) This policy was severely tested in 1967 with Muhammad Ali. Ali had won the world heavyweight championship by dethroning Sonny Liston in 1964. As part of the antiwar movement in the United States during the Vietnam era, Muhammad Ali lost his world heavyweight crown in the eyes of most American boxing commissions when he refused to be inducted in the U.S. Army. Despite Ali possessing no boxing license in the United States and no passport to travel outside the United States to fight, The Ring continued to list Ali as the rightful world champion in its heavyweight rankings until 1970 when Ali informed Fleischer he was retiring from boxing. (Ironically, later that same year Ali won a court victory that allowed him to box again.) Fleischer's continued recognition of Ali as world champion for more than two years was considered controversial. Many boxing fans at the time criticized The Ring's policy—and Fleischer specifically—for continuing to list Ali as world heavyweight champion while he was inactive. Despite its recognition of Ali as world champion, The Ring continued to commonly refer to him as Cassius Clay or Clay/Ali until the early 1970s.

== Published works ==
- Fleischer, Nat (1936). From Milo to Londos: The Story of Wrestling Through the Ages. The Ring Athletic Library.
- Fleischer, Nat (1958). 50 Years At Ringside. New York: Fleet Publishing Corp.
