= Grises de Humacao =

Basketball team based in Humacao, Puerto Rico

- Nickname: "The Greys"
- Leagues: BSN
- Founded: 2005
- Dissolved: 2023
- History: Grises de Humacao (2005–2010; 2021–2023)
- Arena: Marcelo Trujillo Coliseum
- Capacity: 8,000
- Location: Humacao, Puerto Rico
- Team colors: Grey, black and white
- Ownership: Ernesto “Ernie” Cambo
- Championships: 0
Home	Away	Third

Grises de Humacao (lit. "Humacao Greys") were a basketball team based in Humacao, Puerto Rico, which competed in the Baloncesto Superior Nacional (BSN), the top professional league in Puerto Rico, until the relocation of the team following the 2023 season. Following unanimous league approval, the team was sold to a new ownership group, and moved to become the Criollos de Caguas.

== History ==
The team was originally created in 2005, when the Toritos de Cayey franchise was moved to Humacao. The Grises' homecourtwais the Emilio Huyke Coliseum. In 2010 Antonio "Tonin" Casillas, the team's owner, decided to give the franchise a makeover and changed the name to Caciques de Humacao. The main reason was to reflect a more positive image on a city which has always been known as the "gray" city. The change also shifted the public opinion on to the Taino heritage of the city and honors the chieftain Jumakao, who fought a rebellion against the Spanish over 500 years ago.

=== Expansion franchise & forced sale (2021–2024) ===
Prior to the 2021 season, the league granted Florida-based businessman Ernesto Cambo a new franchise under the name of Grises de Humacao. The team replaced the Caciques, which were transferred to Guayama in 2019. Cambo named himself coach and brought in his son, Anthony, as an imported player. These decisions, among others, meant that the team were never successful in the three seasons that Cambo was owner. In the fall of 2023, following unanimous league approval, the team was sold to a new ownership group, and moved to become the Criollos de Caguas ahead of the 2024 season.

== Notable players ==
- (Dominican Republic) (United States) L. J. Figueroa
