= Philippines at the 1948 Summer Olympics =

- Flag of the Philippines
- IOC code: PHI
- NOC: Philippine Amateur Athletic Federation

in London
- Competitors: 26 in 8 sports
- Medals: Gold 0 Silver 0 Bronze 0 Total 0

Summer Olympics appearances (overview)
- 1924; 1928; 1932; 1936; 1948; 1952; 1956; 1960; 1964; 1968; 1972; 1976; 1980; 1984; 1988; 1992; 1996; 2000; 2004; 2008; 2012; 2016; 2020; 2024; 2028

The Philippines competed at the 1948 Summer Olympics in Wembley Park, London, England. A total of 26 competitors, all men, participated in 18 events across 8 sports.

== Athletics ==
Men
Track & road events

Athlete	Event	Heat		Quarterfinal		Semifinal		Final	
Athlete	Event	Result	Rank	Result	Rank	Result	Rank	Result	Rank
Bernabe Lovina	100 m	(11.32)	5	Did not advance					
Bernabe Lovina	200 m	23.2	3	Did not advance					

== Boxing ==
Athlete	Event	Round of 32	Round of 16	Quarterfinals	Semifinals	Final
Athlete	Event	Opposition Result	Opposition Result	Opposition Result	Opposition Result	Rank
Ricardo Adolfo	Flyweight	Pérez (ARG); L RSC 2	Did not advance			
Bonifacio Zarcal	Bantamweight	Zuddas (ITA); L	Did not advance			
Leon Trani	Featherweight	Antkiewicz (POL); L	Did not advance			
Ernesto Porto	Lightweight	Bye	Dreyer (RSA); L	Did not advance		
Mariano Vélez	Welterweight	Blackburn (CAN); L	Did not advance			

== Basketball ==
- Preliminary round (group B)

- Defeated Iraq (102-30)
- Defeated South Korea (35-33)
- Lost to Chile (39-68)
- Defeated China (51-32)
- Lost to Belgium (35-37)

- Classification 9-16

- Defeated Argentina (45-43)

- Classification 9-12

- Lost to Peru (29-40)

- Classification 11/12

- Lost to Belgium (34-38) → did not advance, 12th place

- Team roster

- Manuel Araneta
- Ramon Campos Jr.
- Eduardo Decena
- Andres dela Cruz
- Felicisimo "Fely" Fajardo (c)
- Gabriel "Gabby" Fajardo
- Edgardo "Eduardo" Fulgencio
- Primitivo Martinez
- Lauro Mumar
- Francisco Vestil

- Head coach: Dionisio "Chito" Calvo

== Shooting ==
Three shooters represented the Philippines in 1948.

25 metre pistol

- Martin Gison

50 metre pistol

- Martin Gison
- Albert von Einsiedel

50 metre rifle

- Martin Gison
- Albert von Einsiedel
- César Jayme

== Swimming ==
Men

Athlete	Event	Heat		Semifinal		Final	
Athlete	Event	Time	Rank	Time	Rank	Time	Rank
Sambiao Basanung	400 m freestyle	5:21.5	34	Did not advance			
Sambiao Basanung	1500 m freestyle	21:05.9	23	Did not advance			
René Amabuyok	200 m breaststroke	2:52.6	16 Q	2:51.8	13	Did not advance	
Jacinto Cayco	200 m breaststroke	2:54.0	18	Did not advance			

== Weightlifting ==
Athlete	Event	Press		Snatch		Clean & Jerk		Total	Rank
Athlete	Event	Result	Rank	Result	Rank	Result	Rank	Total	Rank
Rodrigo del Rosario	Men's 60 kg	97.5	2	92.5	11	117.5	14	307.5	5

== Wrestling ==
Men's Bantamweight

- Francisco Vicera
