= Allan Monteiro =

Pakistani boxer (born 1922)

Personal information
- Nationality: Pakistani
- Born: 1922

Sport
- Sport: Boxing

Allan Monteiro (born 1922) was a Pakistani boxer. He competed in the men's bantamweight event at the 1948 Summer Olympics. At the 1948 Summer Olympics, he lost to Babu Lall of India in the Round of 32.
