= Louis Calebout =

Belgian boxer

Personal information
- Nationality: Belgian
- Born: 27 July 1928; Bruges, Belgium
- Died: 30 August 2010 (aged 82); Bruges, Belgium

Sport
- Sport: Boxing

Louis Calebout (27 July 1928 – 30 August 2010) was a Belgian boxer. He competed in the men's bantamweight event at the 1948 Summer Olympics. At the 1948 Summer Olympics, he lost his first bout to Juan Venegas of Puerto Rico in the Round of 32.
