= Emilio E. Huyke Coliseum =

Indoor sporting arena located in Humacao, Puerto Rico

Emilio E. Huyke Coliseum Coliseo Emilio E. Huyke
- Interactive map of Emilio E. Huyke Coliseum; Coliseo Emilio E. Huyke
- Location: Humacao, Puerto Rico
- Coordinates: 18.1484°N 65.8343°W
- Owner: Municipality of Humacao
- Operator: Municipality of Humacao
- Capacity: 1,500 (approx. maximum)

Construction
- Opened: 1987

Tenants
- Caciques de Humacao, BSN

Emilio E. Huyke Coliseum (Spanish: Coliseo Emilio E. Huyke) is an indoor sporting arena located in Humacao, Puerto Rico. The coliseum is named after sports writer and former Secretary of the Puerto Rico Olympic Committee, Emilio E. Huyke.

The coliseum's seating capacity is 1,500 seats. It is used mostly for Volleyball and basketball as the home arena of the Caciques de Humacao. Is located within the Osvaldo Gil sports complex.
