= Juan Evangelista Venegas =

First Puerto Rican to win an Olympic medal

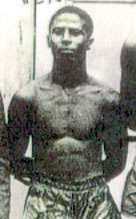
- Venegas in 1948

Personal information
- Nickname: "Veneguitas"
- Nationality: Puerto Rican
- Born: Juan Evangelista Venegas Trinidad; December 27, 1928 Río Piedras, Puerto Rico
- Died: April 16, 1987 (aged 58)
- Weight: Bantamweight; Featherweight

Boxing career
- Stance: Southpaw

Boxing record
- Total fights: 32
- Wins: 20
- Win by KO: 7
- Losses: 10
- Draws: 2
Medal record
Men's boxing
Representing Puerto Rico
Olympic Games
Bronze medal – third place	1948 London	Bantamweight

Juan Evangelista Venegas Trinidad (December 27, 1928 – April 16, 1987) was a Puerto Rican boxer notable for winning Puerto Rico's first Olympic medal.

== Early years ==
Venegas (birth name: Juan Evangelista Venegas Trinidad) was born in an underprivileged section of the town of Río Piedras. Río Piedras at the time was not incorporated into the City of San Juan, Puerto Rico. There street fighting was a common way of life and many of the youth at that time saw the sport of boxing as a way to a better life. Among them was Venegas, who admired Puerto Rico's first international boxing champion, Sixto Escobar. Venegas took up boxing and his performance in the ring soon caught the attention of the island's recently established Olympic Committee. In 1948 the Puerto Rican Olympic Committee included him in the delegation which would represent the island.

== 1948 Summer Olympics ==
The 1948 Summer Olympics celebrated in London, was a historical one for Puerto Rico because it was the first time that the island would participate as a nation in an international sporting event. The island's delegation consisted of twelve members. In their opening ceremonies, the Puerto Rican delegation carried the flag of the United States into the Olympic stadium. The United States protested, claiming that two nations could not use the same flag at the same time. The decree of Commonwealth on July 25, 1952, would give the Puerto Rican delegation a flag of their own.

In the 1948 Summer Olympics, known as the XIV Olympics, Juan Evangelista Venegas made Puerto Rican sports history by winning Puerto Rico's first Olympic medal ever when he beat Belgium's representative, Louis Callenboat, on points for a unanimous decision. He won the bronze medal in boxing in the Bantamweight division, falling short of the silver medal to Giovanni Zuddas.

== 1948 Olympic results ==
Below are the results of Juan Evangelista Venegas who competed as a bantamweight boxer for Puerto Rico at the 1948 London Olympics:

- Round of 32: defeated Louis Calebout (Belgium) on points
- Round of 16: defeated Babu Lall (India) on points
- Quarterfinal: defeated Albert Perera (Ceylon) on points
- Semifinal: lost to Tibor Csík (Hungary) on points
- Bronze-Medal bout: defeated Álvaro Vicente (Spain) on points (won bronze medal)

== Professional boxing career ==
After returning to a hero's welcome to Puerto Rico, Venegas turned professional. In 1948, Venegas made his professional boxing debut against Puerto Rican Abelardo Alejandro. Venegas, a southpaw, fought in the bantamweight and featherweight division for a total of 32 fights, compiling a record of 20-10-2. His last fight was in 1958 against Al Tisi.

== Death and legacy ==
On April 16, 1987, Juan Evangelista Venegas died when he suffered a fall at his home which caused a skull fracture. A week before his death, he was honored by the College of Engineers and Surveyors of Puerto Rico.

In honor of his memory, the Puerto Rican Boxing Commission sponsors the Juan Evangelista Venegas boxing tournament, which serves as a tune-up to future Olympic boxing prospects. There is a Juan Evangelista Venegas Olympic Cup which is given in other sports with Olympic orientation.

== See also ==
- Black history in Puerto Rico
- List of Puerto Ricans
