= Schwerzmann =

Schwerzmann is a surname. Notable people with the surname include:

- Beat Schwerzmann (born 1966), Swiss rower
- Hans Schwerzmann (born 1925), Swiss boxer
- Ingeburg Schwerzmann (born 1967), German rower
- Manuela Schwerzmann (born 1976), Swiss tennis player
- Marcel Schwerzmann (born 1965), Swiss politician
