= Bill Bossio =

American boxer

Personal information
- Born: February 23, 1928 Pittsburgh, Pennsylvania, U.S.
- Died: September 16, 2016 (aged 88) Stuart, Florida, U.S.
- Height: 5 ft 0 1/2 in (1.54 m)

Sport
- Sport: Boxing

Bill Bossio (February 23, 1928 – September 16, 2016) was an American boxer. He competed in the men's bantamweight event at the 1948 Summer Olympics. At the 1948 Summer Olympics, he lost to Jean-Marie Grenot of France.

== Early life ==
Born in the United States, Bossio developed an interest in boxing at a young age. He honed his skills in local gyms, demonstrating dedication and a strong work ethic.

=== 1948 Summer Olympics ===
At the age of 20, Bossio represented the United States in the bantamweight division at the 1948 London Olympics. In his opening bout, he faced French boxer Jean-Marie Grenot but was eliminated after a hard-fought match.

=== Post-Olympic career ===
Following the Olympics, Bossio continued his involvement in boxing, participating in various national competitions. While he did not achieve significant international acclaim, he remained a respected figure in the American boxing community.

=== Legacy ===
Bill Bossio's Olympic appearance in 1948 stands as a testament to his skill and dedication to the sport. His commitment to boxing has inspired future generations of American boxers.
