= Don Scott (boxer) =

British boxer (1928–2013)

Personal information
- Nationality: British (English)
- Born: 23 July 1928 Derby, Derbyshire
- Died: 19 February 2013 (aged 84) Derby, Derbyshire

Sport
- Sport: boxing
Medal record
Men's Boxing
Representing Great Britain
Olympic Games
| Silver medal – second place | 1948 London | Light Heavyweight |
Representing England
British Empire Games
| Gold medal – first place | 1950 Auckland | Light heavyweight |

Donald Emerson Scott (23 July 1928 – 13 February 2013) was a boxer from Great Britain, who competed in the Light Heavyweight division during his career as an amateur. He fought as Don Scott.

== Biography ==
Born Donald Emerson Scott in Derby in 1928, he began boxing at age 12 at the Arboretum Boxing Club. He attended Pear Tree School, He attended night school at Bemrose School to take English & Math GCSE at the age of 59. He wife Doreen died in 2004, He has a daughter named Sue and a son named Paul, He has two grandchildren named Simon and Adam, and great-grandson named William, whom he met William three days before he died. He was chosen to carry the Olympic torch though Derby on 29 June 2012.

=== Amateur career ===
Scott represented his native country at the 1948 Summer Olympics, and won the silver medal at Light Heavyweight. He subsequently won the Empire Games gold medal in Auckland in 1950. He served in the Royal Military Police during national service. In his autobiography, the famous boxing referee Harry Gibbs claimed to have fought Scott and won during their military service. Scott had no recollection of the bout; Gibbs is adamant that Scott was a serving soldier in the Brigade of Guards so it is possibly a namesake.

Scott won the Amateur Boxing Association 1948 light heavyweight title, when boxing for the army.

== 1948 Olympic record ==
Below are the results of Don Scott, a British light heavyweight boxer who competed at the 1948 London Olympics:

- Round of 32: bye
- Round of 16: defeated György Kapocsi (Hungary) referee stopped contest in the second round
- Quarterfinal: defeated Giacomo Di Segni (Italy) on points
- Semifinal: defeated Adrian Holmes (Australia) on points
- Final: lost to George Hunter (South Africa) on points (was awarded silver medal)

=== Professional career ===
He boxed professionally as a heavyweight and was managed by Bob Curley. He was a big enough name from his amateur career to box in London at the Albert Hall. His professional career was not as successful as his amateur. On his retirement from the ring he was involved in retail management. He continued his interest in boxing in the Derby area and was involved in coaching. He regularly attended both amateur and professional boxing events in Derby and preferred to sit quietly at the back rather than be presented in the ring.

=== Death ===
Scott resided in Derby until his death on 16 February 2013. He lived at Arboretum House for three and a half years before moving to Lavender Lodge Nursing Home three weeks before he died of heart failure at the age of 84.
