= Hermann Mazurkiewitsch =

Austrian boxer (1925–1985)

Personal information
- Nationality: Austrian
- Born: 22 October 1925
- Died: 23 January 1985 (aged 59) Vienna, Austria

Sport
- Sport: Boxing

Hermann Mazurkiewitsch (22 October 1925 – 23 January 1985) was an Austrian boxer. He competed in the men's bantamweight event at the 1948 Summer Olympics. Mazurkiewitsch died in Vienna on 23 January 1985, at the age of 59.
