= Julio Enrique Monagas =

Puerto Rican sports administrator

President of the Puerto Rico Olympic Committee
- In office 1952–1956
- In office 1958–1965

Personal details
- Born: 17 October 1903 Ponce, Puerto Rico
- Died: 14 July 1984 (aged 80) Ponce, Puerto Rico

Julio Enrique Monagas (1900/1903 – 14 July 1984) was a Puerto Rican sports editor and administrator considered the father of Olympic sports in Puerto Rico. Through his efforts, Puerto Rico was admitted into the Olympic Games in 1948. Monagas was also the first director Puerto Rico's Public Recreation and Parks Commission, and the first president of the Central American and Caribbean Sports Organization.

== First years ==
While still a boy, Monagas competed in several track and field events, including the shot put and pole vaulting. He went to college at the Polytechnic Institute in San Germán, Puerto Rico, the school that became the Inter-American University of Puerto Rico.

== Sports enthusiast and advocate ==
In 1928 Monagas became "the first and finest" sports editor to work for a local newspaper (El Día), and in 1929, Monagas founded one of the first two athletic clubs on the island, the Ponce Athletic Club. Along with the San Juan Olympic Club, the Ponce Athletic Club was the first sports organization not affiliated with an educational institution. During the 1930s he worked on promoting the development of sports in Ponce and southern Puerto Rico. In 1938, he was part of the Puerto Rican delegation that participated in the Sixth Central American Games in Panama, both as an athlete delegate and as a journalist.

== Public servant ==
In 1941, he was appointed director of Puerto Rico's Comisión de Recreo y Deportes Públicos (Public Sports and Recreation Commission), with responsibility to regulate sports in Puerto Rico. As director of the Comisión, Monagas sent Puerto Rican teams to play exhibition games in other countries. In 1947, the Comisión de Recreo y Deportes Públicos became the Comisión de Parques y Recreo Públicos (Public Recreation and Parks Commission) under Monagas' direction. In the same year, Monagas created the Federación de Atletismo Aficionado de Puerto Rico (Puerto Rico Amateur Athletics Federation) which he presided until 1965. The Federation was instrumental in the development of track and field islandwide. Later, the organization affiliated with the International Amateur Athletics Federation.

In 1950, the Commission became the Administracion de Parques y Recreos Publicos (Public Recreation and Parks Administration). Under his directorship, sports and recreation saw significant growth islandwide: baseball leagues were created for children, the Golden Gloves Association was formed to organize amateur boxing, and parks were established throughout the island. In February 1960, Monagas was elected president of the Central American and Caribbean Sports Organization (ODECABE). In 1980, this government agency became the Departamento de Recreación y Deportes (Department of Recreation and Sports).

== International Olympics competitions ==
In 1946, Monagas asked the International Olympic Committee (IOC) to recognize the Puerto Rico Olympic Committee, which consisted of Governor Jesús T. Piñero as chairman, Monagas as vice-chairman, Roberto Sánchez Vilella as secretary, and Rafael Buscaglia, Jorge Jiménez, and Luis Torres Ros as members. The IOC responded requiring that Puerto Rico first join the international sports organizations. On September 17, 1947, Monagas re-submitted his request and in January, 1948, the ICO officially recognized the Puerto Rico Olympic Committee. That year, Puerto Rico participated in three sports in the Olympic Games held in London in 1950: track and field, marksmanship, and boxing. In boxing Puerto Rico won a bronze medal under Juan Evangelista Venegas.

The Puerto Rican delegation joined the opening parade in the London games carrying a white flag with the seal of Puerto Rico. In 1952, a Puerto Rican delegation was sent to the Olympic Games in Helsinki. This time, they first carried the United States flag, but after July 25, the date of the founding of the Commonwealth of Puerto Rico, the Puerto Rican delegation carried the official flag of the newly constituted Commonwealth of Puerto Rico.

In 1955, the Pan American Sports Organization elected Monagas to lead the committee of statutes. This gave Puerto Rico the role of coordinating the upcoming 1959 Pan American Games. Formal recognition of the COPUR by the United States, namely the American Olympic Committee and Amateur Athletic Union (AAU), did not take place until Monagas accomplished it in 1957. Following a weak performance at the 1959 Pan American Games, the sport modernization practices and equipment supplied to the athletes became a point of contention. Despite this, a number of Latin American teams requested Monagas' assessment of their athletic facilities.

The United States Lawn Tennis Association blocked Puerto Rico's attempt to be recognized by the International Lawn Tennis Federation. This resulted in Monagas accusing the USLTA of acting in a "colonial spirit", not unlike China did with Taiwan.

== Controversies ==
In 1956, some members of the Puerto Rico Shooting Federation challenged the Puerto Rico Olympic Committee because it consisted of government officials, thus violating Rule 25 of the Olympic Charter which stipulated that national Olympic committees should be "completely independent and autonomous and completely free of political, religious and commercial influence." A new Olympic Committee was formed with members of the five Puerto Rican federations that had international affiliations – athletics, boxing, cycling, weightlifting and shooting – but it was challenged again as it still included Monagas, who was both the president of the Puerto Rico Athletics Association and the director of the Public Recreation and Parks Administration. Finally, a new committee was formed under the direction of businessman Jaime Annexy and other members of the federations. The IOC granted provisional recognition to the Puerto Rican committee, which allowed Puerto Rico to participate in the Olympic Games held in Melbourne, Australia in 1956. In 1958, after Annexy's death, the committee was challenged again. A new committee was formed, headed by Julio E. Monagas, and it was officially recognized as the Puerto Rico Olympic Committee. Monagas served as president until 1965.

== Later years ==
From 1962 to 1965, Monagas served as the first president of the Central American and Caribbean Sports Organization, an entity formed in 1962 to take charge of organizing the Central American and Caribbean Games. He retired in 1965. On April 4, 1984, he was awarded the Olympic Order, the highest honor granted by the International Olympic Committee to those who have contributed to the development of Olympic sports. Monagas died on 14 July 1984 in Ponce, Puerto Rico.

== Legacy ==
Julio Enrique Monagas is considered the father of Puerto Rican Olympic sports. Through his efforts Puerto Rico was able to achieve recognition from the International Olympic Committee and the island's sporting sovereignty was accepted internationally.

He is recognized in Ponce at the Park of the Illustrious Ponce Citizens. The Julio Enrique Monagas Family Park in Ponce, Puerto Rico, Julio E. Monagas National Park in Bayamon, Puerto Rico, and the Julio Enrique Monagas Park in Caguas, Puerto Rico were named after him.

== See also ==
- List of Puerto Ricans

== Sources ==
"Luto en el deporte con muerte de Monagas". El Mundo 15 July 1984. Printed version. Mayo Santana, Raúl. El juguete sagrado: Germán Rieckehoff Sampayo: vida y leyenda. San Juan, Puerto Rico: Plaza Mayor, 2000. Printed version. Torres Rivera, Johnny. "Antigua Administración de Parques y Recreo Públicos". Puerta de Tierra, San Juan, Puerto Rico, n. d. Web. 18 April 2010.
