= Manoel do Nascimento =

Brazilian boxer

Personal information
- Born: 11 August 1926; Rio de Janeiro, Brazil

Sport
- Sport: Boxing

Manoel do Nascimento (born 11 August 1926) was a Brazilian boxer. He competed in the men's bantamweight event at the 1948 Summer Olympics. At the 1948 Summer Olympics, he lost to Tibor Csík of Hungary.
