= Wawrzyniec Bazarnik =

Polish boxer

Personal information
- Nationality: Polish
- Born: 13 July 1927; Chorzów, Poland
- Died: 5 February 1977 (aged 49); Chorzów, Poland

Sport
- Sport: Boxing

Wawrzyniec Bazarnik (13 July 1927 – 5 February 1977) was a Polish boxer. He competed in the men's bantamweight event at the 1948 Summer Olympics.
