= Héctor Cardona =

Puerto Rican sports executive

President of the Puerto Rico Olympic Committee
- In office 1991–2008
- Preceded by: Osvaldo Gil
- Succeeded by: David Bernier

Personal details
- Born: April 19, 1936 Naguabo, Puerto Rico
- Died: June 16, 2017 (aged 81) San Juan, Puerto Rico

Héctor Francisco Cardona González (April 19, 1936 – June 16, 2017) was a Puerto Rican sports executive who served as the longtime President of the Puerto Rico Olympic Committee (COPUR) from 1991 until 2008, as well as the executive vice-president of International Amateur Boxing Association. Héctor Cardona was a boxing referee at the 1984 Summer Olympics in Los Angeles, California. He was serving as the President of the Central American and Caribbean Sports Organization (CASCO) at the time of his death in June 2017.

Most recently, Cardona was unanimously re-elected to a fourth term as President of CACSO by the 46th CACSO General Assembly in November 2015.

Cardona was born on April 19, 1936, in Naguabo, Puerto Rico. He died from liver cancer on June 16, 2017, in San Juan, Puerto Rico, at the age of 81.
