= Hans Schwerzmann =

Swiss boxer (1925–2001)

Personal information
- Full name: Marcel Hans Schwerzmann
- Nationality: Swiss
- Born: 30 January 1925 Biel/Bienne, Switzerland
- Died: January 2001 (aged 75–76)

Sport
- Sport: Boxing

Marcel Hans Schwerzmann (30 January 1925 – January 2001) was a Swiss boxer. He competed in the men's light heavyweight event at the 1948 Summer Olympics. At the 1948 Summer Olympics, after receiving a bye in the Round of 32, he lost in the Round of 16 to Hugh O'Hagan of Ireland. Schwerzmann died in January 2001.
