= Olavi Ouvinen =

Finnish boxer

Personal information
- Nationality: Finnish
- Born: 10 December 1926 Viipuri, Finland
- Died: 6 February 1990 (aged 63) Helsinki, Finland

Sport
- Sport: Boxing

Olavi Ouvinen (10 December 1926 – 6 February 1990) was a Finnish boxer. He competed in the men's bantamweight event at the 1948 Summer Olympics.
