= Pedro Carrizo (boxer) =

Uruguayan boxer

Personal information
- Born: 28 January 1921; Montevideo, Uruguay
- Died: 22 September 1997 (aged 76)

Sport
- Sport: Boxing

Pedro Carrizo (28 January 1921 – 22 September 1997) was a Uruguayan boxer. He competed in the men's bantamweight event at the 1948 Summer Olympics.
