= Erik Jensen (boxer) =

Danish boxer

Personal information
- Nationality: Danish
- Born: 1 October 1921 Aarhus, Denmark
- Died: 29 June 1987 (aged 65) Skanderborg, Denmark

Sport
- Sport: Boxing

Erik Jensen (1 October 1921 – 29 June 1987) was a Danish boxer. He competed in the men's light heavyweight event at the 1948 Summer Olympics. At the 1948 Summer Olympics, he lost to Chuck Spieser of the United States.

== See also ==
- Esmann, Knud (29 March 2009). "Ærens grusomme pris". Jyllands-Posten (in Danish).
