= György Kapocsi =

Hungarian boxer (1922–1999)

Personal information
- Nationality: Hungarian
- Born: 20 December 1922; Barcs, Hungary
- Died: 25 January 1999 (aged 76); Budapest, Hungary

Sport
- Sport: Boxing

György Kapocsi (20 December 1922 – 25 January 1999) was a Hungarian boxer. He competed in the men's light heavyweight event at the 1948 Summer Olympics. At the 1948 Summer Olympics, he lost to Don Scott of Great Britain.
