= Zaczyk =

Zaczyk is a surname. Notable people with the surname include:

- Klaus Zaczyk (born 1945), German footballer
- Stanisław Zaczyk (1923–1985), Polish actor
- Teodor Zaczyk (1900–1990), Polish fencer
