= Jimmy Carruthers =

Australian boxer (1929–1990)

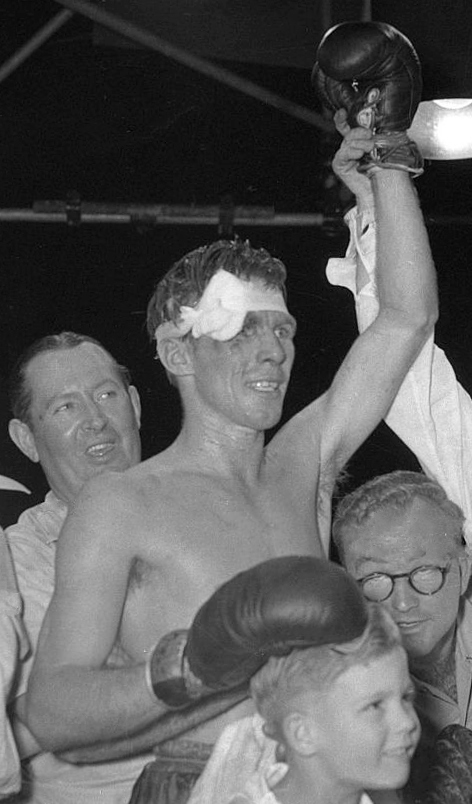
- Carruthers after defending World Bantamweight title against Gualt on 13 November 1953

Personal information
- Nationality: Australian
- Born: James William Carruthers; 5 July 1929 Paddington, New South Wales
- Died: 15 August 1990 (aged 61) Sydney, New South Wales
- Height: 5 ft 6 in (1.68 m)
- Weight: Bantamweight

Boxing career
- Reach: 67 in (170 cm)
- Stance: Southpaw

Boxing record
- Total fights: 25
- Wins: 21
- Win by KO: 13
- Losses: 4

James William Carruthers (5 July 1929 – 15 August 1990) was an Australian boxer, who became the Undisputed Bantamweight World Champion in 1952.

Jimmy was the 2009 Inductee for the Australian National Boxing Hall of Fame Veterans category.

== Amateur career ==
Carruthers's boxing career started as an Australian representative at the 1948 Summer Olympics in London. In his first-round match of the bantamweight competition, he fought Fred Daigle of Canada and won on points. He defeated Arnoldo Parés of Argentina in his second match. However, he had sustained an eye injury during his bout with Parés, and had to withdraw from the quarter-final match with the eventual gold medalist Tibor Csík of Hungary.

== Professional career ==
Carruthers joined the professional ranks in 1950, and was an immediate success. By then, he was being managed by Dr. Jim McGirr, and trained by "Silent" Bill McConnell.

He won the Australian Bantamweight title in 1951 and then the British Commonwealth and Bantamweight Championship of the world the following year. Carruthers became Australia's first universally recognised boxing world champion when he knocked out the guy who had been crowned South Africa's first world champion himself, Vic Toweel, in the first round. Great Australians of the past—including Young Griffo, Mick King, and Les Darcy—had all won world titles, but they had not received international acceptance at the time of winning their respective crowns. After defending his newly won world bantamweight title by knocking out Toweel in the tenth round of their rematch at Johannesburg, and then against the American Henry "Pappy" Gault in Sydney, by a fifteen-rounds decision, it was found that Carruthers was carrying a 30-foot-long tapeworm.

He was matched for a world title bout against the New Zealand Bantamweight Champion Lyn Philp. For unclear reasons the fight never went ahead.

After a non-title bout in Sydney, and a further title defence against Chamroen Songkitrat in Bangkok, Carruthers retired on 16 May 1954. Among the fighters he defeated were South African Vic Toweel (twice); Pappy Gault; Bobby Sinn and Chamroen Songkitrat. He made a brief comeback in Melbourne and Sydney in the early sixties in non-title fights, with his last fight in Wellington New Zealand in 1962 where he lost to Jimmy Cassidy.

== Personal ==
He worked on the Sydney docks as a wharf labourer in the 1950s.

Carruthers was married to Myra (née Hamilton) until his death and is survived by four children - Boyd, Ginna, Dimiette and Lukas. During the 1950s he owned the colourful Bells Hotel in Sydney's Woolloomooloo. After that he had a number of businesses, including several vegetarian takeaway and juice bars in Sydney.

In his last years Carruthers suffered from lung cancer and Parkinson's disease. He died on 15 August 1990. In 1995 he was inducted into the World Boxing Hall of Fame.

== Professional boxing record ==
25 fights	21 wins	4 losses
By knockout	13	1
By decision	8	2
By disqualification	0	1

No.	Result	Record	Opponent	Type	Round	Date	Location	Notes
25	Loss	21–4	(New Zealand) Jimmy Cassidy	DQ	8 (10)	Jun 18, 1962	Town Hall, Wellington, New Zealand	
24	Win	21–3	(Australia) Johnny Jarrett	TKO	2 (12)	Mar 29, 1962	Woodville, South Australia, Australia	
23	Win	20–3	(Australia) Louis Magnifico	KO	2 (12)	Mar 9, 1962	Adelaide, South Australia, Australia	
22	Loss	19–3	(United States) Don Johnson	TKO	5 (12)	Dec 15, 1961	Festival Hall, Melbourne, Victoria, Australia	
21	Loss	19–2	(Australia) Wally Taylor	PTS	12	Nov 20, 1961	Sydney Stadium, Sydney, New South Wales, Australia	
20	Loss	19–1	(Italy) Aldo Pravisani	PTS	12	Sep 11, 1961	Sydney Stadium, Sydney, New South Wales, Australia	
19	Win	19–0	(Thailand) Chamroen Songkitrat	PTS	12	May 2, 1954	National Stadium Gymnasium, Bangkok, Thailand	Retained NBA, NYSAC, and The Ring bantamweight titles
18	Win	18–0	(Australia) Bobby Sinn	PTS	12	Mar 29, 1954	Sydney Stadium, Sydney, New South Wales, Australia	
17	Win	17–0	(United States) Pappy Gault	UD	15	Nov 13, 1953	Sydney Sports Ground, Sydney, New South Wales, Australia	Retained NBA, NYSAC, and The Ring bantamweight titles
16	Win	16–0	(Union of South Africa) Vic Toweel	KO	10 (15)	Mar 21, 1953	(Union of South Africa) Rand Stadium, Johannesburg, Gauteng, South Africa	Retained NBA, NYSAC, Commonwealth British Empire, and The Ring bantamweight titles
15	Win	15–0	(Union of South Africa) Vic Toweel	KO	1 (15)	Nov 15, 1952	(Union of South Africa) Rand Stadium, Johannesburg, Gauteng, South Africa	Won NBA, NYSAC, Commonwealth British Empire, and The Ring bantamweight titles
14	Win	14–0	(United States) Johnny O'Brien	PTS	12	May 12, 1952	Sydney Stadium, Sydney, New South Wales, Australia	
13	Win	13–0	(Australia) Ray Coleman	PTS	12	Apr 7, 1952	Sydney Stadium, Sydney, New South Wales, Australia	
12	Win	12–0	(Australia) Taffy Sammy Hancock	TKO	7 (12)	Mar 13, 1952	Leichhardt Stadium, Sydney, New South Wales, Australia	
11	Win	11–0	(Mexico) Luis Castillo	PTS	12	Nov 26, 1951	Sydney Stadium, Sydney, New South Wales, Australia	
10	Win	10–0	(United States) Enrique Morales	TKO	7 (12)	Aug 27, 1951	Sydney Stadium, Sydney, New South Wales, Australia	
9	Win	9–0	(Australia) Elley Bennett	PTS	15	May 14, 1951	Sydney Stadium, Sydney, New South Wales, Australia	Won vacant Australian bantamweight title
8	Win	8–0	(United States) Billy Herbert	TKO	10 (12)	Apr 2, 1951	Sydney Stadium, Sydney, New South Wales, Australia	
7	Win	7–0	(French protectorate of Tunisia) Bobby Scrivano	KO	1 (12)	Mar 5, 1951	Sydney Stadium, Sydney, New South Wales, Australia	
6	Win	6–0	(Australia) Bluey Wilkins	PTS	12	Jan 22, 1951	Sydney Stadium, Sydney, New South Wales, Australia	
5	Win	5–0	(Australia) Jim McFadden	TKO	9 (12)	Dec 11, 1950	Sydney Stadium, Sydney, New South Wales, Australia	
4	Win	4–0	(Australia) Keith Francis	TKO	10 (12)	Nov 20, 1950	Sydney Stadium, Sydney, New South Wales, Australia	
3	Win	3–0	(Australia) Fred Kay	TKO	12 (12)	Oct 19, 1950	Leichhardt Stadium, Sydney, New South Wales, Australia	
2	Win	2–0	(Australia) Ron Wilson	TKO	5 (12)	Oct 13, 1950	West Melbourne Stadium, Melbourne, Victoria, Australia	
1	Win	1–0	(Australia) Ted Fitzgerald	TKO	3 (12)	Aug 15, 1950	Leichhardt Stadium, Sydney, New South Wales, Australia	

== Titles in boxing ==
=== Major world titles ===
- NYSAC bantamweight champion (118 lbs)
- NBA (WBA) bantamweight champion (118 lbs)

=== The Ring magazine titles ===
- The Ring bantamweight champion (118 lbs)

=== Regional/International titles ===
- Australian bantamweight champion (118 lbs)
- Commonwealth bantamweight champion (118 lbs)

=== Undisputed titles ===
- Undisputed bantamweight champion

== See also ==
- List of bantamweight boxing champions

Achievements
Previous: Vic Toweel	World Bantamweight Champion; 15 November 1952 - 16 May 1954; Retired	Vacant Title next held by Robert Cohen
