= Roger Behm =

Luxembourgish boxer

Roger Behm (25 March 1929, in Luxembourg City – 30 November 2005) was a boxer from Luxembourg.

Behm was a member of the Luxembourgish Olympic boxing team at the 1948 Summer Olympics in London. He was eliminated in the first round of the bantamweight competition on points by the Irishman Willie Lenihan.
