= Willie Lenihan =

Irish boxer (1921–2009)

Personal information
- Nationality: Irish
- Born: 17 May 1921
- Died: 27 May 2009 (aged 88); Ashbourne, Ireland

Sport
- Sport: Boxing

William Lenihan (17 May 1921 – 27 May 2009) was an Irish boxer. He competed in the men's bantamweight event at the 1948 Summer Olympics.
