= Mauro Cía =

Argentine boxer (1919–1990)

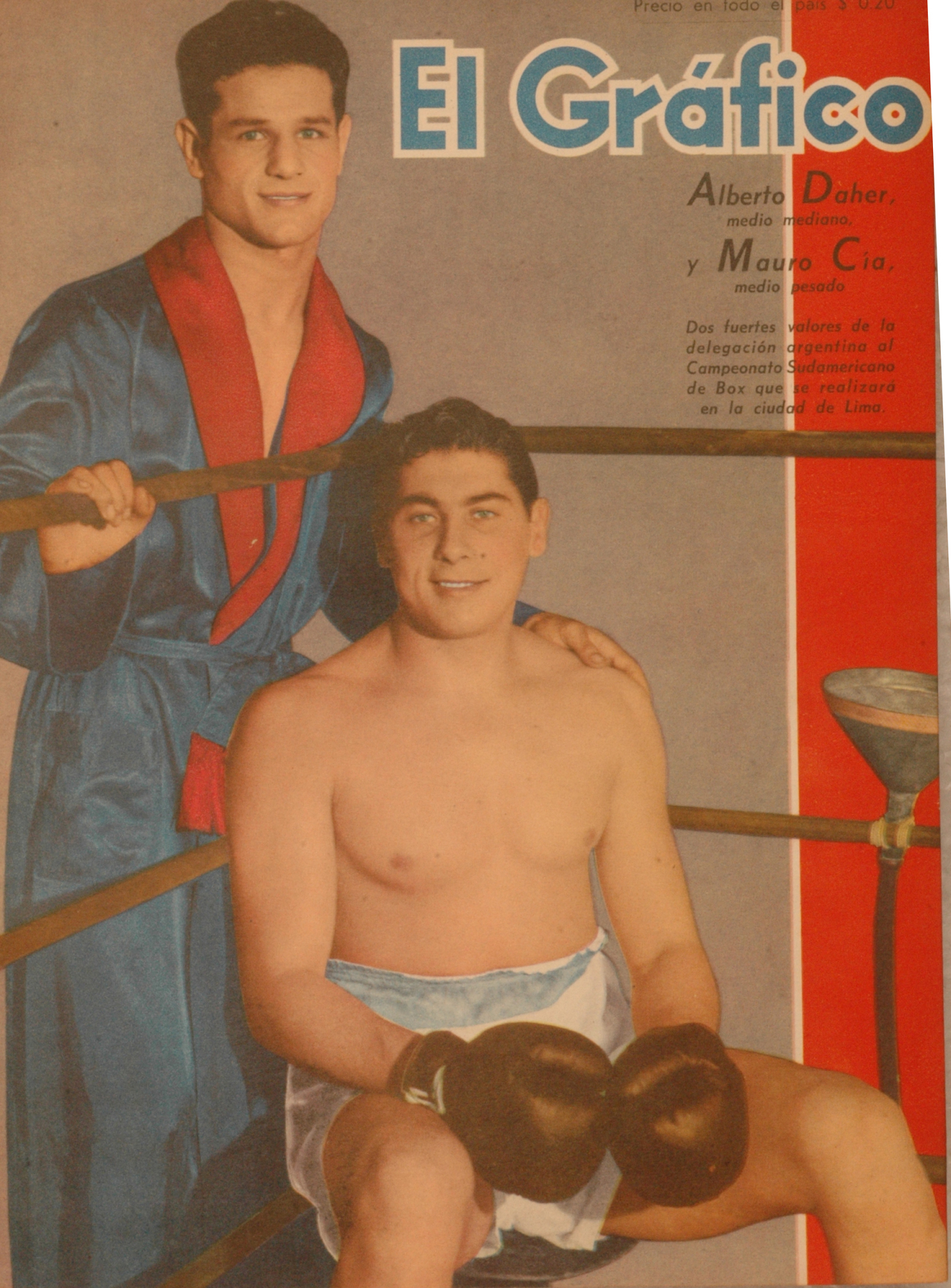
- Cía (seated) on the cover of El Gráfico.

Medal record

Men's Boxing

Representing Argentina

Olympic Games
Bronze medal – third place	1948 London	Light-heavyweight

Gualberto Mauro Cía Montañero (3 July 1919 – 3 January 1990) was an Argentine boxer and actor. He was born in Buenos Aires. At the age of 29, when he was an assistant officer at the Argentine Federal Police, Cía qualified for the 1948 Summer Olympics held in London, United Kingdom in the light heavyweight classification. In a campaign marked by increasing injuries, Cía managed to attain the bronze medal despite the coaching staff not wanting to clear him for the third-place match, as he had two swollen black eyes, cuts in the cheeks and eyebrows, and a right hand so swollen the boxing glove did not fit. Afterwards, Cía had no interest in becoming a professional boxer, retiring to take care of his sick mother while also becoming a sparring partner for Archie Moore. After a brief acting career in the boxing-themed films Su última pelea (1949), Diez segundos (1949) and Nace un campeón (1952), Cía unsuccessfully attempted to qualify for the 1956 Summer Olympics Cía is deceased.

== 1948 Olympic record ==
- Round of 32: defeated Hennie Quentemeijer (Netherlands) on points
- Round of 16: defeated Felipe Posse (Uruguay) by disqualification in the third round
- Quarterfinal: defeated Franciszek Szymura (Poland) on points
- Semifinal: lost to George Hunter (South Africa) on points
- Bronze Medal Bout: defeated Adrian Holmes (Australia) referee stopped contest in the third round (was awarded bronze medal)
