= Celestino González =

Chilean boxer (1926–2009)

Celestino González Henriquez
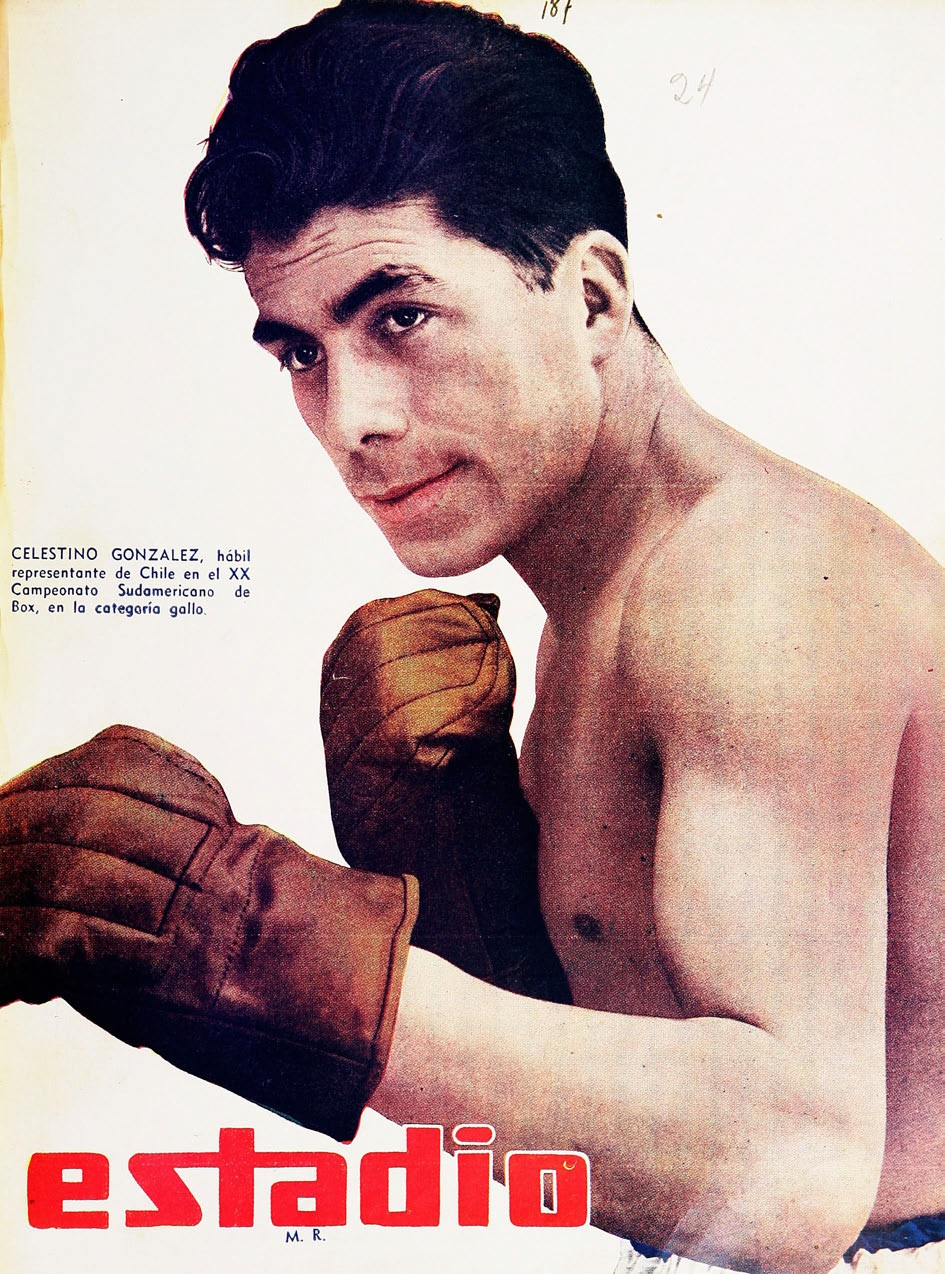

Personal information
- Nationality: Chilean
- Born: 2 March 1926
- Died: 2 July 2009 (aged 83); Independencia, Chile

Sport
- Sport: Boxing

Celestino González (2 March 1926 – 2 July 2009) was a Chilean boxer. He competed in the men's bantamweight event at the 1948 Summer Olympics.
