= Sara Rosario =

Puerto Rican sports executive

President of the Puerto Rico Olympic Committee
- In office December 2012 – Incumbent
- Preceded by: David Bernier

Personal details
- Born: Bayamon, Puerto Rico
- Education: Universidad Metropolitana (BA)

Sara Rosario Vélez (born in Bayamon, Puerto Rico) is a Puerto Rican sports executive who has served as the President of the Puerto Rico Olympic Committee (COPUR) since 2012. Rosario is the first woman to hold the presidency of COPUR.

In 2025, she remained Puerto Rico Olympic Committee President.

== Early life and education ==
Sara Rosario Vélez graduated with a B.A. degree in Business administration, with a concentration in accounting, from the Universidad Metropolitana in Puerto Rico.

== Sports administration career ==
Rosario has been involved in sports since 1987. She became a member of the Puerto Rico Olympic Committee, or COPUR, in 1991. She served as the Chef de Mission for the Puerto Rican Olympic team at the 2004 Summer Olympics in Athens, Greece.

In November 2012, David Bernier, the incumbent COPUR president since 2008, announced his resignation after he was appointed Secretary of State of Puerto Rico by incoming Governor-elect Alejandro García Padilla. COPUR elected Sara Rosario as its new president in early December 2012, three weeks after Bernier's announced his intention to step. Rosario became the first woman to lead COPUR since the committee's creation in 1948. In a press release issued shortly after her election, Rosario thanked the committee members, writing "“I'm pleased and very happy to be chosen as the first woman president of the Puerto Rico Olympic Committee. All my life I've worked for the Olympics. Being president of the Olympic Committee was never a goal of mine, but the chance came along and I took it."

Rosario also stated that one of the main priorities of COPUR would be to win Puerto Rico's first ever gold medal at the forthcoming 2016 Summer Olympics in Rio de Janeiro. Four years later, tennis player Monica Puig became the first athlete to win an Olympic gold medal while representing Puerto Rico. Puig won her gold medal in Tennis at the 2016 Summer Olympics – Women's Singles. Sara Rosario Velez was in the crowd and celebrated with Puig.

In May 2016, Rosario was elected to the Association of National Olympic Committees' (ANOC) Executive Council as a representative of the Pan American Sports Organization (PASO). She replaced Marcel Aubut, who resigned from the Executive Council in November 2016 due to allegations of sexual harassment. Rosario's election to the 31-member ANOC Executive Council brought the number of woman on the council to nine.

In 2020, she was the only candidate for another term as COPUR president. After being selected, she ran again for another four year term in September 2024. In 2025, she remained Puerto Rico Olympic Committee President. She retained the role as of June 2026 as well.
