= Arnoldo Parés =

Argentine boxer (born 1922)

Personal information
- Nationality: Argentine
- Born: 1922

Sport
- Sport: Boxing

Arnoldo Parés (born 1922) is an Argentine boxer who competed in the 1948 Summer Olympics in the bantamweight, he beat Vic Toweel in the first round on points, but then lost to British boxer Jimmy Carruthers on points.
