= Vital L'Hoste =

Belgian boxer

Personal information
- Nationality: Belgian
- Born: 6 June 1925; Walloon Brabant, Belgium
- Died: 26 March 2011 (aged 85)

Sport
- Sport: Boxing

Vital L'Hoste (6 June 1925 – 26 March 2011) was a Belgian boxer. He competed in the men's light heavyweight event at the 1948 Summer Olympics.
