= Saw Hardy =

Burmese boxer (born 1916)

Personal information
- Nationality: Burmese
- Born: 1916

Sport
- Sport: Boxing

Saw Hardy (born 1916, date of death unknown) was a Burmese boxer. He competed in the men's bantamweight event at the 1948 Summer Olympics. Hardy is deceased.
