= Héctor Martínez Arteche =

Mexican artist (1934–2011)

Héctor Martínez Arteche (1934 – October 3, 2011) was a Mexican painter and muralist.

He was born in Mexico City, but spent most of his life in the state of Sonora. Most of his mural work can be seen in Hermosillo, Ciudad Obregón and Navojoa, totalling more than 4,000 meters squared. These include Energía, evolución y movimiento, La evolución mística del hombre venado, El universo del hombre, El pueblo de Cajeme and Comunicación I. In addition to this artwork, he has also had a long teaching career, which began in 1948 at the Escuela Nacional de Artes Plásticas at UNAM. His best known oils include Mujer con violeta and Mujer con cobalto.

Martinez Artech's work has received recognitions such as Concurso Nacional de Pintura Mural in 1953, Medalla de Plata from the state of Sonora in 1992 and was honored by the city of Cajeme for his artistic and teaching work in 2002. He was honored as the Creador Emérito for 2008–2009 for the Region Sur de Sonora.

Martinez Artech died on October 3, 2011, in Ciudad Obregón; he was 77.
