= Harry Siljander =

Finnish boxer

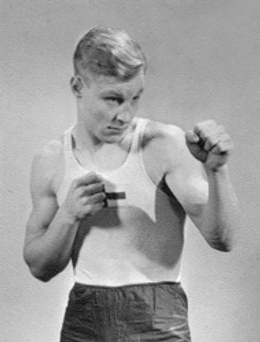

Personal information
- Nationality: Finnish
- Born: 10 December 1922 Helsinki, Finland
- Died: 5 May 2010 (aged 87) Espoo, Finland
- Height: 176 cm (5 ft 9 in)
- Weight: 75–84 kg (165–185 lb)

Sport
- Sport: Boxing
- Weight class: Light heavyweight
Medal record
Representing Finland
Olympic Games
Bronze medal – third place	1952 Helsinki	Light-heavyweight

Harry Valfrid Siljander (10 December 1922 – 5 May 2010) was a Finnish light-heavyweight boxer who competed in the 1948 and 1952 Olympics. In 1948 he lost in a quarterfinal to the eventual champion George Hunter, and placed fifth. Four years later he reached a semifinal, where he again lost to the eventual winner, Norvel Lee; yet he earned a bronze medal.

Siljander first trained in speed skating and swimming; he changed to boxing in 1940 while serving in the Finnish Army. In 1943 he won the Army Championships and in 1946 placed second at the national championships. In 1947 he moved from middleweight to light-heavyweight and won five Finnish titles in 1947–50 and 1952. He retired in 1952 and later worked as a butcher in Helsinki until 1986. In 2005 he was inducted into the Finnish Boxing Hall of Fame.

== 1952 Olympic results ==
Below are the results of Harry (Harri) Siljander who competed in the 1952 Olympics in Helsinki as a light heavyweight boxer:

- Round of 32: bye
- Round of 16: defeated Dumitru Ciobotaru (Romania) by a 2-1 decision.
- Quarterfinal: defeated Karl Kistner (Germany) by a 2-1 decision
- Semifinal: lost to Norvel Lee (United States) by a 0-3 decision; was awarded a bronze medal
