= Bonifacio Zarcal =

Filipino boxer

Personal information
- Nationality: Filipino
- Born: January 13, 1920 Manila, Philippine Islands
- Died: April 3, 1993 (aged 73)

Sport
- Sport: Boxing
- Weight class: Bantamweight

Bonifacio Leoncio Zarcal (January 13, 1920 – April 3, 1993) was a Filipino amateur boxer. He competed in the men's bantamweight event at the 1948 Summer Olympics.
