= Hennie Quentemeijer =

Dutch boxer

Heinrich ("Hennie" or "Henk") Quentemeijer (1 January 1920 in Rheine, Germany – 22 April 1974 in Sydney, Australia) was a heavyweight boxer, who represented the Netherlands at the 1948 Summer Olympics in London, United Kingdom. There he was eliminated in the first round of the men's light heavyweight (– 80 kg) division by eventual bronze medalist Mauro Cía from Argentina.

== 1948 Olympic results ==
Below are the results of Hennie Quentemeijer, a light heavy weight boxer from the Netherlands who competed at the 1948 London Olympics:

- Round of 32: lost to Mauro Cia (Argentina) by points
