= Osvaldo Gil =

Puerto Rican sports executive

President of the Puerto Rico Olympic Committee
- In office 1976; 1990 – 1991
- Preceded by: Germán Rieckehoff
- Succeeded by: Héctor Cardona

President of the Puerto Rico Baseball Federation
- In office 1970–2002
- Preceded by: Carlos Rosario Esquilín
- Succeeded by: Israel Roldán

Personal details
- Born: Osvaldo Luis Gil Bosch; August 25, 1932 Guayama, Puerto Rico
- Died: March 30, 2025 (aged 92) San Juan, Puerto Rico
- Spouse: Leticia López
- Education: University of Puerto Rico (BA); University of Richmond School of Law (JD)

Military service
- Branch/service: United States Army
- Rank: Captain
- Battles/wars: Korean War

Osvaldo Luis Gil Bosch (August 25, 1932– March 30, 2025) was a Puerto Rican lawyer and sports executive who chaired the Puerto Rico Olympic Committee and the Puerto Rico Baseball Federation.

== Early years ==
Osvaldo Luis Gil Bosch was born on August 25, 1932 in Guayama, Puerto Rico, as one of four children. Osvaldo arrived in Humacao, Puerto Rico at the age of three. He studied in the public schools of Humacao, where he actively participated in the basketball, volleyball, athletics, softball, and of course baseball teams. He completed his high school education at UPR, where he participated in the baseball and softball teams. He earned a Bachelor of Arts from the University of Puerto Rico. Served in the Korean War with United States Army as a Captain infantry officer. He went on to the University of Richmond School of Law and got a Juris Doctor degree, and upon his return, he established his law firm in Humacao. He was a member of the Phi Eta Mu fraternity. He married Leticia López.

== Career in sports ==
He played catcher for the Humacao Grises in the Puerto Rico Superior Double-A League and also helped Puerto Rico win the 1951 Amateur World Series held in Mexico City, Mexico. On January 4, 1970, he was elected president of the Amateur Baseball Circuit. For 33 years, he was president of the Baseball Federation. He served as vice president of the Olympic Committee for 17 years and held the position of president of the Puerto Rico Olympic Committee in 1976 and from 1990 to 1991. Gil was the head of delegation for all of Puerto Rico's Olympic delegations from 1976 to 1991, except for the 1980 Summer Olympics in Russia. He was a member of the Organizing committee of the 1979 Pan American Games.

== Death ==
Osvaldo Luis Gil Bosch died on March 30, 2025 aged 92 after suffering from throat cancer. He was buried at the Luis Roldán López Rosario Municipal Cemetery in Humacao, Puerto Rico.

== Honors and recognition ==
He was inducted into the Puerto Rican Sports Hall of Fame in 1993. In 2000 Osvaldo Gil was inducted to the Humacao Sports Pavilion Hall of Fame. On December 15, 2002, the then Secretary of Recreation and Sports, George Rosario, honored him by establishing the Osvaldo Gil Bosch award at the annual Youth Values in Sports awards ceremony. In October 2002, the House of Representatives of Puerto Rico held a Special Session to recognize his contributions to sports in Puerto Rico. In 2018 he was inducted to the Río Piedras Sports Hall of Fame. A sports complex in Humacao, Puerto Rico was named in his honor.
