= Jean-Marie Grenot =

French boxer

Personal information
- Nationality: French
- Born: 28 March 1929; Lyon, France
- Died: 15 January 1997 (aged 67); Saint-Genis-Laval, France

Sport
- Sport: Boxing

Jean-Marie Grenot (28 March 1929 – 15 January 1997) was a French boxer. He competed in the men's bantamweight event at the 1948 Summer Olympics.
