= Salvador Rivera =

Peruvian boxer (1928–2025)

Personal information
- Full name: Salvador Rivera Sáenz
- Nationality: Peruvian
- Born: 4 November 1928 Yanque, Peru
- Died: 5 January 2025 (aged 96) Orlando, Florida, U.S.

Sport
- Sport: Boxing

Salvador Rivera Sáenz (4 November 1928 – 5 January 2025) was a Peruvian boxer. He competed in the men's bantamweight event at the 1948 Summer Olympics. Rivera died in Orlando, Florida on 5 January 2025, at the age of 96.
