= Fred Daigle =

Canadian boxer (1930–2025)

Personal information
- Born: 9 September 1930; Montreal, Quebec, Canada
- Died: 26 May 2025 (aged 94); Toronto, Canada

Sport
- Sport: Boxing

Frederick William Daigle (9 September 1930 – 26 May 2025) was a Canadian boxer. He competed in the men's bantamweight event at the 1948 Summer Olympics. Daigle died on 26 May 2025, at the age of 94.

== 1948 Olympic results ==
Below is the record of Fred Daigle, a Canadian bantamweight boxer who competed at the 1948 London Olympic Games:

- Round of 32: lost to Jimmy Carruthers (Australia) by disqualification in the second round.
