= Chuck Spieser =

American boxer (1929–1996)

Personal information
- Full name: Charles William Spieser
- Born: August 2, 1929 Detroit, Michigan, U.S.
- Died: December 21, 1996 (aged 67) South Lyon, Michigan, U.S.

Sport
- Sport: Boxing

Charles William Spieser (August 2, 1929 – December 21, 1996) was an American boxer. He competed in the men's light heavyweight event at the 1948 Summer Olympics.
