= Chamroen Songkitrat =

Thai boxer

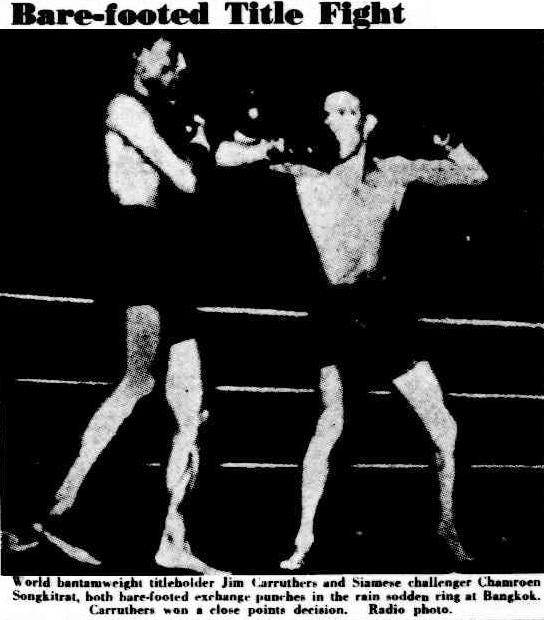
- Chamroen Songkitrat (left) and Jimmy Carruthers (right) in heavy rain during their fight on May 2, 1954.

Personal information
- Nicknames: Samroeung Narupai; Jinglen fai (จิ้งเหลนไฟ) "Fire Skink"
- Nationality: Thai
- Born: Pol. Maj. Samroeng Srimadi (พ.ต.ต.สำเริง ศรีมาดี); October 20, 1928 Nong Khai province, Thailand
- Died: August 29, 2003 (aged 74) Bangkok, Thailand
- Height: 163 cm (5 ft 4 in)
- Weight: Bantamweight; Featherweight; Lightweight

Boxing career
- Reach: 155 cm (61 in)
- Stance: Orthodox

Boxing record
- Total fights: 16
- Wins: 9
- Win by KO: 2
- Losses: 5
- Draws: 2

Chamroen Songkitrat (Thai: จำเริญ ทรงกิตรัตน์), born as Samroeng Srimadi, was a Thai boxer and policeman. Songkitrat was a champion Muay Thai fighter in Thailand with over 50 fights before becoming an orthodox boxer. He made two unsuccessful attempts at the NBA World Bantamweight title to Jimmy Carruthers and Robert Cohen in May and September 1954, both to audiences over 60,000. He is considered the first Thai boxer to have the opportunity to challenge for a World Champion, his fight with Jimmy Carruthers on May 2, 1954 was also the first world-class professional boxing event that took place in Thailand.

== Career ==
On December 30, 1949, Songkitrat debuted against Mok Kai Khoon in the Happy World Arena, Singapore.

The first time he challenged the World Champion was against Australian Jimmy Carruthers on May 2, 1954, at the National Stadium (Suphachalasai Stadium). More than 60,000 spectators attended, including King Bhumibol and Queen Sirikit of Thailand Songkitrat was sponsored partly by the Royal Thai Police Department. The stadium was open-roofed, and as it was monsoon season and raining, both competitors fought barefoot and were forced to dodge falling light globes as they exploded from gusts of wind. This is the first recorded match in modern world boxing history where boxers removed their boots.

On September 19, 1954, Songkitrat challenged World Champion Robert Cohen at the National Stadium (Suphachalasai Stadium). His nose was broken during the seventh round, but he fought on, only to lose through points after 15 rounds.

On March 9, 1955, he fought Raúl Macías at Cow Palace, in California, and lost.

After retiring from boxing, he continued to work as a police officer. Upon quitting the force, Songkitrat spent time working in France before returning to Bangkok. He opened a business in Chiang Mai, but after becoming paralyzed he returned to Bangkok. He died there on August 29, 2003, at the age of 74.

== Professional boxing record ==
16 fights	9 wins	5 losses
By knockout	2	2
By decision	7	3
Draws	2	

No.	Result	Record	Opponent	Type	Round, time	Date	Location	Notes
16	Win	9–4–2	Baby Ross	PTS	10	Nov 18, 1955	Bangkok, Thailand	
15	Win	8–4–2	Masayuki Hasegawa	PTS	8	Apr 1, 1955	Bangkok, Thailand	
14	Loss	7–4–2	Billy Peacock	TKO	9 (10)	Oct 16, 1955	Rajadamnern Stadium, Bangkok, Thailand	
13	Win	6–4–2	Danny Kid	PTS	10	Sep 4, 1955	Bangkok, Thailand	
12	Loss	6–4–2	Raúl Macías	TKO	11 (12), 2:38	Mar 9, 1955	Cow Palace, Daly City, California, US	For vacant NBA bantamweight title
11	Loss	6–3–2	Robert Cohen	SD	15	Sep 19, 1955	National Stadium Gymnasium, Bangkok, Thailand	For vacant NYSAC, NBA, and The Ring bantamweight titles
10	Loss	6–2–2	Jimmy Carruthers	PTS	12	May 2, 1954	National Stadium Gymnasium, Bangkok, Thailand	For NYSAC, NBA, and The Ring bantamweight titles
9	Win	6–1–2	Kevin James	KO	6 (10)	Mar 29, 1954	Bangkok, Thailand	
8	Win	5–1–2	Pappy Gault	UD	10	Jan 10, 1954	Bangkok, Thailand	
7	Win	4–1–2	Jimmy Pearce	KO	1 (10)	Oct 13, 1953	Bangkok, Thailand	
6	Win	3–1–2	Masashi Akiyama	PTS	10	May 31, 1953	Bangkok, Thailand	
5	Win	2–1–2	Masashi Akiyama	PTS	12	Mar 1, 1953	Bangkok, Thailand	Retained PBF and Orient lightweight titles
4	Win	1–1–2	Speedy Cabanela	PTS	12	Oct 13, 1952	Rajadamnern Stadium, Bangkok, Thailand	Won vacant PBF and Orient lightweight titles
3	Loss	0–1–2	Larry Bataan	PTS	12	Jul 26, 1952	Rizal Memorial Coliseum, Manila, Philippines	For vacant Orient featherweight title
2	Draw	0–0–2	Tanny Campo	PTS	10	Nov 19, 1951	Bangkok, Thailand	
1	Draw	0–0–1	Mok Kai Khoon	PTS	8	Dec 30, 1949	Happy World Arena, Singapore	
