= Joseph Roude =

French boxer

Personal information
- Nationality: French
- Born: 18 December 1926; Freney, France
- Died: 5 December 1998 (aged 71); Villeurbanne, France

Sport
- Sport: Boxing

Joseph Emile Roude (18 December 1926 – 5 December 1998) was a French boxer. He competed in the men's light heavyweight event at the 1948 Summer Olympics. At the 1948 Summer Olympics, he lost to Israel Quitcón of Puerto Rico.
