= Otto Michtits =

Austrian boxer (born 1928)

Personal information
- Nationality: Austrian
- Born: 20 June 1928 (age 97)

Sport
- Sport: Boxing

Otto Michtits (born 20 June 1928) is an Austrian retired boxer. He competed in the men's light heavyweight event at the 1948 Summer Olympics.
