= Tibor Csík =

Hungarian boxer (1927–1976)

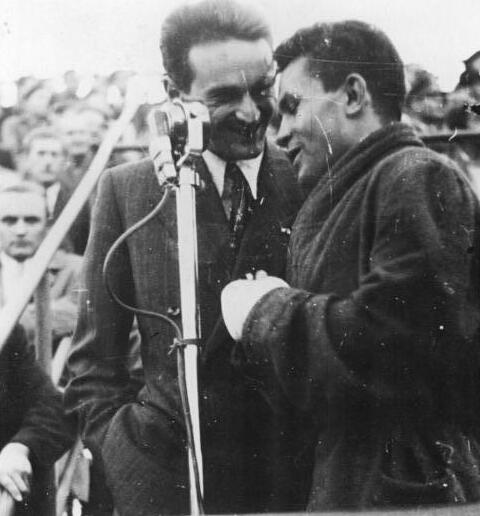
- Tibor Csík (right), being interviewed by György Szepesi, 1949

Medal record

Men's Boxing

Representing Hungary

Olympic Games
Gold medal – first place	1948 London	Bantamweight

Tibor Csík (2 September 1927 – 22 June 1976) was a bantamweight professional boxer from Hungary, who won the gold medal at the 1948 Summer Olympics.

== Biography ==
Csík was born in Jászberény into a poor family. He began boxing in featherweight and later changed to bantamweight. A two-time Hungarian champion from 1946 and 1948, his biggest success was the Olympic Games gold medal he won in London.

He had an easy route to the semi-finals, as his first opponent was disqualified, and his quarter final opponent Jimmy Carruthers of Australia, was forced to withdraw due to an eye injury. In the final, Csik won a decision over Giovanni Zuddas of Italy, to win the gold medal. After his return to Hungary he was awarded the honorary citizenship of Jászberény.

Csík actively participated in the Hungarian Revolution of 1956, which eventually was struck down by the invading Soviet Army and Csík had to flee Hungary. He settled in Australia, where he died in 1976. He was buried in Sydney.

== 1948 Olympic results ==
Below is the record of Tibor Csik who competed as a bantamweight at the 1948 Olympic boxing tournament in London:

- Round of 32: defeated Manoel do Nacsimento (Brazil) by disqualification in round 2
- Round of 16: defeated Santiago Rivera (Peru) on points
- Quarterfinal: defeated Jimmy Carruthers (Australia) by walkover
- Semifinal: defeated Juan Evangelista Venegas (Puerto Rico) on points
- Final: defeated Giovanni Zuddas (Italy) on points (won gold medal)
