= Otakar Rademacher =

Czech boxer

Personal information
- Nationality: Czech
- Born: 4 July 1926 Dvůr Králové nad Labem, Czechoslovakia
- Died: 19 October 1991 (aged 65)

Sport
- Sport: Boxing

Otakar Rademacher (4 July 1926 – 19 October 1991) was a Czech boxer and actor. He competed in the men's light heavyweight event at the 1948 Summer Olympics.
