= Edel Ojeda =

Mexican boxer (1928–2011)

Edel Ojeda Malpica (November 28, 1928 – April 1, 2011) was a Mexican professional boxer who competed from 1949 to 1957. As an amateur, he competed at the 1948 London Olympics. After retiring from boxing, he founded a successful commercial refrigeration company.
