= Jesús T. Piñero =

Puerto Rican politician (1897–1952)

Jesús Piñero
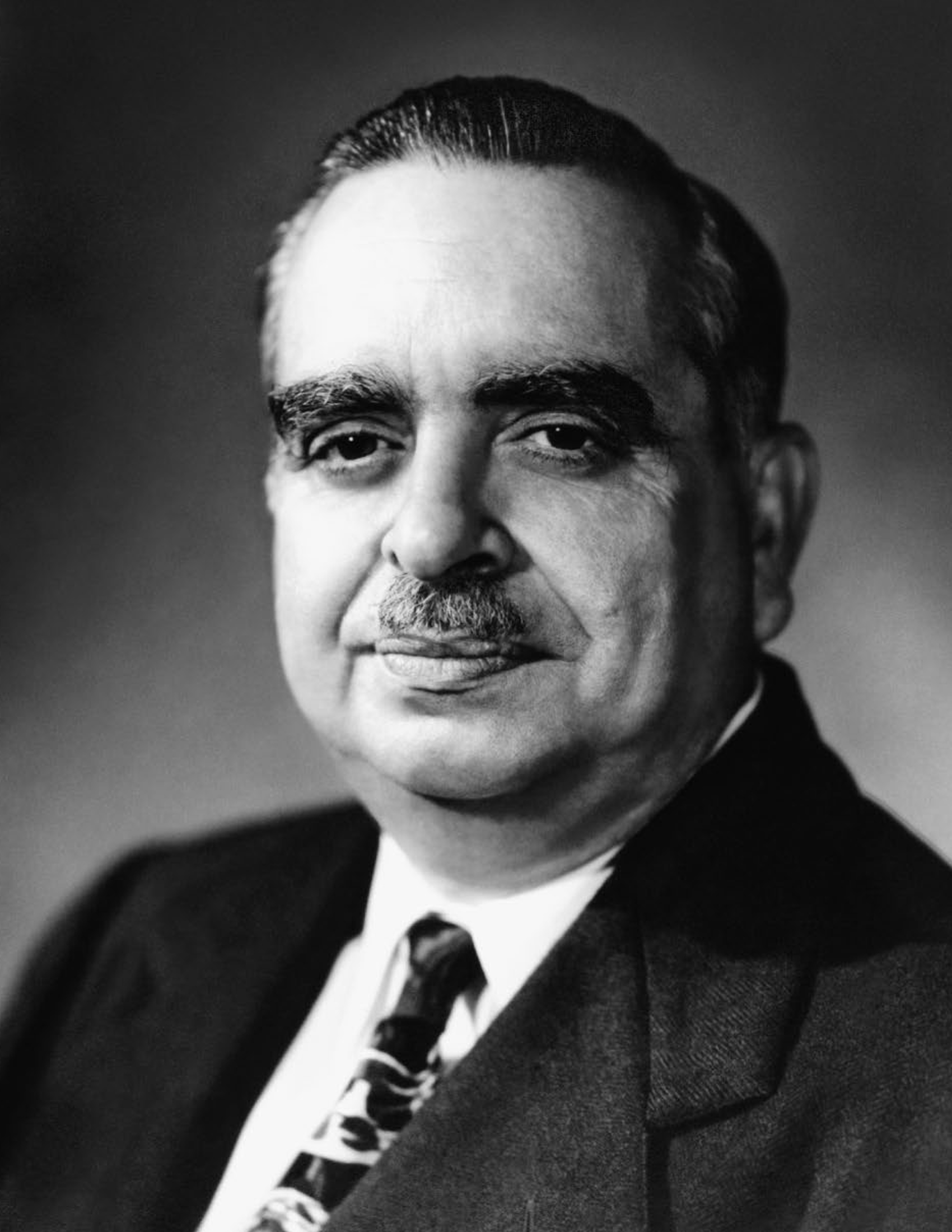
- Piñero in 1945

Governor of Puerto Rico
- In office September 2, 1946 – January 2, 1949
- Preceded by: Rexford Tugwell
- Succeeded by: Luis Muñoz Marín (elected)

Resident Commissioner of Puerto Rico
- In office January 3, 1945 – September 2, 1946
- Preceded by: Bolívar Pagán
- Succeeded by: Antonio Fernós-Isern

President of the Puerto Rico Olympic Committee
- In office 1948–1952
- Succeeded by: Julio Enrique Monagas

Personal details
- Born: Jesús Toribio Piñero Jiménez; April 16, 1897 Carolina, Captaincy General of Puerto Rico
- Died: November 19, 1952 (aged 55) Loíza, Puerto Rico
- Party: Popular Democratic
- Other political affiliations: Democratic
- Spouse: Aurelia Bou Ledesma
- Children: 2
- Education: University of Pennsylvania (attended); University of Puerto Rico (BA)

Jesús Toribio Piñero Jiménez (April 16, 1897 – November 19, 1952) was a Puerto Rican businessman and politician, who served by order of U.S. President Harry S. Truman as the 175th governor of Puerto Rico from 1946 to 1949. Piñero was the last appointed governor of the archipelago and island, as he was succeeded by Luis Muñoz Marín, who became the first popularly elected governor in 1948. Piñero was the first and only native Puerto Rican to hold the office in a formal, not interim capacity during the direct Spanish and American control of the governorship from 1508 to 1948.

== Early years ==
Jesús Toribio Piñero Jiménez was born in Carolina, Puerto Rico, to Emilio Piñero Estrella (son of Basilio Piñero) and Josefa Jiménez Sicardó into a wealthy family with roots in the Canary Islands. His direct ancestor was Domingo Antonio José Piñero Pineda from Hermigua, La Gomera, who arrived in Puerto Rico around 1816. He obtained his primary and secondary education in his hometown. In 1914, he attended the College of Liberal Arts of the University of Puerto Rico. He also attended the School of Engineering at the University of Pennsylvania in Philadelphia.

== Political career ==
Between 1920 and 1944, Piñero's interest in agriculture kept him engaged in the dairy business and in the cultivation of sugar cane. His interest in the agricultural development of Puerto Rico led him to participate in politics, particularly those concerning the issues of the cultivation of sugar cane and development of the industry.

Between 1928 and 1932, a period during which Puerto Rico's internal government was still run by continental Americans appointed by the President of the United States, Piñero was president of the Assembly of the Municipality of Carolina. Between 1934 and 1937, he was the president of the Association of the Sugar Cane Industry and was elected to the House of Representatives of Puerto Rico.

In 1938, Piñero was one of the founders, along with Luis Muñoz Marín, of the Partido Popular Democrático (PPD). In the elections of 1940, he was elected to the House of Representatives. In 1944, he was elected as Resident Commissioner of Puerto Rico, and represented the island in the United States House of Representatives in Washington, D.C. His position did not have voting powers in Congress.

== First Puerto Rican governor appointed by the U.S. ==
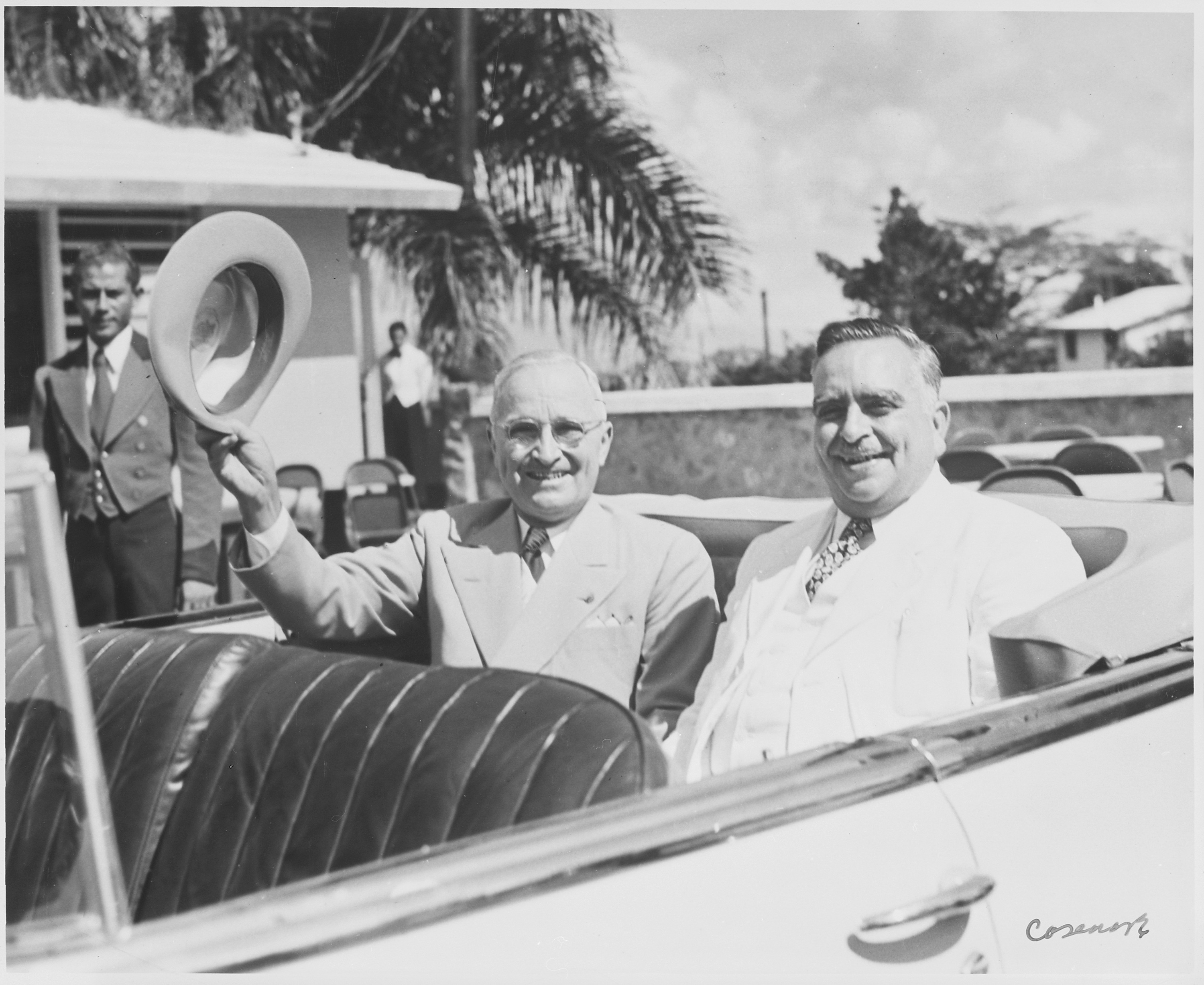
Piñero (on right) with Truman

In 1946, President Harry S. Truman relieved Governor Rexford Guy Tugwell, who had served in this position from 1941, and named Piñero as governor in his place, the first native Puerto Rican appointed to that post under U.S. administration.

On May 21, 1948, a bill was introduced before the Puerto Rican Senate which would restrain the rights of the independence and Nationalist movements on the archipelago. The Senate, controlled by the PPD and presided by Luis Muñoz Marín, approved the bill that day. This bill, which resembled the anti-communist Smith Act passed in the United States in 1940, became known as the Ley de la Mordaza (Gag Law) when Governor Piñero signed it into law on June 10, 1948. Under this new law it would be a crime to print, publish, sell, or exhibit any material intended to paralyze or destroy the insular government; or to organize any society, group or assembly of people with a similar destructive intent. It made it illegal to sing a patriotic song, and reinforced the 1898 law that had made it illegal to display the Flag of Puerto Rico, with anyone found guilty of disobeying the law in any way being subject to a sentence of up to ten years imprisonment, a fine of up to US$10,000 (equivalent to $134,000 in 2025), or both.

According to Dr. Leopoldo Figueroa, the only non-PPD member of the Puerto Rico House of Representatives, the law was repressive and was in violation of the First Amendment of the US Constitution which guarantees Freedom of Speech. He pointed out that the law as such was a violation of the civil rights of the people of Puerto Rico.

Piñero served as governor until 1949, when Puerto Rico celebrated its first popular election for the position, in which Muñoz Marín was elected governor. During Piñero's administration, legislation was passed that later served as the basis for the economic development plan known as Operation Bootstrap. Plans for the construction of a new international airport for the Island were also drawn up during his governorship. From 1947 to 1951, Piñero served as U.S. representative to the Caribbean Commission.

== Death ==
Jesús T. Piñero died on November 19, 1952, in the town of Loíza, and was buried at the Carolina Municipal Cemetery in his hometown, Carolina, Puerto Rico.

== Legacy and honors ==
- A high school, public housing complex, and a principal avenue in San Juan and in Cayey have been named for him.
- Carolina commissioned and installed a monument of him sculpted by Jose Buscaglia Guillermety; it is located at the entrance of the town. T
- The Agriculture building at the University of Puerto Rico at Mayagüez is also named after him.
- Piñero's personal papers and memorabilia are deposited at the Piñero Collection at the Universidad del Este in Carolina, Puerto Rico.

== See also ==
- List of Puerto Ricans
- List of Hispanic Americans in the United States Congress

U.S. House of Representatives
Preceded by Bolívar Pagán	Resident Commissioner of Puerto Rico; 1945–1946	Succeeded by Antonio Fernós-Isern
Political offices
Preceded by Rexford Tugwell	Governor of Puerto Rico; 1946–1949	Succeeded by Luis Muñoz Marín
