= Felipe Posse =

Uruguayan boxer

Personal information
- Full name: Felipe Tabaré Posse Suárez
- Born: 9 October 1925; Montevideo, Uruguay

Sport
- Sport: Boxing

Felipe Posse (born 9 October 1925) was a Uruguayan boxer. He competed in the men's light heavyweight event at the 1948 Summer Olympics.
