= Hugh O'Hagan =

Irish boxer

Personal information
- Nationality: Irish
- Born: 1920; Dublin, Ireland
- Died: 10 April 1984; Dublin, Ireland

Sport
- Sport: Boxing

Hugh Patrick O'Hagan (1920 – 10 April 1984) was an Irish boxer. He competed in the men's light heavyweight event at the 1948 Summer Olympics.
