= Israel Quitcón =

Puerto Rican boxer (1928–1977)

Personal information
- Nationality: Puerto Rican
- Born: 8 September 1928; Santurce, Puerto Rico
- Died: April 1977; San Juan, Puerto Rico

Sport
- Sport: Boxing

Israel Quitcón (8 September 1928 – April 1977) was a Puerto Rican boxer. He competed in the men's light heavyweight event at the 1948 Summer Olympics.
