= Emilio Huyke =

Puerto Rican journalist, boxing broadcaster, writer and sports executive

- Born: February 28, 1912; Humacao, Puerto Rico
- Died: December 17, 1983 (aged 71); Río Piedras, Puerto Rico
- Occupations: Sportsman, writer

Emilio E. Huyke Colón (February 28, 1912 – December 17, 1983) was a Puerto Rican writer, boxing television broadcaster and sports enthusiast. He was a sports administrator in the Caribbean, as the head of various sports organizations in the Caribbean area. He is a member of the Puerto Rican Sports Hall of Fame.

In Puerto Rico, Huyke is known as the "father of basketball" (in that nation).

== Career in sports ==
In 1930 he graduated at Central High School in Santurce, Puerto Rico. In 1936 he was the Secretary of the First Puerto Rican Olympics and in that same year he founded the Club de Futuro Estrellas del Baloncesto. In 1938 he was Secretary of the Basketball Commission of the Central American and Caribbean Zone. In 1937 Emilio founded the Insular Federation of Basketball, (F.I.B.) and Future Basketball Stars, action for which he was baptized as the Father of Puerto Rican Basketball. He was president of this Federation during the years 1937–1942, 1945–1946, 1981–1982.

He was then recruited to serve as Executive Secretary of the Professional Baseball League where he rose to Executive Vice President. In 1956 he founded the Fraternity of Sports Writers. In 1958 he was a member of the Constituent Assembly of the Puerto Rico Olympic Committee. He was Secretary General of the Puerto Rico Olympic Committee from 1964 to 1972 and in 1966 he was the President of the Organizing Committee of the X Central American and Caribbean Games held on the island.

== Death ==
He died on December 17, 1983, in Río Piedras, Puerto Rico, at the age of 71. He was buried at Buxeda Memorial Park Cemetery in Río Piedras, Puerto Rico.

== Legacy ==
The Emilio E. Huyke Coliseum in Humacao is named after him.

In 2000 Emilio Huyke was posthumously inducted to the Humacao Sports Pavilion Hall of Fame.

In addition, there is a Middle school named after him in San Juan.

== See also ==
- List of Puerto Ricans
