= Álvaro Vicente =

Spanish boxer (1928–2006)

Personal information
- Nationality: Spanish
- Born: 25 January 1928 Valencia, Spain
- Died: 14 January 2006 (aged 77)

Sport
- Sport: Boxing

Álvaro Vicente Doménech (25 January 1928 – 14 January 2006) was a Spanish boxer. He competed in the men's bantamweight event at the 1948 Summer Olympics. Vicente died on 14 January 2006, at the age of 77.
