= Mohamed El-Minabawi =

Egyptian boxer (1927–2004)

Personal information
- Nationality: Egyptian
- Born: 4 May 1927 Cairo, Egypt
- Died: 11 September 2004 (aged 77)

Sport
- Sport: Boxing

Mohamed El-Minabawi (4 May 1927 – 11 September 2004) was an Egyptian boxer. He competed at the 1948 Summer Olympics and the 1952 Summer Olympics. El-Minabawi died on 11 September 2004, at the age of 77.
