= Albert Perera =

Sri Lankan boxer (1918–1968)

Personal information
- Nationality: Sri Lankan
- Born: 22 December 1918 Colombo, Sri Lanka
- Died: 1 March 1968 (aged 49)

Boxing career
Medal record
Representing Ceylon
Men's Bantamweight
British Empire Games
Silver medal – second place	Auckland 1950	Bantamweight

Albert Perera (22 December 1918 – 1 March 1968) was a Sri Lankan boxer who mainly competed in the bantamweight category.

== Career ==
Perera represented Ceylon at the 1948 Summer Olympics, the year Ceylon got independence from the British Empire. It was also the first Olympics where Ceylon was eligible to participate and Albert competed in the men's bantamweight event. Albert Perera also represented Ceylon at the 1950 British Empire Games and clinched a silver medal in the men's bantamweight category.
