= Puerto Rico Olympic Committee =

Oversees Olympic-sports in Puerto Rico

- Country: Puerto Rico
- Code: PUR
- Created: 1947
- Recognized: January 14, 1948
- Continental Association: PASO
- Headquarters: Casa Olímpica; San Juan, Puerto Rico
- President: Sara Rosario
- Secretary General: Carlos Beltrán Esvelti
- Website: www.copur.pr

Additional logo used

The Puerto Rico Olympic Committee (IOC Code: PUR; Spanish: Comité Olímpico de Puerto Rico, COPUR) is the National Olympic Committee for Puerto Rico. It oversees Olympic-sports in Puerto Rico, and selects the Olympic team which represents the island. It was founded by Julio Enrique Monagas, and was officially recognized in 1948. The COPUR operates the Casa Olímpica, its headquarters in Old San Juan. Teams representing Puerto Rico have participated in every Summer Olympics since 1948. They have also participated at the 1984–2002 and 2018–2026 Winter Olympics.

Five Puerto Ricans have received the International Olympic Committee's (IOC) Olympic Order award. In 2012, Sara Rosario became the first woman to serve as President of the COPUR. Past presidents include the island's first native Governor, Jesús T. Piñero.

== History ==
=== Foundation and early years ===
The COPUR was born from the process that the Ateneo Puertorriqueño held leading to the creation of the January 1933 Federación Deportiva de Puerto Rico. Later growing to become its own entity on April 7, though the format greatly contrasted with the International Olympic Committee (IOC) stance of no government involvement and included the direct involvement of the governor himself. The Puerto Rican Olympiads were created to select the best athletes to assemble a delegation for international competition such as the upcoming 1934 Central American and Caribbean Games. A manifesto on Sports development was drafted on August 2, 1933, requesting a differentiation of amateur and professional sports and adequate funding, stances that were defended before the government. Instead, in 1934 the legislature choose to create a Public Amusement and Sports Commission and abolished the COPR. For the next 14 years, this new structure remained in place. The matter of funding for the construction of facilities remained divisive between local officials and colonial authorities such as governor Gruening.

Journalist Fernando Rodil began an effort to have Puerto Rico included in the 1936 Summer Olympics, which ultimately failed as it was ignored by Governor Blanton Winship and Justo Rivera Cabrera. In 1955, the Pan American Sports Organization elected Monagas to lead the committee of statutes. This gave Puerto Rico the role of coordinating the upcoming Ohio 1959 Games. Formal recognition of the COPUR by the United States, namely the American Olympic Committee and Amateur Athletic Union (AAU), did not take place until Monagas accomplished it in 1957. Following a weak performance at the 1959 Pan American Games, the sport modernization practices and equipment supplied to the athletes became a point of contention. Despite this, a number of Latin American teams requested Monagas' assessment of their athletic facilities.

The United States Lawn Tennis Association blocked Puerto Rico's attempt to be recognized by the International Lawn Tennis Federation. This resulted in Monagas accusing the USLTA of acting in a "colonial spirit", not unlike China did with Taiwan. On September 23, 1959, statehooder Pedro Ramos Casellas protested Puerto Rico's Olympic participation. In turn, athlete Rolando Cruz's protested the absence of the flag of Puerto Rico and La Borinqueña at the 1959 Pan American Games in a letter sent to Brundage. The letter was disregarded and the author redirected towards the COPUR for further complaints.

=== Monagas vs. Guillermety ===
Despite his work, Monagas was ousted from the COPUR after the IOC banned Argentina due to government influence in their committee violating Rule 25. His role within the Popular Democratic Party (PPD) was known by Brundage and Moenck and local sports figure Fred Guillermety intentionally exposed the situation further by asking for a copy of the rule book from Otto Mayer. While Monagas was forced on the defensive against the latter, the former went on the offensive in a newspaper and demanded an independent COPUR. Monagas tried to reorganize the COPUR, but limited the participation of federations and retained his position as president, with Guillermety lambasting the process. Likewise, Mayer was skeptical. Guillermety insisted and went after the application for the Melbourne Olympics, wearing Monagas down into quitting. In open elections, Jaime Annexy was selected as president of the COPUR held on October 4, while the IOC was discussing the case. Puerto Rico was allowed to participate at Melbourne, and the new Committee was provisionally recognized. However, Annexy died shortly after the Olympics and replaced by Monagas' ally Nestor Figarella.

Guillermety once again challenged the election, this time creating a parallel sanctioning body, the Olympic Association of Puerto Rico. The IOC selected Miguel A. Moenck to solve the dilemma, who reinstated Monagas in the presidency. Unsatisfied with the way that the OAPR was treated, he latter accused Mayer of being friends with Guillermety. As the case grabbed the attention of International Amateur Athletic Association president David Burghley, Moenck and Brundage were queried on the situation. The USOC became involved in the process and despite claims that the reorganization had been completed in August 1957, the process extended into the following year. Guillermety once again accused Monagas of tempering, being joined by Manuel Alsina Capó. Federations were then unified to avoid duplication. Despite becoming secretary, Monagas' role in the process was once again impugned by Guillermety. Ignoring other complaints by federation leaders, Mayer opted to trust Moenck and Brundage. On June 6, 1958, a democratic election was held, from which Monagas emerged as the president and Guillermety as treasurer of the newly unified COPUR. Despite being solved, the longstanding controversy costed Puerto Rico the organization of the 1959 Pan American Games.

=== Cold War tensions ===
Puerto Rico was selected to host the games in 1962. In 1959, the idea was proposed before the COPUR Initially, Julio Enrique Monagas was not sure that the available infrastructure could serve to host the event and rejected hosting the 1962 games, but yielded to pressure by other sports figures and the Puerto Rico Secretary of State Roberto Sánchez Vilella. He ultimately consented the proposal to host the next event, which was presented by Héctor R. Monagas. By 1962, part of the COPUR leadership began investigating the type of infrastructure that would be required, a significant amount of film was taken at the facilities used for Tokyo 1964. Monagas would grow to understand the games as an opportunity to exhibit the culture and traditions of Puerto Rico. A Citizens Committee was organized at the request of Sports writers, which backed the idea. The group managed to receive the support of Governor Luis Muñoz Marín, being pivotal in swaying Monagas. Other Olympic Committees backed Puerto Rico's bid. For PPD politicians, the games represented an opportunity to legitimize their Commonwealth project. Muñoz, however, refused to increasethe funding from 7 to 11 millions.

Organizing the games at the height of the Cold War proved challenging and from the get go American policies endangered the participation of Cuba in the event. Local authorities opposed the participation of the nation based on a large exile community, from which right wing terrorist groups operated, that endangered the delegation. After being approached by Sánchez Vilella, Muñoz favored a ban on these grounds and the fact that Fidel Castro had pointed out that the Commonwealth remained a colony in spite of PPD initiatives to the contrary. When Sánchez Vilella became governor, he also opposed granting visas to the Cubans. The possibility that the games could be stripped due to politics was raised in the media. A heart attack also removed Monagas for some months, but he informed the IOC of the situation shortly afterwards.

Knowing that other jurisdictions had been removed as hosts for denying visas, the local government placed the blame on an absence of US-Cuban relations. The IOC decided to take a longer look and Brundage warned that if the Cubans weren't invited, there was a risk of long term consequences for Puerto Rico that included the possibility of hosting the Olympics. Monagas seemed unbothered by this, as that event had not been considered at the moment, and defended that the blame was to lie on politicians. The matter of Cuban participation was followed throughout the region, North America and Europe, while rumors even claimed that Puerto Rico had forfeited its place. Monagas ultimately used his place at the ODECABE to push a resolution legitimizing the ban on security grounds, while other candidates to host the games shied away from the possibility. His motives were questioned by at least one of the participants and opposed by José de J. Clark, but the resolution stood.

Brundage responded by stating that the recognition of the games by the IOC now needed to be justified and would only be granted if all members were allowed to participate. Furthermore, he justified including the Cubans since Jamaica had done so in the previous edition despite facing a similarly volatile political environment. On his part, Clark established communication with Monagas and Germán Rieckehoff Sampayo in an effort to avert the situation. In late 1965, Monagas left all of his local offices and remained as head of Panam Sports (ODEPA). Afterwards, the COPUR and organization committee reverted their position and opted to invite Cuba. However, the government opted to remain neutral, basically guaranteeing that the visas would still be declined by the United States. Clark was angered at the outcome and threatened to offer the hosting responsibilities to another place. In December, the ODECABE requested that Puerto Rico receive a vote of confidence despite the government's stance.

Brundage ultimately negotiated the issue of the visas with C. Allan Stewart. This development led to the IOC certifying the application, only requesting confirmation from the ODECABE from Torregrosa and the committee. However, it was unknown if the local government would accept, and the date of December 17, 1965, was placed as deadline. Ultimately, Rieckhoff Sampayo brokered a deal with the authorities. An additional layer of bureaucracy was added as the visas were sent to Mexico and brought to Cuba afterwards in a process that earned the criticism of Castro. President of the Cuban Olympic Committee Manuel González Guerra was still concerned that the exile, as well as Monagas and the mayor of San Juan could be hostile to its delegation.

The Soviet Olympic Committee became involved through Konstantin Andrianov, who contacted Brundage on behalf of the Cubans. The matter continued at the IOC's 64th session. Locally, the political aspect worsened with the Movimiento Pro Independencia lobbying in favor of the Cuban athletes. Monagas was concerned with this and unsuccessfully tried to invite Brundage to the opening ceremony. For months, the participation of Cuba was a mystery, while final IOC certification for the games was given in April 1966. Meanwhile, a protocol to deal with Cuban defection was enacted by the government of Puerto Rico.

On June 1 the Olympic torch arrived to Puerto Rico, from where a relay took it to San Juan. A week before the start of the games, Adriano contacted the IOC again as an "emergency". The Cuban delegation first expected to travel by air, but were instead sent aboard the Cerro Pelado and monitored by the Americans during their travel. The vessel was ultimately intercepted by the United States Coast Guard and warned not to enter, while the Cubans contacted the Soviets. A day before the inauguration, the Cerro Pelado anchored in international waters, where Juan Mari Brás, Norman Pietri and Ángel Silén met them on behalf of the MPI. Andrianov demanded that the IOC allow the Cuban participation or withdraw recognition of the games.

Rieckehoff was brought in along Eugenio Guerra and the Puerto Rico Secretary of State, boarding the Cerro Pelado to negotiate. Governor Sánchez Vilella had sided with the Cuban exile and only allowed the Cuban athletes to land, but did not grant the vessel permission to dock. While the Puerto Rican's were on board, the Cubans remained contact with the Soviets, who in turn were joined by the Hungarian, Bulgarian and Romanian committees in asking IOC intervention. The following day the athletes agreed to leave the Cerro Pelado and were transported to San Juan aboard independent vessels and taken to customs, from which public busses were offered for transportation to the opening ceremony.

The inauguration was held before a crowd of 19, 262. En mi Viejo San Juan was played along the anthems. The volatile political situation continued, as wrestler Juan Pablo Vega Romero defected. A similar situation involved María Cristina González, who was taken back to the Cerro Pelado. Rumors permeated the games, while the political tension was perceived throughout the media and intervention on behalf of the Cuban exiles was seen from civilians, politicians, Church representatives and government officials. A clash between exiles and the Cuban basketball team was reported and another involved COC treasurer Luis de Cárdenas and Llanusa felt threatened by expatriates. Members of the MPI were also confronted by Cuban exiles.

Meanwhile, the statehood movement was critical of the games. A group led by Carlos Romero Barceló demanded the use of the United States flag and anthem during all ceremonies (which was ignored on the parts concerning to sports and not politics). On the other hand, senator Arturo Ortiz Toro mocked the PPD administration for the political tension involving the Cerro Pelado. The games drew 270, 251 to its events, led by swimming (56,971), athletics (51,586), baseball (29,459), basketball (29,127) and volleyball (25,854). Puerto Rico finished third. Afterwards, the village was repurposed for an urbanization project known as Las Virtudes. A year later, Muñoz Marín praised the work of Monagas during the games. Academic Antonio Sotomayor places these games as the "consolidation of the [Puerto Rican] sport modernization process", noting that afterwards there "was no question of Puerto Rico's nationhood" within athletics.

=== Rieckehoff vs. Romero Barceló ===
Prior to the 1979 Pan American Games, the use of the Puerto Rican flag and anthem over those of the United States became a point of contention between the COPUR and the administration. During his previous term as mayor of San Juan, governor Carlos Romero Barceló had been involved in the organization process, but as soon as he took office demanded that the flag of Puerto Rico could only be used if accompanied by that of the United States and that both anthems were to be played. Pushback came from sports leaders led by Germán Rieckehoff, who noted that it was against IOC rules, while civilian groups backed their stance. The Asociación de Atletas y Deportistas de Puerto Rico emerged as an educational tool against the administration. Romero hosted the opening ceremony and coordinated for both anthems to be played, being jeered himself and witnessing the booing of the American anthem in what became known as "La Pitada Olímpica".

Despite the American boycott of the 1980 Summer Olympics being supported by the Romero Barceló administration, Rieckehoff led the COPUR in defiance and declared that Puerto Rico would exercise its Olympic sovereignty and participate. The government cut funding and widespread discussion of the concept was held, after which delegation of five members (three of them athletes) was sent. Following internal debate within the COPUR, they paraded under the Olympic flag.

== Presidents of the Puerto Rico Olympic Committee ==
- Jesús T. Piñero (1948–1952)
- Julio Enrique Monagas (1952–1956)
- Jaime Annexy Fajardo (1956-1958)
- Julio Enrique Monagas (1958–1965)
- Francisco Bueso (1965–1966)
- Felicio Torregrosa (1966–1973)
- José Enrique Arrarás (1973–1976)
- Osvaldo Gil (1976)
- Germán Rieckehoff (1977–1990)
- Osvaldo Gil (1990–1991)
- Héctor Cardona (1991–2008)
- David Bernier (2008–2012)
- Sara Rosario (since 2012)

== Impact and perception ==
A notable example of cultural (if not political) nationalism, Olympic participation has become one of the most prominent ways in which Puerto Rico interacts with the international community. Academic Félix R. Huertas González argued that it became a "vehicle for national affirmation". Historian Sotomayor states that despite being on a diametrically opposed end of the spectrum, the statehood movement "to this day has not been able to undermine the power of Olympism in Puerto Rican culture."

== See also ==
- Puerto Rico at the Olympics
- List of flag bearers for Puerto Rico at the Olympics
- Puerto Rico at the Pan American Games
- Emilio Huyke - general secretary from 1964 to 1972
