= Giacomo Di Segni =

Italian boxer (1919–1986)

Personal information
- Nationality: Italian
- Born: 30 November 1919; Rome, Italy
- Died: 7 March 1986 (aged 66)

Sport
- Sport: Boxing

Giacomo Di Segni (30 November 1919 – 7 March 1986) was an Italian boxer. He competed at the 1948 Summer Olympics and the 1952 Summer Olympics. In 1951 he won the European Amateur Boxing Championships in Milan.
