= Mac Joachim =

Indian boxer (1925–2013)

Personal information
- Full name: Macketich Hovakimian
- Born: 1925 Calcutta, Bengal Presidency, India
- Died: 11 May 2013 (aged 87–88) Kingston upon Thames, London, England

Sport
- Sport: Boxing

Mackertich "Mac" Joachim (1925 – 11 May 2013) was an Indian boxer who competed in the 1948 Summer Olympics.

Joachim was born in Calcutta in 1925, to an Armenian father who had settled there. He later settled in England where he pursued a professional boxing career. Joachim died in Kingston upon Thames on 11 May 2013.
