= George Hunter (boxer) =

South African boxer, born 1927

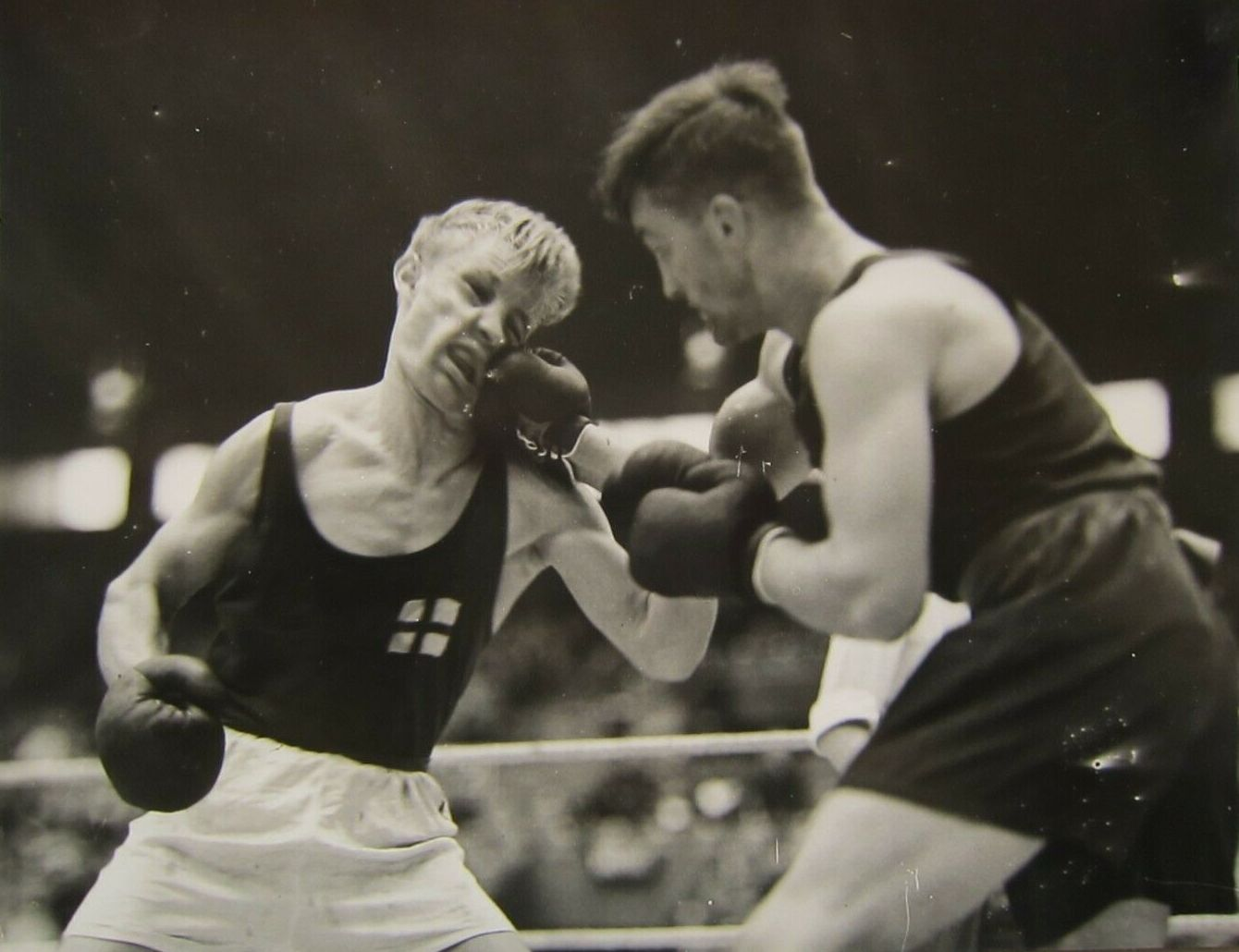
- George Hunter (right) boxing Harry Siljander in the London 1948 Olympics

Personal information
- Born: 22 July 1927
- Died: 12 December 2004 (aged 77)
Medal record
Men's Boxing
Representing South Africa
Olympic Games
Gold medal – first place	1948 London	Light Heavyweight

George Hunter (22 July 1927 – 12 December 2004) was a professional boxer from South Africa, who competed in the Light Heavyweight division during his career as an amateur. He was born in Brakpan. His father was born in Durban and his mother was born in Pretoria. All four of his grandparents were from England.

== Amateur career ==
Hunter represented his native country at the Summer Olympics of 1948, and was awarded the Val Barker Trophy for Outstanding Boxer at the Olympic Games.
