= Giovanni Zuddas =

Italian boxer (1928–1996)

Olympic medal record

Men's Boxing
Silver medal – second place	1948 London	Bantamweight

Giovanni Battista Zuddas (1 March 1928 in Cagliari – 21 October 1996) was a bantamweight professional boxer from Italy, who won the silver medal at the 1948 Summer Olympics, losing to Tibor Csik of Hungary in the championship match.

== 1948 Olympic results ==
Zuddas competed in the bantamweight division at the 1948 London Olympics:

- Round of 32: defeated Bonifacio Zarcal (Philippines) on points
- Round of 16: defeated Jean-Marie Grenot (France) on points
- Quarterfinal: defeated Willie Lenihan (Ireland) referee stopped contest in third round
- Semifinal: defeated Alvaro Vicente (Spain) on points
- Final: lost to Tibor Csik (Hungary) on points (was awarded silver medal)

== Professional career ==
Zuddas turned professional in 1950 and fought primarily in Italy and other European countries. He held the Italian bantamweight title and fought for the title several times throughout his career. In 1959 he lost a decision to Eder Jofre, and retired the following year.
