= Babu Lall =

Indian boxer (c. 1924–1953)

Personal information
- Nationality: Indian
- Born: c. 1924 Calcutta, Bengal Presidency, British India
- Died: 16 May 1953 Calcutta, West Bengal, India

Sport
- Sport: Boxing

Babu Lall (c. 1924 – 16 May 1953) was an Indian boxer. He competed in the men's bantamweight event at the 1948 Summer Olympics.
