= Alejandro Arteche =

Spanish boxer

Alejandro Arteche Zurinaga (Note: In this Spanish name, the first or paternal surname is Arteche and the second or maternal family name is Zurinaga.) (15 February 1923 – 12 November 1998) was a Spanish boxer who competed in the 1948 Summer Olympics.
