= Danny O'Sullivan (boxer) =

Personal information
- Nationality: British
- Born: 6 January 1923 London, England
- Died: 28 February 1990 (aged 67)
- Weight: Bantamweight

Boxing career

Boxing record
- Total fights: 43
- Wins: 33
- Win by KO: 17
- Losses: 9
- Draws: 1

Danny O'Sullivan (6 January 1923 – 28 February 1990) was an English boxer who was the British bantamweight champion between 1949 and 1951, and who also fought for the British Empire, European, and world titles. Danny married Lilian and they had 2 daughters Pat and Carol. Pat married Graham Walsh and had 2 sons, Nick and Steve. Carol married Mike Newby and had a son and a daughter, Simon and Kate.

== Career ==
Born in London, O'Sullivan started boxing in a ring that his sewerman father built in the back garden of their Islington house. His father had supplemented his earnings by boxing in the evenings.

O'Sullivan boxed as an amateur while working as an electrician's mate and later while serving in the Royal Air Force during World War II, winning the ABA bantamweight title in 1947 and fighting in the European championships in Dublin. He turned professional in April 1947 and had his first pro fight three months later, with a first-round stoppage of Wally Basquille at Olympia. After winning his first 12 fights, he won his first title in the thirteenth, beating Jimmy Webster on points in April 1948 to take the South East Area bantamweight title.

He beat Jean Louas and Georges Mousse in his next two fights, before suffering the first defeat of his career in May 1948 when he was beaten on points by Stan Rowan in a British title eliminator. In October 1948 he lost for a second time when he was knocked out in the seventh round by Jackie Paterson at the Royal Albert Hall. In January 1949 he lost to Mickey MacKay after being disqualified for a low blow, but bounced back a week later, forcing European champion Guido Ferracin to retire in the fifth round of their fight. A month later he beat Paterson on points. He looked set to challenge for Manuel Ortiz's world title later that year, but the fight was blocked by the British Boxing Board of Control.

Wins over Ronnie Draper, Fernando Gagnon, Bunty Doran, and Belgian champion Michel Verhamme followed before he got a second shot at the British title, Rowan having vacated. O'Sullivan forced Teddy Gardner to retire at the end of the ninth round with a cut eye at the Royal Albert Hall in December 1949 to become British bantamweight champion.

In April 1950, O'Sullivan challenged for Luis Romero's European title at the Harringay Arena. Weakened after struggling to make the weight, O'Sullivan was floored ten times before finally being stopped by Romero in the thirteenth round. Towards the end of the year he travelled to South Africa, to face Vic Toweel for the British Empire and world titles. O'Sullivan again struggled to make the weight, and Toweel knocked him down 14 times before O'Sullivan retired at the end of the tenth round.

Back in England, O'Sullivan won his next two fights, and in May 1951 made the first defence of his British title against Peter Keenan. Keenan knocked him out in the sixth round to take the title. O'Sullivan had three further fights that year, the last a fifth-round stoppage at the hands of Ronnie Clayton, before retiring from boxing in November 1951.

== Personal life ==
O'Sullivan's younger brother Dickie was also a successful boxer, who fought for the European flyweight title twice in 1948. Danny was the brother of Ronnie O'Sullivan's grandfather Mickey and he died in 1990.
