= Jackie Paterson =

Scottish boxer (1920–1966)

Personal information
- Nationality: British
- Born: 5 September 1920 Springside, Ayrshire, Scotland
- Died: 19 November 1966 (aged 46) Natal, South Africa
- Weight: Flyweight; Bantamweight

Boxing career
- Stance: Southpaw

Boxing record
- Total fights: 91
- Wins: 63
- Win by KO: 41
- Losses: 25
- Draws: 3

Jackie Paterson (5 September 1920 – 19 November 1966) was a Scottish boxer who was an Undisputed World Flyweight Champion. He was also British champion at flyweight and bantamweight.

== Early life ==
Born in Springside, Ayrshire, Paterson emigrated with his family from Scotland, when he was eight years old, to Scranton, Pennsylvania. He returned to Scotland in his early teens to work at John Brown & Co, shipbuilders on the Clyde. He later worked as a butcher. When he was thirteen, he joined the Anderson Club in Glasgow and began to box as an amateur. He turned professional when he was seventeen.

== Boxing style ==
Paterson was a southpaw with a knockout punch in either hand, his most lethal weapon being his left hook. He was comparatively broadly built for a flyweight, and often struggled to make the eight stone flyweight limit. In the latter stages of his career, he fought as a bantamweight.

== Pro career ==
Paterson's first fight was in May 1938 in Greenock, and he beat Joe Kiely on points over ten rounds.

In his nineteenth fight he won the vacant British flyweight title, beating Paddy Ryan by a knockout in the thirteenth round. The fight was in September 1939, in Glasgow.

With the outbreak of World War II, Paterson joined the RAF, but continued to box regularly throughout the war years. By 1943 his rank had risen to Sergeant.

In March 1940, he added the vacant Empire title to his British one, when he won on points against Richie Kid Tanner in Manchester.

In February 1941, he defended both titles against Paddy Ryan in Nottingham, winning on a technical knockout in the eighth. Nine days later he beat Empire bantamweight champion Jim Brady on points in a non-title fight.

In August 1941, he had a shot at the Brady's Empire bantamweight title in Glasgow. However, he lost on points over fifteen rounds.

=== World title ===
In June 1943, Paterson fought former flyweight champion Peter Kane from Golborne in Lancashire for the vacant World flyweight championship. The world title fight, held at Hampden Park in Glasgow, lasted only 61 seconds, as Paterson caught Kane early in the first round putting him down twice, before he was counted out the second time. Paterson was the first southpaw to be world flyweight champion. By successfully defending his British flyweight title twice he had also won a Lonsdale Belt outright. Paterson was subsequently recognised as world champion by the NYSAC.

In September 1943 he suffered his first defeat since May the previous year when he was beaten on points by Len Davies. Paterson was 11.5 pounds overweight at the weigh-in.

In September 1945, Paterson had a rematch with Jim Brady for his Commonwealth bantamweight title, beating him on points in Glasgow, to take the title.

In March 1946, he fought the Frenchman, Theo Medina, for the vacant European bantamweight title. He won the fight, in London on a disqualification in the eighth. Paterson was now World, British and Commonwealth flyweight champion, as well as Commonwealth and European bantamweight champion. Paterson lost a non-title fight to Rinty Monaghan in Belfast in June of that year, retiring after seven rounds. In July he defended his flyweight titles against Joe Curran in Glasgow, winning on points.

In October 1946, Paterson defended his European bantamweight title against Theo Medina, again in Glasgow, but lost the title when Medina knocked him out in the fourth round.

Recognising that his performance levels were dropping, which he blamed on having insufficient time to train while serving in the RAF, in November 1946, Paterson announced his intention to retire after touring either South Africa or Australia, although he changed his mind and would continue for several more years.

In February 1947, he challenged for the British bantamweight title, held by Johnny King. They fought in King's hometown of Manchester, and Paterson knocked King out in the seventh after putting him down four times in the fight.

In October 1947, he defended his British and Commonwealth bantamweight titles against Welshman, Norman Lewis, at Harringay Arena, London. He scored another knockout, stopping Lewis in the fifth.

=== Stripped of titles ===
Paterson was finding it more and more difficult to make the eight stone flyweight limit. In July 1947, he was due to defend his World flyweight title against Dado Marino, but collapsed at the weigh-in after making over-strenuous efforts to lose weight. The result was that the National Boxing Association of America and the British Boxing Board of Control stripped him of his British, Empire, and World titles. Rinty Monaghan of Northern Ireland fought and beat Marino to take the World title, but Paterson took out an injunction against the BBBC to prevent it from recognising Monaghan as champion.

After appealing to the Board, his titles were reinstated in November 1947, and he was ordered to defend against Monaghan.

Eventually, in March 1948, Paterson and Monaghan met in Belfast to decide the matter. Paterson had to lose 4 lbs 12 oz in a week to meet the eight stone limit; as a result, he was dehydrated and weakened. Monaghan knocked him down in the second round and Paterson retired at the end the seventh with a cut over his eye, Monaghan taking the World, British and Empire titles.

=== Remaining career ===
After losing his flyweight titles to Monaghan, Paterson still held the British and Commonwealth bantamweight titles. However his career was going downhill rapidly.

In March 1949, he defended his titles in Liverpool against Stan Rowan, losing on points over fifteen rounds.

In December 1949 he challenged Empire champion Vic Toweel in Johannesburg, losing on points.

His final twelve fights resulted in nine defeats and only three wins. He retired in 1950 but later that year announced his intention to make a comeback. His last fight was in February 1951, in Dundee and was an eight-round points defeat by Willie Miles.

== Retirement and death ==
In his professional career Paterson had earned an estimated £50,000.

After retiring, he moved to Detroit in 1951, before living in South Africa for several years, running hotels. He briefly came back to Britain, but returned to South Africa in December 1965 and began working as a lorry driver in Durban. In 1966, Paterson was stabbed in the throat during a fight after a drinking session, and died at the age of 46.

== Professional boxing record ==
91 fights	63 wins	25 losses
By knockout	40	10
By decision	22	14
By disqualification	1	1
Draws	3	

No.	Result	Record	Opponent	Type	Round(s)	Date	Location	Notes
91	Loss	63–25–3	Willie Myles	PTS	8	Feb 7, 1951	Premierland, Dundee, Scotland, U.K.	
90	Loss	63–24–3	Eddie Carson	KO	2 (8)	May 10, 1950	Kelvin Hall, Glasgow, Scotland, U.K.	
89	Loss	63–23–3	Vic Toweel	PTS	10	Dec 17, 1949	Wembley Stadium, Johannesburg, Gauteng, South Africa	
88	Loss	63–22–3	Maneul Ortiz	PTS	10	Oct 26, 1949	Hampden Park, Glasgow, Scotland, U.K.	
87	Win	63–21–3	Mustapha Mustaphaoui	KO	4 (8)	Aug 26, 1949	Ice Rink, Paisley, Scotland, U.K.	
86	Loss	62–21–3	Stan Rowan	PTS	8	Mar 24, 1949	Anfield Football Ground, Liverpool, Merseyside, England, U.K.	For Commonwealth British Empire and BBBofC British bantamweight title
85	Loss	62–20–3	Danny O'Sullivan	PTS	8	Feb 21, 1949	Royal Albert Hall, Kensington, London, England, U.K.	
84	Loss	62–19–3	Ronnie Draper	PTS	8	Nov 29, 1948	Royal Albert Hall, Kensington, London, England, U.K.	
83	Win	62–18–3	Danny O'Sullivan	KO	7 (8)	Oct 18, 1948	Royal Albert Hall, Kensington, London, England, U.K.	
82	Loss	61–18–3	Teddy Gardner	PTS	8	Aug 23, 1948	Greyhound Stadium, West Hartlepool, County Durham, England, U.K.	
81	Loss	61–17–3	Jean Machterlinck	KO	4 (10)	Jul 27, 1948	Embassy Rink, Birmingham, West Midlands, England, U.K.	
80	Win	61–16–3	Fernando Rosa	TKO	8 (10)	May 5, 1948	Kelvin Hall, Glasgow, Scotland, U.K.	
79	Loss	60–16–3	Rinty Monaghan	KO	7 (15)	Mar 23, 1948	Kings Hall, Belfast, Northern Ireland, U.K.	Lost Lonsdale and The Ring flyweight titles; For NBA flyweight title
78	Win	60–15–3	Alfredo Chavez	PTS	10	Dec 15, 1947	King's Hall, Belle Vue, Manchester, Lancashire, England, U.K.	
77	Win	59–15–3	Stan Rowan	KO	5 (15)	Oct 20, 1947	Harringay Arena, Harringay, London, England, U.K.	Retained BBBofC British bantamweight title
76	Loss	58–15–3	Stan Rowan	TKO	2 (10)	Sep 8, 1947	Harringay Arena, Harringay, London, England, U.K.	
75	Win	58–14–3	Emidio Cacciatori	KO	3 (10)	May 15, 1947	Kelvin Hall, Glasgow, Scotland, U.K.	
74	Win	57–14–3	Corrado Conti	PTS	10	Apr 17, 1947	Kelvin Hall, Glasgow, Scotland, U.K.	
73	Win	56–14–3	Johnny King	KO	7 (15)	Feb 10, 1947	King's Hall, Belle Vue, Manchester, Lancashire, England, U.K.	Won vacant BBBofC British bantamweight title
72	Loss	55–14–3	Cliff Anderson	PTS	8	Jan 20, 1947	Royal Albert Hall, Kensington, London, England, U.K.	
71	Loss	55–13–3	Theo Medina	KO	4 (15)	Oct 30, 1946	Hampden Park, Glasgow, Scotland, U.K.	Lost EBU bantamweight title
70	Win	55–12–3	Joe Curran	PTS	15	Jul 10, 1946	Hampden Park, Glasgow, Scotland, U.K.	Retained NBA, Lonsdale, and The Ring flyweight titles; Retained EBU bantamweight title
69	Loss	54–12–3	Rinty Monaghan	RTD	7 (10)	Jun 7, 1946	Kings Hall, Belfast, Northern Ireland, U.K.	
68	Win	54–11–3	Jimmy Webster	KO	5 (8)	May 22, 1946	Kelvin Hall, Glasgow, Scotland, U.K.	
67	Win	53–11–3	Theo Medina	DQ	8 (15)	Mar 19, 1946	Royal Albert Hall, Kensington, London, England, U.K.	Won vacant EBU bantamweight title
66	Loss	52–11–3	Bunty Doran	PTS	10	Mar 8, 1946	Theatre Royal, Dublin, Ireland	
65	Loss	52–10–3	Theo Medina	PTS	10	Nov 19, 1945	Palais des Sports, Paris, France	
64	Win	52–9–3	Sammy Reynolds	TKO	3 (10)	Nov 6, 1945	Queensberry Club, Soho, London, England, U.K.	
63	Win	51–9–3	Jim Brady	PTS	15	Sep 12, 1945	Hampden Park, Glasgow, Scotland, U.K.	Won vacant Commonwealth British Empire bantamweight title
62	Loss	50–9–3	Gus Foran	PTS	10	Aug 24, 1945	The Dome, Brighton, Sussex, England, U.K.	
61	Win	50–8–3	Jackie Grimes	PTS	8	Jan 29, 1945	Alexandra Theatre, Stoke Newington, London, England, U.K.	
60	Loss	49–8–3	Ben Duffy	KO	7 (10)	Dec 14, 1944	Kelvin Hall, Glasgow, Scotland, U.K.	
59	Loss	49–7–3	Danny Webb	TKO	3 (10)	Oct 25, 1944	Queensberry Club, Soho, London, England, U.K.	
58	Win	49–6–3	Ronnie Clayton	TKO	12 (15)	Aug 12, 1944	Anfield Football Ground, Liverpool, Merseyside, England, U.K.	
57	Win	48–6–3	Ben Duffy	PTS	10	Jul 6, 1944	Hamilton Rink, Hamilton, Scotland, U.K.	
56	Win	47–6–3	Ben Duffy	PTS	10	Apr 24, 1944	Drill Hall, Wolverhampton, West Midlands, England, U.K.	
55	Win	46–6–3	George Pook	TKO	6 (10)	Nov 24, 1943	Queensberry Club, Soho, London, England, U.K.	
54	Loss	45–6–3	Len Davies	PTS	10	Sep 27, 1943	De Montford Hall, Leicester, Leicestershire, England, U.K.	
53	Win	45–5–3	Gus Foran	PTS	10	Aug 11, 1943	Queensberry Club, Soho, London, England, U.K.	
52	Win	44–5–3	George Williams	TKO	2 (10)	Jul 22, 1943	Douglas Park, Hamilton, Scotland, U.K.	
51	Win	43–5–3	Peter Kane	KO	1 (15)	Jun 19, 1943	Hampden Park, Glasgow, Scotland, U.K.	Won Lonsdale and vacant The Ring flyweight titles
50	Win	42–5–3	Al Phillips	TKO	3 (10)	Mar 17, 1943	St Andrews Hall, Glasgow, Scotland, U.K.	
49	Win	41–5–3	Phil Milligan	TKO	2 (10)	Jan 13, 1943	Queensberry Club, Soho, London, England, U.K.	
48	Win	40–5–3	Battling Jim Hayes	KO	1 (10)	Nov 26, 1942	St Andrews Hall, Glasgow, Scotland, U.K.	
47	Win	39–5–3	Norman Lewis	PTS	10	Sep 24, 1942	St Andrews Hall, Glasgow, Scotland, U.K.	
46	Win	38–5–3	Phil Milligan	PTS	10	Aug 7, 1942	King's Hall, Belle Vue, Manchester, Lancashire, England, U.K.	
45	Win	37–5–3	Eddie Petrin	KO	2 (10)	Jul 20, 1942	Queensberry Club, Soho, London, Scotland, U.K.	
44	Win	36–5–3	Frankie Kid Bonsor	TKO	2 (10)	Jul 6, 1942	Greyfriars Hall, Nottingham, Nottinghamshire, England, U.K.	
43	Win	35–5–3	Billy Tansey	KO	2 (10)	Jun 18, 1942	St Andrews Hall, Glasgow, Scotland, U.K.	
42	Loss	34–5–3	Frankie Kid Bonsor	TKO	6 (10)	May 18, 1942	Greyfriars Hall, Nottingham, Nottinghamshire, England, U.K.	Paterson quit with broken hand
41	Win	34–4–3	Joe Hardy	TKO	4 (10)	Mar 12, 1942	St Andrews Hall, Glasgow, Scotland, U.K.	Hardy retired with an injured wrist
40	Win	33–4–3	Joe Hardy	TKO	6 (10)	Feb 23, 1942	Royal Albert Hall, Kensington, London, England, U.K.	
39	Win	32–4–3	Dudley Lewis	KO	1 (10)	Dec 8, 1941	Royal Albert Hall, Kensington, London, England, U.K.	
38	Win	31–4–3	Billy Hazelgrove	KO	9 (10)	Nov 14, 1941	King's Hall, Belle Vue, Manchester, Lancashire, England, U.K.	
37	Win	30–4–3	Richie Tanner	PTS	10	Sep 19, 1941	King's Hall, Belle Vue, Manchester, Lancashire, England, U.K.	
36	Loss	29–4–3	Jim Brady	PTS	15	Aug 5, 1941	Hampden Park, Glasgow, Scotland, U.K.	For Commonwealth British Empire bantamweight title
35	Win	29–3–3	Jimmy Lydon	TKO	9 (10)	Jun 20, 1941	King's Hall, Belle Vue, Manchester, Lancashire, England, U.K.	
34	Win	28–3–3	Jimmy Stubbs	PTS	10	Jun 1, 1941	The Stadium, Liverpool, Merseyside, England, U.K.	
33	Win	27–3–3	Richie Tanner	TKO	2 (10)	May 27, 1941	Shawfield Park, Glasgow, Scotland, U.K.	
32	Win	26–3–3	Billy Hazelgrove	PTS	10	May 19, 1941	Colston Hall, Bristol, Avon, England, U.K.	
31	Win	25–3–3	Phil Milligan	PTS	10	Mar 24, 1941	King's Hall, Belle Vue, Manchester, Lancashire, England, U.K.	
30	Win	24–3–3	Jim Brady	PTS	10	Feb 12, 1941	New St James Hall, Newcastle, Tyne and Wear, England, U.K.	
29	Win	23–3–3	Paddy Ryan	TKO	8 (15)	Feb 3, 1941	Ice Rink, Nottingham, Nottinghamshire, England, U.K.	Retained Commonwealth British Empire and BBBofC British flyweight titles
28	Win	22–3–3	Billy Clinton	KO	2 (10)	Jan 1, 1941	Tannadice Park, Dundee, Scotland, U.K.	
27	Win	21–3–3	Jimmy Stewart	KO	3 (10)	Dec 28, 1940	Grove Stadium, Glasgow, Scotland, U.K.	
26	Win	20–3–3	Teddy O'Neill	PTS	10	Dec 25, 1940	Parkhead Arena, Glasgow, Scotland, U.K.	
25	Win	19–3–3	Jimmy Stewart	KO	6 (10)	Nov 13, 1940	New St James Hall, Newcastle, Tyne and Wear, England, U.K.	
24	Win	18–3–3	Richie Tanner	PTS	10	Jul 25, 1940	The Stadium, Liverpool, Merseyside, England, U.K.	
23	Win	17–3–3	Young Chocolate	TKO	2 (10)	Jun 26, 1940	Hibernian F.C. Ground, Edinburgh, Scotland, U.K.	
22	Win	16–3–3	Wally Knightley	TKO	8 (10)	Jun 1, 1940	Saltergate (Chesterfield FC), Chesterfield, Derbyshire, England, U.K.	
21	Win	15–3–3	Richie Tanner	PTS	15	Mar 11, 1940	King's Hall, Belle Vue, Manchester, Lancashire, England, U.K.	Won vacant Commonwealth British Empire flyweight title
20	Loss	14–3–3	Charley Brown	PTS	10	Nov 27, 1939	Earls Court Empress Hall, Kensington, London, England, U.K.	
19	Win	14–2–3	Paddy Ryan	KO	13 (15)	Sep 30, 1939	Cartyne Greyhound Track, Glasgow, Scotland, U.K.	Won vacant BBBofC British flyweight title
18	Win	13–2–3	Eric Jones	KO	1 (15)	Aug 15, 1939	Cartyne Greyhound Track, Glasgow, Scotland, U.K.	
17	Win	12–2–3	Joe Curran	PTS	10	Jul 19, 1939	Caird Hall, Dundee, Scotland, U.K.	
16	Win	11–2–3	Tut Whalley	KO	1 (10)	Jun 15, 1939	Saracen Park, Glasgow, Scotland, U.K.	
15	Win	10–2–3	Freddie Tennant	TKO	11 (15)	May 31, 1939	Caird Hall, Dundee, Scotland, U.K.	Won BBBofC Scottish Area flyweight
14	Draw	9–2–3	Valentin Angelmann	PTS	10	May 16, 1939	Saracen Park, Glasgow, Scotland, U.K.	
13	Win	9–2–2	Raoul Degryse	PTS	10	May 3, 1939	Saracen Park, Glasgow, Scotland, U.K.	
12	Win	8–2–2	Gavino Matta	TKO	7 (10)	Mar 10, 1939	Eldorado Stadium, Edinburgh-Leith, Scotland, U.K.	
11	Win	7–2–2	Jack Kiley	KO	1 (10)	Feb 24, 1939	Town Hall, Port Glasgow, Scotland, U.K.	
10	Draw	6–2–2	Tut Whalley	PTS	10	Jan 16, 1939	New St James Hall, Newcastle, Tyne and Wear, England, U.K.	
9	Win	6–2–1	Phil Milligan	TKO	6 (10)	Dec 19, 1938	New St James Hall, Newcastle, Tyne and Wear, England, U.K.	
8	Win	5–2–1	Billy Nash	RTD	8 (10)	Dec 14, 1938	City Hall, Glasgow, Scotland, U.K.	
7	Win	4–2–1	Mickey O'Neill	PTS	10	Sep 27, 1938	Shawfield Park, Glasgow, Scotland, U.K.	
6	Loss	3–2–1	Joe Curran	TKO	4 (10)	Aug 26, 1938	Saracen Park, Glasgow, Scotland, U.K.	
5	Draw	3–1–1	Tommy Stewart	PTS	10	Aug 19, 1938	Cuba Street Sports Stadium, Belfast, Northern Ireland, U.K.	
4	Loss	3–1	Joe Curran	DQ	4 (8)	Aug 17, 1938	Shawfield Park, Glasgow, Scotland, U.K.	
3	Win	3–0	Pat McStravick	TKO	8 (10)	Aug 2, 1938	Parkhead Arena, Glasgow, Scotland, U.K.	
2	Win	2–0	Rinty Monaghan	KO	5 (8)	Jul 23, 1938	The Oval (Glentoran FC), Belfast, Northern Ireland, U.K.	
1	Win	1–0	Joe Kiely	PTS	10	May 27, 1938	Argyle Theater, Greenock, Scotland, U.K.	

== Titles in boxing ==
=== Major world titles ===
- NBA (WBA) flyweight champion (112 lbs)

=== The Ring magazine titles ===
- The Ring flyweight champion (112 lbs)

=== Regional/International titles ===
- Lonsdale Belt flyweight champion (112 lbs)
- Scottish Area flyweight champion (112 lbs)
- British flyweight champion (112 lbs)
- Commonwealth flyweight champion (112 lbs)
- Commonwealth bantamweight champion (118 lbs)
- European bantamweight champion (118 lbs)
- British bantamweight champion (118 lbs) (2×)

=== Undisputed titles ===
- Undisputed flyweight champion (Note: The NYSAC stopped awarding their flyweight title during this period, as such, Jackie was recognized as the undisputed flyweight world champion.)

== See also ==
- List of flyweight boxing champions
- List of British bantamweight boxing champions
- List of left-handed boxers
- List of British flyweight boxing champions

== Notes and references ==
=== References ===
Achievements
Preceded by Peter Kane	World Flyweight Champion; 19 June 1943 – 23 March 1948	Succeeded by Rinty Monaghan
