= Teddy Gardner =

English boxer (1922–1977)

Personal information
- Nationality: English
- Born: 27 January 1922 West Hartlepool, England
- Died: 1977 (aged 54-55)
- Weight: Flyweight, bantamweight

Boxing career

Boxing record
- Total fights: 66
- Wins: 55 (KO 12)
- Losses: 8 (KO 4)
- Draws: 3

Teddy Gardner (27 January 1922 – 1977) was an English professional flyweight/bantamweight boxer of the 1930s, 1940s and 1950s, who won the British Boxing Board of Control (BBBofC) British flyweight title, European Boxing Union (EBU) flyweight title, and British Empire flyweight title, and was a challenger for the BBBofC British bantamweight title.

== Career ==
Born in West Hartlepool, and a publican by trade, Gardner made his professional debut in May 1938 with a fourth round knockout of Jack Herberts. In 45 fights between 1938 and September 1949 he won 38 (including victories over Pat Palmer, Jackie Paterson, and Bunty Doran), losing 5 and drawing 2 (one of these to Doran).

In December 1939 he faced Danny O'Sullivan at the Royal Albert Hall for the British bantamweight title that had been vacated by Stan Rowan. O'Sullivan stopped him in the ninth round. In his next fight, he retired in the fourth round in an Empire title eliminator against Fernando Gagnon.

Gardner was unbeaten in his next 14 fights, including a points win over Honore Pratesi, the last of these a win over Vic Herman in a final eliminator for the British flyweight title.

In February 1952 he knocked out French champion Louis Skena in the sixth round at the New St James Hall, Newcastle-upon-Tyne, to take the vacant European flyweight title. A month later, he successfully defended the European title, beating Terry Allen on points, also taking the British and British Empire flyweight titles. He made a second successful defence of the European title in June, beating Otello Belardinelli on points at the West Hartlepool Greyhound Stadium.

In September 1952 he was stopped in the twelfth round by South African Jake Tuli in a defence of his Empire title, in what proved to be his final fight.

He continued as a publican, and in 1954 was the landlord of the Half Moon in Spennymoor.

Gardner married Ruth Simpson on 26 March 1951.
