= Vic Toweel =

South African boxer

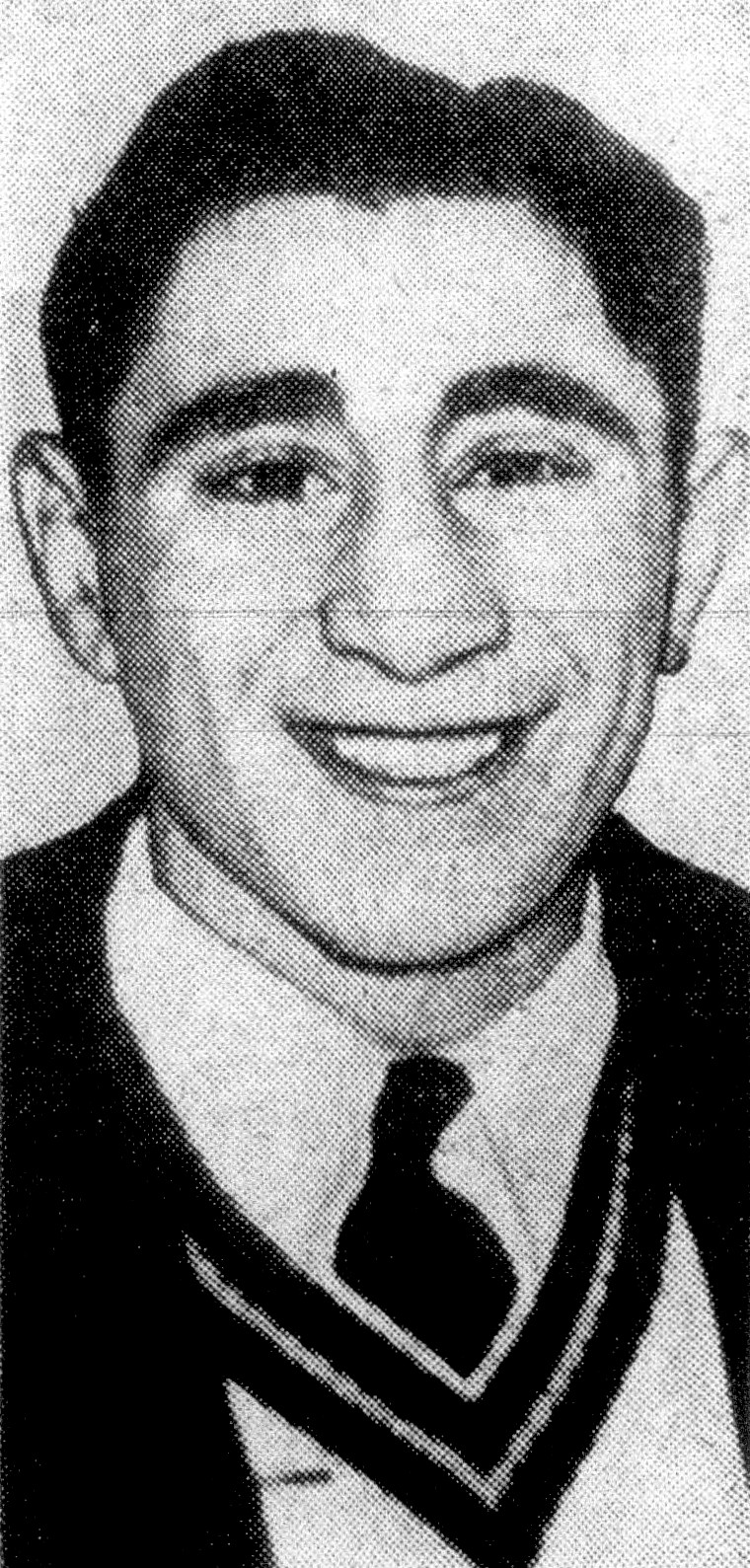
- Toweel, circa 1950

Personal information
- Nationality: South African
- Born: Victor Anthony Toweel; 12 January 1928 Benoni, Gauteng, South Africa
- Died: 15 August 2008 (aged 80)
- Height: 5 ft 5 in (1.65 m)
- Weight: Bantamweight

Boxing career
- Reach: 69 in (168 cm)
- Stance: Orthodox

Boxing record
- Total fights: 32
- Wins: 28
- Win by KO: 14
- Losses: 3
- Draws: 1

Victor "Vic" Anthony Toweel (12 January 1928 – 15 August 2008) was a South African boxer and former Undisputed World Bantamweight Champion. He was the first South African to hold a world title.

== Personal ==
Victor Anthony Toweel was born on 12 January 1928 in Benoni, South Africa. He was the second eldest of five brothers and the son of Michael Joseph Toweel, who was of Lebanese descent.

Toweel's father, better known as Pappa Mike, taught his sons, Jimmy, Victor, Fraser, Willie and Allan the basic rudiments of boxing and forged a family legacy in a makeshift corrugated iron gymnasium in the backyard of his home in Benoni. All of the Toweel brothers achieved success in the boxing world: Willie won an Olympic bronze medal and fought for a world title, Allan was a trainer, Maurice a matchmaker and Jimmy a South African champion.

== Amateur career ==
Toweel was a successful amateur, winning Springbok colours, and compiling a record of 188 wins with only two losses - 160 by knock out. He won East Rand, Transvaal and SA junior and senior titles from 1941 to 1948 and was No 1 choice for the 1948 Olympic team. He competed in the 1948 Summer Olympics in London in the bantamweight competition, but was eliminated in the first round by Arnoldo Parés of Argentina in a controversial decision.

== Pro career ==
Soon after returning from the Olympics, Toweel turned professional. He made his professional debut on 29 January 1949, stopping Johannes Landman in the second round, the same night his brother Jimmy won the national lightweight title. Two wins inside the distance over Herby Andre and Kalla Persson followed.

In his fourth professional fight Toweel won the SA bantamweight title when veteran Jimmy Webster was disqualified in the third round for holding.

In his ninth fight, he became the SA featherweight champion. He captured the British Empire Bantamweight Title, in his 11th fight.

On 31 May 1950, in his 14th fight, at the age of 21, he won the world bantamweight championship.

Fighting using nicknames including "Dynamite," "Benoni's Mighty Mouse," the "Benoni Buzzaw," and the "white Henry Armstrong" for his constant attack fighting style, Toweel beat Word bantamweight champion Manuel Ortiz, who was recognised as one of the greatest bantamweight champions of all time. At that stage, Manuel Ortiz was a veteran of 110 fights whereas Vic had had only fought 13 contests as a professional.

During his reign as a world champion, Toweel had 13 bouts consisting of three successful title defences and 10 successful non-title fights against world rated contenders.

He successfully defended his world title against Danny O'Sullivan (KO 10 round) whom he dropped 14 times, winning him a place in the Guinness Book of Records, for the most knock downs in a world title fight. His second and third title defences were against Luis Romero (won in 15 rounds) and Peter Keenan (won in 15 rounds). A drastically weight-weakened Vic was dethroned by Australian Jimmy Carruthers in his fourth title defence, Toweel losing by a first round knockout.

Carruthers gave Toweel a return match on 21 March 1953 and a crowd of 35,000 saw him holding his own until the sixth round, when he began to fade. He was counted out in the tenth.

On his return following eye surgery, he announced that he would continue fighting as a featherweight. On 11 December 1953 he outpointed British featherweight champion Ronnie Clayton before losing on points to highly regarded Carmelo Costa in New York.

On 6 November 1953 Vic had his last fight, in the welterweight division, when he stopped Harry Walker in the eighth.

After years of battling with his weight and only two months short of his 27th birthday, he decided to hang up his gloves with a professional record was 28-3-1 (14).

Toweel was SA's first and so-far only undisputed world boxing champion.

== Life after boxing ==
Toweel retired to Australia in the 1980s and died aged 80 in Sydney, Australia, on August 15, 2008.

== Professional boxing record ==
| 32 fights | 28 wins | 3 losses |
|---|---|---|
| By knockout | 14 | 2 |
| By decision | 13 | 1 |
| By disqualification | 1 | 0 |
| Draws | 1 | |

| No. | Result | Record | Opponent | Type | Round | Date | Location | Notes |
|---|---|---|---|---|---|---|---|---|
| 32 | Win | 28–3–1 | (Union of South Africa) Harry Walker | RTD | 6 (10) | Nov 6, 1954 | (Union of South Africa) Rand Stadium, Johannesburg, Gauteng, South Africa | |
| 31 | Loss | 27–3–1 | (United States) Carmelo Costa | UD | 10 | Jul 26, 1954 | (United States) Eastern Parkway Arena, Brooklyn, New York City, New York, U.S. | |
| 30 | Win | 27–2–1 | (United Kingdom) Ronnie Clayton | PTS | 10 | Dec 12, 1953 | (Union of South Africa) Wembley Stadium, Johannesburg, Gauteng, South Africa | |
| 29 | Loss | 26–2–1 | (Australia) Jimmy Carruthers | KO | 10 (15) | Mar 21, 1953 | (Union of South Africa) Rand Stadium, Johannesburg, Gauteng, South Africa | For NBA, NYSAC, Commonwealth British Empire, and The Ring bantamweight titles |
| 28 | Loss | 26–1–1 | (Australia) Jimmy Carruthers | KO | 1 (15) | Nov 15, 1952 | (Union of South Africa) Rand Stadium, Johannesburg, Gauteng, South Africa | Lost NBA, NYSAC, Commonwealth British Empire, and The Ring bantamweight titles |
| 27 | Win | 26–0–1 | (France) Georges Mousse | PTS | 10 | Aug 16, 1952 | (Union of South Africa) Wembley Stadium, Johannesburg, Gauteng, South Africa | |
| 26 | Draw | 25–0–1 | (France) Georges Mousse | PTS | 10 | Jul 19, 1952 | (Southern Rhodesia) Raylton Sports Ground, Harare (Salisbury), Zimbabwe | |
| 25 | Win | 25–0 | (France) Theo Medina | TKO | 7 (10) | May 31, 1952 | (Union of South Africa) Olympia Ice Rink, Johannesburg, Gauteng, South Africa | |
| 24 | Win | 24–0 | (Union of South Africa) Tony Lombard | RTD | 8 (12) | Mar 24, 1952 | (Union of South Africa) Van Riebeeck Stadium, Cape Town, Western Cape, South Africa | Retained South African featherweight title |
| 23 | Win | 23–0 | (United Kingdom) Peter Keenan | PTS | 15 | Jan 26, 1952 | (Union of South Africa) Rand Stadium, Johannesburg, Gauteng, South Africa | Retained NBA, NYSAC, Commonwealth British Empire, and The Ring bantamweight titles |
| 22 | Win | 22–0 | (Spain) Luis Romero | PTS | 15 | Nov 17, 1951 | (Union of South Africa) Rand Stadium, Johannesburg, Gauteng, South Africa | Retained NBA, NYSAC, and The Ring bantamweight titles |
| 21 | Win | 21–0 | (France) Georges Mousse | PTS | 10 | Nov 2, 1951 | (Union of South Africa) Davies Stadium, Port Elizabeth, Eastern Cape, South Africa | |
| 20 | Win | 20–0 | (United Kingdom) Bobby Boland | KO | 1 (10) | Sep 1, 1951 | (Union of South Africa) Wembley Stadium, Johannesburg, Gauteng, South Africa | |
| 19 | Win | 19–0 | (United Kingdom) Jim Kenny | RTD | 7 (10) | Jun 30, 1951 | (Union of South Africa) Olympia Ice Rink, Johannesburg, Gauteng, South Africa | |
| 18 | Win | 18–0 | (Union of South Africa) Fanie van Graan | KO | 2 (12) | Jun 16, 1951 | (Union of South Africa) Olympia Ice Rink, Johannesburg, Gauteng, South Africa | Retained South African featherweight title |
| 17 | Win | 17–0 | (United Kingdom) Danny O'Sullivan | TKO | 10 (15) | Dec 2, 1950 | (Union of South Africa) Wembley Stadium, Johannesburg, Gauteng, South Africa | Retained NBA, NYSAC, Commonwealth British Empire, and The Ring bantamweight titles |
| 16 | Win | 16–0 | (United Kingdom) Bunty Doran | TKO | 9 (10) | Nov 3, 1950 | (Union of South Africa) Beach Tennis Courts, Durban, KwaZulu-Natal, South Africa | |
| 15 | Win | 15–0 | (Italy) Alvaro Nuvoloni | PTS | 10 | Oct 21, 1950 | (Union of South Africa) Wembley Stadium, Johannesburg, Gauteng, South Africa | |
| 14 | Win | 14–0 | (United States) Manuel Ortiz | PTS | 15 | May 31, 1950 | (Union of South Africa) Wembley Stadium, Johannesburg, Gauteng, South Africa | Won NBA, NYSAC, and The Ring bantamweight title |
| 13 | Win | 13–0 | (Canada) Fernando Gagnon | PTS | 15 | Apr 8, 1950 | (Union of South Africa) Wembley Stadium, Johannesburg, Gauteng, South Africa | Retained Commonwealth British Empire bantamweight title |
| 12 | Win | 12–0 | (United Kingdom) Jackie Paterson | PTS | 10 | Dec 17, 1949 | (Union of South Africa) Wembley Stadium, Johannesburg, Gauteng, South Africa | |
| 11 | Win | 11–0 | (United Kingdom) Stan Rowan | PTS | 15 | Nov 12, 1949 | (Union of South Africa) Wembley Stadium, Johannesburg, Gauteng, South Africa | Won Commonwealth British Empire bantamweight title |
| 10 | Win | 10–0 | (Union of South Africa) Tony Lombard | PTS | 12 | Sep 30, 1949 | (Union of South Africa) Wembley Stadium, Johannesburg, Gauteng, South Africa | Retained South African featherweight title |
| 9 | Win | 9–0 | (Union of South Africa) Tony Lombard | PTS | 12 | Aug 6, 1949 | (Union of South Africa) Wembley Stadium, Johannesburg, Gauteng, South Africa | Won vacant South African featherweight title |
| 8 | Win | 8–0 | (Union of South Africa) Plasie Fourie | KO | 1 (6) | Jun 30, 1949 | (Union of South Africa) Town Hall, Germiston, Gauteng, South Africa | |
| 7 | Win | 7–0 | (Union of South Africa) Jackie Johnson | TKO | 4 (10) | Jun 27, 1949 | (Union of South Africa) Palladium Theatre, Springs, Gauteng, South Africa | |
| 6 | Win | 6–0 | (Union of South Africa) Johnny Holt | PTS | 6 | Jun 8, 1949 | (Union of South Africa) Beach Tennis Courts, Durban, KwaZulu-Natal, South Africa | |
| 5 | Win | 5–0 | (Union of South Africa) Jackie Johnson | TKO | 1 (6) | May 12, 1949 | (Union of South Africa) Plaza Theatre, Johannesburg, Gauteng, South Africa | |
| 4 | Win | 4–0 | (Union of South Africa) Jimmy Webster | DQ | 3 (12) | Mar 26, 1949 | (Union of South Africa) Wembley Stadium, Johannesburg, Gauteng, South Africa | Won South African bantamweight title |
| 3 | Win | 3–0 | (Union of South Africa) Kalla Persson | KO | 1 (6) | Mar 10, 1949 | (Union of South Africa) Town Hall, Germiston, Gauteng, South Africa | |
| 2 | Win | 2–0 | (Union of South Africa) Herbie Andre | TKO | 2 (6) | Feb 26, 1949 | (Union of South Africa) City Hall, Johannesburg, Gauteng, South Africa | |
| 1 | Win | 1–0 | (Union of South Africa) Johannes Landman | KO | 2 (4) | Jan 29, 1949 | (Union of South Africa) Wembley Stadium, Johannesburg, Gauteng, South Africa | |

== Titles in boxing ==
=== Major world titles ===
- NYSAC bantamweight champion (118 lbs)
- NBA (WBA) bantamweight champion (118 lbs)

=== The Ring magazine titles ===
- The Ring bantamweight champion (118 lbs)

=== Regional/International titles ===
- Commonwealth bantamweight champion (118 lbs)
- South African bantamweight champion (118 lbs)
- South African featherweight champion (126 lbs)

=== Undisputed titles ===
- Undisputed bantamweight champion

== See also ==
- List of bantamweight boxing champions

Achievements
| Preceded by Manuel Ortiz | World Bantamweight Champion; 31 May 1950 – 15 November 1952 | Succeeded by Jimmy Carruthers |
