= Jake Tuli =

South African boxer

Personal information
- Nickname: Young Jake
- Nationality: South African
- Born: Jacob Ntuli; 7 July 1931 Johannesburg, South Africa
- Died: 24 November 1998 (aged 67) Soweto, South Africa
- Weight: fly/bantam/featherweight

Boxing career

Boxing record
- Total fights: 47
- Wins: 31 (KO 16)
- Losses: 14 (KO 3)
- Draws: 2

Jake Tuli (7 July 1931 – 24 November 1998) born Jacob Ntuli in Johannesburg was a South African professional fly/bantam/featherweight boxer of the 1950s and 1960s who won the Transvaal (South Africa) (Non White) flyweight title, South African (Non White) bantamweight title, South African (Non White) flyweight title, and British Empire flyweight title, and was a challenger for the British Empire bantamweight title against Peter Keenan, his professional fighting weight varied from 110 1/2 lb (50.1 kg; 7 st 12.5 lb), i.e. flyweight to 123 1/2 lb (56.0 kg; 8 st 11.5 lb), i.e. featherweight.

== Profile ==
Jacob Ntuli turned professional boxer in 1950 aged 19, in his eighth bout he captured the South African bantamweight title and later the flyweight title, in 1952 he became the first black South African to win an Empire championship (the forerunner to the Commonwealth title), this success made him one of the best two or three flyweights at that time, and his achievement was confirmed when The Ring magazine ranked him as their top-rated flyweight, he had 19-fights in South Africa, 25-fights in Great Britain, 1-fight in Portuguese Mozambique, 1-fight in the Philippines, and 1-fight in Rhodesia. Ntuli was the first black South African boxer to receive world acclaim, his achievements are particularly remarkable in that they came at a time when black boxers were severely restricted and had little hope of advancement in the sport, as black fighters at the time were not allowed to compete against white fighters, and were restricted to black promoters, yet ironically, he became a favourite of the white boxing establishment. Ntuli was one of South Africa's finest fighters who made his mark on the sport of boxing, he proved his ability against the very best of his era and in doing this, played a pioneering role that opened doors for other black sportspersons, and is widely regarded as one of the 10 greatest South African boxers of all time, and it was for these reasons that he was posthumously awarded the Order of Ikhamanga in Silver.
