= Lonsdale Belt =

British boxing award

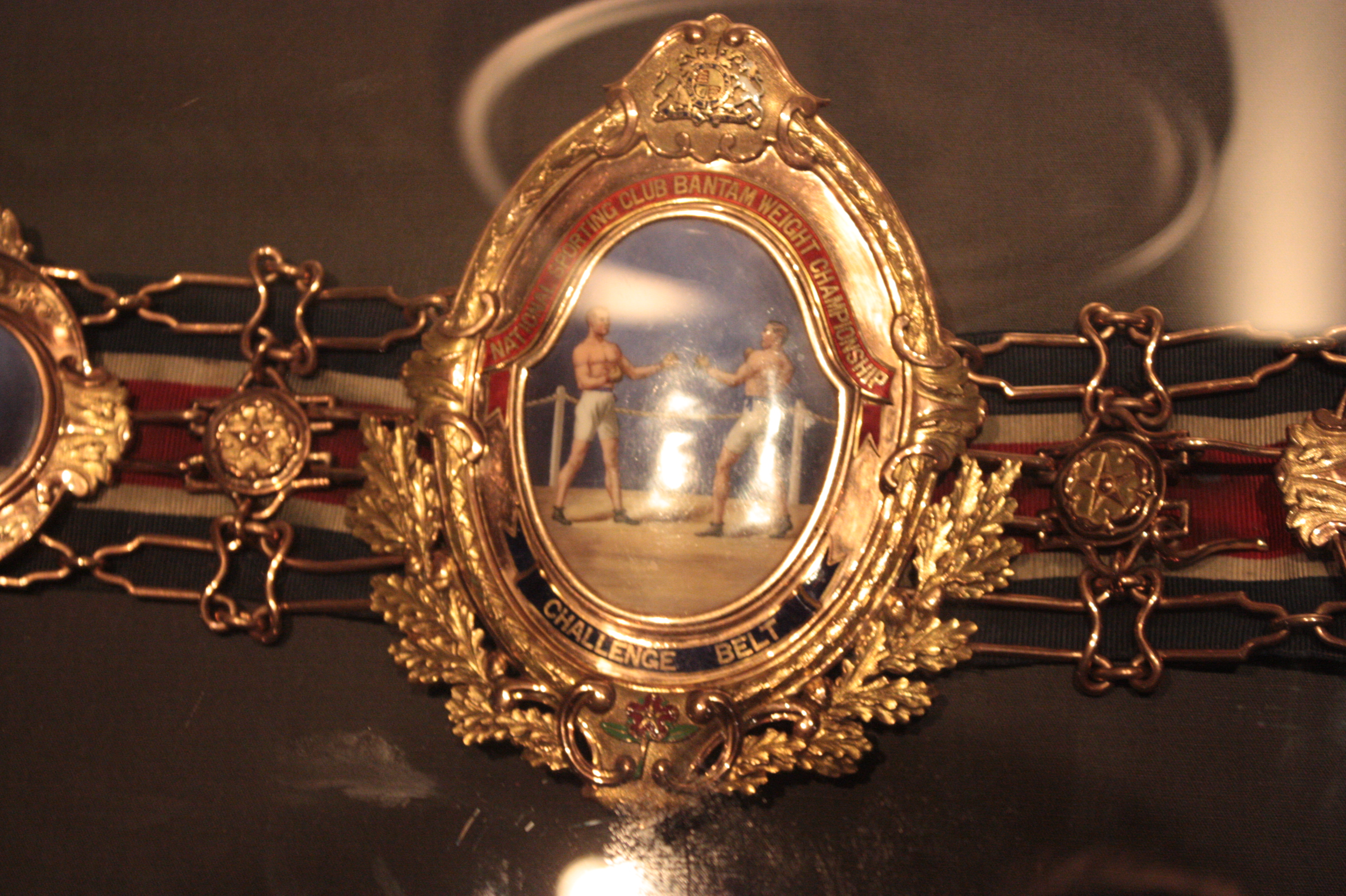
- Awarded for: British professional boxing championships
- Country: United Kingdom
- Presented by: National Sporting Club (originally); British Boxing Board of Control
- First award: 8 November 1909
- Website: bbbofc.com/lord-lonsdale-challenge-belt

The Lord Lonsdale Challenge Belt, commonly known as the Lonsdale Belt, is the oldest championship belt in British professional boxing. Lord Lonsdale introduced the prize in 1909 on behalf of the National Sporting Club (NSC). Freddie Welsh received the first belt after winning the club's British lightweight title. Under NSC rules, a champion could keep the belt after winning three title bouts or holding the title for three years without a challenge. A colour bar kept boxers such as Len Johnson from competing for the belt.

In 1936, the British Boxing Board of Control (BBBofC) took over issuing Lonsdale Belts. Heavyweight Henry Cooper won three belts outright. In 1999, the Board raised the usual requirement for outright ownership to four British title wins in the same weight division, including at least one mandatory defence. Some belts have entered museum collections or been sold at auction, and several have been stolen. In 2013, the Board introduced the Lonsdale Badge, which outright winners can wear on their boxing shorts. In May 2023, Lauren Price became the first woman to receive a Lonsdale Belt after winning the inaugural British women's welterweight title.

== History ==
=== 1909–1929: National Sporting Club ===
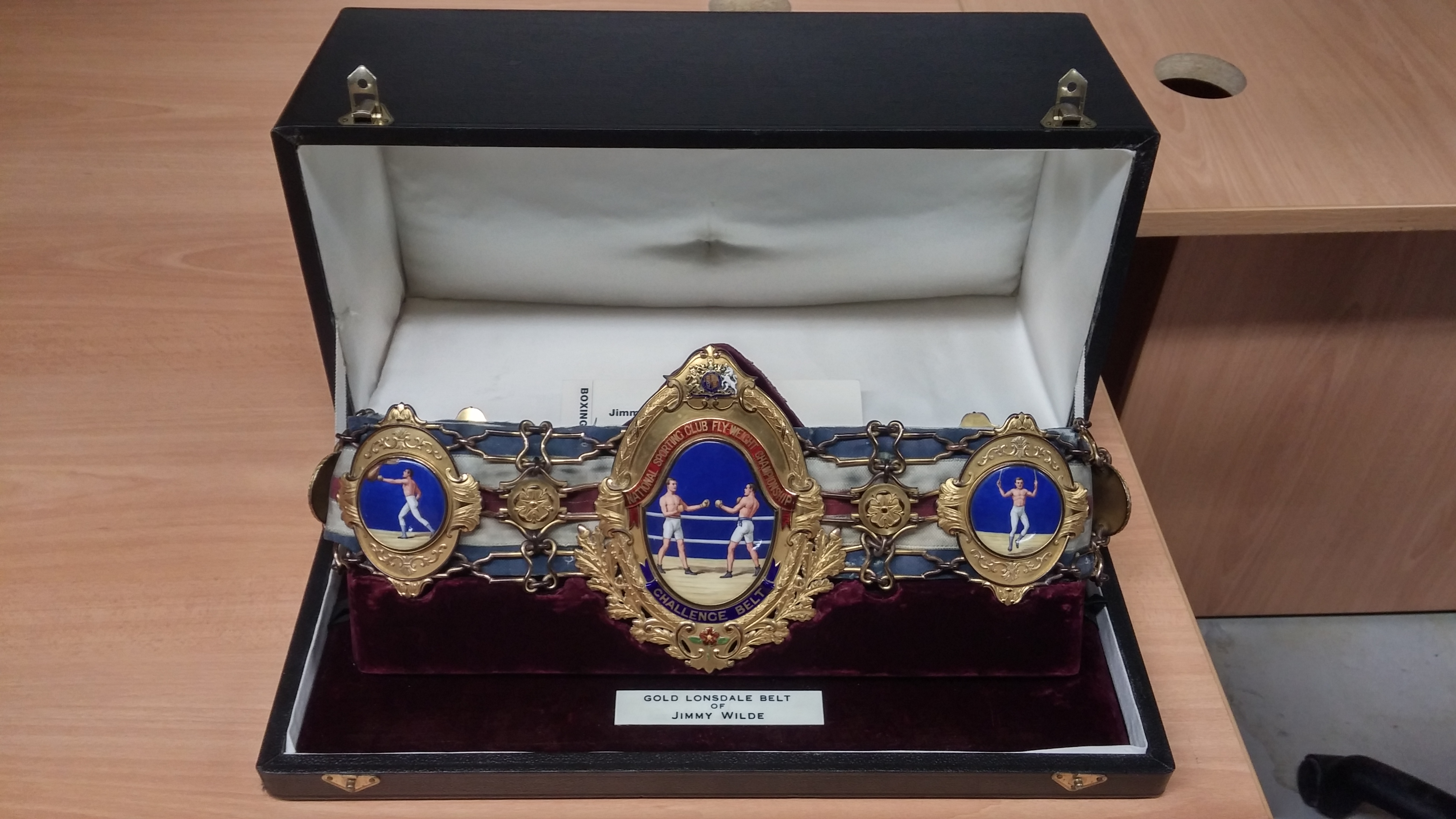
Jimmy Wilde's Lonsdale Belt

Lord Lonsdale was the first president of the National Sporting Club (NSC). In 1909, he introduced the Lonsdale Belt, originally the Challenge Belt, as a new trophy for British boxing champions in each weight division. Arthur Frederick Bettinson wrote that the club had considered offering belts for world championships, but could not meet the financial demands of leading boxers.

According to boxing historian John Harding, the belt also served as a mechanism of governance. By stipulating that only contests held under NSC auspices could produce a legitimate British champion, and that such a champion would hold the Lonsdale Belt, the club positioned itself as the de facto national authority over professional boxing, comparable to The Football Association in football.

Early belts were produced in nine-carat gold, occasionally 22-carat, and composed of two heavy chains with a central enamel medallion depicting a boxing match; the centrepiece is flanked by enamel medallions showing single boxers and gold medallions with a scroll on which are inscribed the names of belt winners. The medallions are interspersed with smaller gold medallions depicting the Union Rose. The belts are backed with a red, white and blue ribbon. The first belts were made by the London jewellers Mappin & Webb at their Birmingham workshops, under a contract begun by the NSC in 1909. A total of 22 Lonsdale Belts were issued by the NSC; 20 were won outright. Writing in 1922, Bettinson and Bennison reported that the heavyweight belt had been contested only four times. They attributed the small number to a shortage of suitable contenders and the boxers' financial demands.

The manager of the NSC, Bettinson, published details about the terms and conditions of holding the belt agreed by the club in Sporting Life on 22 December 1909.

The holder was required to defend his title within six months of a challenge. The minimum stake was £100 a side (£200 for heavyweights, £50 for flyweights).

The belt became the holder's property if he was declared the winner of three championship contests, consecutive or otherwise, held under the auspices of the NSC. Where no challenge was made, a holder could instead become outright owner by remaining undisputed champion for three consecutive years. Outright winners would also receive an NSC pension of £52 a year (one pound a week) from the age of 50.

Before each defence the holder had to deposit the belt with the club's manager, and to insure it against loss or damage by larceny and fire for £200, that sum being lodged with the NSC as security.

The first recipient of this belt was Freddie Welsh, who defeated Johnny Summers on 8 November 1909 for the NSC British lightweight title.

First holders of NSC Challenge belts
Champion	Belt-winning bout	Defeated	Weight class
Freddie Welsh	8 November 1909	Johnny Summers	Lightweight
Tom Thomas	20 December 1909	Charlie Wilson	Middleweight
Jim Driscoll	14 February 1910	Seaman Arthur Hayes	Featherweight
Young Joseph	21 March 1910	Jack Goldswain	Welterweight
Digger Stanley	17 October 1910	Joe Bowker	Bantamweight
Billy Wells	24 April 1911	Iron Hague	Heavyweight
Sid Smith	4 December 1911	Joe Wilson	Flyweight
Dick Smith	9 March 1914	Dennis Haugh	Light-heavyweight

=== Racial restrictions and the colour bar ===
Eligibility for the Lonsdale Belt was restricted by a colour bar. John Harding suggests that the NSC's exclusion of black boxers was influenced by Jack Johnson's failure to honour an agreement to defend his title there in 1908–1909.

The British Boxing Board of Control's minutes for February 1929 referred to British title contestants being "of white parents". The earlier qualification had required only British nationality. Lord Lonsdale was said to have approved the revised wording. The restriction prevented Len Johnson from competing for a British title.

In July 1947, the Board agreed to remove the colour bar. The replacement rule took effect in 1948 and required contestants to have been born in Britain and to live there. Their fathers also had to have been British subjects and resident in Britain when the boxers were born.

=== 1936–present: British Boxing Board of Control ===
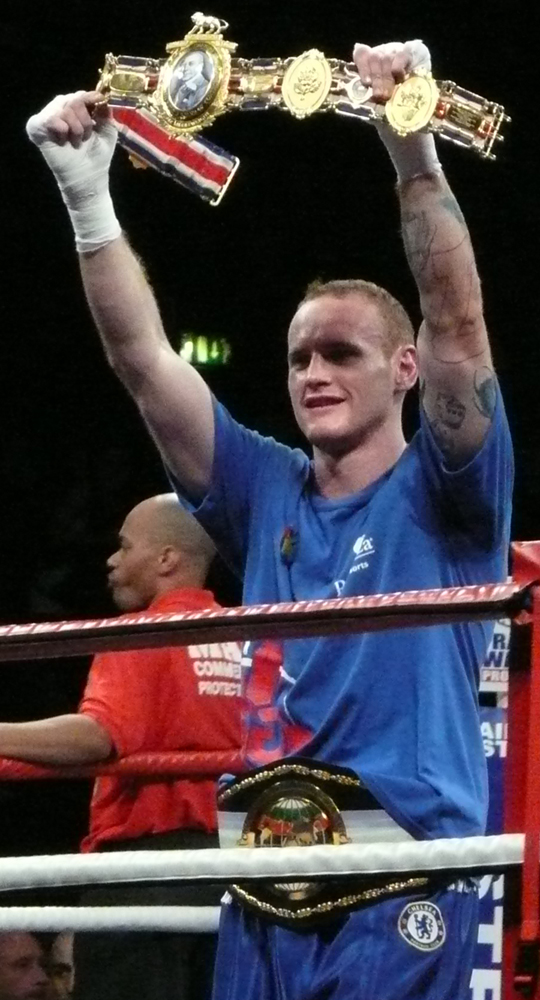
George Groves displays the BBBofC Lonsdale Belt.

In 1936, the British Boxing Board of Control (BBBofC) took over the issuing of Lonsdale Belts. Championship contests and the awarding of belts now required its permission. The new design replaced the two boxers on the central panel with an enamel portrait of Lord Lonsdale beneath a lion. Lonsdale had agreed to the use of his name and image in perpetuity.

The Board's belts did not carry the pension promised under the original NSC scheme. In November 1936, following enquiries from Dick Smith, Pat O'Keeffe and Tancy Lee, the new NSC asked the Board to take up the matter. Charles Donmall replied on the Board's behalf that it could do nothing and that the new belts carried no promise of a pension.

The last new nine-carat gold belt issued by the BBBofC was the lightweight belt won by Eric Boon in 1939. The last to be won outright was the heavyweight belt first held by Tommy Farr in 1937, which Henry Cooper secured in 1961.

After the Second World War, the belts were made from hallmarked sterling silver with gold plating, although production remained by hand. The design included a laurel-leaf border and four national emblems: the rose, thistle, daffodil and shamrock, replacing the earlier use of the rose alone.

Mappin & Webb closed its Midlands workshops in the 1970s. Concerned about a decline in the belts' appearance and construction, BBBofC secretary John Morris approached Fattorini's to produce a belt closer to the original design and quality. Writing in 2016, Harding gave the production cost of each belt as £14,000.

Fattorini was commissioned to manufacture the belts in the early 1980s. The silver components are die-stamped, machined and finished by hand. The enamel panels are hand-painted and fired before the metalwork is polished, plated with 24-carat gold and attached to red, white and blue ribbons.

First holders of the BBBofC Lonsdale Belt
Champion	Belt-winning bout	Defeated	Weight class
Benny Lynch	16 September 1936	Pat Palmer	Flyweight
Johnny McGrory	24 September 1936	Nel Tarleton	Featherweight
Jimmy Walsh	19 October 1936	Harry Mizler	Lightweight
Tommy Farr	15 March 1937	Ben Foord	Heavyweight
Jock McAvoy	27 April 1937	Eddie Phillips	Light-heavyweight
Johnny King	31 May 1937	Jackie Brown	Bantamweight
Jock McAvoy	25 October 1937	Jack Hyams	Middleweight
Jake Kilrain	21 February 1938	Jack Lord	Welterweight

=== First female champion ===
On 6 May 2023, Welsh boxer Lauren Price defeated Kirstie Bavington by unanimous decision in Birmingham to win the inaugural British women's welterweight title. She became the first woman to win a professional British boxing title and a Lonsdale Belt.

== Rule changes and the Lonsdale Badge ==
In 1987, the BBBofC decided to award only one belt to any boxer in each division. A boxer can, however, win belts outright in different weight classes.

Brian Rose welcomes Lonsdale Badge on Eurosport
Outright winner of the Lonsdale Belt, Brian Rose, talks to Eurosport about the introduction of the Lonsdale Badge

From 1 September 1999, a boxer had to win four British title bouts in the same weight division to keep the belt. The previous rule required three wins. At least one of the four wins had to be in a mandatory defence. John Morris, the Board's general secretary, cited the rising cost of making the belts and how quickly some boxers had won them outright.

The four-win requirement remains in the Board's 2026 rules. The Board can also award the belt outright if a champion goes three years after winning the title without being called on to defend it.

The BBBofC introduced the Lonsdale Badge in 2013 for outright winners to wear on their boxing shorts.

== Donations and auctions ==
The Lonsdale Belt won by Bombardier Billy Wells in 1911 is now kept at the Royal Artillery Barracks in Woolwich, London, and is not on display to the general public. Johnny Brown's Lonsdale Belt was donated to the Museum of London in 2010. In November 2000 the belt awarded to Randy Turpin in 1956 was auctioned for £23,000. Jack Hood displayed his welterweight belt above the bar at the Bell, the pub he ran. The belt remained in his family until 2011, when it sold at auction for £36,000.

In 1993, Henry Cooper sold all three of his belts for £42,000 after losing heavily on the Lloyd's insurance market. One of the belts, the last one made of gold, was sold for £22,000. The others sold for £10,000 each. Cooper was expecting £70,000 for the sale but was content they were all sold together.

== Theft ==
In 1915, Ted "Kid" Lewis left his featherweight Lonsdale Belt on display in a shop in Havana, where it was stolen. Police traced the belt after the thief tried to pawn it. Lewis borrowed money to retrieve it.

Don Cockell's Lonsdale Belt was stolen in 1952 from a glass cabinet at his home in London while he was out dancing. He did not own the £15,000 belt at the time, needing one more victory. In 2007, after attending a training camp, Bobby Vanzie returned to his home in Bradford and discovered his belt had been stolen. Tara promoter Jack Doughty said in the Manchester Evening News: "This is the best belt a boxer can win. It is better than those for world title fights, gold plated with a portrait of Lord Lonsdale in the middle."

On 8 March 2012, a safe containing Pat McAteer's Lonsdale Belt was stolen from his son's home in Annapolis, Maryland. Jack Petersen's Lonsdale Belt was stolen from his son's home in Burnham, Buckinghamshire in 2013. His son Robert, managing director of Cardiff PR firm Petersens, told Wales Online: "It's the family's crown jewels, a magnificent looking piece of art. It would be a terrible shame if it was melted down."

== Outright winners ==
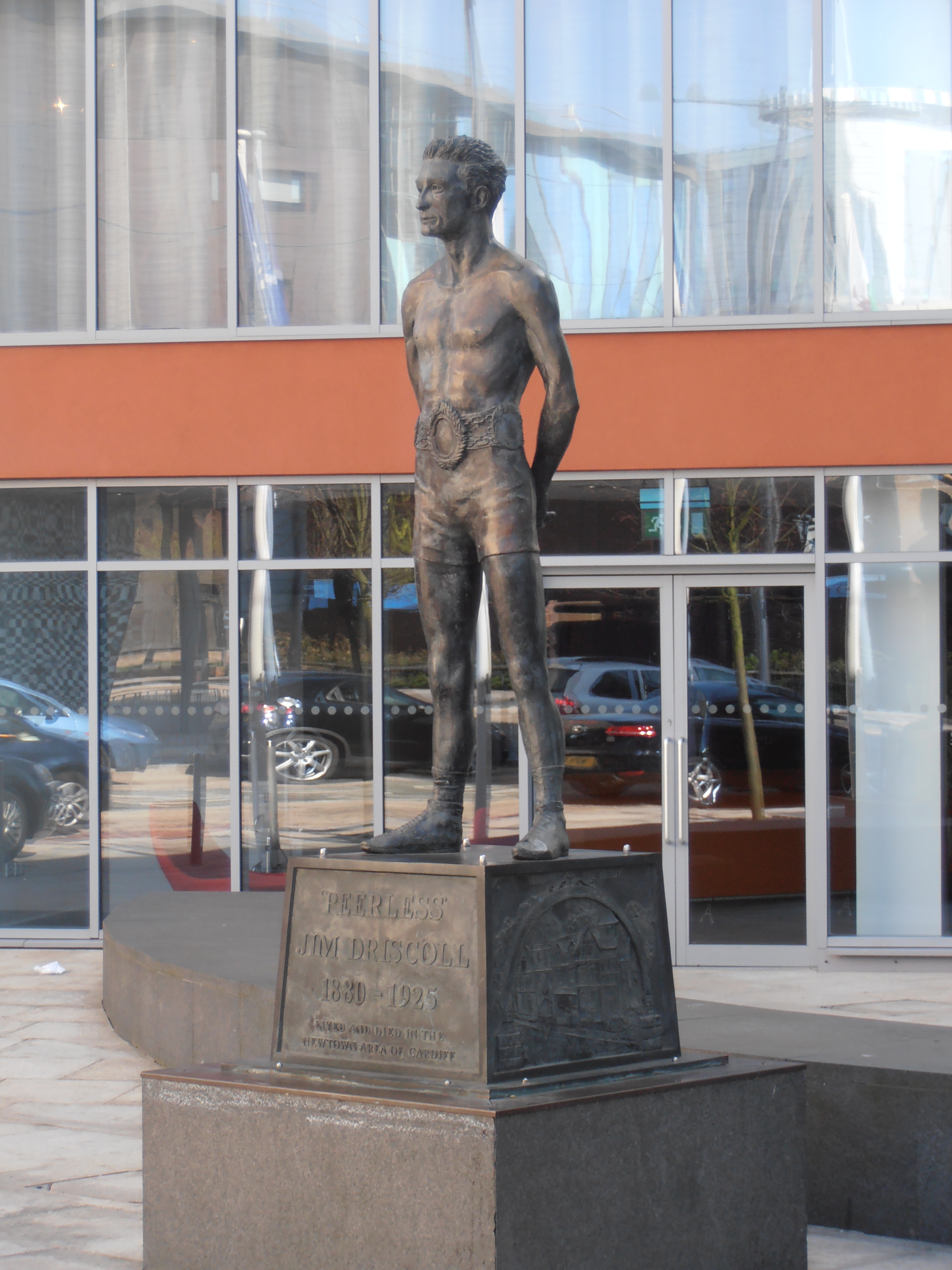
A statue of Jim Driscoll in Cardiff

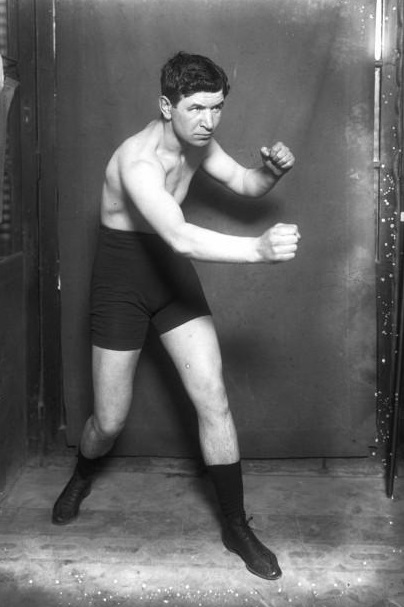
Pat O'Keeffe, an outright winner of the NSC middleweight belt

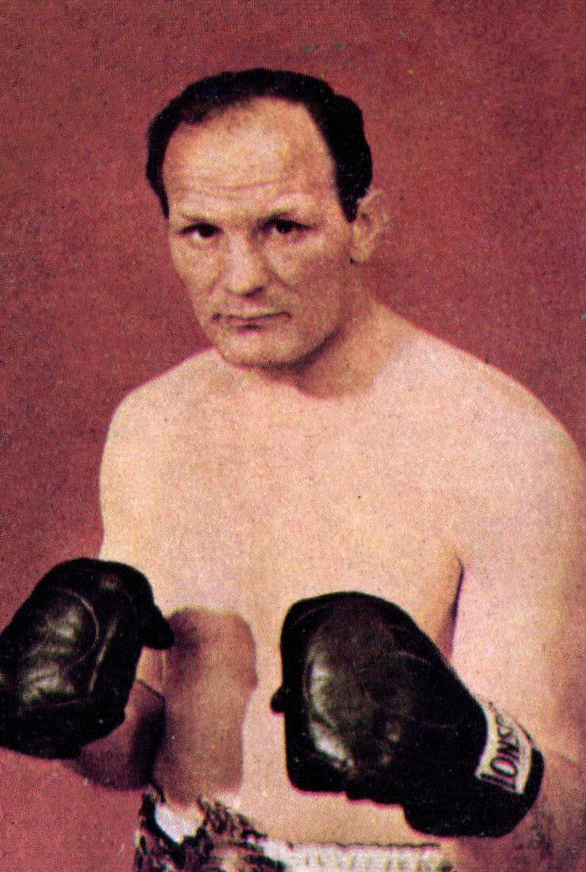
Henry Cooper

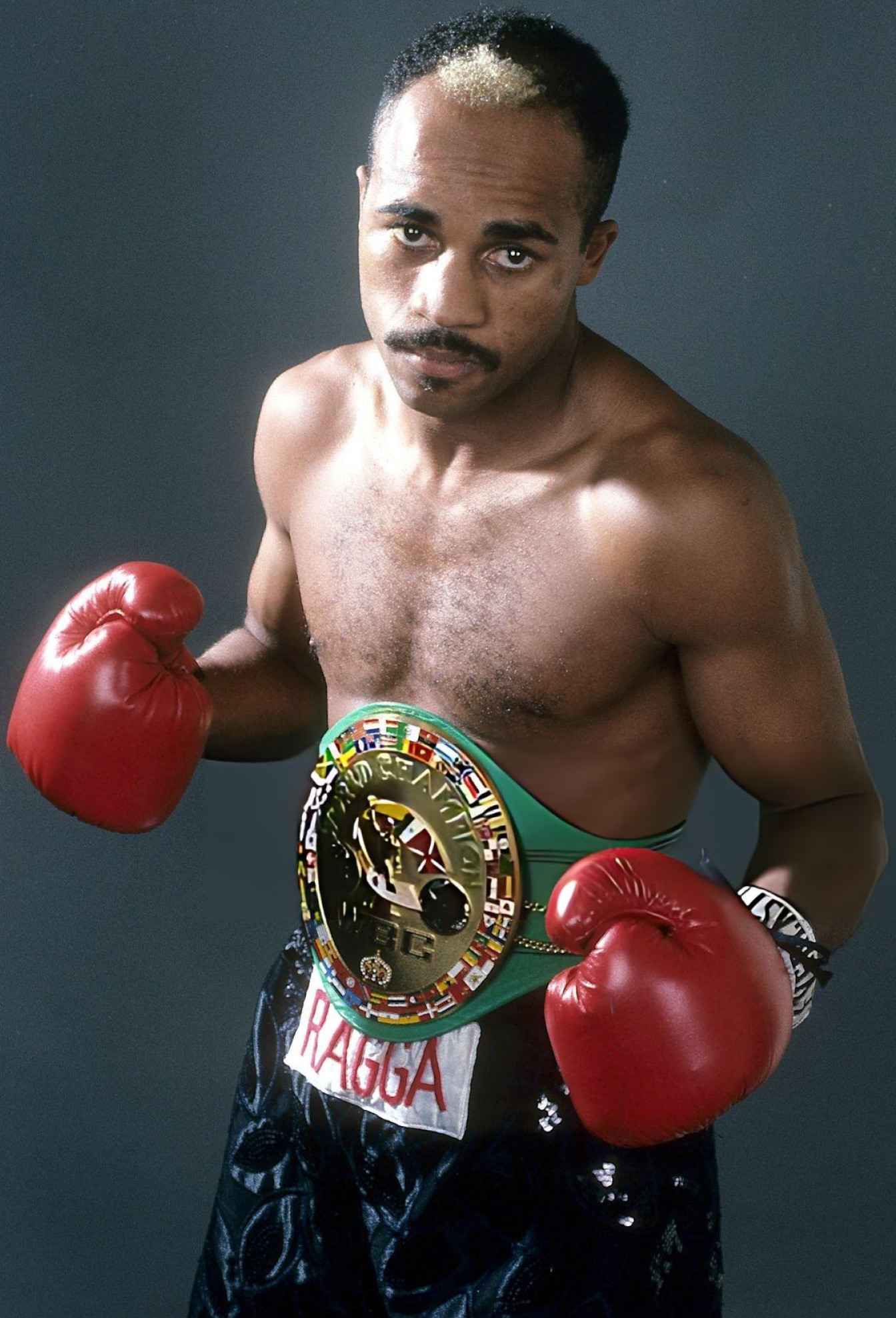
Lloyd Honeyghan

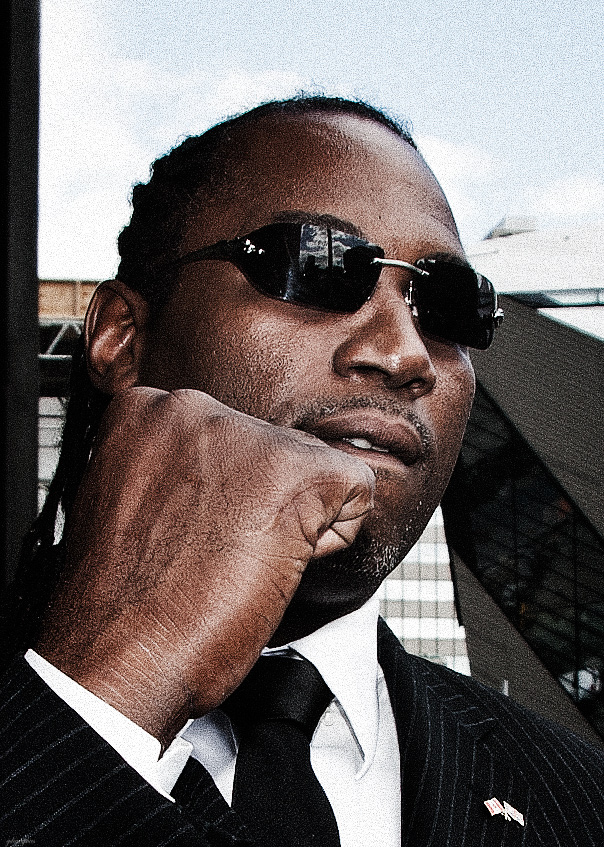
Lennox Lewis

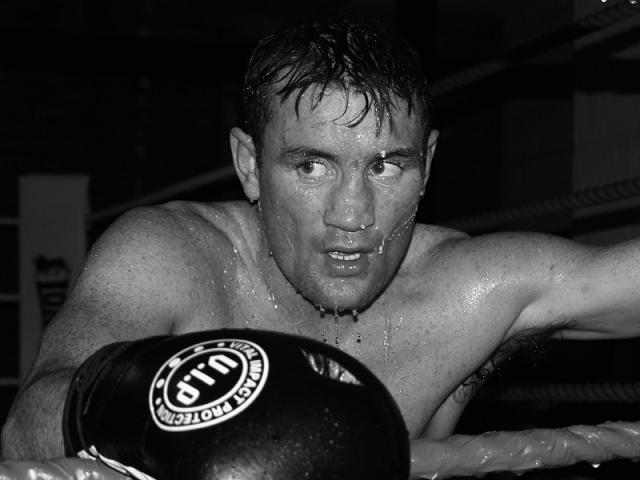
Michael Gomez

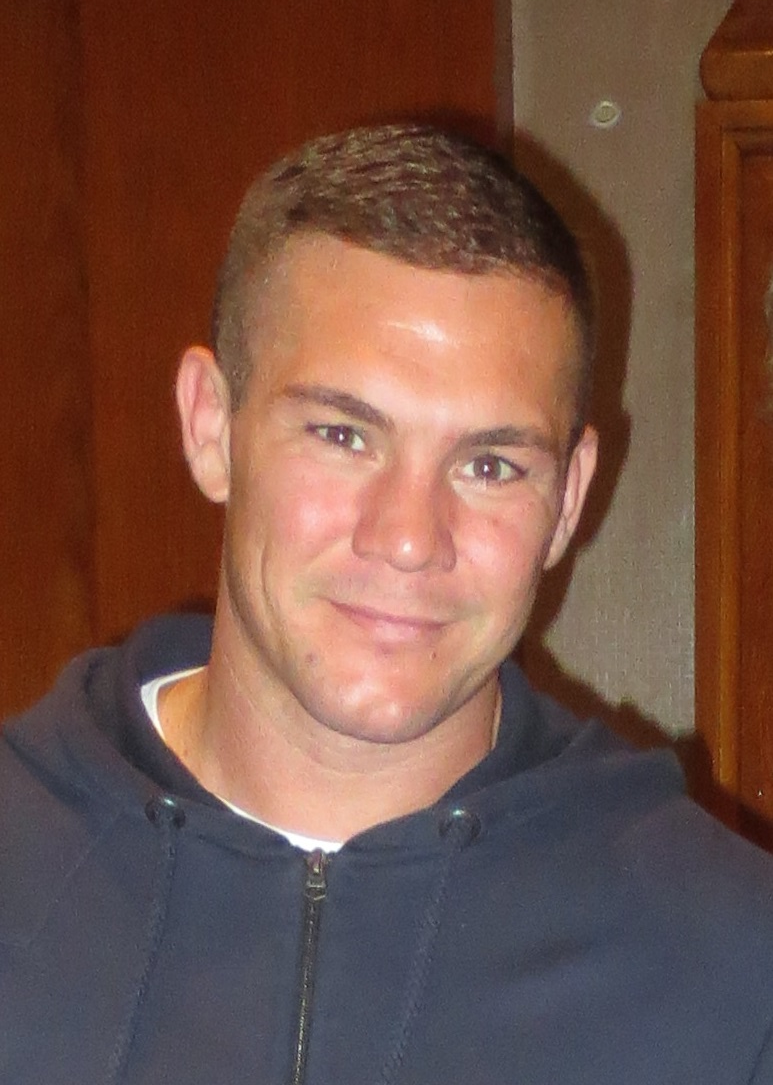
Jamie Moore

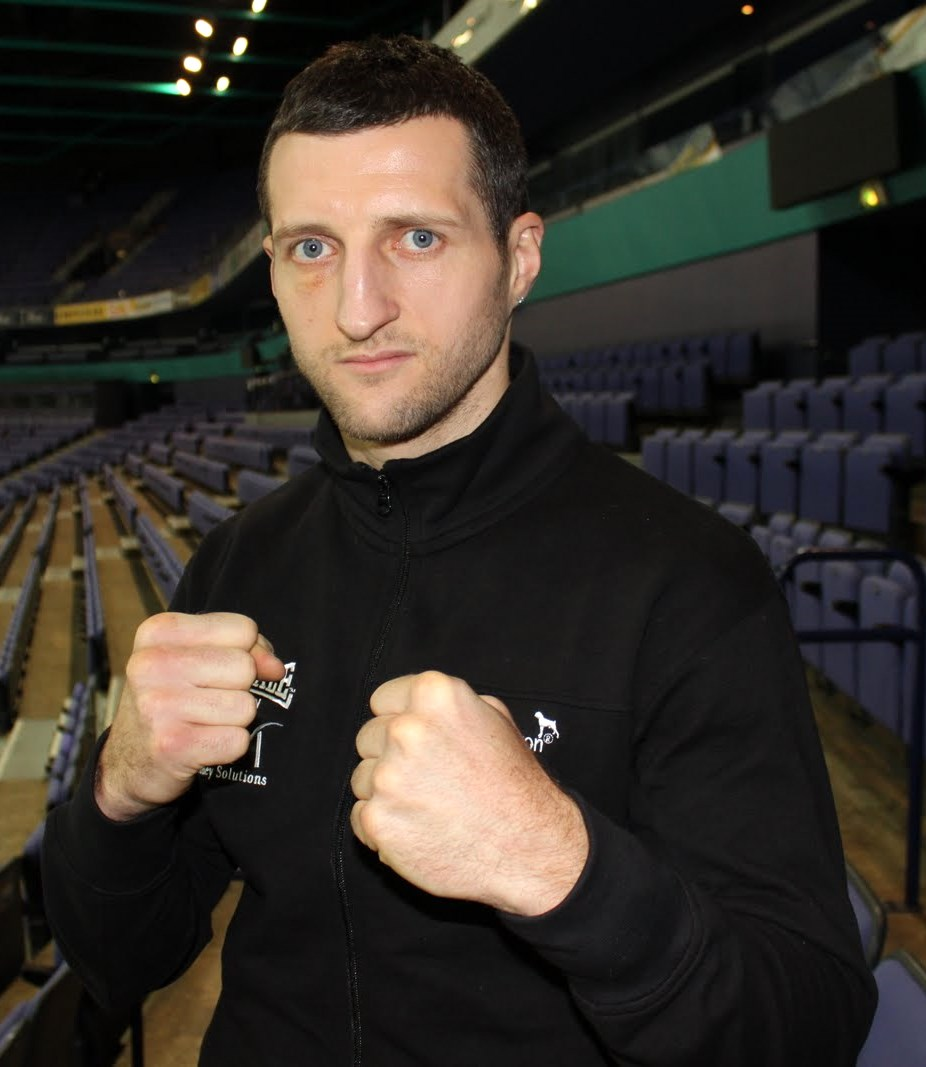
Carl Froch

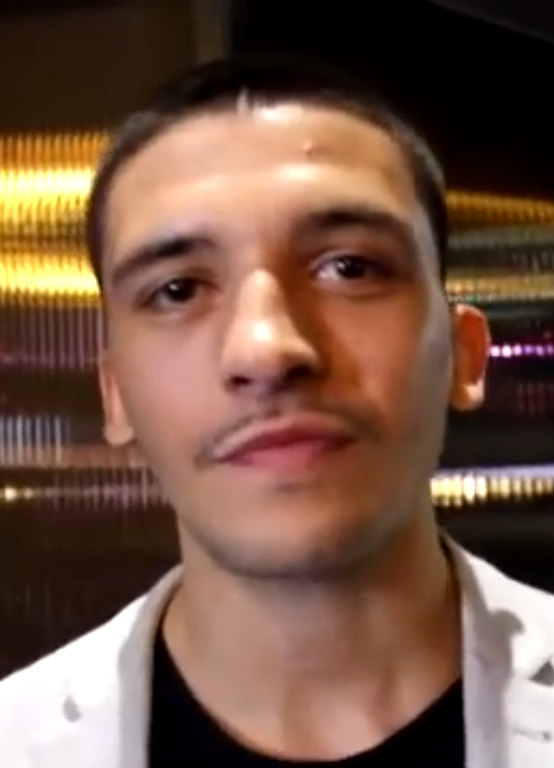
Lee Selby

Key
Mark	Meaning
***	Outright winner of three belts
**	Outright winner of two belts

Outright winners of the Lonsdale Belt
Boxer	Weight class	Year of outright ownership
Jim Driscoll	Featherweight	1911
Digger Stanley	Bantamweight	1912
Freddie Welsh	Lightweight	During the First World War
Bombardier Billy Wells	Heavyweight	1913
Johnny Basham	Welterweight	1916
Joe Fox	Bantamweight	1917
Jimmy Wilde	Flyweight	1917
Tancy Lee	Featherweight	1917
Dick Smith	Light-heavyweight	1918
Pat O'Keeffe	Middleweight	1918
Jim Higgins	Bantamweight	1921
Johnny Brown	Bantamweight	1925
Jack Hood	Welterweight	1926
Len Harvey	Middleweight	1930
Johnny Cuthbert	Featherweight	1930
Jackie Brown	Flyweight	1932
Dick Corbett	Bantamweight	1934
Nel Tarleton**	Featherweight	1934
Jock McAvoy	Middleweight	1935
Jack Petersen	Heavyweight	1935
Johnny King	Bantamweight	1937
Eric Boon	Lightweight	1939
Ernie Roderick	Welterweight	1941
Jackie Paterson	Flyweight	1943
Nel Tarleton**	Featherweight	1945
Billy Thompson	Lightweight	1950
Ronnie Clayton**	Featherweight	1950
Peter Keenan**	Bantamweight	1951
Ronnie Clayton**	Featherweight	1953
Terry Allen	Flyweight	1953
Wally Thom	Welterweight	1954
Randolph Turpin	Light-heavyweight	1956
Joe Lucy	Lightweight	1956
Peter Keenan**	Bantamweight	1957
Pat McAteer	Middleweight	1957
Charlie Hill	Featherweight	1958
Terry Downes	Middleweight	1960
Brian Curvis**	Welterweight	1961
Henry Cooper ***	Heavyweight	1961
Freddie Gilroy	Bantamweight	1962
Howard Winstone**	Featherweight	1962
Howard Winstone**	Featherweight	1963
Chic Calderwood	Light-heavyweight	1963
Brian Curvis**	Welterweight	1964
Henry Cooper ***	Heavyweight	1964
Walter McGowan	Flyweight	1966
Maurice Cullen	Lightweight	1966
Henry Cooper ***	Heavyweight	1967
Johnny Pritchett	Middleweight	1967
Alan Rudkin	Bantamweight	1969
Jimmy Anderson	Super-featherweight	1969
Ralph Charles	Welterweight	1971
Ken Buchanan	Lightweight	1973
John McCluskey	Flyweight	1974
Evan Armstrong	Featherweight	1974
Chris Finnegan	Light-heavyweight	1975
Joey Singleton	Super-lightweight	1975
Alan Minter	Middleweight	1976
Maurice Hope	Super-welterweight	1976
Jim Watt	Lightweight	1977
Jimmy Batten	Super-welterweight	1978
Bunny Johnson	Light-heavyweight	1979
Colin Powers	Super-lightweight	1979
Johnny Owen	Bantamweight	1979
Pat Thomas	Super-welterweight	1979
Kevin Finnegan	Middleweight	1979
Clinton McKenzie**	Super-lightweight	1979
Pat Cowdell	Featherweight	1980
Roy Gumbs	Middleweight	1982
Tom Collins	Light-heavyweight	1983
Dennis Andries	Light-heavyweight	1984
George Feeney	Lightweight	1984
Hugh Russell	Bantamweight	1985
Colin Jones	Welterweight	1985
Lloyd Honeyghan	Welterweight	1985
Prince Rodney	Super-welterweight	1985
Tony Willis	Lightweight	1986
Robert Dickie	Featherweight	1986
Clinton McKenzie**	Super-lightweight	1987
Kirkland Laing	Welterweight	1987
Lloyd Christie	Super-lightweight	1987
Charlie Magri	Flyweight	1987
Tony Sibson	Middleweight	1987
Horace Notice	Heavyweight	1987
Herol Graham	Middleweight	1988
Tony Wilson	Light-heavyweight	1989
Pat Clinton	Flyweight	1989
Billy Hardy	Bantamweight	1989
Paul Hodkinson	Featherweight	1989
Johnny Nelson	Cruiserweight	1990
Colin McMillan	Featherweight	1991
John Doherty	Super-featherweight	1991
Carl Crook	Lightweight	1991
Andy Holligan	Super-lightweight	1992
Robbie Regan	Flyweight	1992
Lennox Lewis	Heavyweight	1992
Andy Till	Super-welterweight	1993
Sean Murphy	Featherweight	1993
Crawford Ashley	Light-heavyweight	1994
Neville Brown	Middleweight	1994
Drew Docherty	Bantamweight	1994
Francis Ampofo	Flyweight	1994
Billy Schwer	Lightweight	1994
Robert McCracken	Super-welterweight	1995
Ross Hale	Super-lightweight	1995
Sam Storey	Super-middleweight	1995
Delroy Bryan	Welterweight	1995
Michael Ayers	Lightweight	1995
Floyd Havard	Super-featherweight	1995
Terry Dunstan	Cruiserweight	1996
Richie Wenton	Super-bantamweight	1996
Ryan Rhodes	Super-welterweight	1997
Paul Ingle	Featherweight	1997
Ady Lewis	Flyweight	1997
Geoff McCreesh	Welterweight	1998
Jon Jo Irwin	Featherweight	1998
Charles Shepherd	Super-featherweight	1998
Michael Brodie	Super-bantamweight	1998
David Starie	Super-middleweight	1999
Ensley Bingham	Super-welterweight	1999
Derek Roche	Welterweight	1999
Julius Francis	Heavyweight	1999
Michael Gomez	Super-featherweight	2000
Bobby Vanzie	Lightweight	2000
Bruce Scott	Cruiserweight	2001
Nicky Booth	Bantamweight	2001
Michael Alldis	Super-bantamweight	2002
Danny Williams	Heavyweight	2002
Howard Eastman	Middleweight	2003
Neil Sinclair	Welterweight	2003
Mark Hobson	Cruiserweight	2004
David Barnes	Welterweight	2004
Dazzo Williams	Featherweight	2004
Jamie Moore	Super-welterweight	2005
Junior Witter	Super-lightweight	2005
Michael Hunter	Super-bantamweight	2005
Matt Skelton	Heavyweight	2005
Scott Dann	Middleweight	2005
Alex Arthur	Super-featherweight	2005
Graham Earl	Lightweight	2005
Carl Froch	Super-middleweight	2006
Carl Johanneson	Super-featherweight	2007
Ian Napa	Bantamweight	2008
Kell Brook	Welterweight	2009
Jason Booth	Super-bantamweight	2009
John Murray	Lightweight	2010
John Simpson	Featherweight	2010
Stuart Hall	Bantamweight	2011
Brian Rose	Super-welterweight	2012
Lee Selby	Featherweight	2013
Frankie Gavin	Welterweight	2013
Billy Joe Saunders	Middleweight	2013
Jon-Lewis Dickinson	Cruiserweight	2014
Bradley Skeete	Welterweight	2017
Martin J. Ward	Super-featherweight	2017
Ryan Walsh	Featherweight	2017
Lewis Ritson	Lightweight	2018
Kash Farooq	Bantamweight	2019
Brad Foster	Super-bantamweight	2020
Ekow Essuman	Welterweight	2022
Dalton Smith	Super-lightweight	2023

== See also ==
- Evolution of professional boxing
