= Bobby Neill =

Scottish boxer (1933–2022)

Personal information
- Nationality: British
- Born: Robert Neill; 10 October 1933 Edinburgh, Scotland
- Died: 15 February 2022 (aged 88) London, England
- Weight: Featherweight

Boxing career

Boxing record
- Total fights: 35
- Wins: 28
- Win by KO: 23
- Losses: 7

Robert Neill (10 October 1933 – 15 February 2022) was a Scottish boxer who was British Featherweight Champion between 1959 and 1960.

== Early life ==
Neill was born in Edinburgh on 10 October 1933, the son of Andrew Neill, a bookmaker and Sarah Richardson. He had an older brother Frank, a younger brother Andrew, and two younger sisters, Myra and Marcella. Neill attended Trinity Academy, and boxed out of the Sparta Amateur Boxing Club, representing Scotland at amateur level despite suffering serious injuries in a car crash.

== Boxing career ==
Neill made his professional debut in May 1955 with a second round stoppage of Denny Dennis. He won his first 15 fights, including an eighth round stoppage of Matt Fulton in September 1956 to take the vacant BBBofC Scottish Area featherweight title, and a first round stoppage of Charlie Hill in December. He was named 'Best Young Boxer of the Year' in 1957 at the British Boxing Writers Awards. He suffered his first loss in January 1957, when he was stopped by the then unbeaten Jimmy Brown. His second defeat came three months later against Victor Pepeder. Later that year he was again seriously injured in a car crash, the resulting surgery shortening one of his legs, with surgeons telling him that he would never box again, but despite this Neill regained his fitness and continued to have success in the ring.

He challenged for Hill's British featherweight title in April 1959 at Nottingham Ice Rink, stopping the defending champion in the ninth round after knocking him down nine times. Two months later he knocked out Terry Spinks in the ninth at the Empire Pool, Wembley. His next fight was a loss to Davey Moore, the American stopping him in the first round.

Neill started 1960 with wins over Alberto Serti, Germain Vivier, and Jimmy Carson, but was stopped in the fifth round in June by Johnny Kidd. In September he made the first defence of his British title against Spinks at the Royal Albert Hall. The fight was stopped in the seventh round due to cuts sustained by Neill. They met again for the title in November, Spinks this time knocking out Neill in the fourteenth round, leaving him in a coma and requiring surgery to remove a blood clot from his brain.

== Post-fight career ==
Neill subsequently retired from boxing, and within a few years began a second career as a trainer, working with Spinks and other boxers such as Alan Minter, Lloyd Honeyghan, Alan Rudkin, and Vernon Sollas. He also worked as a boxing adviser on television shows including Minder.

== Personal life and death ==
Neill married Laurie Steadman in May 1961, they had a daughter Michelle born in 1962 and a son Fraser born in 1965. After Laurie died he married Maria Zola.

Neill died of complications related to COVID-19 in London on 15 February 2022, at the age of 88. His funeral was held at Enfield Crematorium on 10 March 2022.

== Honours ==
In 2004, Neill was inducted into the Scottish Boxing Hall of Fame.
