= Enfield Crematorium =

Cemetery in London, England

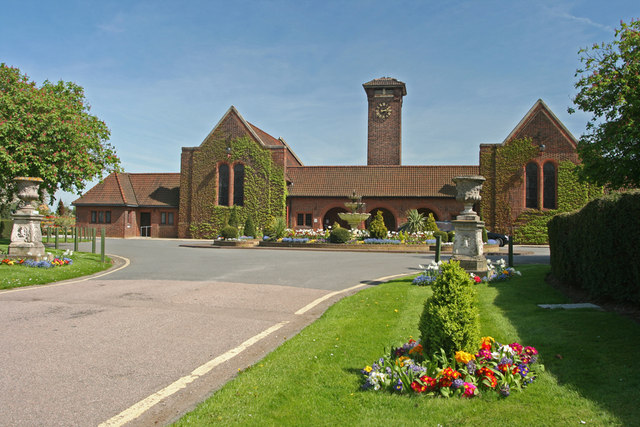
- Water fountain and chapels
- Interactive map of Enfield Crematorium

Details
- Established: 1938
- Location: Great Cambridge Road, Enfield, Greater London, EN1 4DS
- Country: England
- Coordinates: 51.6696°N 0.0517°W
- Type: Public
- Owned by: Dignity Crematoria Ltd
- Size: 50 acres (20 ha)
- Website: Official website
- Find a Grave: Enfield Crematorium

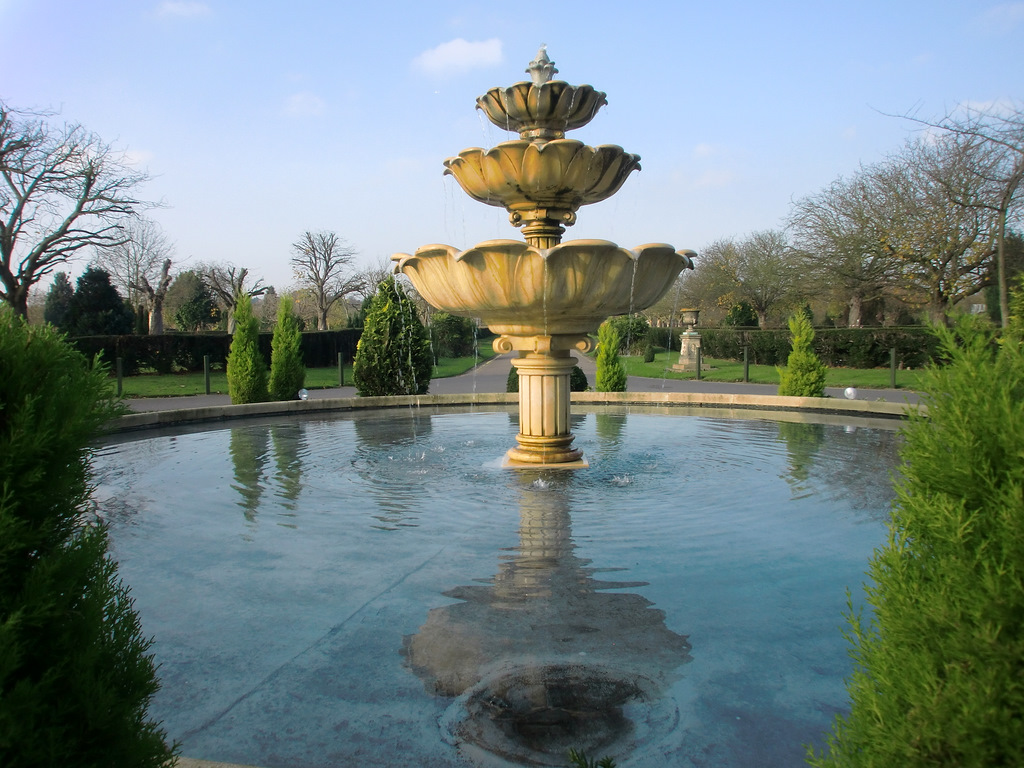
Triple tiered fountain

Enfield Crematorium is a crematorium located on the Great Cambridge Road, Enfield, London. It was opened in 1938 and consists of 50 acres (20 ha) of land, most of which is dedicated to the gardens of remembrance. The crematorium is a local listed red brick building.

== History ==
Enfield Crematorium was opened by the Tottenham and Wood Green Burial Board in 1938, and the landscaping of its grounds forms a cohesive whole with the main buildings, which include a pair of chapels connected by a triple-arched arcade. An avenue of horse chestnuts leads from the entrance lodge; formal gardens were created to the east of the crematorium, while a more informal sunken Garden of Remembrance to the north west. A yew-lined approach from Great Cambridge Road is flanked by a series of hedged and walled geometrical gardens.

The site contains two red-brick gabled and pan-tiled chapels connected by a triple-arched arcade and either side of a central clock tower designed by Sir Edward Guy Dawber and a triple tiered fountain. It has the capacity for larger services as each chapel can accommodate up to 150 seats. The outer areas contain a courtyard for viewing floral tributes, connected with cloistered walkways. There is also a small Room of Remembrance for visitors who wish to view the Book of Remembrance.

The Garden of Remembrance contains an octagonal Portland stone memorial erected by the Commonwealth War Graves Commission to the memory of 55 British service personnel who died during World War II and were cremated here.

== Notable cremations ==
- David Byron (1947–1985), musician
- Charles Holden (1875-1960), architect (ashes scattered, grounds of Friends' Meeting House, Hertford)
- Arthur Martin-Leake (1874–1953), Victoria Cross recipient, with Bar (ashes buried at High Cross, Hertfordshire)
- Bobby Smith (1933–2010), footballer
- Theodore Veale (1892–1980), World War I Victoria Cross recipient
- Bobby Neill (1933–2022), Scottish boxer
