= Charlie Hill (boxer) =

Scottish boxer

Personal information
- Nationality: British
- Born: 20 June 1930 Flemington, Scotland
- Died: 3 July 2010 (aged 80) Brisbane, Australia
- Weight: Featherweight

Boxing career

Boxing record
- Total fights: 36
- Wins: 31
- Win by KO: 14
- Losses: 5

Charlie Hill (20 June 1930 – 3 July 2010) was a Scottish boxer who was British featherweight champion between 1956 and 1959.

== Career ==
Born in Flemington, the son of a steel worker, and based in Cambuslang, Hill began an apprenticeship as a shipyard electrician at Harland & Wolff in Glasgow at the age of 14, and took up boxing at the Halfway Miners club in Cambuslang and later the Scottish National club in Bridgeton, winning West and Scottish (featherweight, 1953) titles as an amateur.

He made his professional debut in June 1953 with a points win over Art Belec. He lost by disqualification in his second fight, but went on to win his next 15 before facing Chic Brogan in December 1954 for the vacant BBBofC Scottish Area featherweight title; Hill won on points to take the title.

After a win over Jacques Bataille in June 1955, Hill was set to challenge for Ray Famechon's European title later that month, but the fight was cancelled.

He was due to face Sammy McCarthy in November 1955 in a final eliminator for the British title, but due to a bout of influenza was instructed in October not to fight or train for the remainder of the year; He returned to the ring at the end of December with a points win over Jesus Rubio.

He finally got to challenge for Northern Irishman Kelly's British title in February 1956 at the Kings Hall, Belfast; Kelly had Hill down twice, but Hill got the points verdict, sparking a riot among the audience.

After winning his next three fights, he was stopped in the first round in December 1956 by Bobby Neill, and was stopped in his next fight by Joe Quinn. He won his next two, before making the first defence of his British title in October 1957 against Jimmy Brown; Brown had Hill down twice, but he recovered and knocked the challenger out in the tenth round.

In December 1957 he faced Percy Lewis for the Commonwealth title vacated by Hogan Bassey, Lewis stopping him in the tenth round.

In July 1958 he stopped Brogan in the second defence of his British title, to win the Lonsdale Belt outright. He made a third defence in April 1959 against Neill, losing the title after being stopped in the ninth round, having been knocked down nine times.

This proved to be Hill's final fight, and after retiring from boxing he moved with his family to work in Rugby, Warwickshire before emigrating to Australia. He died the morning of Saturday 3 July 2010, in Brisbane, Australia, aged 80.
