= Al Phillips =

English boxer

Personal information
- Nickname: The Aldgate Tiger
- Nationality: (United Kingdom) English
- Born: 25 January 1920 England
- Died: 7 February 1999 (aged 79) Sunnyvale Close, Stanmore, Berkshire, London
- Height: 5 ft 4 1/2 in (1.64 m)
- Weight: British Featherweight Champion; EBU Featherweight champion

Boxing career
- Stance: Orthodox

Boxing record
- Total fights: 90
- Wins: 77
- Win by KO: 33
- Losses: 6
- Draws: 3

Al "The Aldgate Tiger" Phillips (25 January 1920 – 7 February 1999) was a Jewish English professional featherweight/lightweight boxer of the 1930s, 1940s and 1950s, who won the European Boxing Union (EBU) featherweight title, and British Empire featherweight title. Phillips took both the British Empire and sanctioned British Boxing Board of Control (BBBofC) British featherweight Title against the powerful black feather British Guianan Cliff Anderson in fifteen rounds at Royal Albert Hall in Kensington, England in 1947.

He was an unsuccessful challenger for the BBBofC British featherweight title, against Nel Tarleton in February 1945, and Ronnie Clayton in February 1951. His professional fighting weight varied from 124.5 lb (56.5 kg; 8 st 12.5 lb), (featherweight) to 137 lb (62 kg; 9 st 11 lb), (welterweight). The Ring ranked Al Phillips as the third best featherweight in the world in the mid-1940s and between 1944 and 1951, he remained a top ten featherweight in the world for 44 months.

== Professional boxing career ==
Phillips was an action packed, two fisted pressure boxer who lacked the finesse of many earlier British and European champions. Former British and many European champions were expected to hit and retreat or avoid blows using ringcraft and long range boxing. Despite having fourteen years on Phillips, Ned Tarleton, a classic English stylist, gave Phillips problems in the ring.

== Winning three bouts for the British Feather title ==
He won his first eliminator bout for the British featherweight title in a sixth round disqualification against Len Davies, on 24 April 1943 at the Queensbury Club in Soho. Davies would later contend unsuccessfully for the Welsh Area BBofC Featherweight title in 1950. Phillips won his second eliminator bout for the British Featherweight title on 24 April 1944, against Jim Brady at Colston Hall in Leeds in a ten-round points decision. On 21 June 1944, Phillips won a third eliminator for the British Featherweight title by a first-round knockout of George Pook at the Queensbury Club in Soho.

=== Attempt at British feather title, 1945 ===
On 25 February 1945, Phillips lost to Nel Tarleton for British Empire featherweight championship, in a fifteen-round points decision in Manchester. The fight was described as "one of the most sensational Britain had seen in many years". Tarleton was thirty-nine at the time of the bout, to Phillips fledgling twenty-five years. Tarleton, though in trouble at times, held on using ringcraft and finesse against the power and constant attack of Phillips. Tarleton regained the Lonsdale belt which he had won for the first time in 1931. The Sydney Morning Herald wrote that Tarleton "brilliantly outpointed Phillips".

On 3 July 1945 Phillips lost to Dave Crowley in an eight-round points decision in Soho. He defeated Crowley on 12 June in an eight rounds points decision at the same location.

On 3 October 1945, Phillips defeated black Montreal boxer Danny Webb in a sixth-round knockout at Seymoure Hall in Marylebone. With his aggressive style, Philips scored eight knockdowns in the first round, the first two coming from right hooks. In a rough bout, Phillips went down from a right hook to the jaw from Webb in the third, Webb's best round. Phillips attacked again in the fourth putting Webb down for a two-second count, and for the remaining two rounds dominated the bout. Phillips scored in the sixth with a series of straight lefts and then dropped Webb for the full count with a short right hook. On 16 April 1945 Phillips lost to Crowley at the Royal Albert Hall in an eight-round points decision. The victory confirmed Crowley's victory on a fourth round foul on at Newington on 18 December 1944 by referee Jack Hart. In their April bout, there was bad blood between the two, and Crowley took the sting from Phillips blows with a smothering defense, and gained points with left hand jabs, especially during the final rounds. His performance in the final rounds were sufficient to win the points decision.

== British Featherweight Champion, 1947 ==
On 18 March 1947, Phillips officially took the British Empire and sanctioned BBofC Featherweight Title against black feather British Guianan Cliff Anderson in fifteen rounds at Royal Albert Hall in Kensington, England. The decision of the referee Peter Muir was not popular with the crowd.

Phillips defended the title for the first time against Anderson on 1 July 1947 in an eighth of fifteen round disqualification for an illegal kidney punch at Olympia, Kensington. In their hard-fought contest in July, Anderson's hard rights to the body floored Phillips twice in the second, once in the third for a count of five, and in the sixth he was on his back for a count of five before being saved by the bell. Anderson was knocked down once in the third, lost the fourth, and was less aggressive in the eighth when the referee called him for the kidney punch that ended the title match and allowed Phillips to retain the title. The decision, of referee Andrew Smyth was not popular with the crowd.

== EBU European Feather Champ, 1947 ==
Phillips took the EBU European Featherweight Title against French boxer Ray Famechon on 27 May 1947 in an eighth round disqualification of Famchon for a head-butt that put Phillips on the canvas. Phillips took the title, though he had been down five times in the seventh round from blows by his opponent. The decision was not popular with the crowd. The title had been vacated by Ermano Bonnetti.

== Losing all titles, Sept 1947 ==
On 11 September 1947, Phillips lost all three titles, the British Empire, BBofC, and European EBU lightweight title against Ron Clayton of Blackpool at the Anfield football stadium in Liverpool.

In his final attempt at the BBofC Featherweight title, Phillips lost to Ron Clayton in a more popular fifteen round points decision at the Ice Stadium in Nottingham on 26 February 1951. Clayton floored Phillips twice in the title match.

== Life after boxing ==
After his retirement from boxing, Phillips became a successful matchmaker and boxing promoter based in the London area. The best known of the boxers he managed was British heavyweight champion Brian London, a contender for the World title who was a fixture in English boxing in the 1950s and 1960s. On 8 February 1965 he promoted a fight between George Walker and London. Phillips was an avid golfer during his retirement, and a member of the Stanmore Club. He died on 7 February 1999 in Stanmore, Middlesex London, and was survived by his wife Sissy, and one daughter.

== Selected fights ==
6 Wins, 3 Losses
Result	Opponent(s)	Date	Location	Duration	Notes
Win	Jim Brady	24 April 1944	Leeds	10 Rounds	Eliminator for Brit. Feather Title
Win	George Pook	21 June 1944	Soho	1st Round KO	Eliminator for Brit. Feather Title
Win	Len Davies	2 Aug 1944	Soho	6 Rounds DQ	Eliminator for Brit. Feather Title
Loss	Nel Tarleton	23 Feb 1945	Manchester	15 Rounds	Final for Brit. Empire. Feather Title
Win	Cliff Anderson	18 Mar 1947	Kensington, W. London	15 Rounds	Won Brit. Empire. Feather Title
Win	Ray Famechon	27 May 1947	Kensington, W. London	8 of 15 Foul	Kept Brit. Emp. Feather Title
Win	Cliff Anderson	1 Jul 1947	Kensington, W. London	8 of 15 DQ	Kept Brit. Emp. Feather Title
Loss	Ronnie Clayton	11 Sep 1947	Liverpool	15 Rounds	Lost European, Brit. Emp. and BB of C Feather Title
Loss	Ronnie Clayton	26 Feb 1951	Nottingham	15 Rounds	For European, Brit. Emp. and BB of C Feather Title
