= Fernando Gagnon =

Canadian boxer

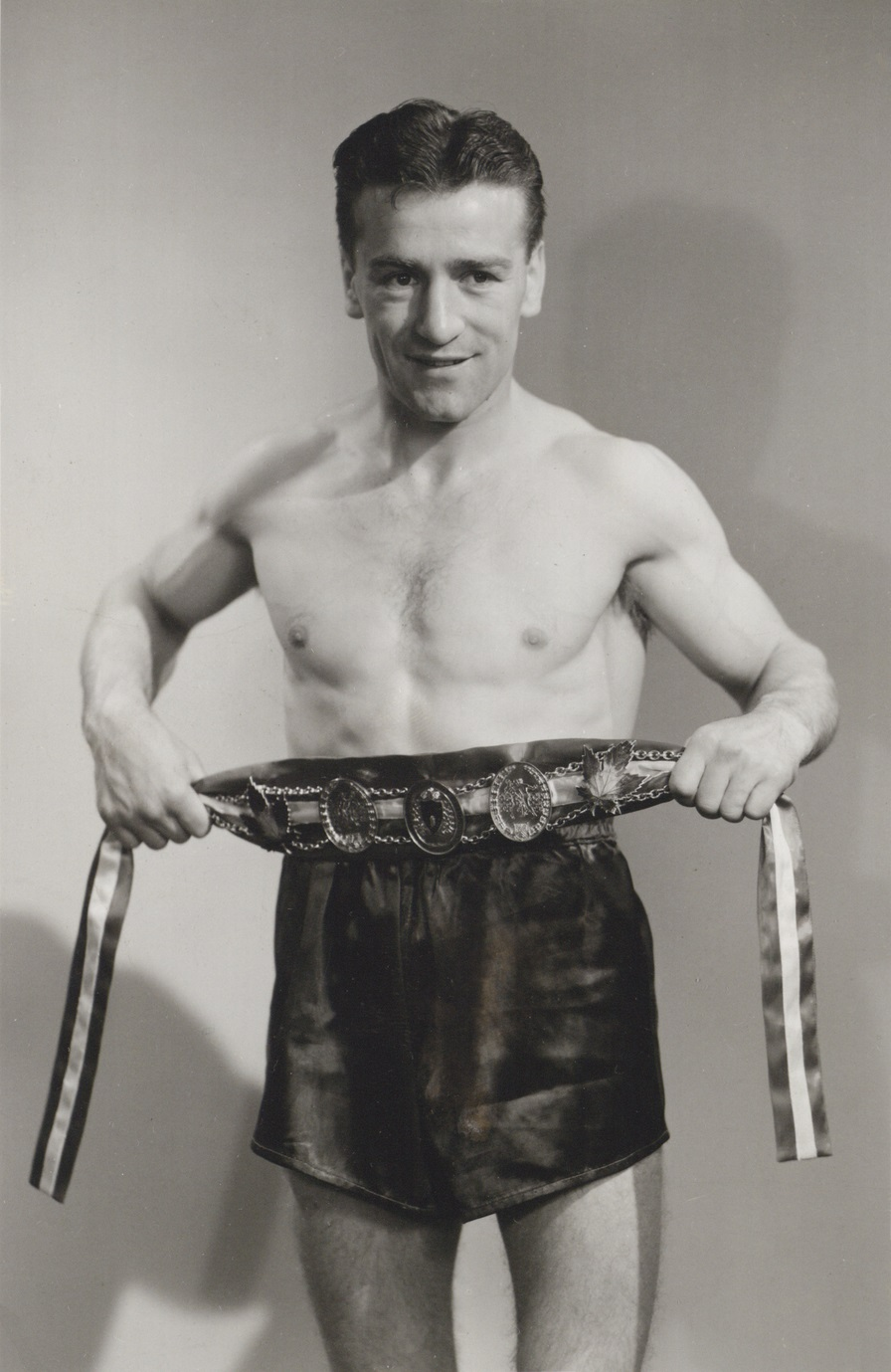

Personal information
- Nationality: (Canada) Canadian
- Born: Fernando Gagnon Quebec, Canada
- Died: Canada
- Occupation: Boxer
- Height: 5 ft 2½ in (159cm)
- Weight: Bantamweight

Boxing career

Boxing record
- Total fights: 142
- Wins: 104
- Win by KO: 76
- Losses: 30
- Draws: 8

Fernando Gagnon was a Canadian professional bantamweight boxer who held the Canadian bantamweight boxing championship from 1946 to 1956.

== Early life ==
Fernando Gagnon was born in Quebec, Canada, during the 1920s.

== Professional boxing career ==
Gagnon turned professional in Asbestos, Quebec, in 1942 and reeled off eight straight knockout wins before dropping his first bout.

He enlisted in the Canadian Army. While training under Captain Leo Bouchard's command in the army in 1944, Gagnon formed a relationship that led to a professional partnership after Bouchard's retirement from military service in 1946.

=== Taking the Canadian bantamweight championship, August 1946 ===
Gagnon scored a fifth-round knockout of Eddie Petrin to win the Canadian bantamweight championship on August 26, 1946, in Quebec City.

He earned an eighth-place ranking among bantamweights from The Ring magazine in 1947.

The National Boxing Association ranked Gagnon among the logical contenders for Manuel Ortiz's world bantamweight championship in the summer of 1948.

The 24-year-old bantamweight champion of Canada made a successful defense of his title in August 1949, earning a unanimous decision over Vancouver's top-ranked Jackie Turner before a crowd of 2,500.

Gagon came under the management of Harry Sheppard. He embarked from New York in January 1950 for a series of fights in Europe and South Africa. After defeating Teddy Gardner in a British Empire bantamweight eliminator in Newcastle on February 13, 1950, Gagnon fell to Bobby Boland at Streatham Ice Rink in London on February 21, 1950. In Johannesburg, he faced unbeaten Vic Toweel, who held both the South African and Empire titles. The bout for the British Empire (Commonwealth Boxing Council) bantamweight title was held at Wembley Sports Stadium in Johannesburg on April 8, 1950. Gagnon was outpointed by Toweel over the full 15-round distance. After knocking out his next opponent in Cape Town, he returned to Newcastle, where he was stopped by 1948 Olympian Tommy Proffitt via knockout on May 5, 1950.

Upon returning to Canada, he went 4-2 during a campaign in Quebec City. He went on to beat Claude Meunier with a fourth-round knockout to retain the Canadian bantamweight championship on June 5, 1951. After three straight knockout wins, he fought Dado Marino to a ten-round draw during the summer of 1951. Gagnon stood as the only Canadian fighter listed in the NBA's year-end rankings for 1951.

Gagnon lost consecutive decision defeats to Pappy Gault in 1952 while challenging for the North American bantamweight championship on both occasions.

In 1954, he made three successful defenses of his Canadian title against Stan Almond, Joe Edwards, and Clarence Doucette.

After 13 years as a professional, Gagnon was within one fight of a world title challenge against Raúl Macías. A 1955 matchup with Johnny O'Brien was scheduled for Portland, with Boston promoter Sam Silverman calling Gagnon the world's hardest hitter in his weight class. The Gagnon-O'Brien series stood at 1-1, with each man having won a split decision. The 15-round North American bantamweight title fight was canceled indefinitely when O'Brien declined to undergo the required ringside weigh-in.

In his final professional bout on November 28, 1955, Gagnon retained the Canadian bantamweight championship with a unanimous decision victory over Gerry Simpson.

At 32, Gagnon hung up his gloves in May 1956 while still Canadian bantamweight champion, with his title automatically being declared vacant upon his retirement.

== Professional boxing record ==
142 fights	104 wins	30 losses
By knockout	76	3
By decision	28	27
Draws	8	

== Legacy ==
With eight successful defenses, he holds the record for most Canadian Boxing Federation bantamweight title defenses.

Achievements
Preceded by Eddie Petrin	Canadian Bantamweight Champion; August 26, 1946 – May 01, 1956	Succeeded by Vacant
