= Ronnie Clayton (boxer) =

English boxer

Personal information
- Nationality: (England) English
- Born: Ronnie Clayton; 9 February 1923 Blackpool, Lancashire, England
- Died: 8 December 1999 (aged 76) Blackpool, Lancashire, England
- Weight: Featherweight

Boxing career

Boxing record
- Total fights: 114
- Wins: 80
- Win by KO: 49
- Losses: 26
- Draws: 8

Ronnie Clayton (9 February 1923 – 8 December 1999) was a British boxer, born in Blackpool, Lancashire whose career highlight was winning the British Empire and European featherweight titles in 1947.

== Boxing career ==
Clayton was born on 9 February 1923 in Lancashire, England. He and his two brothers Jackie and Syd all chose boxing as a profession.

He became a professional boxer in 1941 and was trained by his brother, Jackie at their gym in Blackpool. He was managed throughout his thirteen-year boxing career by George Dingley. He had thirteen Championship bouts that included a bantamweight championship against world champion Jackie Patterson, and non-title bouts against South African champion Vic Toweel, Jackie Turpin, Manuel Ortiz and Spider Kelly.

In the second World War, he served with the Fleet Air Arm (FAA), the English Naval Air Force, in the early 1940s but continued to box, often in Liverpool. While working with the Naval Air Force, he lost to Joe Curran on 26 August 1943, in a ten round decision in Liverpool. During his service, his most memorable match, fought for the British Empire bantamweight title was his loss to future world champion Jackie Patterson, which ended in a loss when he failed to return for the 12th round. The two boxers fought in Liverpool before a crowd of 18,000.

On 27 March 1947, he defeated Joe Carter in a fifth round knockout in Liverpool, in an important eliminator bout for the British featherweight title.

=== Three British feather titles ===
Clayton won three titles on 11 September 1947 for a purse of £2,000, by defeating Al Phillips in a fifteen round decision in Liverpool. These included the British Empire, British (British Boxing Board of Control), and European featherweight titles.

His first successful defence of his two British titles was against Johnny Molloy in a fifteen round decision in Nottingham on 11 April 1949.

He held the British Empire featherweight title for five years, until he was defeated by Roy Ankrah in a fifteen round decision in Kensington on 30 April 1951. He held the European featherweight title for only one year, losing it to French boxer Ray Famechon in a fifteen round decision in Nottingham on 22 March 1948.

On 21 April 1952, he attempted to retake the European featherweight title in Nottingham against Ray Famechon, but lost the match in a fifth round TKO.

=== Regaining British feather title ===
He regained the British featherweight title with a victory over Dai Davies in a fifth round TKO on 30 June 1952 in Abergavenny, making him the exceptional winner of two Lonsdale belts in his career.

He defended his British featherweight title on 12 May 1953 in a fourth round knockout against Freddie King in Harringay.

His fifth round loss to South African Vic Toweel, former holder of the World bantamweight title, on 12 December 1953 in Johannesburg was his only recorded bout fought outside of the United Kingdom.

In his last bout on 1 June 1954, he lost his British featherweight title to Sammy McCarthy in London's White City, quitting in the eighth round when he experienced a loss of vision that apparently ended his boxing career. McCarthy was an aspiring London boxer, eight years younger than Clayton. In an interview a few days after the fight, Clayton admitted to having had very little vision in his left eye through much of his boxing career, and announced his boxing retirement.

He died on 8 December 1999, in Blackpool, the city of his birth, and was buried there in a ceremony that included many of the leading boxers of his era.

In October 2006 the silver-gilt featherweight Lonsdale Belt won outright by Clayton in 1953 was auctioned by Bonhams as part of a sporting memorabilia sale for £2,938.

== Selected fights ==
7 Wins, 5 Losses
Result	Opponent(s)	Date	Location	Duration	Notes
Win	Joe Carter	27 Mar 1947	Liverpool	5 Round KO	Eliminator for British featherweight title (BBBofC)
Win	Al Phillips	11 Sep 1947	Liverpool	15 Rounds	Won European, Brit. Emp. and British featherweight titles
Win	Johnny Molloy	11 April 1949	Nottingham	15 Rounds	Kept European, Brit. Emp. and British featherweight titles
Win	Eddie Miller	11 Aug 1949	Liverpool	12 Round KO	Kept Brit. Emp. featherweight title
Loss	Ray Famechon	18 Nov 1949	Manchester	15 Rounds	Lost European featherweight title
Win	Al Phillips	26 Feb 1951	Nottingham	15 Rounds	Kept Brit. Emp. and British featherweight titles
Loss	Roy Ankrah	30 Apr 1951	Kensington	15 Rounds	Lost Brit. Emp. featherweight title
Loss	Roy Ankrah	25 Feb 1952	Nottingham	13th Round returned to corner	For Brit. Emp. featherweight title
Loss	Ray Famechon	21 Apr 1952	Nottingham	5th Round TKO	For European featherweight title
Win	Dai Davies	30 June 1952	Abergavenny	5th Round TKO	Regained British (BBBofC) featherweight title (2nd time)
Win	Freddie King	12 May 1953	Harringay	4 Round KO	Kept British (BBBofC) featherweight title
Loss	Sammy McCarthy	1 June 1954	White City, London	8 Rounds, Quit fight	Lost British (BBBofC) featherweight title

== See also ==
- List of British featherweight boxing champions
