= Peter Keenan (boxer) =

Scottish boxer (1928–2000)

Personal information
- Nationality: Scottish
- Born: 8 August 1928 Glasgow, Scotland
- Died: 27 July 2000 (aged 71)
- Height: 5 ft 5 1/2 in (1.66 m)
- Weight: fly/bantam/featherweight

Boxing career

Boxing record
- Total fights: 66
- Wins: 54 (KO 23)
- Losses: 11 (KO 5)
- Draws: 1
- No contests: 0

Peter Keenan (8 August 1928 — 27 July 2000) was a Scottish amateur flyweight and professional fly/bantam/featherweight boxer of the 1940s and 1950s.

As an amateur, he was runner-up in the 1948 Amateur Boxing Association of England (ABAE) light middleweight title, against Henry Carpenter (Bradfield ABC), boxing out of Anderston ABC.

As a professional, he won the British Boxing Board of Control (BBBofC) Scottish Area bantamweight title, BBBofC British bantamweight title, European Boxing Union (EBU) bantamweight title (twice), and British Empire bantamweight title. He was a challenger for the World Bantamweight Title (British Empire version) against Vic Toweel.

His professional fighting weight varied from 112 lb (51 kg; 8 st 0 lb), i.e. flyweight to 121 lb (54.9 kg; 8 st 9.0 lb), i.e. featherweight.

After his boxing career, Peter Keenan became a successful dealer in property and owned Peter Keenan's Stable Bar at 26 Lancefield Quay, Anderston and the Sportsman in Glasgow. The Stable Bar was the first in Glasgow to be granted an all-day licence in 1978.

He is commemorated with a memorial bench in Glasgow Botanic Gardens.
