= Stan Rowan =

English boxer

Personal information
- Nationality: English
- Born: Stanley J. Rowan; 31 August 1924 Liverpool, England
- Died: 1997 (aged 72)
- Weight: bantam/feather/lightweight

Boxing career

Boxing record
- Total fights: 67
- Wins: 47(KO 16)
- Losses: 15 (KO 8)
- Draws: 5

Stanley "Stan" J. Rowan (31 August 1924 – 1997 (aged 72)) born in Liverpool, was an English professional bantam/feather/lightweight boxer of the 1940s and 1950s who won the British Boxing Board of Control (BBBofC) British bantamweight title, and British Empire bantamweight title, his professional fighting weight varied from 116 3/4 lb (53.0 kg; 8 st 4.8 lb), i.e. bantamweight to 126 1/4 lb (57.3 kg; 9 st 0.3 lb), i.e. lightweight.

== Genealogical information ==
Stan Rowan was the son of Joseph P. Rowan and Sarah (née Connolly) (marriage registered during October→December 1923 in West Derby district). Stan Rowan's marriage to Annie Flynn was registered during January→March 1950 in Liverpool South district.
