= List of British featherweight boxing champions =

List of British featherweight boxing champions is a table showing the boxers who have won the British featherweight title. The title has been sanctioned by the National Sporting Club since 1909, and later by its replacement British Boxing Board of Control (BBBoC) since 1929.

A champion may retire or voluntarily relinquish the title in order to fight for a higher-ranked championship. Where the date on which a champion relinquished the title is unclear, the date of the last BBBoC sanctioned fight is shown.

^{r}–Champion relinquished title.

^{s}–Champion stripped of title.

Name	Duration of reign	Defences
Johnny Summers	1 October 1906 – 17 December 1906	0
Spike Robson	17 December 1906^{r}	0
Jim Driscoll	3 June 1907 – February 1913^{r}	4
Ted "Kid" Lewis	6 October 1913^{r}	0
Llew Edwards	31 May 1915^{r}	0
Charlie Hardcastle	4 June 1917 – 5 November 1917	1
Tancy Lee	5 November 1917 – 24 February 1919^{r}	2
Mike Honeyman	26 January 1920 – 31 October 1921	2
Joe Fox	31 October 1921^{r}	0
George McKenzie	2 June 1924 – 30 March 1925	2
Johnny Curley	30 March 1925 – 24 January 1927	3
Johnny Cuthbert	24 January 1927 – 12 March 1928	1
Harry Corbett	12 March 1928 – 18 March 1929	1
Johnny Cuthbert	18 March 1929 – 1 October 1931	4
Nel Tarleton	1 October 1931 – 10 November 1932	1
Tommy Watson	10 November 1932 – 26 July 1934	2
Nel Tarleton	26 July 1934 – 24 September 1936	3
Johnny McGrory	24 September 1936^{r}	0
Jim "Spider" Kelly	23 November 1938 – 28 June 1939	1
Nipper Johnny Cusick	28 June 1939 – 1 February 1940	1
Nel Tarleton	1 February 1940 – 23 February 1945^{r}	1
Al Phillips	18 March 1947 – 11 September 1947	2
Ronnie Clayton	11 September 1947 – 1 June 1954	6
Sammy McCarthy	1 June 1954 – 22 January 1955	1
Billy Kelly	22 January 1955 – 24 February 1956	1
Charlie Hill	24 February 1956 – 13 April 1959	3
Bobby Neill	13 April 1959 – 27 September 1960	1
Terry Spinks	27 September 1960 – 2 May 1961	2
Howard Winstone	2 May 1961 – 7 December 1966^{r}	6
Jimmy Revie	24 March 1969 – 5 July 1971	2
Evan Armstrong	5 July 1971 – 25 September 1972	2
Tommy Glencross	25 September 1972 – 17 September 1973	1
Evan Armstrong	17 September 1973 – February 1975^{r}	1
Vernon Sollas	25 March 1975 – 15 March 1977	1
Alan Richardson	15 March 1977 – 20 April 1978	2
Dave Needham	20 April 1978 – 6 November 1979	2
Pat Cowdell	6 November 1979 – April 1982^{r}	2
Steve Sims	20 September 1982 – January 1983^{r}	0
Barry McGuigan	12 April 1983 – 19 December 1984^{r}	1
Robert Dickie	9 April 1986 – 29 October 1986^{r}	2
Peter Harris	24 February 1988 – 18 May 1988^{r}	1
Paul Hodkinson	18 May 1988 – 6 September 1989^{r}	2
Sean Murphy	22 May 1990 – 5 March 1991^{r}	2
Gary De Roux	5 March 1991 – 22 May 1991	1
Colin McMillan	22 May 1991 – 29 October 1991^{r}	2
John Davison	10 September 1992^{r}	0
Sean Murphy	27 June 1993^{r}	0
Duke McKenzie	18 December 1993^{r}	0
Billy Hardy	24 May 1994^{r}	0
Mike Deveney	23 January 1995 – 20 September 1995	1
Jon Jo Irwin	20 September 1995 – 14 May 1996	2
Colin McMillan	14 May 1996 – 11 January 1997	1
Paul Ingle	11 January 1997 – 11 October 1997^{r}	2
Jon Jo Irwin	9 May 1998 – 13 February 1999	1
Scott Harrison	24 March 2001 – 17 November 2001^{r}	2
Jamie McKeever	8 February 2003 – 17 May 2003	1
Roy Rutherford	17 May 2003 – 22 November 2003	1
Dazzo Williams	22 November 2003 – 16 June 2005	4
Nicky Cook	16 June 2005^{r}	0
Andy Morris	5 November 2005 – 9 December 2006	2
John Simpson	9 December 2006 – 6 June 2008	2
Paul Appleby	6 June 2008 – 25 April 2009	2
Martin Lindsay	25 April 2009 – 15 December 2010	1
John Simpson	15 December 2010 – 27 April 2011	1
Stephen Smith	27 April 2011 – 17 September 2011	1
Lee Selby	17 September 2011 – 1 February 2014^{r}	4
Josh Warrington	21 May 2014^{r}	0
Ryan Walsh	26 September 2015 – September 2020^{s}	6
Leigh Wood	13 February 2021 – 31 July 2021^{s}	0
Nathaniel Collins	10 March 2023^{r}	2
Zak Miller	8 February 2025^{r}	0
Gully Powar	7 November 2026	0

== See also ==
- List of British heavyweight boxing champions
- List of British cruiserweight boxing champions
- List of British light-heavyweight boxing champions
- List of British super-middleweight boxing champions
- List of British middleweight boxing champions
- List of British light-middleweight boxing champions
- List of British welterweight boxing champions
- List of British light-welterweight boxing champions
- List of British lightweight boxing champions
- List of British super-featherweight boxing champions
- List of British super-bantamweight boxing champions
- List of British bantamweight boxing champions
- List of British super-flyweight boxing champions
- List of British flyweight boxing champions
- List of British world boxing champions

== Sources ==
- boxrec
- Maurice Golesworthy, Encyclopaedia of Boxing (Eighth Edition) (1988), Robert Hale Limited, ISBN 0-7090-3323-0
