= List of British world boxing champions =

This is a list of British boxers who have won a world championship by one of the four major sanctioning organisations – the World Boxing Association (WBA), World Boxing Council (WBC), International Boxing Federation (IBF) and the World Boxing Organization (WBO) – as well as those awarded by The Ring. Additionally, prior to 1962, world champions were recognised by public consensus (world), and later by the New York State Athletic Commission (NYSAC) and the National Boxing Association (NBA).

== List of champions ==
=== Heavyweight ===
No.	Name	Recognition	Date	Title defence(s)	Ref.
1	Bob Fitzsimmons	World	1897 – 1899	0	
2	Lennox Lewis	WBC	1992 – 1994	3	
3	Michael Bentt	WBO	1993 – 1994	0	
4	Herbie Hide	WBO	1994 – 1995	0	
5	Frank Bruno	WBC	1995 – 1996	0	
6	Henry Akinwande	WBO	1996 – 1997	2	
7	Lennox Lewis (2)	WBA, WBC, IBF	1997 – 2001	9	
8	Herbie Hide (2)	WBO	1997 – 1999	2	
9	Lennox Lewis (3)	WBC, IBF, The Ring	2001 – 2003	2	
10	David Haye	WBA	2009 – 2011	2	
11	Tyson Fury	WBA, IBF, WBO, The Ring	2015 – 2018	0	
12	Anthony Joshua	WBA, IBF, WBO	2016 – 2019	6	
13	Anthony Joshua (2)	WBA, IBF, WBO	2019 – 2021	1	
14	Tyson Fury (2)	WBC, The Ring	2020 – 2024	3	
15	Daniel Dubois	IBF	2024 – 2025	1	
16	Fabio Wardley	WBO	2025 – 2026	0	
17	Daniel Dubois (2)	WBO	2026 – present	1	

=== Cruiserweight ===
No.	Name	Recognition	Date	Title defence(s)	Ref.
1	Glenn McCrory	IBF	1989 – 1990	1	
2	Carl Thompson	WBO	1997 – 1999	2	
3	Johnny Nelson	WBO	1999 – 2006	13	
4	Enzo Maccarinelli	WBO	2006 – 2008	4	
5	David Haye	WBA, WBC, WBO, The Ring	2007 – 2008	1	
6	Tony Bellew	WBC	2016	1	
7	Lawrence Okolie	WBO	2021 – 2023	3	
8	Chris Billiam-Smith	WBO	2023 – 2024	2	

=== Light-heavyweight ===
No.	Name	Recognition	Date	Title defence(s)	Ref.
1	Bob Fitzsimmons	World	1903 – 1905	0	
2	Freddie Mills	NYSAC, NBA, The Ring	1948 – 1950	0	
3	John Conteh	WBC	1974 – 1977	3	
4	Dennis Andries	WBC	1986 – 1987	1	
5	Dennis Andries (2)	WBC	1989	0	
6	Dennis Andries (3)	WBC	1990 – 1991	2	
7	Clinton Woods	IBF	2005 – 2007	7	
8	Joe Calzaghe	The Ring	2008 – 2009	1	
9	Nathan Cleverly	WBO	2011 – 2013	5	
10	Nathan Cleverly (2)	WBA	2016 – 2017	0	
11	Willy Hutchinson	WBC	2026 – present	0	

=== Super-middleweight ===
No.	Name	Recognition	Date	Title defence(s)	Ref.
1	Murray Sutherland	IBF	1984	0	
3	Chris Eubank	WBO	1991 – 1995	14	
4	Nigel Benn	WBC	1992 – 1996	9	
5	Robin Reid	WBC	1996 – 1997	3	
6	Joe Calzaghe	WBA, WBC, IBF, WBO, The Ring	1997 – 2008	21	
7	Richie Woodhall	WBC	1998 – 1999	2	
8	Glenn Catley	WBC	2000	0	
9	Carl Froch	WBC	2008 – 2010	2	
10	Carl Froch (2)	WBC	2010 – 2011	1	
11	Brian Magee	WBA	2012	0	
12	Carl Froch (3)	WBA, IBF	2012 – 2014	4	
13	James DeGale	IBF	2015 – 2017	3	
14	George Groves	WBA	2017 – 2018	2	
15	Rocky Fielding	WBA	2018	0	
16	James DeGale (2)	IBF	2018	0	
17	Callum Smith	WBA, The Ring	2018 – 2020	3	
18	Billy Joe Saunders	WBO	2019 – 2021	2	
19	Hamzah Sheeraz	WBO	2026	1	

=== Middleweight ===
No.	Name	Recognition	Date	Title defence(s)	Ref.
1	Bob Fitzsimmons	World	1891 – 1894	2	
2	Randy Turpin	NYSAC, NBA, The Ring	1951	0	
3	Terry Downes	NYSAC, The Ring	1961	0	
4	Alan Minter	WBA, WBC, The Ring	1980	1	
5	Nigel Benn	WBO	1990	1	
6	Chris Eubank	WBO	1990 – 1991	3	
7	Chris Pyatt	WBO	1993 – 1994	2	
8	Jason Matthews	WBO	1999	0	
9	Darren Barker	IBF	2013	0	
10	Billy Joe Saunders	WBO	2015 – 2018	3	
11	Denzel Bentley	WBO	2026	0	

=== Light-middleweight ===
No.	Name	Recognition	Date	Title defence(s)	Ref.
1	Maurice Hope	WBC	1979 – 1981	3	
2	Paul Jones	WBO	1995 – 1996	0	
3	Liam Smith	WBO	2015 – 2016	2	
4	Josh Kelly	IBF	2026 – present	1	

=== Welterweight ===
No.	Name	Recognition	Date	Title defence(s)	Ref.
1	Matt Wells	World	1914 – 1915	0	
2	John H. Stracey	WBC, The Ring	1975 – 1976	1	
3	Lloyd Honeyghan	WBC, IBF, The Ring	1986 – 1987	3	
4	Lloyd Honeyghan (2)	WBC, The Ring	1988 – 1989	1	
5	Ricky Hatton	WBA	2006	0	
6	Kell Brook	IBF	2014 – 2017	3	
7	Lewis Crocker	IBF	2025 – 2026	0	

=== Light-welterweight ===
No.	Name	Recognition	Date	Title defence(s)	Ref.
1	Jack Kid Berg	NBA, The Ring	1930 – 1931	14	
2	Terry Marsh	IBF	1987	1	
3	Ricky Hatton	WBA, IBF, The Ring	2005 – 2009	5	
4	Junior Witter	WBC	2006 – 2008	2	
5	Gavin Rees	WBA	2007 – 2008	0	
6	Amir Khan	WBA, IBF	2009 – 2011	5	
7	Ricky Burns	WBA	2016 – 2017	1	
8	Josh Taylor	WBA, WBC, IBF, WBO, The Ring	2019 – 2023	3	
9	Dalton Smith	WBC	2026 – present	1	

=== Lightweight ===
No.	Name	Recognition	Date	Title defence(s)	Ref.
1	Freddie Welsh	World	1914 – 1917	–	
2	Ken Buchanan	WBA, WBC, The Ring, NYSAC	1970 – 1972	2	
3	Jim Watt	WBC, The Ring	1979 – 1981	4	
4	Ricky Burns	WBO	2012 – 2014	4	
5	Anthony Crolla	WBA	2016 – 2017	1	
6	Terry Flanagan	WBO	2015 – 2017	5	

=== Super-featherweight ===
No.	Name	Recognition	Date	Title defence(s)	Ref.
1	Barry Jones	WBO	1997	0	
2	Alex Arthur	WBO	2008	0	
3	Nicky Cook	WBO	2008 – 2009	0	
4	Ricky Burns	WBO	2011 – 2012	2	
5	Joe Cordina	IBF	2022	0	
6	Joe Cordina (2)	IBF	2023 – 2024	1	
7	Anthony Cacace	IBF	2024 – 2025	0	
8	Jazza Dickens	WBA	2025 – 2026	0	
9	Anthony Cacace (2)	WBA	2026 – present	0	

=== Featherweight ===
No.	Name	Recognition	Date	Title defence(s)	Ref.
1	Ben Jordan	World	1899	–	
2	Howard Winstone	WBC	1968	0	
3	Paul Hodgkinson	WBC	1991 – 1993	3	
4	Colin McMillan	WBO	1992	0	
5	Steve Robinson	IBF	1993 – 1995	7	
6	Naseem Hamed	WBC, IBF, WBO	1995 – 2000	15	
7	Paul Ingle	IBF	1999 – 2000	1	
8	Scott Harrison	WBO	2002 – 2003	1	
9	Scott Harrison (2)	WBO	2003 – 2005	6	
10	Lee Selby	IBF	2015 – 2018	4	
11	Carl Frampton	WBA	2016 – 2017	0	
12	Josh Warrington	IBF	2018 – 2021	3	
13	Leigh Wood	WBA	2021 – 2023	1	
14	Josh Warrington (2)	IBF	2022	0	
15	Leigh Wood (2)	WBA	2023	1	
16	Nick Ball	WBA	2024 – 2026	3	

=== Super-bantamweight ===
No.	Name	Recognition	Date	Title defence(s)	Ref.
1	Duke McKenzie	WBO	1992 – 1993	0	
2	Scott Quigg	WBA	2013 – 2016	6	
3	Carl Frampton	WBA, IBF	2014 – 2016	3	
4	Isaac Dogboe	WBO	2018	1	

=== Bantamweight ===
No.	Name	Recognition	Date	Title defence(s)	Ref.
1	Joe Bowker	World	1904 – 1905	1	
2	Duke McKenzie	WBO	1991 – 1992	2	
3	Robbie Regan	WBO	1996	0	
4	Jamie McDonnell	IBF	2013	0	
5	Stuart Hall	IBF	2013 – 2014	1	
6	Paul Butler	IBF	2014	0	
7	Jamie McDonnell (2)	WBA	2014 – 2018	6	
8	Lee Haskins	IBF	2015 – 2017	2	
9	Ryan Burnett	WBA, IBF	2017 – 2018	2	
10	Paul Butler (2)	WBO	2022	0	

=== Super-flyweight ===
No.	Name	Recognition	Date	Title defence(s)	Ref.
1	Kal Yafai	WBA	2016 – 2020	4	

=== Flyweight ===
No.	Name	Recognition	Date	Title defence(s)	Ref.
1	Sid Smith	World	1911 – 1913	1	
2	Bill Ladbury	World	1913 – 1914	1	
3	Percy Jones	World	1914	1	
4	Tancy Lee	World	1915	–	
5	Joe Symonds	World	1915 – 1916	–	
6	Jimmy Wilde	World	1916 – 1923	–	
7	Jackie Brown	World, NBA	1932 – 1935	3	
8	Benny Lynch	World, NBA, NYSAC, The Ring	1935 – 1938	3	
9	Peter Kane	World, NBA, The Ring	1938 – 1943	2	
10	Jackie Paterson	World, NBA, The Ring	1943 – 1948	1	
11	Rinty Monaghan	NBA	1948 – 1950	3	
12	Terry Allen	NBA, The Ring	1950	0	
13	Walter McGowan	The Ring	1966	0	
14	Charlie Magri	WBC	1983	0	
15	Duke McKenzie	IBF	1988 – 1989	1	
16	Dave McAuley	IBF	1989 – 1992	5	
17	Pat Clinton	WBO	1992 – 1993	1	
18	Charlie Edwards	WBC	2018 – 2019	2	
19	Sunny Edwards	IBF	2021 – 2023	4	

=== Light-flyweight ===
No.	Name	Recognition	Date	Title defence(s)	Ref.
1	Paul Weir	WBO	1994 – 1995	1	

=== Mini-flyweight ===
No.	Name	Recognition	Date	Title defence(s)	Ref.
1	Paul Weir	WBO	1993	1	

== See also ==
- List of WBA world champions
- List of WBC world champions
- List of IBF world champions
- List of WBO world champions
- List of The Ring champions
