= Tommy Noble =

British boxer

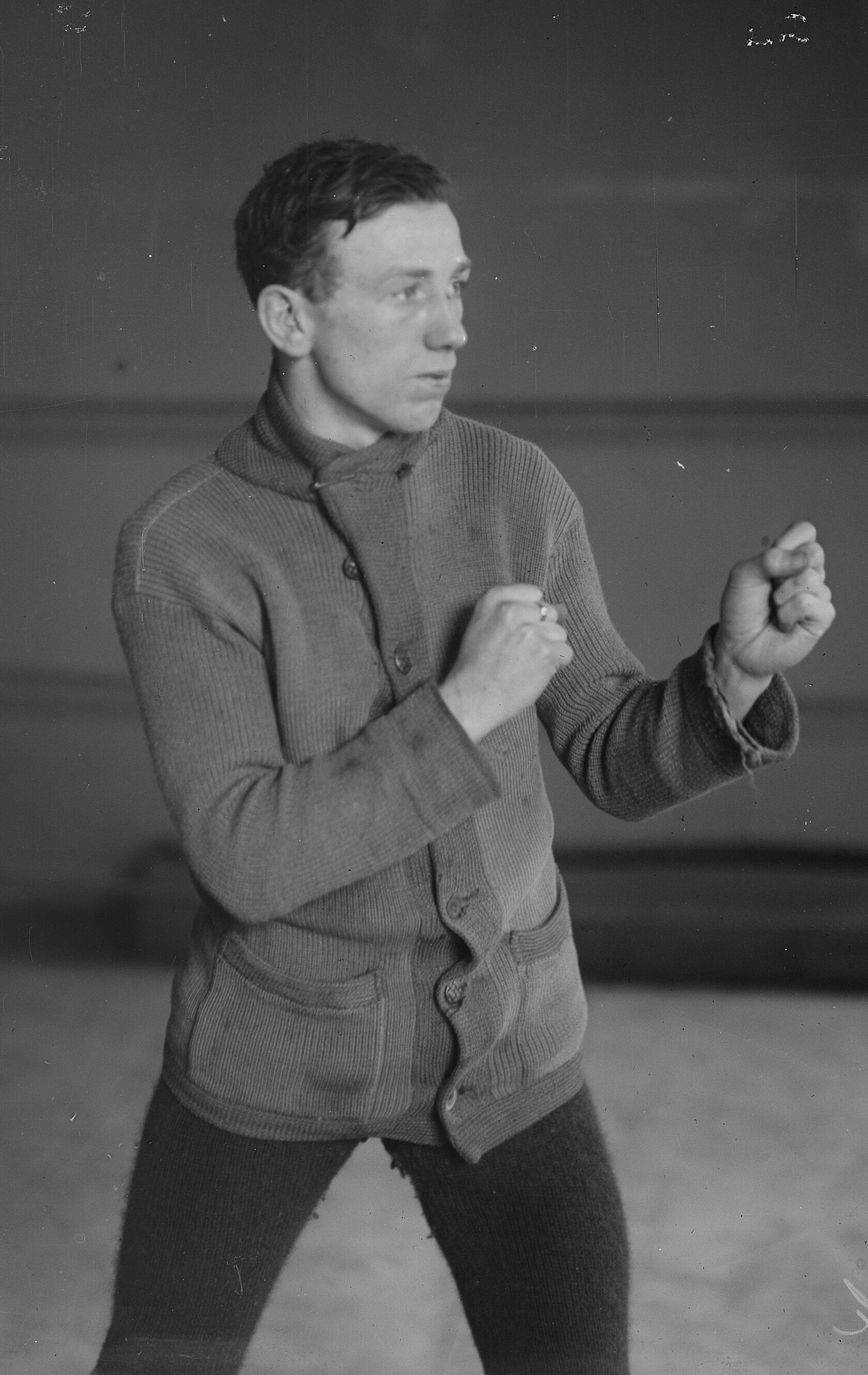
- TommyNoble

Personal information
- Nationality: British
- Born: 4 March 1897
- Died: 1 April 1966 (aged 69)
- Height: 5 ft 5 in (165 cm)
- Weight: Bantamweight, featherweight

Boxing career

Boxing record
- Total fights: 181
- Wins: 81
- Win by KO: 25
- Losses: 66
- Draws: 17
- No contests: 15 (several no/unknown decision)

Tommy Noble (4 March 1897 – 1 April 1966) was a British boxer who was British bantamweight champion between 1918 and 1919, and European champion in 1919. He won the World featherweight title in 1920.

== Career ==
Noble enlisted into the British Army when World War I broke out, but was discharged as medically unfit in January 1915. He made his professional debut in February 1915 with a win over Jim Welsh. He fought 29 times in 1915, winning 23. His first fight of 1916 was a loss to Jimmy Wilde, and he was also beaten in April, and again in July, by Joe Symonds. He had a run of success later in the year, beating Bill Ladbury twice, before five straight defeats to Johnny Hughes, Digger Stanley, Joe Fox, Wilde, and Tancy Lee. He beat Hughes on points in November.

In 1917 he was called up under the Derby Scheme and served as a private in the Army Service Corps until being medically discharged again in November 1918.

In 1917 he beat Sid Smith, Nat Brooks, and Freddie Jacks, but lost to Mike Honeyman, Louis Ruddick (twice), and Joe Conn. A good run in the latter half of 1918, including a win over Curley Walker despite being a stone lighter, led to his meeting Symonds in November at the National Sporting Club, for the British bantamweight title vacated by Fox. The fight went the full 20 rounds, with Noble taking the decision to become British champion.

In April 1919 Noble successfully challenged for Eugène Criqui's European title at the Holborn Stadium, stopping the defending champion in the 19th round. He defended the title two months later against Criqui, the fight ending in a draw. Only three days after the Criqui fight, Noble lost the British title, retiring in the tenth round against Walter Ross. A month later he faced former European champion Charles Ledoux in Paris, losing the European title via a tenth-round knockout, with Noble protesting that he had got up before the count ended.

Noble spent most of 1920 fighting in the United States and Canada, where he faced Georges Papin, Jacks, and Al Shubert among over a dozen contests, most notably a win over Johnny Murray at Madison Square Garden in October that saw him win the World featherweight belt.

He spent 1921 fighting in Australia, with little success apart from a win over Victorian champion Bert Spargo.

Between 1922 and 1926 he had a second spell in the US and Canada, losing most of his fights. On his return to England he lost his first three fights, to Johnny Curley and twice to Battling van Dijk, and retired from the ring. He returned in 1930, beating a handful of inexperienced boxers, before retiring for good in 1932, although he later boxed in exhibition bouts. His career earnings from boxing were stated at £100,000.

He went on to market his own brand of bath oils which he sold by mail order, and worked as a street trader. In 1940 he was awarded £200 damages against the Daily Sketch and Sunday Graphic Ltd. after an article published in the Daily Sketch wrongly suggested that Noble should have served at the front during the war and may have bribed his superiors to be allowed to box.
