= List of British flyweight boxing champions =

List of British flyweight boxing champions is a table showing the boxers who have won the British flyweight title. The title has been sanctioned by the National Sporting Club since 1909, and later by its replacement British Boxing Board of Control (BBBoC) since 1929.

A champion may retire or voluntarily relinquish the title in order to fight for a higher-ranked championship. Where the date on which a champion relinquished the title is unclear, the date of the last BBBoC sanctioned fight is shown.

^{r}–Champion relinquished title.

^{s}–Champion stripped of title.

Name	Duration of reign	Defences
Sid Smith	4 December 1911 – 2 June 1913	2
Bill Ladbury	2 June 1913 – 26 January 1914	1
Percy Jones	26 January 1914^{r}	0
Tancy Lee	25 January 1915 – 18 October 1915	1
Joe Symonds	18 October 1915 – 14 February 1916	1
Jimmy Wilde	14 February 1916 – 29 April 1918^{r1923}	4
Elky Clark	31 March 1924 – 7 April 1927^{s}	1
Johnny Hill	30 May 1927 – 27 September 1929 (died)	2
Jackie Brown	13 October 1929 – 3 March 1930	1
Bert Kirby	3 March 1930 – 6 January 1931^{s}	0
Jackie Brown	2 February 1931 – 9 September 1935	3
Benny Lynch	9 September 1935 – 13 October 1937^{r1938}	2
Jackie Paterson	30 September 1939 – 23 March 1948	4
Rinty Monaghan	23 March 1948 – 30 September 1949^{r}	1
Terry Allen	11 June 1951 – 17 March 1952	1
Teddy Gardner	17 March 1952 – September 1952^{r}	0
Terry Allen	21 October 1952 – 16 February 1954^{r}	1
Dai Dower	28 February 1955^{r1957}	0
Frankie Jones	31 July 1957 – 8 October 1960	2
Johnny Caldwell	8 October 1960^{r1961}	0
Jackie Brown	27 February 1962 – 2 May 1963	1
Walter McGowan	2 May 1963 – November 1966^{r}	0
John McCluskey	16 January 1967 – September 1977^{r}	2
Charlie Magri	6 December 1977 – August 1981^{r}	0
Kelvin Smart	14 September 1982 – 25 January 1984	1
Hugh Russell	25 January 1984 — April 1985^{r}	2
Duke McKenzie	5 June 1985 – August 1986^{r}	1
Dave McAuley	20 October 1986^{r1987}	0
Pat Clinton	9 March 1988 – 19 December 1989^{r1991}	2
Robbie Regan	28 May 1991 – 3 September 1991	1
Francis Ampofo	3 September 1991 – 17 December 1991	1
Robbie Regan	17 December 1991 – 19 May 1992^{r}	1
Francis Ampofo	12 December 1992 – 20 December 1994^{r1995}	2
Mickey Cantwell	21 March 1996^{r}	0
Ady Lewis	27 January 1997 – 11 September 1997^{r1998}	2
Damaen Kelly	13 March 1999 – 22 May 1999	1
Keith Knox	22 May 1999 – 16 October 1999	1
Jason Booth	16 October 2002 – 13 November 2003	1
Chris Edwards	23 January 2009 – 23 October 2009	2
Shinny Bayaar	23 October 2009 – 15 December 2010	1
Paul Edwards	15 December 2010 – 11 June 2011	0
Chris Edwards	11 June 2011 – 13 October 2012	2
Kevin Satchell	13 October 2012 – 6 July 2013^{r}	2
Andrew Selby	14 May 2016 – 15 November 2019^{r}	0
Tommy Frank	18 September 2021 - 5 May 2023	1
Jay Harris	5 May 2023 - 31 May 2024^{r}	1
Sean Bruce	28 February 2026 - 3 October 2026	0
Hamza Uddin	3 October 2026- present	0

== See also ==
- List of British heavyweight boxing champions
- List of British cruiserweight boxing champions
- List of British light-heavyweight boxing champions
- List of British super-middleweight boxing champions
- List of British middleweight boxing champions
- List of British light-middleweight boxing champions
- List of British welterweight boxing champions
- List of British light-welterweight boxing champions
- List of British lightweight boxing champions
- List of British super-featherweight boxing champions
- List of British featherweight boxing champions
- List of British super-bantamweight boxing champions
- List of British bantamweight boxing champions
- List of British super-flyweight boxing champions
- List of British world boxing champions

== Sources ==
- boxrec
- Maurice Golesworthy, Encyclopaedia of Boxing (Eighth Edition) (1988), Robert Hale Limited, ISBN 0-7090-3323-0
