= Cocksedge =

Cocksedge is a surname. Notable people with the surname include:

- A. G. Cocksedge (1892–1973), British gymnast
- Albert Cocksedge (1884–1928), British boxer
- Kendra Cocksedge (born 1988), New Zealand rugby union player and cricketer
