= Jim Kelly (boxer) =

Irish boxer

Jim "Spider" Kelly
Personal information
- Nickname: Spider
- Nationality: Irish
- Born: 25 February 1912 Derry, Northern Ireland
- Weight: feather/light/welter/middleweight

Boxing career

Boxing record
- Total fights: 168
- Wins: 120 (KO 26)
- Losses: 35 (KO 14)
- Draws: 12
- No contests: 1

Jim "Spider" Kelly (25 February 1912 – death unknown) born in Derry was an Irish professional feather/light/welter/middleweight boxer of the 1920s, 1930s and 1940s who won the Irish flyweight title, British Boxing Board of Control (BBBofC) Northern Ireland Area featherweight title, BBBofC British featherweight title, and British Empire featherweight title, his professional fighting weight varied from 125 3/4 lb (57.0 kg; 8 st 13.8 lb), i.e. Featherweight to 148 1/2 lb (67.4 kg; 10 st 8.5 lb), i.e. Middleweight.
