= Johnny McGrory =

Scottish boxer

Personal information
- Nationality: Scottish
- Born: 25 April 1915 Glasgow, Scotland
- Died: 25 September 1998 (aged 83)
- Weight: feather/light/welterweight

Boxing career

Boxing record
- Total fights: 108
- Wins: 75 (KO 16)
- Losses: 25 (KO 11)
- Draws: 8

Johnny McGrory (25 April 1915 in Glasgow – 25 September 1998) was a Scottish professional feather/light/welterweight boxer of the 1930s and 1940s who won the British Boxing Board of Control (BBBofC) Scottish Area featherweight title, BBBofC British featherweight title, and British Empire featherweight title, his professional fighting weight varied from 125 lb (57 kg; 8 st 13 lb), i.e. Featherweight to 140 lb (64 kg; 10 st 0 lb), i.e. welterweight.
