= Arthur Wyns =

Belgian boxer

Arthur Wyns (born 1 March 1893-19??) was a Belgian boxer, who was the only EBU Featherweight boxer to defend his championship twice, until his record was broken in 1922. His bouts were international news in the 1920s.

== Boxing career ==
Wyns had a professional boxing career stretching from 1911 to 1926 that had about 115 bouts, of which included 79 wins by KO, 23 losses, and 13 ending in decisions for draws.

On 31 May 1920 in London, England, Wyns won the vacant European featherweight title, after a technical knock out of Mike Honeyman in the tenth round; he had knocked down his opponent five times before the referee showed mercy to Honeyman.

Eugène Criqui trained with, and fought, Wyns in several International bouts on a tour of Australia via the Suez Canal. In late 1920, he was involved in a controversial bout in which a referee assisted a boxer, who he'd knocked out, back into the ring. He was defeated by future hall of famer Sid Godfrey, in a fight on Boxing Day, 26 December 26 1920.

He successfully defended his European title twice between 1920 and 1922, and held the EBU title until 12 June 1922, when he was defeated by Billy Matthews. He attempted to re-gain his title, but was defeated by his former sparring partner Criqui on 9 September of that same year.

After a bout on 6 October 1926, when he was defeated by Auguste Gyde at the Palais des Sports in his hometown of Brussels, he retired from the sport of boxing.

Wyn died some time after 1926.

Achievements
Preceded by Louis de Ponthieu	European Featherweught Champion; 31 May 1920 – 12 June 1922	Succeeded by Billy Matthews
