= Charlie Hardcastle =

English boxer (1894–1960)

Personal information
- Nickname: The Barnsley Bombshell
- Nationality: British
- Born: 1894 Worsbrough Bridge, Yorkshire, England
- Died: 17 February 1960 (aged 66)

Boxing career

Boxing record
- Total fights: 78
- Wins: 46
- Win by KO: 35
- Losses: 27
- Draws: 4

Charlie Hardcastle (1894–1960) was an English boxer who was British featherweight champion in 1917.

== Career ==
Born in Worsbrough Bridge near Barnsley, Hardcastle made his professional debut at 8st 6lbs in May 1911, losing to Billy Green. He had seven further fights that year, winning them all inside the distance, and became known as 'The Barnsley Bombshell'.

In February 1912 he suffered the second defeat of his career, losing on points to Young Hazlehurst. His next fight came two months later against Louis Ruddick for the Yorkshire flyweight title, Hardcastle retiring with a hand injury in the second round of twenty. Over the next three years he won most of his fights, mainly against novice boxers, and in December 1914 avenged his earlier defeat to Green to win the Pitmen's featherweight title.

Hardcastle moved up in class in 1915, knocking out Mike Honeyman in two rounds in March. He lost on points over 20 rounds to the experienced Young Joe Brooks in April, and in June beat Walter Rossi, his opponent disqualified in the first round. In November he drew with Freddie Jacks.

In June 1916, Hardcastle faced debutante Louis Hood at the National Sporting Club. The fight went to the fourteenth round, in which Hardcastle knocked Hood down; Hood got to his feet at the end of the count but collapsed and fell unconscious, and died shortly before two o'clock the following morning. Hardcastle, along with the referee, timekeeper, the two seconds, and the manager of the NSC, was charged with manslaughter, but the charges were dismissed the following month and the fatality was later ruled death by misadventure.

In July 1916 Hardcastle beat Young Joe Brooks on points and in October beat Honeyman for a second time, stopping him in the fifth round. His last fight of the year was a points loss to former British bantamweight champion Curley Walker.

Hardcastle started 1917 with a points loss to former English champion Seaman Arthur Hayes in January. After Llew Edwards vacated, Hardcastle faced former amateur champion Alf Wye in June for the British featherweight title. Hardcastle knocked Wye out in 2 minutes and 22 seconds of the first round to become British champion. He successfully defended his British title in July against Ruddick, who was disqualified in the 15th round after hitting Hardcastle while he was down, and in November made a second defence against Tancy Lee. Lee Knocked him out in the fourth round to take the title.

Over the next two years, Hardcastle fought with mixed results, but never again challenged for a title. He continued until 1923 but lost nine of his last eleven fights, his only wins in that period coming against the inexperienced Tommy Gray.
