= Eugène Criqui =

French boxer (1893–1977)

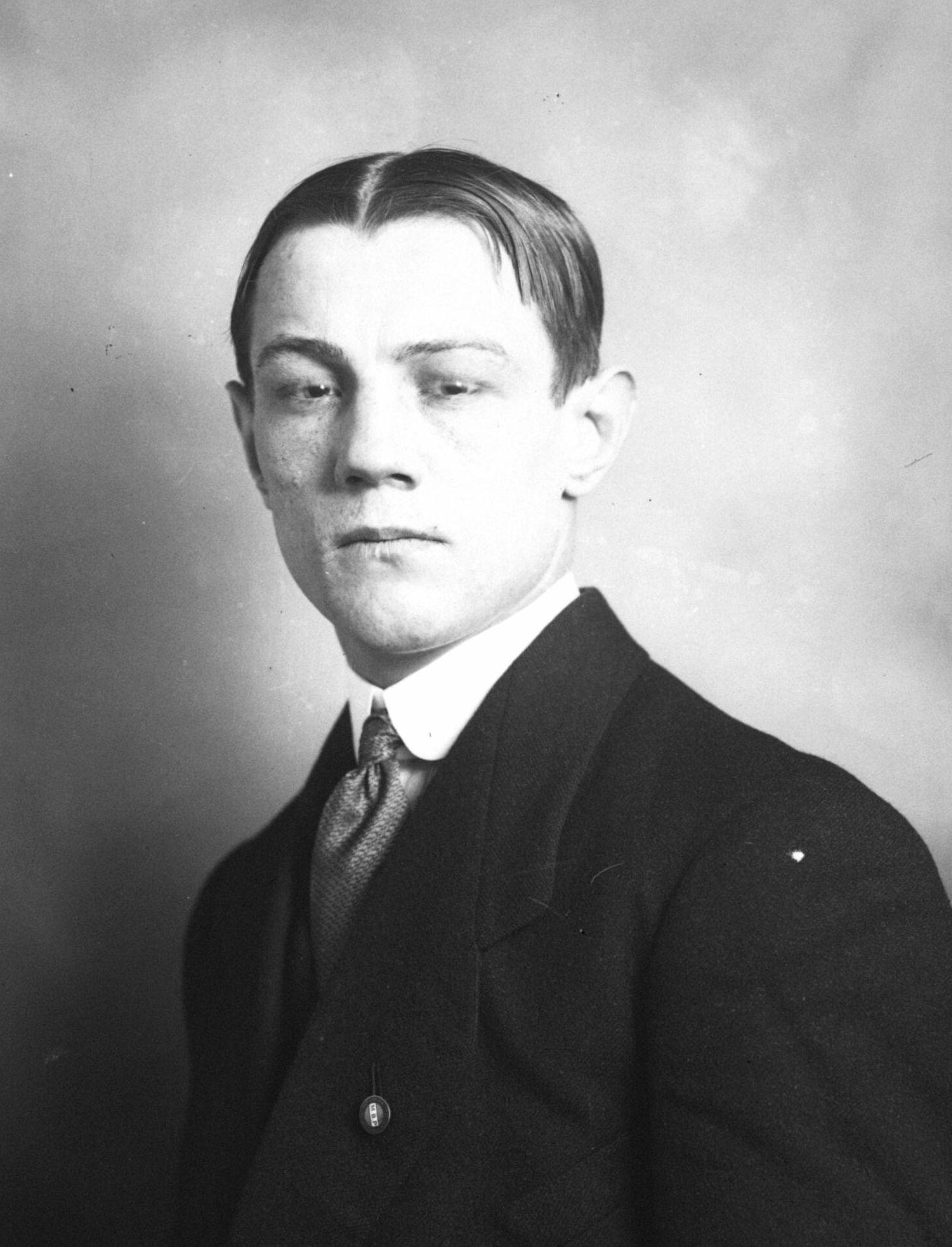

Personal information
- Nickname: Mâchoire de fer (Iron Jaw)
- Born: Eugène Criqui; 15 August 1893 Paris, France
- Died: 7 July 1977 (aged 83) Noisy-le-Grand, France
- Weight: Featherweight

Boxing career
- Stance: Orthodox

Boxing record
- Total fights: 135
- Wins: 104
- Win by KO: 58
- Losses: 16
- Draws: 15

Eugène Criqui (15 August 1893 – 7 July 1977) was a French boxer who held the World Featherweight title in 1923. After his death, he was added to the International Boxing Hall of Fame.

Eugène was the 2015 Inductee for the Australian National Boxing Hall of Fame International category.

== Boxing career ==
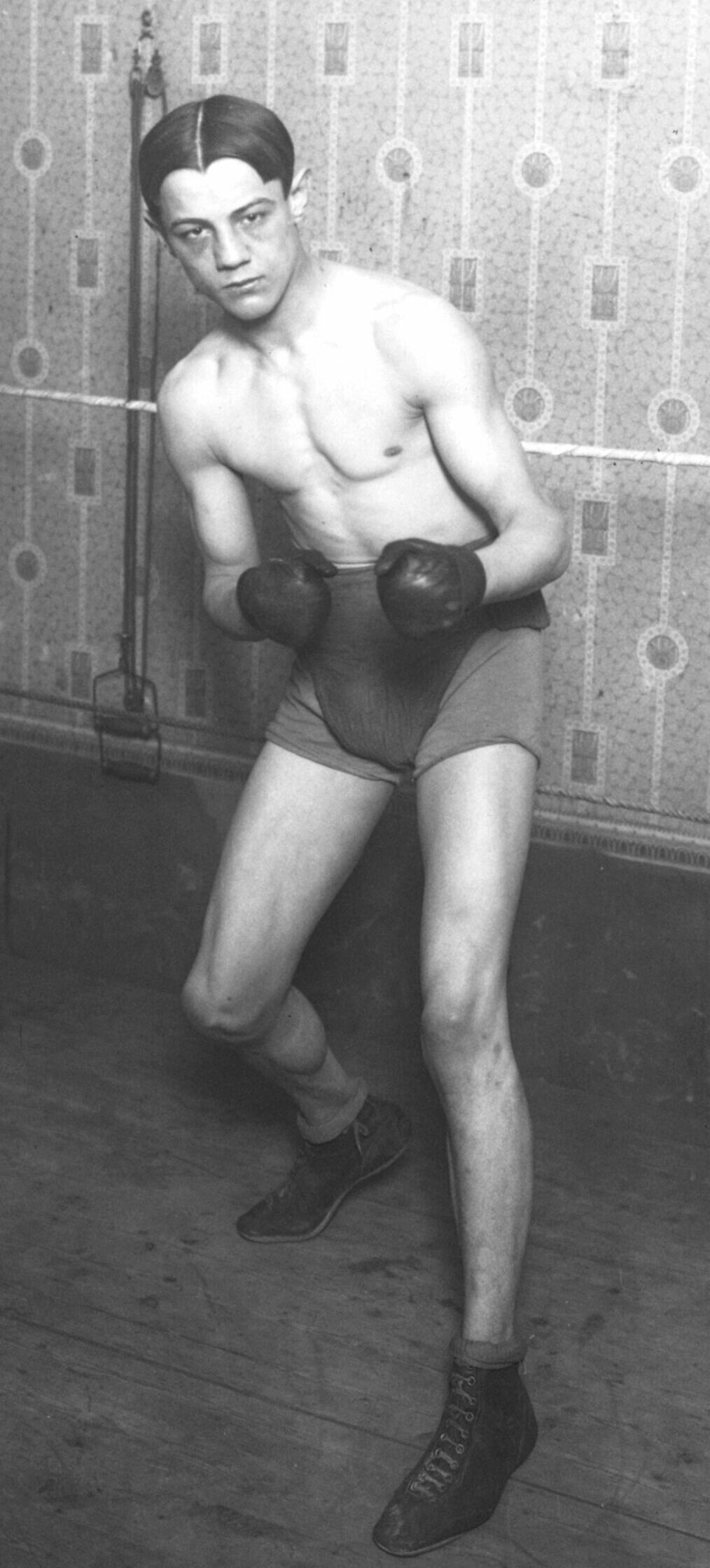
Criqui in fighting pose

=== Early career and military service ===
Criqui was born in the Belleville neighbourhood of Paris. He was a professional pipe-fitter before he turned professional in 1910. He won the French flyweight title in 1912. His boxing career was interrupted when he served in the French military in World War I. While doing guard duty at Verdun, his jaw was shattered by a sniper's bullet. A surgeon reconstructed the jaw using wire, silver, and a goat leg.

=== World featherweight champion ===
After the war he resumed boxing. He won the French featherweight title in 1921 and the next year won the European Boxing Union featherweight championship. On 2 June 1923 he beat Johnny Kilbane by a sixth-round knockout in New York City to win the world featherweight title. Part of the contract for this fight required that he give Johnny Dundee a shot at the title within sixty days. When he fought Dundee fifty-four days later (on 26 July 1923) Dundee knocked him down four times and beat him by a fifteen-round decision. In his next fight, Criqui injured his hand and did not fight many more fights before he retired in 1928.

== Death ==
He died blind in a nursing home in 1977. He was inducted into the International Boxing Hall of Fame in 2005, making him the third inductee from France after Georges Carpentier and Marcel Cerdan.

== Professional boxing record ==
135 fights	104 wins	16 losses
By knockout	58	5
By decision	44	10
By disqualification	2	1
Draws	15	

No.	Result	Record	Opponent	Type	Round	Date	Location	Notes
135	Win	104–16–15	Benny Carter	PTS	10	Mar 19, 1928	Cirque de Paris, Paris, France	
134	Loss	103–16–15	Gustave Humery	TKO	6 (12)	Dec 20, 1927	Cirque de Paris, Paris, France	For France featherweight title
133	Loss	103–15–15	Panama Al Brown	UD	10	Apr 2, 1927	Velodrome d'Hiver, Paris, France	
132	Loss	103–14–15	Carlos Uzabeaga	PTS	10	Oct 6, 1926	Buenos Aires, Distrito Federal, Argentina	
131	Loss	103–13–15	Danny Frush	KO	8 (15)	Jun 1, 1924	Stade Buffalo, Montrouge, Hauts-de-Seine, France	
130	Win	103–12–15	Henri Hébrans	PTS	15	Oct 6, 1923	Velodrome d'Hiver, Paris, France	
129	Loss	102–12–15	Johnny Dundee	PTS	15	Jul 26, 1923	Polo Grounds, New York City, New York, U.S.	Lost NYSAC featherweight title
128	Win	102–11–15	Johnny Kilbane	TKO	6 (15)	Jun 2, 1923	Polo Grounds, New York City, New York, U.S.	Won NYSAC featherweight title
127	Win	101–11–15	Billy Matthews	RTD	17 (20)	Dec 2, 1922	Velodrome d'Hiver, Paris, France	
126	Win	100–11–15	Ben Callicott	KO	2 (15)	Nov 18, 1922	Liege, Belgium	
125	Win	99–11–15	Walter Rossi	KO	1 (20)	Nov 4, 1922	Velodrome d'Hiver, Paris, France	Retained IBU featherweight title
124	Win	98–11–15	Arthur Wyns	RTD	6 (20)	Sep 9, 1922	Velodrome d'Hiver, Paris, France	Retained IBU featherweight title
123	Win	97–11–15	Arthur Wyns	KO	12 (20)	Jul 7, 1922	Cirque de Paris, Paris, France	Won IBU featherweight title
122	Win	96–11–15	Tom Anderson	KO	1 (?)	Jun 25, 1922	Casino de la Plage, Marseille, Bouches-du-Rhône, France	
121	Win	95–11–15	Joseph Youyou	KO	3 (10)	Jun 16, 1922	Frontón Condal, Barcelona, Cataluña, Spain	
120	Win	94–11–15	Joe Fox	TKO	12 (20)	May 29, 1922	Holland Park Rink, Kensington, London, England	
119	Win	93–11–15	Ben Callicott	KO	3 (15)	Apr 11, 1922	Cirque de Paris, Paris, France	
118	Win	92–11–15	Charles Ledoux	KO	1 (15)	Feb 5, 1922	Velodrome d'Hiver, Paris, France	
117	Win	91–11–15	Georges Gaillard	TKO	5 (20)	Dec 6, 1921	Cirque de Paris, Paris, France	Retained France featherweight title
116	Win	90–11–15	Alfons Spaniers	KO	2 (15)	Oct 25, 1921	Cirque de Paris, Paris, France	
115	Win	89–11–15	Auguste Grassi	KO	1 (15)	Sep 27, 1921	Cirque de Paris, Paris, France	Won vacant France featherweight title
114	Win	88–11–15	Dencio Cabanela	KO	14 (20)	Mar 19, 1921	Sydney Stadium, Sydney, New South Wales, Australia	
113	Win	87–11–15	Silvino Jamito	PTS	20	Feb 19, 1921	Sydney Stadium, Sydney, New South Wales, Australia	
112	Win	86–11–15	Sid Godfrey	KO	10 (20)	Feb 5, 1921	Sydney Stadium, Sydney, New South Wales, Australia	
111	Win	85–11–15	Jerry Sullivan	RTD	13 (20)	Jan 8, 1921	Sydney Stadium, Sydney, New South Wales, Australia	
110	Win	84–11–15	Bert Spargo	KO	16 (20)	Dec 18, 1920	Sydney Stadium, Sydney, New South Wales, Australia	
109	Win	83–11–15	Jackie Green	KO	4 (20)	Nov 20, 1920	Sydney Stadium, Sydney, New South Wales, Australia	
108	Win	82–11–15	Vince Blackburn	RTD	10 (20)	Oct 23, 1920	Sydney Stadium, Sydney, New South Wales, Australia	
107	Win	81–11–15	Young Baker	KO	1 (15)	Jun 26, 1920	Cirque de Paris, Paris, France	
106	Win	80–11–15	Joe Mendell	KO	12 (12)	Apr 17, 1920	Cirque de Paris, Paris, France	
105	Loss	79–11–15	Memphis Pal Moore	TKO	14 (20)	Dec 26, 1919	Royal Albert Hall, Kensington, London, England	
104	Win	79–10–15	Sam Kellar	TKO	5 (20)	Oct 29, 1919	Salle Wagram, Paris, France	
103	Win	78–10–15	Walter Young Ross	KO	15 (20)	Sep 18, 1919	Holborn Stadium, Holborn, London, England	
102	Win	77–10–15	Digger Evans	KO	7 (20)	Jul 18, 1919	Nouveau Cirque, Paris, France	
101	Draw	76–10–15	Tommy Noble	PTS	20	Jun 27, 1919	Nouveau Cirque, Paris, France	
100	Win	76–10–14	Auguste Grassi	TKO	8 (?)	Jun 3, 1919	Casablanca, Morocco	
99	Win	75–10–14	Leon Poutet	TKO	6 (?)	May 25, 1919	Casino de la Plage, Marseille, Bouches-du-Rhône, France	
98	Loss	74–10–14	Tommy Noble	KO	19 (20)	Apr 10, 1919	Holborn Stadium, Holborn, London, England	For IBU bantamweight title
97	Win	74–9–14	Steve Sullivan	KO	1 (10)	Feb 6, 1919	Salle Wagram, Paris, France	
96	Win	73–9–14	Jimmy Doyle	KO	6 (?)	Jan 3, 1919	Trompeloup, Gironde, France	
95	Win	72–9–14	Osmin Lurie	TKO	4 (?)	Jan 1, 1919	Bordeaux, Gironde, France	
94	Win	71–9–14	Marcel Lepreux	PTS	6	Nov 7, 1918	National Sporting Club, Paris, France	
93	Win	70–9–14	Auguste Grassi	KO	2 (6)	Sep 26, 1918	National Sporting Club, Paris, France	
92	Win	69–9–14	Paul Bertal	PTS	10	Aug 4, 1918	Marseille, Bouches-du-Rhône, France	
91	Win	68–9–14	Jimmy O'Day	KO	2 (10)	Jul 28, 1918	National Sporting Club, Paris, France	
90	Win	67–9–14	Arthur Wyns	PTS	10	Jul 12, 1918	National Sporting Club, Paris, France	
89	Win	66–9–14	Eugene Clifford	KO	2 (?)	Jul 10, 1918	Paris, France	
88	Win	65–9–14	Andre Maestrini	PTS	12	Jul 4, 1918	National Sporting Club, Paris, France	
87	Win	64–9–14	Joseph Marty	TKO	9 (10)	May 30, 1918	National Sporting Club, Paris, France	
86	Win	63–9–14	Arthur Pain	KO	3 (6)	May 23, 1918	National Sporting Club, Paris, France	Date approximated
85	Win	62–9–14	Cherubin Durocher	TKO	6 (?)	Apr 29, 1918	Perpignan, Pyrénées-Orientales, France	
84	Win	61–9–14	Auguste Grassi	TKO	8 (12)	Apr 21, 1918	Arènes des Amidonniers, Toulouse, Haute-Garonne, France	
83	Win	60–9–14	Cherubin Durocher	KO	3 (?)	Apr 18, 1918	National Sporting Club, Paris, France	
82	Win	59–9–14	Auguste Grassi	KO	3 (?)	Mar 28, 1918	National Sporting Club, Paris, France	
81	Win	58–9–14	Bombardier Rousseau	KO	7 (15)	Mar 11, 1918	Théâtre des Nouveautés, Toulouse, Haute-Garonne, France	
80	Win	57–9–14	Max Henry	PTS	?	Mar 1, 1918	National Sporting Club, Paris, France	
79	Win	56–9–14	Jules Husson	TKO	? (?)	Feb 9, 1918	National Sporting Club, Paris, France	
78	Win	55–9–14	Marcel Lepreux	PTS	6	Jan 25, 1918	National Sporting Club, Paris, France	
77	Win	54–9–14	Bombardier Rousseau	PTS	12	Jan 18, 1918	Bordeaux, Gironde, France	
76	Win	53–9–14	Messens	KO	2 (?)	Jan 13, 1918	National Sporting Club, Paris, France	
75	Win	52–9–14	Edouard Prie	PTS	6	Dec 20, 1917	National Sporting Club, Paris, France	
74	Win	51–9–14	Alfred Francis	PTS	6	Dec 6, 1917	National Sporting Club, Paris, France	
73	Win	50–9–14	Marcel Lepreux	PTS	12	Nov 4, 1917	France	Unknown location, at a Military Camp in France
72	Win	49–9–14	Mareix	KO	9 (?)	Oct 20, 1917	Bordeaux, Gironde, France	
71	Win	48–9–14	Edouard Prie	PTS	6	Oct 11, 1917	National Sporting Club, Paris, France	
70	Win	47–9–14	Cherubin Durocher	PTS	6	Oct 3, 1917	Paris, France	
69	Win	46–9–14	Georges Dravin	TKO	5 (?)	Sep 26, 1917	Paris, France	
68	Win	45–9–14	Georges Gravat	PTS	4	Feb 26, 1917	National Sporting Club, Paris, France	
67	Loss	44–9–14	Charles Ledoux	TKO	12 (20)	Jul 10, 1914	Élysée Montmartre, Paris, France	
66	Win	44–8–14	Jack Bertin	PTS	10	Jun 28, 1914	Bordeaux, Gironde, France	
65	Win	43–8–14	Cherubin Durocher	PTS	15	Jun 19, 1914	Élysée Montmartre, Paris, France	
64	Win	42–8–14	Georges Lefebvre	TKO	7 (?)	Jun 4, 1914	Nantes, Loire-Atlantique, France	
63	Win	41–8–14	Abe Mantell	PTS	20	May 16, 1914	Wonderland, Paris, France	
62	Win	40–8–14	Jim Harry	KO	6 (?)	May 10, 1914	Arènes de la Benatte, Bordeaux, Gironde, France	
61	Win	39–8–14	Marcel Lepreux	PTS	20	May 1, 1914	Élysée Montmartre, Paris, France	
60	Win	38–8–14	Jack Bertin	PTS	10	Apr 10, 1914	Élysée Montmartre, Paris, France	
59	Loss	37–8–14	Percy Jones	PTS	20	Mar 26, 1914	Liverpool Stadium, Pudsey Street, Liverpool, Merseyside, France	For IBU flyweight title
58	Win	37–7–14	Pat McAllister	KO	10 (15)	Mar 13, 1914	Élysée Montmartre, Paris, France	
57	Win	36–7–14	Jack Bertin	PTS	10	Mar 7, 1914	Boxing-Buttes, Paris, France	
56	Win	35–7–14	Cherubin Durocher	TKO	7 (10)	Mar 1, 1914	Troyes, Aube, France	
55	Win	34–7–14	Gaston Simon	KO	5 (10)	Feb 16, 1914	Salle de l'Alhambra, Orléans, Loiret, France	
54	Win	33–7–14	Percy Jones	PTS	15	Feb 12, 1914	Liverpool Stadium, Pudsey Street, Liverpool, Merseyside, France	
53	Draw	32–7–14	Robert Dastillon	PTS	12	Dec 31, 1914	Élysée Montmartre, Paris, France	
52	Loss	32–7–13	Marcel Lepreux	PTS	10	Nov 29, 1913	Wonderland, Paris, France	
51	Draw	32–6–13	Robert Dastillon	PTS	20	Oct 31, 1913	Élysée Montmartre, Paris, France	
50	Win	32–6–12	Johnny Daly	PTS	10	Oct 4, 1913	Wonderland, Paris, France	
49	Win	31–6–12	Edouard Prie	DQ	5 (?)	Aug 24, 1913	Enghien, Val-d'Oise, France	
48	Win	30–6–12	Fred Anderson	PTS	10	Aug 1, 1913	Élysée Montmartre, Paris, France	
47	Win	29–6–12	Paul Manceau	PTS	10	Jun 12, 1913	Chantilly, Oise, France	
46	Draw	28–6–12	Auguste Grassi	PTS	12	Jun 6, 1913	Élysée Montmartre, Paris, France	
45	Win	28–6–11	Sebastien Demey	KO	6 (10)	May 23, 1913	Élysée Montmartre, Paris, France	
44	Loss	27–6–11	Sid Smith	UD	20	Apr 11, 1913	Élysée Montmartre, Paris, France	For IBU flyweight title
43	Win	27–5–11	Edouard Prie	PTS	10	Mar 17, 1913	Paris, France	
42	Win	26–5–11	Albert Bouzonnie	PTS	10	Feb 21, 1913	Élysée Montmartre, Paris, France	
41	Win	25–5–11	Bombardier Rousseau	PTS	10	Feb 15, 1913	Bordeaux, Gironde, France	
40	Draw	24–5–11	Alf Mansfield	PTS	10	Jan 10, 1913	Élysée Montmartre, Paris, France	
39	Draw	24–5–10	Marcel Lepreux	PTS	10	Dec 10, 1912	Palais de la Boxe, Paris, France	
38	Draw	24–5–9	Alf Mansfield	PTS	10	Nov 15, 1912	Élysée Montmartre, Paris, France	
37	Win	24–5–8	Cherubin Durocher	KO	5 (?)	Nov 9, 1912	Boulogne-sur-Mer, Pas-de-Calais, France	
36	Win	23–5–8	Francis Charles	TKO	17 (20)	Oct 30, 1912	Cirque de Paris, Paris, France	Retained France flyweight title
35	Win	22–5–8	Tom Smith	PTS	15	Oct 10, 1912	Birmingham, West Midlands, England	
34	Loss	21–5–8	Pierre Gambetta	DQ	9 (10)	Oct 8, 1912	Alcazar d'Été, Avignon, Vaucluse, France	
33	Win	21–4–8	Sebastien Demey	PTS	10	Sep 27, 1912	Élysée Montmartre, Paris, France	
32	Win	20–4–8	Jack Gatehouse	PTS	10	Aug 11, 1912	Sporting-Palace, Dinard, Ille-et-Vilaine, France	
31	Win	19–4–8	Marcel Lepreux	TKO	13 (15)	Aug 2, 1912	Élysée Montmartre, Paris, France	Retained France flyweight title
30	Win	18–4–8	Jack Gatehouse	PTS	12	Jun 28, 1912	Élysée Montmartre, Paris, France	
29	Win	17–4–8	Kid Chicken	KO	9 (10)	Jun 11, 1912	Boxing Hall, Chantilly, Oise, France	
28	Loss	16–4–8	Robert Dastillon	PTS	15	May 11, 1912	Wonderland, Paris, France	
27	Draw	16–3–8	Jack Gatehouse	PTS	10	Apr 16, 1912	Maisons-Lafitte, Val-de-Marne, France	
26	Win	16–3–7	Edouard Prie	PTS	10	Apr 12, 1912	Élysée Montmartre, Paris, France	
25	Draw	15–3–7	Jack Gatehouse	PTS	10	Mar 29, 1912	Premierland Francaise, Paris, France	
24	Win	15–3–6	Jack Gatehouse	PTS	8	Feb 24, 1912	Wonderland, Paris, France	
23	Win	14–3–6	Rene Voirin	KO	10 (?)	Feb 14, 1912	Cirque de Paris, Paris, France	Won vacant France flyweight title
22	Win	13–3–6	Buster Brown	RTD	1 (8)	Dec 30, 1911	Wonderland, Paris, France	
21	Win	12–3–6	Cherubin Durocher	PTS	4	Dec 30, 1911	Wonderland, Paris, France	
20	Win	11–3–6	Rene Voirin	PTS	8	Dec 16, 1911	Wonderland, Paris, France	
19	Win	10–3–6	Rene Voirin	PTS	4	Nov 22, 1911	Cirque de Paris, Paris, France	
18	Win	9–3–6	Cherubin Durocher	PTS	6	Nov 16, 1911	National Sporting Club, Paris, France	
17	Win	8–3–6	Jim Barrey	KO	2 (6)	Oct 28, 1911	Boxing Hall, Paris, France	
16	Win	7–3–6	Auguste Relinger	TKO	2 (?)	Oct 21, 1911	Wonderland, Paris, France	
15	Win	6–3–6	Robert Dastillon	DQ	4 (?)	Jul 30, 1911	Neuilly-sur-Seine, Hauts-de-Seine, France	
14	Win	5–3–6	Andre Teyssedre	PTS	6	Jul 29, 1911	Neuilly-sur-Seine, Hauts-de-Seine, France	
13	Draw	4–3–6	Alfred Francis	PTS	8	May 6, 1911	Wonderland, Paris, France	
12	Draw	4–3–5	Montors	PTS	4	May 2, 1911	Paris, France	
11	Loss	4–3–4	Lucien Vinez	PTS	8	Apr 22, 1911	Wonderland, Paris, France	
10	Loss	4–2–4	Marcel Mouginot	PTS	4	Apr 4, 1911	Arenes de boxe, Paris, France	
9	Win	4–1–4	Andre Teyssedre	PTS	4	Mar 21, 1911	Arenes de boxe, Paris, France	
8	Loss	3–1–4	Paul Manceau	PTS	6	Mar 6, 1911	Paris, France	
7	Draw	3–0–4	Edouard Prie	PTS	8	Feb 16, 1911	Wonderland, Paris, France	
6	Draw	3–0–3	Alfred Francis	PTS	8	Jan 19, 1911	Paris, France	
5	Win	3–0–2	L Gouzenne	PTS	4	Dec 15, 1910	Wonderland, Paris, France	
4	Win	2–0–2	Boyo Lambert	PTS	4	Nov 26, 1910	Wonderland, Paris, France	
3	Win	1–0–2	Gouguillon	PTS	4	Oct 15, 1910	Wonderland, Paris, France	
2	Draw	0–0–2	Francisque	PTS	8	Aug 8, 1910	Paris, France	Date unknown
1	Draw	0–0–1	Edouard Prie	PTS	8	Jul 7, 1910	Paris, France	Date unknown

Awards and achievements
Preceded by Johnny Kilbane	World Featherweight Champion; 2 June 1923 – 26 July 1923	Succeeded by Johnny Dundee
