= Joe Fox (boxer) =

British boxer (1894–1965)

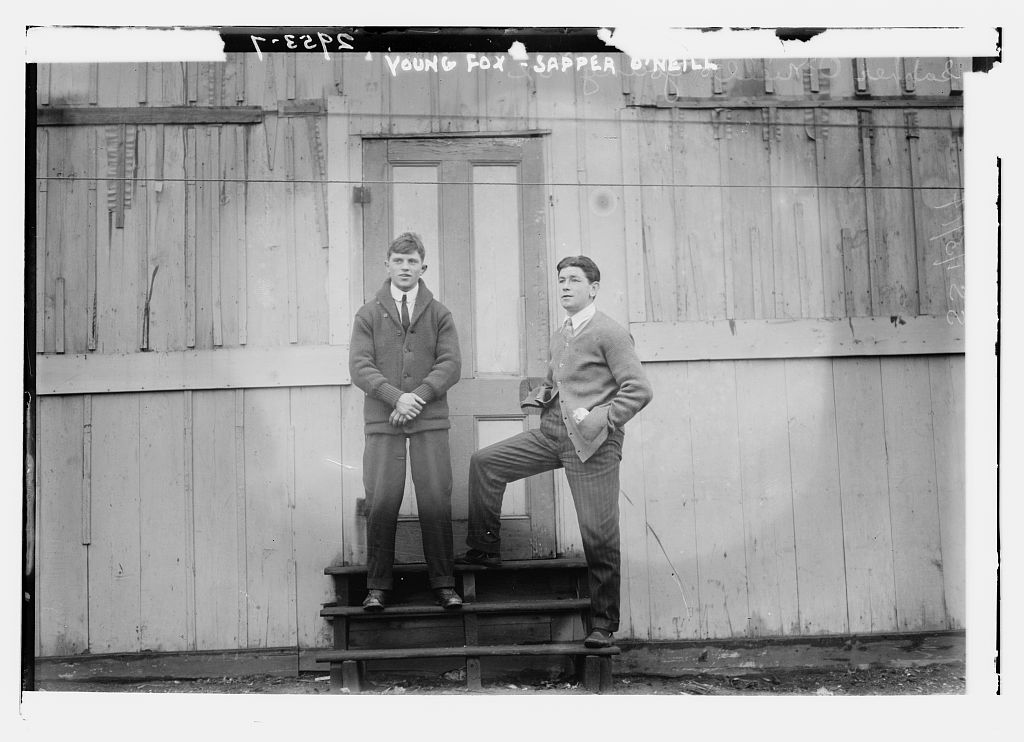

Personal information
- Nationality: British
- Born: 8 February 1894 Leeds, England
- Died: 2 April 1965 (aged 71)
- Height: 5 ft 5 in (165 cm)
- Weight: Bantamweight, featherweight

Boxing career

Boxing record
- Total fights: 147
- Wins: 73
- Win by KO: 26
- Losses: 24
- Draws: 18

Joe Fox (8 February 1894 – 2 April 1965), also known as Joey Fox and in the early part of his career Young Fox, was a British boxer who was British bantamweight champion between 1915 and 1918, and British featherweight champion between 1921 and 1924.

== Career ==
Born in Leeds, Joe Fox's earliest recorded fight was in June 1909. In January 1911 he beat former English and World champion Harry McDermott at the National Sporting Club. Between 1911 and 1913 he fought the likes of Alex Lafferty (loss), Johnny Curran (two wins, one draw), and Bill Ladbury (two losses, one win).

In December 1913 he travelled to the United States where he fought eleven times over the next eighteen months, winning nine but losing to Frankie Burns and Eddie Campi.

On his return to England he won six straight fights before a draw against Curley Walker in December 1914. He then beat Lafferty and drew with Bill Beynon before losing to Charlie Ward. He beat Beynon in August 1915 but lost to Digger Stanley a month later. When Walker vacated the British bantamweight title, Fox faced Jim Berry for the vacant title in November; Berry retired in the sixteenth round making Fox the new British champion. This fight was the start of an impressive unbeaten run for Fox which lasted for over four years.

After winning three non-title fights, including another defeat of Beynon, Fox defended his British title in April 1916 against Tommy Harrison; Fox won on points to retain the title. Later that year he beat Stanley and Tommy Noble in the space of four weeks. He made a second successful defence in June 1917, stopping Joe Symonds in the eighteenth round, to win the Lonsdale Belt outright. Fox moved up to featherweight and was due to face Tancy Lee for the British title in March 1918 but the match was cancelled due to Fox being ill.

After draws against Beynon and Fred Blakeborough, Fox had a second stint in the US during 1919 and 1920, hoping to fight for the World title, his absence from Britain necessitating the relinquishing of his title. After winning his first four fights of the tour, he won only two of his next fifteen fights (although several are disputed newspaper decisions with British newspapers giving him the decision), with World champion Johnny Kilbane beating him in July. He had one fight in Canada in May 1920 before returning home later that month with a fractured rib.

Back in England his fortunes improved again, beating Billy Marchant in his first fight back and following it with a win over Benny McNeil. In January 1921 he was charged with desertion from the 42nd Battalion Royal Fusiliers and held in Hounslow Barracks.

He faced Mike Honeyman in October 1921 for the British title. Fox took a narrow points decision to take the title, becoming the first boxer to win Lonsdale Belts at two weights. In May 1922 he faced French champion Eugene Criqui in what some sources regarded as a European title fight, Criqui stopping him in the twelfth round, the fight losing Fox's supporters £10,000 in bets.

In 1923 Fox once again travelled to North America in the hope of challenging for the World title, having several fights in the US and Canada. In August he faced Leo "Kid" Roy in Montreal for the vacant British Empire featherweight title, losing by unanimous decision. He won only two fights in North America, and after relinquishing his British title in 1924 moved on to Australia where he had twelve fights, including an unsuccessful challenge for the Australian featherweight title against Billy Grime, and a win and a loss to Bert Spargo.

On his return to England in 1925 he drew with Johnny Curley in Brighton, and beat Johnny Cuthbert before retiring from boxing later that year.
