= Bill Ladbury =

English boxer

Personal information
- Nationality: British
- Born: 14 October 1891 New Cross, London, England
- Died: June 1917 (aged 25) France
- Height: 5 ft 2 in (1.57 m)
- Weight: Flyweight; Bantamweight

Boxing career

Boxing record
- Total fights: 53
- Wins: 31
- Win by KO: 13
- Losses: 17
- Draws: 5

Bill Ladbury (14 October 1891 – June 1917) was an English professional boxer who competed from 1908 to 1917. He held the IBU world flyweight title from 1913 to 1914, as well as the British and European flyweight titles in 1913.

== Career ==
Born in New Cross, London, in 1891, Ladbury had his first professional fight in November 1908. In January 1910, he stopped Charles Ledoux in four rounds and in October 1911 he beat Albert Cocksedge to take the English 112lbs title. In November 1911 he fought Ledoux again, this time losing in four rounds, and was knocked out by Johnny Hughes only 8 days later. In 1912 he had three fights against Joe Fox, winning two and losing the third.

After a run of eight straight wins he faced Sid Smith in June 1913 for the British, European, and World (IBU) flyweight titles. He stopped Smith in the eleventh round to take the three titles. He lost all three titles in January 1914 when he was outpointed over 20 rounds by Percy Jones.

Ladbury drew with Joe Symonds in March 1914, and beat Tommy Harrison a month later, but in his third fight in eight weeks was stopped in the eighth round by Tancy Lee at the end of April.

With the outbreak of World War I, Ladbury joined the British Army, initially serving as a private in the Royal West Kent Regiment, rising to Lance-Corporal by late 1916.

He beat Hughes in December but lost all three of his fights in 1915 including another fight with Jones. His final fight was a win over Bert Clark in May 1917.

Ladbury was killed in action in France in June 1917.

== Professional boxing record ==
| 53 fights | 31 wins | 17 losses |
|---|---|---|
| By knockout | 13 | 10 |
| By decision | 18 | 7 |
| Draws | 5 | |

| No. | Result | Record | Opponent | Type | Round | Date | Location | Notes |
|---|---|---|---|---|---|---|---|---|
| 53 | Win | 31–17–5 | Bert Clark | PTS | 10 | 1 May 1917 | France | |
| 52 | Win | 30–17–5 | Alf Mansfield | PTS | 15 | 27 Nov 1916 | Hoxton Baths, London, England | |
| 51 | Win | 29–17–5 | Harry Curley | RTD | 11 (15) | 9 Nov 1916 | Plumstead Baths, London, England | |
| 50 | Loss | 28–17–5 | Tommy Noble | KO | 13 (15) | 9 Oct 1916 | New Cross Baths, London, England | |
| 49 | Loss | 28–16–5 | Tommy Noble | PTS | 15 | 21 Aug 1916 | The Ring, Blackfriars Road, England | |
| 48 | Loss | 28–15–5 | Nat Young Brooks | RTD | 12 (15) | 17 Jul 1916 | The Ring, Blackfriars Road, London, England | |
| 47 | Draw | 28–14–5 | Peter Cain | PTS | 10 | 21 Feb 1916 | New Cross Baths, London, England | |
| 46 | Win | 28–14–4 | Harry Curley | PTS | 15 | 10 Jan 1916 | New Cross Baths, London, England | |
| 45 | Loss | 27–14–4 | Percy Jones | KO | 5 (15) | 11 Oct 1915 | New Cross Baths, London, England | |
| 44 | Loss | 27–13–4 | Joe Symonds | KO | 2 (15) | 11 Jun 1915 | Cosmopolitan Gymnasium, Plymouth, England | |
| 43 | Loss | 27–12–4 | Joe Symonds | KO | 1 (20) | 22 Mar 1915 | New Cross Baths, London, England | |
| 42 | Win | 27–11–4 | Johnny Hughes | PTS | 20 | 10 Dec 1914 | New Cross Baths, London, England | |
| 41 | Loss | 26–11–4 | Tancy Lee | TKO | 8 (20) | 27 Apr 1914 | New Cross Baths, London, England | |
| 40 | Win | 26–10–4 | Tommy Harrison | RTD | 15 (20) | 6 Apr 1914 | National Sporting Club, London, England | |
| 39 | Draw | 25–10–4 | Joe Symonds | PTS | 20 | 2 Mar 1914 | New Cross Baths, London, England | |
| 38 | Loss | 25–10–3 | Percy Jones | PTS | 20 | 26 Jan 1914 | National Sporting Club, London, England | Lost IBU, Lonsdale, and world flyweight titles |
| 37 | Loss | 25–9–3 | Jimmy Berry | KO | 10 (20) | 15 Dec 1913 | New Cross Baths, London, England | |
| 36 | Win | 25–8–3 | Tommy Harrison | PTS | 20 | 24 Nov 1913 | New Cross Baths, London, England | |
| 35 | Win | 24–8–3 | Sid Smith | TKO | 11 (20) | 2 Jun 1913 | The Ring, Blackfriars Road, London, England | Won IBU, Lonsdale, and world flyweight titles |
| 34 | Win | 23–8–3 | George Peters | PTS | 10 | 7 Apr 1913 | New Cross Baths, London, England | |
| 33 | Win | 22–8–3 | Louis Ruddick | PTS | 20 | 10 Mar 1913 | New Cross Baths, London, England | |
| 32 | Win | 21–8–3 | Joe Young Wilson | KO | 17 (20) | 3 Feb 1913 | New Cross Baths, London, England | |
| 31 | Win | 20–8–3 | Young George Dando | RTD | 7 (20) | 6 Jan 1913 | New Cross Baths, London, England | |
| 30 | Win | 19–8–3 | Jack Arundel | KO | 5 (10) | 9 Dec 1912 | New Cross Baths, London, England | |
| 29 | Win | 18–8–3 | Tommy Harrison | PTS | 10 | 21 Nov 1912 | Liverpool Stadium, Liverpool, England | |
| 28 | Win | 17–8–3 | Sam Kellar | PTS | 20 | 11 Nov 1913 | The Ring, Blackfriars Road, London, England | |
| 27 | Win | 16–8–3 | Joe Young Wilson | KO | 12 (20) | 7 Oct 1912 | Plumstead Baths, London, England | |
| 26 | Loss | 15–8–3 | Nat Young Brooks | PTS | 12 | 3 Aug 1912 | Premierland, London, England | |
| 25 | Loss | 15–7–3 | Nat Young Brooks | PTS | 10 | 20 Jul 1912 | Premierland, London, England | |
| 24 | Win | 15–6–3 | Bill Kyne | PTS | 10 | 29 Jun 1912 | Premierland, London, England | |
| 23 | Loss | 14–6–3 | Joe Fox | TKO | 5 (10) | 15 Jun 1912 | Premierland, London, England | |
| 22 | Loss | 14–5–3 | Joe Young Wilson | PTS | 10 | 1 Jun 1912 | Premierland, London, England | |
| 21 | Win | 14–4–3 | Joe Fox | PTS | 10 | 27 Apr 1912 | Premierland, London, England | |
| 20 | Win | 13–4–3 | Frank Warner | PTS | 10 | 20 Apr 1912 | Premierland, London, England | |
| 19 | Win | 12–4–3 | Joe Fox | PTS | 15 | 9 Mar 1912 | Premierland, London, England | |
| 18 | Draw | 11–4–3 | Joe Young Wilson | PTS | 12 | 10 Feb 1912 | Premierland, London, England | |
| 17 | Win | 11–4–2 | Stoker Bill Hoskyne | PTS | 10 | 27 Jan 1912 | Premierland, London, England | |
| 16 | Win | 10–4–2 | Nat Young Brooks | TKO | 6 (10) | 13 Jan 1912 | Premierland, London, England | |
| 15 | Loss | 9–4–2 | Johnny Hughes | KO | 3 (20) | 16 Nov 1911 | Pitfield Street Baths, London, England | |
| 14 | Loss | 9–3–2 | Charles Ledoux | RTD | 4 (10) | 8 Nov 1911 | Salle Wagram, Paris, France | |
| 13 | Draw | 9–2–2 | Georges Gaillard | PTS | 10 | 4 Nov 1911 | Wonderland, Paris, France | |
| 12 | Win | 9–2–1 | Albert Cocksedge | KO | 7 (20) | 16 Oct 1911 | Belgrave Rink, Leicester, England | |
| 11 | Win | 8–2–1 | Sweeper Madge | PTS | 10 | 15 Jul 1911 | Wonderland, Whitechapel Road, London, England | |
| 10 | Win | 7–2–1 | Jack Arundel | RTD | 10 (10) | 18 Feb 1911 | Palace Pavilion, London, England | |
| 9 | Win | 6–2–1 | Stoker Bill Hoskyne | PTS | 10 | 30 Jan 1911 | Manor Place Baths, London, England | |
| 8 | Loss | 5–2–1 | Sam Kellar | PTS | 20 | 28 Feb 1910 | National Sporting Club, London, England | |
| 7 | Win | 5–1–1 | Charles Ledoux | RTD | 4 (10) | 8 Jan 1910 | Wonderland, Paris, France | |
| 6 | Loss | 4–1–1 | Johnny Condon | PTS | 15 | 29 Nov 1909 | National Sporting Club, London, England | |
| 5 | Win | 4–0–1 | Albert Bass | TKO | 4 (10) | 29 Mar 1909 | Camberwell Baths, London, England | |
| 4 | Win | 3–0–1 | Young Longhorn | PTS | 10 | 8 Mar 1909 | Camberwell Baths, London, England | |
| 3 | Win | 2–0–1 | Jack Fox | RTD | 10 (15) | 18 Jan 1909 | Camberwell Baths, London, England | |
| 2 | Draw | 1–0–1 | Jack Fox | PTS | 6 | 30 Nov 1908 | Camberwell Baths, London, England | |
| 1 | Win | 1–0 | Bob Campion | PTS | 6 | 9 Nov 1908 | New Cross Hall, London, England | |

Minor world boxing titles
| Preceded by Sid Smith | IBU flyweight champion June 2, 1913 – January 26, 1914 | Succeeded by Percy Jones |
