= Percy Jones (boxer) =

Welsh boxer (1892–1922)

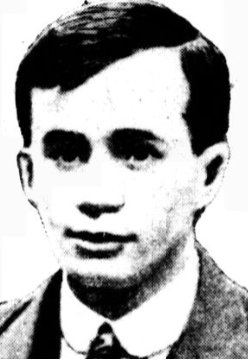

Personal information
- Nationality: British
- Born: 26 December 1892 Porth, Wales
- Died: 25 December 1922 (aged 29)
- Weight: Flyweight; Bantamweight

Boxing career

Boxing record
- Total fights: 56
- Wins: 50
- Win by KO: 31
- Losses: 3
- Draws: 3

Percy Jones (26 December 1892 – 25 December 1922) was a Welsh professional boxing world champion who competed from 1911 to 1916. He became the first Welshman to win a World championship when he took the IBU flyweight title from Bill Ladbury in 1914. The IBU later became the EBU and that is why the achievement was taken into context when comparing fighters of the same era. Jones also took the British and European flyweight titles from Ladbury in the same match. He has been voted number 6 in a BBC poll of Welsh boxing greats.

== History ==
Born in Porth and raised in a coal mining family, Jones made his name at a local level, fighting in boxing booths.

His first significant professional fight was a win (via disqualification) over Joe Symonds in March 1913. He beat Symonds twice more later that year, and in November stopped Sam Kellar in the fifteenth round in a final eliminator for the vacant British flyweight title. This led to a challenge in January 1914 for Bill Ladbury's title, Jones winning on points to be recognised as champion of Britain, Europe, and the World.

He lost to Eugene Criqui in his next (non-title) fight, but beat the Frenchman on points in April in a defence of his European title. In his next non-title bout, he was knocked out Symonds in the eighteenth round of twenty.

He was forced to relinquish the British and World titles after failing to make the weight in two title fights. He lost to Tancy Lee in October 1914 in what should have been a British title fight, prompting a move up to bantamweight. His last professional contest was a fifth-round KO of Ladbury in October 1915, although he competed in an army contest the following year.

Jones was a vegetarian. He relied upon mountain walking for his exercise.

== Army service ==
World War I interrupted his boxing career with Jones enlisting in the Glamorgan Bantam Battalion of the Welsh Army Service Corps on 2 January 1915. He was serving as a sergeant at the Somme in the Royal Welsh Fusiliers when he was badly wounded in the leg in 1916. After almost 30 operations to save the leg it was eventually amputated in 1918. Jones was also badly affected by poison gas.

His weight dropped to a little over 4 stone, and he died of trench fever in 1922 on Christmas Day, one day short of his 30th birthday.

== Fight record ==
Jones is recorded on Boxrec.com as having 56 professional fights, with 50 wins, 3 losses and 3 draws.

== Professional boxing record ==
56 fights	50 wins	3 losses
By knockout	31	2
By decision	18	1
By disqualification	1	0
Draws	3	

No.	Result	Record	Opponent	Type	Round	Date	Location	Notes
56	Win	50–3–3	Private Cole	PTS	6	Feb 10, 1916	Barracks HQ Gym, Aldershot, Hampshire, England, U.K.	
55	Win	49–3–3	Private Townsend	RTD	6 (6)	Feb 10, 1916	Barracks HQ Gym, Aldershot, Hampshire, England, U.K.	
54	Win	48–3–3	Bill Ladbury	KO	5 (15)	Oct 11, 1915	New Cross Baths, New Cross, London, England, U.K.	
53	Draw	47–3–3	Young Swift	PTS	15	Oct 1, 1915	Cosmopolitan Gymnasium, Plymouth, Devon, England, U.K.	
52	Win	47–3–2	Private Rees	TKO	3 (15)	Sep 29, 1915	Riding School, Aldershot, Hampshire, England, U.K.	
51	Win	46–3–2	Gomer Perkins	KO	3 (10)	Jul 29, 1915	Pictorium Cinema, Porth, Wales, U.K.	
50	Loss	45–3–2	Tancy Lee	RTD	14 (15)	Oct 19, 1914	National Sporting Club, Covent Garden, London, England, U.K.	
49	Win	45–2–2	Billy Fanner	RTD	9 (15)	Sep 19, 1914	Palladium, Abertillery, Wales, U.K.	
48	Win	44–2–2	Jim Young Kendall	RTD	4 (15)	Jun 3, 1914	Pavilion, Tonyrefail, Wales, U.K.	
47	Win	43–2–2	George Reeves	RTD	7 (15)	Jun 2, 1914	Pavilion Skating Rink, Tonypandy, Wales, U.K.	
46	Loss	42–2–2	Joe Symonds	RTD	18 (20)	May 15, 1914	Cosmopolitan Gymnasium, Plymouth, Devon, England, U.K.	Lost IBU, Lonsdale, and world flyweight titles
45	Win	42–1–2	Eugène Criqui	PTS	20	Mar 26, 1914	Liverpool Stadium, Pudsey Street, Liverpool, Merseyside, England, U.K.	Retained IBU, Lonsdale, and world flyweight titles
44	Loss	41–1–2	Eugène Criqui	PTS	15	Feb 12, 1914	Liverpool Stadium, Pudsey Street, Liverpool, Merseyside, England, U.K.	
43	Win	41–0–2	Bill Ladbury	PTS	20	Jan 26, 1914	National Sporting Club, Covent Garden, London, England, U.K.	Won IBU, Lonsdale, and world flyweight titles
42	Win	40–0–2	Marcel Million	RTD	3 (15)	Jan 8, 1914	Liverpool Stadium, Pudsey Street, Liverpool, Merseyside, England, U.K.	
41	Win	39–0–2	Driver Knox	KO	1 (15)	Dec 6, 1913	Pavilion Skating Rink, Tonypandy, Wales, U.K.	
40	Win	38–0–2	Alf Mansfield	RTD	8 (15)	Nov 27, 1913	Liverpool Stadium, Pudsey Street, Liverpool, Merseyside, England, U.K.	
39	Win	37–0–2	Sam Kellar	TKO	15 (15)	Nov 24, 1913	National Sporting Club, Covent Garden, London, England, U.K.	Eliminator British flyweight title
38	Win	36–0–2	Joe Wilson	RTD	12 (15)	Nov 8, 1913	Pavilion Skating Rink, Tonypandy, Wales, U.K.	
37	Win	35–0–2	Joe Wilson	KO	13 (15)	Oct 18, 1913	Pavilion Skating Rink, Tonypandy, Wales, U.K.	
36	Win	34–0–2	Tom Cherry	PTS	15	Oct 11, 1913	Pavilion Skating Rink, Tonypandy, Wales, U.K.	
35	Win	33–0–2	Young Beynon	PTS	15	Sep 20, 1913	Pavilion Skating Rink, Tonypandy, Wales, U.K.	
34	Win	32–0–2	Joe Symonds	RTD	8 (15)	Sep 18, 1913	Olympia Skating Rink, Hanley, Staffordshire, England, U.K.	
33	Win	31–0–2	Bill Kyne	PTS	10	Jul 21, 1913	Pavilion, Tonypandy, Wales, U.K.	
32	Win	30–0–2	Tom Cherry	RTD	6 (15)	Jul 10, 1913	Liverpool Stadium, Pudsey Street, Liverpool, Merseyside, England, U.K.	
31	Win	29–0–2	Young Baker	RTD	8 (12)	Jul 5, 1913	Marquee, Tonypandy, Wales, U.K.	
30	Win	28–0–2	Bill Kyne	PTS	10	Jun 23, 1913	National Sporting Club, Covent Garden, London, England, U.K.	
29	Win	27–0–2	Alf Mansfield	RTD	6 (12)	Jun 7, 1913	Pavilion Skating Rink, Tonypandy, Wales, U.K.	
28	Win	26–0–2	Dido Gains	PTS	15	Jun 5, 1913	Liverpool Stadium, Pudsey Street, Liverpool, Merseyside, England, U.K.	
27	Win	25–0–2	Joe Symonds	PTS	10	Jun 2, 1913	National Sporting Club, Covent Garden, London, England, U.K.	
26	Win	24–0–2	Young George Dando	RTD	4 (15)	May 22, 1913	Liverpool Stadium, Pudsey Street, Liverpool, Merseyside, England, U.K.	
25	Win	23–0–2	Tommy Harrison	RTD	8 (15)	May 8, 1913	Liverpool Stadium, Pudsey Street, Liverpool, Merseyside, England, U.K.	
24	Win	22–0–2	Gustaaf Govaerts	PTS	6	Apr 28, 1913	National Sporting Club, Covent Garden, London, England, U.K.	
23	Win	21–0–2	Tommy Lewis	PTS	12	Apr 5, 1913	Marquee, Tonypandy, Wales, U.K.	
22	Win	20–0–2	Stoker Bill Hoskyne	KO	3 (12)	Mar 29, 1913	Marquee, Tonypandy, Wales, U.K.	
21	Win	19–0–2	Joe Symonds	DQ	4 (12)	Mar 22, 1913	Marquee, Tonypandy, Wales, U.K.	
20	Win	18–0–2	WB Jones	TKO	2 (10)	Feb 8, 1913	Scarrott's Pavilion, Tonypandy, Wales, U.K.	
19	Win	17–0–2	Jim Young Kendall	RTD	4 (15)	Feb 1, 1913	Scarrott's Pavilion, Tonypandy, Wales, U.K.	
18	Win	16–0–2	Young Rule	TKO	9 (20)	Jan 25, 1913	Hippodrome, Tonypandy, Wales, U.K.	
17	Win	15–0–2	George Williams	TKO	11 (15)	Jan 11, 1913	Scarrott's Pavilion, Tonypandy, Wales, U.K.	
16	Win	14–0–2	Curly Pullman	RTD	7 (10)	Dec 26, 1912	Scarrott's Pavilion, Tonypandy, Wales, U.K.	
15	Win	13–0–2	Dai Matthews	PTS	6	Dec 14, 1912	American Skating Rink, Cardiff, Wales, U.K.	
14	Win	12–0–2	Young Jimmy England	TKO	7 (10)	Dec 7, 1912	Hippodrome, Tonypandy, Wales, U.K.	
13	Win	11–0–2	Sam Morgan	PTS	6	Nov 30, 1912	Scarrott's Pavilion, Tonypandy, Wales, U.K.	
12	Win	10–0–2	Harry Stuckey	PTS	6	Nov 23, 1912	Scarrott's Pavilion, Tonypandy, Wales, U.K.	
11	Win	9–0–2	Will Gould	TKO	5 (10)	Nov 16, 1912	Scarrott's Pavilion, Tonypandy, Wales, U.K.	
10	Draw	8–0–2	Charlie Yeomans	PTS	10	Oct 5, 1912	Drill Hall, Pentre, Wales, U.K.	
9	Win	8–0–1	Shon Price	PTS	10	Sep 20, 1912	Drill Hall, Pentre, Wales, U.K.	
8	Win	7–0–1	Billy Farmer	TKO	5 (?)	Jul 1, 1912	Pentre, Wales, U.K.	Date unknown
7	Win	6–0–1	Gordon Francis	TKO	3 (?)	Jun 1, 1912	Drill Hall, Pentre, Wales, U.K.	Date unknown
6	Win	5–0–1	Lewis Williams	PTS	6	Apr 1, 1912	Pavilion, Tonypandy, Wales, U.K.	Date unknown
5	Win	4–0–1	Con Rowlands	KO	5 (?)	Feb 1, 1912	Drill Hall, Pentre, Wales, U.K.	Date unknown
4	Win	3–0–1	Dai Davies	KO	9 (?)	Jan 1, 1912	Drill Hall, Pentre, Wales, U.K.	Date unknown
3	Win	2–0–1	Manny Chamberlain	PTS	6	Nov 11, 1911	Drill Hall, Pentre, Wales, U.K.	
2	Win	1–0–1	Young Roberts	PTS	6	Nov 10, 1911	Drill Hall, Pentre, Wales, U.K.	Date unknown
1	Draw	0–0–1	Young Roberts	PTS	6	Nov 9, 1911	Drill Hall, Pentre, Wales, U.K.	Date unknown

== See also ==
- List of Welsh boxing world champions
- List of British flyweight boxing champions

== Sources ==
- "6. Percy Jones". BBC News. 11 April 2002.
- johnnyowen.com

Minor world boxing titles
Preceded by Sid Smith	IBU flyweight champion January 26 – May 15, 1914; Stripped	Vacant Title next held by Tancy Lee
