= Mike Honeyman =

English boxer

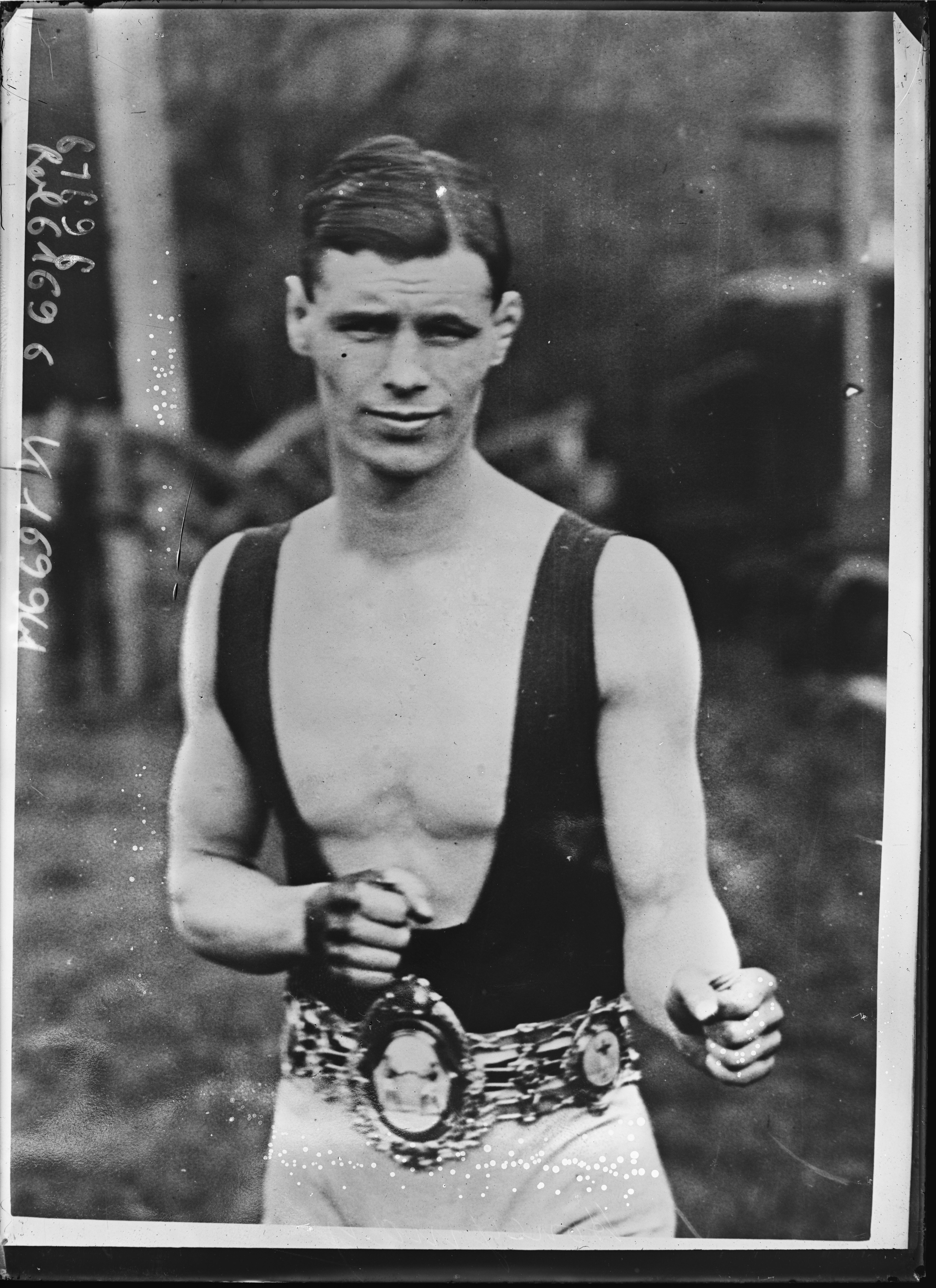

Personal information
- Nationality: British
- Born: 11 November 1896
- Died: 1944 (aged 48) Dagenham, England
- Weight: Featherweight

Boxing career

Boxing record
- Total fights: 154
- Wins: 95
- Win by KO: 23
- Losses: 40
- Draws: 19

Mike Honeyman (11 November 1896 – 1944) was a British boxer who was British featherweight champion between 1920 and 1921.

== Career ==
From Woolwich, London, Mike Honeyman had his first recorded professional fight in 1914. He won most of his early bouts, but in March 1915 was knocked out in the second round by Charlie Hardcastle. Between September 1915 and December 1916 he lost more fights than he won, suffering defeats to Ben Callicott, Bob Cotton, and Hardcastle, but beat some highly regarded opponents including Curley Walker and Alex Lafferty.

He started 1917 with a win over Young Joe Brooks, and went on to build up a ten-fight unbeaten run, which included wins over Cotton and Tommy Noble. He drew with Walker in March 1918 and in May 1919 beat a then novice Seaman Nobby Hall and in October beat Billy Marchant. By the end of 1919 he had built up a run of eleven straight wins, and in January 1920 faced Marchant at the National Sporting Club for the vacant British featherweight title. Honeyman took a points decision to become British champion.

In May 1920 he faced Arthur Wyns for the vacant European featherweight title, losing after being knocked out in the tenth round.

He beat Callicott in September and in October beat future European lightweight champion Lucien Vinez. He made the first defence of his British title in October 1920, his opponent Tancy Lee retiring in the nineteenth round. He made a second defence in October 1921, Joe Fox taking the title on points.

Honeyman beat Callicott twice in the space of eight days in January 1922. He never again challenged for a title, but fought many of the top boxers of the era during the last few years of his career, including Harry Mason (lost, drew), Joe Conn (won twice), Danny Frush (lost), Ernie Rice (lost), and Sam Steward (lost). He retired in 1929 after losing his last six fights.

Honeyman became boxing instructor to the Royal Air Force in 1923, and also worked as a referee. He continued in his RAF role until illness forced him to leave in 1939. After a long period in West Ham Sanitorium, Dagenham, he died in 1944, aged 48, the death reported on 2 December.
