= Sid Smith (boxer) =

English boxer (1889–1948)

- Smith wearing Lonsdale Belt

Personal information
- Nationality: British
- Born: Sid Smith; 2 February 1889 Bermondsey, London, England
- Died: 28 April 1948 (aged 59)
- Height: 5 ft 4 in (1.63 m)
- Weight: Light flyweight; Flyweight; Bantamweight

Boxing career

Boxing record
- Total fights: 101
- Wins: 78
- Win by KO: 11
- Losses: 17
- Draws: 6
- No contests: 0

Sid Smith (2 February 1889 – 28 April 1948) was an English professional boxer who competed from 1907 to 1919. He was the first officially recognised BBBofC British flyweight champion, holding the title from 1912 to 1913, and was also recognized by the International Boxing Union as the world flyweight champion in 1913.

== Professional career ==
Born in Bermondsey, London, of Jewish heritage, Smith learned to box as a boy at the Oxford Medical Mission in Bermondsey.

He had his first professional fight on 1 February 1907, a day before his eighteenth birthday, beating Jack Brooks on points over six rounds.

He was not known to be hard hitter but was fast, and displayed outstanding footwork.

Smith held an early claim to the championship of England, beating Stoker Bill Hoskyne over 20 2-minute rounds in September 1911, at The Ring, Blackfriars, London on points, and beating Louis Ruddick on points in October 1911 at Liverpool Stadium.

=== Taking the British Empire flyweight title, December, 1911 ===
On 4 December 1911, he was matched with Joe Wilson, at the National Sporting Club, Covent Garden, winning the Club's newly introduced English (later British) title in the flyweight division and the first Lonsdale Belt. Wilson stepped in with two weeks notice to replace Sam Kellar, the originally scheduled boxer. Smith was down four times in the twenty round bout for short counts, but was still reported to have won handily.

Smith arrived in New York in February 1912 with British bantamweight boxer Billy Merchant. In a rare American bout on 24 February 1912, Smith fought a six-round draw by newspaper decision of the Philadelphia Item against talented Jewish boxer Louisiana in Philadelphia. In a fast bout, both boxers exhibited exceptional ringcraft, and footwork. Many boxing reporters, as well as Smith's manager W.E. Ames and Smith himself, hoped for a match with American boxer and reigning world bantamweight champion Johnny Coulon for a world championship, but Coulon's handlers were not interested. At the time, America did not have a flyweight boxing division, allowing Smith to compete against America's top bantams, including Coulon.

On 19 September 1912, he made the first defence of his British flyweight title against Curley Walker at the Ring in Southwark, England, winning on points in a twenty-round bout.

=== Taking the European and world flyweight titles, April, 1913 ===
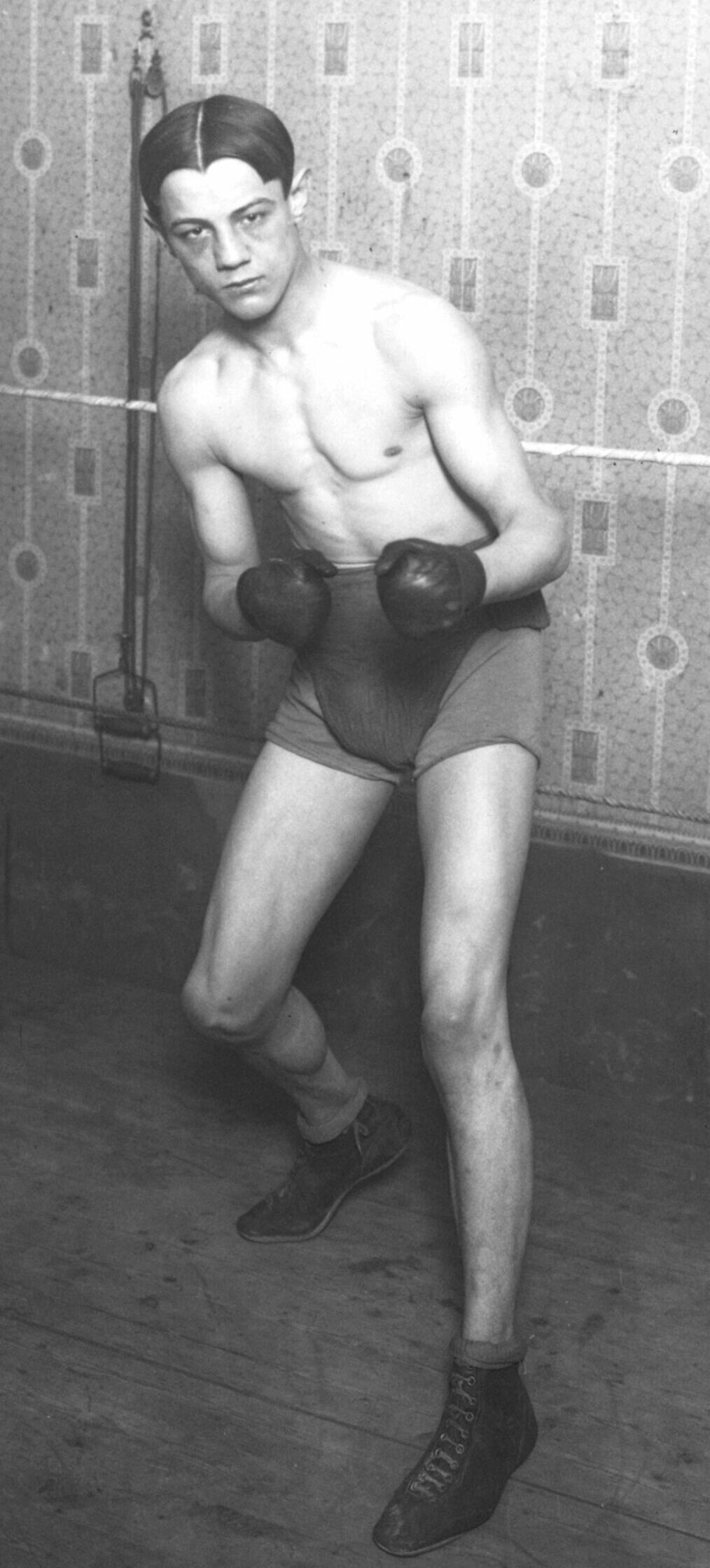
Eugene Criqui

In April 1913, he fought in Élysée Montmartre, Paris against reigning champion Frenchman Eugene Criqui for the European flyweight title and the World flyweight title, as recognized by the International Boxing Union. The bout was billed as the 112 pound (flyweight) championship. He beat Criqui on points over twenty rounds to take both titles. The ruling was a unanimous decision. An exceptional competitor, Criqui would move up a weight division and take the world bantamweight championship as well in 1923.

On 2 June 1913, he defended his titles against Bill Ladbury at Blackfriars, London. He lost the bout after holding his titles only seven weeks, suffering a technical knockout when the fight was stopped in the eleventh round.

On 24 October 1913, unable to return to the ring for the sixth round, he lost to Charles Ledoux at the Élysée Montmartre in Paris.

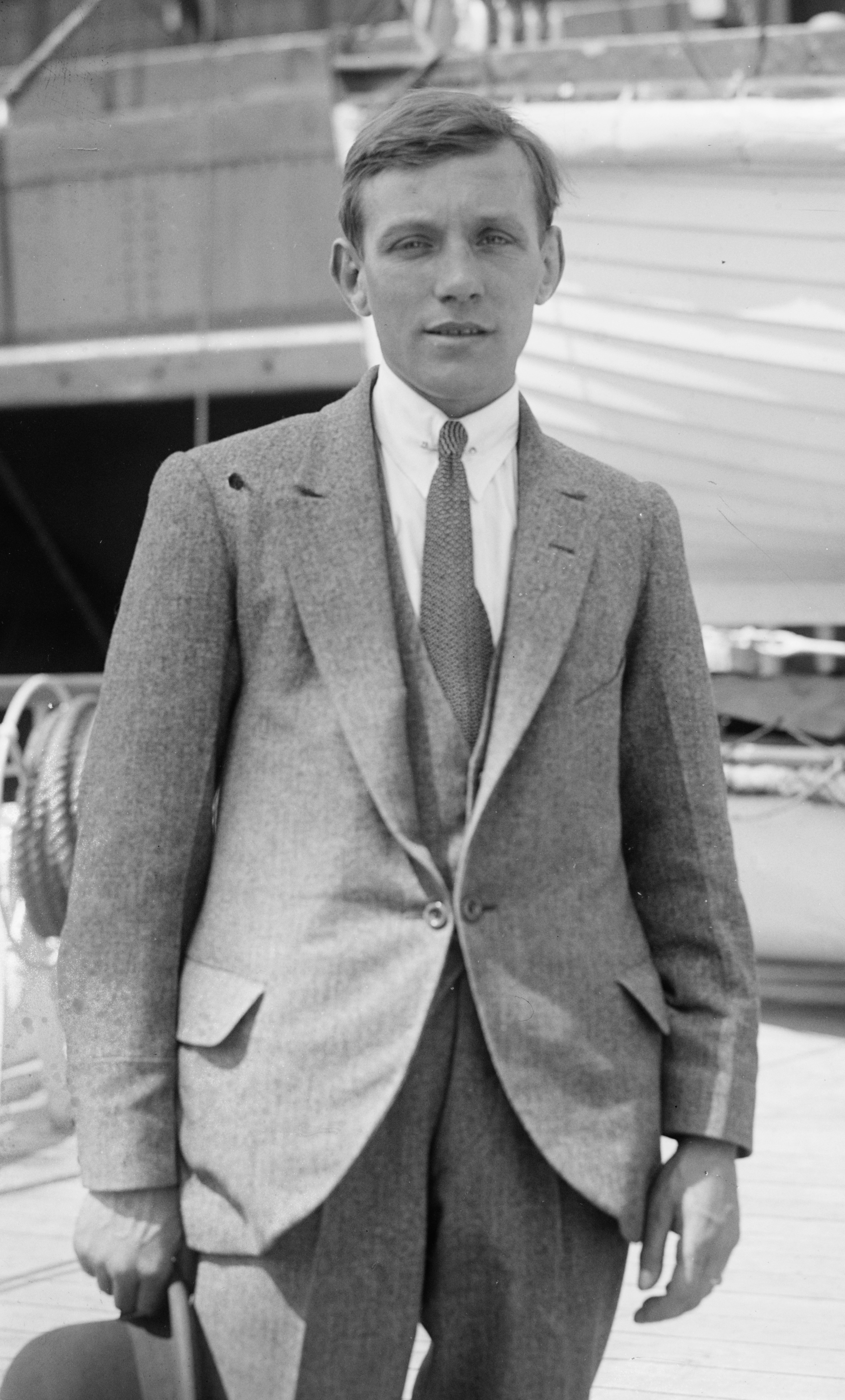
Jimmy Wilde

He lost his last bout with his talented rival, former British bantamweight champion and future world flyweight champion, Jimmy Wilde on 27 March 1916 at Hoxton Baths, London, in a third-round knockout of a fifteen-round match. Smith lost two previous meeting with Wilde, a knockout loss in a title bout in December 1914, and an eighth-round technical knockout loss in December 1915. In their December 1914 bout in Liverpool, Wilde successfully defended his claim to the British 112 pound (flyweight) title.

He continued fighting until December 1919, when he had his last fight, beating Johnny Marshall in an eleventh-round technical knockout on 26 December 1919, at the Royal Albert Hall.

== Life after boxing retirement ==
After retiring from boxing, he went into coaching boys, earning a living with a 'guess your weight' machine at markets in South London, though plagued by health problems. He trained professionals, including Joe Lynch prior to his fight with Jimmy Wilde, and was recruited to the Knights of Columbus to train United States Army boxers stationed in Britain. He also entertained, appearing on the stage with Harry Wheldon.

He had three sons, Sid, a jockey, Harry, and Bobby.

Smith died on 29 April 1948, his funeral was held on 4 May at St. Patrick's Cemetery in Leytonstone.

== Professional boxing record ==
All information in this section is derived from BoxRec, unless otherwise stated.

=== Official record ===
101 fights	78 wins	17 losses
By knockout	11	8
By decision	66	9
By disqualification	1	0
Draws	5	
Newspaper decisions/draws	1	

All newspaper decisions are officially regarded as “no decision” bouts and are not counted in the win/loss/draw column.

No.	Result	Record	Opponent	Type	Round	Date	Location	Notes
101	Win	78–17–5 (1)	Johnny Marshall	TKO	11 (15)	Dec 26, 1918	Assembly Rooms, Surbiton, London, England, U.K.	
100	Win	77–17–5 (1)	Jerry Lyons	RTD	9 (10)	Oct 12, 1918	Market Hall, Redhill, London, England, U.K.	
99	Win	76–17–5 (1)	Billy Garrard	PTS	6	Sep 17, 1918	Botanic Gardens, Regenets Park, London, England, U.K.	
98	Win	75–17–5 (1)	Sid Whatley	PTS	10	Apr 22, 1918	National Sporting Club, Covent Garden, London, England, U.K.	
97	Loss	74–17–5 (1)	Joe Conn	RTD	4 (20)	Oct 15, 1917	The Ring, Blackfriars Road, Southwark, London, England, U.K.	
96	Loss	74–16–5 (1)	Tommy Noble	TKO	5 (20)	Apr 23, 1917	The Ring, Blackfriars Road, Southwark, London, England, U.K.	
95	Win	74–15–5 (1)	Billy Affleck	TKO	13 (20)	Feb 12, 1917	National Sporting Club, Covent Garden, London, England, U.K.	
94	Loss	73–15–5 (1)	George Clark	PTS	20	Jan 29, 1917	The Ring, Blackfriars Road, Southwark, London, England, U.K.	
93	Win	73–14–5 (1)	Sid Whatley	KO	16 (20)	Jan 8, 1917	The Ring, Blackfriars Road, Southwark, London, England, U.K.	
92	Win	72–14–5 (1)	Jack Josephs	PTS	15	Jun 22, 1916	Liverpool Stadium, Pudsey Street, Liverpool, Merseyside, England, U.K.	
91	Win	71–14–5 (1)	Ivor Day	PTS	15	Jun 1, 1916	Liverpool Stadium, Pudsey Street, Liverpool, Merseyside, England, U.K.	
90	Win	70–14–5 (1)	Dido Gains	PTS	20	May 20, 1916	The Ring, Blackfriars Road, Southwark, London, England, U.K.	
89	Loss	69–14–5 (1)	Jimmy Wilde	KO	3 (15)	Mar 27, 1916	Hoxton Baths, Hoxton, London, England, U.K.	
88	Win	69–13–5 (1)	Sid Shields	PTS	15	Feb 17, 1916	Pitfield Street Baths, Hoxton, London, England, U.K.	
87	Loss	68–13–5 (1)	Jimmy Wilde	TKO	8 (15)	Dec 20, 1915	National Sporting Club, Covent Garden, London, England, U.K.	
86	Draw	68–12–5 (1)	Johnny Best	PTS	20	May 3, 1915	Victoria AC, Glasgow, Scotland, U.K.	
85	Draw	68–12–4 (1)	Johnny Best	PTS	20	Mar 20, 1915	West London Stadium, Marylebone, London, England, U.K.	
84	Win	68–12–3 (1)	Young Riley	PTS	6	Mar 17, 1915	Plymouth, Devon, England, U.K.	
83	Loss	67–12–3 (1)	Joe Symonds	RTD	4 (20)	Feb 15, 1915	New Cross Baths, New Cross, London, England, U.K.	
82	Win	67–11–3 (1)	Johnny Marshall	DQ	4 (20)	Dec 19, 1914	Victoria AC, Glasgow, Scotland, U.K.	
81	Loss	66–11–3 (1)	Jimmy Wilde	TKO	9 (15)	Dec 3, 1914	Liverpool Stadium, Pudsey Street, Liverpool, Merseyside, England, U.K.	For British 112lbs title claim
80	Win	66–10–3 (1)	Billy Young Rowlands	PTS	20	Oct 26, 1914	The Ring, Blackfriars Road, Southwark, London, England, U.K.	
79	Loss	65–10–3 (1)	Alf Wye	PTS	20	Mar 23, 1914	The Ring, Blackfriars Road, Southwark, London, England, U.K.	
78	Win	65–9–3 (1)	Alf Wye	PTS	20	Feb 16, 1914	The Ring, Blackfriars Road, Southwark, London, England, U.K.	
77	Loss	64–9–3 (1)	Alf Wye	PTS	15	Nov 3, 1913	National Sporting Club, Covent Garden, London, England, U.K.	
76	Loss	64–8–3 (1)	Charles Ledoux	RTD	6 (20)	Oct 24, 1913	Élysée Montmartre, Paris, Paris, France	
75	Win	64–7–3 (1)	Ike Young Bradley	PTS	10	Oct 9, 1913	Liverpool Stadium, Pudsey Street, Liverpool, Merseyside, England, U.K.	
74	Loss	63–7–3 (1)	Bill Ladbury	RTD	11 (20)	Jun 2, 1913	The Ring, Blackfriars Road, Southwark, London, England, U.K.	Lost IBU, Lonsdale, and world flyweight titles
73	Win	63–6–3 (1)	Joe Symonds	PTS	15	May 16, 1913	Cosmopolitan Gymnasium, Plymouth, Devon, England, U.K.	
72	Win	62–6–3 (1)	Eugène Criqui	UD	20	Apr 11, 1913	Élysée Montmartre, Paris, Paris, France	Retained IBU, Lonsdale, and world flyweight titles
71	Win	61–6–3 (1)	Charlie Ward	PTS	10	Mar 28, 1913	Canterbury Music Hall, Lambeth, London, England, U.K.	
70	Win	60–6–3 (1)	Danny Elliott	PTS	8	Mar 25, 1913	Gladstone Hall, Windsor Liberal Club, Windsor, Berkshire, England, U.K.	
69	Win	59–6–3 (1)	Kid Hogan	PTS	6	Mar 15, 1913	The Dome, Brighton, Sussex, England, U.K.	
68	Win	58–6–3 (1)	Sam Kellar	PTS	20	Feb 24, 1913	The Ring, Blackfriars Road, Southwark, London, England, U.K.	
67	Win	57–6–3 (1)	Charlie Ward	PTS	6	Feb 14, 1913	Chandos Hall, Stratford, London, England, U.K.	
66	Win	56–6–3 (1)	Albert Bouzonnie	PTS	10	Feb 12, 1913	Cirque de Paris, Paris, Paris, France	
65	Win	55–6–3 (1)	Danny Elliott	PTS	6	Jan 23, 1913	Stratford, London, England, U.K.	
64	Win	54–6–3 (1)	Albert Bouzonnie	PTS	10	Dec 20, 1912	The King's Hall, London Road, Walworth, London, England, U.K.	
63	Win	53–6–3 (1)	Curley Walker	PTS	20	Sep 19, 1912	The Ring, Blackfriars Road, Southwark, London, England, U.K.	
62	Draw	52–6–3 (1)	Joseph "Louisiana" Biderberg	NWS	6	Feb 24, 1912	National A.C., Philadelphia, Pennsylvania, U.S.	
61	Win	52–6–3	Joe Wilson	PTS	20	Dec 4, 1911	National Sporting Club, Covent Garden, London, England, U.K.	Won inaugural Lonsdale and vacant world flyweight titles
60	Win	51–6–3	Louis Ruddick	PTS	20	Oct 19, 1911	Liverpool Stadium, Pudsey Street, Liverpool, Merseyside, England, U.K.	
59	Win	50–6–3	Georges Gaillard	PTS	10	Oct 2, 1911	Empress Rink, Earl's Court, London, England, U.K.	
58	Win	49–6–3	Stoker Bill Hoskyne	PTS	20	Sep 25, 1911	The Ring, Blackfriars Road, Southwark, London, England, U.K.	
57	Win	48–6–3	Kid Hogan	KO	8 (10)	Aug 4, 1911	Engineers Drill Hall, Portsmouth, Hampshire, England, U.K.	
56	Win	47–6–3	Kid Hogan	PTS	10	Mar 20, 1911	The Ring, Blackfriars Road Matinee, Southwark, London, England, U.K.	
55	Win	46–6–3	Kid Hogan	PTS	6	Mar 8, 1911	Olympia Annexe, Kensington, London, England, U.K.	
54	Win	45–6–3	George Peters	PTS	15	Jan 30, 1911	Manor Place Baths, Walworth, London, England, U.K.	Claimed vacant British 112lbs title
53	Win	44–6–3	Kid Hogan	KO	7 (20)	Jan 25, 1911	Free Trade Hall, Leicester, Leicestershire, England, U.K.	
52	Win	43–6–3	Stoker Bill Hoskyne	PTS	6	Jan 11, 1911	Annexe Olympia, Kensington, London, England, U.K.	
51	Win	42–6–3	Bob Finch	KO	2 (10)	Dec 26, 1910	The Ring, Blackfriars Road, Southwark, London, England, U.K.	
50	Win	41–6–3	Alex Lafferty	PTS	20	Dec 5, 1910	Victoria AC, Glasgow, Scotland, U.K.	
49	Win	40–6–3	George Hearne	PTS	6	Nov 16, 1910	King's Hall, London Road, Southwark, London, England, U.K.	
48	Win	39–6–3	Bert Moughton	PTS	10	Nov 12, 1910	The Ring, Blackfriars Road, Southwark, London, England, U.K.	
47	Loss	38–6–3	Paddy Carroll	PTS	20	Nov 10, 1910	Liverpool Arena, Liverpool, Merseyside, England, U.K.	
46	Win	38–5–3	Harry Prosser	PTS	6	Oct 19, 1910	King's Hall, London Road, Southwark, London, England, U.K.	
45	Win	37–5–3	Ginger Osborne	RTD	9 (10)	Oct 10, 1910	The Ring, Blackfriars Road, Southwark, London, England, U.K.	
44	Win	36–5–3	Bob Finch	PTS	6	Oct 3, 1910	The Empire, Holborn, London, England, U.K.	
43	Win	35–5–3	Kid Logan	PTS	6	Sep 1, 1910	London, England, U.K.	Date unknown
42	Win	34–5–3	Paddy Carroll	PTS	10	Jun 6, 1910	King's Hall, London Road, Southwark, London, England, U.K.	
41	Draw	33–5–3	Albert Cocksedge	PTS	20	Feb 23, 1910	Free Trade Hall, Leicester, Leicestershire, England, U.K.	
40	Win	33–5–2	Paddy Carroll	PTS	20	Feb 17, 1910	International A.C., Liverpool, Merseyside, England, U.K.	
39	Win	32–5–2	Joe Shear	PTS	10	Jan 27, 1910	King's Hall, London Road, Southwark, London, England, U.K.	
38	Win	31–5–2	Bill Kyne	PTS	6	Jan 17, 1910	The Empire, Holborn, London, England, U.K.	
37	Win	30–5–2	Jim Butler	PTS	20	Jan 10, 1910	Drill Hall, Birkenhead, Merseyside, England, U.K.	
36	Win	29–5–2	Bill Kyne	PTS	6	Dec 20, 1909	National Sporting Club, Covent Garden, London, England, U.K.	
35	Win	28–5–2	Ernie Godwin	PTS	6	Dec 18, 1909	Wonderland, Whitechapel Road, Mile End, London, England, U.K.	
34	Loss	27–5–2	Johnny Hughes	PTS	6	Dec 11, 1909	Canterbury Theatre of Varieties, Lambeth, London, England, U.K.	
33	Win	27–4–2	Bill Kyne	PTS	6	Dec 6, 1909	King's Hall, London Road, Southwark, London, England, U.K.	
32	Win	26–4–2	Ted Timmins	PTS	6	Oct 8, 1909	Queens Hall, Birmingham, West Midlands, England, U.K.	
31	Win	25–4–2	Albert Dabbs	PTS	6	Oct 4, 1909	Kings Hall, Southwark, London, England, U.K.	
30	Win	24–4–2	Frank Exall	KO	2 (6)	Sep 20, 1909	Kings Hall, Southwark, London, England, U.K.	
29	Loss	23–4–2	Bill Kyne	PTS	6	Jun 5, 1909	Wonderland, Whitechapel Road, Mile End, London, England, U.K.	
28	Win	23–3–2	Albert Cocksedge	PTS	10	Mar 23, 1909	Leicester, Leicestershire, England, U.K.	
27	Win	22–3–2	Jack Wise	PTS	6	Mar 15, 1909	Britannia Theatre, Hoxton, London, England, U.K.	
26	Win	21–3–2	Albert Cocksedge	PTS	15	Feb 8, 1909	National Sporting Club, Covent Garden, London, England, U.K.	Won vacant NSC British light-flyweight title
25	Loss	20–3–2	Albert Cocksedge	PTS	6	Jan 9, 1909	Wonderland, Whitechapel Road, Mile End, London, England, U.K.	
24	Win	20–2–2	George Hearne	PTS	6	Dec 21, 1908	Wonderland, Whitechapel Road, Mile End, London, England, U.K.	
23	Win	19–2–2	Jack Morris	PTS	6	Nov 30, 1908	Wonderland, Whitechapel Road, Mile End, London, England, U.K.	
22	Win	18–2–2	Frank Morcombe	PTS	10	Oct 30, 1908	Wonderland, Whitechapel Road, Mile End, London, England, U.K.	
21	Win	17–2–2	Harry Lyons	PTS	6	Sep 1, 1908	London, England, U.K.	Date unknown
20	Win	16–2–2	Jack Fox	PTS	6	Jul 4, 1908	Wonderland, Whitechapel Road, Mile End, London, England, U.K.	
19	Loss	15–2–2	Charlie Dew	PTS	10	May 25, 1908	National Sporting Club, Covent Garden, London, England, U.K.	
18	Draw	15–1–2	Albert Cocksedge	PTS	6	Apr 27, 1908	Wonderland, Whitechapel Road, Mile End, London, England, U.K.	
17	Win	15–1–1	Curley Osborne	PTS	6	Apr 2, 1908	St. George's Hall, Westminster, London, England, U.K.	
16	Draw	14–1–1	Frank Exall	PTS	6	Mar 21, 1908	Star Music Hall, Bermondsey, London, England, U.K.	
15	Win	14–1	Young Hearley	RTD	2 (6)	Mar 9, 1908	National Sporting Club, Covent Garden, London, England, U.K.	
14	Win	13–1	Drummer Le Hay	PTS	6	Feb 15, 1908	Wonderland, Whitechapel Road, Mile End, London, England, U.K.	
13	Win	12–1	Frank Morcombe	PTS	6	Feb 1, 1908	Wonderland, Whitechapel Road, Mile End, London, England, U.K.	
12	Win	11–1	Jim Glover	PTS	6	Jan 25, 1908	Wonderland, Whitechapel Road, Mile End, London, England, U.K.	
11	Win	10–1	Frank Morcombe	PTS	6	Jan 20, 1908	Wonderland, Whitechapel Road, Mile End, London, England, U.K.	
10	Loss	9–1	Charlie Dew	PTS	10	Jan 13, 1908	National Sporting Club, Covent Garden, London, England, U.K.	
9	Win	9–0	Arthur Jones	TKO	3 (6)	Jan 4, 1908	Wonderland, Whitechapel Road, Mile End, London, England, U.K.	
8	Win	8–0	Charlie Dew	PTS	6	Dec 14, 1907	Wonderland, Whitechapel Road, Mile End, London, England, U.K.	
7	Win	7–0	Curley Osborne	PTS	6	Nov 30, 1907	Wonderland, Whitechapel Road, Mile End, London, England, U.K.	
6	Win	6–0	Drummer Le Hay	PTS	6	Nov 27, 1907	Marlborough Lines Gymnasium, Aldershot, Hampshire, England, U.K.	
5	Win	5–0	Curley Osborne	PTS	6	Nov 16, 1907	Wonderland, Whitechapel Road, Mile End, London, England, U.K.	
4	Win	4–0	Curley Osborne	PTS	6	May 25, 1907	Wonderland, Whitechapel Road, Mile End, London, England, U.K.	
3	Win	3–0	Drummer Le Hay	PTS	6	Apr 13, 1907	Wonderland, Whitechapel Road, Mile End, London, England, U.K.	
2	Win	2–0	Drummer Le Hay	PTS	6	Mar 30, 1907	Wonderland, Whitechapel Road, Mile End, London, England, U.K.	
1	Win	1–0	Curley Osborne	PTS	6	Mar 23, 1907	Wonderland, Whitechapel Road Matinee session, Mile End, London, England, U.K.	

=== Unofficial record ===
101 fights	78 wins	17 losses
By knockout	11	8
By decision	66	9
By disqualification	1	0
Draws	6	

Record with the inclusion of newspaper decisions in the win/loss/draw column.

No.	Result	Record	Opponent	Type	Round	Date	Location	Notes
101	Win	78–17–6	Johnny Marshall	TKO	11 (15)	Dec 26, 1918	Assembly Rooms, Surbiton, London, England, U.K.	
100	Win	77–17–6	Jerry Lyons	RTD	9 (10)	Oct 12, 1918	Market Hall, Redhill, London, England, U.K.	
99	Win	76–17–6	Billy Garrard	PTS	6	Sep 17, 1918	Botanic Gardens, Regenets Park, London, England, U.K.	
98	Win	75–17–6	Sid Whatley	PTS	10	Apr 22, 1918	National Sporting Club, Covent Garden, London, England, U.K.	
97	Loss	74–17–6	Joe Conn	RTD	4 (20)	Oct 15, 1917	The Ring, Blackfriars Road, Southwark, London, England, U.K.	
96	Loss	74–16–6	Tommy Noble	TKO	5 (20)	Apr 23, 1917	The Ring, Blackfriars Road, Southwark, London, England, U.K.	
95	Win	74–15–6	Billy Affleck	TKO	13 (20)	Feb 12, 1917	National Sporting Club, Covent Garden, London, England, U.K.	
94	Loss	73–15–6	George Clark	PTS	20	Jan 29, 1917	The Ring, Blackfriars Road, Southwark, London, England, U.K.	
93	Win	73–14–6	Sid Whatley	KO	16 (20)	Jan 8, 1917	The Ring, Blackfriars Road, Southwark, London, England, U.K.	
92	Win	72–14–6	Jack Josephs	PTS	15	Jun 22, 1916	Liverpool Stadium, Pudsey Street, Liverpool, Merseyside, England, U.K.	
91	Win	71–14–6	Ivor Day	PTS	15	Jun 1, 1916	Liverpool Stadium, Pudsey Street, Liverpool, Merseyside, England, U.K.	
90	Win	70–14–6	Dido Gains	PTS	20	May 20, 1916	The Ring, Blackfriars Road, Southwark, London, England, U.K.	
89	Loss	69–14–6	Jimmy Wilde	KO	3 (15)	Mar 27, 1916	Hoxton Baths, Hoxton, London, England, U.K.	
88	Win	69–13–6	Sid Shields	PTS	15	Feb 17, 1916	Pitfield Street Baths, Hoxton, London, England, U.K.	
87	Loss	68–13–6	Jimmy Wilde	TKO	8 (15)	Dec 20, 1915	National Sporting Club, Covent Garden, London, England, U.K.	
86	Draw	68–12–6	Johnny Best	PTS	20	May 3, 1915	Victoria AC, Glasgow, Scotland, U.K.	
85	Draw	68–12–5	Johnny Best	PTS	20	Mar 20, 1915	West London Stadium, Marylebone, London, England, U.K.	
84	Win	68–12–4	Young Riley	PTS	6	Mar 17, 1915	Plymouth, Devon, England, U.K.	
83	Loss	67–12–4	Joe Symonds	RTD	4 (20)	Feb 15, 1915	New Cross Baths, New Cross, London, England, U.K.	
82	Win	67–11–4	Johnny Marshall	DQ	4 (20)	Dec 19, 1914	Victoria AC, Glasgow, Scotland, U.K.	
81	Loss	66–11–4	Jimmy Wilde	TKO	9 (15)	Dec 3, 1914	Liverpool Stadium, Pudsey Street, Liverpool, Merseyside, England, U.K.	For British 112lbs title claim
80	Win	66–10–4	Billy Young Rowlands	PTS	20	Oct 26, 1914	The Ring, Blackfriars Road, Southwark, London, England, U.K.	
79	Loss	65–10–4	Alf Wye	PTS	20	Mar 23, 1914	The Ring, Blackfriars Road, Southwark, London, England, U.K.	
78	Win	65–9–4	Alf Wye	PTS	20	Feb 16, 1914	The Ring, Blackfriars Road, Southwark, London, England, U.K.	
77	Loss	64–9–4	Alf Wye	PTS	15	Nov 3, 1913	National Sporting Club, Covent Garden, London, England, U.K.	
76	Loss	64–8–4	Charles Ledoux	RTD	6 (20)	Oct 24, 1913	Élysée Montmartre, Paris, Paris, France	
75	Win	64–7–4	Ike Young Bradley	PTS	10	Oct 9, 1913	Liverpool Stadium, Pudsey Street, Liverpool, Merseyside, England, U.K.	
74	Loss	63–7–4	Bill Ladbury	RTD	11 (20)	Jun 2, 1913	The Ring, Blackfriars Road, Southwark, London, England, U.K.	Lost IBU, Lonsdale, and world flyweight titles
73	Win	63–6–4	Joe Symonds	PTS	15	May 16, 1913	Cosmopolitan Gymnasium, Plymouth, Devon, England, U.K.	
72	Win	62–6–4	Eugène Criqui	UD	20	Apr 11, 1913	Élysée Montmartre, Paris, Paris, France	Retained IBU, Lonsdale, and world flyweight titles
71	Win	61–6–4	Charlie Ward	PTS	10	Mar 28, 1913	Canterbury Music Hall, Lambeth, London, England, U.K.	
70	Win	60–6–4	Danny Elliott	PTS	8	Mar 25, 1913	Gladstone Hall, Windsor Liberal Club, Windsor, Berkshire, England, U.K.	
69	Win	59–6–4	Kid Hogan	PTS	6	Mar 15, 1913	The Dome, Brighton, Sussex, England, U.K.	
68	Win	58–6–4	Sam Kellar	PTS	20	Feb 24, 1913	The Ring, Blackfriars Road, Southwark, London, England, U.K.	
67	Win	57–6–4	Charlie Ward	PTS	6	Feb 14, 1913	Chandos Hall, Stratford, London, England, U.K.	
66	Win	56–6–4	Albert Bouzonnie	PTS	10	Feb 12, 1913	Cirque de Paris, Paris, Paris, France	
65	Win	55–6–4	Danny Elliott	PTS	6	Jan 23, 1913	Stratford, London, England, U.K.	
64	Win	54–6–4	Albert Bouzonnie	PTS	10	Dec 20, 1912	The King's Hall, London Road, Walworth, London, England, U.K.	
63	Win	53–6–4	Curley Walker	PTS	20	Sep 19, 1912	The Ring, Blackfriars Road, Southwark, London, England, U.K.	
62	Draw	52–6–4	Joseph "Louisiana" Biderberg	NWS	6	Feb 24, 1912	National A.C., Philadelphia, Pennsylvania, U.S.	
61	Win	52–6–3	Joe Wilson	PTS	20	Dec 4, 1911	National Sporting Club, Covent Garden, London, England, U.K.	Won inaugural Lonsdale and vacant world flyweight titles
60	Win	51–6–3	Louis Ruddick	PTS	20	Oct 19, 1911	Liverpool Stadium, Pudsey Street, Liverpool, Merseyside, England, U.K.	
59	Win	50–6–3	Georges Gaillard	PTS	10	Oct 2, 1911	Empress Rink, Earl's Court, London, England, U.K.	
58	Win	49–6–3	Stoker Bill Hoskyne	PTS	20	Sep 25, 1911	The Ring, Blackfriars Road, Southwark, London, England, U.K.	
57	Win	48–6–3	Kid Hogan	KO	8 (10)	Aug 4, 1911	Engineers Drill Hall, Portsmouth, Hampshire, England, U.K.	
56	Win	47–6–3	Kid Hogan	PTS	10	Mar 20, 1911	The Ring, Blackfriars Road Matinee, Southwark, London, England, U.K.	
55	Win	46–6–3	Kid Hogan	PTS	6	Mar 8, 1911	Olympia Annexe, Kensington, London, England, U.K.	
54	Win	45–6–3	George Peters	PTS	15	Jan 30, 1911	Manor Place Baths, Walworth, London, England, U.K.	Claimed vacant British 112lbs title
53	Win	44–6–3	Kid Hogan	KO	7 (20)	Jan 25, 1911	Free Trade Hall, Leicester, Leicestershire, England, U.K.	
52	Win	43–6–3	Stoker Bill Hoskyne	PTS	6	Jan 11, 1911	Annexe Olympia, Kensington, London, England, U.K.	
51	Win	42–6–3	Bob Finch	KO	2 (10)	Dec 26, 1910	The Ring, Blackfriars Road, Southwark, London, England, U.K.	
50	Win	41–6–3	Alex Lafferty	PTS	20	Dec 5, 1910	Victoria AC, Glasgow, Scotland, U.K.	
49	Win	40–6–3	George Hearne	PTS	6	Nov 16, 1910	King's Hall, London Road, Southwark, London, England, U.K.	
48	Win	39–6–3	Bert Moughton	PTS	10	Nov 12, 1910	The Ring, Blackfriars Road, Southwark, London, England, U.K.	
47	Loss	38–6–3	Paddy Carroll	PTS	20	Nov 10, 1910	Liverpool Arena, Liverpool, Merseyside, England, U.K.	
46	Win	38–5–3	Harry Prosser	PTS	6	Oct 19, 1910	King's Hall, London Road, Southwark, London, England, U.K.	
45	Win	37–5–3	Ginger Osborne	RTD	9 (10)	Oct 10, 1910	The Ring, Blackfriars Road, Southwark, London, England, U.K.	
44	Win	36–5–3	Bob Finch	PTS	6	Oct 3, 1910	The Empire, Holborn, London, England, U.K.	
43	Win	35–5–3	Kid Logan	PTS	6	Sep 1, 1910	London, England, U.K.	Date unknown
42	Win	34–5–3	Paddy Carroll	PTS	10	Jun 6, 1910	King's Hall, London Road, Southwark, London, England, U.K.	
41	Draw	33–5–3	Albert Cocksedge	PTS	20	Feb 23, 1910	Free Trade Hall, Leicester, Leicestershire, England, U.K.	
40	Win	33–5–2	Paddy Carroll	PTS	20	Feb 17, 1910	International A.C., Liverpool, Merseyside, England, U.K.	
39	Win	32–5–2	Joe Shear	PTS	10	Jan 27, 1910	King's Hall, London Road, Southwark, London, England, U.K.	
38	Win	31–5–2	Bill Kyne	PTS	6	Jan 17, 1910	The Empire, Holborn, London, England, U.K.	
37	Win	30–5–2	Jim Butler	PTS	20	Jan 10, 1910	Drill Hall, Birkenhead, Merseyside, England, U.K.	
36	Win	29–5–2	Bill Kyne	PTS	6	Dec 20, 1909	National Sporting Club, Covent Garden, London, England, U.K.	
35	Win	28–5–2	Ernie Godwin	PTS	6	Dec 18, 1909	Wonderland, Whitechapel Road, Mile End, London, England, U.K.	
34	Loss	27–5–2	Johnny Hughes	PTS	6	Dec 11, 1909	Canterbury Theatre of Varieties, Lambeth, London, England, U.K.	
33	Win	27–4–2	Bill Kyne	PTS	6	Dec 6, 1909	King's Hall, London Road, Southwark, London, England, U.K.	
32	Win	26–4–2	Ted Timmins	PTS	6	Oct 8, 1909	Queens Hall, Birmingham, West Midlands, England, U.K.	
31	Win	25–4–2	Albert Dabbs	PTS	6	Oct 4, 1909	Kings Hall, Southwark, London, England, U.K.	
30	Win	24–4–2	Frank Exall	KO	2 (6)	Sep 20, 1909	Kings Hall, Southwark, London, England, U.K.	
29	Loss	23–4–2	Bill Kyne	PTS	6	Jun 5, 1909	Wonderland, Whitechapel Road, Mile End, London, England, U.K.	
28	Win	23–3–2	Albert Cocksedge	PTS	10	Mar 23, 1909	Leicester, Leicestershire, England, U.K.	
27	Win	22–3–2	Jack Wise	PTS	6	Mar 15, 1909	Britannia Theatre, Hoxton, London, England, U.K.	
26	Win	21–3–2	Albert Cocksedge	PTS	15	Feb 8, 1909	National Sporting Club, Covent Garden, London, England, U.K.	Won vacant NSC British light-flyweight title
25	Loss	20–3–2	Albert Cocksedge	PTS	6	Jan 9, 1909	Wonderland, Whitechapel Road, Mile End, London, England, U.K.	
24	Win	20–2–2	George Hearne	PTS	6	Dec 21, 1908	Wonderland, Whitechapel Road, Mile End, London, England, U.K.	
23	Win	19–2–2	Jack Morris	PTS	6	Nov 30, 1908	Wonderland, Whitechapel Road, Mile End, London, England, U.K.	
22	Win	18–2–2	Frank Morcombe	PTS	10	Oct 30, 1908	Wonderland, Whitechapel Road, Mile End, London, England, U.K.	
21	Win	17–2–2	Harry Lyons	PTS	6	Sep 1, 1908	London, England, U.K.	Date unknown
20	Win	16–2–2	Jack Fox	PTS	6	Jul 4, 1908	Wonderland, Whitechapel Road, Mile End, London, England, U.K.	
19	Loss	15–2–2	Charlie Dew	PTS	10	May 25, 1908	National Sporting Club, Covent Garden, London, England, U.K.	
18	Draw	15–1–2	Albert Cocksedge	PTS	6	Apr 27, 1908	Wonderland, Whitechapel Road, Mile End, London, England, U.K.	
17	Win	15–1–1	Curley Osborne	PTS	6	Apr 2, 1908	St. George's Hall, Westminster, London, England, U.K.	
16	Draw	14–1–1	Frank Exall	PTS	6	Mar 21, 1908	Star Music Hall, Bermondsey, London, England, U.K.	
15	Win	14–1	Young Hearley	RTD	2 (6)	Mar 9, 1908	National Sporting Club, Covent Garden, London, England, U.K.	
14	Win	13–1	Drummer Le Hay	PTS	6	Feb 15, 1908	Wonderland, Whitechapel Road, Mile End, London, England, U.K.	
13	Win	12–1	Frank Morcombe	PTS	6	Feb 1, 1908	Wonderland, Whitechapel Road, Mile End, London, England, U.K.	
12	Win	11–1	Jim Glover	PTS	6	Jan 25, 1908	Wonderland, Whitechapel Road, Mile End, London, England, U.K.	
11	Win	10–1	Frank Morcombe	PTS	6	Jan 20, 1908	Wonderland, Whitechapel Road, Mile End, London, England, U.K.	
10	Loss	9–1	Charlie Dew	PTS	10	Jan 13, 1908	National Sporting Club, Covent Garden, London, England, U.K.	
9	Win	9–0	Arthur Jones	TKO	3 (6)	Jan 4, 1908	Wonderland, Whitechapel Road, Mile End, London, England, U.K.	
8	Win	8–0	Charlie Dew	PTS	6	Dec 14, 1907	Wonderland, Whitechapel Road, Mile End, London, England, U.K.	
7	Win	7–0	Curley Osborne	PTS	6	Nov 30, 1907	Wonderland, Whitechapel Road, Mile End, London, England, U.K.	
6	Win	6–0	Drummer Le Hay	PTS	6	Nov 27, 1907	Marlborough Lines Gymnasium, Aldershot, Hampshire, England, U.K.	
5	Win	5–0	Curley Osborne	PTS	6	Nov 16, 1907	Wonderland, Whitechapel Road, Mile End, London, England, U.K.	
4	Win	4–0	Curley Osborne	PTS	6	May 25, 1907	Wonderland, Whitechapel Road, Mile End, London, England, U.K.	
3	Win	3–0	Drummer Le Hay	PTS	6	Apr 13, 1907	Wonderland, Whitechapel Road, Mile End, London, England, U.K.	
2	Win	2–0	Drummer Le Hay	PTS	6	Mar 30, 1907	Wonderland, Whitechapel Road, Mile End, London, England, U.K.	
1	Win	1–0	Curley Osborne	PTS	6	Mar 23, 1907	Wonderland, Whitechapel Road Matinee session, Mile End, London, England, U.K.	

== See also ==
- List of British flyweight boxing champions

== Sources ==
- Maurice Golesworthy, Encyclopaedia of Boxing (Eighth Edition) (1988), Robert Hale Limited, ISBN 0-7090-3323-0

Minor world boxing titles
New title	IBU flyweight champion April 11 – June 2, 1913	Succeeded by Bill Ladbury
