= Albert Cocksedge =

Personal information
- Nationality: British
- Born: 30 January 1884 Leicester, England
- Died: 25 January 1928 (aged 43) Leicester, England
- Weight: Bantamweight/flyweight

Boxing career

Albert Cocksedge (30 January 1884 – 25 January 1928), known in the early years of his career as Young Cocksedge, was a British boxer of the early 20th century, who held English titles at various weights, and fought for a world title, in the era before weights were standardised, fighting at weights between 98 and 112lbs.

== Career ==
Born in Leicester in 1884, Cocksedge won his first title in 1901, knocking out Young Tiddler in December that year to win the English 7-stone title. In October 1904 he fought a draw against Frank Morcombe for the latter's English 106lbs title, winning a rematch the following month to take the title. In December he was beaten by the Australian Tibby Watson, who would win the 108lbs world title the following month. In January 1905 he lost in a fight for the 7st 8lbs championship belt of the world to Johnny Hughes, a man who had also beaten him eight months earlier. In October 1906 he beat Charlie Dew on points to take the English 104lbs title, successfully defending against Dew two months later but losing it to Bert Chatterton in February 1907. He regained it in June that year, stopping Chatterton in the fourth round. In October 1907 he beat Charlie Exall for the 106lbs title, and in February 1908 beat Harry McDermott on points for the 108lbs title. In April 1908 he fought a draw with Sid Smith before successfully defending his 106lbs title two months later against Harry Badger. On 7 December 1908 he beat Jack Guyon on points at the National Sporting Club. In January 1909 he beat Smith and Watson, before losing his 108lbs title to Smith in February. He fought Smith again in March, also ending as loser. In September 1909 he fought a draw against Sam Kellar for the English 112lbs title. The two met again in October, with referee Tom Gamble stopping the fight in the fourth round, deciding neither man was trying. In April 1910 he beat McDermott on points over 20 rounds to take the English 110lbs title, losing it two months later to Bill Kyne. In October 1911 he challenged Bill Ladbury for the 112lbs title, Ladbury stopping him in the seventh round.

Cocksedge continued to fight regularly until around 1914, and continued in both competitive and exhibition bouts, having possibly his final competitive fight in 1922 (beating Billy Shephard), and an exhibition against Jimmy Wilde a few years later.

In his later years he was resident at 1, Paradise Lane in Leicester, and worked as a shoe scourer.

Cocksedge was walking to a whist drive in Leicester on 25 January 1928, when he was knocked down and killed by an RAF car. He was 43.
