= Curley Walker =

English boxer

Personal information
- Nationality: British
- Born: 4 February 1894 Lambeth, London, England
- Died: 1973
- Weight: Flyweight, bantamweight, featherweight

Boxing career

Boxing record
- Total fights: 106
- Wins: 55
- Win by KO: 12
- Losses: 41
- Draws: 10

Curley Walker (4 February 1894 – 1973) was a British boxer who was British bantamweight champion between 1914 and 1915.

== Career ==
Born in Bermondsey and based in Bermondsey, Cornelius "Curley" Walker made his professional debut in August 1909. In his first three years as a pro he had around 30 fights, losing only to Young Major, Louis Ruddick, and Jimmy Berry. In September 1912 he unsuccessfully challenged for Sid Smith's British flyweight title, losing on points over 20 rounds.

He moved up to bantamweight and in April 1914 faced Digger Stanley in a fight for the British title that had been postponed from January after Stanley broke his foot. Stanley was disqualified in the thirteenth round for persistent holding, giving Walker the title. Two months later he lost to former European champion Charles Ledoux and in December drew with Joe Fox.

He was due to defend his title against Berry in November 1915 but no longer able to make bantamweight he relinquished his title in October and moved up to featherweight. He won all four of his fights that year, but in 1916 lost to Mike Honeyman (disqualified for butting) and Johnny McIntyre. In October 1916 he beat Bob Cotton in a British featherweight title eliminator but didn't go on to challenge for the title.

From 1917 onwards his career went into decline. He won a few fights against less experienced opponents but in an 18-month period between 1917 and 1919 he won only one of eight fights. Between December 1920 and January 1922 he lost eleven straight fights. He continued until April 1923, never repeating his earlier success.

Walker served as a private in the British Army during World War I.
