= Joe Symonds =

British boxer (1894–1953)

Personal information
- Nickname: Young Symonds
- Nationality: British
- Born: Hubert Toms; 28 December 1894 Plymouth, England
- Died: 4 March 1953 (aged 58) Plymouth, England
- Height: 5 ft 1.5 in (156 cm)
- Weight: Flyweight; Bantamweight; Featherweight; Super featherweight; Lightweight

Boxing career

Boxing record
- Total fights: 140
- Wins: 98
- Win by KO: 43
- Losses: 28
- Draws: 12
- No contests: 2

Hubert Toms (28 December 1894 – 4 March 1953), better known as Joe Symonds, Young Joe Symonds, or Young Symonds, was a British professional boxer who competed from 1910 to 1924. He held the IBU world and National Sporting Club’s British flyweight titles in 1915, as well as the EBU flyweight title in 1914.

== Career ==
Born in Plymouth in 1894, Joe Symonds made his professional debut in October 1910 with a points win over Nipper Riley. By November 1912, he had built up a record of 20 wins, 3 draws and 2 losses against inexperienced opponents. In December 1912, he beat his first opponent with any real professional experience when Young Joseph's Nipper (who had 38 wins to his name) retired in the ninth round. He went on to beat Bill Kyne, but lost via disqualification in March 1913 to future World champion Percy Jones, who beat him again in both June and September of that year.

Between October 1913 and April 1914, Symonds was unbeaten, including a drawn fight against former World champion Bill Ladbury. In May 1914, he faced Jones again, taking his European flyweight title after Jones retired in the eighteenth round. In November, he faced Jimmy Wilde in an eliminator for the British flyweight title, losing on points.

He beat Ladbury twice in 1915, and in October faced Tancy Lee at the National Sporting Club for the British and IBU World flyweight titles; he stopped Lee in the eighteenth round to take both titles. He defended them both against Wilde in February 1916; Symonds retired in the twelfth round.

Symonds moved up to bantamweight, and in September 1916 drew with Louis Ruddick in a British title eliminator. In June 1917, he challenged for Joe Fox's British title, losing after being stopped in the eighteenth round. When Fox vacated the title in 1918, Symonds got another chance to win it when he faced Tommy Noble, but lost on points.

In 1920, Symonds travelled to Australia, where he stayed until returning in September 1921, having 14 fights there including a win over former Australian bantamweight champion Vince Blackburn. After losing five times in six fights he returned to England, and went on to lose three of his next four fights, including a British title eliminator against Billy Eynon. In 1922, he travelled to the United States where he fought Tommy Gerrard. He continued to box until October 1924, his final fight ending in a seventh round knockout at the hands of former European and British Empire champion Bugler Harry Lake.

Symonds went on to become a boxing referee.

Minor world boxing titles
Vacant Title last held by Tancy Lee	IBU flyweight champion October 18, 1915 – February 14, 1916	Succeeded by Jimmy Wilde
