= Tancy Lee =

Scottish boxer (1882–1941)

Personal information
- Nationality: British
- Born: James Lee; 31 January 1882 Leith, Scotland
- Died: 5 February 1941 (aged 59) Leith, Scotland
- Height: 5 ft 2 in (1.57 m)
- Weight: Flyweight; Bantamweight; Featherweight; Lightweight

Boxing career

Boxing record
- Total fights: 49
- Wins: 37
- Win by KO: 24
- Losses: 10
- Draws: 2

James "Tancy" Lee (31 January 1882 – 5 February 1941) was a Scottish professional boxer who competed from 1906 to 1926. He held the IBU world, EBU European and the National Sporting Club’s British flyweight titles in 1915, becoming the first Scot to hold a British title.

== Career ==
=== Early career ===
Born in Leith in 1882, Lee had his first fights as an amateur in 1906. In 1910 he won the ABA bantamweight championship, but was stripped of the title after it was discovered that he had infringed the amateur boxing laws. Undefeated as a professional by 1911 he suffered his first loss when he was stopped in the thirteenth round by Alex Lafferty in a contest for the Scottish bantamweight title. He won the Scottish flyweight title three years later when he beat Dan McGrady (who later changed his name to MacGrady).

=== British, European, and World title fights ===
After beating Tommy Harrison in an eliminator he was to face Percy Jones in October 1914 for the latter's British and World flyweight titles but Jones failed to make the weight; The fight went ahead as a non-title catch-weight fight with Lee stopping Jones in the 14th round.

In January 1915 he faced Jimmy Wilde, at the time unbeaten in over 90 fights (according to some sources 103), for the vacant British, European, and IBU World titles at the National Sporting Club, stopping him in the 17th round to become triple champion. He lost the British and World titles nine months later to Joe "Young" Symonds.

In February 1916 he beat Johnny Best to take the Scottish bantamweight title, and four months later faced Wilde for the British, European, and World flyweight titles, Wilde stopping him in the 11th round.

In April 1916 he temporarily lost his flyweight title to Young Symonds but regained the title in a rematch a month later when he won in the 17th round.

In December 1916 he successfully defended his Scottish bantamweight title against Lafferty and then moved up to featherweight. In November 1917 he knocked Charlie Hardcastle in the fourth round to become British featherweight champion. Although he lost his next three fights he successfully defended his British title in October 1918 against Joe Conn, and again in February 1919 against Danny Morgan to win the Lonsdale Belt outright.

In December 1919 he challenged Louis de Ponthieu for the vacant European featherweight title at the Cirque de Paris, but was stopped in the 17th round. Having relinquished the British title he fought for it again in October 1920, but retired in the 19th round against defending champion Mike Honeyman. After losing to Auguste Grassi in March 1921 he retired from boxing, although he fought in a three-round exhibition bout in 1922, and made a comeback in 1926, at the age of 44, when he drew with Johnny Seeley.

=== Retirement and death ===
After retiring from the ring Lee became a bookmaker, and also a boxing trainer and manager, having co-founded the Leith Victoria Club in 1919, and training fighters such as Johnny Hill, Alex Ireland, Jim Rolland, and Lee's nephews George McKenzie and James McKenzie, both Olympic medallists, George also winning the British featherweight title.

In April 1930 a testimonial tournament was held in his honour in Waverley Market, Edinburgh. As the first outright winner of the Lonsdale Belt to reach the age of 50, he became in 1932 the first to receive a £1 per week pension from the National Sporting Club.

Tancy Lee died on 5 February 1941, aged 59, after being hit by a bus in Duncan Place, and was buried at Seafield Cemetery in Edinburgh. He was survived by his widow Harriett (née Mears) and three daughters. His wife sued the Edinburgh Corporation, owners of the bus, but the action was unsuccessful.

Lee was inducted into the Scottish Boxing Hall of Fame in September 2008, in a ceremony attended by his 94-year-old daughter.

== Title fights ==
Result	Opponent	Type	Rd., Time	Date	Location	Notes
Loss	(United Kingdom) Mike Honeyman	RTD	19 (20)	1920-10-25	(United Kingdom) National Sporting Club, London	Lost challenge for British Featherweight title
Loss	(France) Louis De Ponthieu	KO	17 (20)	1919-12-24	Cirque de Paris, Paris, France	Lost challenge for European Featherweight title
Win	(United Kingdom) Danny Morgan	PTS	(20)	1919-02-24	(United Kingdom) National Sporting Club, London	Retained British Featherweight title
Win	(United Kingdom) Joe Conn	KO	17 (20)	1918-10-21	(United Kingdom) National Sporting Club, London	Retained British Featherweight title
Win	(United Kingdom) Charlie Hardcastle	KO	4 (20)	1917-11-05	(United Kingdom) National Sporting Club, London	Won British Featherweight title
Win	(Scotland) Johnny Lafferty	RTD	14 (20)	1916-12-14	(United Kingdom) Liverpool Stadium, Liverpool	Won Scottish Bantamweight title
Loss	(United Kingdom) Jimmy Wilde	TKO	11 (20)	1916-06-26	(United Kingdom) National Sporting Club, London	Lost challenge for British flyweight title & IBU World flyweight title, lost European flyweight title
Win	(Scotland) Johnny Best	KO	11 (20)	1916-02-17	(United Kingdom) Liverpool Stadium, Liverpool	Won Scottish Bantamweight title
Loss	(United Kingdom) Joe Symonds	TKO	16 (20)	1915-10-18	(United Kingdom) National Sporting Club, London	Lost British flyweight title & IBU World flyweight title
Win	(United Kingdom) Jimmy Wilde	TKO	17 (20)	1915-01-25	(United Kingdom) National Sporting Club, London	Won British flyweight title, European flyweight title, & IBU World flyweight title,
Win	(Scotland) Dan McGrady	TKO	12 (20)	1914-03-09	(United Kingdom) National AC, Glasgow	Won Scottish flyweight title
Loss	(Scotland) Alex Lafferty	TKO	13 (15)	1911-04-13	(United Kingdom) Olympia, Edinburgh	Lost challenge for Scottish bantamweight title

Minor world boxing titles
Vacant Title last held by Percy Jones	IBU flyweight champion January 25 – October 18, 1915	Succeeded by Joe Symonds
