= Harry Corbett (boxer) =

English boxer

Personal information
- Nationality: British
- Born: Henry William Coleman; 13 January 1904 London, England
- Died: 6 May 1957 (aged 53) London, England
- Weight: Bantamweight, featherweight, lightweight

Boxing career

Boxing record
- Total fights: 226
- Wins: 146
- Win by KO: 51
- Losses: 53
- Draws: 24
- No contests: 3

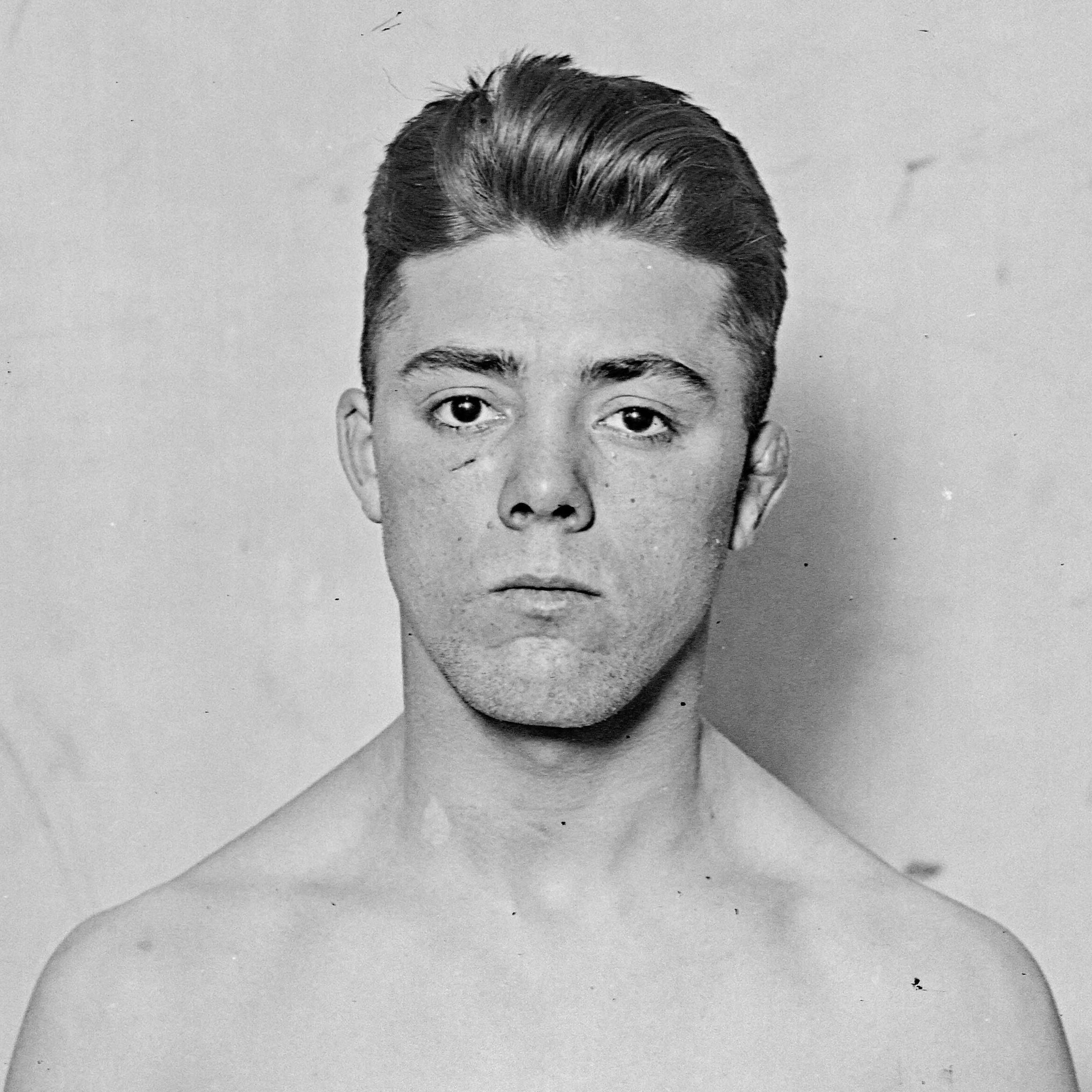
British lightweight boxer Henry William Coleman aka Harry Corbet in June 1926

Henry William Coleman (13 January 1904 – 6 May 1957), better known as Harry Corbett, was an English boxer who was British featherweight champion between 1928 and 1929, and also fought for titles at bantamweight and lightweight.

== Career ==
From Bethnal Green, Coleman began his professional career in September 1921, initially at bantamweight and under the name 'Young Corbett' (in tribute to his hero, Gentleman Jim Corbett, later settling on 'Harry Corbett'), beating Barney Brown and Jack Landon on consecutive days. His first eight fights included four wins and four defeats (one to Harry Mason). He won his next six fight, before losing in January 1922 to Johnny Murton.

By the end of 1923 he had built up a record of 55 wins, 10 defeats, 7 losses, and 1 no contest. He started 1924 with losses to George "Kid" Nicholson, Billy Hindley, and Young George Spiers, won his next four, before losing a points decision in May to Johnny Cuthbert. He won his next nine fights, including wins over Johnny Brown, Frankie Ash, and Victor Ferrand.

In February 1925 he challenged for Brown's British, Commonwealth, and European bantamweight titles at the National Sporting Club. His challenge was unsuccessful, retiring in the 16th round. He had 15 further fights that year, beating Bugler Harry Lake, Cuthbert, Battling van Dijk, and French bantamweight champion André Routis, and losing to French lightweight champion Jules Alverel.

Now fighting at featherweight, Corbett beat Johnny Britton in January 1926 in a final eliminator for the British title. He followed this with a points win over Jack Kid Berg in February. In March he faced defending champion Johnny Curley at the N.S.C., losing on points. He drew his next three fights, against Berg, Edouard Mascart, and van Dijk, before beating Danish champion Knud Larsen in July. He had less success in the latter half of the year, losing to Berg, Larsen, Mascart, Cuthbert (twice), and Belgian champion François Sybille.

He lost only one fight in 1927 (on a disqualification to Young Clancy), beating Sam Steward twice, and also defeating van Dijk and European bantamweight champion Henri Scillie.

In March 1928 Corbett challenged Cuthbert for the British featherweight title at the N.S.C., the last time the belt was contested over 20 scheduled rounds. Corbett took a points verdict to become British champion. He lost to Panama Al Brown in December, and ended the year with a stoppage of Jack Kirby.

Corbett defended his title against Cuthbert in March 1929, the fight ending in a draw. They met again two months later at Olympia, Cuthbert getting the points verdict to regain the title. Corbett subsequently travelled to Australia for a series of fights.

Corbett moved up again in weight, and in March 1930 stopped Alf Howard at Liverpool Stadium in an eliminator for the British lightweight title, but his final eliminator against Gorge Rose was cancelled after Corbett refused to comply with the BBBofC's conditions for the fight. In September he lost to Alf Mancini and in December fought a draw with Len "Tiger" Smith.

He fought a draw with Haydn Williams over 15 rounds in January 1931, and only three days later lost on points to Cleto Locatelli. He beat Howard in March and despite losing seven of eight fights later that year, met Bep van Klaveren in October for the European lightweight title, van Klaveren winning on points.

Corbett was out of the ring for over a year between 1932 and 1933 after losing the sight in his left eye, and although his career had seemed to be over he continued fighting until 1936.

A chain smoker all his adult life, Corbett died on 6 May 1957 in Victoria Park Chest Hospital.

His brother, Dick Corbett, was also a successful boxer.
