= André Routis =

French boxer

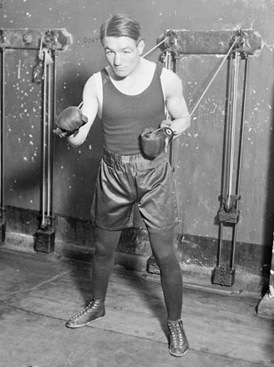

Personal information
- Nationality: French
- Born: André Routis; July 16, 1900 Bordeaux, France
- Died: July 16, 1969 (aged 69)
- Height: 5 ft 4 in (1.63 m)
- Weight: Bantamweight; Featherweight

Boxing career

Boxing record
- Total fights: 88
- Wins: 56
- Win by KO: 13
- Losses: 24
- Draws: 7
- No contests: 1

André Routis (July 16, 1900 – July 16, 1969) was a French professional boxer. He fought 86 times between 1919 and 1929; winning 54 (12 by knockout), losing 25 and drawing 7. After a victory over Tony Canzoneri he held the Undisputed Featherweight title from 1928 to 1929. Earlier in his career Routis competed as a bantamweight, where he won the French title and fought three times for the EBU title. Before turning professional Routis won the French amateur bantamweight championship in 1918.

== Professional career ==
Routis made his professional debut in February 1919 aged eighteen, when he beat Yves Gram by a four-round points decision. Like the majority of his early fights, the contest took place in his hometown of Bordeaux. He fought three times in April of the same year; a victory over Georges Gloria was followed by a draw with Bobby Diamond and his first loss, a ten-round decision against Emile Juliard in Paris. Following this defeat Routis returned to fighting in Bordeaux, remaining undefeated (including two draws) over his next seven bouts. In February 1921 he fought outside France for the first time when he faced Ali Ben Said in Casablanca, Morocco, he won the fight by disqualification. Over the next fourteen months Routis fought eleven times in Morocco, losing twice, including an unsuccessful challenge for Charles Ledoux's EBU bantamweight title. The two boxers fought a rematch in May 1923, for the EBU and French title, with the result the same as the first fight, a fifteen-round decision win for Ledoux. Routis won his first title in January 1924 when he faced Ledoux for a third time. The fight, which Routis won with a twenty-round points victory, was for the French bantamweight title. He remained undefeated for the remainder of 1924 before losing to Johnny Brown in London, and failing in a third attempt at the EBU title, losing a twenty-round decision to Henri Scillie in Brussels. In October Routis lost his French title to Kid Francis in Paris. In 1926 he lost twice to the future world champion Jack Kid Berg, both bouts took place in Berg's hometown of London.

From August 1926 to August 1927 Routis fought exclusively in the United States (9 wins, 5 losses and 1 draw). Now competing as a featherweight, Routis made his American debut against Eddie Anderson at Ebbets Field in Brooklyn. Routis won the fight with a twelve-round points decision, he beat Anderson twice more during his year in the United States. Included in his 5 losses was a defeat to the future world champion Tony Canzoneri, who beat Routis on points, and a pair of losses to Joe Glick. After his return to France Routis fought another future world champion, Panama Al Brown, this time winning over ten rounds. After a draw against Johnny Cuthbert in Paris, he returned to the United States and won five fights in a row, which led to his first attempt at a world title.

=== Featherweight world champion ===
In September 1928 Routis challenged Canzoneri for the world featherweight title, the NYSAC and NBA titles were also on the line. The fight took place in front of 10,000 spectators at New York City's Madison Square Garden. The contest started badly for Routis as he was knocked down by a right hook in the first two minutes of the opening round. Routis had to survive a barrage of punches from the champion for the remainder of the round but managed to stay on his feet. Canzoneri continued to outbox Routis over the first half of the fight, resulting in a large lead on the scorecards. The second half of the fight, however, belonged to the challenger, who frequently connected with punches to the head and body that hurt Canzoneri. After fifteen rounds the fight was awarded to Routis via a split decision. Following this victory Routis lost two 10 round non-title fights to Dick Finnegan and Canzoneri. The first defence of his title came in May 1929 when he fought Buster Brown in Baltimore. After winning the first two rounds Brown was knocked down three times in the 3rd, causing the corner to throw in the towel, giving Routis a technical knockout victory. Following the bout Police had to surround the ring to prevent a riot after the crowd took exception to the actions of Brown's corner.

From June to August 1929 Routis lost four fights in a row, all non-title bouts. This was followed, in September, by the 2nd defence of his title, against Battling Battalino in East Hartford. Routis, who was considered to be past his best, was unable to prevent Battalino from dominating the fifteen rounds to become the new champion. Routis fought for a final time in November 1929, losing a 10-round newspaper decision to Davey Abad in St. Louis.

== Personal life ==
A veteran of the French Colonial Army, Routis spent two years based in Morocco as a mechanic in the air corps. In July 1969, on the day of his 69th birthday, Routis suffered a heart attack which led to his death.

== Professional boxing record ==
All information in this section is derived from BoxRec, unless otherwise stated.

=== Official record ===
88 fights	56 wins	24 losses
By knockout	13	2
By decision	31	17
By disqualification	12	5
Draws	7	
Newspaper decisions/draws	1	

All newspaper decisions are officially regarded as “no decision” bouts and are not counted in the win/loss/draw column.

No.	Result	Record	Opponent	Type	Round	Date	Location	Notes
88	Loss	56–24–7 (1)	Davey Abad	NWS	10	Nov 5, 1929	Arena, Saint Louis, Missouri, U.S.	
87	Loss	56–24–7	Christopher Battalino	PTS	15	Sep 23, 1929	Hurley Stadium, East Hartford, Connecticut, U.S.	Lost NYSAC, NBA, and The Ring featherweight titles
86	Loss	56–23–7	Johnny Datto	PTS	10	Aug 28, 1929	Taylor Bowl, Newburgh Heights, Ohio, U.S.	
85	Loss	56–22–7	Al Singer	TKO	2 (10)	Jul 24, 1929	Ebbets Field, New York City, New York, U.S.	
84	Loss	56–21–7	Jake Zeramby	PTS	10	Jul 8, 1929	Boston Garden, Boston, Massachusetts, U.S.	
83	Loss	56–20–7	Jackie Cohen	DQ	6 (10)	Jun 19, 1929	Forum, Montreal, Quebec, Canada	Low blow
82	Win	56–19–7	Buster Brown	TKO	3 (15)	May 27, 1929	Carlin's Park, Baltimore, Maryland, U.S.	Retained NYSAC, NBA, and The Ring featherweight titles
81	Loss	55–19–7	Tony Canzoneri	UD	10	May 10, 1929	Chicago Stadium, Chicago, Illinois, U.S.	
80	Loss	55–18–7	Dick Finnegan	UD	10	Nov 17, 1928	Boston Garden, Boston, Massachusetts, U.S.	
79	Win	55–17–7	Tony Canzoneri	SD	15	Sep 28, 1928	Madison Square Garden, New York City, New York, U.S.	Won NYSAC, NBA, and The Ring featherweight titles
78	Win	54–17–7	Vic Burrone	PTS	10	Jul 25, 1928	Ebbets Field, New York City, New York, U.S.	
77	Win	53–17–7	Carl Duane	PTS	10	Jul 3, 1928	Queensboro Stadium, Long Island City, New York City, New York, U.S.	
76	Win	52–17–7	Sammy Dorfman	PTS	10	May 4, 1928	Madison Square Garden, New York City, New York, U.S.	
75	Win	51–17–7	Ignacio Fernandez	PTS	12	Apr 26, 1928	Cleveland, Ohio, U.S.	
74	Win	50–17–7	Sammy Dorfman	DQ	5 (10)	Mar 23, 1928	Madison Square Garden, New York City, New York, U.S.	
73	Draw	49–17–7	Johnny Cuthbert	PTS	12	Jan 14, 1928	Velodrome d'Hiver, Paris, Paris, France	
72	Win	49–17–6	Panama Al Brown	PTS	10	Dec 10, 1927	Velodrome d'Hiver, Paris, Paris, France	
71	Loss	48–17–6	Joe Glick	PTS	10	Aug 17, 1927	Ebbets Field, New York City, New York, U.S.	
70	Win	48–16–6	Joe Malone	PTS	10	Aug 2, 1927	Queensboro Stadium, Long Island City, New York City, New York, U.S.	
69	Draw	47–16–6	Emory Cabana	PTS	10	Jun 27, 1927	Shibe Park, Philadelphia, Pennsylvania, U.S.	
68	Loss	47–16–5	Joe Glick	PTS	10	Jun 7, 1927	Queensboro Stadium, Long Island City, New York City, New York, U.S.	
67	Win	47–15–5	Tommy Crowley	PTS	10	May 9, 1927	Arena, Philadelphia, Pennsylvania, U.S.	
66	Win	46–15–5	Carl Tremaine	PTS	10	Apr 25, 1927	St. Nicholas Arena, New York City, New York, U.S.	
65	Loss	45–15–5	Joseph Salas	DQ	2 (10)	Apr 1, 1927	Madison Square Garden, New York City, New York, U.S.	
64	Loss	45–14–5	Henry Lenard	PTS	10	Mar 17, 1927	Coliseum, Chicago, Illinois, U.S.	
63	Win	45–13–5	Petey Mack	PTS	10	Jan 24, 1927	Broadway Arena, New York City, New York, U.S.	
62	Win	44–13–5	Cowboy Eddie Anderson	PTS	10	Dec 27, 1926	Broadway Arena, New York City, New York, U.S.	
61	Win	43–13–5	Frankie Fink	PTS	10	Dec 18, 1926	Ridgewood Grove, New York City, New York, U.S.	
60	Loss	42–13–5	Tony Canzoneri	PTS	12	Nov 22, 1926	Broadway Arena, New York City, New York, U.S.	
59	Win	42–12–5	Allentown Johnny Leonard	PTS	10	Oct 25, 1926	Broadway Arena, New York City, New York, U.S.	
58	Win	41–12–5	Cowboy Eddie Anderson	DQ	4 (10)	Sep 27, 1926	Broadway Arena, New York City, New York, U.S.	
57	Win	40–12–5	Cowboy Eddie Anderson	PTS	10	Aug 20, 1926	Ebbets Field, New York City, New York, U.S.	
56	Loss	39–12–5	Jack Kid Berg	DQ	3 (15)	Jun 21, 1926	Royal Albert Hall, Kensington, London, England	
55	Win	39–11–5	Paul Gay	PTS	12	May 18, 1926	Velodrome d'Hiver, Paris, Paris, France	Retained French bantamweight title
54	Loss	38–11–5	Jack Kid Berg	PTS	15	Mar 18, 1926	Royal Albert Hall, Kensington, London, England	
53	Win	38–10–5	Gaston Cassini	PTS	12	Mar 2, 1926	Cirque de Paris, Paris, Paris, France	
52	Loss	37–10–5	Harry Corbett	PTS	15	Nov 19, 1925	Royal Albert Hall, Kensington, London, England	
51	Loss	37–9–5	Kid Francis	PTS	15	Oct 27, 1925	Cirque de Paris, Paris, Paris, France	Retained French bantamweight title
50	Win	37–8–5	Pierre Calloir	KO	4 (10)	Sep 12, 1925	Casablanca, French Protectorate in Morocco	
49	Win	36–8–5	Battling van Dijk	TKO	14 (15)	Jun 25, 1925	Royal Albert Hall, Kensington, London, England	
48	Loss	35–8–5	Johnny Brown	DQ	5 (15)	Apr 30, 1925	Royal Albert Hall, Kensington, London, England	
47	Win	35–7–5	Antoine Ascencio	KO	6 (10)	Apr 19, 1925	Arenes d'Eckmühl, Oran, Algeria	Retained French bantamweight title
46	Draw	34–7–5	Edouard Mascart	PTS	15	Oct 7, 1924	Cirque de Paris, Paris, Paris, France	
45	Win	34–7–4	Henri Hébrant	PTS	15	Aug 13, 1924	Deauville, Calvados, France	
44	Win	33–7–4	Edouard Mascart	DQ	4 (10)	Apr 29, 1924	Velodrome d'Hiver, Paris, Paris, France	
43	Win	32–7–4	Harry Lake	PTS	15	Feb 29, 1924	Cosmopolitan Gymnasium, Plymouth, Devon, England	
42	Win	31–7–4	Charles Ledoux	PTS	20	Jan 22, 1924	Cirque de Paris, Paris, Paris, France	Won French bantamweight title
41	Win	30–7–4	Pierre Calloir	PTS	12	Nov 21, 1923	Palais d'Hiver, Lyon, Rhône, France	
40	Win	29–7–4	Pierre Calloir	DQ	15 (15)	Sep 25, 1923	Cirque de Paris, Paris, Paris, France	
39	Loss	28–7–4	Pierre Denain	SD	10	Sep 2, 1923	Chartreux, Marseille, Bouches-du-Rhône, France	
38	Draw	28–6–4	Pierre Calloir	PTS	15	Jun 23, 1923	Cirque de Paris, Paris, Paris, France	
37	Loss	28–6–3	Charles Ledoux	PTS	15	May 6, 1923	Stade Buffalo, Montrouge, Hauts-de-Seine, France	For IBU and French bantamweight titles
36	Win	28–5–3	Eugene Julien	PTS	12	Mar 24, 1923	Velodrome d'Hiver, Paris, Paris, France	
35	Win	27–5–3	Emile Juliard	DQ	3 (12)	Feb 3, 1923	Casablanca, French Protectorate in Morocco	"Passivity"
34	Win	26–5–3	Andre Depont	KO	3 (12)	Dec 2, 1922	Velodrome d'Hiver, Paris, Paris, France	
33	Win	25–5–3	Johnny Chislett	KO	9 (20)	Nov 13, 1922	The Ring, Blackfriars Road, Southwark, London, England	
32	Win	24–5–3	Charles Miet	PTS	6	Nov 4, 1922	Velodrome d'Hiver, Paris, Paris, France	
31	Loss	23–5–3	Michel Montreuil	KO	2 (10)	Oct 7, 1922	Velodrome d'Hiver, Paris, Paris, France	
30	Win	23–4–3	Edouard Prie	PTS	4	Sep 7, 1922	Kursaal, Paris, Paris, France	
29	Loss	22–4–3	Charles Ledoux	PTS	15	Jun 18, 1922	Casablanca, French Protectorate in Morocco	For IBU and French bantamweight titles
28	Win	22–3–3	Julien Couleaud	TKO	4 (10)	May 5, 1922	Casablanca, French Protectorate in Morocco	
27	Win	21–3–3	Robert Dastillon	DQ	5 (10)	Apr 21, 1922	Casablanca, French Protectorate in Morocco	
26	Win	20–3–3	Lucien Blaise	DQ	8 (10)	Apr 2, 1922	Casablanca, French Protectorate in Morocco	
25	Loss	19–3–3	Julien Couleaud	DQ	8 (10)	Feb 7, 1922	Casablanca, French Protectorate in Morocco	
24	Win	19–2–3	Robert Dastillon	KO	3 (10)	Jan 2, 1922	Casablanca, French Protectorate in Morocco	
23	Win	18–2–3	Lucien Blaise	DQ	3 (10)	Dec 2, 1921	Casablanca, French Protectorate in Morocco	
22	Win	17–2–3	Edoardo Piacentini	PTS	10	Aug 7, 1921	Casablanca, French Protectorate in Morocco	
21	Win	16–2–3	Andre Reby	KO	3 (10)	Jul 2, 1921	Sallle Franklin, Bordeaux, Gironde, France	
20	Win	15–2–3	Harry Lake	PTS	10	Jun 17, 1921	Cirque de Paris, Paris, Paris, France	
19	Win	14–2–3	Eugene Husson	DQ	6 (10)	Jun 3, 1921	Casablanca, French Protectorate in Morocco	
18	Win	13–2–3	Yvon Glaize	KO	7 (15)	May 4, 1921	Casablanca, French Protectorate in Morocco	
17	Win	12–2–3	Maurice Perez	KO	3 (?)	Mar 8, 1921	Casablanca, French Protectorate in Morocco	
16	Win	11–2–3	Ali ben Said	DQ	3 (10)	Feb 13, 1921	Casablanca, French Protectorate in Morocco	
15	Win	10–2–3	Robert Corbiaux	KO	10 (10)	Dec 18, 1920	Wonderland, Bordeaux, Gironde, France	
14	Win	9–2–3	Georges Barklett	PTS	12	Nov 27, 1920	Alhambra, Bordeaux, Gironde, France	
13	Win	8–2–3	Georges Gloria	KO	3 (4)	Jul 4, 1920	Bordeaux, Gironde, France	
12	Win	7–2–3	Paul Marignan	PTS	4	Apr 10, 1920	Skating Palace, Bordeaux, Gironde, France	
11	Win	6–2–3	Denis Luciani	DQ	7 (10)	Mar 2, 1920	Bordeaux, Gironde, France	
10	Draw	5–2–3	Albert Bouzonnie	PTS	10	Feb 2, 1920	Alhambra, Bordeaux, Gironde, France	
9	Draw	5–2–2	Emile Juliard	PTS	12	Dec 22, 1919	Bordeaux, Gironde, France	
8	Win	5–2–1	Andre Dorlet	PTS	6	Aug 13, 1919	Bordeaux, Gironde, France	
7	Win	4–2–1	Lebois	PTS	8	Aug 10, 1919	Vélodrome du Parc, Bordeaux, Gironde, France	
6	Loss	3–2–1	Emile Juliard	PTS	10	Apr 17, 1919	National Sporting Club, Paris, Paris, France	
5	Draw	3–1–1	Robert Diamant	PTS	8	Apr 7, 1919	Bordeaux, Gironde, France	
4	Win	3–1	Georges Gloria	DQ	6 (6)	Apr 6, 1919	Bordeaux, Gironde, France	
3	Win	2–1	Espinault	PTS	?	Feb 22, 1919	Bordeaux, Gironde, France	
2	Win	1–1	Yves Gram	PTS	4	Feb 2, 1919	Bordeaux, Gironde, France	
1	Loss	0–1	Harry Roose	PTS	4	Sep 29, 1918	Bordeaux, Gironde, France	

=== Unofficial record ===
88 fights	56 wins	25 losses
By knockout	13	2
By decision	31	18
By disqualification	12	5
Draws	7	

Record with the inclusion of newspaper decisions in the win/loss/draw column.

No.	Result	Record	Opponent	Type	Round	Date	Location	Notes
88	Loss	56–25–7	Davey Abad	NWS	10	Nov 5, 1929	Arena, Saint Louis, Missouri, U.S.	
87	Loss	56–24–7	Christopher Battalino	PTS	15	Sep 23, 1929	Hurley Stadium, East Hartford, Connecticut, U.S.	Lost NYSAC, NBA, and The Ring featherweight titles
86	Loss	56–23–7	Johnny Datto	PTS	10	Aug 28, 1929	Taylor Bowl, Newburgh Heights, Ohio, U.S.	
85	Loss	56–22–7	Al Singer	TKO	2 (10)	Jul 24, 1929	Ebbets Field, New York City, New York, U.S.	
84	Loss	56–21–7	Jake Zeramby	PTS	10	Jul 8, 1929	Boston Garden, Boston, Massachusetts, U.S.	
83	Loss	56–20–7	Jackie Cohen	DQ	6 (10)	Jun 19, 1929	Forum, Montreal, Quebec, Canada	Low blow
82	Win	56–19–7	Buster Brown	TKO	3 (15)	May 27, 1929	Carlin's Park, Baltimore, Maryland, U.S.	Retained NYSAC, NBA, and The Ring featherweight titles
81	Loss	55–19–7	Tony Canzoneri	UD	10	May 10, 1929	Chicago Stadium, Chicago, Illinois, U.S.	
80	Loss	55–18–7	Dick Finnegan	UD	10	Nov 17, 1928	Boston Garden, Boston, Massachusetts, U.S.	
79	Win	55–17–7	Tony Canzoneri	SD	15	Sep 28, 1928	Madison Square Garden, New York City, New York, U.S.	Won NYSAC, NBA, and The Ring featherweight titles
78	Win	54–17–7	Vic Burrone	PTS	10	Jul 25, 1928	Ebbets Field, New York City, New York, U.S.	
77	Win	53–17–7	Carl Duane	PTS	10	Jul 3, 1928	Queensboro Stadium, Long Island City, New York City, New York, U.S.	
76	Win	52–17–7	Sammy Dorfman	PTS	10	May 4, 1928	Madison Square Garden, New York City, New York, U.S.	
75	Win	51–17–7	Ignacio Fernandez	PTS	12	Apr 26, 1928	Cleveland, Ohio, U.S.	
74	Win	50–17–7	Sammy Dorfman	DQ	5 (10)	Mar 23, 1928	Madison Square Garden, New York City, New York, U.S.	
73	Draw	49–17–7	Johnny Cuthbert	PTS	12	Jan 14, 1928	Velodrome d'Hiver, Paris, Paris, France	
72	Win	49–17–6	Panama Al Brown	PTS	10	Dec 10, 1927	Velodrome d'Hiver, Paris, Paris, France	
71	Loss	48–17–6	Joe Glick	PTS	10	Aug 17, 1927	Ebbets Field, New York City, New York, U.S.	
70	Win	48–16–6	Joe Malone	PTS	10	Aug 2, 1927	Queensboro Stadium, Long Island City, New York City, New York, U.S.	
69	Draw	47–16–6	Emory Cabana	PTS	10	Jun 27, 1927	Shibe Park, Philadelphia, Pennsylvania, U.S.	
68	Loss	47–16–5	Joe Glick	PTS	10	Jun 7, 1927	Queensboro Stadium, Long Island City, New York City, New York, U.S.	
67	Win	47–15–5	Tommy Crowley	PTS	10	May 9, 1927	Arena, Philadelphia, Pennsylvania, U.S.	
66	Win	46–15–5	Carl Tremaine	PTS	10	Apr 25, 1927	St. Nicholas Arena, New York City, New York, U.S.	
65	Loss	45–15–5	Joseph Salas	DQ	2 (10)	Apr 1, 1927	Madison Square Garden, New York City, New York, U.S.	
64	Loss	45–14–5	Henry Lenard	PTS	10	Mar 17, 1927	Coliseum, Chicago, Illinois, U.S.	
63	Win	45–13–5	Petey Mack	PTS	10	Jan 24, 1927	Broadway Arena, New York City, New York, U.S.	
62	Win	44–13–5	Cowboy Eddie Anderson	PTS	10	Dec 27, 1926	Broadway Arena, New York City, New York, U.S.	
61	Win	43–13–5	Frankie Fink	PTS	10	Dec 18, 1926	Ridgewood Grove, New York City, New York, U.S.	
60	Loss	42–13–5	Tony Canzoneri	PTS	12	Nov 22, 1926	Broadway Arena, New York City, New York, U.S.	
59	Win	42–12–5	Allentown Johnny Leonard	PTS	10	Oct 25, 1926	Broadway Arena, New York City, New York, U.S.	
58	Win	41–12–5	Cowboy Eddie Anderson	DQ	4 (10)	Sep 27, 1926	Broadway Arena, New York City, New York, U.S.	
57	Win	40–12–5	Cowboy Eddie Anderson	PTS	10	Aug 20, 1926	Ebbets Field, New York City, New York, U.S.	
56	Loss	39–12–5	Jack Kid Berg	DQ	3 (15)	Jun 21, 1926	Royal Albert Hall, Kensington, London, England	
55	Win	39–11–5	Paul Gay	PTS	12	May 18, 1926	Velodrome d'Hiver, Paris, Paris, France	Retained French bantamweight title
54	Loss	38–11–5	Jack Kid Berg	PTS	15	Mar 18, 1926	Royal Albert Hall, Kensington, London, England	
53	Win	38–10–5	Gaston Cassini	PTS	12	Mar 2, 1926	Cirque de Paris, Paris, Paris, France	
52	Loss	37–10–5	Harry Corbett	PTS	15	Nov 19, 1925	Royal Albert Hall, Kensington, London, England	
51	Loss	37–9–5	Kid Francis	PTS	15	Oct 27, 1925	Cirque de Paris, Paris, Paris, France	Retained French bantamweight title
50	Win	37–8–5	Pierre Calloir	KO	4 (10)	Sep 12, 1925	Casablanca, French Protectorate in Morocco	
49	Win	36–8–5	Battling van Dijk	TKO	14 (15)	Jun 25, 1925	Royal Albert Hall, Kensington, London, England	
48	Loss	35–8–5	Johnny Brown	DQ	5 (15)	Apr 30, 1925	Royal Albert Hall, Kensington, London, England	
47	Win	35–7–5	Antoine Ascencio	KO	6 (10)	Apr 19, 1925	Arenes d'Eckmühl, Oran, Algeria	Retained French bantamweight title
46	Draw	34–7–5	Edouard Mascart	PTS	15	Oct 7, 1924	Cirque de Paris, Paris, Paris, France	
45	Win	34–7–4	Henri Hébrans	PTS	15	Aug 13, 1924	Deauville, Calvados, France	
44	Win	33–7–4	Edouard Mascart	DQ	4 (10)	Apr 29, 1924	Velodrome d'Hiver, Paris, Paris, France	
43	Win	32–7–4	Harry Lake	PTS	15	Feb 29, 1924	Cosmopolitan Gymnasium, Plymouth, Devon, England	
42	Win	31–7–4	Charles Ledoux	PTS	20	Jan 22, 1924	Cirque de Paris, Paris, Paris, France	Won French bantamweight title
41	Win	30–7–4	Pierre Calloir	PTS	12	Nov 21, 1923	Palais d'Hiver, Lyon, Rhône, France	
40	Win	29–7–4	Pierre Calloir	DQ	15 (15)	Sep 25, 1923	Cirque de Paris, Paris, Paris, France	
39	Loss	28–7–4	Pierre Denain	SD	10	Sep 2, 1923	Chartreux, Marseille, Bouches-du-Rhône, France	
38	Draw	28–6–4	Pierre Calloir	PTS	15	Jun 23, 1923	Cirque de Paris, Paris, Paris, France	
37	Loss	28–6–3	Charles Ledoux	PTS	15	May 6, 1923	Stade Buffalo, Montrouge, Hauts-de-Seine, France	For IBU and French bantamweight titles
36	Win	28–5–3	Eugene Julien	PTS	12	Mar 24, 1923	Velodrome d'Hiver, Paris, Paris, France	
35	Win	27–5–3	Emile Juliard	DQ	3 (12)	Feb 3, 1923	Casablanca, French Protectorate in Morocco	"Passivity"
34	Win	26–5–3	Andre Depont	KO	3 (12)	Dec 2, 1922	Velodrome d'Hiver, Paris, Paris, France	
33	Win	25–5–3	Johnny Chislett	KO	9 (20)	Nov 13, 1922	The Ring, Blackfriars Road, Southwark, London, England	
32	Win	24–5–3	Charles Miet	PTS	6	Nov 4, 1922	Velodrome d'Hiver, Paris, Paris, France	
31	Loss	23–5–3	Michel Montreuil	KO	2 (10)	Oct 7, 1922	Velodrome d'Hiver, Paris, Paris, France	
30	Win	23–4–3	Edouard Prie	PTS	4	Sep 7, 1922	Kursaal, Paris, Paris, France	
29	Loss	22–4–3	Charles Ledoux	PTS	15	Jun 18, 1922	Casablanca, French Protectorate in Morocco	For IBU and French bantamweight titles
28	Win	22–3–3	Julien Couleaud	TKO	4 (10)	May 5, 1922	Casablanca, French Protectorate in Morocco	
27	Win	21–3–3	Robert Dastillon	DQ	5 (10)	Apr 21, 1922	Casablanca, French Protectorate in Morocco	
26	Win	20–3–3	Lucien Blaise	DQ	8 (10)	Apr 2, 1922	Casablanca, French Protectorate in Morocco	
25	Loss	19–3–3	Julien Couleaud	DQ	8 (10)	Feb 7, 1922	Casablanca, French Protectorate in Morocco	
24	Win	19–2–3	Robert Dastillon	KO	3 (10)	Jan 2, 1922	Casablanca, French Protectorate in Morocco	
23	Win	18–2–3	Lucien Blaise	DQ	3 (10)	Dec 2, 1921	Casablanca, French Protectorate in Morocco	
22	Win	17–2–3	Edoardo Piacentini	PTS	10	Aug 7, 1921	Casablanca, French Protectorate in Morocco	
21	Win	16–2–3	Andre Reby	KO	3 (10)	Jul 2, 1921	Sallle Franklin, Bordeaux, Gironde, France	
20	Win	15–2–3	Harry Lake	PTS	10	Jun 17, 1921	Cirque de Paris, Paris, Paris, France	
19	Win	14–2–3	Eugene Husson	DQ	6 (10)	Jun 3, 1921	Casablanca, French Protectorate in Morocco	
18	Win	13–2–3	Yvon Glaize	KO	7 (15)	May 4, 1921	Casablanca, French Protectorate in Morocco	
17	Win	12–2–3	Maurice Perez	KO	3 (?)	Mar 8, 1921	Casablanca, French Protectorate in Morocco	
16	Win	11–2–3	Ali ben Said	DQ	3 (10)	Feb 13, 1921	Casablanca, French Protectorate in Morocco	
15	Win	10–2–3	Robert Corbiaux	KO	10 (10)	Dec 18, 1920	Wonderland, Bordeaux, Gironde, France	
14	Win	9–2–3	Georges Barklett	PTS	12	Nov 27, 1920	Alhambra, Bordeaux, Gironde, France	
13	Win	8–2–3	Georges Gloria	KO	3 (4)	Jul 4, 1920	Bordeaux, Gironde, France	
12	Win	7–2–3	Paul Marignan	PTS	4	Apr 10, 1920	Skating Palace, Bordeaux, Gironde, France	
11	Win	6–2–3	Denis Luciani	DQ	7 (10)	Mar 2, 1920	Bordeaux, Gironde, France	
10	Draw	5–2–3	Albert Bouzonnie	PTS	10	Feb 2, 1920	Alhambra, Bordeaux, Gironde, France	
9	Draw	5–2–2	Emile Juliard	PTS	12	Dec 22, 1919	Bordeaux, Gironde, France	
8	Win	5–2–1	Andre Dorlet	PTS	6	Aug 13, 1919	Bordeaux, Gironde, France	
7	Win	4–2–1	Lebois	PTS	8	Aug 10, 1919	Vélodrome du Parc, Bordeaux, Gironde, France	
6	Loss	3–2–1	Emile Juliard	PTS	10	Apr 17, 1919	National Sporting Club, Paris, Paris, France	
5	Draw	3–1–1	Robert Diamant	PTS	8	Apr 7, 1919	Bordeaux, Gironde, France	
4	Win	3–1	Georges Gloria	DQ	6 (6)	Apr 6, 1919	Bordeaux, Gironde, France	
3	Win	2–1	Espinault	PTS	?	Feb 22, 1919	Bordeaux, Gironde, France	
2	Win	1–1	Yves Gram	PTS	4	Feb 2, 1919	Bordeaux, Gironde, France	
1	Loss	0–1	Harry Roose	PTS	4	Sep 29, 1918	Bordeaux, Gironde, France	

== Titles in boxing ==
=== Major world titles ===
- NYSAC featherweight champion (126 lbs)
- NBA (WBA) featherweight champion (126 lbs)

=== The Ring magazine titles ===
- The Ring featherweight champion (126 lbs)

=== Regional/International titles ===
- French bantamweight champion (118 lbs)

=== Undisputed titles ===
- Undisputed featherweight champion

== See also ==
- Lineal championship

Achievements
Preceded by Tony Canzoneri	World Featherweight Champion; September 28, 1928 – September 23, 1929	Succeeded by Battling Battalino
