= Johnny Curley =

English boxer

Personal information
- Nationality: British
- Born: 9 November 1897
- Died: 31 December 1982 (aged 85)
- Weight: Featherweight, lightweight

Boxing career

Boxing record
- Total fights: 171
- Wins: 122
- Win by KO: 47
- Losses: 31
- Draws: 17

Johnny Curley (9 November 1897 – 31 December 1982) was an English boxer who was the British featherweight champion between 1925 and 1927.

== Career ==
From Lambeth, London, Curley made his professional debut in November 1913. By March 1925 he had fought over 100 times, winning more than 80 contests, including victories over Al Foreman, Ernie Izzard, Battling van Dijk, Billy Hindley and Bugler Harry Lake.

In March 1925 he beat George McKenzie on points over 20 rounds at the National Sporting Club to take the British featherweight title. He failed to win any of his next five fights, losing twice to Johnny Cuthbert. In another match against Phil Bond, the fight was declared a no contest after they both continued fighting after the end of the twelfth round. In October 1925, he was beaten on points by Jack Kid Berg.

In January 1926 he stopped Lake in the fourteenth round, and in March made the first defence of his British title against Harry Corbett (the first fight to be reported on live by BBC radio), taking a points decision. In June he stopped van Dijk in the fifth round, but lost by disqualification (for hitting low) a week later against French champion Edouard Mascart. In July he stopped Tommy Noble in the fifth round, and after losing to Cuthbert in September made a second successful title defence in November, with a points win over Hindley to win the Lonsdale Belt outright. He finished the year with wins over Jack "Kid Froggy" Hyams and Young Johnny Brown.

Curley made a third defence of the title in January 1927, losing a points decision to Cuthbert. He won seven of nine fights in the remainder of the year, and travelled to Australia in 1928, where he won all four of his fights, including a points win over Australian champion Tommy Barber. Back in England, he beat Auguste Gyde on points in July, but by the end of the year his fortunes dipped.

From 1929 until his retirement on medical advice in 1931 he won only six of 34 fights. During this period he also refereed bouts. He returned in 1937 for one fight, a defeat at the hands of Al Church.
