= Jim Hunter (boxer) =

Scottish boxer

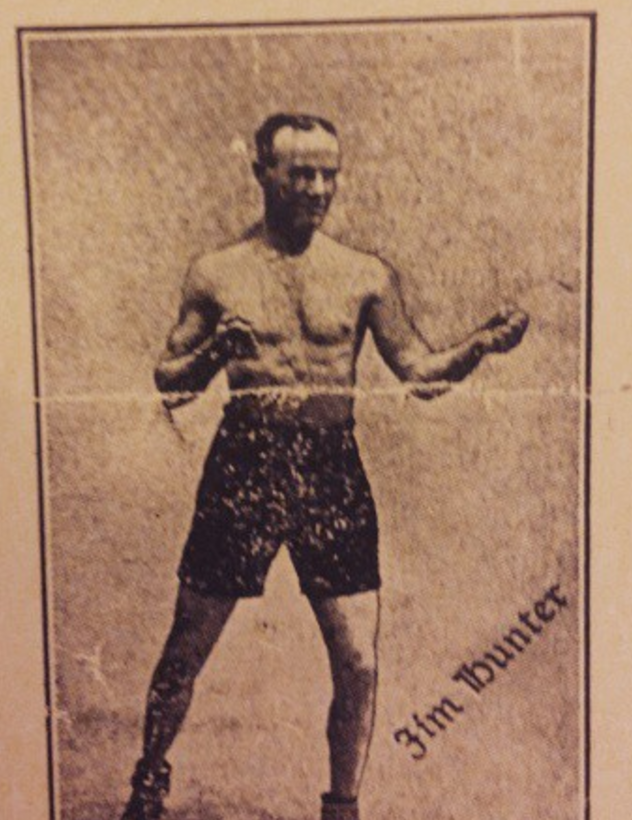

Personal information
- Nationality: British
- Weight: lightweight

Boxing career

Boxing record
- Total fights: 40
- Wins: 20
- Win by KO: 11
- Losses: 19
- Draws: 1

Jim Hunter was a British boxer who was Scottish lightweight champion between 1930 and 1933. He held residence in Dunfermline, Scotland.

== Career ==
Jim Hunter made his professional boxing debut in 1919, defeating fellow debutant Billy Jones by KO. Hunter defeated Alistair McInroy in 1930 to become Scottish area lightweight. He went on to fight Johnny Cuthbert for the British lightweight title in 1932 at the White City Stadium in Glasgow but lost by KO in the tenth round. In 1933 he lost the Scottish lightweight title to Tommy Spiers in a rematch.

His last fight was in 1934, losing to Pat Slavin by points.
