= Johnny Cuthbert =

Personal information
- Nickname: Young Cuthbert
- Nationality: British
- Born: 9 July 1904 Sheffield, England
- Died: 29 August 1987 (aged 83)
- Weight: Featherweight, lightweight

Boxing career

Boxing record
- Total fights: 175
- Wins: 124
- Win by KO: 37
- Losses: 34
- Draws: 17

Johnny Cuthbert (9 July 1904 – 29 August 1987) was a British boxer who was British featherweight champion between 1927 and 1928, and again from 1929 to 1931, winning the Lonsdale Belt outright, and British lightweight champion between 1932 and 1934.

== Career ==
=== Early career and featherweight title ===
Born in Sheffield in 1904, Johnny Cuthbert was taught boxing by Ben Stanton as a reward for attending the Reverend Harold Ewbank's Sunday School classes.

He made his professional boxing debut in February 1920. After facing inexperienced opposition during his first two years as a pro, he beat then Scottish Area bantamweight champion (and future British, Empire, and European flyweight champion) Elky Clark on points in January 1924. During a 15-fight unbeaten run between 1923 and 1924 he beat Harry Corbett and Billy Hindley, before travelling to the United States for a series of fights. After losing his first five US fights, including a defeat at the hands of Chick Suggs, he won his final fight before returning to England.

In March 1925, he lost to former British, Empire, and European bantamweight champion Bugler Harry Lake, but avenged this two months later, only three weeks after beating Johnny Curley over 15 rounds. In another successful run during 1925 he also beat Jack Kid Berg, but in August he lost to Corbett, starting a run of four straight defeats, including losses to European bantamweight champion Johnny Brown, Joe Fox, and Berg.

He was unbeaten again in 20 fights between March and December 1926, including wins over Lake, Curley, and Corbett (twice), finally earning him a shot at Curley's British featherweight title in January 1927; Cuthbert took a points decision to become British champion. He lost the title to Corbett in March 1928 in the last British title fight over 20 rounds. In November 1928 he drew with World bantamweight champion Al Brown in Paris.

He challenged for the title again a year later against Corbett, but the fight ended in a draw. He regained it at the second attempt in May 1928, beating Corbett on points at Olympia. He successfully defended the title in May 1929 against Dom Volante, and retained it in November 1930 after a drawn bout against Nel Tarleton. He beat Al Brown in June 1931, Brown disqualified for hitting low. His third defence, against Al Foreman (with the British Empire title also at stake), also ended in a draw. He lost the title in October 1931 when Tarleton took a points decision at Anfield. Cuthbert ran the Old Brown Cow pub in Sheffield and trained in a gym at the back of it.

=== Lightweight ===
After repeatedly struggling to make featherweight, Cuthbert moved up to lightweight and after beating Volante in an eliminator faced Jim Hunter in August 1932 for the vacant British title, winning via knockout in the tenth round. Between those two fights he lost on points to Cleto Locatelli in Paris. In October 1932 he beat Tommy Bland on points but suffered a broken jaw during the fight. Two weeks later he announced his retirement from boxing.

In February 1933 he came out of retirement and a month later beat Jim Learoyd at Leeds Town Hall, but lost just a week later to French champion Victor Deckmyn in Paris.

He defended his British title in January 1934, losing to Harry Mizler on points at the Royal Albert Hall. He had three further fights, a defeat to British featherweight champion Seaman Tommy Watson, a win over Canadian lightweight champion Tommy Bland, and a loss to NBA World featherweight champion Freddie Miller, before retiring from the sport for good.

=== After boxing ===
Cuthbert had first applied for a referee's licence in April 1934, and refereed several bouts in 1935; By 1933 he had moved to Boston, Lincolnshire, where he ran The Old Mill pub. He again planned to move into refereeing in the late 1930s. He went on to become a boxing trainer, working at the Consett Gym with the likes of Glenn McCrory, and at the Boston ABC. He boxed an exhibition bout in a charity tournament in aid of Grantham Hospital in August 1944.

Johnny Cuthbert died in 1987, aged 83.
