= Jack Kid Berg =

English boxer (1909–1991)

Personal information
- Nicknames: Jack "Kid" Berg; The Whitechapel Windmill
- Nationality: English
- Born: Judah Bergman; 28 June 1909 Whitechapel, London
- Died: 22 April 1991 (aged 81) London
- Height: 5 ft 9 in (1.75 m)
- Weight: Lightweight; Welterweight

Boxing career

Boxing record
- Total fights: 192
- Wins: 157
- Win by KO: 61
- Losses: 26
- Draws: 9

Judah Bergman, known as Jack Kid Berg or Jackie Kid Berg (28 June 1909 – 22 April 1991), was an English boxer born in the East End of London, who became the World Light Welterweight Champion in 1930.

== Biography ==
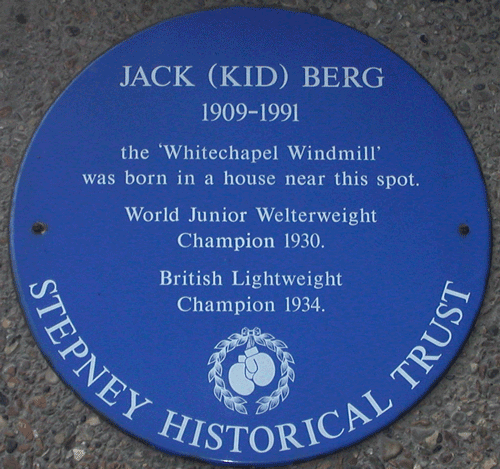
Blue plaque for Jack Kid Berg

Judah Bergman was born in Romford Street near Cable Street, St George in the East, Stepney. His father Judah Senior, who found work as a tailor in America, and his mother Mildred immigrated from Odessa. His siblings included Wolf, changed to Willie, Rebecca and Sarah. He was apprenticed as a lather boy in a barber's shop, and began his boxing career at the Premierland, Back Church Lane, when he was 14. Jewish Berg boxed with a Star of David on his trunks.

The book The Whitechapel Windmill covers the handsome boxer's rise in the boxing world as well as his flamboyant out-of-the-ring life, which is said to have included an affair with Mae West and a long-lasting friendship with fellow East Ender Jack Comer, the colourful (and also Jewish) gangster.

After losing his British Lightweight crown, he lived to be the oldest British boxing champion. Berg died in London on 22 April 1991.

He is commemorated by a blue plaque on Noble Court, Cable Street, close to the place where he was born. Stepney Historical Trust presented the plaque at a ceremony attended by the Chief Rabbi, the Bishop of Stepney Richard Chartres, Professor Bill Fishman, Councillor Albert lilley and the Retired Boxers Federation. Later in the evening the Trust held a Charity Ball to raise funds for the Retired Boxers Federation attended by Mr Cox, Chairman of the Boxing Association and also the local Arbour Youth and Repton Boxing Clubs Boys. Over £1000 was raised for the Retired Boxing charity.

== Career ==
Between 1923 and 1936, Berg had 192 professional fights, winning 157 of them. His record was 157–26–9. Fifty seven wins were by knock out.

In 1931 he moved to the US, where he won 64 out of 76 fights there. During his bouts in America, he was trained by legendary boxing trainer Ray Arcel.

In 1930, Berg defeated the great Cuban fighter Kid Chocolate in ten rounds. The Chocolate bout, fought in Queens, New York in 1932, had 10,000 spectators, larger than many of his British bouts. In 1930, he knocked out the American champion Mushy Callahan to take the World Light Welterweight Championship in London. The National Boxing Association (NBA) had stripped Callahan before this fight and Britain did not recognize this division, so only the New York State Athletic Commission recognized Berg as champion after this fight. The NBA only recognized Berg as champion after he beat Goldie Hess in January 1931.

Berg fought as a lightweight when he put his title on the line to meet with Tony Canzoneri in Chicago on 24 April 1931. He was quickly knocked out in three rounds, falling on his face and stumbling to get up before giving in and collapsing into the ropes. Berg, contending that he lost at lightweight and not at light welterweight, continued to claim that he was champion. Most of the boxing world recognized Canzoneri, however. He unsuccessfully challenged Canzoneri again for the title in September 1931.

After the Canzoneri bout, Berg continued boxing with mixed results. He became British lightweight champion in 1934 by beating the title holder Harry Mizler, another Jewish boxer. He was thrust back into the limelight as a replacement for the injured Canzoneri against Cleto Locatelli at Madison Square Garden, but his hopes of challenging for the world title faded after a points defeat to Gustave Humery in Paris in February 1935, also losing a return bout in London in April, although Berg was still British champion at this point. Later that year he lost to Laurie Stevens in a fight for the British Empire lightweight title in Johannesburg. He returned to fighting at welterweight in the United States with some success. In August 1936, after three straight defeats, he announced his retirement, but returned in January 1937 with a victory against Ivor Pickens, the first of a nine fight unbeaten run. In January 1941 he moved up to middleweight to fight Harry Craster. He again beat Mizler in February 1941 and defeated British lightweight champion Eric Boon on a disqualification due to a low blow in a non-title fight in April 1941. After a victory over Eric Dolby in March 1945, Berg expressed a desire to once more challenge for a title, saying "What I need is fights. I'm a bad gymnasium worker, but I'll show what I can do in the ring. When I've had a few warm up fights I'll know where I stand. If I'm no good I'll quit." He had two further fights, the last a win by knockout against Johnny MacDonald in May 1945, before retiring.

Berg's brother Teddy was also a boxer, and the two fought on the same bill in 1941.

After retiring from boxing, he worked as a film stunt man, joined the Royal Air Force, and owned a restaurant in London.

== Personal life ==
In 1930 Berg's marriage to New York University student Eleanor Kraus, the daughter of a New York silk merchant, was announced, although by November 1931 the relationship had ended. In September 1930 Berg was served with a writ claiming £10,000 for breach of promise by Sophia Levy, who claimed the two had a relationship. Berg married Bunty Pain, a dancer at the Trocadero, on 11 August 1933 at Prince's Row register office in London.

In October 1940 he was awarded £500 damages for slander after John Macadam suggested in a BBC broadcast that Berg would fight Eric Boon after "drawing his old-age pension" and "tottering along to Earl's Court", although the decision was overturned on appeal.

== Hall of Fame ==
Berg was inducted into the International Boxing Hall of Fame.

Berg was also inducted into the World Boxing Hall of Fame.

Berg, who was Jewish, was inducted into the International Jewish Sports Hall of Fame in 1993. The non-religious Berg used his Jewishness to get the crowd on his side, entering the ring wearing tephillin.

== Professional boxing record ==
192 fights	157 wins	26 losses
By knockout	60	9
By decision	83	17
By disqualification	14	0
Draws	9	

No.	Result	Record	Opponent	Type	Round	Date	Location	Notes
192	Win	157–26–9	Johnny MacDonald	KO	5 (8)	May 19, 1945	Standard Aero Works, Coventry, West Midlands, England	
191	Win	156–26–9	Jimmy Brunt	PTS	8	Mar 8, 1945	Seymour Hall Baths, Marylebone, London, England	
190	Win	155–26–9	Eric Dolby	KO	4 (8)	Mar 1, 1945	Caledonian Road Baths, Islington, London, England	
189	Loss	154–26–9	Gordon Woodhouse	PTS	6	May 22, 1943	Handcross, Sussex, England	
188	Win	154–25–9	Joe Connolly	KO	4 (10)	Mar 12, 1942	St Andrews Hall, Glasgow, Scotland	
187	Win	153–25–9	Paddy Roche	TKO	5 (10)	Feb 5, 1942	New St James Hall, Newcastle, Tyne and Wear, England	
186	Win	152–25–9	Joe Connolly	RTD	8 (10)	Nov 24, 1941	Town Hall, Leeds, Yorkshire, England	
185	Loss	151–25–9	George Odwell	PTS	10	Nov 2, 1941	Alexandra Theatre, Stoke Newington, London, England	
184	Loss	151–24–9	Arthur Danahar	TKO	5 (10)	Jul 24, 1941	Clapton Greyhound Track, Clapton, London, England	
183	Loss	151–23–9	Ernie Roderick	PTS	10	Jun 12, 1941	Royal Albert Hall, Kensington, London, England	
182	Win	151–22–9	Eric Boon	DQ	2 (12)	Apr 21, 1941	Coliseum, London, England	
181	Win	150–22–9	Harry Mizler	PTS	10	Feb 27, 1941	Cambridge Theatre, London, England	
180	Win	149–22–9	Harry Charman	PTS	6	Feb 20, 1941	Odeon Theatre, Leicester Square, London, England	
179	Win	148–22–9	Harry Craster	PTS	10	Jan 20, 1941	Cambridge Theatre, London, England	
178	Win	147–22–9	Harry Davis	TKO	8 (10)	Apr 4, 1940	Devonshire Club, Hackney, London, England	
177	Win	146–22–9	Seaman Dick Bradshaw	TKO	3 (10)	Mar 10, 1940	Devonshire Club, Hackney, London, England	
176	Win	145–22–9	Paddy Roche	TKO	4 (10)	Mar 8, 1940	Theatre Royal, Dublin, Ireland	
175	Win	144–22–9	Eddie Ryan	DQ	6 (12)	Feb 29, 1940	Earls Court Empress Hall, Kensington, London, England	Low blows
174	Win	143–22–9	George Reynolds	PTS	10	Feb 5, 1940	Colston Hall, Bristol, Avon, England	
173	Win	142–22–9	Harry Davis	PTS	10	Jan 25, 1940	Devonshire Club, Hackney, London, England	
172	Win	141–22–9	Paddy Roche	TKO	5 (10)	Dec 11, 1939	Ice Rink, Nottingham, Nottinghamshire, England	
171	Win	140–22–9	Paddy Roche	PTS	10	Nov 13, 1939	Sportsdrome, Southampton, Hampshire, England	
170	Win	139–22–9	Joey Greb	PTS	8	Aug 1, 1939	Belmont Park, Garfield, New Jersey, U.S.	
169	Win	138–22–9	Johnny Rohrig	PTS	10	Jul 11, 1939	Belmont Park, Garfield, New Jersey, U.S.	
168	Loss	137–22–9	Mike Piskin	PTS	10	Jun 30, 1939	Atlantic Stadium, Long Branch, New Jersey, U.S.	
167	Loss	137–21–9	Milt Aron	TKO	6 (10)	Jun 26, 1939	Marigold Gardens Outdoor Arena, Chicago, Illinois, U.S.	
166	Win	137–20–9	Tippy Larkin	PTS	10	Jun 6, 1939	Belmont Park, Garfield, New Jersey, U.S.	
165	Win	136–20–9	Marine Bunker	TKO	9 (12)	Apr 10, 1939	Hamilton, Bermuda	Won vacant Bermuda welterweight title
164	Win	135–20–9	Pete Galiano	PTS	8	Apr 4, 1939	Broadway Arena, Brooklyn, New York City, New York, U.S.	
163	Loss	134–20–9	Pedro Montañez	TKO	5 (10)	Mar 10, 1939	Hippodrome, Manhattan, New York City, New York, U.S.	
162	Loss	134–19–9	Quentin Breese	PTS	10	Feb 3, 1939	Legion Stadium, Hollywood, California, U.S.	
161	Win	134–18–9	Frankie Cavanna	PTS	8	Nov 22, 1938	Broadway Arena, Brooklyn, New York City, New York, U.S.	
160	Win	133–18–9	Joey Greb	PTS	8	Oct 25, 1938	New York Coliseum, Bronx, New York City, New York, U.S.	
159	Win	132–18–9	Johnny McHale	PTS	8	Oct 11, 1938	Broadway Arena, Brooklyn, New York City, New York, U.S.	
158	Win	131–18–9	Pete Caracciola	PTS	8	Aug 5, 1938	Coney Island Velodrome, Brooklyn, New York City, New York, U.S.	
157	Loss	130–18–9	Freddie 'Red' Cochrane	PTS	10	Jul 25, 1938	Meadowbrook Bowl, Newark, New Jersey, U.S.	
156	Win	130–17–9	Johnny McHale	PTS	8	Jul 12, 1938	Canarsie Stadium, Brooklyn, New York City, New York, U.S.	
155	Win	129–17–9	Johnny Horstmann	PTS	8	Jun 30, 1938	Dexter Park Arena, Woodhaven, Queens, New York City, New York, U.S.	
154	Draw	128–17–9	Augie Arellano	PTS	8	Jun 15, 1938	Queensboro Arena, Long Island City, Queens, New York City, New York, U.S.	
153	Win	128–17–8	Johnny McHale	PTS	8	Jun 7, 1938	Canarsie Stadium, Brooklyn, New York City, New York, U.S.	
152	Win	127–17–8	Ray Napolitano	UD	8	May 3, 1938	Broadway Arena, Brooklyn, New York City, New York, U.S.	
151	Win	126–17–8	Johnny Horstmann	PTS	8	Apr 9, 1938	Ridgewood Grove, Brooklyn, New York City, New York, U.S.	
150	Win	125–17–8	Frankie Wallace	PTS	8	Mar 29, 1938	Broadway Arena, Brooklyn, New York City, New York, U.S.	
149	Win	124–17–8	Vince Pimpinella	PTS	10	Mar 15, 1938	Broadway Arena, Brooklyn, New York City, New York, U.S.	
148	Win	123–17–8	Larry Anzalone	PTS	8	Mar 5, 1938	Ridgewood Grove, Brooklyn, New York City, New York, U.S.	
147	Win	122–17–8	Silvio Zangrillo	TKO	4 (8)	Feb 19, 1938	Ridgewood Grove, Brooklyn, New York City, New York, U.S.	
146	Win	121–17–8	Leo Phillips	PTS	10	Dec 13, 1937	Embassy Rink, Birmingham, West Midlands, England	
145	Win	120–17–8	Charlie Chetwin	TKO	2 (10)	Dec 6, 1937	King's Hall, Belle Vue, Manchester, Lancashire, England	
144	Loss	119–17–8	George Odwell	TKO	7 (12)	Nov 1, 1937	Earls Court Empress Hall, Kensington, London, England	
143	Win	119–16–8	Jake Kilrain	TKO	5 (10)	Oct 4, 1937	NSC, Earls Court Empress Stadium, Kensington, London, England	Not to be confused with Jake Kilrain
142	Draw	118–16–8	Jack Lewis	PTS	10	Aug 14, 1937	Poole Sports Arena, Poole, Dorset, England	
141	Win	118–16–7	Alby Day	PTS	8	May 6, 1937	Harringay Arena, Harringay, London, England	
140	Win	117–16–7	Pat Haley	TKO	5 (10)	Apr 11, 1937	Skating Rink, Cricklewood, London, England	
139	Draw	116–16–7	Louis Saerens	PTS	10	Mar 22, 1937	Colston Hall, Bristol, Avon, England	
138	Win	116–16–6	Harry Mason	TKO	3 (10)	Feb 21, 1937	The Ring, Blackfriars Road, Southwark, London, England	
137	Win	115–16–6	George Purchase	RTD	6 (12)	Feb 11, 1937	Romford Road Baths, West Ham, London, England	
136	Win	114–16–6	Pat Haley	DQ	3 (10)	Feb 7, 1937	The Ring, Blackfriars Road, Southwark, London, England	Haley disqualified for low blows
135	Win	113–16–6	Ivor Pickens	PTS	10	Jan 24, 1937	The Ring, Blackfriars Road, Southwark, London, England	
134	Loss	112–16–6	Aldo Spoldi	TKO	2 (10)	Jul 22, 1936	Ebbets Field, Brooklyn, New York City, New York, U.S.	
133	Loss	112–15–6	Jimmy Walsh	TKO	9 (15)	Apr 24, 1936	The Stadium, Liverpool, Merseyside, England	Lost BBBfoC British lightweight title
132	Loss	112–14–6	Laurie Stevens	PTS	12	Jan 11, 1936	Wanderers Stadium, Johannesburg, Gauteng, Union of South Africa	For vacant Commonwealth lightweight title
131	Win	112–13–6	Pat Butler	TKO	4 (12)	Nov 14, 1935	West Ham Baths, West Ham, London, England	
130	Win	111–13–6	Peter McKinley	PTS	10	Oct 21, 1935	The Ring, Blackfriars Road, Southwark, London, England	
129	Win	110–13–6	Harry Brown	KO	3 (10)	May 19, 1935	The Ring, Blackfriars Road, Southwark, London, England	
128	Loss	109–13–6	Gustave Humery	PTS	10	Apr 1, 1935	Royal Albert Hall, Kensington, London, England	
127	Loss	109–12–6	Gustave Humery	PTS	10	Feb 25, 1935	Palais des Sports, Paris, Paris, France	
126	Win	109–11–6	Gustave Humery	TKO	8 (10)	Jan 21, 1935	Royal Albert Hall, Kensington, London, England	
125	Win	108–11–6	Fred Bastin	TKO	4 (10)	Dec 2, 1934	The Ring, Blackfriars Road, Southwark, London, England	
124	Win	107–11–6	Harry Mizler	RTD	10 (15)	Oct 29, 1934	Royal Albert Hall, Kensington, London, England	Won BBBofC British lightweight title
123	Win	106–11–6	Nicolas Wilke	TKO	9 (10)	Sep 30, 1934	The Ring, Blackfriars Road, Southwark, London, England	
122	Win	105–11–6	Joe Kerr	RTD	6 (10)	Jul 10, 1934	Celtic Park Stadium, Glasgow, Scotland	
121	Loss	104–11–6	Jimmy Stewart	TKO	3 (12)	May 31, 1934	The Stadium, Liverpool, Merseyside, England	
120	Win	104–10–6	Len Wickwar	DQ	6 (12)	May 14, 1934	Granby Halls, Leicester, Leicestershire, England	
119	Win	103–10–6	Jackie Flynn	PTS	12	Apr 29, 1934	The Ring, Blackfriars Road, Southwark, London, England	
118	Loss	102–10–6	Cleto Locatelli	PTS	10	Jan 12, 1934	Madison Square Garden, Manhattan, New York City, New York, U.S.	
117	Loss	102–9–6	Tony Falco	PTS	10	Oct 19, 1933	Broadway Arena, Brooklyn, New York City, New York, U.S.	
116	Win	102–8–6	Harry Wallace	TKO	4 (8)	Oct 7, 1933	Ridgewood Grove, Brooklyn, New York City, New York, U.S.	
115	Win	101–8–6	Eugene Drouhin	TKO	9 (15)	Jul 12, 1933	White City Stadium, White City, London, England	
114	Win	100–8–6	George Rose	TKO	5 (15)	Jul 8, 1933	Vetch Field, Swansea, Wales	
113	Win	99–8–6	Louis Saerens	KO	4 (15)	May 28, 1933	Speedway Stadium, Lea Bridge, London, England	
112	Loss	98–8–6	Cleto Locatelli	PTS	10	Apr 27, 1933	Royal Albert Hall, Kensington, London, England	
111	Win	98–7–6	Kid Chocolate	MD	15	Jul 18, 1932	Madison Square Garden Bowl, Long Island City, Queens, New York City, New York, U.S.	
110	Win	97–7–6	Mike Sarko	PTS	6	Jun 29, 1932	Island Park Stadium, Long Beach, New York, U.S.	
109	Loss	96–7–6	Sammy Fuller	SD	12	May 20, 1932	Madison Square Garden, Manhattan, New York City, New York, U.S.	Lost world light-welterweight title claim
108	Draw	96–6–6	Sammy Fuller	PTS	10	Apr 1, 1932	Madison Square Garden, Manhattan, New York City, New York, U.S.	
107	Win	96–6–5	Buster Brown	PTS	10	Mar 21, 1932	St. Nicholas Arena, Manhattan, New York City, New York, U.S.	
106	Win	95–6–5	Marius Baudry	TKO	5 (15)	Dec 14, 1931	Royal Albert Hall, Kensington, London, England	Retained The Ring light-welterweight title
105	Loss	94–6–5	Tony Canzoneri	UD	15	Sep 10, 1931	Polo Grounds, Manhattan, New York City, New York, U.S.	For NBA, NYSAC, and The Ring lightweight titles; For NBA light-welterweight title
104	Win	94–5–5	Jimmy McNamara	PTS	10	Aug 4, 1931	Queensboro Stadium, Long Island City, Queens, New York City, New York, U.S.	Retained The Ring light-welterweight title
103	Win	93–5–5	Philly Griffin	PTS	10	Jul 27, 1931	Dreamland Park, Newark, New Jersey, U.S.	Retained The Ring light-welterweight title
102	Win	92–5–5	Teddy Watson	KO	7 (10)	Jul 24, 1931	Jersey City, New Jersey, U.S.	Retained The Ring light-welterweight title
101	Win	91–5–5	Tony Lambert	TKO	4 (8)	Jun 22, 1931	Dreamland Park, Newark, New Jersey, U.S.	Retained The Ring light-welterweight title
100	Win	90–5–5	Ray Kiser	PTS	10	May 18, 1931	Meyers Bowl, North Braddock, Pennsylvania, U.S.	Retained The Ring light-welterweight title
99	Win	89–5–5	Tony Herrera	PTS	10	May 8, 1931	Madison Square Garden, Manhattan, New York City, New York, U.S.	
98	Loss	88–5–5	Tony Canzoneri	KO	3 (10)	Apr 24, 1931	Chicago Stadium, Chicago, Illinois, U.S.	Lost NBA light-welterweight title; For NBA, NYSAC, and The Ring lightweight titles
97	Win	88–4–5	Billy Wallace	UD	10	Apr 10, 1931	Olympia Stadium, Detroit, Michigan, U.S.	Retained NBA and The Ring light-welterweight titles
96	Win	87–4–5	Herman Perlick	UD	10	Jan 30, 1931	Madison Square Garden, Manhattan, New York City, New York, U.S.	Retained NBA and The Ring light-welterweight titles
95	Win	86–4–5	Goldie Hess	UD	10	Jan 23, 1931	Chicago Stadium, Chicago, Illinois, U.S.	Retained NBA and The Ring light-welterweight titles
94	Win	85–4–5	Billy Petrolle	UD	10	Oct 10, 1930	Madison Square Garden, Manhattan, New York City, New York, U.S.	Retained NBA and The Ring light-welterweight titles
93	Win	84–4–5	Joe Glick	PTS	10	Sep 18, 1930	Queensboro Stadium, Long Island City, Queens, New York City, New York, U.S.	Retained NBA and The Ring light-welterweight titles
92	Win	83–4–5	Buster Brown	PTS	10	Sep 3, 1930	Dreamland Park, Newark, New Jersey, U.S.	Retained NBA and The Ring light-welterweight titles
91	Win	82–4–5	Kid Chocolate	SD	10	Aug 7, 1930	Polo Grounds, Manhattan, New York City, New York, U.S.	
90	Win	81–4–5	Henry Perlick	PTS	10	Jul 10, 1930	Dreamland Park, Newark, New Jersey, U.S.	
89	Win	80–4–5	Herman Perlick	UD	10	Jun 11, 1930	Queensboro Stadium, Long Island City, Queens, New York City, New York, U.S.	
88	Win	79–4–5	Al Delmont	TKO	4 (10)	May 29, 1930	Dreamland Park, Newark, New Jersey, U.S.	Retained NBA and The Ring light-welterweight titles
87	Win	78–4–5	Jackie Phillips	PTS	10	Apr 7, 1930	Coliseum, Toronto, Ontario, Canada	
86	Win	77–4–5	Joe Glick	UD	10	Apr 4, 1930	Madison Square Garden, Manhattan, New York City, New York, U.S.	Retained NBA and The Ring light-welterweight titles
85	Win	76–4–5	Mushy Callahan	TKO	10 (15)	Feb 18, 1930	Royal Albert Hall, Kensington, London, England	Won NBA and The Ring light-welterweight titles
84	Win	75–4–5	Tony Canzoneri	SD	10	Jan 17, 1930	Madison Square Garden, Manhattan, New York City, New York, U.S.	
83	Win	74–4–5	Tony Caragliano	DQ	2 (10)	Dec 18, 1929	New York Coliseum, Bronx, New York City, New York, U.S.	
82	Win	73–4–5	Artie DeLuca	PTS	6	Nov 30, 1929	Ridgewood Grove, Brooklyn, New York City, New York, U.S.	
81	Win	72–4–5	Eddie Elkins	PTS	10	Nov 18, 1929	St. Nicholas Arena, Manhattan, New York City, New York, U.S.	
80	Win	71–4–5	Tommy Gervel	KO	2 (10)	Nov 2, 1929	Olympia Boxing Club, Manhattan, New York City, New York, U.S.	
79	Win	70–4–5	Bruce Flowers	PTS	10	Oct 21, 1929	Madison Square Garden, Manhattan, New York City, New York, U.S.	
78	Win	69–4–5	Phil McGraw	PTS	10	Sep 30, 1929	St. Nicholas Arena, Manhattan, New York City, New York, U.S.	
77	Win	68–4–5	Georgie Balduc	DQ	2 (10)	Sep 16, 1929	Dexter Park Arena, Woodhaven, Queens, New York City, New York, U.S.	
76	Win	67–4–5	Spug Myers	PTS	10	Aug 29, 1929	Polo Grounds, Manhattan, New York City, New York, U.S.	
75	Win	66–4–5	Harry Wallace	TKO	9 (10)	Aug 19, 1929	Dexter Park Arena, Woodhaven, Queens, New York City, New York, U.S.	
74	Win	65–4–5	Joe Trabon	TKO	5 (10)	Aug 5, 1929	Dexter Park Arena, Woodhaven, Queens, New York City, New York, U.S.	
73	Win	64–4–5	Mushy Callahan	UD	10	Jul 24, 1929	Ebbets Field, Brooklyn, New York City, New York, U.S.	
72	Win	63–4–5	Herman Perlick	PTS	10	Jul 12, 1929	Mills Stadium, Chicago, Illinois, U.S.	
71	Draw	62–4–5	Stanislaus Loayza	PTS	10	Jun 11, 1929	Queensboro Stadium, Long Island City, Queens, New York City, New York, U.S.	
70	Win	62–4–4	Bruce Flowers	PTS	10	May 23, 1929	Madison Square Garden, Manhattan, New York City, New York, U.S.	
69	Win	61–4–4	Bruce Flowers	PTS	10	May 10, 1929	Madison Square Garden, Manhattan, New York City, New York, U.S.	
68	Win	60–4–4	Lucien Vinez	PTS	12	Jan 31, 1929	Royal Albert Hall, Kensington, London, England	
67	Win	59–4–4	Alf Mancini	PTS	15	Dec 6, 1928	Royal Albert Hall, Kensington, London, England	
66	Win	58–4–4	Spug Myers	DQ	3 (10)	Oct 8, 1928	White City Arena, Chicago, Illinois, U.S.	Myers was disqualified for hitting low
65	Loss	57–4–4	Billy Petrolle	TKO	5 (10)	Aug 24, 1928	Mills Stadium, Chicago, Illinois, U.S.	
64	Draw	57–3–4	Billy Petrolle	PTS	10	Jul 26, 1928	Mills Stadium, Chicago, Illinois, U.S.	
63	Win	57–3–3	Mike Watters	TKO	9 (10)	Jul 12, 1928	Mills Stadium, Chicago, Illinois, U.S.	
62	Win	56–3–3	Freddie Mueller	PTS	10	Jun 14, 1928	Mills Stadium, Chicago, Illinois, U.S.	
61	Win	55–3–3	Johnny Mellow	PTS	10	Jun 7, 1928	Olympia Stadium, Detroit, Michigan, U.S.	
60	Win	54–3–3	Pedro Amador	PTS	10	May 31, 1928	Mills Stadium, Chicago, Illinois, U.S.	
59	Win	53–3–3	Jack Donn	DQ	10 (15)	Feb 27, 1928	Queens Hall, Langham Place, London, England	
58	Win	52–3–3	Lucien Vinez	PTS	12	Dec 4, 1927	Premierland, Whitechapel, London, England	
57	Win	51–3–3	Vittorio Venturi	PTS	10	Nov 7, 1927	Queen's Hall, London, England	
56	Win	50–3–3	Raymond Jansen	DQ	7 (15)	Oct 11, 1927	The Peoples' Palace, Mile End, London, England	
55	Win	49–3–3	Jackie Kirk	KO	13 (15)	Sep 29, 1927	Premierland, Whitechapel, London, England	
54	Win	48–3–3	Robert Sirvain	TKO	6 (15)	Sep 18, 1927	Premierland, Whitechapel, London, England	
53	Win	47–3–3	Bob Miller	TKO	6 (15)	May 29, 1927	Premierland, Whitechapel, London, England	
52	Win	46–3–3	Alf Simmons	DQ	15 (15)	Apr 21, 1927	Olympia, Kensington, London, England	
51	Win	45–3–3	Paul Fritsch	TKO	8 (15)	Feb 27, 1927	Premierland, Whitechapel, London, England	
50	Win	44–3–3	Joe Clares	PTS	15	Jan 23, 1927	Premierland, Whitechapel, London, England	
49	Win	43–3–3	Walter Wright	TKO	2 (15)	Jan 13, 1927	Premierland, Whitechapel, London, England	
48	Win	42–3–3	Louis Saerens	DQ	9 (15)	Dec 19, 1926	Premierland, Whitechapel, London, England	
47	Win	41–3–3	Billy Gilmore	RTD	8 (15)	Nov 21, 1926	Premierland, Whitechapel, London, England	
46	Win	40–3–3	Phil Bond	PTS	15	Oct 10, 1926	Premierland, Whitechapel, London, England	
45	Win	39–3–3	Harry Corbett	PTS	15	Aug 29, 1926	Premierland, Whitechapel, London, England	
44	Win	38–3–3	Paul Gay	TKO	6 (15)	Jul 26, 1926	Premierland, Whitechapel, London, England	
43	Win	37–3–3	Henri Hébrans	TKO	5 (15)	Jul 8, 1926	Premierland, Whitechapel, London, England	
42	Win	36–3–3	André Routis	DQ	3 (15)	Jun 21, 1926	Royal Albert Hall, Kensington, London, England	
41	Win	35–3–3	Mick Hill	PTS	15	May 16, 1926	Premierland, Whitechapel, London, England	
40	Draw	34–3–3	Harry Corbett	PTS	15	Apr 26, 1926	The Ring, Blackfriars Road, Southwark, London, England	
39	Win	34–3–2	André Routis	PTS	15	Mar 18, 1926	Royal Albert Hall, Kensington, London, England	
38	Loss	33–3–2	Harry Corbett	PTS	15	Feb 11, 1926	Royal Albert Hall, Kensington, London, England	
37	Win	33–2–2	Battling van Dijk	PTS	15	Nov 26, 1925	Premierland, Whitechapel, London, England	
36	Win	32–2–2	Ernie Swash	DQ	2 (15)	Nov 12, 1925	Premierland, Whitechapel, London, England	
35	Win	31–2–2	Johnny Curley	PTS	15	Oct 29, 1925	Premierland, Whitechapel, London, England	
34	Win	30–2–2	Johnny Cuthbert	RTD	11 (15)	Oct 15, 1925	Premierland, Whitechapel, London, England	
33	Win	29–2–2	Norm Radford	KO	14 (15)	Sep 10, 1925	Premierland, Whitechapel, London, England	
32	Win	28–2–2	Johnny Britton	PTS	15	Aug 30, 1925	Premierland, Whitechapel, London, England	
31	Win	27–2–2	Fred Green	PTS	15	Aug 20, 1925	Premierland, Whitechapel, London, England	
30	Win	26–2–2	Fred Green	PTS	15	Aug 6, 1925	Premierland, Whitechapel, London, England	
29	Win	25–2–2	George Green	TKO	11 (15)	Jul 26, 1925	Premierland, Whitechapel, London, England	
28	Win	24–2–2	Joe Samuels	PTS	15	Jul 16, 1925	Premierland, Whitechapel, London, England	
27	Win	23–2–2	Jack Slattery	PTS	15	Jun 28, 1925	Premierland, Whitechapel, London, England	Points win, not a 9th rnd TKO as displayed on Boxrec.com
26	Loss	22–2–2	Johnny Cuthbert	PTS	15	Jun 18, 1925	Premierland, Whitechapel, London, England	
25	Win	22–1–2	Billy Sheppard	TKO	13 (15)	Jun 7, 1925	Premierland, Whitechapel, London, England	
24	Win	21–1–2	Kid Lewis	TKO	10 (15)	May 21, 1925	Premierland, Whitechapel, London, England	
23	Win	20–1–2	George Davis	DQ	8 (15)	Apr 19, 1925	Premierland, Whitechapel, London, England	
22	Win	19–1–2	Sid Carter	PTS	15	Apr 6, 1925	Premierland, Whitechapel, London, England	
21	Loss	18–1–2	Johnny Cuthbert	PTS	15	Mar 12, 1925	Premierland, Whitechapel, London, England	
20	Win	18–0–2	Billy Streets	TKO	9 (15)	Feb 26, 1925	Premierland, Whitechapel, London, England	
19	Win	17–0–2	Arthur Lloyd	TKO	15 (15)	Feb 9, 1925	Premierland, Whitechapel, London, England	
18	Win	16–0–2	Billy Streets	PTS	15	Jan 26, 1925	Premierland, Whitechapel, London, England	
17	Win	15–0–2	Albert Colcombe	TKO	13 (15)	Jan 8, 1925	Premierland, Whitechapel, London, England	
16	Win	14–0–2	Billy Colebourne	TKO	6 (15)	Dec 26, 1924	Premierland, Whitechapel, London, England	
15	Win	13–0–2	Arthur Lloyd	PTS	10	Dec 15, 1924	Premierland, Whitechapel, London, England	
14	Win	12–0–2	Bert Saunders	TKO	14 (15)	Dec 11, 1924	Premierland, Whitechapel, London, England	
13	Win	11–0–2	Teddy Shepherd	TKO	9 (10)	Dec 7, 1924	Premierland, Whitechapel, London, England	
12	Win	10–0–2	Fred Patten	PTS	15	Nov 27, 1924	Premierland, Whitechapel, London, England	
11	Win	9–0–2	Harry Miller	TKO	6 (10)	Nov 20, 1924	Premierland, Whitechapel, London, England	
10	Win	8–0–2	Jimmy Wooder	PTS	10	Nov 10, 1924	Premierland, Whitechapel, London, England	
9	Win	7–0–2	Young Clancy	PTS	15	Nov 3, 1924	Premierland, Whitechapel, London, England	
8	Win	6–0–2	Albert Hicks	PTS	10	Oct 16, 1924	Premierland, Whitechapel, London, England	
7	Draw	5–0–2	Jimmy Wooder	PTS	10	Oct 2, 1924	Premierland, Whitechapel, London, England	
6	Win	5–0–1	Teddy Pullen	KO	1 (10)	Sep 21, 1924	Premierland, Whitechapel, London, England	
5	Win	4–0–1	Billy Clarke	PTS	10	Aug 21, 1924	Premierland, Whitechapel, London, England	
4	Draw	3–0–1	Billy Clarke	PTS	10	Aug 3, 1924	Premierland, Whitechapel, London, England	
3	Win	3–0	Sid Lyons	TKO	3 (10)	Jul 20, 1924	Premierland, Whitechapel, London, England	
2	Win	2–0	Charlie Harwood	TKO	7 (10)	Jul 7, 1924	Premierland, Whitechapel, London, England	
1	Win	1–0	Johnnie Gordon	TKO	8 (10)	Jun 8, 1924	Premierland, Whitechapel, London, England	

== See also ==
- List of light welterweight boxing champions
- List of British lightweight boxing champions
- List of select Jewish boxers
- Stepney Historical Trust

== Sources ==
- Harold Finch The Tower Hamlets Connection – a Biographical Guide Stepney Books ISBN 0-902385-25-9
- The Whitechapel Windmill by John Harding with Jack Kid Berg 1987, Robson Books

Achievements
Preceded by Mushy Callahan	World Light Welterweight Champion; 1930 Feb 18 – 1931 April 24	Succeeded by Tony Canzoneri
