= Al Singer =

American boxer (1909–1961)

Personal information
- Nickname: The Bronx Beauty
- Nationality: American
- Born: Abraham Singer; September 6, 1909 Lower East Side, New York City
- Died: April 20, 1961 (aged 51) New York, New York
- Height: 5 ft 4 1/2 in (1.638 m)
- Weight: Lightweight

Boxing career

Boxing record
- Total fights: 73
- Wins: 62
- Win by KO: 26
- Losses: 9
- Draws: 2

Al "The Bronx Beauty" Singer (September 6, 1909 – April 20, 1961) was an American boxer who won the Undisputed World Lightweight Championship in 1930.

== Early life and career ==
Singer was born in a tenement on Broome Street, part of the Jewish section in New York's Lower East Side on September 6, 1909. He was one of four sons and a daughter born to an ambitious ladies' garment entrepreneur who would keep his large family in America's middle class. One of his cousins was screenwriter Ray Singer. Singer, an all round athlete who loved basketball, was discovered by boxing trainers Harry Drucker and Hymie Caplan after his tenth amateur bout which included a great showing in his first outing against the New York State Bantamweight champion, Jimmy Cruze. As an amateur boxer, he won the Metropolitan AAU featherweight title. Singer had unsurpassed grace and a studied style in the ring, and he could punch with authority, but unlike the great lightweight Benny Leonard, to whom he was often compared, he could not take a strong punch and was considered to have a "glass jaw". His quick rise to fame, and equally quick demise could be explained by these competing characteristics.

=== Quick rise to boxing prominence ===
Debuting as a professional in Brooklyn with a knockout of Jim Reilly on July 2, 1927, Singer went undefeated in his first two years as a professional. His affectionate New York fans dubbed him "The Bronx Beauty" for both his looks and exceptional grace in the ring. Though Singer was young and had stayed far distant from crime, his exceptional winning record caught the eye of the New York mob, who hoped to bring him to a championship as quickly as possible. Most reference books on Singer noted that in 1928, two men came to his training camp and asked to meet with his manager Harry Drucker. Accepting a ride with the men, Drucker was never heard from again, and Singer came under the influence of the mob, who many believed fixed a few of his early fights. He performed exceptionally well against Lou Moscowitz at Madison Square Garden and Pete Zivic at St. Nicholas in late 1928, knocking them out in five and six rounds respectively. In his first real feature match on September 14, 1928, Singer and the exceptionally skilled Tony Canzoneri, former holder of the featherweight world title, battled to a 10-round draw, satisfying an impressed audience and spotlighting Singer as a potential feather or lightweight contender. In his career, Singer won 61 of 72 pro fights (25 by KO), drawing twice, and losing nine.

In February and March 1929, Singer faced former 1927 world bantamweight champion Bud Taylor at Madison Square Garden, winning in a fourth round disqualification and a ten-round points decision. In Singer's win by disqualification, Taylor landed a low left hook to the body, 52 seconds into the fourth, that caused Singer to drop to his knees in pain. The bout was fast, furious, and close in the opening rounds. In their ten-round bout on March 15, before 20,000 at the Garden, the fighting was close, but Taylor's attempts to end the bout with hooks to the body were not adequate to slow down Singer, who was permitted to land a few rights to the jaw of Taylor, gaining essential points in the closely scored bout.

In a non-title bout on July 24, 1929, before a crowd of around 29,000, Singer defeated Frenchman Andre Routis, reigning NBA world featherweight champion, in an impressive second-round technical knockout at Ebbetts Field in Brooklyn. Singer first floored the Frenchman with a count of five from a right to the jaw preceded by a right left combination, that was followed by a count of three with another right after Routis resumed boxing. On his third trip to the canvas, the referee called a technical knockout.

==== Loss to Kid Chocolate, August, 1929 ====
On August 29, 1929, Singer lost an important twelve round bout with Black Cuban boxer Kid Chocolate, at the Polo Grounds in New York with 50,000 in attendance. It was a swift, clean fight that featured no knockdowns, but studied technique and style. In the fifth and the eighth, Chocolate landed two powerful rights to the head of Singer that nearly staggered him, but he stayed on his feet. In the second and eleventh, Singer boxed Chocolate around the ring, but at the end of each round Chocolate answered with a flurry of his own. Singer appeared better in the early rounds, and was the aggressor particularly in the second, fourth and fifth. In the seventh, eighth and ninth, Chocolate rallied, using his right with enough effect to gain a points advantage from which Singer could not recover. Chocolate clearly took the twelfth, conceding the tenth by a hair to Singer. The decision was unpopular with the New York crowd, who may have been aware that Chocolate effectively blocked a large number of the blows that Singer appeared to land. Chocolate let Singer take the lead, slowly wearing him down, and using his best defense against him.

== Capturing the world lightweight championship against Sammy Mandell, July 1930 ==
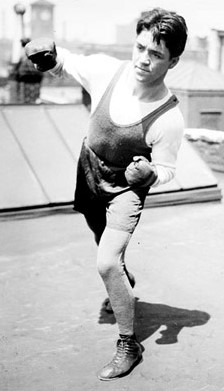
Sammy Mandell, lightweight champ

Singer captured the World Lightweight Championship on July 17, 1930, before a crowd of 35,000 at Yankee Stadium, with a first-round knockout (1:46) of champion Sammy Mandell. Though both boxers started the match boxing cautiously, Singer dropped Mandell with a left hook to the jaw in less than a minute of fighting. Three more times Mandell went down to the mat for short counts, scarcely able to raise his hands in defense. The final knockdown came with a crushing one two punch to the jaw. Mandell had defended his four-year claim to the lightweight crown only a few times, and claimed that the weight loss required to make weight had sapped his strength.

=== Devastating loss to Jimmy McLarnin, September 1930 ===
Against the better judgement of many, Singer accepted a non-title bout with boxing sensation Jimmy McLarnin before a crowd of around 25,000 on September 2, 1930. McLarnin flattened Singer in the third round with a right to the jaw. Although Singer fought well in the opening round, dropping his opponent for an instant from a right, he foolishly decided to fight toe to toe with the stronger McLarnin in the third round. McLarnin had at least a five-pound advantage, and a small but significant advantage in reach. A lightning right to the jaw dropped Singer for a count of nine. When he arose and went into a brief clinch, McLarnin threw a left hook to the jaw to counter a right from Singer that missed, and Singer went down for the count. A Doctor at the scene, who inspected Singer, said the blow may have affected his upper spine and caused a momentary partial paralysis, not uncharacteristic of a knockout.

=== Upset loss of the world lightweight championship to Tony Canzoneri, November 1930 ===
He surrendered the title on November 14, 1930 to Tony Canzoneri in a knockout only 1:06 into the first round. Many believe Singer should have taken more than two months to recover from the bruising loss he took from McLarnin the previous September. The upset came as Singer was designated the early betting favorite at 12-5. Coming out of a clinch, Canzoneri threw a left hook to Singer's mouth, and then one to his chin which snapped back his head, and put him down for the count. Singer was unable to come to his feet without collapsing.

Recovering from his loss of the title on June 18, 1931, Singer defeated Lew Massey before a crowd of 6,395, at Madison Square Garden in a ten-round points decision. Observing how he threw jabs and punches nearly at will, the Associated Press gave Singer eight of ten rounds, allowing Massey only the seventh when he switched to infighting. Singer scored with hard rights in the tenth. Other reporters considered the boxing fairly close, noting that with his reach, height, and weight advantage, Singer should have won more decisively.

== Loss to world featherweight champion Battling Battalino, December 1931 ==
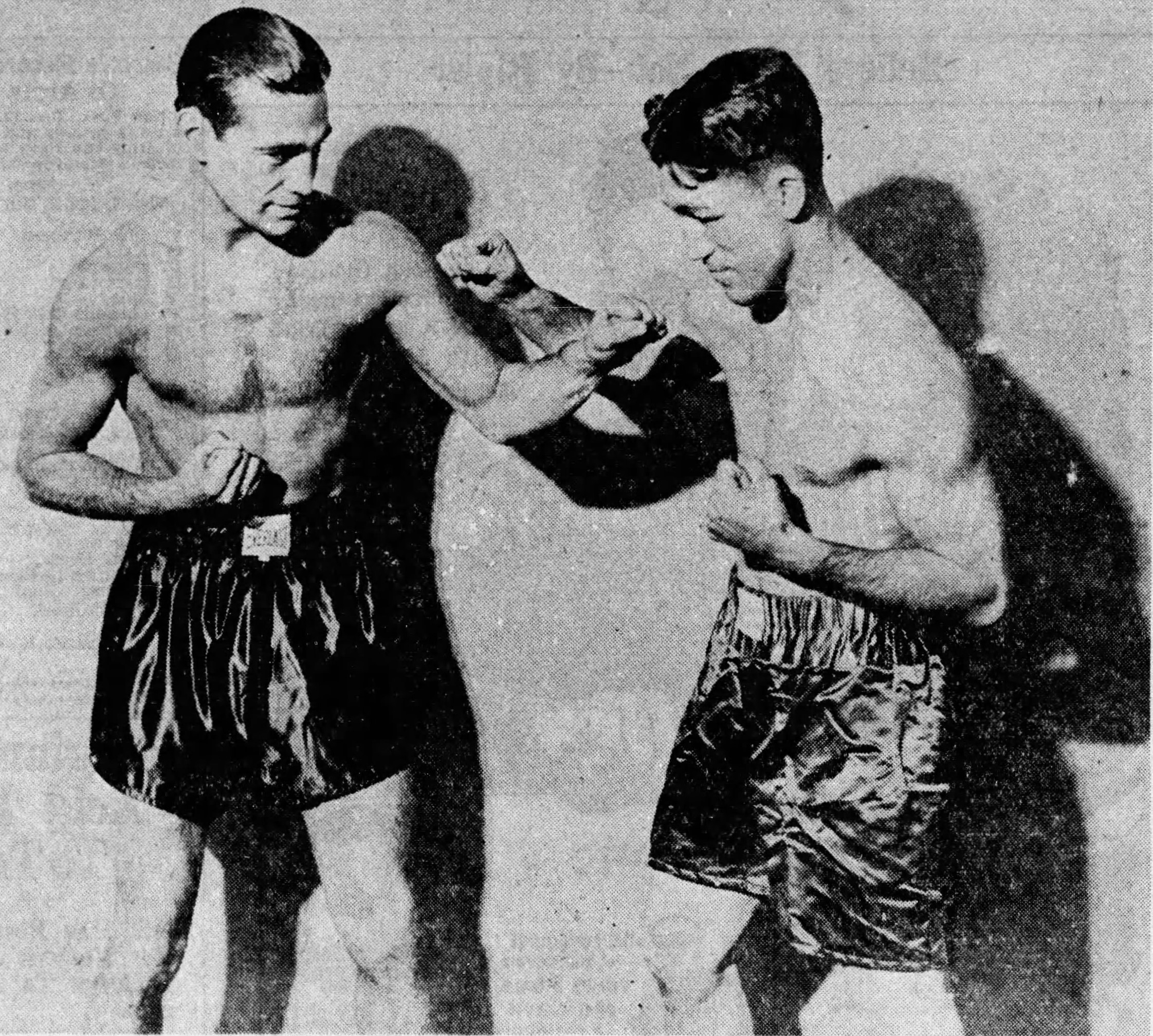
Bat Battalino and Al Singer at a weigh-in before their December 1931 match

Singer lost decisively to Battling Battalino, reigning New York State Athletic Commission (NYSAC) world featherweight champion, before a crowd of 17,000 at New York's Madison Square Garden on December 11, 1931. Battalino may have bobbed and weaved away from Singer's early volleys in the first, and was likely shaken by a blow or two, but his counterattack was devastating to Singer. Though Singer started strong very early in the opening round, he was soon put down three times by Battalino, and went down in the second from a series of rights to the chin for a count of seven. After he rose, he was chased around the ring by Battalino who put him down again with a right to the chin for a count of four, just before the referee justifiably called the bout a technical knockout and helped move Singer to his corner. Singer's retreat from Battalino after he was first put down, his inability to defend himself, and his struggle to mount an attack, indicated a boxer who had, at least for the moment, lost most of his physical faculties. Both boxers were above the featherweight limit preventing any chance of the match being a featherweight title match. The match ended any of Singer's championship aspirations.

=== Attempted comeback, October–November 1935 ===
Four years later, Singer tried a comeback from October–November 1935 under a new manager, Leon See, winning four straight matches, but against strictly second rate opponents. He achieved a fourth-round technical knockout against Buckey Keyes on October 14, flooring his opponent in the second and third rounds. In a final victory, Singer retired after defeating Johnny Toomy on November 11 in a fifth-round technical knockout.

== Life after boxing ==
Singer served in WWII, fighting a number of exhibitions for the soldiers. He was stationed at Camp Upton in New York but received a medical discharge due to eye trouble. He married the former show girl Billy Boze in 1947. Having earned around a quarter million dollars from boxing in his lifetime, Singer tried various businesses in his thirties and forties including sales, restaurants, real estate, and theater, owning several Cabarets. He was appointed to a judgeship by the New York State Boxing Commission in 1955.

On April 20, 1961, he died of a heart attack in his New York City apartment at age 51. Singer, who was Jewish, was inducted into the International Jewish Sports Hall of Fame in 2006.

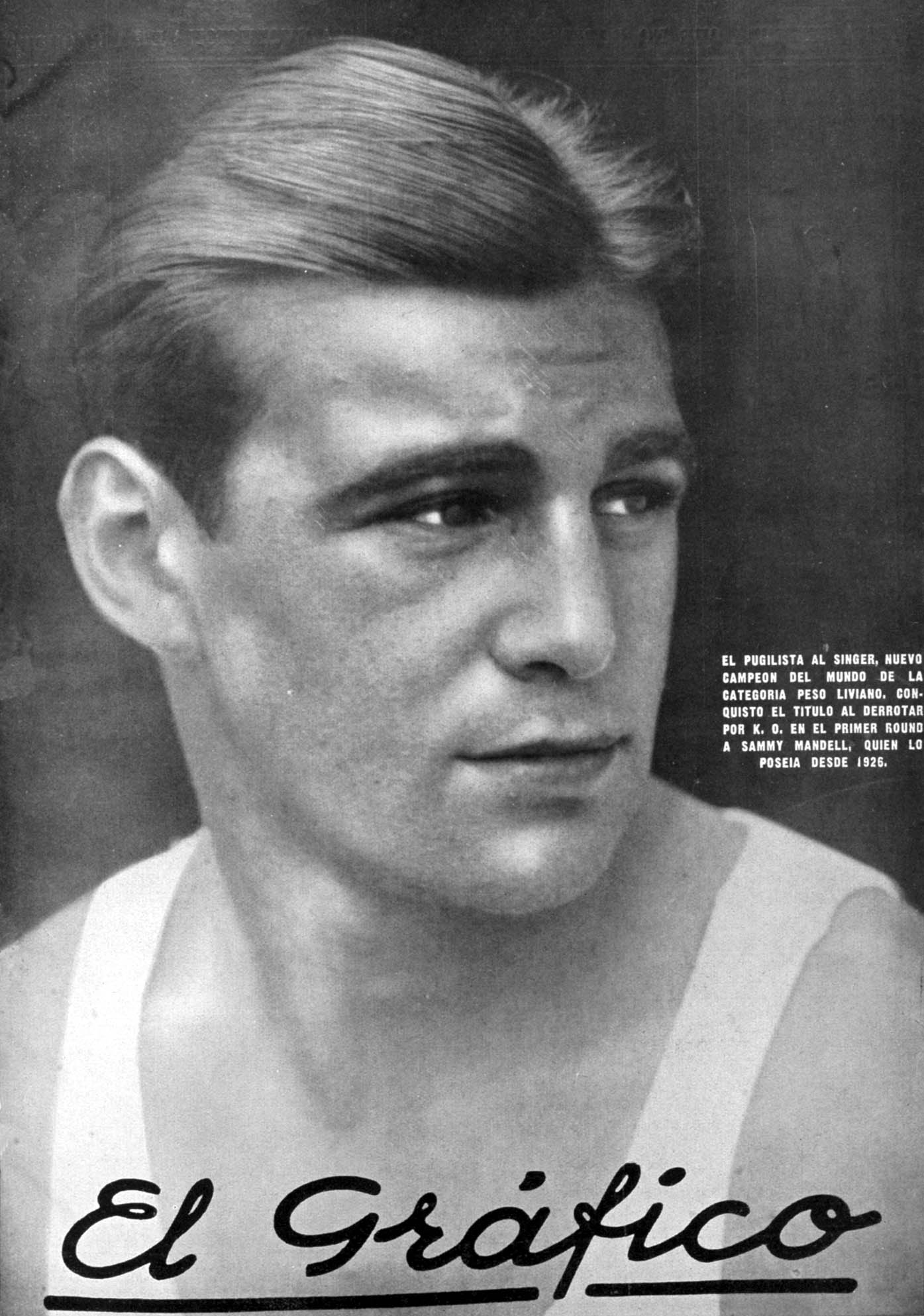
Al Singer in 1930

== Professional boxing record ==
73 fights	62 wins	9 losses
By knockout	26	4
By decision	34	5
By disqualification	2	0
Draws	2	

No.	Result	Record	Opponent	Type	Round(s), time	Date	Age	Location	Notes
73	Win	62–9–2	Johnny Toomey	TKO	5 (10)	Nov 11, 1935	29 years, 66 days	Laurel Garden, Newark, New Jersey, U.S.	
72	Win	61–9–2	Al Dunbar	TKO	1 (8), 2:10	Nov 7, 1935	29 years, 62 days	Westchester County Center, White Plains, New York, U.S.	
71	Win	60–9–2	Frankie Warno	PTS	10	Oct 21, 1935	29 years, 45 days	Arena, Trenton, New Jersey, U.S.	
70	Win	59–9–2	Bucky Keyes	TKO	4 (10)	Oct 14, 1935	29 years, 38 days	Laurel Garden, Newark, New Jersey, U.S.	
69	Loss	58–9–2	Christopher "Battling" Battalino	TKO	2 (10), 0:31	Dec 11, 1931	25 years, 96 days	Madison Square Garden, New York City, New York, U.S.	
68	Win	58–8–2	Tommy Crowley	PTS	8	Dec 1, 1931	25 years, 86 days	Columbus Hall, Yonkers, New York, U.S.	
67	Win	57–8–2	Johnny Gaito	PTS	10	Nov 16, 1931	25 years, 71 days	St. Nicholas Arena, New York City, New York, U.S.	
66	Win	56–8–2	Eddie Martin	TKO	2 (10)	Aug 28, 1931	24 years, 356 days	Coney Island Stadium, New York City, New York, U.S.	
65	Win	55–8–2	Eddie Shapiro	PTS	8	Jul 10, 1931	24 years, 307 days	Long Beach Stadium, Long Beach, New York, U.S.	
64	Win	54–8–2	Lew Massey	PTS	10	Jun 18, 1931	24 years, 285 days	Madison Square Garden, New York City, New York, U.S.	
63	Loss	53–8–2	Tony Canzoneri	KO	1 (15)	Nov 14, 1930	24 years, 69 days	Madison Square Garden, New York City, New York, U.S.	Lost NYSAC, NBA, and The Ring lightweight titles
62	Win	53–7–2	Eddie Mack	UD	10	Oct 14, 1930	24 years, 38 days	Chicago Stadium, Chicago, Illinois, U.S.	
61	Loss	52–7–2	Jimmy McLarnin	KO	3 (10)	Sep 11, 1930	24 years, 5 days	Yankee Stadium, New York City, New York, U.S.	
60	Win	52–6–2	Sammy Mandell	KO	1 (15), 1:46	Jul 17, 1930	23 years, 314 days	Yankee Stadium, New York City, New York, U.S.	Won NYSAC, NBA, and The Ring lightweight titles
59	Win	51–6–2	Ignacio Fernandez	PTS	10	May 23, 1930	23 years, 259 days	Madison Square Garden, New York City, New York, U.S.	
58	Win	50–6–2	Eddie Wagner	TKO	3 (10)	Mar 17, 1930	23 years, 192 days	St. Nicholas Arena, New York City, New York, U.S.	
57	Win	49–6–2	Stanislaus Loayza	UD	10	Jan 31, 1930	23 years, 147 days	Madison Square Garden, New York City, New York, U.S.	
56	Win	48–6–2	Georgie Day	TKO	3 (8), 2:08	Jan 13, 1930	23 years, 129 days	St. Nicholas Arena, New York City, New York, U.S.	
55	Win	47–6–2	Pete Nebo	TKO	4 (10)	Nov 29, 1929	23 years, 84 days	Madison Square Garden, New York City, New York, U.S.	
54	Win	46–6–2	Al "Rube" Goldberg	TKO	2 (6)	Nov 16, 1929	23 years, 71 days	Ridgewood Grove, New York City, New York, U.S.	
53	Win	45–6–2	Johnny Sheppard	TKO	7 (10)	Nov 11, 1929	23 years, 66 days	St. Nicholas Arena, New York City, New York, U.S.	
52	Win	44–6–2	Davey Abad	PTS	10	Oct 21, 1929	23 years, 45 days	Madison Square Garden, New York City, New York, U.S.	
51	Win	43–6–2	Leonard Zazzarino	TKO	6 (10), 1:44	Oct 11, 1929	23 years, 35 days	Madison Square Garden, New York City, New York, U.S.	
50	Loss	42–6–2	Kid Chocolate	SD	12	Aug 29, 1929	22 years, 357 days	Polo Grounds, New York City, New York, U.S.	
49	Win	42–5–2	Gaston Charles	KO	2 (10)	Aug 13, 1929	22 years, 341 days	Queensboro Stadium, New York City, New York, U.S.	
48	Win	41–5–2	André Routis	TKO	2 (10)	Jul 24, 1929	22 years, 321 days	Ebbets Field, New York City, New York, U.S.	
47	Win	40–5–2	Carl Duane	PTS	10	Jul 8, 1929	22 years, 305 days	Starlight Park, New York City, New York, U.S.	
46	Win	39–5–2	Dominick Petrone	PTS	10	Jun 26, 1929	22 years, 293 days	Queensboro Stadium, New York City, New York, U.S.	
45	Win	38–5–2	Augie Pisano	UD	10	Jun 17, 1929	22 years, 284 days	Dexter Park Arena, New York City, New York, U.S.	
44	Win	37–5–2	Leo "Kid" Roy	TKO	1 (10), 2:41	Jun 6, 1929	22 years, 273 days	New York Coliseum, New York City, New York, U.S.	
43	Loss	36–5–2	Ignacio Fernandez	KO	3 (10)	May 17, 1929	22 years, 253 days	Madison Square Garden, New York City, New York, U.S.	
42	Win	36–4–2	Patsy Ruffalo	PTS	10	Apr 19, 1929	22 years, 225 days	Olympia Stadium, Detroit, Michigan, U.S.	
41	Win	35–4–2	Charles "Bud" Taylor	PTS	10	Mar 15, 1929	22 years, 190 days	Madison Square Garden, New York City, New York, U.S.	
40	Win	34–4–2	Charles "Bud" Taylor	DQ	4 (10), 0:52	Feb 8, 1929	22 years, 155 days	Madison Square Garden, New York City, New York, U.S.	
39	Win	33–4–2	Sammy Novia	PTS	10	Jan 21, 1929	22 years, 137 days	Arena, Philadelphia, Pennsylvania, U.S.	
38	Win	32–4–2	Joe Ryder	PTS	10	Jan 14, 1929	22 years, 130 days	Broadway Arena, New York City, New York, U.S.	
37	Draw	31–4–2	Tony Canzoneri	MD	10	Dec 14, 1928	22 years, 99 days	Madison Square Garden, New York City, New York, U.S.	
36	Win	31–4–1	Peter Zivic	TKO	6 (10)	Dec 3, 1928	22 years, 88 days	St. Nicholas Arena, New York City, New York, U.S.	
35	Win	30–4–1	Lou Moscowitz	KO	5 (8), 2:02	Nov 16, 1928	22 years, 71 days	Madison Square Garden, New York City, New York, U.S.	
34	Win	29–4–1	Johnny Lawson	TKO	5 (8)	Nov 8, 1928	22 years, 63 days	St. Nicholas Arena, New York City, New York, U.S.	
33	Win	28–4–1	Al Tripoli	UD	6	Oct 22, 1928	22 years, 46 days	St. Nicholas Arena, New York City, New York, U.S.	
32	Win	27–4–1	Johnny Lawson	DQ	2 (6)	Oct 5, 1928	22 years, 29 days	Madison Square Garden, New York City, New York, U.S.	
31	Win	26–4–1	Chick Suggs	PTS	6	Sep 22, 1928	22 years, 16 days	Olympia Boxing Club, New York City, New York, U.S.	
30	Win	25–4–1	Vic Burrone	PTS	6	Sep 10, 1928	22 years, 4 days	St. Nicholas Arena, New York City, New York, U.S.	
29	Win	24–4–1	Smiling Springer	TKO	4 (6), 2:21	Aug 21, 1928	21 years, 350 days	Queensboro Stadium, New York City, New York, U.S.	
28	Win	23–4–1	Tony Pellegrino	PTS	6	Aug 13, 1928	21 years, 342 days	Dexter Park Arena, New York City, New York, U.S.	
27	Win	22–4–1	Pancho Dencio	TKO	3 (6)	Aug 3, 1928	21 years, 332 days	Long Beach Stadium, New York City, New York, U.S.	
26	Draw	21–4–1	Petey Mack	PTS	6	Jul 24, 1928	21 years, 322 days	Queensboro Stadium, New York City, New York, U.S.	
25	Win	21–4	Pete Herman	PTS	6	Jul 3, 1928	21 years, 301 days	Queensboro Stadium, New York City, New York, U.S.	
24	Win	20–4	Tommy Gervel	TKO	4 (6), 1:55	Jun 21, 1928	21 years, 289 days	Madison Square Garden, New York City, New York, U.S.	
23	Win	19–4	Petey Mack	PTS	6	Jun 11, 1928	21 years, 279 days	St. Nicholas Arena, New York City, New York, U.S.	
22	Win	18–4	George Nickfor	PTS	6	May 28, 1928	21 years, 265 days	St. Nicholas Arena, New York City, New York, U.S.	
21	Win	17–4	George Nickfor	TKO	3 (6)	May 14, 1928	21 years, 251 days	St. Nicholas Arena, New York City, New York, U.S.	
20	Win	16–4	Lew Hurley	PTS	6	Apr 18, 1928	21 years, 225 days	Manhattan Casino, New York City, New York, U.S.	
19	Win	15–4	Sonny Parson	KO	2 (6)	Apr 11, 1928	21 years, 218 days	Manhattan Casino, New York City, New York, U.S.	
18	Win	14–4	Joe Barbara	PTS	6	Apr 7, 1928	21 years, 214 days	Olympia Boxing Club, New York City, New York, U.S.	
17	Win	13–4	George Goldberg	PTS	6	Mar 17, 1928	21 years, 193 days	Ridgewood Grove, New York City, New York, U.S.	
16	Win	12–4	Joey Katkish	PTS	6	Mar 3, 1928	21 years, 179 days	Olympia Boxing Club, New York City, New York, U.S.	
15	Loss	11–4	Sammy Chernoff	PTS	6	Feb 4, 1928	21 years, 151 days	Olympia Boxing Club, New York City, New York, U.S.	
14	Win	11–3	Herman Wallace	PTS	6	Jan 14, 1928	21 years, 130 days	Ridgewood Grove, New York City, New York, U.S.	
13	Win	10–3	Harry Traub	KO	2 (6)	Dec 31, 1927	21 years, 116 days	Olympia Boxing Club, New York City, New York, U.S.	
12	Loss	9–3	George Goldberg	PTS	6	Dec 17, 1927	21 years, 102 days	Ridgewood Grove, New York City, New York, U.S.	
11	Loss	9–2	George Goldberg	PTS	6	Nov 12, 1927	21 years, 67 days	Ridgewood Grove, New York City, New York, U.S.	
10	Win	9–1	Tommy Brady	TKO	3 (6)	Nov 9, 1927	21 years, 64 days	Pioneer Sporting Club, New York City, New York, U.S.	
9	Win	8–1	Murray Fuchs	PTS	6	Oct 29, 1927	21 years, 53 days	Olympia Boxing Club, New York City, New York, U.S.	
8	Win	7–1	Guy Mastrion	PTS	6	Oct 22, 1927	21 years, 46 days	Ridgewood Grove, New York City, New York, U.S.	
7	Win	6–1	Sammy Chernoff	PTS	6	Oct 4, 1927	21 years, 28 days	St. Nicholas Arena, New York City, New York, U.S.	
6	Win	5–1	Tommy Rivetti	PTS	4	Sep 29, 1927	21 years, 23 days	Columbus Hall, Yonkers, New York, U.S.	
5	Win	4–1	Jim Reilly	KO	2 (4)	Sep 17, 1927	21 years, 11 days	Ridgewood Grove, New York City, New York, U.S.	
4	Win	3–1	Murray Fuchs	PTS	6	Aug 27, 1927	20 years, 355 days	Ridgewood Grove, New York City, New York, U.S.	
3	Loss	2–1	Joe Barbara	PTS	4	Aug 6, 1927	20 years, 334 days	Ridgewood Grove, New York City, New York, U.S.	
2	Win	2–0	Joe Salamone	PTS	4	Jul 30, 1927	20 years, 327 days	Ridgewood Grove, New York City, New York, U.S.	
1	Win	1–0	Jim Reilly	KO	3 (4)	Jul 2, 1927	20 years, 299 days	Ridgewood Grove, New York City, New York, U.S.	

== Titles in boxing ==
=== Major world titles ===
- NYSAC lightweight champion (135 lbs)
- NBA (WBA) lightweight champion (135 lbs)

=== The Ring magazine titles ===
- The Ring lightweight champion (135 lbs)

=== Undisputed titles ===
- Undisputed lightweight champion

== See also ==
- Lineal championship
- List of lightweight boxing champions
- List of select Jewish boxers

Achievements
Preceded by Sammy Mandell	World Lightweight Champion; July 17, 1930 – November 14, 1930	Succeeded by Tony Canzoneri
