= Christopher Battalino =

American boxer (1908–1977)

Battling Battalino

Personal information
- Nationality: American
- Born: Christopher Battaglia; February 18, 1908 Hartford, Connecticut
- Died: July 25, 1977 (aged 69) Hartford, Connecticut
- Height: 5 ft 5 1/2 in (1.66 m)
- Weight: Featherweight

Boxing career
- Reach: 65 in (165 cm)
- Stance: Orthodox

Boxing record
- Total fights: 88
- Wins: 57
- Win by KO: 23
- Losses: 26
- Draws: 3
- No contests: 2

Christopher Battaglia (February 18, 1908 – July 25, 1977) better known as Battling Battalino, was an American Undisputed Featherweight boxing champion. Born in Hartford, Connecticut, Battalino engaged in 88 bouts during his career, of which he won 57 (23 knockouts), lost 26, and drew 3. He was managed by Hy Malley and Lenny Marello. As of 2026, BoxRec ranked Battalino as the 24th-greatest featherweight boxer of all time. He was inducted into the International Boxing Hall of Fame in 2003.

== Early life and amateur boxing career ==
Christopher Battaglia was born on February 18, 1908, to an Italian family in Hartford, Connecticut. The son of Italian immigrants, he never attended high school, but worked in a typewriter factory and labored in the tobacco fields.

A good amateur boxer, Battalino won the National AAU featherweight championship in Boston in 1927. He had fifty-nine amateur bouts, knocking out forty-six of his opponents.

== Professional boxer ==
=== Taking the world featherweight championship from André Routis, September, 1929 ===
Battalino became a professional boxer in June 1927. His first big win came on July 26, 1929, when he upset NBA world bantamweight champion "Panama" Al Brown on a 10-round decision in Hartford, Connecticut. Battalino knocked Brown down for a short count in the third. He won the first four rounds, and held his own through the remaining six.

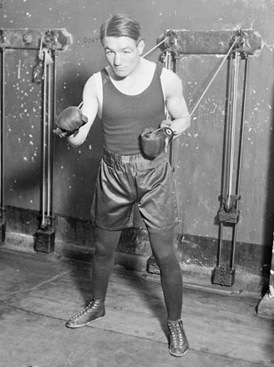
André Routis, world featherweight champion

The victory over Brown made Battalino a top contender and garnered him a title match with world featherweight champion André Routis on September 23, 1929, in his hometown, Hartford, Connecticut. The 21-year-old Battalino made the most of his opportunity and defeated Frenchman Routis over 15 rounds, becoming one of the youngest competitors to win the world featherweight title. Before an enthused audience of 13,866, Battalino outboxed and outsmarted the older Routis at both long range, and infighting, and landed more blows. In a rare occurrence, Battalino was awarded all fifteen of the rounds in the championship fight. The new champion had become a Hartford Hero when the Mayor presented him a medal the previous November for saving a child from drowning.

On April 25, 1930, Battalino defeated former world bantamweight champion Bushy Graham in a non-title fight before a crowd of 6,000, winning at least eight of the ten rounds in a points decision in Hartford, Connecticut. A stiff left hook in the fourth put Battalino to the mat for a count of eight, and Battalino piled up a comfortable points margin through the rest of the match. The referee scored nine rounds for Battalino. Graham had little chance to mount an effective offense against the continuous attack of Battalino, and his right was tied up blocking the left of Battalino. He made few effective blows with his left after his knockdown in the fourth. According to several sources, Graham took "one of the worst trouncings of his career". He had lost to former champion Graham on September 24, 1931, in a non-title split decision in Cincinnati, before later knocking out Graham on November 19, 1931, at Chicago Stadium 1:44 into the first round.

== World featherweight title defenses, 1930-31 ==
During the next two years, he successfully defended his crown by defeating Ignacio Fernandez, Earl Mastro, and Hall of Famers Kid Chocolate, Fidel LaBarba, and Freddie Miller.

On February 25, 1930, Battalino defeated Ignazio Fernandez in a ten-round points decision in Hartford, taking eight of ten rounds. He beat Fernandez again in a title match in East Hartford, Connecticut, with a fifth-round knockout, the first of Fernandez's career.

Battalino defeated Kid Chocolate in a fifteen-round unanimous decision before a crowd of 15,000 at Madison Square Garden for the NYSAC world featherweight championship on December 12, 1930. Battalino, who began as a 2–1 underdog, was down in the first round from a left and right to the chin for a count of nine, but made a comeback through the rest of the furious bout. As was his custom when boxing more skilled opponents, Battalino took the offensive, never giving his opponent room to fire effective counterpunches. In a close bout, the Associated Press gave Battalino eight rounds, with only seven to Chocolate. Battalino landed body blows against Chocolate to gain a points advantage in the eleventh through the fourteenth rounds, though Chocolate led the first two rounds as well as the eighth through tenth, and the final round by a shade.

Battalino convincingly defeated Hall of Famer Fidel LaBarba at Madison Square Garden before a crowd of 9,000 in a fifteen round Unanimous Decision on May 22, 1931. In the somewhat close NYSAC world featherweight title bout, Battalino brought the battle to LaBarba throughout the contest, though some ringside felt LaBarba had landed the cleaner blows. Battalino was forced to score frequently during the infighting against the studied defense of LaBarba. LaBarba was forced to hold frequently to rest from the constant assault of his opponent. After his victory, most of the boxing world began to acknowledge that Battalino was a champion who had earned his title, as his opponent LaBarba was highly respected and a 2-1 favorite in the early betting.

Battalino defeated Earl Mastro in a ten round mixed decision NBA featherweight world championship bout on November 4, 1931, before a crowd of 14,000 at Chicago Stadium. Mastro was briefly down in the second and down for a count of nine from a left to the body in the sixth. In the last two rounds, Battalino closed strongly and battered Mastro nearly at will, extending his points margin.

== Important non-title bouts while holding the world featherweight title ==
Battalino's best known competitors among his non-title victories included Lew Massey, Bud Taylor, Eddie Shea and Al Singer.

Battalino defeated Lew Massey on May 5, 1930, in a ten round mixed decision in Philadelphia before a crowd of 7,000. Massey was close to being knocked out in the seventh but was saved by the bell. The non-title bout was described as slow and deliberate and featured frequent clinching, though much was initiated by Massey who feared Battalino's right. Massey had defeated Battalino the previous January in a ten round unanimous decision.

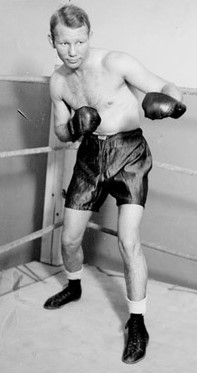
Bud Taylor

Battalino defeated 1927 World Bantamweight Champion Bud Taylor in a ten round points decision before a modest 6,600 fans on August 18, 1930, in East Hartford, Connecticut. In a compelling win, Battalino was awarded eight of the ten rounds by the referee with only the eighth to Taylor. Using his right to protect his head and body, Battalino was very effective with his left, but almost always from inside, and the fight's consistent infighting and frequent clinching, did not please the crowd. It was not until the eighth that a steady flurry of punches from long range took place, and Taylor was able to land a strong left to the chin of Battalino.

In a non-title bout, Lois "Kid" Kaplan, 1925 world featherweight champion, defeated Battalino in a ten round points decision before a crowd of 7,000 on September 24, 1930, at Hurley Stadium in Hartford, Connecticut. The referee and the single judge both gave Kaplan a convincing nine of the ten rounds, in an exciting bout that featured no knockdowns. The referee gave Kaplan all but the fifth, which he scored as even. Battalino was forced to fight on the defensive most of the way, but managed a few staggering rights to the head and heart of Kaplan, though they were never sufficient to slow Kaplan's attack more than momentarily. Governor Trumball of Connecticut attended the bout and spoke briefly.

On September 15, 1931, Battalino defeated Eddie Shea before a crowd of 5000 in Hartford in a ten round points decision. Battalino took a number of hard shots in the second, third, and fourth, but he fought fiercely in the infighting and may have landed some of the hardest and cleanest blows of his later career. From the fourth round on, Battalino's infighting dominated and he was eventually credited with eight of the ten rounds.

While still holding the championship, Battalino decisively defeated 1930 world lightweight champion Al Singer, before a crowd of 17,000 at New York's Madison Square Garden on December 11, 1931. Battalino may have bobbed and weaved away from Singer's early volleys in the first, and was likely shaken by a blow or two, but his counterattack was devastating to his opponent. Though Singer started strong very early in the opening round, he was soon put down three times by Battalino, and went down in the second from a series of rights to the chin for a count of seven. After he rose, he was chased around the ring by Battalino who put him down again with a right to the chin for a count of four, just before the referee justifiably called the bout a technical knockout and helped move Singer to his corner. Singer's labored retreat from Battalino after he was first put down, his inability to defend himself, and his struggle to mount an attack, indicated a boxer who had, at least for the moment, lost most of his physical faculties. Both boxers were above the featherweight limit preventing any chance of the match being a featherweight title match.

== Relinquishing the world featherweight titles, 1932 ==
Battalino was originally scheduled to defend his titles against Lew Feldman on January 9, 1932, but missed weight the day before. With the bout thus canceled, Battalino was summarily stripped of his NYSAC title. This was also the first time that a boxing match scheduled for Madison Square Garden had been canceled the afternoon of the night in which the bout was scheduled.

On January 27, 1932, Battalino once again defended his NBA and The Ring titles against Freddie Miller before a small crowd of 2,000 in Cincinnati, Ohio. The champion came in three pounds overweight and did not put up a good fight. Battalino went down in the third round from what the referee considered a harmless right to the chin. When Battalino arose, Miller put him down again. The referee stopped the fight and declared Miller the winner. The NBA, however, overruled the referee and declared the bout a "no contest." The NBA title then became vacant, as Battalino did not make the featherweight limit. To end any confusion about his championship status, Battalino voluntarily relinquished his remaining The Ring title on March 1 and moved up a weight class to fight at the lightweight limit.

=== Late career as a lightweight ===
As a lightweight, he lost bouts with Hall of Famers Billy Petrolle and Barney Ross.

Battalino lost to Billy Petrolle on March 24, 1932, in Madison Square Garden in a twelve round technical knockout. A crowd of 18,000 saw Petrolle cut Battalino into pieces with vicious lefts and rights to the head, tearing cuts all over his body, and finally stopping him 1:21 into the final round. When a flurry of blows landed Battalino on the ropes, the referee finally called the bout. Later on May 20, before 10,000 at Chicago Stadium, Petrolle won again by a ten round unanimous decision of the judges. Though Battalino dropped Petrolle for a count of nine with a left hook in the first round, Petrolle came roaring back. He took seven rounds with Battalino only three.

Battalino lost to the exceptional future light and welterweight champion Barney Ross on October 21, 1932, in a ten round unanimous decision at Chicago Stadium. In a decisive victory, Ross was awarded nine of the ten rounds, using his left throughout and mounting a winning defense. The Hartford Courant gave Ross only seven of the ten rounds but had a hometown bias for Battalino. In the first two rounds, Battalino was stung repeatedly by Ross's blows. Ross's defense did not preclude Battalino from mounting relentless body attacks after the first two rounds, though Ross weathered them and consistently defended against them without great effect. Ross may have even won the infighting, mounting more effective body blows than Battalino.

On October 23, 1934, Battalino defeated future World Colored Welterweight champion, Puerto Ricon boxer Cocoa Kid, in a seven round technical knockout in Hartford. As was typical of his style, Battalino mounted a successful and relentless body attack against his opponent that had him weak by the fifth round. Battalino scored with four rapid rights to the head in the fifth. In the sixth, Battalino scored with powerful body blows to the midsection.

== After boxing ==
Battalino's last bout was with Dick Turcotte in Hartford on January 30, 1940, which he lost in a ten round points decision. When Battalino retired from boxing after the bout, he settled in Hartford, Connecticut, and worked as a construction laborer.

Battalino died on July 25, 1977, at Hartford Hospital in West Hartford, and was buried at the Mount St. Benedict Cemetery. He left a wife Lilian, two daughters, and six grandchildren.

== Professional boxing record ==
88 fights	57 wins	26 losses
By knockout	23	1
By decision	34	24
By disqualification	0	1
Draws	3	
No contests	2	

No.	Result	Record	Opponent	Type	Round	Date	Location	Notes
88	Loss	57–26–3 (2)	Dick Turcotte	PTS	10	Jan 30, 1940	Foot Guard Hall, Hartford, Connecticut, U.S.	
87	Loss	57–25–3 (2)	George Martin	UD	10	Dec 4, 1939	Valley Arena, Holyoke, Massachusetts, U.S.	
86	Draw	57–24–3 (2)	George Pepe	PTS	8	Nov 16, 1939	Arena, New Haven, Connecticut, U.S.	
85	Win	57–24–2 (2)	Jerry Maloni	SD	10	Oct 30, 1939	Valley Arena, Holyoke, Massachusetts, U.S.	
84	Win	56–24–2 (2)	Frankie Young	PTS	8	Sep 26, 1939	Foot Guard Hall, Hartford, Connecticut, U.S.	
83	Win	55–24–2 (2)	Frankie Young	PTS	6	Sep 12, 1939	Capitol Park Arena, Hartford, Connecticut, U.S.	
82	Win	54–24–2 (2)	Johnny Castonguay	RTD	3 (6)	Sep 5, 1939	Capitol Park Arena, Hartford, Connecticut, U.S.	
81	Win	53–24–2 (2)	Felix Garcia	KO	2 (6)	Aug 8, 1939	Capitol Park Arena, Hartford, Connecticut, U.S.	
80	Win	52–24–2 (2)	Oscar Suggs	PTS	6	Jul 25, 1939	Capitol Park Arena, Hartford, Connecticut, U.S.	
79	Win	51–24–2 (2)	Sal Canata	TKO	1 (6)	Jul 11, 1939	Capitol Park Arena, Hartford, Connecticut, U.S.	
78	Loss	50–24–2 (2)	Howard Scott	PTS	10	Jul 6, 1936	South Park Arena, Hartford, Connecticut, U.S.	
77	Loss	50–23–2 (2)	Howard Scott	PTS	10	Jun 15, 1936	Griffith Stadium, Washington, D.C., U.S.	
76	Loss	50–22–2 (2)	Al Roth	PTS	10	Apr 8, 1936	Star Casino, New York City, New York, U.S.	
75	Win	50–21–2 (2)	Joey Greb	PTS	6	Feb 25, 1936	New York Coliseum, New York City, New York, U.S.	
74	Win	49–21–2 (2)	Midget Mexico	PTS	10	Feb 5, 1936	Star Casino, New York City, New York, U.S.	
73	Win	48–21–2 (2)	Pete Nebo	TKO	2 (10)	Jan 30, 1936	Foot Guard Hall, Hartford, Connecticut, U.S.	
72	Loss	47–21–2 (2)	Jimmy Leto	PTS	10	Nov 26, 1934	Foot Guard Hall, Hartford, Connecticut, U.S.	
71	Win	47–20–2 (2)	Herbert Lewis Hardwick	RTD	6 (10)	Oct 23, 1934	Foot Guard Hall, Hartford, Connecticut, U.S.	
70	Win	46–20–2 (2)	Lew Feldman	PTS	10	Oct 1, 1934	South Park Arena, Hartford, Connecticut, U.S.	
69	Loss	45–20–2 (2)	Lew Feldman	PTS	10	Sep 11, 1934	White City Stadium, West Haven, Connecticut, U.S.	
68	Win	45–19–2 (2)	Jackie Davis	PTS	10	Jul 24, 1934	South Park Arena, Hartford, Connecticut, U.S.	
67	Win	44–19–2 (2)	Antonio Cerdan	PTS	10	Jun 8, 1934	Estadio Riachuelo, Río de Janeiro, Rio de Janeiro, Brazil	
66	Loss	43–19–2 (2)	Phil Rafferty	SD	8	Aug 9, 1933	Polo Grounds, New York City, New York, U.S.	
65	Win	43–18–2 (2)	Benny Whitler	KO	2 (10)	Jul 28, 1933	Woodcliff Park, Poughkeepsie, New York, U.S.	
64	Loss	42–18–2 (2)	Barney Ross	UD	10	Oct 21, 1932	Chicago Stadium, Chicago, Illinois, U.S.	
63	Loss	42–17–2 (2)	Eddie Holmes	PTS	10	Sep 5, 1932	Cycledrome, Providence, Rhode Island, U.S.	
62	Win	42–16–2 (2)	Billy Townsend	PTS	10	Aug 11, 1932	Ebbets Field, New York City, New York, U.S.	
61	Win	41–16–2 (2)	Willie Hines	KO	3 (10)	Jul 28, 1932	Fort Hamilton Arena, New York City, New York, U.S.	
60	Loss	40–16–2 (2)	Frankie Petrolle	MD	10	Jul 19, 1932	Queensboro Stadium, New York City, New York, U.S.	
59	Loss	40–15–2 (2)	Frankie Petrolle	UD	10	Jun 28, 1932	Queensboro Stadium, New York City, New York, U.S.	
58	Loss	40–14–2 (2)	Billy Petrolle	UD	10	May 20, 1932	Chicago Stadium, Chicago, Illinois, U.S.	
57	Loss	40–13–2 (2)	Billy Petrolle	TKO	12 (12)	Mar 24, 1932	Madison Square Garden, New York City, New York, U.S.	
56	Win	40–12–2 (2)	Eddie Ran	UD	10	Mar 11, 1932	Madison Square Garden, New York City, New York, U.S.	
55	Win	39–12–2 (2)	Billy Shaw	KO	2 (10)	Feb 24, 1932	Coliseum, Saint Louis, Missouri, U.S.	
54	NC	38–12–2 (2)	Freddie Miller	NC	3 (10)	Jan 27, 1932	Music Hall Arena, Cincinnati, Ohio, U.S.	NBA and The Ring featherweight titles at stake; Only for Miller (missed weight); Battalino down from a blow deemed to be too light by the ref no contest for "faking"
53	Win	38–12–2 (1)	Al Singer	TKO	2 (10)	Dec 11, 1931	Madison Square Garden, New York City, New York, U.S.	
52	Win	37–12–2 (1)	Bushy Graham	KO	1 (10)	Nov 19, 1931	Chicago Stadium, Chicago, Illinois, U.S.	
51	Win	36–12–2 (1)	Earl Mastro	MD	10	Nov 4, 1931	Chicago Stadium, Chicago, Illinois, U.S.	Retained NYSAC, NBA, and The Ring featherweight titles
50	Loss	35–12–2 (1)	Roger Bernard	MD	10	Oct 12, 1931	Arena, Philadelphia, Pennsylvania, U.S.	
49	Loss	35–11–2 (1)	Bushy Graham	SD	10	Sep 24, 1931	Redland Field, Cincinnati, Ohio, U.S.	
48	Win	35–10–2 (1)	Eddie Shea	PTS	10	Sep 15, 1931	Hurley Stadium, East Hartford, Connecticut, U.S.	
47	Win	34–10–2 (1)	Freddie Miller	UD	10	Jul 23, 1931	Redland Field, Cincinnati, Ohio, U.S.	Retained NYSAC, NBA, and The Ring featherweight titles
46	Win	33–10–2 (1)	Bobby Brady	PTS	10	Jul 1, 1931	Baseball Park, Jersey City, New Jersey, U.S.	
45	Win	32–10–2 (1)	Johnny Datto	KO	5 (10)	Jun 15, 1931	Hurley Stadium, East Hartford, Connecticut, U.S.	
44	Win	31–10–2 (1)	Fidel LaBarba	UD	15	May 22, 1931	Madison Square Garden, New York City, New York, U.S.	Retained NYSAC, NBA, and The Ring featherweight titles
43	Win	30–10–2 (1)	Andy Martin	PTS	10	Apr 20, 1931	State Armory, Hartford, Connecticut, U.S.	
42	Loss	29–10–2 (1)	Andy Callahan	UD	10	Mar 20, 1931	Boston Garden, Boston, Massachusetts, U.S.	For USA New England lightweight title
41	Win	29–9–2 (1)	Young Zazzarino	PTS	10	Mar 6, 1931	State Armory, Hartford, Connecticut, U.S.	
40	Loss	28–9–2 (1)	Eddie Shea	UD	10	Jan 23, 1931	Chicago Stadium, Chicago, Illinois, U.S.	
39	Win	28–8–2 (1)	Kid Chocolate	UD	15	Dec 12, 1930	Madison Square Garden, New York City, New York, U.S.	Retained NYSAC, NBA, and The Ring featherweight titles
38	Loss	27–8–2 (1)	Young Zazzarino	DQ	3 (10)	Oct 20, 1930	Oakland Arena, Jersey City, New Jersey, U.S.	
37	Loss	27–7–2 (1)	Louis "Kid" Kaplan	PTS	10	Sep 24, 1930	Hurley Stadium, East Hartford, Connecticut, U.S.	
36	Loss	27–6–2 (1)	Roger Bernard	PTS	10	Sep 5, 1930	Olympia Stadium, Detroit, Michigan, U.S.	
35	Win	27–5–2 (1)	Bud Taylor	PTS	10	Aug 18, 1930	Hurley Stadium, East Hartford, Connecticut, U.S.	
34	Loss	26–5–2 (1)	Cecil Payne	UD	10	Jul 24, 1930	Redland Field, Cincinnati, Ohio, U.S.	
33	Win	26–4–2 (1)	Ignacio Fernandez	KO	5 (15)	Jul 15, 1930	Hurley Stadium, East Hartford, Connecticut, U.S.	Retained NYSAC, NBA, and The Ring featherweight titles
32	Loss	25–4–2 (1)	Cecil Payne	UD	10	Jun 10, 1930	Redland Field, Cincinnati, Ohio, U.S.	
31	Win	25–3–2 (1)	Vic Burrone	UD	10	May 21, 1930	Meyers Bowl, North Braddock, Pennsylvania, U.S.	
30	Win	24–3–2 (1)	Lew Massey	MD	10	May 5, 1930	Arena, Philadelphia, Connecticut, U.S.	
29	Win	23–3–2 (1)	Bushy Graham	PTS	10	Apr 25, 1930	Foot Guard Hall, Hartford, Connecticut, U.S.	
28	Win	22–3–2 (1)	Benny Nabors	KO	4 (10)	Apr 14, 1930	Buckingham Hall, Waterbury, Connecticut, U.S.	
27	Loss	21–3–2 (1)	Bud Taylor	PTS	10	Mar 20, 1930	Olympia Stadium, Detroit, Michigan, U.S.	
26	Win	21–2–2 (1)	Ignacio Fernandez	PTS	10	Feb 25, 1930	State Armory, Hartford, Connecticut, U.S.	
25	Loss	20–2–2 (1)	Lew Massey	UD	10	Jan 20, 1930	Arena, Philadelphia, Pennsylvania, U.S.	
24	Win	20–1–2 (1)	Phil Verdi	TKO	3 (10)	Jan 9, 1930	Arena, New Haven, Connecticut, U.S.	
23	Win	19–1–2 (1)	André Routis	PTS	15	Sep 23, 1929	Hurley Stadium, East Hartford, Connecticut, U.S.	Won NYSAC, NBA, and The Ring featherweight titles
22	Win	18–1–2 (1)	Panama Al Brown	PTS	10	Jul 26, 1929	Bulkeley Stadium, Hartford, Connecticut, U.S.	
21	Win	17–1–2 (1)	Eddie Lord	PTS	10	Jun 5, 1929	Bulkeley Stadium, Hartford, Connecticut, U.S.	
20	Win	16–1–2 (1)	Tony Leto	TKO	7 (10)	Feb 21, 1929	Foot Guard Hall, Hartford, Connecticut, U.S.	
19	Win	15–1–2 (1)	Joe Curry	TKO	2 (10)	Feb 7, 1929	Foot Guard Hall, Hartford, Connecticut, U.S.	
18	Win	14–1–2 (1)	Ralph Nischo	KO	1 (10)	Jan 4, 1929	Foot Guard Hall, Hartford, Connecticut, U.S.	
17	Win	13–1–2 (1)	Jimmy Garcia	RTD	1 (6)	Dec 6, 1928	Foot Guard Hall, Hartford, Connecticut, U.S.	
16	Win	12–1–2 (1)	Milton Cohen	PTS	10	Nov 15, 1928	Foot Guard Hall, Hartford, Connecticut, U.S.	
15	Win	11–1–2 (1)	Jules Sombathy	PTS	10	Oct 26, 1928	Foot Guard Hall, Hartford, Connecticut, U.S.	
14	Win	10–1–2 (1)	Milton Cohen	PTS	8	Sep 17, 1928	Velodrome, Hartford, Connecticut, U.S.	
13	Win	9–1–2 (1)	Jimmy Scully	KO	5 (6)	Jul 16, 1928	Velodrome, Hartford, Connecticut, U.S.	
12	Loss	8–1–2 (1)	Johnny Ciccone	PTS	6	Apr 3, 1928	Arena, New Haven, Connecticut, U.S.	
11	Win	8–0–2 (1)	Johnny Ciccone	PTS	6	Feb 20, 1928	Arena, New Haven, Connecticut, U.S.	
10	Draw	7–0–2 (1)	Philly Griffin	PTS	6	Dec 2, 1927	Stanley Arena, New Britain, Connecticut, U.S.	
9	Win	7–0–1 (1)	Jimmy Bones	PTS	6	Nov 12, 1927	State Armory, Bridgeport, Connecticut, U.S.	
8	Draw	6–0–1 (1)	Joe Curry	PTS	6	Sep 22, 1927	Arena, New Haven, Connecticut, U.S.	
7	Win	6–0 (1)	Joe Curry	PTS	6	Sep 15, 1927	Arena, New Haven, Connecticut, U.S.	
6	Win	5–0 (1)	Frisco Bautista	TKO	4 (6)	Aug 25, 1927	White City Stadium, West Haven, Connecticut, U.S.	
5	Win	4–0 (1)	Tony DePalma	PTS	6	Aug 4, 1927	White City Stadium, West Haven, Connecticut, U.S.	
4	Win	3–0 (1)	Kid Wagner	TKO	1 (4)	Jul 28, 1927	Arena, New Haven, Connecticut, U.S.	
3	ND	2–0 (1)	Jimmy Horsburgh	ND	3	Jul 8, 1927	Nutmeg Stadium, New Haven, Connecticut, U.S.	Fight was an exhibition
2	Win	2–0	Jimmy Rossi	KO	1 (6)	Jun 30, 1927	Arena, New Haven, Connecticut, U.S.	
1	Win	1–0	Archie Rosenberg	KO	2 (6)	Jun 6, 1927	Velodrome, Hartford, Connecticut, U.S.	

== Titles in boxing ==
=== Major world titles ===
- NYSAC featherweight champion (126 lbs)
- NBA (WBA) featherweight champion (126 lbs)

=== The Ring magazine titles ===
- The Ring featherweight champion (126 lbs)

=== Undisputed titles ===
- Undisputed featherweight champion

== See also ==
- Lineal championship

== Bibliography ==
- Heller, Peter (1994). In This Corner...!. New York, New York: Da Capo Press. ISBN 0-306-80603-7.
- Mullan, Harry (1987). The Great Book of Boxing. New York, New York: Crescent Books. ISBN 0-7517-6295-4.

Achievements
Preceded by Andre Routis	World Featherweight Champion; September 23, 1929 – March 1, 1932; Vacated	Vacant Title next held by Henry Armstrong
