= Johnny Brown (English boxer) =

English boxer (1902–1976)

Personal information
- Nationality: English
- Born: Philip Hickman; 18 July 1902 Spitalfields, London, England
- Died: 1 July 1976 (aged 73)
- Weight: English bantamweight champion

Boxing career

Boxing record
- Total fights: 81
- Wins: 53 (KO 29)
- Losses: 25 (KO 9)
- Draws: 3

Philip Hickman (18 July 1902 – 1 July 1976), who fought under the name Johnny Brown, was an English Jewish bantamweight boxer of the 1920s, though he fought some as a feather and lightweight. Born in Spitalfields, London he won the National Sporting Club (NSC) (subsequently known as the British Boxing Board of Control (BBBofC)) British bantamweight title, British Empire bantamweight title, and European Boxing Union (EBU) bantamweight title. His professional fighting weight varied from 116 lb (53 kg; 8 st 4 lb), i.e. flyweight to 128 lb (58 kg; 9 st 2 lb), i.e. featherweight., though the majority of his important fights were fought as a bantam.

== Early life and career ==
Brown was born on 18 July 1902, in St. Georges, East London, England. He was the older brother of the boxer, Young Johnny Brown , an English featherweight contender who fought in both American and England. In 1921, Brown traveled to the United States, and fought eighteen bouts that by 1922, were against the world's top bantamweights. During the mid-1920s, Brown was consistently rated among the top ten bantamweights in the world.

In an important early contest, Brown lost to Kid Davis on 26 May 1921 in the last round of a bantamweight belt competition at the Ring on Blackfriars Road in Southwork, England. Brown had had victories in contests leading to this final bout, in the previous month, and his performance in the competition marked him as a top young English bantamweight competitor, of enough skill to draw crowds in America.

=== Early career boxing in New England and Canada, 1921-3 ===
Brown lost to New York's Frankie Jerome in a ten-round points decision at Dykman Oval in Manhattan, on 27 September 1921. Jerome would fight many of the best boxers of his era, and the boxing reporters took note that Brown was a quality competitor yet to make his mark.

In a substitution on 20 November 1921, Johnny Brown lost to Joe Burman in an eight-round newspaper decision at the Olympia Club in Philadelphia. Burman was the aggressor in nearly every round, and Brown held in the clinches, except for the eighth when he tried to open up, but it would be too late to gain the decision of the local newspapers. The boxing was slow through most of the rounds, and Brown lost the newspaper decision largely because he fought on the defensive throughout the bout.

Brown lost to New York East Side boxer Charlie Beecher on 31 January 1922 in a twelve-round points decision that served as the feature attraction of New York's Pioneer Athletic Club. The New York Times wrote that Brown fought as a willing and clever boxer with a strong punch, and "forced Beecher to extend himself to win". Brown left the ring unmarked. Beecher won the bout by establishing a points margin over his opponent with the effective use of both hands at long range and a consistent attack to the body at close quarters. In a close bout, a draw may have been the more popular decision. Beecher breezed into the lead in the tenth with blows delivered in clinches that were unpopular with the fans.

Brown defeated Tommy Murray on 16 October 1922 in an eight-round newspaper decision at the Olympia Athletic Club in Philadelphia. Murray would face quality boxers in his career including Pete Zivic, Bud Taylor, and Benny Bass, but he had only been boxing three years when he met Brown.

On 28 March 1923, Brown lost to future British featherweight champion, Leo "Kid" Roy at the St. Denis Theatre, in a ten-round unanimous decision in Montreal, Canada. Roy was given little or no chance of winning from Brown, the future British bantamweight champion. Roy fought more cautiously against Brown, saving himself for the later parts of the match. He took the offensive in most of the bout, gaining points and confidence. Once gaining a knowledge of Brown's style of attack and defence, Roy went on the offensive in later rounds and built up a points margin. From the second round on, most of the boxing was toe to toe, in a fierce and entertaining spectacle. Roy landed more blows in the seventh through tenth, taking the offensive, and winning the points scoring, and though the bout remained somewhat close, the decision was popular with the crowd.

=== Taking the British, European, and Empire bantamweight titles, November, 1923 ===
At the National Sporting Club in London, on 26 November 1923, Brown took the European, British and Commonwealth (Empire) bantamweight titles with a twenty-round decision over "Bugler" Harry Lake. Lake had held the European title since 30 July when he defeated French boxer Charles LeDoux. Though Brown took the first round, Lake forged ahead in points around the tenth. Lake floored Brown near the end of the fourteenth, and later shook him with a left and right. Brown attacked fiercely in the last four rounds, however, and managed to win by a narrow points margin, taking the Lonsdale Belt.

In his first defence, Brown defended his titles against Harry Corbett on 23 February 1925, winning in a sixteenth-round knockout at the National Sporting Club at London's Covent Gardens. Corbett was badly beaten, particularly in the last three rounds, when he was repeatedly knocked down with hard blows to the jaw. In the sixteenth, Corbett's seconds tossed in the towel, when they saw he was hopelessly beaten.

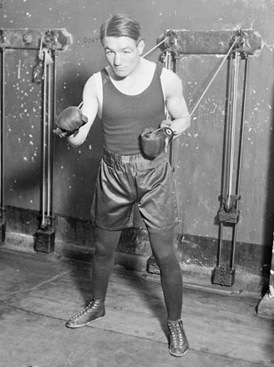
André Routis, world featherweight champion

Brown defeated Frenchman André Routis, 1928 World Featherweight Champion, on 30 April 1925, in a fifth round disqualification at Royal Albert Hall in Kensington. Routis had taken the French Bantamweight title in 1924, and still held it at the time of the bout. Routis would take the Featherweight Championship of the World in 1928.

Brown defeated 1927 British featherweight champion, Johnny Cuthbert on 6 September 1925 in an eighth round disqualification at Premierland, White Chapel.

On 19 October 1925, Brown defended all three titles against Mick Hill at the National Sporting Club in Covent Garden, winning in an important twelfth-round knockout. Brown started off at a tremendous pace, scoring with both hands, but in the fourth round, Hill landed a smashing blow to the stomach, and upper cuts to the chin and in the fifth, a right uppercut to the face. The fifth through ninth were fairly even, but Hill briefly dropped Brown to the canvas with a left uppercut in the eleventh. In the twelfth, turning the tide, Brown dropped hill for a count of eight. When Brown arose, he was an easy mark for Brown who put him down for the count with a right smash to the jaw. Brown was initially a half pound overweight, and had to briefly exercise to lose the weight.

=== Tough bouts with top opponents in America and Canada, 1926 ===
Brown lost to Carl Tremaine, a former holder of the Canadian world featherweight title, on 5 February 1926 in a ten-round points decision at the Coliseum in Toronto, Canada. The match was one sided throughout, with Brown taking a count of nine, seven times during the fighting. Brown escaped being knocked out due to his excellent conditioning.

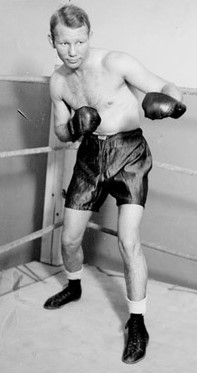
Bud Taylor

Brown lost to future NBA world bantamweight champion Bud Taylor, on 9 March 1926, at the Arena in Vernon, California, in a ten-round points decision. In a one-sided bout, Taylor pounded Brown at will, and several times had him on the verge of a knockout. One source noted that Taylor may have broken his left hand in the third round.

On 14 May 1926, Brown lost to superb black American boxer Chick Suggs, in a fifth-round technical knockout at New York's Madison Square Garden. The bout was one sided throughout, with Suggs doing as he pleased, and though Brown withstood the punishment, the referee humanely stopped the bout 2:23 into the fifth round. Suggs scored no knockdowns but outboxed Brown throughout the match, cutting him around the mouth and nose.

Brown lost decisively on 11 June 1926 to Jackie Johnston, Canadian bantamweight champion, in a ten-round points decision at Maple Leaf Stadium in Toronto, Canada. Johnston dropped Brown briefly in the fourth for a no count.

Brown lost to 1932 World Junior Welterweight contender, Sammy Fuller in a first-round technical knockout before an estimated crowd of 15,000 at Braves Field in Boston on 16 November 1926. The first telling blow was a left hook to the jaw that put Brown down for a count of nine, and upon arising, another blow by Fuller put him down for a count of eight. Brown was put down again with a right to the temple and was reeling around the ring before the referee made the right decision and called the bout 1:30 into the first round.

In his last bout in the United States on 11 October 1926, Brown lost to Tommy Ryan, 1924 contender for the World Bantamweight Title against Abe Goldstein, in an eighth-round technical knockout at Broadway Auditorium in Buffalo, New York.

=== Late career bouts in England with top British bantam and featherweight contenders Nel Tarleton and Len Fowler ===
In an important victory, Brown defeated, 1940 BBofC British and Empire Featherweight Champion, on 8 September 1927 in a fifteen-round points decision at Premierland, White Chapel, England.

On 21 September 1927, Brown decisively defeated Len Fowler, 1925 top-rated British bantamweight contender, in a fourth-round knockout at Premierland, White Chapel, near London.

=== Losing the British, European, and Empire bantamweight titles, August, 1928 ===
In the last bout of his career on 29 August 1928, Brown lost all three of his British titles to former British bantamweight champion Teddy Baldock in a second-round technical knockout at London's Clapton Orient football ground. Before 50,000 spectators, Baldock attacked immediately at the first bell, with straight lefts to the head and then a hard right, sending Brown to the canvas twice in the first. Brown was so badly punished in the second that his handlers threw in the towel. Brown retired from boxing after the bout.

He died on 1 July 1976, aged 73.
