= Harry Lake (boxer) =

English boxer

Personal information
- Nickname: Bugler
- Nationality: English
- Born: Henry Lake; 17 October 1902 Devonport England
- Died: 1970 (aged 67)
- Weight: bantam/feather/lightweight

Boxing career

Boxing record
- Total fights: 197
- Wins: 123 (KO 22)
- Losses: 56 (KO 16)
- Draws: 18

Bugler Harry Lake (17 October 1902 – 1970) born in Devonport was an English professional bantam/feather/lightweight boxer of the 1910s, 1920s and 1930s who won the National Sporting Club (NSC) (subsequently known as the British Boxing Board of Control (BBBofC)) British bantamweight title, British Empire bantamweight title, and European Boxing Union (EBU) bantamweight title, his professional fighting weight varied from 112 1/2 lb (51.0 kg; 8 st 0.5 lb), i.e. bantamweight to 130 lb (59 kg; 9 st 4 lb), i.e. lightweight.
