= Walter Ross (boxer) =

Scottish boxer

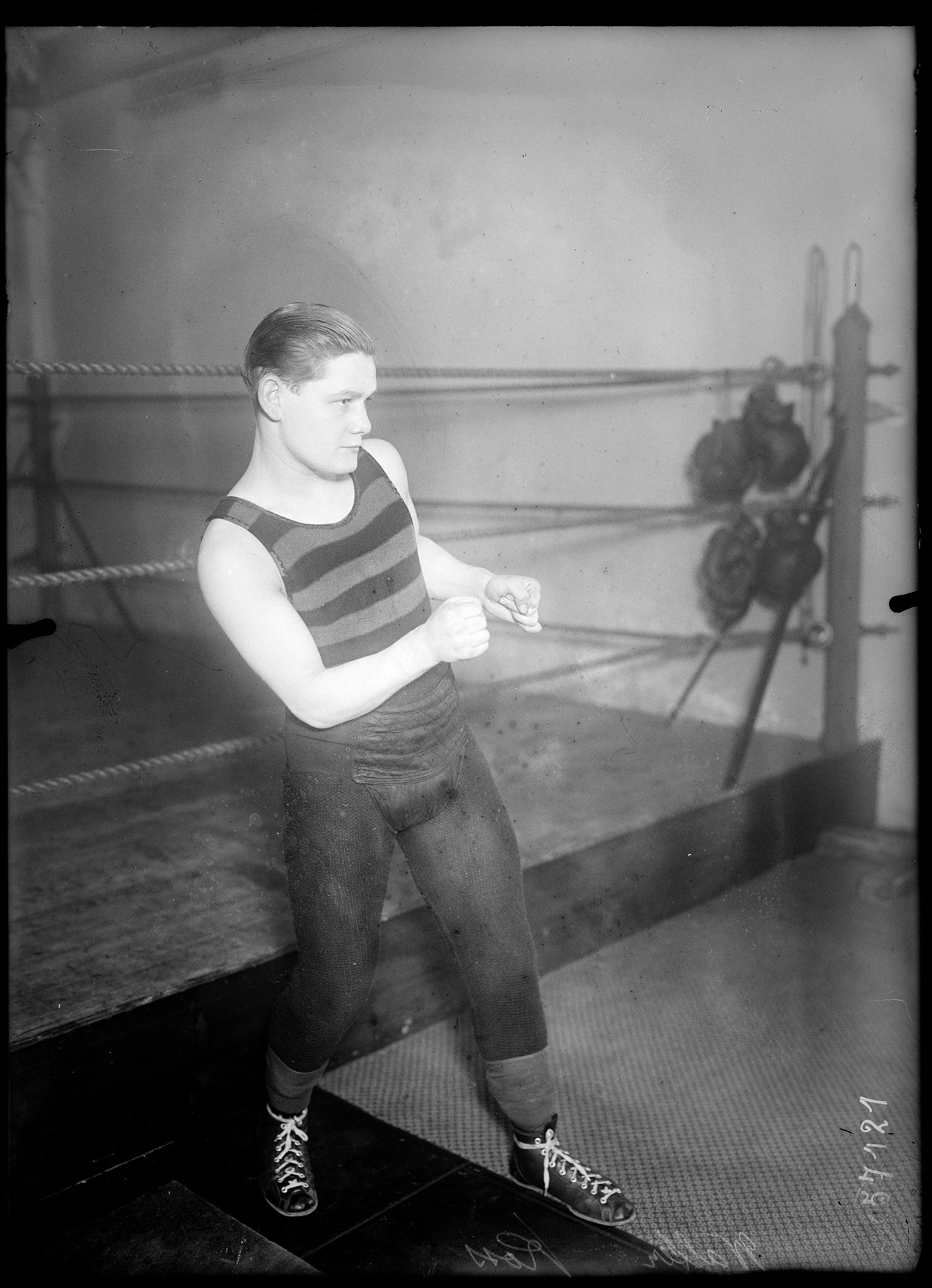
- Walter Ross (Paris, 1919)

Personal information
- Nationality: British
- Born: 3 July 1898 Glasgow, Scotland
- Height: 5 ft 7 in (170 cm)
- Weight: Flyweight, bantamweight, featherweight

Boxing career

Boxing record
- Total fights: 67
- Wins: 40
- Win by KO: 15
- Losses: 22
- Draws: 3

Walter Ross (born 3 July 1898) was a Scottish boxer who was British bantamweight champion in 1919 and fought for the European title the same year.

== Career ==
Born in Glasgow, but based during much of his professional career in Hoxton, London, Ross made his professional debut in March 1915 with a points win over Joe Clark at flyweight. He won six of his first ten fights and in August 1916 faced Sid Shields for the vacant Scottish flyweight title, winning on points over 20 rounds.

In March 1917 he fought a draw with Louis Ruddick at the Holborn Stadium. In November he beat Johnny Hughes over 20 rounds, and followed that in January 1918 with a win over Digger Stanley. He beat Stanley again in April, his opponent being disqualified in the sixth round, but lost to Tommy Noble on points in October.

In June 1919 he challenged for Noble's British bantamweight title at the National Sporting Club. Ross dominated the fight, and Noble's corner threw in the towel midway through the tenth round, giving Ross the British title.

Ross faced Eugène Criqui in September 1919, the Frenchman knocking him out in the fifteenth round. Three months later he challenged for Charles Ledoux's European bantamweight title at the Cirque de Paris, but lost after retiring in the twelfth and final round while well behind. Only two weeks after the fight with Ledoux, he faced Joe Symonds in Plymouth.

He fought a draw with Robert Dastillon in January 1920. After losing his next two fights he put together a run of wins which included defeats of Alf Goodwin, Sid Whatley, Marcel Lepreux, and former British champion Bill Beynon. The run came to an end when he was disqualified for hitting low against Dastillon in Paris in October.

In 1921 he beat Beynon and Dastillon, but lost to Symonds in October.

In 1922 he travelled to Australia for a series of fights, but won only one (against Silvino Jamito). After three and a half years out of the ring he returned in December 1925, losing three fights before finally retiring in 1926.
