= Jim Higgins (boxer) =

Scottish boxer

Personal information
- Nationality: Scottish
- Born: 25 October 1897 Hamilton, Scotland
- Died: 26 November 1964 (aged 67)
- Weight: bantam/featherweight

Boxing career

Boxing record
- Total fights: 36
- Wins: 19 (KO 10)
- Losses: 14 (KO 8)
- Draws: 3

Jim Higgins (25 October 1897 – 26 November 1964) born in Hamilton was a Scottish professional bantam/featherweight boxer of the 1910s, 1920s and 1930s who won the National Sporting Club (NSC) (subsequently known as the British Boxing Board of Control (BBBofC)) British bantamweight title, and inaugural British Empire bantamweight title, and was a challenger for the Scottish Area bantamweight title against Elky Clark (twice), and European Boxing Union (EBU) bantamweight title against Charles Ledoux, his professional fighting weight varied from 117 lb (53 kg; 8 st 5 lb), i.e. bantamweight to 122 lb (55 kg; 8 st 10 lb), i.e. featherweight.
