= Charles Ledoux =

French boxer (1892–1967)

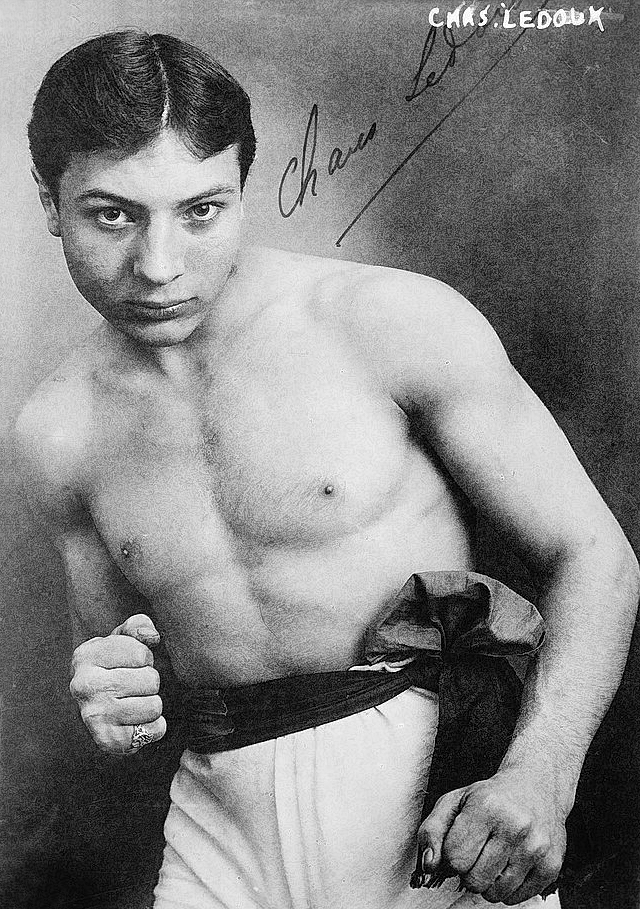

Personal information
- Nickname: Little Apache
- Born: Charles Ledoux; 27 October 1892 Nevers, Nièvre, France
- Died: 21 May 1967 (aged 74)
- Height: 154 cm (5 ft 1 in)
- Weight: Bantamweight

Boxing career
- Reach: 160 cm (63 in)
- Stance: Orthodox

Boxing record
- Total fights: 144
- Wins: 106
- Win by KO: 87
- Losses: 31
- Draws: 7

Charles Ledoux (27 October 1892 – 21 May 1967) was a French bantamweight boxer who was active from 1909 to 1926. While never capturing a world title, he squared off against the best opposition available to him both nationally and internationally. During his career, Ledoux faced the likes of Jim Driscoll, Georges Carpentier, Johnny Coulon, Kid Herman, Kid Williams, Eugène Criqui and Joe Lynch. Ledoux was inducted into the International Boxing Hall of Fame in 2014. He was one on the hardest hitting bantamweights in boxing history, with 43 of his 86 knockouts coming in the first 3 rounds and 16 of them in the first round.

== Professional boxing record ==
All information in this section is derived from BoxRec, unless otherwise stated.

=== Official record ===
144 fights	104 wins	23 losses
By knockout	87	3
By decision	14	20
By disqualification	3	0
Draws	6	
Newspaper decisions/draws	11	

All newspaper decisions are officially regarded as "no decision" bouts and are not counted in the win/loss/draw column.

No.	Result	Record	Opponent	Type	Round, time	Date	Location	Notes
144	Win	104–23–6 (11)	Georges Durocher	KO	2 (10)	9 Apr 1926	Strasbourg, France	
143	Loss	103–23–6 (11)	Young Ciclone	PTS	10	5 Feb 1926	Teatro Circo Olympia, Barcelona, Spain	
142	Loss	103–22–6 (11)	Kid Francis	PTS	12	9 Jun 1925	Cirque de Paris, Paris, France	
141	Win	103–21–6 (11)	Cherubin Durocher	KO	2 (10)	8 Apr 1925	Strasbourg, France	
140	Win	102–21–6 (11)	Paul Marignan	KO	3 (10)	2 Apr 1925	Tours, France	
139	Win	101–21–6 (11)	Credeville	KO	3 (12)	11 Mar 1925	Dijon, France	
138	Loss	100–21–6 (11)	Edouard Mascart	PTS	20	18 Nov 1924	Cirque de Paris, Paris, France	
137	Win	100–20–6 (11)	Julien Couleaud	KO	3 (12)	12 Oct 1924	Montceau-les-Mines, France	
136	Loss	99–20–6 (11)	Abe Goldstein	UD	15	16 Jul 1924	Metropolitan Velodrome, New York City, New York, US	For NYSAC, NBA, and The Ring bantamweight titles
135	Loss	99–19–6 (11)	Charley Holman	PTS	10	26 Jun 1924	Sportland Heights Arena, Berwyn, Maryland, US	
134	Loss	99–18–6 (11)	Johnny Curtin	NWS	10	20 Jun 1924	Playgrounds Stadium, West New York, New Jersey, US	
133	Loss	99–18–6 (10)	Ernie Goozeman	NWS	10	6 Jun 1924	Sager's Arena, Aurora, Illinois, US	
132	Win	99–18–6 (9)	Edouard Mascart	PTS	20	19 Feb 1924	Cirque de Paris, Paris, France	Retained European featherweight title; Won French featherweight title
131	Loss	98–18–6 (9)	André Routis	PTS	20	22 Jan 1924	Cirque de Paris, Paris, France	Lost French bantamweight title
130	Loss	98–17–6 (9)	Harry Lake	PTS	20	30 Jul 1923	Royal Albert Hall, Kensington, London, England, UK	Lost European bantamweight title
129	Win	98–16–6 (9)	André Routis	PTS	15	6 May 1923	Stade Buffalo, Montrouge, France	Retained European and French bantamweight titles
128	Win	97–16–6 (9)	Pierre Calloir	PTS	10	6 Mar 1923	Luna Park, Lyon, France	
127	Win	96–16–6 (9)	Michel Montreuil	TKO	11 (20)	27 Feb 1923	Cirque de Paris, Paris, France	Retained European bantamweight title
126	Win	95–16–6 (9)	George French	KO	3 (15)	17 Nov 1922	Ring de Paris, Paris, France	
125	Win	94–16–6 (9)	Tommy Harrison	TKO	18 (20)	9 Oct 1922	Palais de Danse, Hanley, Staffordshire, England, UK	Retained European bantamweight title
124	Win	93–16–6 (9)	Benny Thomas	DQ	8 (15)	24 Sep 1922	Stade Buffalo, Montrouge, France	
123	Win	92–16–6 (9)	Christian Gempeler	TKO	5 (12)	15 Aug 1922	Royan, France	
122	Win	91–16–6 (9)	André Routis	PTS	15	18 Jun 1922	Casablanca, French Morocco	Retained European and French bantamweight titles
121	Win	90–16–6 (9)	Tommy Harrison	PTS	20	24 Apr 1922	Liverpool Stadium, Liverpool, Merseyside, England, UK	Won European bantamweight title
120	Loss	89–16–6 (9)	Eugène Criqui	KO	1 (15), 1:23	5 Feb 1922	Velodrome d'Hiver, Paris, France	
119	Loss	89–15–6 (9)	Tommy Harrison	PTS	20	24 Oct 1921	Palais de Danse, Hanley, Staffordshire, England, UK	Lost European bantamweight title
118	Loss	89–14–6 (9)	Pete Herman	NWS	10	5 Sep 1921	Louisiana Auditorium, New Orleans, Louisiana, US	
117	Loss	89–14–6 (8)	Danny Kramer	NWS	8	24 Aug 1921	Shibe Park, Philadelphia, Pennsylvania, US	
116	Loss	89–14–6 (7)	Johnny Buff	PTS	10	10 Aug 1921	Boxing Drome, New York City, New York, US	
115	Loss	89–13–6 (7)	Joe Burman	PTS	12	12 Jul 1921	Boxing Drome, New York City, New York, US	
114	Win	89–12–6 (7)	Percy Barnes	KO	5 (10)	11 Jun 1921	Alhambra, Bordeaux, France	
113	Win	88–12–6 (7)	Christian Gempeler	KO	3 (15)	18 May 1921	Iris Park, Barcelona, Spain	
112	Win	87–12–6 (7)	Robert Dastillon	KO	1 (10)	30 Apr 1921	Velodrome d'Hiver, Paris, France	
111	Win	86–12–6 (7)	Bill Beynon	KO	4 (10)	23 Mar 1921	Salle Wagram, Paris, France	
110	Loss	85–12–6 (7)	Kid Williams	PTS	12	16 Dec 1920	5th Regiment Armory, Baltimore, Maryland, US	
109	Draw	85–11–6 (7)	Joe Burman	PTS	10	26 Nov 1920	Infantry Hall, Providence, Rhode Island, US	
108	Draw	85–11–5 (7)	Mickey Delmont	NWS	10	19 Nov 1920	Mount Royal Arena, Montreal, Canada	
107	Loss	85–11–5 (6)	Jackie Sharkey	PTS	15	15 Oct 1920	Madison Square Garden, New York City, New York, US	
106	Loss	85–10–5 (6)	Joe Burman	NWS	8	20 Sep 1920	Olympia A.C., Philadelphia, Pennsylvania, US	
105	Win	85–10–5 (5)	Johnny Fisse	KO	5 (10)	4 Aug 1920	Mount Royal Arena, Montreal, Canada	
104	Loss	84–10–5 (5)	Joe Lynch	NWS	12	2 Aug 1920	Armory A.A., Jersey City, New Jersey, US	
103	Win	84–10–5 (4)	Kid Lewis	KO	7 (10)	7 Jul 1920	Mount Royal Arena, Montreal, Canada	
102	Win	83–10–5 (4)	Kid Lewis	KO	5 (12)	5 Jul 1920	Montreal, Quebec, Canada	
101	Loss	82–10–5 (4)	Joe Burman	NWS	8	23 Jun 1920	Ice Palace, Philadelphia, Pennsylvania, US	
100	Win	82–10–5 (3)	Jim Higgins	KO	11 (20)	31 May 1920	National Sporting Club, Covent Garden, London, England, UK	Retained European bantamweight title
99	Win	81–10–5 (3)	Ted Jack Williams	KO	2 (15)	23 Apr 1920	Salle de l'Orangerie, Nevers, France	
98	Win	80–10–5 (3)	Percy Barnes	KO	4 (15)	7 Apr 1920	Music-Hall Oger, Lyon, France	
97	Win	79–10–5 (3)	Johnny Coulon	KO	6 (15)	16 Mar 1920	Cirque de Paris, Paris, France	
96	Win	78–10–5 (3)	George Langham	KO	5 (20)	18 Feb 1920	Alhambra, Bordeaux, France	
95	Win	77–10–5 (3)	Christian Gempeler	TKO	6 (10)	2 Feb 1920	Alhambra, Bordeaux, France	
94	Win	76–10–5 (3)	Walter 'Young' Ross	RTD	12 (12)	13 Dec 1919	Cirque de Paris, Paris, France	Won vacant European bantamweight title
93	Win	75–10–5 (3)	Gaston Cassini	KO	5 (10)	9 Nov 1919	Casino de la Plage, Marseille, France	
92	Win	74–10–5 (3)	Jim Driscoll	RTD	6 (20)	20 Oct 1919	National Sporting Club, Covent Garden, London, England, UK	Won vacant European featherweight title
91	Win	73–10–5 (3)	Joe Bainbridge	KO	3 (12)	1 Oct 1919	Salle Wagram, Paris, France	
90	Win	72–10–5 (3)	Credeville	KO	4 (15)	11 Sep 1919	Salle de l'Orangerie, Nevers, France	
89	Win	71–10–5 (3)	Albert Cuendet	KO	3 (10)	7 Aug 1919	Casino de Deauville, Deauville, France	
88	Win	70–10–5 (3)	Tommy Noble	KO	10 (20)	31 Jul 1919	Cirque de Paris, Paris, France	
87	Win	69–10–5 (3)	Cherubin Durocher	KO	1 (20)	17 Jul 1919	Salle Wagram, Paris, France	Retained French bantamweight title
86	Draw	68–10–5 (3)	Spike Webb	PTS	6	4 Oct 1918	Verdun, France	
85	Win	68–10–4 (3)	Eugène Criqui	TKO	12 (20)	10 Jul 1914	Élysée Montmartre, Paris, France	
84	Win	67–10–4 (3)	Curley Walker	TKO	5 (10)	29 Jun 1914	National Sporting Club, Covent Garden, London, England, UK	
83	Win	66–10–4 (3)	Lucien Armanet	KO	5 (10)	14 Jun 1914	Place du Champ-de-Mars, Beziers, France	
82	Win	65–10–4 (3)	Lucien Armanet	PTS	6	7 Jun 1914	Corbeil-Essonnes, France	
81	Win	64–10–4 (3)	Cherubin Durocher	RTD	3 (15)	5 Jun 1914	Élysée Montmartre, Paris, France	
80	Win	63–10–4 (3)	Johnny Hughes	KO	7 (20)	2 May 1914	Cardiff Rink, Cardiff, Wales, UK	Retained European bantamweight title
79	Win	62–10–4 (3)	Bill Beynon	RTD	9 (20)	7 Feb 1914	American Skating Rink, Cardiff, Wales, UK	
78	Win	61–10–4 (3)	Bill Beynon	RTD	7 (20)	27 Dec 1913	American Skating Rink, Cardiff, Wales, UK	Retained European bantamweight title
77	Win	60–10–4 (3)	Marcel Lepreux	KO	11 (12)	12 Dec 1913	Élysée Montmartre, Paris, France	Retained French bantamweight title
76	Win	59–10–4 (3)	Sid Smith	RTD	6 (20)	24 Oct 1913	Élysée Montmartre, Paris, France	
75	Loss	58–10–4 (3)	Kid Williams	TKO	16 (20)	15 Jul 1913	Arena, Vernon, California, US	For vacant world bantamweight title claim
74	Loss	58–9–4 (3)	Eddie Campi	PTS	20	24 Jun 1913	Arena, Vernon, California, US	For inaugural IBU bantamweight title
73	Draw	58–8–4 (3)	Phil McGovern	PTS	12	10 Jun 1913	Arena (Atlas A.A.), Boston, Massachusetts, US	
72	Win	58–8–3 (3)	Robert Dastillon	KO	6 (20)	21 May 1913	Cirque de Paris, Paris, France	Retained European and French bantamweight titles
71	Win	57–8–3 (3)	Arthur Wyns	KO	6 (15)	2 May 1913	Élysée Montmartre, Paris, France	Retained European bantamweight title
70	Win	56–8–3 (3)	Joe Jackson	KO	5 (15)	10 Apr 1913	Grande Taverne, Nevers, France	
69	Loss	55–8–3 (3)	Kid Williams	NWS	6	11 Dec 1912	National A.C., Philadelphia, Pennsylvania, US	
68	Win	55–8–3 (2)	Frankie Conway	NWS	6	28 Nov 1912	National A.C., Philadelphia, Pennsylvania, US	
67	Win	55–8–3 (1)	Battling Reddy	NWS	10	20 Nov 1912	Fairmont A.C., New York City, New York, US	
66	Win	55–8–3	Georges Gaillard	DQ	7 (15)	16 Oct 1912	Cirque de Paris, Paris, France	Retained world, European, and French bantamweight titles
65	Win	54–8–3	Sam Minto	KO	9 (10)	11 Oct 1912	Élysée Montmartre, Paris, France	
64	Win	53–8–3	Jim Maher	KO	5 (?)	16 Sep 1912	Casino-Kursaal, Lyon, France	
63	Win	52–8–3	George Burns	KO	1 (10)	9 Sep 1912	Villa des Fleurs, Aix-les-Bains, France	
62	Win	51–8–3	George Burns	KO	2 (10)	22 Aug 1912	Kursaal, Boulogne-sur-Mer, France	
61	Win	50–8–3	George Burns	KO	3 (?)	18 Aug 1912	Théâtre Municipal, Cosne-Cours-sur-Loire, France	
60	Win	49–8–3	George Burns	KO	3 (20)	17 Aug 1912	Salle de l'Orangerie, Nevers, France	
59	Win	48–8–3	George Burns	KO	3 (?)	15 Aug 1912	Salle des Fêtes, Corbigny, France	
58	Win	47–8–3	Digger Stanley	KO	7 (10)	23 Jun 1912	Grand Hall des Magasins Généraux, Dieppe, France	Won world and European bantamweight titles
57	Win	46–8–3	Georges Gaillard	TKO	11 (15)	1 Jun 1912	Salle Wagram, Paris, France	Retained French bantamweight title
56	Win	45–8–3	Jack 'Kid' Greenstock	KO	8 (10)	4 May 1912	Wonderland, Paris, France	
55	Loss	44–8–3	Digger Stanley	PTS	20	22 Apr 1912	National Sporting Club, Covent Garden, London, England, UK	For world and European bantamweight titles
54	Loss	44–7–3	Georges Gaillard	PTS	10	20 Mar 1912	Salle Wagram, Paris, France	
53	Win	44–6–3	Eddie Stanton	KO	3 (10)	1 Mar 1912	Élysée Montmartre, Paris, France	
52	Win	43–6–3	Joe Bowker	TKO	10 (15)	29 Jan 1912	National Sporting Club, Covent Garden, London, England, UK	
51	Win	42–6–3	George Burns	KO	2 (8)	23 Dec 1911	Hippodrome Lillois, Lille, France	
50	Win	41–6–3	Louis Carbonell	KO	3 (10)	30 Nov 1911	Palais de la Boxe, Paris, France	
49	Win	40–6–3	Kid Logan	KO	2 (10)	22 Nov 1911	Cirque de Paris, Paris, France	
48	Win	39–6–3	Bill Ladbury	RTD	4 (10)	8 Nov 1911	Salle Wagram, Paris, France	
47	Win	38–6–3	Stoker Bill Hoskyne	KO	3 (10)	28 Oct 1911	Wonderland, Paris, France	
46	Win	37–6–3	Arthur Exall	KO	1 (10)	14 Oct 1911	Wonderland, Paris, France	
45	Win	36–6–3	Bill Kard	KO	2 (10)	22 Jun 1911	Paris, France	
44	Win	35–6–3	Charles Legrand	PTS	15	7 May 1911	National Sporting Club, Paris, France	Won French bantamweight title
43	Win	34–6–3	Lucien Dorgueille	TKO	4 (10)	8 Apr 1911	Cirque de Paris, Paris, France	
42	Win	33–6–3	Christian Gempeler	PTS	10	5 Apr 1911	Saint-Denis, France	
41	Win	32–6–3	Jack Morris	KO	2 (10)	18 Mar 1911	Wonderland, Paris, France	
40	Win	31–6–3	Jim Butler	KO	4 (10)	25 Feb 1911	Cirque de Paris, Paris, France	
39	Win	30–6–3	Buck Shine	PTS	10	4 Feb 1911	Wonderland, Paris, France	
38	Win	29–6–3	Tom Piggy Paul	KO	2 (10)	21 Jan 1911	Wonderland, Paris, France	
37	Loss	28–6–3	Johnny Hughes	PTS	10	7 Jan 1911	Cirque de Paris, Paris, France	
36	Loss	28–5–3	Johnny Hughes	PTS	20	7 Jan 1911	Cirque de Paris, Paris, France	
35	Win	28–4–3	Johnny Hughes	DQ	2 (10)	26 Nov 1910	Wonderland, Paris, France	
34	Win	27–4–3	Alf Shipp	KO	3 (10)	12 Nov 1910	Wonderland, Paris, France	
33	Win	26–4–3	Auge Grassi	PTS	6	5 Nov 1910	Salle de l'Eldorado, Nancy, France	
32	Win	25–4–3	Auge Grassi	KO	5 (?)	3 Nov 1910	Lutece Arena, Paris, France	
31	Win	24–4–3	Harry Ray	KO	5 (8)	14 Sep 1910	Hippodrome, Paris, France	
30	Win	23–4–3	Bill Kard	PTS	6	22 Jul 1910	Athletic Club de Paris, Paris, France	
29	Loss	22–4–3	Paul Til	PTS	10	1 Jul 1910	Pepiniere, Paris, France	
28	Win	22–3–3	Buck Shine	PTS	10	3 Jun 1910	Cirque de Paris, Paris, France	
27	Draw	21–3–3	Lucien Dorgueille	PTS	8	30 Apr 1910	Wonderland, Paris, France	
26	Win	21–3–2	Jack Guyon	KO	3 (10)	23 Apr 1910	Cirque de Paris, Paris, France	
25	Win	20–3–2	Lucien Dorgueille	PTS	8	16 Apr 1910	Cirque de Paris, Paris, France	
24	Loss	19–3–2	Bill Ladbury	RTD	4 (10)	8 Jan 1910	Wonderland, Paris, France	
23	Win	19–2–2	Charles Meyer	KO	2 (6)	3 Jan 1910	Paris, France	
22	Win	18–2–2	Georges Gaillard	PTS	6	22 Dec 1909	Tivoli Boxing-Hall, Paris, France	
21	Win	17–2–2	Charles Olive	KO	4 (6)	18 Dec 1909	Wonderland, Paris, France	
20	Draw	16–2–2	Marcel Mouginot	PTS	6	9 Dec 1909	Athletic Club de 1er Arrondissement, Paris, France	
19	Win	16–2–1	Achalme	KO	1 (10)	7 Dec 1909	Arenes de boxe, Paris, France	
18	Win	15–2–1	Marcel Mouginot	KO	2 (10)	28 Nov 1909	Paris, France	
17	Win	14–2–1	S. Sejourne	KO	1 (10)	27 Nov 1909	Wonderland, Paris, France	
16	Loss	13–2–1	Georges Carpentier	PTS	15	24 Nov 1909	Tivoli Boxing-Hall, Paris, France	
15	Win	13–1–1	Louis Lepine	KO	2 (10)	20 Nov 1909	Wonderland, Paris, France	
14	Win	12–1–1	R. Rigot	KO	7 (8)	10 Nov 1909	Arenes de boxe, Paris, France	
13	Win	11–1–1	G. Guiraud	KO	1 (8)	6 Nov 1909	Wonderland, Paris, France	
12	Draw	10–1–1	Laret	PTS	4	4 Nov 1909	Athletic Club de 1er Arrondissement, Paris, France	
11	Win	10–1	D. Dages	KO	1 (6)	27 Oct 1909	Arenes de boxe, Paris, France	
10	Win	9–1	R. Robert	KO	1 (6)	23 Oct 1909	Wonderland, Paris, France	
9	Win	8–1	Buster Brown	KO	1 (10)	16 Oct 1909	Wonderland, Paris, France	
8	Loss	7–1	Jules Gurit	PTS	6	15 Aug 1909	Boxing Club de Paris, Paris, France	
7	Win	7–0	Meyer	KO	1 (6)	8 Jan 1909	Paris, France	
6	Win	6–0	V. Vimard	KO	1 (10)	6 Jan 1909	Paris, France	
5	Win	5–0	T. Thibault	KO	1 (6)	5 Jan 1909	Paris, France	
4	Win	4–0	F. Frigol	KO	1 (6)	4 Jan 1909	Paris, France	
3	Win	3–0	C. Costet	KO	2 (4)	3 Jan 1909	Paris, France	
2	Win	2–0	Eddie Vauthier	KO	4 (4)	2 Jan 1909	Paris, France	
1	Win	1–0	Charles Meyer	KO	1 (4)	1 Jan 1909	Paris, France	

=== Unofficial record ===
144 fights	106 wins	31 losses
By knockout	87	3
By decision	16	28
By disqualification	3	0
Draws	7	

Record with the inclusion of newspaper decisions in the win/loss/draw column.

No.	Result	Record	Opponent	Type	Round, time	Date	Location	Notes
144	Win	106–31–7	Georges Durocher	KO	2 (10)	9 Apr 1926	Strasbourg, France	
143	Loss	105–31–7	Young Ciclone	PTS	10	5 Feb 1926	Teatro Circo Olympia, Barcelona, Spain	
142	Loss	105–30–7	Kid Francis	PTS	12	9 Jun 1925	Cirque de Paris, Paris, France	
141	Win	105–29–7	Cherubin Durocher	KO	2 (10)	8 Apr 1925	Strasbourg, France	
140	Win	104–29–7	Paul Marignan	KO	3 (10)	2 Apr 1925	Tours, France	
139	Win	103–29–7	Credeville	KO	3 (12)	11 Mar 1925	Dijon, France	
138	Loss	102–29–7	Edouard Mascart	PTS	20	18 Nov 1924	Cirque de Paris, Paris, France	
137	Win	102–28–7	Julien Couleaud	KO	3 (12)	12 Oct 1924	Montceau-les-Mines, France	
136	Loss	101–28–7	Abe Goldstein	UD	15	16 Jul 1924	Metropolitan Velodrome, New York City, New York, US	For NYSAC, NBA, and The Ring bantamweight titles
135	Loss	101–27–7	Charley Holman	PTS	10	26 Jun 1924	Sportland Heights Arena, Berwyn, Maryland, US	
134	Loss	101–26–7	Johnny Curtin	NWS	10	20 Jun 1924	Playgrounds Stadium, West New York, New Jersey, US	
133	Loss	101–25–7	Ernie Goozeman	NWS	10	6 Jun 1924	Sager's Arena, Aurora, Illinois, US	
132	Win	101–24–7	Edouard Mascart	PTS	20	19 Feb 1924	Cirque de Paris, Paris, France	Retained European featherweight title; Won French featherweight title
131	Loss	100–24–7	André Routis	PTS	20	22 Jan 1924	Cirque de Paris, Paris, France	Lost French bantamweight title
130	Loss	100–23–7	Harry Lake	PTS	20	30 Jul 1923	Royal Albert Hall, Kensington, London, England, UK	Lost European bantamweight title
129	Win	100–22–7	André Routis	PTS	15	6 May 1923	Stade Buffalo, Montrouge, France	Retained European and French bantamweight titles
128	Win	99–22–7	Pierre Calloir	PTS	10	6 Mar 1923	Luna Park, Lyon, France	
127	Win	98–22–7	Michel Montreuil	TKO	11 (20)	27 Feb 1923	Cirque de Paris, Paris, France	Retained European bantamweight title
126	Win	97–22–7	George French	KO	3 (15)	17 Nov 1922	Ring de Paris, Paris, France	
125	Win	96–22–7	Tommy Harrison	TKO	18 (20)	9 Oct 1922	Palais de Danse, Hanley, Staffordshire, England, UK	Retained European bantamweight title
124	Win	95–22–7	Benny Thomas	DQ	8 (15)	24 Sep 1922	Stade Buffalo, Montrouge, France	
123	Win	94–22–7	Christian Gempeler	TKO	5 (12)	15 Aug 1922	Royan, France	
122	Win	93–22–7	André Routis	PTS	15	18 Jun 1922	Casablanca, French Morocco	Retained European and French bantamweight titles
121	Win	92–22–7	Tommy Harrison	PTS	20	24 Apr 1922	Liverpool Stadium, Liverpool, Merseyside, England, UK	Won European bantamweight title
120	Loss	91–22–7	Eugène Criqui	KO	1 (15), 1:23	5 Feb 1922	Velodrome d'Hiver, Paris, France	
119	Loss	91–21–7	Tommy Harrison	PTS	20	24 Oct 1921	Palais de Danse, Hanley, Staffordshire, England, UK	Lost European bantamweight title
118	Loss	91–20–7	Pete Herman	NWS	10	5 Sep 1921	Louisiana Auditorium, New Orleans, Louisiana, US	
117	Loss	91–19–7	Danny Kramer	NWS	8	24 Aug 1921	Shibe Park, Philadelphia, Pennsylvania, US	
116	Loss	91–18–7	Johnny Buff	PTS	10	10 Aug 1921	Boxing Drome, New York City, New York, US	
115	Loss	91–17–7	Joe Burman	PTS	12	12 Jul 1921	Boxing Drome, New York City, New York, US	
114	Win	91–16–7	Percy Barnes	KO	5 (10)	11 Jun 1921	Alhambra, Bordeaux, France	
113	Win	90–16–7	Christian Gempeler	KO	3 (15)	18 May 1921	Iris Park, Barcelona, Spain	
112	Win	89–16–7	Robert Dastillon	KO	1 (10)	30 Apr 1921	Velodrome d'Hiver, Paris, France	
111	Win	88–16–7	Bill Beynon	KO	4 (10)	23 Mar 1921	Salle Wagram, Paris, France	
110	Loss	87–16–7	Kid Williams	PTS	12	16 Dec 1920	5th Regiment Armory, Baltimore, Maryland, US	
109	Draw	87–15–7	Joe Burman	PTS	10	26 Nov 1920	Infantry Hall, Providence, Rhode Island, US	
108	Draw	87–15–6	Mickey Delmont	NWS	10	19 Nov 1920	Mount Royal Arena, Montreal, Canada	
107	Loss	87–15–5	Jackie Sharkey	PTS	15	15 Oct 1920	Madison Square Garden, New York City, New York, US	
106	Loss	87–14–5	Joe Burman	NWS	8	20 Sep 1920	Olympia A.C., Philadelphia, Pennsylvania, US	
105	Win	87–13–5	Johnny Fisse	KO	5 (10)	4 Aug 1920	Mount Royal Arena, Montreal, Canada	
104	Loss	86–13–5	Joe Lynch	NWS	12	2 Aug 1920	Armory A.A., Jersey City, New Jersey, US	
103	Win	86–12–5	Kid Lewis	KO	7 (10)	7 Jul 1920	Mount Royal Arena, Montreal, Canada	
102	Win	85–12–5	Kid Lewis	KO	5 (12)	5 Jul 1920	Montreal, Quebec, Canada	
101	Loss	84–12–5	Joe Burman	NWS	8	23 Jun 1920	Ice Palace, Philadelphia, Pennsylvania, US	
100	Win	84–11–5	Jim Higgins	KO	11 (20)	31 May 1920	National Sporting Club, Covent Garden, London, England, UK	Retained European bantamweight title
99	Win	83–11–5	Ted Jack Williams	KO	2 (15)	23 Apr 1920	Salle de l'Orangerie, Nevers, France	
98	Win	82–11–5	Percy Barnes	KO	4 (15)	7 Apr 1920	Music-Hall Oger, Lyon, France	
97	Win	81–11–5	Johnny Coulon	KO	6 (15)	16 Mar 1920	Cirque de Paris, Paris, France	
96	Win	80–11–5	George Langham	KO	5 (20)	18 Feb 1920	Alhambra, Bordeaux, France	
95	Win	79–11–5	Christian Gempeler	TKO	6 (10)	2 Feb 1920	Alhambra, Bordeaux, France	
94	Win	78–11–5	Walter 'Young' Ross	RTD	12 (12)	13 Dec 1919	Cirque de Paris, Paris, France	Won vacant European bantamweight title
93	Win	77–11–5	Gaston Cassini	KO	5 (10)	9 Nov 1919	Casino de la Plage, Marseille, France	
92	Win	76–11–5	Jim Driscoll	RTD	6 (20)	20 Oct 1919	National Sporting Club, Covent Garden, London, England, UK	Won vacant European featherweight title
91	Win	75–11–5	Joe Bainbridge	KO	3 (12)	1 Oct 1919	Salle Wagram, Paris, France	
90	Win	74–11–5	Credeville	KO	4 (15)	11 Sep 1919	Salle de l'Orangerie, Nevers, France	
89	Win	73–11–5	Albert Cuendet	KO	3 (10)	7 Aug 1919	Casino de Deauville, Deauville, France	
88	Win	72–11–5	Tommy Noble	KO	10 (20)	31 Jul 1919	Cirque de Paris, Paris, France	
87	Win	71–11–5	Cherubin Durocher	KO	1 (20)	17 Jul 1919	Salle Wagram, Paris, France	Retained French bantamweight title
86	Draw	70–11–5	Spike Webb	PTS	6	4 Oct 1918	Verdun, France	
85	Win	70–11–4	Eugène Criqui	TKO	12 (20)	10 Jul 1914	Élysée Montmartre, Paris, France	
84	Win	69–11–4	Curley Walker	TKO	5 (10)	29 Jun 1914	National Sporting Club, Covent Garden, London, England, UK	
83	Win	68–11–4	Lucien Armanet	KO	5 (10)	14 Jun 1914	Place du Champ-de-Mars, Beziers, France	
82	Win	67–11–4	Lucien Armanet	PTS	6	7 Jun 1914	Corbeil-Essonnes, France	
81	Win	66–11–4	Cherubin Durocher	RTD	3 (15)	5 Jun 1914	Élysée Montmartre, Paris, France	
80	Win	65–11–4	Johnny Hughes	KO	7 (20)	2 May 1914	Cardiff Rink, Cardiff, Wales, UK	Retained European bantamweight title
79	Win	64–11–4	Bill Beynon	RTD	9 (20)	7 Feb 1914	American Skating Rink, Cardiff, Wales, UK	
78	Win	63–11–4	Bill Beynon	RTD	7 (20)	27 Dec 1913	American Skating Rink, Cardiff, Wales, UK	Retained European bantamweight title
77	Win	62–11–4	Marcel Lepreux	KO	11 (12)	12 Dec 1913	Élysée Montmartre, Paris, France	Retained French bantamweight title
76	Win	61–11–4	Sid Smith	RTD	6 (20)	24 Oct 1913	Élysée Montmartre, Paris, France	
75	Loss	60–11–4	Kid Williams	TKO	16 (20)	15 Jul 1913	Arena, Vernon, California, US	For vacant world bantamweight title claim
74	Loss	60–10–4	Eddie Campi	PTS	20	24 Jun 1913	Arena, Vernon, California, US	For inaugural IBU bantamweight title
73	Draw	60–9–4	Phil McGovern	PTS	12	10 Jun 1913	Arena (Atlas A.A.), Boston, Massachusetts, US	
72	Win	60–9–3	Robert Dastillon	KO	6 (20)	21 May 1913	Cirque de Paris, Paris, France	Retained European and French bantamweight titles
71	Win	59–9–3	Arthur Wyns	KO	6 (15)	2 May 1913	Élysée Montmartre, Paris, France	Retained European bantamweight title
70	Win	58–9–3	Joe Jackson	KO	5 (15)	10 Apr 1913	Grande Taverne, Nevers, France	
69	Loss	57–9–3	Kid Williams	NWS	6	11 Dec 1912	National A.C., Philadelphia, Pennsylvania, US	
68	Win	57–8–3	Frankie Conway	NWS	6	28 Nov 1912	National A.C., Philadelphia, Pennsylvania, US	
67	Win	56–8–3	Battling Reddy	NWS	10	20 Nov 1912	Fairmont A.C., New York City, New York, US	
66	Win	55–8–3	Georges Gaillard	DQ	7 (15)	16 Oct 1912	Cirque de Paris, Paris, France	Retained world, European, and French bantamweight titles
65	Win	54–8–3	Sam Minto	KO	9 (10)	11 Oct 1912	Élysée Montmartre, Paris, France	
64	Win	53–8–3	Jim Maher	KO	5 (?)	16 Sep 1912	Casino-Kursaal, Lyon, France	
63	Win	52–8–3	George Burns	KO	1 (10)	9 Sep 1912	Villa des Fleurs, Aix-les-Bains, France	
62	Win	51–8–3	George Burns	KO	2 (10)	22 Aug 1912	Kursaal, Boulogne-sur-Mer, France	
61	Win	50–8–3	George Burns	KO	3 (?)	18 Aug 1912	Théâtre Municipal, Cosne-Cours-sur-Loire, France	
60	Win	49–8–3	George Burns	KO	3 (20)	17 Aug 1912	Salle de l'Orangerie, Nevers, France	
59	Win	48–8–3	George Burns	KO	3 (?)	15 Aug 1912	Salle des Fêtes, Corbigny, France	
58	Win	47–8–3	Digger Stanley	KO	7 (10)	23 Jun 1912	Grand Hall des Magasins Généraux, Dieppe, France	Won world and European bantamweight titles
57	Win	46–8–3	Georges Gaillard	TKO	11 (15)	1 Jun 1912	Salle Wagram, Paris, France	Retained French bantamweight title
56	Win	45–8–3	Jack 'Kid' Greenstock	KO	8 (10)	4 May 1912	Wonderland, Paris, France	
55	Loss	44–8–3	Digger Stanley	PTS	20	22 Apr 1912	National Sporting Club, Covent Garden, London, England, UK	For world and European bantamweight titles
54	Loss	44–7–3	Georges Gaillard	PTS	10	20 Mar 1912	Salle Wagram, Paris, France	
53	Win	44–6–3	Eddie Stanton	KO	3 (10)	1 Mar 1912	Élysée Montmartre, Paris, France	
52	Win	43–6–3	Joe Bowker	TKO	10 (15)	29 Jan 1912	National Sporting Club, Covent Garden, London, England, UK	
51	Win	42–6–3	George Burns	KO	2 (8)	23 Dec 1911	Hippodrome Lillois, Lille, France	
50	Win	41–6–3	Louis Carbonell	KO	3 (10)	30 Nov 1911	Palais de la Boxe, Paris, France	
49	Win	40–6–3	Kid Logan	KO	2 (10)	22 Nov 1911	Cirque de Paris, Paris, France	
48	Win	39–6–3	Bill Ladbury	RTD	4 (10)	8 Nov 1911	Salle Wagram, Paris, France	
47	Win	38–6–3	Stoker Bill Hoskyne	KO	3 (10)	28 Oct 1911	Wonderland, Paris, France	
46	Win	37–6–3	Arthur Exall	KO	1 (10)	14 Oct 1911	Wonderland, Paris, France	
45	Win	36–6–3	Bill Kard	KO	2 (10)	22 Jun 1911	Paris, France	
44	Win	35–6–3	Charles Legrand	PTS	15	7 May 1911	National Sporting Club, Paris, France	Won French bantamweight title
43	Win	34–6–3	Lucien Dorgueille	TKO	4 (10)	8 Apr 1911	Cirque de Paris, Paris, France	
42	Win	33–6–3	Christian Gempeler	PTS	10	5 Apr 1911	Saint-Denis, France	
41	Win	32–6–3	Jack Morris	KO	2 (10)	18 Mar 1911	Wonderland, Paris, France	
40	Win	31–6–3	Jim Butler	KO	4 (10)	25 Feb 1911	Cirque de Paris, Paris, France	
39	Win	30–6–3	Buck Shine	PTS	10	4 Feb 1911	Wonderland, Paris, France	
38	Win	29–6–3	Tom Piggy Paul	KO	2 (10)	21 Jan 1911	Wonderland, Paris, France	
37	Loss	28–6–3	Johnny Hughes	PTS	10	7 Jan 1911	Cirque de Paris, Paris, France	
36	Loss	28–5–3	Johnny Hughes	PTS	20	7 Jan 1911	Cirque de Paris, Paris, France	
35	Win	28–4–3	Johnny Hughes	DQ	2 (10)	26 Nov 1910	Wonderland, Paris, France	
34	Win	27–4–3	Alf Shipp	KO	3 (10)	12 Nov 1910	Wonderland, Paris, France	
33	Win	26–4–3	Auge Grassi	PTS	6	5 Nov 1910	Salle de l'Eldorado, Nancy, France	
32	Win	25–4–3	Auge Grassi	KO	5 (?)	3 Nov 1910	Lutece Arena, Paris, France	
31	Win	24–4–3	Harry Ray	KO	5 (8)	14 Sep 1910	Hippodrome, Paris, France	
30	Win	23–4–3	Bill Kard	PTS	6	22 Jul 1910	Athletic Club de Paris, Paris, France	
29	Loss	22–4–3	Paul Til	PTS	10	1 Jul 1910	Pepiniere, Paris, France	
28	Win	22–3–3	Buck Shine	PTS	10	3 Jun 1910	Cirque de Paris, Paris, France	
27	Draw	21–3–3	Lucien Dorgueille	PTS	8	30 Apr 1910	Wonderland, Paris, France	
26	Win	21–3–2	Jack Guyon	KO	3 (10)	23 Apr 1910	Cirque de Paris, Paris, France	
25	Win	20–3–2	Lucien Dorgueille	PTS	8	16 Apr 1910	Cirque de Paris, Paris, France	
24	Loss	19–3–2	Bill Ladbury	RTD	4 (10)	8 Jan 1910	Wonderland, Paris, France	
23	Win	19–2–2	Charles Meyer	KO	2 (6)	3 Jan 1910	Paris, France	
22	Win	18–2–2	Georges Gaillard	PTS	6	22 Dec 1909	Tivoli Boxing-Hall, Paris, France	
21	Win	17–2–2	Charles Olive	KO	4 (6)	18 Dec 1909	Wonderland, Paris, France	
20	Draw	16–2–2	Marcel Mouginot	PTS	6	9 Dec 1909	Athletic Club de 1er Arrondissement, Paris, France	
19	Win	16–2–1	Achalme	KO	1 (10)	7 Dec 1909	Arenes de boxe, Paris, France	
18	Win	15–2–1	Marcel Mouginot	KO	2 (10)	28 Nov 1909	Paris, France	
17	Win	14–2–1	S. Sejourne	KO	1 (10)	27 Nov 1909	Wonderland, Paris, France	
16	Loss	13–2–1	Georges Carpentier	PTS	15	24 Nov 1909	Tivoli Boxing-Hall, Paris, France	
15	Win	13–1–1	Louis Lepine	KO	2 (10)	20 Nov 1909	Wonderland, Paris, France	
14	Win	12–1–1	R. Rigot	KO	7 (8)	10 Nov 1909	Arenes de boxe, Paris, France	
13	Win	11–1–1	G. Guiraud	KO	1 (8)	6 Nov 1909	Wonderland, Paris, France	
12	Draw	10–1–1	Laret	PTS	4	4 Nov 1909	Athletic Club de 1er Arrondissement, Paris, France	
11	Win	10–1	D. Dages	KO	1 (6)	27 Oct 1909	Arenes de boxe, Paris, France	
10	Win	9–1	R. Robert	KO	1 (6)	23 Oct 1909	Wonderland, Paris, France	
9	Win	8–1	Buster Brown	KO	1 (10)	16 Oct 1909	Wonderland, Paris, France	
8	Loss	7–1	Jules Gurit	PTS	6	15 Aug 1909	Boxing Club de Paris, Paris, France	
7	Win	7–0	Meyer	KO	1 (6)	8 Jan 1909	Paris, France	
6	Win	6–0	V. Vimard	KO	1 (10)	6 Jan 1909	Paris, France	
5	Win	5–0	T. Thibault	KO	1 (6)	5 Jan 1909	Paris, France	
4	Win	4–0	F. Frigol	KO	1 (6)	4 Jan 1909	Paris, France	
3	Win	3–0	C. Costet	KO	2 (4)	3 Jan 1909	Paris, France	
2	Win	2–0	Eddie Vauthier	KO	4 (4)	2 Jan 1909	Paris, France	
1	Win	1–0	Charles Meyer	KO	1 (4)	1 Jan 1909	Paris, France	
