= Joe Bowker =

British boxer (1881–1955)

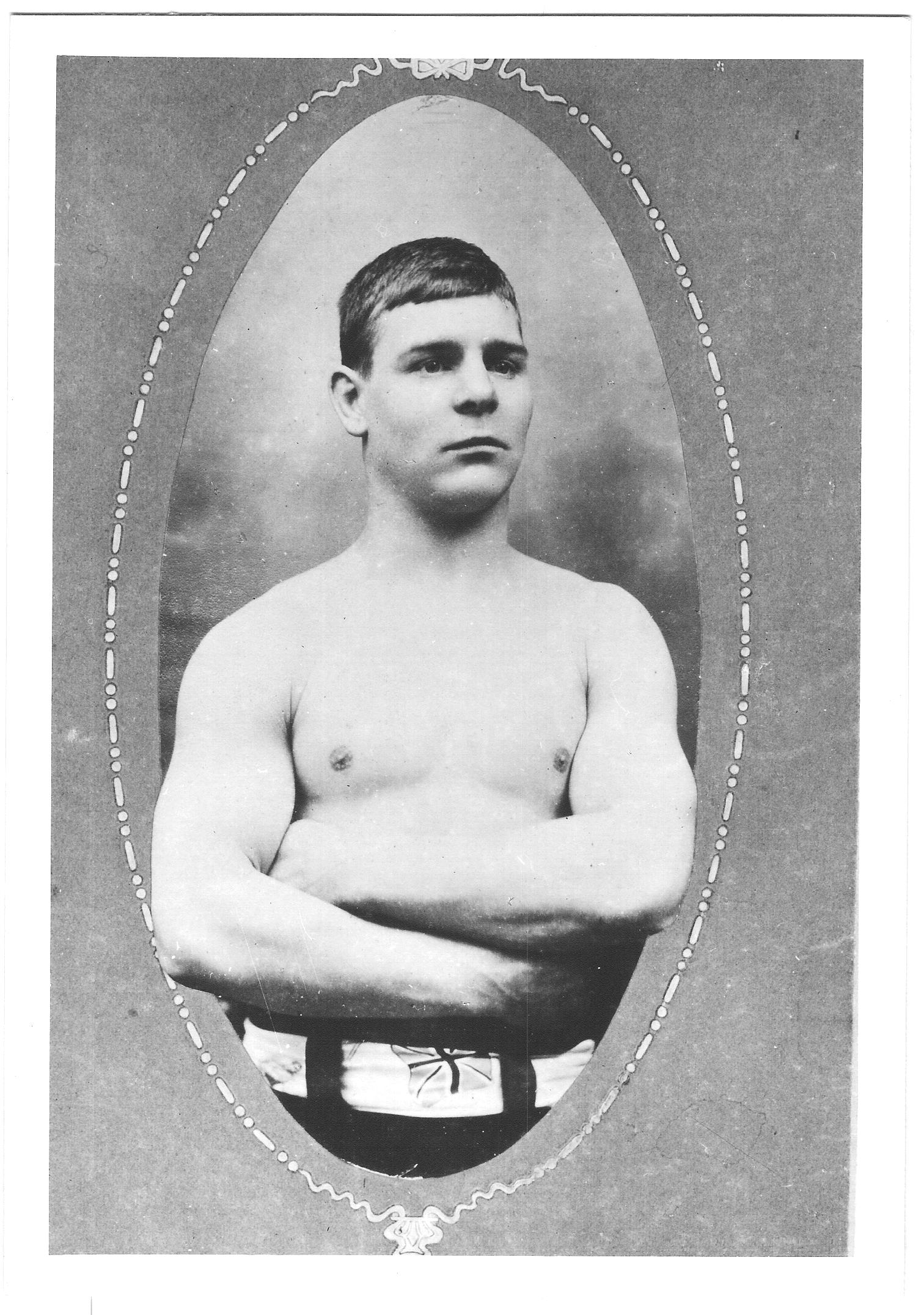

Personal information
- Nationality: British
- Born: Joe Bowker; 12 June 1881 Salford, Lancashire, England
- Died: 22 October 1955 (aged 74) London, England
- Height: 5 ft 3 1/2 in (161 cm)
- Weight: Bantamweight; Featherweight

Boxing career
- Stance: Orthodox

Boxing record
- Total fights: 58
- Wins: 43
- Win by KO: 13
- Losses: 10
- Draws: 1
- No contests: 4

Joe Bowker (12 June 1881 – 31 October 1955) was a British boxer who was world bantamweight champion from 1904 to 1905. His defeat of Frankie Neil on 17 October in London for the world bantamweight title was acclaimed as the most remarkable event in the sport in 1904.

During his career, Bowker also won the European and British bantamweight titles, and the British featherweight title, holding the world bantamweight and British featherweight titles simultaneously from March to October 1905. In 51 professional fights, he compiled a career record of 40 wins, 8 losses and one draw with two no-decisions. Fourteen wins came by knockout.

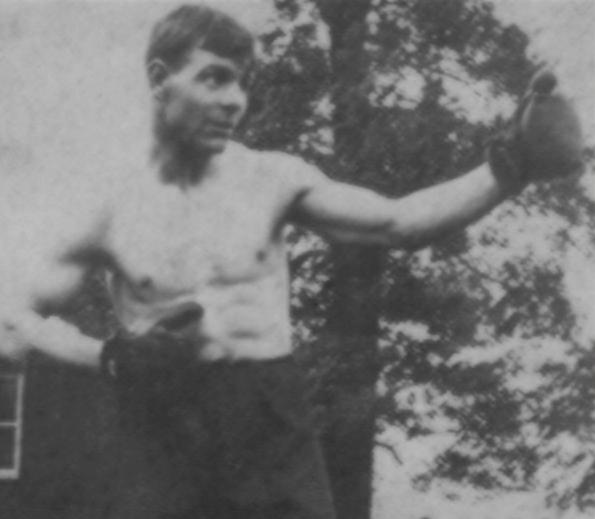
Joe Bowker, British boxer.

He was regarded as a "wonderfully clever" fighter. More than 40 years after Bowker retired from the ring, British boxing historian Maurice Golesworthy wrote of him: "Indeed, there are many authorities who rate Joe Bowker as the most skillful boxer ever produced in this country. That may be an exaggeration, but it is safe to say that there have been few better."

== Biography ==
=== Birth and early career ===
Born 12 June 1881 in Salford, England, Joseph Lord Bowker sharpened his skills in the boxing booths of England. At age 16 he joined Billy Hughes' boxing booth, defeating 60 opponents over the next four years. At the age of 20 he won a novice bantamweight competition among 64 entries at the National Sporting Club in London.

Chicago bantamweight Harry Harris, who traveled to London in 1902 to fight Pedlar Palmer for the world title, saw the young Bowker spar and was impressed with his style and poise. "He is built on the same lines as Joe Walcott," Harris said. "He has broad shoulders, a deep chest, and long, muscular arms. He is very quick but he did not impress me as being much of a puncher. As for cleverness, I think he knows more about the game than either (Billy) Plimmer or Palmer, and they were pretty gifted."

=== Winning and defending the British Bantamweight Championship ===
In a very short time Bowker was rated the best bantamweight in Britain. He defeated Harry Ware in London for the British bantamweight championship on 15 December 1902, and successfully defended his title four times, beating Andrew Tokell, Bill King, Alf Fellows, and Owen Moran. The defeat of Fellows from Chicago, on 9 November 1903 at the National Sporting Club in London, was by a ninth-round knockout.

=== Winning the World Bantamweight Championship in 1904 ===
On 17 October 1904 in London, Bowker defeated Frankie Neil of San Francisco for the world bantamweight championship. A slight favorite at 11 to 10, Bowker was behind in the early rounds and almost beaten in the ninth. From that point to the end of the 20-round bout, Bowker "greatly improved and administered plenty of punishment."

Following the fight, Jim Neil, father of Frankie Neil, protested to the referee that he thought his son should at least have earned a draw with Bowker. "Your boy swung repeatedly and missed," the referee explained to the elder Neil. "Now, if you were shooting at a bird and missed(,) that would be one for the bird, wouldn't it?"

=== Winning the British Featherweight Title in March of 1905 ===
In taking the world title from Neil, it was reported that Bowker was the "first foreigner" (non-American) to win a world boxing championship.

On 20 March 1905, in London, Bowker knocked out Thomas "Pedlar" Palmer in the twelfth round to capture the British featherweight title. Two months later, on 29 May, Bowker successfully defended his world bantamweight title with a 20-round decision over Pinky Evans of Yonkers, New York. In 1906, Bowker confessed to reporters that he was too heavy at 115 pounds to defend his title. He subsequently abandoned his world bantamweight title and moved up to the featherweight division.

=== Failure to meet Abe Attell, and fight with Jim Driscoll in May 1906 ===
What promised to be Bowker's biggest fight never materialized. Abe Attell, world featherweight champion, had decided in February 1906 to travel to London to fight the reigning world bantamweight champ. The 15-round bout was to be held in May at the National Sporting Club. Attell's title would be on the line. The match between Attell and Bowker was billed as "one of the most important international events" ever staged in England. Another report later that year had Bowker traveling to Los Angeles to take on the winner of the Attel-Neil bout. Attel defeated Neil on points on 4 July, but the Bowker-Attel fight never materialized.

The Welsh fighter, Jim Driscoll, proved to be Bowker's nemesis. Driscoll outpointed Bowker over 15 rounds in London on 28 May 1906, for the featherweight championship of Britain. In a rematch the following June, also in London, Bowker could not answer the bell after round 17.

=== Taking the Bantamweight championship of Europe in 1910 ===
On 7 May 1910, a slimmer Bowker captured his fourth boxing title with an eighth-round knockout of Jean Audouy of France for the bantamweight championship of Europe.

A controversial loss to Digger Stanley on 17 October 1910 at the National Sporting Club cost Bowker his European and British bantamweight titles. The purse for the fight was nearly $3,000. The bout ended suddenly, "a pitiful finish to a fine exhibition of boxing, in which Bowker proved himself the cleverer. But in getting down to weight Bowker weakened himself, which told in the end." The end was described by author Guy Deghy: "In the eighth round of a splendidly even battle, Bowker ducked into a righthander that struck him on the jaw, and got the next one on the kidney. While he lay on the floor, writhing in agony, the Club doctor, Dr. Gilbert Lynch, was sent for. At the end of his examination, the referee, Douglas, decided that there had been no foul, and Digger Stanley was awarded the first bantamweight Lonsdale Belt." Later, the kidney punch was banned from the sport.

=== Retirement from boxing in the early 1920s ===
After retiring from the ring, Bowker starred in boxing exhibitions. A "comedic boxing match" between Bowker and Wally Packard was on the card at London's first open air boxing contest on 31 July 1922. Bowker also worked as a fight trainer. At the 1924 Summer Olympics, he worked the corner of Harry Mallin, gold medal winner in the middleweight division. Later, he trained James O'Hanrahan who defeated Ed Tiernan in a unanimous decision at Madison Square Garden, New York, on 17 February 1925. "O'Hanrahan gave Tiernan a boxing lesson in every round and his obvious knowledge of the game and his clean punching, especially with his right hand, reflected great credit on his trainer Joe Bowker."

Bowker died in London on 22 October 1955 and lies buried in the Brockley & Ladywell Cemeteries.

== Legacy and Tommy Mahon alias ==
Bowker was one of 80 boxers included in the popular Priddy Boxing Set of "Famous Boxers," published by W.R. Priddy Antiques in 1992.

In 2008, Bowker was ranked 74th on the all-time "top 100 British boxers" list, as compiled by Ron Lewis of The London Times.

Bowker's bout against Jim Driscoll for the British featherweight championship is the subject of a famous painting by W. Howard Robinson, the noted representative artist and portrait painter of the early twentieth century. The painting, "An Evening at the National Sporting Club," completed in 1918, contains details of 329 sporting celebrities and took Robinson four years to complete.

Speculation about Bowker's date of birth, date of death, and even his real name began as early as 1908 when an Ogden's cigarette card inaccurately listed his birth date as 20 July 1882. With the discovery by family members in 2006 of Bowker's official birth, marriage and death certificates, these questions were put to rest.

A number of boxing historians have written incorrectly that Bowker's real name was Tommy Mahon and that he used Joe Bowker as an alias. The error may have originated from a book published in 1986 in which author Denis Fleming recalled a meeting with Bowker that had taken place more than a half-century earlier. Fleming wrote that Bowker had been "a 15-year-old urchin from the Salford side of Blackfriars Bridge" whose "real name was Tommy Mahon." Harry Mullen, the distinguished editor of Boxing News, perhaps assuming the accuracy of Fleming's account, perpetuated the myth. In a book published four years after Fleming's book, Mullen wrote that Bowker's real name was Tommy Mahon and that Bowker had been his mother's maiden name.

It's possible that Bowker used Tommy Mahon as an alias at prizefights he didn't want the National Sporting Club to know about, as he was under contract to fight exclusively at the NSC. It was reported that Bowker did tour with the boxing booths, as far as the west of Ireland, for extra income.

== Professional boxing record ==
58 fights	43 wins	10 losses
By knockout	13	5
By decision	29	5
By disqualification	1	0
Draws	1	
No contests	4	

No.	Result	Record	Opponent	Type	Round	Date	Location	Notes
58	Win	43–10–1 (4)	Charlie Ward	KO	15 (20)	Oct 9, 1914	New Cross Empire Theatre, New Cross, London, England	
57	Win	42–10–1 (4)	Harold Walker	PTS	6	Jul 17, 1914	Free Trade Hall, Manchester, England	
56	Win	41–10–1 (4)	Robert Dastillon	PTS	15	May 11, 1914	National Sporting Club, Covent Garden, London, England	
55	Win	40–10–1 (4)	Biz Mackey	KO	5 (10)	Feb 16, 1914	National Sporting Club, Covent Garden, London, England	
54	Win	39–10–1 (4)	Francis Charles	PTS	10	Nov 24, 1913	National Sporting Club, Covent Garden, London, England	
53	Win	38–10–1 (4)	Young Johnny Cohen	PTS	15	Feb 3, 1913	National Sporting Club, Covent Garden, London, England	
52	Loss	37–10–1 (4)	Charles Ledoux	TKO	10 (15)	Jan 29, 1912	National Sporting Club, Covent Garden, London, England	
51	Win	37–9–1 (4)	George Allen	KO	2 (?)	Dec 18, 1911	London, England	
50	Win	36–9–1 (4)	Paul Til	DQ	14 (20)	May 29, 1911	National Sporting Club, Covent Garden, London, England	
49	Win	35–9–1 (4)	Con Houghton	TKO	8 (15)	Mar 27, 1911	National Sporting Club, Covent Garden, London, England	
48	Win	34–9–1 (4)	Alec Lambert	KO	6 (15)	Dec 12, 1910	National Sporting Club, Covent Garden, London, England	
47	Loss	33–9–1 (4)	Digger Stanley	KO	8 (20)	Oct 17, 1910	National Sporting Club, Covent Garden, London, England	Lost IBU, NSC British, and world bantamweight titles
46	Win	33–8–1 (4)	Jean Audouy	RTD	8 (10)	Mar 7, 1910	National Sporting Club, Covent Garden, London, England	Retained world bantamweight title Won inaugural IBU bantamweight title
45	NC	32–8–1 (4)	Johnny Summers	ND	3	Apr 19, 1909	National Sporting Club, Covent Garden, London, England	
44	Loss	32–8–1 (3)	Tommy O'Toole	KO	2 (6)	Mar 20, 1909	National A.C., Philadelphia, Pennsylvania, U.S.	
43	Loss	32–7–1 (3)	Al Delmont	PTS	12	Mar 16, 1909	Armory A.A., Boston, Massachusetts, U.S.	
42	Loss	32–6–1 (3)	Charlie Griffin	TKO	8 (20)	Apr 27, 1908	National Sporting Club, Covent Garden, London, England	
41	Win	32–5–1 (3)	Cockney Cohen	PTS	10	Dec 16, 1907	National Sporting Club, Covent Garden, London, England	
40	Loss	31–5–1 (3)	Jim Driscoll	KO	17 (20)	Jun 3, 1907	National Sporting Club, Covent Garden, London, England	For NSC British and 122lbs English featherweight titles
39	Win	31–4–1 (3)	Harry Smith	PTS	6	Mar 2, 1907	Public Hall, Canning Town, London, England	
38	Win	30–4–1 (3)	Harry Smith	PTS	6	Feb 2, 1907	Public Hall, Barking Road, Canning Town, London, England	
37	NC	29–4–1 (3)	Young Bill Smith	ND	3	Jan 21, 1907	National Sporting Club, Covent Garden, London, England	
36	Loss	29–4–1 (2)	Jim Driscoll	PTS	15	May 28, 1906	National Sporting Club, Covent Garden, London, England	Lost NSC British and 126lbs English featherweight titles
35	Draw	29–3–1 (2)	Bill Fielder	PTS	6	Mar 14, 1906	Glasgow, Scotland	
34	Win	29–3 (2)	Spike Robson	PTS	20	Oct 23, 1905	National Sporting Club, Covent Garden, London, England	Retained NSC British and 122lbs English featherweight titles
33	Win	28–3 (2)	Wally Pickard	PTS	6	Jul 2, 1905	Nouveau Cirque, Paris, France	
32	Win	27–3 (2)	Pinky Evans	PTS	20	May 29, 1905	National Sporting Club, London, England	Retained world bantamweight title
31	NC	26–3 (2)	Johnny Boyle	ND	3	Apr 1, 1905	Waverley Market, Edinburgh, Scotland	No decision trial bout
30	Win	26–3 (1)	Pedlar Palmer	TKO	12 (20)	Mar 20, 1905	National Sporting Club, Covent Garden, London, England	Won vacant NSC British and 124lbs English featherweight titles
29	Win	25–3 (1)	Frankie Neil	PTS	20	Oct 17, 1904	National Sporting Club, Covent Garden, London, England	Won world bantamweight title
28	Win	24–3 (1)	Owen Moran	PTS	15	May 30, 1904	National Sporting Club, Covent Garden, London, England	Retained NSC British and 116lbs English bantamweight titles
27	Win	23–3 (1)	Alf Fellows	TKO	9 (15)	Nov 9, 1903	National Sporting Club, Covent Garden, London, England	Won vacant British version of world 116lbs bantamweight title
26	NC	22–3 (1)	Alf Fellows	ND	3	Oct 19, 1903	National Sporting Club, Covent Garden, London, England	No decision trial bout
25	Win	22–3	Bill King	PTS	15	Oct 5, 1903	National Sporting Club, Covent Garden, London, England	Retained NSC British and 118lbs English bantamweight titles
24	Win	21–3	Andrew Dick Tokell	PTS	15	May 25, 1903	National Sporting Club, Covent Garden, London, England	Retained NSC British and 118lbs English bantamweight titles
23	Win	20–3	Andrew Dick Tokell	PTS	15	Mar 25, 1903	National Sporting Club, Covent Garden, London, England	Retained NSC British and 116lbs English bantamweight titles
22	Win	19–3	Harry Ware	PTS	15	Dec 15, 1902	National Sporting Club, Covent Garden, London, England	Won vacant NSC British and 118lbs English bantamweight titles
21	Win	18–3	Charlie Hickman	KO	3 (15)	Sep 16, 1902	Ginnetts Circus, Newcastle, Tyne and Wear, England	
20	Win	17–3	Bill Fielder	PTS	10	Jun 2, 1902	National Sporting Club, Covent Garden, London, England	
19	Win	16–3	Jack Guyon	PTS	6	May 10, 1902	National Sporting Club, Covent Garden, London, England	
18	Win	15–3	Bill Lampshire	PTS	10	Apr 21, 1902	National Sporting Club, Covent Garden, London, England	
17	Win	14–3	Harry Paul	PTS	10	Mar 10, 1902	National Sporting Club, Covent Garden, London, England	
16	Win	13–3	Albert Wheeler	RTD	5 (?)	Feb 2, 1902	London, England	
15	Win	12–3	Jack Guyon	PTS	6	Dec 14, 1901	National Sporting Club, Covent Garden, London, England	
14	Loss	11–3	Jack Guyon	PTS	6	Jan 21, 1901	National Sporting Club, Covent Garden, London, England	
13	Win	11–2	Bill Nicholson	KO	1 (3)	Jan 14, 1901	National Sporting Club, Covent Garden, London, England	
12	Win	10–2	Buck Shine	PTS	3	Jan 14, 1901	National Sporting Club, Covent Garden, London, England	
11	Win	9–2	Wiliam Parry	KO	3 (3)	Jan 14, 1901	National Sporting Club, Covent Garden, London, England	
10	Win	8–2	John Ansell	PTS	3	Jan 14, 1901	National Sporting Club, Covent Garden, London, England	
9	Win	7–2	Ernie Waterman	PTS	3	Jan 12, 1901	National Sporting Club, Covent Garden, London, England	
8	Win	6–2	Dick Tarr	RTD	2 (3)	Jan 10, 1901	National Sporting Club, Covent Garden, London, England	
7	Loss	5–2	Jim Pennington	PTS	3	Jan 3, 1901	Boxing Club, Bolton, Lancashire, England	
6	Win	5–1	Charlie Turner	PTS	3	Jan 3, 1901	Boxing Club, Bolton, Lancashire, England	
5	Win	4–1	Bill Doyle	PTS	10	Jul 10, 1900	United Kingdom	Exact date & location unknown
4	Win	3–1	Tom Owens	PTS	10	Jun 10, 1900	United Kingdom	Exact date & location unknown
3	Win	2–1	Pat Daly	PTS	10	May 10, 1900	United Kingdom	Exact date & location unknown
2	Win	1–1	Tom Perkins	PTS	6	Jan 1, 1900	United Kingdom	Exact date & location unknown
1	Loss	0–1	Billy Pennington	PTS	4	Oct 31, 1899	Stalybridge Gymnastic Club, Stalybridge, Cheshire, England	

== See also ==
- List of bantamweight boxing champions

Sporting positions
Regional boxing titles
Preceded by Harry Ware	British Bantamweight Champion; 15 December 1902 – 17 October 1910	Succeeded by Digger Stanley
Preceded by Pedlar Palmer	British Featherweight Champion; 20 March 1905 – 28 May 1906	Succeeded by Jim Driscoll
Preceded by Jean Audouy	European Bantamweight Champion; 7 March 1910 – 17 October 1910	Succeeded by Digger Stanley
Major world boxing titles
Preceded by Frankie Neil	World Bantamweight Champion; 17 October 1904 – October 1905; Vacated	Vacant Title next held by Jimmy Walsh
