= Michel Montreuil =

Belgian boxer

Personal information
- Nationality: Belgian
- Born: 26 December 1897 Belgium
- Died: 1959 (aged 61/62)
- Height: 5 ft 3 in (160 cm)
- Weight: Featherweight, bantamweight

Boxing career

Boxing record
- Total fights: 94
- Wins: 54
- Win by KO: 16
- Losses: 25
- Draws: 14

Michel Montreuil (26 December 1897 – 1959) was a Belgian boxer who was Belgian and European champion at flyweight.

== Career ==
Montreuil first fought for a national title in February 1919, losing on points to Robert Corbiaux at flyweight. He was recognised as Belgian flyweight champion in 1921, and in February 1923 unsuccessfully challenged for Charles Ledoux's European flyweight title. He got a second shot at the European title in September that year, beating Andre Gleizes on points over 20 rounds to become champion of Europe. He made successful defences of the European title against Emile Juliard and Elky Clark, before losing it to Clark on points in January 1925.

Montreuil's form dropped off after the defeat, and over the next two years only won three fights, with six defeats in this period, including losses to George "Kid" Nicholson and Ernie Jarvis.

In February 1927, he defended his Belgian title, losing a points decision to Nicolas Petit-Biquet. In January 1929 he again faced Petit-Biquet, this time for the Belgian bantamweight title, losing on points in what proved to be his final fight.
