= Owen Moran =

English boxer

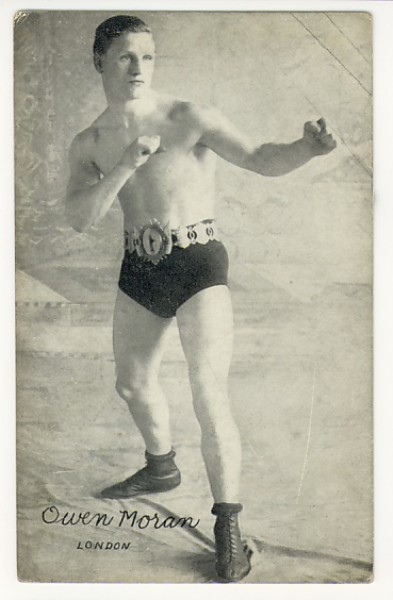

Personal information
- Nickname: The Fearless
- Nationality: English
- Born: Owen Moran; 4 October 1884 Birmingham, England
- Died: 17 March 1949 (aged 64) Birmingham, England
- Height: 5 ft 3 in (1.60 m)
- Weight: Featherweight

Boxing career
- Reach: 67 in (170 cm)
- Stance: Orthodox

Boxing record
- Total fights: 110
- Wins: 77; With the inclusion of newspaper decisions
- Win by KO: 23
- Losses: 19
- Draws: 9
- No contests: 5

Owen Moran (4 October 1884 – 17 March 1949) was an English boxer. Known as "The Fearless", Moran is recognized by some historians as a former world bantamweight champion. During his career, Moran knocked out former lightweight king Battling Nelson and also fought boxing greats Jim Driscoll, Packey McFarland, Abe Attell, Ad Wolgast, Frankie Neil and George Dixon. Moran retired in 1916 with over 100 fights. He was inducted into the International Boxing Hall of Fame in 2002.

== Professional boxing record ==
All information in this section is derived from BoxRec, unless otherwise stated.

=== Official record ===
110 fights	59 wins	16 losses
By knockout	26	2
By decision	31	9
By disqualification	2	5
Draws	7	
No contests	5	
Newspaper decisions/draws	23	

All newspaper decisions are officially regarded as “no decision” bouts and are not counted in the win/loss/draw column.

No.	Result	Record	Opponent	Type	Round	Date	Age	Location	Notes
110	Loss	59–16–7 (28)	Billy Marchant	DQ	2 (15)	Aug 21, 1916	31 years, 294 days	Free Trade Hall, Manchester, Lancashire, U.K.	
109	Win	59–15–7 (28)	Jimmy Berry	PTS	20	Jul 24, 1916	31 years, 266 days	St. James Hall, Newcastle, Tyne and Wear, U.K.	
108	Win	58–15–7 (28)	Billy Marchant	PTS	15	Jul 17, 1916	31 years, 259 days	Free Trade Hall, Manchester, Lancashire, U.K.	
107	Loss	57–15–7 (28)	Llew Edwards	DQ	10 (20)	May 31, 1915	30 years, 211 days	National Sporting Club, Covent Garden, London, England, U.K.	For vacant NSC Challenge and commonwealth featherweight titles
106	Loss	57–14–7 (28)	Joe Shugrue	TKO	7 (10)	Jan 27, 1914	29 years, 87 days	Madison Square Garden, New York City, New York, U.S.	
105	Loss	57–13–7 (28)	Joe Azevedo	DQ	6 (20)	Dec 16, 1913	29 years, 45 days	Wheelmen Club, Oakland, California, U.S.	Moran DQ'd for Intentional headbutts
104	Loss	57–12–7 (28)	Matt Wells	PTS	20	Sep 27, 1913	28 years, 330 days	Sydney Stadium, Sydney, New South Wales, Australia	
103	Draw	57–11–7 (28)	Jim Driscoll	PTS	20	Jan 27, 1913	28 years, 87 days	National Sporting Club, Covent Garden, London, England, U.K.	For IBU, NSC challenge, and Commonwealth featherweight titles
102	Win	57–11–6 (28)	Johnny Condon	PTS	20	Nov 18, 1912	28 years, 17 days	Empire Skating Rink, Sparbrook, West Midlands, England, U.K.	
101	Loss	56–11–6 (28)	Jack White	DQ	9 (12)	Jul 20, 1912	27 years, 262 days	Arena, Vernon, California, U.S.	White DQ'd for using his elbow in clinches
100	Loss	56–10–6 (28)	Charley White	DQ	9 (10)	May 20, 1912	27 years, 201 days	Alhambra, Syracuse, New York, U.S.	
99	Win	56–9–6 (28)	Freddie Duffy	NWS	12	Apr 15, 1912	27 years, 166 days	Colonial Club, Fall River, Massachusetts, U.S.	
98	Loss	56–9–6 (27)	Joe Mandot	PTS	8	Apr 1, 1912	27 years, 152 days	National A.C., Memphis, Tennessee, U.S.	
97	Draw	56–8–6 (27)	Philadelphia Pal Moore	NWS	10	Mar 12, 1912	27 years, 132 days	Fairmont A.C., New York City, New York, U.S.	
96	Win	56–8–6 (26)	Joe Bedell	NWS	10	Feb 19, 1912	27 years, 110 days	Carlyle A.C., New York City, New York, U.S.	
95	Loss	56–8–6 (25)	Ad Wolgast	KO	13 (20)	Jul 4, 1911	26 years, 245 days	Eighth Street Arena, San Francisco, California, U.S.	For world lightweight title (USA version)
94	Win	56–7–6 (25)	Phil Brock	NWS	10	May 2, 1911	26 years, 182 days	Canton, Ohio, U.S.	
93	Loss	56–7–6 (24)	Packey McFarland	NWS	10	Mar 14, 1911	26 years, 133 days	Fairmont A.C., New York City, New York, U.S.	
92	Win	56–7–6 (23)	Jack Leonard	NWS	4	Feb 3, 1911	26 years, 94 days	Gayety Theater, Philadelphia, Pennsylvania, U.S.	
91	Win	56–7–6 (22)	Frankie Smith	TKO	3 (4)	Feb 2, 1911	26 years, 93 days	Gayety Theater, Philadelphia, Pennsylvania, U.S.	
90	Win	55–7–6 (22)	Frankie Smith	NWS	4	Jan 30, 1911	26 years, 90 days	Gayety Theater, Philadelphia, Pennsylvania, U.S.	
89	Win	55–7–6 (21)	Battling Nelson	KO	11 (20)	Nov 26, 1910	26 years, 25 days	Blot's Arena, San Francisco, California, U.S.	
88	Draw	54–7–6 (21)	Abe Attell	NWS	6	Nov 9, 1910	26 years, 8 days	National A.C., Philadelphia, Pennsylvania, U.S.	
87	Draw	54–7–6 (20)	Johnny Frayne	PTS	10	Oct 16, 1910	25 years, 349 days	West Side A.C., Gretna, Louisiana, U.S.	
86	Draw	54–7–5 (20)	Philadelphia Pal Moore	PTS	12	Oct 4, 1910	25 years, 337 days	Armory A.A., Boston, Massachusetts, U.S.	
85	Win	54–7–4 (20)	Philadelphia Pal Moore	NWS	6	Sep 28, 1910	25 years, 331 days	National A.C., Philadelphia, Pennsylvania, U.S.	
84	Win	54–7–4 (19)	Oakland Frankie Burns	NWS	10	Aug 31, 1910	25 years, 303 days	Dreamland Rink, San Francisco, California, U.S.	
83	Loss	54–7–4 (18)	Abe Attell	NWS	10	Jun 24, 1910	25 years, 235 days	Naud Junction Pavilion, Los Angeles, California, U.S.	
82	Win	54–7–4 (17)	Frankie Conley	NWS	10	Jun 7, 1910	25 years, 218 days	Naud Junction Pavilion, Los Angeles, California, U.S.	
81	Win	54–7–4 (16)	Tommy McCarthy	KO	16 (20)	Apr 29, 1910	25 years, 179 days	Dreamland Rink, San Francisco, California, U.S.	McCarthy died of injuries sustained from the fight
80	Win	53–7–4 (16)	Matty Baldwin	NWS	10	Apr 5, 1910	25 years, 155 days	Fairmont A.C., New York City, New York, U.S.	
79	Loss	53–7–4 (15)	Abe Attell	NWS	10	Apr 1, 1910	25 years, 151 days	Fairmont A.C., New York City, New York, U.S.	
78	Loss	53–7–4 (14)	Harlem Tommy Murphy	PTS	20	Feb 28, 1910	25 years, 119 days	Dreamland Rink, San Francisco, California, U.S.	
77	Win	53–6–4 (14)	Matty Baldwin	PTS	12	Feb 8, 1910	25 years, 99 days	Armory A.A., Boston, Massachusetts, U.S.	
76	Loss	52–6–4 (14)	Matty Baldwin	PTS	12	Jan 25, 1910	25 years, 85 days	Armory A.A., Boston, Massachusetts, U.S.	
75	Win	52–5–4 (14)	Frankie Neil	NWS	12	Apr 26, 1909	24 years, 176 days	Anchor A.C., New Haven, Connecticut, U.S.	
74	Win	52–5–4 (13)	Harlem Tommy Murphy	PTS	12	Mar 23, 1909	24 years, 142 days	Armory A.A., Boston, Massachusetts, U.S.	
73	Win	51–5–4 (13)	Harlem Tommy Murphy	NWS	10	Mar 16, 1909	24 years, 135 days	Fairmont A.C., New York City, New York, U.S.	
72	Win	51–5–4 (12)	Tommy Langdon	NWS	6	Feb 15, 1909	24 years, 106 days	Washington S.C., Philadelphia, Pennsylvania, U.S.	
71	Win	51–5–4 (11)	Matty Baldwin	PTS	12	Feb 9, 1909	24 years, 100 days	Armory A.A., Boston, Massachusetts, U.S.	
70	Win	50–5–4 (11)	Harlem Tommy Murphy	NWS	10	Jan 29, 1909	24 years, 89 days	New Amsterdam Opera House, New York City, New York, U.S.	
69	Win	50–5–4 (10)	Young Nitchie	NWS	6	Jan 9, 1909	24 years, 69 days	National A.C., Philadelphia, Pennsylvania, U.S.	
68	Win	50–5–4 (9)	Frankie Neil	PTS	12	Dec 14, 1908	24 years, 43 days	Armory A.A., Boston, Massachusetts, U.S.	
67	Win	49–5–4 (9)	Tommy O'Toole	NWS	6	Dec 9, 1908	24 years, 38 days	National A.C., Philadelphia, Pennsylvania, U.S.	
66	Win	49–5–4 (8)	Eddie Hanlon	PTS	20	Sep 30, 1908	23 years, 334 days	Coliseum, San Francisco, California, U.S.	
65	Draw	48–5–4 (8)	Abe Attell	PTS	23	Sep 7, 1908	23 years, 311 days	Mission Street Arena, San Francisco, California, U.S.	For world featherweight title
64	Win	48–5–3 (8)	Seaman Arthur Hayes	PTS	4	Jun 15, 1908	23 years, 227 days	Curzon Hall, Birmingham, West Midlands, England, U.K.	
63	Win	47–5–3 (8)	Ad Wolgast	NWS	6	Apr 7, 1908	23 years, 158 days	National A.C., New York City, New York, U.S.	
62	Draw	47–5–3 (7)	Abe Attell	PTS	25	Jan 1, 1908	23 years, 61 days	Coffroth's Arena, Colma, California, U.S.	For world featherweight title
61	Win	47–5–2 (7)	Frankie Neil	TKO	16 (20)	Nov 22, 1907	23 years, 21 days	Dreamland Rink, San Francisco, California, U.S.	
60	Win	46–5–2 (7)	Tommy O'Toole	NWS	6	Oct 19, 1907	22 years, 352 days	National A.C., Philadelphia, Pennsylvania, U.S.	
59	Win	46–5–2 (6)	Young Pierce	KO	16 (20)	Aug 22, 1907	22 years, 294 days	Liverpool Gymnastic Club, Liverpool, Merseyside, U.K.	Billed 120lbs world title
58	Win	45–5–2 (6)	Chris Clarke	KO	2 (20)	Jul 25, 1907	22 years, 266 days	Liverpool Gymnastic Club, Liverpool, Merseyside, U.K.	Claimed English 124lbs title
57	Win	44–5–2 (6)	Al Delmont	PTS	20	Apr 22, 1907	22 years, 172 days	National Sporting Club, Covent Garden, London, England, U.K.	Claimed vacant world bantamweight title
56	Win	43–5–2 (6)	Tommy Burns	TKO	13 (20)	Nov 22, 1906	22 years, 21 days	Liverpool Gymnastic Club, Liverpool, Merseyside, U.K.	Not to be confused with Tommy Burns
55	Win	42–5–2 (6)	Billy Cunningham	KO	3 (?)	Jun 1, 1906	21 years, 212 days	United Kingdom	Exact date and venue unknown
54	Win	41–5–2 (6)	Johnny Ryan	KO	1 (?)	May 1, 1906	21 years, 181 days	United Kingdom	Exact date and venue unknown
53	Win	40–5–2 (6)	Bill Strelly	TKO	5 (6)	Apr 27, 1906	21 years, 177 days	Tivoli Theatre, Glasgow, Scotland, U.K.	
52	Win	39–5–2 (6)	Cockney Cohen	KO	3 (?)	Mar 23, 1906	21 years, 142 days	Glasgow, Scotland, U.K.	
51	Win	38–5–2 (6)	Cockney Cohen	KO	4 (20)	Feb 22, 1906	21 years, 113 days	Liverpool Gymnastic Club, Liverpool, Merseyside, England, U.K.	
50	ND	37–5–2 (6)	Jim Driscoll	ND	4 (?)	Jan 18, 1906	21 years, 78 days	Barry, Wales, U.K.	
49	Win	37–5–2 (5)	Al Fellows	KO	3 (20)	Nov 2, 1905	21 years, 1 day	Liverpool Gymnastic Club, Liverpool, Merseyside, England, U.K.	
48	ND	36–5–2 (5)	Ike Young Bradley	ND	6	Oct 19, 1905	20 years, 352 days	Corn Exchange, Worcester, Worcestershire, England, U.K.	
47	Win	36–5–2 (4)	Darkey Haley	PTS	6	Oct 2, 1905	20 years, 335 days	National Sporting Club, Covent Garden, London, England, U.K.	
46	Win	35–5–2 (4)	Jim Kenrick	KO	7 (15)	Aug 24, 1905	20 years, 296 days	Liverpool Gymnastic Club, Liverpool, Merseyside, England, U.K.	
45	Win	34–5–2 (4)	Monte Attell	PTS	20	May 15, 1905	20 years, 195 days	Palisades, New York, U.S.	
44	Win	33–5–2 (4)	Danny Dougherty	NWS	6	May 12, 1905	20 years, 192 days	Knickerbocker A.C., Philadelphia, Pennsylvania, U.S.	
43	Win	33–5–2 (3)	Bill Fielder	PTS	6	Apr 7, 1905	20 years, 157 days	Glasgow, Scotland, U.K.	
42	Win	32–5–2 (3)	Kid Crisp	KO	2 (?)	Mar 30, 1905	20 years, 149 days	Glasgow, Scotland, U.K.	
41	Win	31–5–2 (3)	Tim Homewood	KO	2 (?)	Mar 3, 1905	20 years, 122 days	Glasgow, Scotland, U.K.	
40	Win	30–5–2 (3)	Digger Stanley	PTS	20	Jan 23, 1905	20 years, 83 days	National Sporting Club, Covent Garden, London, England, U.K.	Won NSC and Commonwealth bantamweight titles
39	Win	29–5–2 (3)	Harry Ware	DQ	3 (20)	Oct 29, 1904	19 years, 363 days	Ginnetts Circus, Newcastle, Tyne and Wear, England, U.K.	billed for the English title at 8st 2lbs
38	Win	28–5–2 (3)	George Dixon	PTS	6	Oct 17, 1904	19 years, 351 days	Wonderland, Mile End, London, England, U.K.	
37	Win	27–5–2 (3)	Ted Moore	PTS	6	Oct 3, 1904	19 years, 337 days	Wonderland, Mile End, London, England, U.K.	
36	Win	26–5–2 (3)	Darkey Haley	PTS	6	Sep 3, 1904	19 years, 307 days	Wonderland, Mile End, London, England, U.K.	
35	Loss	25–5–2 (3)	Boyo Driscoll	PTS	10	Aug 1, 1904	19 years, 274 days	Queens Hall, Cardiff, Wales, U.K.	Lost English 8st title
34	Win	25–4–2 (3)	Harry Ware	PTS	6	Jul 25, 1904	19 years, 267 days	Wonderland, Mile End, London, England, U.K.	
33	Win	24–4–2 (3)	Harry Ware	PTS	6	Jul 25, 1904	19 years, 237 days	National Sporting Club, Covent Garden, London, England, U.K.	Billed English 8st title
32	Win	23–4–2 (3)	Jack Fitzpatrick	TKO	6 (15)	Jun 20, 1904	19 years, 232 days	National Sporting Club, Covent Garden, London, England, U.K.	Billed English 8st title
31	Loss	22–4–2 (3)	Joe Bowker	PTS	15	May 30, 1904	19 years, 211 days	National Sporting Club, Covent Garden, London, England, U.K.	For NSC British bantamweight title
30	Win	22–3–2 (3)	Jack Walker	KO	2 (6)	Apr 30, 1904	19 years, 181 days	Wonderland, Mile End, London, England, U.K.	
29	Draw	21–3–2 (3)	George Moore	PTS	6	Apr 16, 1904	19 years, 167 days	Wonderland, Mile End, London, England, U.K.	
28	Win	21–3–1 (3)	Andrew Dick Tokell	PTS	12	Mar 7, 1904	19 years, 127 days	Wonderland, Mile End, London, England, U.K.	
27	Win	20–3–1 (3)	Dave Morbin	PTS	6	Jan 30, 1904	19 years, 90 days	Wonderland, Mile End, London, England, U.K.	
26	ND	19–3–1 (3)	Tibby Watson	ND	3 (?)	Jan 19, 1904	19 years, 79 days	Albion Hall, Stockbridge, Hampshire, England, U.K.	
25	Draw	19–3–1 (2)	Aschel "Young" Joseph	PTS	12	Jan 18, 1904	19 years, 78 days	Wonderland, Mile End, London, England, U.K.	
24	ND	19–3 (2)	Tibby Watson	ND	3 (?)	Jan 16, 1904	19 years, 76 days	The Harriers, Edinburgh, Scotland, U.K.	An exhibition bout
23	Loss	19–3 (1)	Digger Stanley	PTS	15	Nov 9, 1903	19 years, 8 days	National Sporting Club, Covent Garden, London, England, U.K.	Lost NSC British flyweight title
22	Win	19–2 (1)	Jack Fitzpatrick	PTS	10	Sep 14, 1903	18 years, 317 days	Jem Mace's Gymnasium, Birmingham, West Midlands, England, U.K.	
21	Win	18–2 (1)	Bob Kendrick	KO	6 (6)	Jul 18, 1903	18 years, 259 days	Wonderland, Mile End, London, England, U.K.	
20	Win	17–2 (1)	Tibby Watson	PTS	4 (15)	Jun 26, 1903	18 years, 237 days	Birmingham, West Midlands, England, U.K.	
19	Win	16–2 (1)	Jack Walker	PTS	15	May 25, 1903	18 years, 205 days	National Sporting Club, Covent Garden, London, England, U.K.	Won vacant NSC British flyweight title
18	Win	15–2 (1)	Ernie Moody	KO	7 (10)	Mar 30, 1903	18 years, 149 days	National Sporting Club, Covent Garden, London, England, U.K.	
17	Win	14–2 (1)	Tom King	PTS	10	Feb 23, 1903	18 years, 114 days	Jem Mace's Gymnasium, Birmingham, West Midlands, England, U.K.	
16	Win	13–2 (1)	Jack Morris	KO	2 (20)	Dec 29, 1902	18 years, 58 days	Coronation Gymnasium, Liverpool, Merseyside, England, U.K.	Moran claimed English 110lbs title
15	Loss	12–2 (1)	Fred Herring	PTS	10	Dec 1, 1902	18 years, 30 days	National Sporting Club, Covent Garden, London, England, U.K.	
14	Win	12–1 (1)	Dave Job	PTS	8	Oct 31, 1902	17 years, 364 days	Birmingham, West Midlands, England, U.K.	
13	ND	11–1 (1)	Jim Glover	ND	4	Sep 22, 1902	17 years, 325 days	Pretoria Gymnasium, Birmingham, West Midlands, England, U.K.	No decision trial bout
12	Win	11–1	Johnny Hughes	DQ	5 (10)	Jun 30, 1902	17 years, 241 days	National Sporting Club, Covent Garden, London, England, U.K.	
11	Win	10–1	Jim Kenrick	PTS	10	May 12, 1902	17 years, 192 days	National Sporting Club, Covent Garden, London, England, U.K.	Won vacant NSC British light flyweight title
10	Win	9–1	Charlie Smirke	TKO	4 (10)	Feb 24, 1902	17 years, 115 days	National Sporting Club, Covent Garden, London, England, U.K.	
9	Win	8–1	Harry Root	PTS	10	Dec 14, 1901	17 years, 43 days	National Sporting Club, Covent Garden, London, England, U.K.	
8	Win	7–1	Harry Young Slough	PTS	15	Oct 9, 1901	16 years, 342 days	Mafeking Gym, Leicester, Leicestershire, U.K.	billed English 102lbs title
7	Loss	6–1	Digger Stanley	PTS	20	Jun 17, 1901	16 years, 228 days	Slaney Street Assembly Rooms, Birmingham, West Midlands, U.K.	
6	Win	6–0	Ernie Godwin	PTS	8	Mar 11, 1901	16 years, 130 days	Slaney Street Assembly Rooms, Birmingham, West Midlands, U.K.	
5	Win	5–0	Jack Moore	PTS	4	Feb 22, 1901	16 years, 113 days	Slaney Street Assembly Rooms, Birmingham, West Midlands, U.K.	
4	Win	4–0	Johnny Hughes	PTS	6	Feb 5, 1901	16 years, 96 days	Worcester City Boxing Club, Worcester, Worcestershire, U.K.	
3	Win	3–0	Tom Frogatt	KO	4 (6)	Feb 5, 1901	16 years, 96 days	Worcester City Boxing Club, Worcester, Worcestershire, U.K.	
2	Win	2–0	Tom Frogatt	KO	3 (8)	Dec 3, 1900	16 years, 32 days	Harry Cullis's Boxing Booth, Birmingham, West Midlands, U.K.	
1	Win	1–0	Bill Lovesey	KO	2 (8)	Nov 26, 1900	16 years, 25 days	Harry Cullis's Boxing Booth, Birmingham, West Midlands, U.K.	

=== Unofficial record ===
110 fights	77 wins	19 losses
By knockout	26	2
By decision	49	12
By disqualification	2	5
Draws	9	
No contests	5	

Record with the inclusion of newspaper decisions in the win/loss/draw column.

No.	Result	Record	Opponent	Type	Round	Date	Age	Location	Notes
110	Loss	77–19–9 (5)	Billy Marchant	DQ	2 (15)	Aug 21, 1916	31 years, 294 days	Free Trade Hall, Manchester, Lancashire, U.K.	
109	Win	77–18–9 (5)	Jimmy Berry	PTS	20	Jul 24, 1916	31 years, 266 days	St. James Hall, Newcastle, Tyne and Wear, U.K.	
108	Win	76–18–9 (5)	Billy Marchant	PTS	15	Jul 17, 1916	31 years, 259 days	Free Trade Hall, Manchester, Lancashire, U.K.	
107	Loss	75–18–9 (5)	Llew Edwards	DQ	10 (20)	May 31, 1915	30 years, 211 days	National Sporting Club, Covent Garden, London, England, U.K.	For vacant NSC Challenge and commonwealth featherweight titles
106	Loss	75–17–9 (5)	Joe Shugrue	TKO	7 (10)	Jan 27, 1914	29 years, 87 days	Madison Square Garden, New York City, New York, U.S.	
105	Loss	75–16–9 (5)	Joe Azevedo	DQ	6 (20)	Dec 16, 1913	29 years, 45 days	Wheelmen Club, Oakland, California, U.S.	Moran DQ'd for Intentional headbutts
104	Loss	75–15–9 (5)	Matt Wells	PTS	20	Sep 27, 1913	28 years, 330 days	Sydney Stadium, Sydney, New South Wales, Australia	
103	Draw	75–14–9 (5)	Jim Driscoll	PTS	20	Jan 27, 1913	28 years, 87 days	National Sporting Club, Covent Garden, London, England, U.K.	For IBU, NSC challenge, and Commonwealth featherweight titles
102	Win	75–14–8 (5)	Johnny Condon	PTS	20	Nov 18, 1912	28 years, 17 days	Empire Skating Rink, Sparbrook, West Midlands, England, U.K.	
101	Loss	74–14–8 (5)	Jack White	DQ	9 (12)	Jul 20, 1912	27 years, 262 days	Arena, Vernon, California, U.S.	White DQ'd for using his elbow in clinches
100	Loss	74–13–8 (5)	Charley White	DQ	9 (10)	May 20, 1912	27 years, 201 days	Alhambra, Syracuse, New York, U.S.	
99	Win	74–12–8 (5)	Freddie Duffy	NWS	12	Apr 15, 1912	27 years, 166 days	Colonial Club, Fall River, Massachusetts, U.S.	
98	Loss	73–12–8 (5)	Joe Mandot	PTS	8	Apr 1, 1912	27 years, 152 days	National A.C., Memphis, Tennessee, U.S.	
97	Draw	73–11–8 (5)	Philadelphia Pal Moore	NWS	10	Mar 12, 1912	27 years, 132 days	Fairmont A.C., New York City, New York, U.S.	
96	Win	73–11–7 (5)	Joe Bedell	NWS	10	Feb 19, 1912	27 years, 110 days	Carlyle A.C., New York City, New York, U.S.	
95	Loss	72–11–7 (5)	Ad Wolgast	KO	13 (20)	Jul 4, 1911	26 years, 245 days	Eighth Street Arena, San Francisco, California, U.S.	For world lightweight title (USA version)
94	Win	72–10–7 (5)	Phil Brock	NWS	10	May 2, 1911	26 years, 182 days	Canton, Ohio, U.S.	
93	Loss	71–10–7 (5)	Packey McFarland	NWS	10	Mar 14, 1911	26 years, 133 days	Fairmont A.C., New York City, New York, U.S.	
92	Win	71–9–7 (5)	Jack Leonard	NWS	4	Feb 3, 1911	26 years, 94 days	Gayety Theater, Philadelphia, Pennsylvania, U.S.	
91	Win	70–9–7 (5)	Frankie Smith	TKO	3 (4)	Feb 2, 1911	26 years, 93 days	Gayety Theater, Philadelphia, Pennsylvania, U.S.	
90	Win	69–9–7 (5)	Frankie Smith	NWS	4	Jan 30, 1911	26 years, 90 days	Gayety Theater, Philadelphia, Pennsylvania, U.S.	
89	Win	68–9–7 (5)	Battling Nelson	KO	11 (20)	Nov 26, 1910	26 years, 25 days	Blot's Arena, San Francisco, California, U.S.	
88	Draw	67–9–7 (5)	Abe Attell	NWS	6	Nov 9, 1910	26 years, 8 days	National A.C., Philadelphia, Pennsylvania, U.S.	
87	Draw	67–9–6 (5)	Johnny Frayne	PTS	10	Oct 16, 1910	25 years, 349 days	West Side A.C., Gretna, Louisiana, U.S.	
86	Draw	67–9–5 (5)	Philadelphia Pal Moore	PTS	12	Oct 4, 1910	25 years, 337 days	Armory A.A., Boston, Massachusetts, U.S.	
85	Win	67–9–4 (5)	Philadelphia Pal Moore	NWS	6	Sep 28, 1910	25 years, 331 days	National A.C., Philadelphia, Pennsylvania, U.S.	
84	Win	66–9–4 (5)	Oakland Frankie Burns	NWS	10	Aug 31, 1910	25 years, 303 days	Dreamland Rink, San Francisco, California, U.S.	
83	Loss	65–9–4 (5)	Abe Attell	NWS	10	Jun 24, 1910	25 years, 235 days	Naud Junction Pavilion, Los Angeles, California, U.S.	
82	Win	65–8–4 (5)	Frankie Conley	NWS	10	Jun 7, 1910	25 years, 218 days	Naud Junction Pavilion, Los Angeles, California, U.S.	
81	Win	64–8–4 (5)	Tommy McCarthy	KO	16 (20)	Apr 29, 1910	25 years, 179 days	Dreamland Rink, San Francisco, California, U.S.	McCarthy died of injuries sustained from the fight
80	Win	63–8–4 (5)	Matty Baldwin	NWS	10	Apr 5, 1910	25 years, 155 days	Fairmont A.C., New York City, New York, U.S.	
79	Loss	62–8–4 (5)	Abe Attell	NWS	10	Apr 1, 1910	25 years, 151 days	Fairmont A.C., New York City, New York, U.S.	
78	Loss	62–7–4 (5)	Harlem Tommy Murphy	PTS	20	Feb 28, 1910	25 years, 119 days	Dreamland Rink, San Francisco, California, U.S.	
77	Win	62–6–4 (5)	Matty Baldwin	PTS	12	Feb 8, 1910	25 years, 99 days	Armory A.A., Boston, Massachusetts, U.S.	
76	Loss	61–6–4 (5)	Matty Baldwin	PTS	12	Jan 25, 1910	25 years, 85 days	Armory A.A., Boston, Massachusetts, U.S.	
75	Win	61–5–4 (5)	Frankie Neil	NWS	12	Apr 26, 1909	24 years, 176 days	Anchor A.C., New Haven, Connecticut, U.S.	
74	Win	60–5–4 (5)	Harlem Tommy Murphy	PTS	12	Mar 23, 1909	24 years, 142 days	Armory A.A., Boston, Massachusetts, U.S.	
73	Win	59–5–4 (5)	Harlem Tommy Murphy	NWS	10	Mar 16, 1909	24 years, 135 days	Fairmont A.C., New York City, New York, U.S.	
72	Win	58–5–4 (5)	Tommy Langdon	NWS	6	Feb 15, 1909	24 years, 106 days	Washington S.C., Philadelphia, Pennsylvania, U.S.	
71	Win	57–5–4 (5)	Matty Baldwin	PTS	12	Feb 9, 1909	24 years, 100 days	Armory A.A., Boston, Massachusetts, U.S.	
70	Win	56–5–4 (5)	Harlem Tommy Murphy	NWS	10	Jan 29, 1909	24 years, 89 days	New Amsterdam Opera House, New York City, New York, U.S.	
69	Win	55–5–4 (5)	Young Nitchie	NWS	6	Jan 9, 1909	24 years, 69 days	National A.C., Philadelphia, Pennsylvania, U.S.	
68	Win	54–5–4 (5)	Frankie Neil	PTS	12	Dec 14, 1908	24 years, 43 days	Armory A.A., Boston, Massachusetts, U.S.	
67	Win	53–5–4 (5)	Tommy O'Toole	NWS	6	Dec 9, 1908	24 years, 38 days	National A.C., Philadelphia, Pennsylvania, U.S.	
66	Win	52–5–4 (5)	Eddie Hanlon	PTS	20	Sep 30, 1908	23 years, 334 days	Coliseum, San Francisco, California, U.S.	
65	Draw	51–5–4 (5)	Abe Attell	PTS	23	Sep 7, 1908	23 years, 311 days	Mission Street Arena, San Francisco, California, U.S.	For world featherweight title
64	Win	51–5–3 (5)	Seaman Arthur Hayes	PTS	4	Jun 15, 1908	23 years, 227 days	Curzon Hall, Birmingham, West Midlands, England, U.K.	
63	Win	50–5–3 (5)	Ad Wolgast	NWS	6	Apr 7, 1908	23 years, 158 days	National A.C., New York City, New York, U.S.	
62	Draw	49–5–3 (5)	Abe Attell	PTS	25	Jan 1, 1908	23 years, 61 days	Coffroth's Arena, Colma, California, U.S.	For world featherweight title
61	Win	49–5–2 (5)	Frankie Neil	TKO	16 (20)	Nov 22, 1907	23 years, 21 days	Dreamland Rink, San Francisco, California, U.S.	
60	Win	48–5–2 (5)	Tommy O'Toole	NWS	6	Oct 19, 1907	22 years, 352 days	National A.C., Philadelphia, Pennsylvania, U.S.	
59	Win	47–5–2 (5)	Young Pierce	KO	16 (20)	Aug 22, 1907	22 years, 294 days	Liverpool Gymnastic Club, Liverpool, Merseyside, U.K.	Billed 120lbs world title
58	Win	46–5–2 (5)	Chris Clarke	KO	2 (20)	Jul 25, 1907	22 years, 266 days	Liverpool Gymnastic Club, Liverpool, Merseyside, U.K.	Claimed English 124lbs title
57	Win	45–5–2 (5)	Al Delmont	PTS	20	Apr 22, 1907	22 years, 172 days	National Sporting Club, Covent Garden, London, England, U.K.	Claimed vacant world bantamweight title
56	Win	44–5–2 (5)	Tommy Burns	TKO	13 (20)	Nov 22, 1906	22 years, 21 days	Liverpool Gymnastic Club, Liverpool, Merseyside, U.K.	Not to be confused with Tommy Burns
55	Win	43–5–2 (5)	Billy Cunningham	KO	3 (?)	Jun 1, 1906	21 years, 212 days	United Kingdom	Exact date and venue unknown
54	Win	42–5–2 (5)	Johnny Ryan	KO	1 (?)	May 1, 1906	21 years, 181 days	United Kingdom	Exact date and venue unknown
53	Win	41–5–2 (5)	Bill Strelly	TKO	5 (6)	Apr 27, 1906	21 years, 177 days	Tivoli Theatre, Glasgow, Scotland, U.K.	
52	Win	40–5–2 (5)	Cockney Cohen	KO	3 (?)	Mar 23, 1906	21 years, 142 days	Glasgow, Scotland, U.K.	
51	Win	39–5–2 (5)	Cockney Cohen	KO	4 (20)	Feb 22, 1906	21 years, 113 days	Liverpool Gymnastic Club, Liverpool, Merseyside, England, U.K.	
50	ND	38–5–2 (5)	Jim Driscoll	ND	4 (?)	Jan 18, 1906	21 years, 78 days	Barry, Wales, U.K.	
49	Win	38–5–2 (4)	Al Fellows	KO	3 (20)	Nov 2, 1905	21 years, 1 day	Liverpool Gymnastic Club, Liverpool, Merseyside, England, U.K.	
48	ND	37–5–2 (4)	Ike Young Bradley	ND	6	Oct 19, 1905	20 years, 352 days	Corn Exchange, Worcester, Worcestershire, England, U.K.	
47	Win	37–5–2 (3)	Darkey Haley	PTS	6	Oct 2, 1905	20 years, 335 days	National Sporting Club, Covent Garden, London, England, U.K.	
46	Win	36–5–2 (3)	Jim Kenrick	KO	7 (15)	Aug 24, 1905	20 years, 296 days	Liverpool Gymnastic Club, Liverpool, Merseyside, England, U.K.	
45	Win	35–5–2 (3)	Monte Attell	PTS	20	May 15, 1905	20 years, 195 days	Palisades, New York, U.S.	
44	Win	34–5–2 (3)	Danny Dougherty	NWS	6	May 12, 1905	20 years, 192 days	Knickerbocker A.C., Philadelphia, Pennsylvania, U.S.	
43	Win	33–5–2 (3)	Bill Fielder	PTS	6	Apr 7, 1905	20 years, 157 days	Glasgow, Scotland, U.K.	
42	Win	32–5–2 (3)	Kid Crisp	KO	2 (?)	Mar 30, 1905	20 years, 149 days	Glasgow, Scotland, U.K.	
41	Win	31–5–2 (3)	Tim Homewood	KO	2 (?)	Mar 3, 1905	20 years, 122 days	Glasgow, Scotland, U.K.	
40	Win	30–5–2 (3)	Digger Stanley	PTS	20	Jan 23, 1905	20 years, 83 days	National Sporting Club, Covent Garden, London, England, U.K.	Won NSC and Commonwealth bantamweight titles
39	Win	29–5–2 (3)	Harry Ware	DQ	3 (20)	Oct 29, 1904	19 years, 363 days	Ginnetts Circus, Newcastle, Tyne and Wear, England, U.K.	billed for the English title at 8st 2lbs
38	Win	28–5–2 (3)	George Dixon	PTS	6	Oct 17, 1904	19 years, 351 days	Wonderland, Mile End, London, England, U.K.	
37	Win	27–5–2 (3)	Ted Moore	PTS	6	Oct 3, 1904	19 years, 337 days	Wonderland, Mile End, London, England, U.K.	
36	Win	26–5–2 (3)	Darkey Haley	PTS	6	Sep 3, 1904	19 years, 307 days	Wonderland, Mile End, London, England, U.K.	
35	Loss	25–5–2 (3)	Boyo Driscoll	PTS	10	Aug 1, 1904	19 years, 274 days	Queens Hall, Cardiff, Wales, U.K.	Lost English 8st title
34	Win	25–4–2 (3)	Harry Ware	PTS	6	Jul 25, 1904	19 years, 267 days	Wonderland, Mile End, London, England, U.K.	
33	Win	24–4–2 (3)	Harry Ware	PTS	6	Jul 25, 1904	19 years, 237 days	National Sporting Club, Covent Garden, London, England, U.K.	Billed English 8st title
32	Win	23–4–2 (3)	Jack Fitzpatrick	TKO	6 (15)	Jun 20, 1904	19 years, 232 days	National Sporting Club, Covent Garden, London, England, U.K.	Billed English 8st title
31	Loss	22–4–2 (3)	Joe Bowker	PTS	15	May 30, 1904	19 years, 211 days	National Sporting Club, Covent Garden, London, England, U.K.	For NSC British bantamweight title
30	Win	22–3–2 (3)	Jack Walker	KO	2 (6)	Apr 30, 1904	19 years, 181 days	Wonderland, Mile End, London, England, U.K.	
29	Draw	21–3–2 (3)	George Moore	PTS	6	Apr 16, 1904	19 years, 167 days	Wonderland, Mile End, London, England, U.K.	
28	Win	21–3–1 (3)	Andrew Dick Tokell	PTS	12	Mar 7, 1904	19 years, 127 days	Wonderland, Mile End, London, England, U.K.	
27	Win	20–3–1 (3)	Dave Morbin	PTS	6	Jan 30, 1904	19 years, 90 days	Wonderland, Mile End, London, England, U.K.	
26	ND	19–3–1 (3)	Tibby Watson	ND	3 (?)	Jan 19, 1904	19 years, 79 days	Albion Hall, Stockbridge, Hampshire, England, U.K.	
25	Draw	19–3–1 (2)	Aschel "Young" Joseph	PTS	12	Jan 18, 1904	19 years, 78 days	Wonderland, Mile End, London, England, U.K.	
24	ND	19–3 (2)	Tibby Watson	ND	3 (?)	Jan 16, 1904	19 years, 76 days	The Harriers, Edinburgh, Scotland, U.K.	An exhibition bout
23	Loss	19–3 (1)	Digger Stanley	PTS	15	Nov 9, 1903	19 years, 8 days	National Sporting Club, Covent Garden, London, England, U.K.	Lost NSC British flyweight title
22	Win	19–2 (1)	Jack Fitzpatrick	PTS	10	Sep 14, 1903	18 years, 317 days	Jem Mace's Gymnasium, Birmingham, West Midlands, England, U.K.	
21	Win	18–2 (1)	Bob Kendrick	KO	6 (6)	Jul 18, 1903	18 years, 259 days	Wonderland, Mile End, London, England, U.K.	
20	Win	17–2 (1)	Tibby Watson	PTS	4 (15)	Jun 26, 1903	18 years, 237 days	Birmingham, West Midlands, England, U.K.	
19	Win	16–2 (1)	Jack Walker	PTS	15	May 25, 1903	18 years, 205 days	National Sporting Club, Covent Garden, London, England, U.K.	Won vacant NSC British flyweight title
18	Win	15–2 (1)	Ernie Moody	KO	7 (10)	Mar 30, 1903	18 years, 149 days	National Sporting Club, Covent Garden, London, England, U.K.	
17	Win	14–2 (1)	Tom King	PTS	10	Feb 23, 1903	18 years, 114 days	Jem Mace's Gymnasium, Birmingham, West Midlands, England, U.K.	
16	Win	13–2 (1)	Jack Morris	KO	2 (20)	Dec 29, 1902	18 years, 58 days	Coronation Gymnasium, Liverpool, Merseyside, England, U.K.	Moran claimed English 110lbs title
15	Loss	12–2 (1)	Fred Herring	PTS	10	Dec 1, 1902	18 years, 30 days	National Sporting Club, Covent Garden, London, England, U.K.	
14	Win	12–1 (1)	Dave Job	PTS	8	Oct 31, 1902	17 years, 364 days	Birmingham, West Midlands, England, U.K.	
13	ND	11–1 (1)	Jim Glover	ND	4	Sep 22, 1902	17 years, 325 days	Pretoria Gymnasium, Birmingham, West Midlands, England, U.K.	No decision trial bout
12	Win	11–1	Johnny Hughes	DQ	5 (10)	Jun 30, 1902	17 years, 241 days	National Sporting Club, Covent Garden, London, England, U.K.	
11	Win	10–1	Jim Kenrick	PTS	10	May 12, 1902	17 years, 192 days	National Sporting Club, Covent Garden, London, England, U.K.	Won vacant NSC British light flyweight title
10	Win	9–1	Charlie Smirke	TKO	4 (10)	Feb 24, 1902	17 years, 115 days	National Sporting Club, Covent Garden, London, England, U.K.	
9	Win	8–1	Harry Root	PTS	10	Dec 14, 1901	17 years, 43 days	National Sporting Club, Covent Garden, London, England, U.K.	
8	Win	7–1	Harry Young Slough	PTS	15	Oct 9, 1901	16 years, 342 days	Mafeking Gym, Leicester, Leicestershire, U.K.	billed English 102lbs title
7	Loss	6–1	Digger Stanley	PTS	20	Jun 17, 1901	16 years, 228 days	Slaney Street Assembly Rooms, Birmingham, West Midlands, U.K.	
6	Win	6–0	Ernie Godwin	PTS	8	Mar 11, 1901	16 years, 130 days	Slaney Street Assembly Rooms, Birmingham, West Midlands, U.K.	
5	Win	5–0	Jack Moore	PTS	4	Feb 22, 1901	16 years, 113 days	Slaney Street Assembly Rooms, Birmingham, West Midlands, U.K.	
4	Win	4–0	Johnny Hughes	PTS	6	Feb 5, 1901	16 years, 96 days	Worcester City Boxing Club, Worcester, Worcestershire, U.K.	
3	Win	3–0	Tom Frogatt	KO	4 (6)	Feb 5, 1901	16 years, 96 days	Worcester City Boxing Club, Worcester, Worcestershire, U.K.	
2	Win	2–0	Tom Frogatt	KO	3 (8)	Dec 3, 1900	16 years, 32 days	Harry Cullis's Boxing Booth, Birmingham, West Midlands, U.K.	
1	Win	1–0	Bill Lovesey	KO	2 (8)	Nov 26, 1900	16 years, 25 days	Harry Cullis's Boxing Booth, Birmingham, West Midlands, U.K.	
