= Dick Corbett =

British boxer (1908–1943)

Personal information
- Born: Richard Coleman; 28 September 1908 Bethnal Green, London
- Died: 3 March 1943 (aged 34)
- Height: 5 ft 4 in (163 cm)
- Weight: Flyweight; Bantamweight; Featherweight

Boxing career
- Stance: Orthodox

Boxing record
- Total fights: 185
- Wins: 131
- Win by KO: 32
- Losses: 38
- Draws: 16
- No contests: 1

Richard Coleman (28 September 1908 – 3 March 1943), better known as Dick Corbett, was a two-time British bantamweight champion. He was from Bethnal Green, London.

== Boxing career ==
According to his traceable fight record Corbett remained undefeated between 1926 (the year of his pro debut) and 1927. His first defeat was at the hands of future British flyweight champion, Bert Kirby. Dick fought and beat Willie Smith while defending the Empire bantamweight title. Dick fought and beat Johnny King for the vacant British bantamweight title and the Commonwealth (British Empire) bantamweight title, and would fight Johnny King a further four times. In their second bout Corbett lost his British and Commonwealth bantamweight titles to King, but he regained both titles in their third meeting. Their fourth and fifth fights were both draws and so left Corbett the title holder. Corbett also won the British (Southern Area) Featherweight Title by defeating Dave Crowley.

== Personal life ==
Coleman was son of Henry and Elizabeth Coleman.

Coleman was one of 173 who died during the Bethnal Green Disaster during World War II, leaving a widow Lilian Rose. He was a younger brother of the British featherweight champion Harry Corbett.

== Championships and accomplishments ==
- British Boxing Board of Control
  - List of British bantamweight boxing champions (2 times)
  - British (Southern Area) Featherweight Title 1 time
  - Commonwealth (British Empire) bantamweight Title 1 time

== See also ==
- List of British bantamweight boxing champions
- British Boxing Board of Control
- National Sporting Club
