= Digger Stanley =

British boxer (1876–1919)

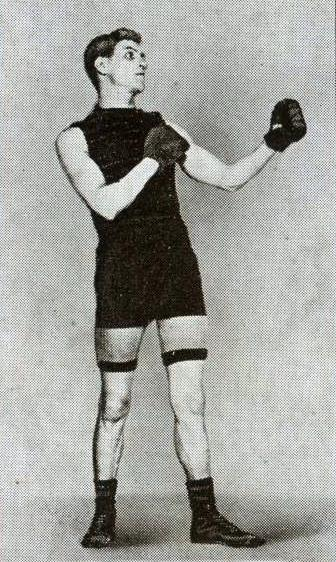

Personal information
- Nationality: British
- Born: George Stanley; 28 February 1876 Kingston-upon-Thames, England
- Died: 7 March 1919 (aged 43)
- Weight: Bantamweight

Boxing career

Boxing record
- Total fights: 86
- Wins: 56
- Losses: 21
- Draws: 7
- No contests: 2

George 'Digger' Stanley (28 February 1876 – 7 March 1919) was an English boxer who was British and European bantamweight boxing champion.

== Early life ==
Stanley was a gypsy, and was born in a caravan at Kingston-upon-Thames. He could not read or write, but developed into a clever boxer. His early boxing career was spent fighting in fairground booths.

== Professional career ==
He began boxing professionally in 1899. In November 1903 he won the vacant British bantamweight title and in December of the same year he won the British flyweight title, but the titles were not recognised by the British Boxing Board of Control until 1909.

In October 1910 he fought Joe Bowker for the British and European bantamweight titles. He scored an eighth-round knockout to secure the titles. Stanley was also recognised by the National Sporting Club as the holder of the World bantamweight title, although he was not recognised as such in America.

In December 1910 he defended his British title against Johnny Condon, winning on points. In September 1911 he defended it again, against Ike Bradley, again winning on points.

In April and June 1912, he defended his European title twice against the Frenchman, Charles Ledoux. He won the first fight in Covent Garden on points, but lost the second fight in Dieppe, being knocked out in the seventh round.

In October 1912, he successfully defended his British title against Alex Lafferty, winning on points.

In June 1913, he lost his British title to Bill Beynon, on points, but four months later he beat Benyon on points to regain it. However, in his next defence, in April 1914, he lost the British title to Curley Walker on a disqualification in the thirteenth.

He continued to box but had only ten more fights, losing eight of them and winning two.

He had his last fight in February 1919, losing to Mike Blake, and died a month later, in poverty.

== Lonsdale belt ==
In 1909, the National Sporting Club began awarding a Lonsdale Belt to the British champion at each weight. The belts were made from 22 carat gold and enamel. Digger Stanley was awarded the first bantamweight belt and was allowed to retain it after successfully defending his British title.

== Professional boxing record ==
115 fights	73 wins	21 losses
By knockout	18	1
By decision	55	11
By disqualification	0	9
Draws	8	
No contests	11	
Newspaper decisions/draws	2	

All newspaper decisions are officially regarded as “no decision” bouts and are not counted in the win/loss/draw column.

No.	Result	Record	Opponent	Type	Round	Date	Location	Notes
115	Loss	73–21–8 (13)	George Kilts	DQ	6 (20)	13 Jul 1918	St James Hall, Newcastle, Tyne and Wear, England	
114	Loss	73–20–8 (13)	George Kilts	DQ	9 (15)	22 Jun 1918	St James Hall, Newcastle, Tyne and Wear, England	
113	Loss	73–19–8 (13)	Walter Young Ross	DQ	6 (15)	22 Apr 1918	Hoxton Baths, Hoxton, London, England	
112	Win	73–18–8 (13)	Johnny Hughes	PTS	20	23 Mar 1918	The Ring, Blackfriars Road, Southwark, London, England	
111	Win	72–18–8 (13)	Bill Beynon	KO	5 (15)	25 Feb 1918	Queen's Hall, Cardiff, Wales	
110	Loss	71–18–8 (13)	Tommy Noble	PTS	20	18 Feb 1918	The Ring, Blackfriars Road, Southwark, London, England	
109	Loss	71–17–8 (13)	Walter Young Ross	PTS	15	28 Jan 1918	Pitfield Street Baths, Hoxton, London, England	
108	Win	71–16–8 (13)	Tommy Noble	PTS	20	23 Oct 1916	The Ring, Blackfriars Road, Southwark, London, England	
107	Loss	70–16–8 (13)	Joe Fox	DQ	10 (20)	9 Oct 1916	Central Baths, Bradford, Yorkshire, England	
106	Win	70–15–8 (13)	Sid Whatley	KO	3 (20)	18 Sep 1916	The Ring, Blackfriars Road, Southwark, London, England	
105	Loss	69–15–8 (13)	Young Joe Brooks	PTS	15	13 Mar 1916	Hoxton Baths, Hoxton, London, England	
104	Loss	69–14–8 (13)	Joe Symonds	DQ	13 (15)	17 Dec 1915	Cosmopolitan Gymnasium, Plymouth, Devon, England	
103	Loss	69–13–8 (13)	Tommy Harrison	DQ	4 (15)	11 Nov 1915	Liverpool Stadium, Pudsey Street, Liverpool, Merseyside, England	
102	Win	69–12–8 (13)	Joe Fox	PTS	15	16 Sep 1915	Liverpool Stadium, Pudsey Street, Liverpool, Merseyside, England	
101	Draw	68–12–8 (13)	Jimmy Barry	PTS	15	29 Mar 1915	National Sporting Club, Covent Garden, London, England	
100	Win	68–12–7 (13)	Pedlar Palmer	RTD	4 (10)	19 Nov 1914	West London Stadium, Church Street, Edgware Road, London, England	
99	Loss	67–12–7 (13)	Curley Walker	DQ	15 (20)	20 Apr 1914	National Sporting Club, Covent Garden, London, England	Lost Lonsdale British bantamweight title
98	Win	67–11–7 (13)	Bill Beynon	PTS	20	27 Oct 1913	National Sporting Club, Covent Garden, London, England	Won Lonsdale British bantamweight title
97	Loss	66–11–7 (13)	Bill Beynon	PTS	20	2 Jun 1913	National Sporting Club, Covent Garden, London, England	Lost Lonsdale British bantamweight title
96	Win	66–10–7 (13)	Alex Lafferty	PTS	20	21 Oct 1912	National Sporting Club, Covent Garden, London, England	Retained Lonsdale British bantamweight title
95	Win	65–10–7 (13)	Oswald Stapleton	KO	9 (10)	30 Aug 1912	Skating Rink, Chelmsford, Essex, England	
94	Loss	64–10–7 (13)	Charles Ledoux	KO	7 (20)	23 Jun 1912	Grand Hall des Magasins Généraux, Dieppe, Seine-Maritime, France	Lost IBU and world bantamweight titles
93	Win	64–9–7 (13)	Charles Ledoux	PTS	20	22 Apr 1912	National Sporting Club, Covent Garden, London, England	Retained IBU and world bantamweight titles
92	Loss	63–9–7 (13)	Jean Poesy	PTS	15	26 Feb 1912	National Sporting Club, Covent Garden, London, England	
91	Win	63–8–7 (13)	Oswald Stapleton	KO	6 (10)	11 Dec 1911	Drill Hall, Merthyr Tydfil, Wales	
90	Win	62–8–7 (13)	Ike Young Bradley	PTS	20	14 Sep 1911	Liverpool Stadium, Pudsey Street, Liverpool, Merseyside, England	Retained IBU and world bantamweight titles Won vacant BBBofC British bantamweight title
89	Draw	61–8–7 (13)	Tommy O'Toole	NWS	6	8 Feb 1911	American A.C., Philadelphia, Pennsylvania, U.S.	
88	Draw	61–8–7 (12)	Frankie Burns	NWS	10	27 Jan 1911	National Sporting Club, New York City, New York, U.S.	
87	Win	61–8–7 (11)	Johnny Condon	PTS	20	5 Dec 1910	The Ring, Blackfriars Road, Southwark, London, England	Retained IBU and world bantamweight titles
86	Win	60–8–7 (11)	Joe Bowker	KO	8 (20)	17 Oct 1910	National Sporting Club, Covent Garden, London, England	Won IBU, Lonsdale, and world bantamweight titles
85	Draw	59–8–7 (11)	Young Pierce	PTS	20	14 Feb 1910	National Sporting Club, Covent Garden, London, England	
84	Win	59–8–6 (11)	Dick Golding	KO	3 (10)	27 Dec 1909	The Queens Theatre, Poplar, London, England	
83	Win	58–8–6 (11)	Oswald Stapleton	KO	5 (6)	3 Nov 1909	The Athenaeum Club, Angel Court, Throgmorton Street, City of London, London, England	
82	Win	57–8–6 (11)	Alf Mitchell	PTS	6	14 Jun 1909	National Sporting Club, Covent Garden, London, England	
81	Draw	56–8–6 (11)	Jimmy Walsh	PTS	15	24 May 1909	National Sporting Club, Covent Garden, London, England	
80	Win	56–8–5 (11)	Bill Jordan	PTS	10	22 Mar 1909	National Sporting Club, Covent Garden, London, England	
79	Draw	55–8–5 (11)	Wally Morgan	PTS	6	19 Nov 1908	Cromwell Hall, Putney, London, England	
78	Win	55–8–4 (11)	Sam Kellar	PTS	20	19 Oct 1908	National Sporting Club, Covent Garden, London, England	
77	Win	54–8–4 (11)	Young Sullivan	PTS	6	4 Apr 1908	Wonderland, Whitechapel Road, Mile End, London, England	
76	Win	53–8–4 (11)	Ike Young Bradley	PTS	15	30 Mar 1908	Wonderland, Whitechapel Road, Mile End, London, England	
75	Win	52–8–4 (11)	Driver William Himphen	PTS	6	7 Mar 1908	Wonderland, Whitechapel Road, Mile End, London, England	
74	Win	51–8–4 (11)	Wally Morgan	PTS	6	22 Feb 1908	Wonderland, Whitechapel Road, Mile End, London, England	
73	Win	50–8–4 (11)	Wally Morgan	PTS	6	30 Nov 1907	Wonderland, Whitechapel Road, Mile End, London, England	
72	Win	49–8–4 (11)	Young Lilley	PTS	6	28 Nov 1907	Marlborough Lines Gymnasium, Aldershot, Hampshire, England	
71	Loss	48–8–4 (11)	Bob Kendrick	DQ	9 (20)	12 Sep 1907	Liverpool Gymnastic Club, Liverpool, Merseyside, England	
70	Loss	48–7–4 (11)	Al Delmont	DQ	12 (20)	6 Jun 1907	Liverpool Gymnastic Club, Liverpool, Merseyside, England	Lost World & English 112lbs bantamweight title claims Stanley disqualified for a low blow
69	Win	48–6–4 (11)	Ike Young Bradley	PTS	20	13 Dec 1906	Liverpool Gymnastic Club, Liverpool, Merseyside, England	Retained World & English 112lbs bantamweight title claims
68	Win	47–6–4 (11)	Harry Young Slough	KO	18 (20)	21 May 1906	Ginnetts Circus, Newcastle, Tyne and Wear, England	Retained English 112lbs title claim
67	Win	46–6–4 (11)	Billy Hughes	RTD	16 (20)	10 Feb 1906	Ginnetts Circus, Newcastle, Tyne and Wear, England	
66	Win	45–6–4 (11)	Ike Young Bradley	PTS	20	20 Jan 1906	Liverpool Gymnastic Club, Liverpool, Merseyside, England	Claimed disputed vacant world & English 112lbs bantamweight titles
65	Draw	44–6–4 (11)	Darkey Haley	PTS	6	18 Dec 1905	National Sporting Club, Covent Garden, London, England	
64	Loss	44–6–3 (11)	Jimmy Walsh	PTS	15	20 Oct 1905	Pythian Rink, Chelsea, Massachusetts, U.S.	For world bantamweight title claim
63	Loss	44–5–3 (11)	George Moore	PTS	6	1 Jul 1905	Wonderland, Whitechapel Road, Mile End, London, England	
62	Win	44–4–3 (11)	Darkey Haley	PTS	6	24 Jun 1905	Wonderland, Whitechapel Road, Mile End, London, England	
61	Win	43–4–3 (11)	Louis D'Or	RTD	7 (10)	17 Apr 1905	National Sporting Club, Covent Garden, London, England	
60	Win	42–4–3 (11)	Alf Smith	KO	4 (4)	25 Mar 1905	Hounslow Town Gymnasium, Hounslow, London, England	
59	Win	41–4–3 (11)	Lew Branson	KO	4 (6)	27 Feb 1905	Olympia, Kensington, London, England	
58	Loss	40–4–3 (11)	Owen Moran	PTS	20	23 Jan 1905	National Sporting Club, Covent Garden, London, England	Lost Lonsdale and Commonwealth bantamweight titles
57	NC	40–3–3 (11)	Jack Johnson	ND	4	16 Jan 1905	Temple of Varieties, Hounslow, London, England	No decision trial bout
56	Win	40–3–3 (10)	Syd Wilmott	KO	4 (20)	19 Nov 1904	Ginnetts Circus, Newcastle, Tyne and Wear, England	Won vacant Commonwealth bantamweight title
55	Win	39–3–3 (10)	Harry McDermott	KO	19 (20)	17 Oct 1904	Ginnetts Circus, Newcastle, Tyne and Wear, England	
54	Win	38–3–3 (10)	Harry McDermott	KO	6 (20)	11 Jul 1904	Ginnetts Circus, Newcastle, Tyne and Wear, England	
53	Draw	37–3–3 (10)	Jimmy Walsh	PTS	15	6 Jun 1904	National Sporting Club, Covent Garden, London, England	
52	Win	37–3–2 (10)	Jimmy Walsh	PTS	15	18 Apr 1904	National Sporting Club, Covent Garden, London, England	
51	NC	36–3–2 (10)	Alf Butler	ND	3	21 Dec 1903	Drill Hall, West Ealing, London, England	No decision trial bout
50	Win	36–3–2 (9)	Jack Walker	PTS	15	14 Dec 1903	National Sporting Club, Covent Garden, London, England	Retained Lonsdale flyweight title
49	Win	35–3–2 (9)	Owen Moran	PTS	15	9 Nov 1903	National Sporting Club, Covent Garden, London, England	Won Lonsdale British flyweight title
48	Win	34–3–2 (9)	George Dixon	PTS	6	12 Oct 1903	National Sporting Club, Covent Garden, London, England	
47	Loss	33–3–2 (9)	George Dixon	PTS	6	1 Aug 1903	Wonderland, Whitechapel Road, Mile End, London, England	
46	Win	33–2–2 (9)	Jim Williams	PTS	6	11 Jul 1903	Wonderland, Whitechapel Road, Mile End, London, England	
45	Loss	32–2–2 (9)	Pedlar Palmer	PTS	12	11 May 1903	Wonderland, Whitechapel Road, Mile End, London, England	
44	Win	32–1–2 (9)	Jack Guyon	PTS	10	28 Mar 1903	Wonderland, Whitechapel Road, Mile End, London, England	
43	Win	31–1–2 (9)	Jim Kenrick	PTS	6	14 Mar 1903	Wonderland, Whitechapel Road, Mile End, London, England	
42	Win	30–1–2 (9)	Jack Walker	PTS	12	2 Mar 1903	Wonderland, Whitechapel Road, Mile End, London, England	Billed World and English 110lbs titles
41	Win	29–1–2 (9)	Jack Guyon	PTS	6	21 Feb 1903	Wonderland, Whitechapel Road, Mile End, London, England	
40	Win	28–1–2 (9)	Jim Denhart	PTS	6	14 Feb 1903	Wonderland, Whitechapel Road, Mile End, London, England	
39	Draw	27–1–2 (9)	Jack Guyon	PTS	6	7 Feb 1903	Wonderland, Whitechapel Road, Mile End, London, England	
38	Win	27–1–1 (9)	Dave Morbin	PTS	6	17 Jan 1903	Wonderland, Whitechapel Road, Mile End, London, England	
37	Win	26–1–1 (9)	Tom Rippington	PTS	6	12 Jan 1903	Wonderland, Whitechapel Road, Mile End, London, England	
36	NC	25–1–1 (9)	Bob Garwood	ND	3	1 Dec 1902	National Sporting Club, Covent Garden, London, England	No decision trial bout
35	NC	25–1–1 (8)	Tom Bowker	ND	3	15 Nov 1902	National Sporting Club, Covent Garden, London, England	No decision trial bout
34	Win	25–1–1 (7)	Jack Guyon	PTS	10	10 Nov 1902	National Sporting Club, Covent Garden, London, England	
33	NC	24–1–1 (7)	Tom Bowker	ND	3	20 Oct 1902	National Sporting Club, Covent Garden, London, England	No decision trial bout
32	Win	24–1–1 (6)	Harry Young Slough	KO	5 (8)	13 Oct 1902	Fairground, Le Neves Booth, Leicester, Leicestershire, England	
31	NC	23–1–1 (6)	William King	ND	3	6 Oct 1902	National Sporting Club, Covent Garden, London, England	No decision trial bout
30	Win	23–1–1 (5)	Jack Fitzpatrick	PTS	6	22 Sep 1902	Tee to Tum Club, Stamford Hill, London, England	
29	Win	22–1–1 (5)	Tom King	PTS	6	20 Sep 1902	Wonderland, Whitechapel Road, Mile End, London, England	
28	Win	21–1–1 (5)	George Collins	PTS	6	13 Sep 1902	Wonderland, Whitechapel Road, Mile End, London, England	
27	Win	20–1–1 (5)	Tom King	PTS	6	6 Sep 1902	Wonderland, Whitechapel Road, Mile End, London, England	
26	Win	19–1–1 (5)	Cockney Cohen	PTS	6	30 Aug 1902	Wonderland, Whitechapel Road, Mile End, London, England	
25	Loss	18–1–1 (5)	Pedlar Palmer	PTS	10	16 Jun 1902	Wonderland, Whitechapel Road, Mile End, London, England	
24	Win	18–0–1 (5)	Jack Fitzpatrick	PTS	8	24 May 1902	Wonderland, Whitechapel Road, Mile End, London, England	
23	Win	17–0–1 (5)	Jack Fitzpatrick	PTS	6	17 May 1902	Wonderland, Whitechapel Road, Mile End, London, England	
22	Win	16–0–1 (5)	Dick Golding	PTS	10	12 May 1902	Wonderland, Whitechapel Road, Mile End, London, England	
21	Win	15–0–1 (5)	Tibby Watson	PTS	6	5 May 1902	Railway Arch Gym, Cambridge Road, Hammersmith, London, England	
20	Win	14–0–1 (5)	Jack Christian	PTS	6	3 May 1902	Wonderland, Whitechapel Road, Mile End, London, England	
19	Win	13–0–1 (5)	Tibby Watson	PTS	10	14 Apr 1902	Wonderland, Whitechapel Road, Mile End, London, England	
18	NC	12–0–1 (5)	Frank Connor	NC	3	10 Apr 1902	Hammersmith Gymnasium, Cambridge Road, Hammersmith, London, England	No decision bye bout
17	NC	12–0–1 (4)	Sid Clarke	NC	3	3 Apr 1902	Hammersmith Gymnasium, Cambridge Road, Hammersmith, London, England	No decision bye bout
16	Win	12–0–1 (3)	Jim Kenrick	PTS	6	29 Mar 1902	Wonderland, Whitechapel Road, Mile End, London, England	
15	Win	11–0–1 (3)	Tibby Watson	PTS	6	22 Mar 1902	Wonderland, Whitechapel Road, Mile End, London, England	
14	Win	10–0–1 (3)	Ginger Atkinson	PTS	6	15 Mar 1902	Wonderland, Whitechapel Road, Mile End, London, England	
13	Win	9–0–1 (3)	Jim Denhart	PTS	6	3 Mar 1902	Wonderland, Whitechapel Road, Mile End, London, England	
12	Win	8–0–1 (3)	George Dunny	PTS	10	17 Feb 1902	Wonderland, Whitechapel Road, Mile End, London, England	
11	Win	7–0–1 (3)	Jim Denhart	PTS	6	1 Feb 1902	Wonderland, Whitechapel Road, Mile End, London, England	
10	Draw	6–0–1 (3)	Frank Morcombe	PTS	12	23 Jan 1902	Wonderland, Whitechapel Road, Mile End, London, England	
9	NC	6–0 (3)	Jim Denhart	ND	4	18 Dec 1901	The Atheneum Theatre, Tottenham Court Road, London, England	No decision trial bout
8	NC	6–0 (2)	Jem Burden	ND	4	12 Dec 1901	The Crown Gym, Lille Road, Fulham, London, England	No decision trial bout
7	Win	6–0 (1)	Owen Moran	PTS	20	17 Jun 1901	Slaney Street Assembly Rooms, Birmingham, West Midlands, England	
6	Win	5–0 (1)	Jack Norman	PTS	6	1 Apr 1901	Wonderland, Whitechapel Road, Mile End, London, England	
5	Win	4–0 (1)	Charlie Ward	RTD	5 (10)	13 Dec 1899	The Crown Gym, Lille Road, Fulham, London, England	
4	NC	3–0 (1)	Frank Jenkins	ND	4	12 Dec 1899	Paddington Baths, Queen's Road, Bayswater, London, England	No decision trial bout
3	Win	3–0	J Newlands	PTS	4	10 Jul 1899	Lillie Hall, West Brompton, London, England	
2	Win	2–0	J Newlands	PTS	4	12 Jun 1899	Lillie Hall, West Brompton, London, England	
1	Win	1–0	Johnny Ford	PTS	10	25 Mar 1899	Beresford Street Drill Hall, Woolwich, London, England	

== See also ==
- List of British bantamweight boxing champions
