= Elky Clark =

Scottish boxer

Personal information
- Nickname: William Clark (alias)
- Nationality: Scottish
- Born: 4 January 1898 Bridgeton, Glasgow, Scotland
- Died: 22 September 1956 (aged 58) Glasgow, Scotland
- Height: 5 ft 3 in (1.60 m)
- Weight: Flyweight; Bantamweight

Boxing career
- Reach: 65 1/2 in (166 cm)

Boxing record
- Total fights: 47
- Wins: 30
- Win by KO: 20
- Losses: 12
- Draws: 5

Elky Clark (4 January 1898 – 22 September 1956) was a Scottish professional boxer who competed from 1921 to 1927. He held the British and inaugural Commonwealth flyweight titles from 1924 to 1926, the EBU European flyweight title from 1925 to 1926 and previously, the Scottish Area bantamweight title from 1923 to 1924.

== Career ==
Born in Bridgeton, Glasgow Clark made his professional debut in November 1921, losing to Alec Boyes.

In May 1923, he unsuccessfully challenged for the Scottish flyweight title against Willie Woods (later a Canada flyweight title challenger). He won the title in November that year, Harry McConnell retiring in the thirteenth round. He later also won the Scottish bantamweight title.

In March 1924 he faced Kid Kelly for the British flyweight title that became vacant when Jimmy Wilde retired; He stopped Kelly in the twentieth and final round to become British champion. In September that year he beat Jim Hanna to take the British Empire title.

In November 1924 he unsuccessfully challenged for Michel Montreuil's European title, but two months later beat the Belgian to become champion of Europe. Over the next two years he made four successful defences of the European title, against Young Johnny Brown, Antoine Merlo, Kid Socks (with the British and Empire titles also at stake), and Montreuil.

In January 1927 he challenged for The Ring world flyweight title against Fidel LaBarba at Madison Square Garden, losing a unanimous decision.

Clark received lengthy hospital treatment for an eye injury sustained in the LaBarba fight, and having failed to defend in time was stripped of the British title on 7 April. After being pronounced fit to resume fighting at the end of October, he was due to challenge Johnny Hill, who had won the British title while Clark was indisposed, but after his eye problems returned after sparring, he announced his retirement in November 1927.

Clark was a riveter by trade, and also played a dulcimer and accordion for a living. In the late 1930s and 1940s he was boxing correspondent for the Daily Record.

Clark died at his home in Glasgow on 22 September 1956 at the age of 58.
