= Bill Beynon =

Wales boxer (1891–1932)

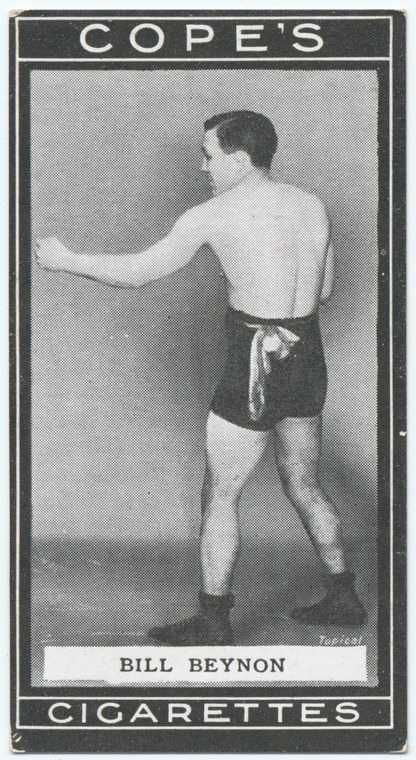

Personal information
- Nationality: Welsh
- Born: 8 April 1891 Taibach, Wales
- Died: 20 July 1932 (aged 41)
- Height: 5 ft 2 in (1.57 m)
- Weight: Bantamweight

Boxing career

Boxing record
- Total fights: 192
- Wins: 70
- Win by KO: 26
- Losses: 30
- Draws: 91
- No contests: 1

Bill Beynon (8 April 1891 – 20 July 1932) was a Welsh boxer who fought professionally between 1909 and 1931. He is most notable for winning the British and Empire bantamweight boxing championship in 1913.

== Boxing career ==
Beynon was a collier from the South Wales coalfield who supplemented his wages by taking up boxing while still a teenager. One of Beynon's first professional bouts was a loss against George Dando of Merthyr Tydfil, before Beynon entered one of the more successful phases of his career in the first three years as a professional fighter. On 2 June 1913, Beynon faced Digger Stanley at The Ring, in Blackfriars, London. Stanley was the reigning British and Empire bantamweight champion and was favourite to win the bout and retain his belt. Beynon won the fight by points over twenty rounds becoming the second officially recognised holder of the title.

Beynon's term as the bantam weight title holder was short lived, as after a win over Frenchman Robert Dastillon, he failed in his first defence of the belt, against Digger Stanley; losing in the same way as he won, by points over 20 rounds. Beynon's later career never reflected the success of his early career, losing the majority of his challenges. Beynon faced several notable fighters, included a win over past British flyweight champion Joe Symonds in 1921 and two knockout losses to Charles Ledoux, European bantamweight champion. When Beynon first faced Ledoux, it was for the European bantamweight championship title, and he lost the fight after being forced to retire in the eighth round after his eyebrow was split. The second challenge against Ledoux was far more clear cut, with the Frenchman outboxing Beynon at close-quarters, and won the contest by knockout in the eighth.

Beynon retired from the boxing ring at the age of 39. He died two years later in 1932 in a colliery accident.

== See also ==
- List of British bantamweight boxing champions
