= Tommy Harrison =

English boxer

- Rising Stars Boxing Card #11, 1922

Personal information
- Nationality: English
- Born: Thomas Harrison; 17 August 1892 Hanley, Stoke-on-Trent England
- Died: April→June 1931 (aged 38) Stoke-on-Trent district
- Weight: fly/bantam/featherweight

Boxing career

Boxing record
- Total fights: 78
- Wins: 49 (KO 24)
- Losses: 23 (KO 7)
- Draws: 6

Thomas Harrison (17 August 1892 – April→June 1931 (aged 38)) born in Hanley, Stoke-on-Trent was an English professional fly/bantam/featherweight boxer of the 1900s, 1910s and 1920s who won the National Sporting Club (NSC) (subsequently known as the British Boxing Board of Control (BBBofC)) British bantamweight title, British Empire bantamweight title, and European Boxing Union (EBU) bantamweight title, his professional fighting weight varied from 111 1/2 lb (50.6 kg; 7 st 13.5 lb), i.e. flyweight to 122 lb (55 kg; 8 st 10 lb), i.e. featherweight.
