= Sam Steward =

English boxer (1906–??)

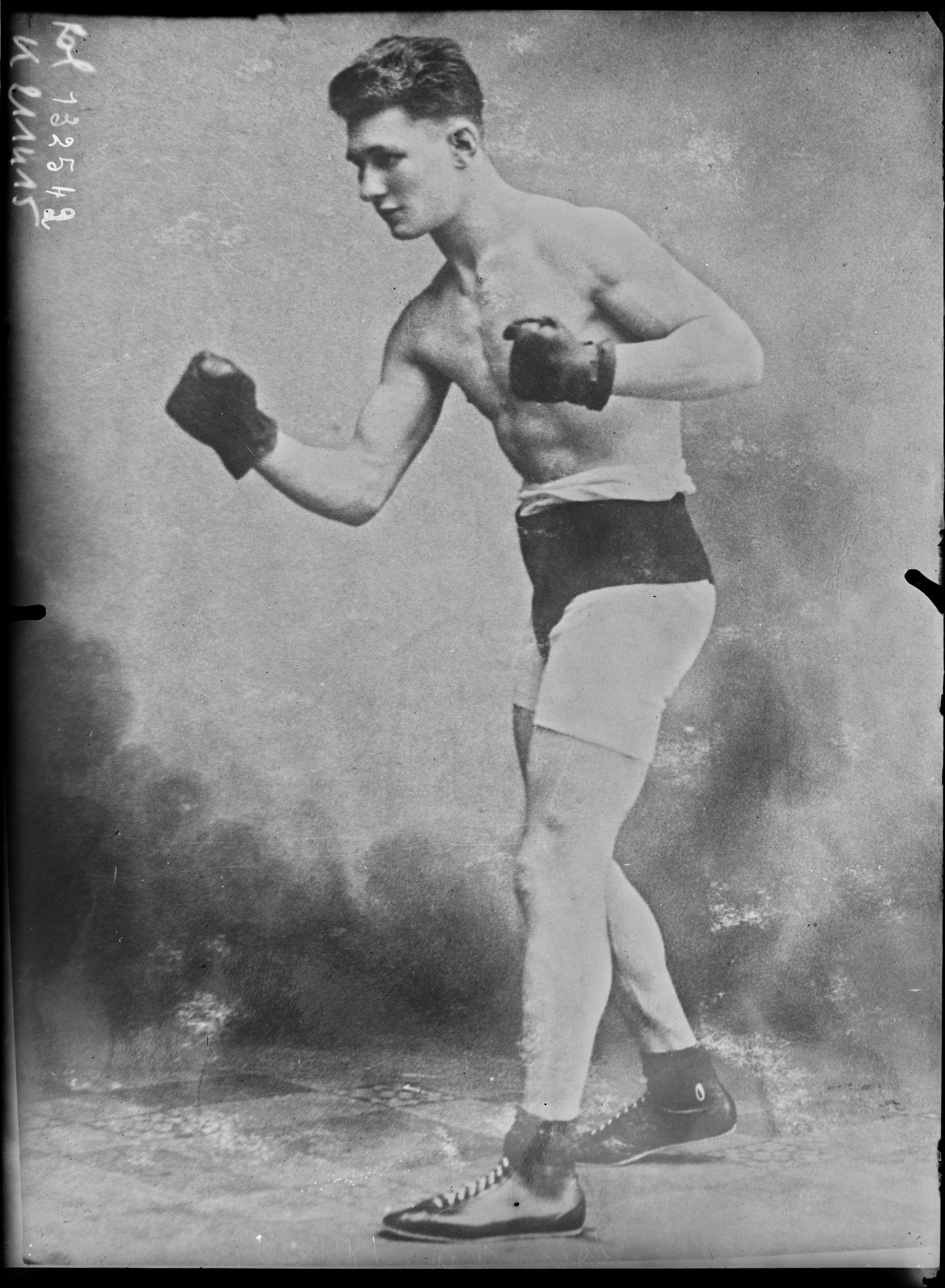

Personal information
- Nationality: British
- Born: Lewisham, London, England
- Weight: Lightweight

Boxing career

Boxing record
- Total fights: 126
- Wins: 86
- Win by KO: 12
- Losses: 19
- Draws: 21

Sam Steward (born 1906) was a British boxer who was British lightweight champion between 1928 and 1929.

== Career ==
Born in Lewisham, London, Sam Steward made his professional boxing debut in January 1922 with a decision over Rube Painter. After winning most of his first 24 fights he was stopped in the tenth round by Billy Bird in July 1924.

He had a significant win in December 1925 when he stopped former British featherweight champion Mike Honeyman in the seventh round. In March 1927 he beat lightweight champion of the Netherlands Battling van Dijk and later that year beat both Ernie Izzard and Jack Hyams.

He started 1928 with wins over George Rose, Auguste Gyde, and another defeat of Hyams in a title eliminator, before facing Ernie Rice in September for the British lightweight title vacated by Harry Mason, with Steward's Sporting Life belt also at stake. Steward knocked Rice out in the twelfth round to become British champion. He rounded off the year with a draw against former French champion Lucien Vinez and a win over future Dutch champion Jan Scheffers.

He started 1929 with two wins, including a points decision over Irish champion Billy Gilmore, but suffered a defeat at the end of January to former amateur champion Fred Webster in what was the latter's third professional fight. In May, Webster got a shot at Steward's British title at the Royal Albert Hall and again won on points to take the title in what was only his fifth pro fight.

Steward was undefeated during the next two years, which included two further wins over Gyde and a draw with Johnny Curley. A fight with Rose in 1930 was agreed as an eliminator for the British title but fell through after failure between their managers to agree on a venue, leading to the BBBofC no longer considering Steward an official title contender. In September 1931 he lost a decision to Dick Stubbings. The two met again two months later, the fight this time ending in a draw. Steward lost to Jack Hudson in December and was then out of the ring for almost four years before making a comeback in October 1935 against Bert Francis, retiring in the sixth round. He beat Billy Reynolds in January 1936 before losing his final fight in March that year to Fred Bullions.
