= Billy Bird =

English boxer (1899–1951)

Personal information
- Born: 1 January 1899 Chelsea, London, England
- Died: 6 February 1951 (aged 52)
- Weight: Welterweight

Boxing career

Boxing record
- Total fights: 356
- Wins: 260
- Win by KO: 139
- Losses: 73
- Draws: 20
- No contests: 3

Billy Bird (1 January 1899 – 6 February 1951) was a British professional boxer who was active from 1920 to 1948 and boxed in the welterweight division. He fought a recorded 356 times in his 28 year-career and was regarded as one of the most active boxers of his time. He holds the record of the most knockouts in any fighting career.

== Career ==
Bird has 356 recorded fights, but has been rumored to have even more fights during his career which were not professional matches. Bird currently holds the knockout world record at 138; the second closest is Archie Moore with 132 knockouts. Ian Palmer of Goliath listed Bird's achievement as "10 Boxing Records That Will (Probably) Never Be Broken". Robert Aaron Contreras of Bleacher Report believes this record will "never be repeated" as the current active boxer has a knockout record of 51.

On 30 September 1929 Bird won a fight against Leo Wax by decision after a 15-round bout.

Bird worked as a taxi driver when he was not boxing.

Bird died on 6 February 1951.

== Professional boxing record ==
356 fights	260 wins	73 losses
By knockout	139	22
By decision	114	44
By disqualification	7	7
Draws	20	
No contests	3	

No.	Result	Record	Opponent	Type	Round	Date	Age	Location
356	Win	260–73–20 (3)	Joe Fitzsimmons	PTS	4	Mar 19, 1948	49 years, 78 days	Queen Marys Hospital, Roehampton, London, England
355	Loss	259–73–20 (3)	Wal Dearing	PTS	8	Feb 11, 1943	44 years, 41 days	Lime Grove Baths, Shepherd's Bush, London, England
354	Win	259–72–20 (3)	Billy Hawkins	PTS	8	Feb 15, 1942	43 years, 45 days	Alexandra Theatre, Stoke Newington, London, England
353	Loss	258–72–20 (3)	Harry Watson	PTS	8	Dec 21, 1941	42 years, 354 days	Alexandra Theatre, Stoke Newington, London, England
352	Loss	258–71–20 (3)	Harry Watson	PTS	8	Dec 7, 1941	42 years, 340 days	Alexandra Theatre, Stoke Newington, London, England
351	Loss	258–70–20 (3)	Joe Marsh	PTS	6	Dec 1, 1941	42 years, 334 days	Seymour Hall Baths, Marylebone, London, England
350	Win	258–69–20 (3)	Alf Bishop	PTS	8	Sep 1, 1941	42 years, 243 days	Bath Pavilion, Bath, Somerset, England
349	Win	257–69–20 (3)	Ted Barter	PTS	10	Aug 4, 1941	42 years, 215 days	Rugby Ground, Bridgewater, Somerset, England
348	Win	256–69–20 (3)	Joe Kelt	PTS	10	Jul 9, 1941	42 years, 189 days	Vicarage Road (Watford FC), Watford, Hertfordshire, England
347	Loss	255–69–20 (3)	Arthur 'Ginger' Sadd	TKO	2 (10)	Jul 5, 1941	42 years, 185 days	Rugby Football Ground, Northampton, Northamptonshire, England
346	Draw	255–68–20 (3)	Johnny Blake	PTS	8	Aug 10, 1940	41 years, 222 days	Fulham Craven Cottage, Fulham, London, England
345	Win	255–68–19 (3)	Bert Francis	TKO	6 (12)	May 5, 1940	41 years, 125 days	Lyric Theatre, Hammersmith, London, England
344	Loss	254–68–19 (3)	George Odwell	KO	2 (10)	Apr 17, 1940	41 years, 107 days	Holborn Stadium Club, Holborn, London, England
343	Win	254–67–19 (3)	Bert Bevan	PTS	12	Apr 15, 1940	41 years, 105 days	Holborn Stadium Club, Holborn, London, England
342	Win	253–67–19 (3)	Tommy Enoch	PTS	10	Mar 7, 1940	41 years, 66 days	Devonshire Club, Hackney, London, England
341	Win	252–67–19 (3)	Sid Wicks	PTS	10	Feb 28, 1940	41 years, 58 days	Oddfellows Hall, Watford, Hertfordshire, England
340	Win	251–67–19 (3)	George Merritt	PTS	10	Jan 15, 1940	41 years, 14 days	Sportsdrome, Southampton, Hampshire, England
339	Loss	250–67–19 (3)	Tommy Jones	KO	3 (10)	Aug 14, 1939	40 years, 225 days	Millbay Rinkeries, Plymouth, Devon, England
338	Loss	250–66–19 (3)	Ted Barter	TKO	9 (12)	Jul 3, 1939	40 years, 183 days	Holborn Stadium Club, Holborn, London, England
337	Win	250–65–19 (3)	Jack Milburn	TKO	4 (12)	Jun 5, 1939	40 years, 155 days	Holborn Stadium Club, Holborn, London, England
336	Win	249–65–19 (3)	Boyo Pat Cassidy	TKO	7 (8)	Apr 16, 1939	40 years, 105 days	The Ring, Blackfriars Road, Southwark, London, England
335	Win	248–65–19 (3)	Stan Anderson	PTS	12	Apr 3, 1939	40 years, 92 days	Plumstead Baths, Plumstead, London, England
334	Loss	247–65–19 (3)	George Bunter	TKO	7 (8)	Mar 12, 1939	40 years, 70 days	The Ring, Blackfriars Road, Southwark, London, England
333	Win	247–64–19 (3)	Griff Lewis	DQ	9 (12)	Mar 6, 1939	40 years, 64 days	Plumstead Baths, Plumstead, London, England
332	Draw	246–64–19 (3)	Boyo Pat Cassidy	PTS	8	Feb 19, 1939	40 years, 49 days	The Ring, Blackfriars Road, Southwark, London, England
331	Win	246–64–18 (3)	Boyo Pat Cassidy	PTS	12	Feb 12, 1939	40 years, 42 days	Vale Hall, Kilburn, London, England
330	Win	245–64–18 (3)	Joe Kelt	TKO	7 (8)	Feb 5, 1939	40 years, 35 days	The Ring, Blackfriars Road, Southwark, London, England
329	Win	244–64–18 (3)	Butcher Clements	RTD	7 (8)	Jan 22, 1939	40 years, 21 days	The Ring, Blackfriars Road, Southwark, London, England
328	Win	243–64–18 (3)	Johnny Hughes	KO	3 (8)	Jan 8, 1939	40 years, 7 days	The Ring, Blackfriars Road, Southwark, London, England
327	Draw	242–64–18 (3)	Boyo Pat Cassidy	PTS	12	Nov 24, 1938	39 years, 327 days	Paddington Baths, Paddington, London, England
326	Loss	242–64–17 (3)	Johnny Blake	PTS	8	Oct 17, 1938	39 years, 289 days	NSC, Earls Court Empress Stadium, Kensington, London, England
325	Win	242–63–17 (3)	Fred Clements	RTD	7 (12)	Jul 1, 1938	39 years, 181 days	Alexandra Park, Ipswich, Suffolk, England
324	Win	241–63–17 (3)	Jim Greaves	PTS	10	Mar 28, 1938	39 years, 86 days	Drill Hall, Coventry, West Midlands, England
323	Win	240–63–17 (3)	Paddy Roche	RTD	7 (10)	Mar 20, 1938	39 years, 78 days	The Ring, Blackfriars Road, Southwark, London, England
322	Win	239–63–17 (3)	Ted Barter	TKO	7 (10)	Mar 14, 1938	39 years, 72 days	NSC, Earls Court Empress Stadium, Kensington, London, England
321	Win	238–63–17 (3)	Les Woodley	KO	7 (12)	Mar 6, 1938	39 years, 64 days	Hammersmith Stadium, Hammersmith, London, England
320	Win	237–63–17 (3)	Mick Miller	KO	5 (10)	Feb 28, 1938	39 years, 58 days	Paddington Baths, Paddington, London, England
319	Draw	236–63–17 (3)	Paddy Roche	PTS	8	Feb 21, 1938	39 years, 51 days	Earls Court Empress Hall, Kensington, London, England
318	Win	236–63–16 (3)	George Bunter	PTS	12	Feb 14, 1938	39 years, 44 days	Paddington Baths, Paddington, London, England
317	Win	235–63–16 (3)	Fred Clements	RTD	4 (8)	Feb 7, 1938	39 years, 37 days	Earls Court Empress Hall, Kensington, London, England
316	Loss	234–63–16 (3)	Fred Clements	DQ	5 (12)	Jan 23, 1938	39 years, 22 days	Hammersmith Stadium, Hammersmith, London, England
315	Win	234–62–16 (3)	Ted Barter	TKO	8 (12)	Jan 17, 1938	39 years, 16 days	Drill Hall, Walthamstow, London, England
314	Win	233–62–16 (3)	Dick Stubbings	PTS	12	Dec 19, 1937	38 years, 352 days	Hammersmith Stadium, Hammersmith, London, England
313	NC	232–62–16 (3)	Paddy Roche	NC	7 (10)	Nov 29, 1937	38 years, 332 days	Grand Pier Pavilion, Herne Bay, Kent, England
312	Win	232–62–16 (2)	Ben Smith	RTD	6 (12)	Nov 22, 1937	38 years, 325 days	Drill Hall, Walthamstow, London, England
311	Win	231–62–16 (2)	Jack Moody	PTS	12	Nov 17, 1937	38 years, 320 days	Westover Ice Rink, Bournemouth, Dorset, England
310	Win	230–62–16 (2)	Jack Milburn	PTS	12	Oct 25, 1937	38 years, 297 days	Drill Hall, Walthamstow, London, England
309	Win	229–62–16 (2)	Fred Clements	PTS	10	Oct 18, 1937	38 years, 290 days	Colston Hall, Bristol, Avon, England
308	Win	228–62–16 (2)	Len Wickwar	PTS	12	Jul 3, 1937	38 years, 183 days	Alexandra Park, Ipswich, Suffolk, England
307	Loss	227–62–16 (2)	George Davis	PTS	10	Jun 21, 1937	38 years, 171 days	Greyhound Stadium, Wandsworth, London, England
306	Win	227–61–16 (2)	Ted Barter	PTS	12	May 26, 1937	38 years, 145 days	Drill Hall, Gravesend, Kent, England
305	Win	226–61–16 (2)	Jack McKnight	PTS	12	May 5, 1937	38 years, 124 days	Westover Ice Rink, Bournemouth, Dorset, England
304	Win	225–61–16 (2)	Ted Barter	PTS	12	May 2, 1937	38 years, 121 days	The Ring, Blackfriars Road, Southwark, London, England
303	Win	224–61–16 (2)	Jim Greaves	PTS	12	Apr 26, 1937	38 years, 115 days	Drill Hall, Walthamstow, London, England
302	Win	223–61–16 (2)	Paddy Roche	PTS	12	Apr 11, 1937	38 years, 100 days	The Ring, Blackfriars Road, Southwark, London, England
301	Win	222–61–16 (2)	Fred Taylor	KO	1 (8)	Apr 5, 1937	38 years, 94 days	Earls Court Empress Hall, Kensington, London, England
300	Win	221–61–16 (2)	Pat Haley	PTS	12	Mar 31, 1937	38 years, 89 days	Westover Ice Rink, Bournemouth, Dorset, England
299	Win	220–61–16 (2)	Sid Ireland	RTD	8 (10)	Mar 22, 1937	38 years, 80 days	Drill Hall, Coventry, West Midlands, England
298	Win	219–61–16 (2)	Jack Ellis	PTS	12	Mar 1, 1937	38 years, 59 days	Drill Hall, Walthamstow, London, England
297	Loss	218–61–16 (2)	Jack Lewis	PTS	12	Feb 22, 1937	38 years, 52 days	Town Hall Baths, Edmonton, London, England
296	Win	218–60–16 (2)	Jack McKnight	PTS	12	Feb 7, 1937	38 years, 37 days	Hammersmith Stadium, Hammersmith, London, England
295	Loss	217–60–16 (2)	Sid Ireland	PTS	12	Feb 3, 1937	38 years, 33 days	Westover Ice Rink, Bournemouth, Dorset, England
294	Win	217–59–16 (2)	Jack Roberts	PTS	12	Feb 1, 1937	38 years, 31 days	Drill Hall, Walthamstow, London, England
293	Win	216–59–16 (2)	Ted Denner	KO	5 (12)	Jan 27, 1937	38 years, 26 days	Marine Gardens Pavilion, Folkestone, Kent, England
292	Win	215–59–16 (2)	Jack Lewis	PTS	12	Jan 25, 1937	38 years, 24 days	Town Hall Baths, Edmonton, London, England
291	Win	214–59–16 (2)	Haydn Williams	PTS	12	Jan 11, 1937	38 years, 10 days	Town Hall Baths, Edmonton, London, England
290	Win	213–59–16 (2)	Seaman Christie	TKO	8 (10)	Jan 7, 1937	38 years, 6 days	East Ham Baths, East Ham, London, England
289	Win	212–59–16 (2)	Herbie Spencer	TKO	6 (12)	Dec 13, 1936	37 years, 347 days	Hammersmith Stadium, Hammersmith, London, England
288	Win	211–59–16 (2)	Billy Gobel	RTD	6 (12)	Nov 29, 1936	37 years, 333 days	Hammersmith Stadium, Hammersmith, London, England
287	Win	210–59–16 (2)	Jack Lewis	PTS	12	May 18, 1936	37 years, 138 days	Deptford Arena, Deptford, London, England
286	Draw	209–59–16 (2)	Johnny Rust	PTS	12	Dec 30, 1935	36 years, 363 days	Mitcham Baths, Mitcham, London, England
285	Win	209–59–15 (2)	George Day	TKO	6 (12)	Oct 30, 1935	36 years, 302 days	Lime Grove Baths, Shepherd's Bush, London, England
284	Loss	208–59–15 (2)	Arthur 'Ginger' Sadd	PTS	12	Oct 21, 1935	36 years, 293 days	Hippodrome, Great Yarmouth, London, England
283	Loss	208–58–15 (2)	George Davis	PTS	12	Oct 16, 1935	36 years, 288 days	Lime Grove Baths, Shepherd's Bush, London, England
282	Win	208–57–15 (2)	Jack Lewis	PTS	12	Oct 7, 1935	36 years, 279 days	Hammersmith Stadium, Hammersmith, London, England
281	Loss	207–57–15 (2)	George Bunter	RTD	7 (10)	Jun 30, 1935	36 years, 180 days	The Arena, Mile End, London, England
280	Loss	207–56–15 (2)	George Purchase	PTS	15	May 20, 1935	36 years, 139 days	Greyfriars Hall, Cardiff, Wales
279	Loss	207–55–15 (2)	Arthur 'Ginger' Sadd	PTS	12	Apr 18, 1935	36 years, 107 days	Corn Hall, Norwich, Norfolk, England
278	Loss	207–54–15 (2)	Seaman Jim Lawlor	PTS	12	Apr 15, 1935	36 years, 104 days	Lime Grove Baths, Shepherd's Bush, London, England
277	Win	207–53–15 (2)	Seaman Jim Lawlor	PTS	12	Mar 28, 1935	36 years, 86 days	Corn Hall, Norwich, Norfolk, England
276	Loss	206–53–15 (2)	Dave McCleave	PTS	10	Mar 3, 1935	36 years, 61 days	The Ring, Blackfriars Road, Southwark, London, England
275	Win	206–52–15 (2)	Dixie Cullen	RTD	8 (10)	Feb 11, 1935	36 years, 41 days	Lime Grove Baths, Shepherd's Bush, London, England
274	Win	205–52–15 (2)	Clarence Barton	KO	7 (10)	Feb 4, 1935	36 years, 34 days	Embassy Rink, Sparbrook, West Midlands, England
273	Win	204–52–15 (2)	Albert O'Brien	KO	1 (10)	Jan 10, 1935	36 years, 9 days	Hammersmith Stadium, Hammersmith, London, England
272	Loss	203–52–15 (2)	Paul Schaeffer	KO	3 (10)	Dec 16, 1934	35 years, 349 days	Pavilion Theatre Arena, Whitechapel, London, England
271	Loss	203–51–15 (2)	Johnny Quill	PTS	12	Dec 3, 1934	35 years, 336 days	Holborn Stadium Club, Holborn, London, England
270	Win	203–50–15 (2)	Jack Moody	TKO	4 (8)	Nov 19, 1934	35 years, 322 days	Winter Gardens, Cheltenham, Gloucestershire, England
269	Win	202–50–15 (2)	Dollar Smith	TKO	9 (12)	Nov 5, 1934	35 years, 308 days	Lime Grove Baths, Shepherd's Bush, London, England
268	Draw	201–50–15 (2)	Chuck Parker	PTS	10	Oct 22, 1934	35 years, 294 days	Holborn Stadium Club, Holborn, Northamptonshire, England
267	Draw	201–50–14 (2)	Johnny Quill	PTS	12	Oct 16, 1934	35 years, 288 days	Holborn Stadium Club, Holborn, London, England
266	Win	201–50–13 (2)	Tab Davies	RTD	5 (10)	Sep 12, 1934	35 years, 254 days	St. Georges Hall, St Peter Port, Guernsey, Channel Islands
265	Draw	200–50–13 (2)	Chris Dawson	PTS	8	Sep 5, 1934	35 years, 247 days	Greyhound Stadium, Wandsworth, London, England
264	Loss	200–50–12 (2)	Charlie Baxter	PTS	10	Aug 30, 1934	35 years, 241 days	Wimbledon Stadium, Wimbledon, London, England
263	Win	200–49–12 (2)	Alf Bowden	KO	5 (12)	Aug 9, 1934	35 years, 220 days	Drill Hall, Bethnal Green, London, England
262	Win	199–49–12 (2)	Alf Newbiggin	PTS	6	Aug 8, 1934	35 years, 219 days	Greyhound Stadium, Wandsworth, London, England
261	Win	198–49–12 (2)	Seaman Harry Ewin	KO	2 (8)	Jul 11, 1934	35 years, 191 days	Greyhound Stadium, Wandsworth, London, England
260	Win	197–49–12 (2)	Billy Barr	PTS	12	May 19, 1934	35 years, 138 days	Kenilworth Road (Luton Town FC), Luton, Bedfordshire, England
259	Win	196–49–12 (2)	Fred Bloomfield	PTS	12	May 13, 1934	35 years, 132 days	Vale Hall, Kilburn, London, England
258	Loss	195–49–12 (2)	Seaman Joe Wakeling	PTS	10	May 6, 1934	35 years, 125 days	The Ring, Blackfriars Road, Southwark, London, England
257	Win	195–48–12 (2)	Ivor Pickens	TKO	9 (12)	Apr 27, 1934	35 years, 116 days	Colston Hall, Bristol, Gloucestershire, England
256	Win	194–48–12 (2)	Ernie Roderick	DQ	9 (12)	Apr 8, 1934	35 years, 97 days	The Ring, Blackfriars Road, Southwark, London, England
255	Win	193–48–12 (2)	George Purchase	PTS	8	Mar 19, 1934	35 years, 77 days	Royal Albert Hall, Kensington, London, England
254	Win	192–48–12 (2)	Les Ward	TKO	10 (12)	Jan 31, 1934	35 years, 30 days	Baths Hall, Ipswich, Suffolk, England
253	Win	191–48–12 (2)	Fred Oldfield	RTD	10 (15)	Jan 29, 1934	35 years, 28 days	Paddington Baths, Paddington, London, England
252	Win	190–48–12 (2)	Jack Delaney	PTS	10	Jan 22, 1934	35 years, 21 days	Lime Grove Baths, Shepherd's Bush, London, England
251	Win	189–48–12 (2)	Billy Barr	PTS	15	Dec 14, 1933	34 years, 347 days	Central Baths, East Ham, London, England
250	Win	188–48–12 (2)	Dai Beynon	TKO	6 (12)	Dec 13, 1933	34 years, 346 days	Baths Hall, Ipswich, Suffolk, England
249	Win	187–48–12 (2)	Fred Bloomfield	PTS	15	Nov 27, 1933	34 years, 330 days	Paddington Baths, Paddington, London, England
248	Win	186–48–12 (2)	Tom Curran	PTS	12	Oct 29, 1933	34 years, 301 days	Chalton Ring, Euston, London, England
247	Win	185–48–12 (2)	Arthur Unwin	RTD	7 (10)	Oct 26, 1933	34 years, 298 days	Drill Hall, Bethnal Green, London, England
246	Win	184–48–12 (2)	Pat Haley	TKO	9 (12)	Oct 16, 1933	34 years, 288 days	Alcazar, Edmonton, London, England
245	Win	183–48–12 (2)	Jack Collins	TKO	3 (10)	Oct 2, 1933	34 years, 274 days	Alcazar, Edmonton, London, England
244	Win	182–48–12 (2)	Herbie Fraser	TKO	9 (10)	Jul 1, 1933	34 years, 181 days	Loftus Road Stadium, Shepherd's Bush, London, England
243	Loss	181–48–12 (2)	Harry Mason	PTS	15	Apr 30, 1933	34 years, 119 days	The Arena, Mile End, London, England
242	Win	181–47–12 (2)	Moe Moss	PTS	8	Apr 27, 1933	34 years, 116 days	Royal Albert Hall, Kensington, London, England
241	Win	180–47–12 (2)	Wal Disney	PTS	15	Mar 13, 1933	34 years, 71 days	Paddington Baths, Paddington, London, England
240	Loss	179–47–12 (2)	Wal Disney	PTS	15	Feb 20, 1933	34 years, 50 days	Alcazar, Edmonton, London, England
239	Win	179–46–12 (2)	Fred Smith	PTS	15	Feb 16, 1933	34 years, 46 days	East Ham Baths, East Ham, London, England
238	Win	178–46–12 (2)	Willie Duncan	KO	6 (12)	Dec 13, 1932	33 years, 347 days	Stokewood Road Baths, Bournemouth, Dorset, England
237	Loss	177–46–12 (2)	Fred Webster	PTS	15	Dec 11, 1932	33 years, 345 days	The Ring, Blackfriars Road, Southwark, London, England
236	Win	177–45–12 (2)	Seaman Knocker White	PTS	15	Dec 1, 1932	33 years, 335 days	East Ham Baths, East Ham, London, England
235	Loss	176–45–12 (2)	Fred Webster	PTS	15	Nov 14, 1932	33 years, 318 days	Paddington Baths, Paddington, London, England
234	Loss	176–44–12 (2)	Jack Forster	RTD	7 (12)	Nov 10, 1932	33 years, 314 days	Corn Hall, Norwich, Norfolk, England
233	Win	176–43–12 (2)	Bert Tubbs	RTD	8 (12)	Nov 4, 1932	33 years, 308 days	Grand Theatre, Plymouth, Devon, England
232	Win	175–43–12 (2)	Jack Lewis	KO	2 (15)	Oct 27, 1932	33 years, 300 days	Stokewood Road Baths, Bournemouth, Dorset, England
231	Win	174–43–12 (2)	Fred Turpin	RTD	10 (15)	Oct 6, 1932	33 years, 279 days	Ilford Skating Rink, Ilford, Essex, England
230	Win	173–43–12 (2)	Alf Newbiggin	RTD	5 (15)	Sep 26, 1932	33 years, 269 days	Holborn Stadium Club, Holborn, London, England
229	Win	172–43–12 (2)	Willie Duncan	TKO	9 (15)	Sep 15, 1932	33 years, 258 days	Ilford Skating Rink, Ilford, Essex, England
228	Win	171–43–12 (2)	Mick Gavin	RTD	4 (12)	Aug 18, 1932	33 years, 230 days	Alexandra Palace, Wood Green, London, England
227	Loss	170–43–12 (2)	Jack Lord	PTS	15	Jun 20, 1932	33 years, 171 days	Alcazar, Edmonton, London, England
226	Win	170–42–12 (2)	Arthur Unwin	KO	1 (6)	May 30, 1932	33 years, 150 days	White City Stadium, White City, London, England
225	Loss	169–42–12 (2)	Del Fontaine	KO	3 (15)	May 23, 1932	33 years, 143 days	The Ring, Blackfriars Road, Southwark, London, England
224	Win	169–41–12 (2)	Ashton Jones	TKO	11 (15)	May 1, 1932	33 years, 121 days	The Ring, Blackfriars Road, Southwark, London, England
223	Loss	168–41–12 (2)	Harry Mason	PTS	15	Apr 18, 1932	33 years, 108 days	The Ring, Blackfriars Road, Southwark, London, England
222	Draw	168–40–12 (2)	Hans Holdt	PTS	8	Apr 8, 1932	33 years, 98 days	Forum, Copenhagen, Denmark
221	Win	168–40–11 (2)	Albert Johnson	KO	4 (12)	Mar 23, 1932	33 years, 82 days	Baths Hall, Ipswich, Suffolk, England
220	Win	167–40–11 (2)	George Newton	RTD	7 (12)	Mar 17, 1932	33 years, 76 days	Corn Hall, Norwich, Norfolk, England
219	Win	166–40–11 (2)	Seaman Fraggott	RTD	6 (15)	Mar 13, 1932	33 years, 72 days	The Ring, Blackfriars Road, Southwark, London, England
218	Win	165–40–11 (2)	George Spiers	PTS	15	Mar 7, 1932	33 years, 66 days	Alcazar, Edmonton, London, England
217	Win	164–40–11 (2)	Jack Forster	PTS	10	Mar 3, 1932	33 years, 62 days	Corn Hall, Norwich, Norfolk, England
216	Win	163–40–11 (2)	Teddy Boyd	RTD	6 (15)	Feb 22, 1932	33 years, 52 days	Lime Grove Baths, Shepherd's Bush, London, England
215	Win	162–40–11 (2)	Ashton Jones	PTS	15	Feb 15, 1932	33 years, 45 days	Alcazar, Edmonton, London, England
214	Loss	161–40–11 (2)	Fred Webster	PTS	15	Feb 3, 1932	33 years, 33 days	Paddington Baths, Paddington, London, England
213	Win	161–39–11 (2)	Rene Evans	PTS	15	Dec 14, 1931	32 years, 347 days	Alcazar, Edmonton, London, England
212	Loss	160–39–11 (2)	Leen Sanders	PTS	10	Nov 30, 1931	32 years, 333 days	Gebouw van K&W, Rotterdam, Netherlands
211	Win	160–38–11 (2)	Teddy Welsh	PTS	15	Nov 16, 1931	32 years, 319 days	Alcazar, Edmonton, London, England
210	Win	159–38–11 (2)	Ernie Clancy	RTD	4 (15)	Oct 30, 1931	32 years, 302 days	Drill Hall, Bloomsbury, London, England
209	Loss	158–38–11 (2)	František Nekolný	TKO	5 (10)	Sep 1, 1931	32 years, 243 days	Arena Sparta, Prague, Czechoslovakia
208	Loss	158–37–11 (2)	Camille Desmedt	PTS	10	Jul 30, 1931	32 years, 210 days	Théâtre des Variétés, Charleroi, Hainaut, Belgium
207	Loss	158–36–11 (2)	George Rose	TKO	5 (15)	Jul 18, 1931	32 years, 198 days	North Devon Greyhound Stadium, Barnstaple, Devon, England
206	Win	158–35–11 (2)	Arthur Unwin	RTD	3 (15)	May 3, 1931	32 years, 122 days	Vale Hall, Kilburn, London, England
205	Win	157–35–11 (2)	Alf Mancini	TKO	6 (10)	Apr 22, 1931	32 years, 111 days	Royal Albert Hall, Kensington, London, England
204	Loss	156–35–11 (2)	George Rose	PTS	15	Mar 29, 1931	32 years, 87 days	Vale Hall, Kilburn, London, England
203	Win	156–34–11 (2)	Alec Thake	RTD	14 (15)	Mar 15, 1931	32 years, 73 days	Vale Hall, Kilburn, London, England
202	Win	155–34–11 (2)	Bill Webster	TKO	2 (15)	Feb 22, 1931	32 years, 52 days	Vale Hall, Kilburn, London, England
201	Draw	154–34–11 (2)	Bill Webster	PTS	15	Feb 8, 1931	32 years, 38 days	Vale Hall, Kilburn, London, England
200	Loss	154–34–10 (2)	George Rose	PTS	15	Jan 19, 1931	32 years, 18 days	Alcazar, Edmonton, London, England
199	Win	154–33–10 (2)	Phil Green	PTS	15	Jan 5, 1931	32 years, 4 days	Alcazar, Edmonton, London, England
198	Draw	153–33–10 (2)	Camille Desmedt	PTS	15	Oct 27, 1930	31 years, 299 days	Lime Grove Baths, Shepherd's Bush, London, England
197	Loss	153–33–9 (2)	Haydn Williams	PTS	15	Jul 27, 1930	31 years, 207 days	Alcazar, Edmonton, London, England
196	Win	153–32–9 (2)	Alec Thake	PTS	15	May 26, 1930	31 years, 145 days	The Ring, Blackfriars Road, Southwark, London, England
195	Win	152–32–9 (2)	Arthur Rees	KO	10 (15)	Apr 28, 1930	31 years, 117 days	The Ring, Blackfriars Road, Southwark, London, England
194	Win	151–32–9 (2)	Ocky Davies	TKO	12 (15)	Mar 31, 1930	31 years, 89 days	The Ring, Blackfriars Road, Southwark, London, England
193	Win	150–32–9 (2)	Harry Jennings	RTD	6 (15)	Mar 23, 1930	31 years, 81 days	Vale Hall, Kilburn, London, England
192	Win	149–32–9 (2)	Jack Griffiths	KO	9 (15)	Feb 24, 1930	31 years, 54 days	The Ring, Blackfriars Road, Southwark, London, England
191	Win	148–32–9 (2)	Alec Thake	RTD	12 (15)	Jan 26, 1930	31 years, 25 days	Vale Hall, Kilburn, London, England
190	Win	147–32–9 (2)	Ivor Davies	TKO	10 (15)	Jan 13, 1930	31 years, 12 days	The Ring, Blackfriars Road, Southwark, London, England
189	Win	146–32–9 (2)	Joe Ralph	DQ	5 (15)	Dec 16, 1929	30 years, 349 days	The Ring, Blackfriars Road, Southwark, London, England
188	Win	145–32–9 (2)	Tommy O'Neill	RTD	3 (15)	Nov 27, 1929	30 years, 330 days	Lime Grove Baths, Shepherd's Bush, London, England
187	Win	144–32–9 (2)	Henri Mouha	RTD	10 (15)	Nov 18, 1929	30 years, 321 days	The Ring, Blackfriars Road, Southwark, London, England
186	Win	143–32–9 (2)	Chris Gorman	TKO	5 (15)	Nov 4, 1929	30 years, 307 days	The Ring, Blackfriars Road, Southwark, London, England
185	Win	142–32–9 (2)	Leo Wax	PTS	15	Sep 30, 1929	30 years, 272 days	The Ring, Blackfriars Road, Southwark, London, England
184	Win	141–32–9 (2)	Harry Benton	RTD	8 (12)	Sep 2, 1929	30 years, 244 days	The Ring, Blackfriars Road, Southwark, London, England
183	Loss	140–32–9 (2)	Archie Sexton	TKO	7 (8)	Jun 21, 1929	30 years, 171 days	Clapton Stadium, Clapton, London, England
182	Win	140–31–9 (2)	Billy Green	TKO	4 (15)	May 13, 1929	30 years, 132 days	The Ring, Blackfriars Road, Southwark, London, England
181	Win	139–31–9 (2)	Carlo Galbusera	DQ	8 (15)	Apr 15, 1929	30 years, 104 days	The Ring, Blackfriars Road, Southwark, London, England
180	Win	138–31–9 (2)	Jack Haynes	RTD	10 (15)	Mar 18, 1929	30 years, 76 days	The Ring, Blackfriars Road, Southwark, London, England
179	Win	137–31–9 (2)	Jack Haynes	PTS	6	Feb 21, 1929	30 years, 51 days	Selhurst Park Football Ground, Crystal Palace, London, England
178	Win	136–31–9 (2)	Joe Ralph	PTS	15	Jan 28, 1929	30 years, 27 days	The Ring, Blackfriars Road, Southwark, London, England
177	Loss	135–31–9 (2)	Mario Bosisio	PTS	10	Jan 6, 1929	30 years, 5 days	Milan, Italy
176	Win	135–30–9 (2)	Harry Lem	PTS	15	Nov 6, 1928	29 years, 310 days	Fulham Baths, Fulham, London, England
175	Win	134–30–9 (2)	Eugene Henderson	RTD	7 (15)	Nov 4, 1928	29 years, 308 days	The Ring, Blackfriars Road, Southwark, London, England
174	Draw	133–30–9 (2)	Roy Martin	PTS	15	Sep 30, 1928	29 years, 273 days	The Ring, Blackfriars Road, Southwark, London, England
173	Loss	133–30–8 (2)	Joe Ralph	UD	10	Sep 11, 1928	29 years, 254 days	Rubenspaleis, Antwerpen, Belgium
172	Loss	133–29–8 (2)	Ralph Rudd	PTS	6	Sep 9, 1928	29 years, 252 days	The Ring, Blackfriars Road, Southwark, London, England
171	Loss	133–28–8 (2)	Roy Martin	PTS	15	Aug 26, 1928	29 years, 238 days	The Ring, Blackfriars Road, Southwark, London, England
170	Win	133–27–8 (2)	Hans Holdt	RTD	8 (15)	Jul 2, 1928	29 years, 183 days	The Ring, Blackfriars Road, Southwark, London, England
169	Win	132–27–8 (2)	Otto Lauer	RTD	11 (15)	Jun 11, 1928	29 years, 162 days	The Ring, Blackfriars Road, Southwark, London, England
168	Win	131–27–8 (2)	Louis Kessler	PTS	15	May 7, 1928	29 years, 127 days	The Ring, Blackfriars Road, Southwark, London, England
167	Win	130–27–8 (2)	Huib Huizenaar	KO	6 (15)	Apr 16, 1928	29 years, 106 days	The Ring, Blackfriars Road, Southwark, London, England
166	Win	129–27–8 (2)	Dixie Brown	PTS	15	Apr 1, 1928	29 years, 91 days	The Ring, Blackfriars Road, Southwark, London, England
165	Loss	128–27–8 (2)	Harry Mason	PTS	15	Mar 4, 1928	29 years, 63 days	Premierland, Whitechapel, London, England
164	Win	128–26–8 (2)	Camille Desmedt	PTS	15	Feb 19, 1928	29 years, 49 days	The Ring, Blackfriars Road, Southwark, London, England
163	Win	127–26–8 (2)	Billy Thomas	TKO	4 (15)	Jan 29, 1928	29 years, 28 days	The Ring, Blackfriars Road, Southwark, London, England
162	Loss	126–26–8 (2)	Alf Mancini	TKO	1 (15)	Jan 2, 1928	29 years, 1 day	The Ring, Blackfriars Road, Southwark, London, England
161	Win	126–25–8 (2)	Alfred Genon	KO	12 (15)	Dec 4, 1927	28 years, 337 days	The Ring, Blackfriars Road, Southwark, London, England
160	Win	125–25–8 (2)	Alf Ros	PTS	15	Nov 20, 1927	28 years, 323 days	The Ring, Blackfriars Road, Southwark, London, England
159	Win	124–25–8 (2)	Leo Darton	PTS	15	Oct 30, 1927	28 years, 302 days	The Ring, Blackfriars Road, Southwark, London, England
158	Win	123–25–8 (2)	Frankie Paul	TKO	12 (15)	Oct 13, 1927	28 years, 285 days	The Ring, Blackfriars Road, Southwark, London, England
157	Loss	122–25–8 (2)	Frank Baldwin	DQ	13 (15)	Oct 2, 1927	28 years, 274 days	Manor Hall, Hackney, London, England
156	Win	122–24–8 (2)	Sid Breeze	TKO	8 (15)	Sep 18, 1927	28 years, 260 days	Manor Hall, Hackney, London, England
155	Win	121–24–8 (2)	Harry Lem	RTD	7 (15)	Sep 5, 1927	28 years, 247 days	The Ring, Blackfriars Road, Southwark, London, England
154	Win	120–24–8 (2)	Jack Griffiths	RTD	5 (15)	Aug 14, 1927	28 years, 225 days	The Ring, Blackfriars Road, Southwark, London, England
153	Win	119–24–8 (2)	Hans Rieke	RTD	11 (15)	Aug 11, 1927	28 years, 222 days	Ilford Skating Rink, Ilford, Essex, England
152	Loss	118–24–8 (2)	Jean Gavalda	PTS	15	Jun 13, 1927	28 years, 163 days	Alcazar, Edmonton, London, England
151	Win	118–23–8 (2)	Louis Kessler	PTS	15	Mar 21, 1927	28 years, 79 days	Alcazar, Edmonton, London, England
150	Win	117–23–8 (2)	Laurie Guard	TKO	5 (15)	Mar 11, 1927	28 years, 69 days	Fulham Baths, Fulham, London, England
149	Win	116–23–8 (2)	George Pomphrey	KO	2 (15)	Feb 27, 1927	28 years, 57 days	Manor Hall, Hackney, London, England
148	Win	115–23–8 (2)	Louis Kessler	PTS	15	Feb 21, 1927	28 years, 51 days	Alcazar, Edmonton, London, England
147	Win	114–23–8 (2)	Fred Smith	RTD	3 (15)	Feb 7, 1927	28 years, 37 days	Johnson & Phillips Sports Club, Greenwich, London, England
146	NC	113–23–8 (2)	Frankie Brown	NC	12 (15)	Jan 17, 1927	28 years, 16 days	National Sporting Club, Covent Garden, London, England
145	Win	113–23–8 (1)	Raymond Porcher	RTD	12 (15)	Jan 6, 1927	28 years, 5 days	The Ring, Blackfriars Road, Southwark, London, England
144	Win	112–23–8 (1)	Teddy Morrison	TKO	6 (15)	Dec 26, 1926	27 years, 359 days	The Ring, Blackfriars Road, Southwark, London, England
143	Win	111–23–8 (1)	Leo Darton	PTS	15	Dec 13, 1926	27 years, 346 days	National Sporting Club, Covent Garden, London, England
142	Win	110–23–8 (1)	Albert Johnson	KO	11 (15)	Dec 6, 1926	27 years, 339 days	Alcazar, Edmonton, London, England
141	Win	109–23–8 (1)	Andre Germain	RTD	11 (15)	Nov 25, 1926	27 years, 328 days	The Ring, Blackfriars Road, Southwark, England
140	Loss	108–23–8 (1)	Tom Thomas	DQ	10 (15)	Nov 18, 1926	27 years, 321 days	St. Helier Stadium, St Helier, Jersey, Channel Islands
139	Win	108–22–8 (1)	Teddy Morrison	PTS	15	Oct 28, 1926	27 years, 300 days	The Ring, Blackfriars Road, Southwark, London, England
138	Win	107–22–8 (1)	Guardsman Lewis	KO	3 (15)	Oct 26, 1926	27 years, 298 days	Alcazar, Edmonton, London, England
137	Win	106–22–8 (1)	Raymond Porcher	PTS	15	Oct 11, 1926	27 years, 283 days	Alcazar, Edmonton, London, England
136	Win	105–22–8 (1)	Ted Marchant	DQ	10 (15)	Sep 23, 1926	27 years, 265 days	The Ring, Blackfriars Road, Southwark, London, England
135	Win	104–22–8 (1)	Jack Josephs	RTD	4 (15)	Sep 13, 1926	27 years, 255 days	Alcazar, Edmonton, London, England
134	Loss	103–22–8 (1)	Seaman Hardy	DQ	8 (15)	Aug 30, 1926	27 years, 241 days	Alcazar, Edmonton, London, England
133	Win	103–21–8 (1)	Francois Rabosee	PTS	15	Aug 16, 1926	27 years, 227 days	Alcazar, Edmonton, London, England
132	Win	102–21–8 (1)	Laurie Raiteri	RTD	11 (15)	Jul 26, 1926	27 years, 206 days	Alcazar, Edmonton, London, England
131	Win	101–21–8 (1)	Laurie Raiteri	PTS	15	Jul 5, 1926	27 years, 185 days	Alcazar, Edmonton, London, England
130	Win	100–21–8 (1)	Frankie Brown	PTS	12	Jun 14, 1926	27 years, 164 days	Holland Park Rink, Kensington, London, England
129	Win	99–21–8 (1)	Sid Butler	KO	2 (15)	May 31, 1926	27 years, 150 days	Alcazar, Edmonton, London, England
128	Win	98–21–8 (1)	Joe Woolford	KO	7 (15)	May 17, 1926	27 years, 136 days	Alcazar, Edmonton, London, England
127	Draw	97–21–8 (1)	Laurie Raiteri	PTS	15	Mar 5, 1926	27 years, 63 days	St. Matthew's Baths, Ipswich, Suffolk, England
126	NC	97–21–7 (1)	Frankie Brown	NC	13 (15)	Mar 2, 1926	27 years, 60 days	Lime Grove Baths, Shepherd's Bush, London, England
125	Win	97–21–7	Fernand Blampain	PTS	15	Mar 1, 1926	27 years, 59 days	Victoria Baths, Nottingham, Nottinghamshire, England
124	Win	96–21–7	Jan van Dam	TKO	2 (15)	Feb 24, 1926	27 years, 54 days	Fulham Baths, Fulham, London, England
123	Loss	95–21–7	Billy Mattick	DQ	5 (15)	Feb 11, 1926	27 years, 41 days	The Ring, Blackfriars Road, Southwark, London, England
122	Loss	95–20–7	Len Harvey	KO	8 (15)	Feb 2, 1926	27 years, 32 days	Lime Grove Baths, Shepherd's Bush, London, England
121	Win	95–19–7	Laurie Raiteri	PTS	15	Feb 1, 1926	27 years, 31 days	Victoria Works AC, East Greenwich, London, England
120	Win	94–19–7	George Carney	KO	4 (15)	Jan 13, 1926	27 years, 12 days	Pitfield Street Baths, Hoxton, London, England
119	Loss	93–19–7	Ernie Rice	TKO	2 (15)	Jan 6, 1926	27 years, 5 days	Fulham Baths, Fulham, London, England
118	Win	93–18–7	Steve Maher	RTD	2 (15)	Nov 6, 1925	26 years, 309 days	St. Matthew's Baths, Ipswich, Suffolk, England
117	Win	92–18–7	Frank Lane	PTS	15	Nov 4, 1925	26 years, 307 days	Fulham Baths, Fulham, London, England
116	Win	91–18–7	Harry Byford	TKO	2 (15)	Oct 28, 1925	26 years, 300 days	Central Baths, East Ham, London, England
115	Win	90–18–7	Arthur Tyrell	PTS	15	Sep 28, 1925	26 years, 270 days	Victoria Works AC, East Greenwich, London, England
114	Win	89–18–7	Kid Jackson	DQ	5 (15)	Jul 30, 1925	26 years, 210 days	Liverpool Stadium, Pudsey Street, Liverpool, Merseyside, England
113	Win	88–18–7	Mickey Marks	TKO	6 (15)	Jul 26, 1925	26 years, 206 days	Premierland, Whitechapel, London, England
112	Win	87–18–7	Harry Byford	PTS	12	Jul 13, 1925	26 years, 193 days	Alcazar, Edmonton, London, England
111	Win	86–18–7	George Jackson	KO	6 (15)	Jul 2, 1925	26 years, 182 days	Liverpool Stadium, Pudsey Street, Liverpool, Merseyside, England
110	Win	85–18–7	Mike Honeyman	RTD	7 (15)	Jun 24, 1925	26 years, 174 days	The Dome, Brighton, Sussex, England
109	Win	84–18–7	Luther Thomas	RTD	3 (10)	May 25, 1925	26 years, 144 days	Central Hall, Canning Town, London, England
108	Win	83–18–7	Kid Jackson	DQ	5 (15)	Apr 30, 1925	26 years, 119 days	Liverpool Stadium, Pudsey Street, Liverpool, Merseyside, England
107	Win	82–18–7	Harry Byford	PTS	15	Apr 19, 1925	26 years, 108 days	Essex Hall, Walthamstow, London, England
106	Win	81–18–7	Billy Gilmore	PTS	15	Apr 14, 1925	26 years, 103 days	St. George's Market, Belfast, Northern Ireland
105	Win	80–18–7	Tom Humphreys	PTS	15	Mar 23, 1925	26 years, 81 days	Drill Hall, Bow, London, England
104	Loss	79–18–7	Reggie Caswell	DQ	6 (12)	Mar 16, 1925	26 years, 74 days	The Ring, Blackfriars Road, Southwark, London, England
103	Draw	79–17–7	Mike Honeyman	PTS	15	Mar 11, 1925	26 years, 69 days	Central Baths, East Ham, London, England
102	Win	79–17–6	Jim Lavin	PTS	10	Mar 9, 1925	26 years, 67 days	Drill Hall, Coventry, West Midlands, England
101	Win	78–17–6	Len Cutts	TKO	3 (15)	Feb 17, 1925	26 years, 47 days	Lime Grove Baths, Shepherd's Bush, London, England
100	Win	77–17–6	Frankie Brown	PTS	15	Feb 16, 1925	26 years, 46 days	Drill Hall, Bow, London, England
99	Win	76–17–6	Arthur Tyrell	PTS	12	Jan 25, 1925	26 years, 24 days	Manor Hall, Hackney, London, England
98	Win	75–17–6	Bob Bates	PTS	10	Jan 12, 1925	26 years, 11 days	National Sporting Club, Covent Garden, London, England
97	Win	74–17–6	Bert Brown	PTS	10	Dec 1, 1924	25 years, 335 days	National Sporting Club, Covent Garden, London, England
96	Loss	73–17–6	Frank Lane	RTD	6 (15)	Nov 29, 1924	25 years, 333 days	The Ring, Blackfriars Road, Southwark, London, England
95	Win	73–16–6	Luther Thomas	PTS	15	Nov 21, 1924	25 years, 325 days	Dreamland Ballroom, Margate, Kent, England
94	Loss	72–16–6	Mike Honeyman	PTS	20	Nov 5, 1924	25 years, 309 days	Walham Green Baths, Fulham, London, England
93	Win	72–15–6	Bob Bates	PTS	15	Oct 20, 1924	25 years, 293 days	Victoria Works AC, East Greenwich, London, England
92	Win	71–15–6	Young Mars	TKO	6 (15)	Sep 25, 1924	25 years, 268 days	The Ring, Blackfriars Road, Southwark, London, England
91	Loss	70–15–6	Albert Johnson	PTS	15	Sep 22, 1924	25 years, 265 days	Drill Hall, Coventry, West Midlands, England
90	Win	70–14–6	Bill Blake	KO	1 (12)	Sep 8, 1924	25 years, 251 days	The Ring, Blackfriars Road, Southwark, London, England
89	Win	69–14–6	Willie Louw	TKO	4 (12)	Aug 7, 1924	25 years, 219 days	The Ring, Blackfriars Road, Southwark, London, England
88	Win	68–14–6	Sam Steward	TKO	10 (15)	Jul 19, 1924	25 years, 200 days	The Ring, Blackfriars Road, Southwark, London, England
87	Win	67–14–6	Charlie Evans	RTD	4 (15)	Jun 28, 1924	25 years, 179 days	The Ring, Blackfriars Road, Southwark, London, England
86	Win	66–14–6	Chris Gorman	KO	2 (10)	Jun 8, 1924	25 years, 159 days	Manor Hall, Hackney, London, England
85	Win	65–14–6	Albert Quinn	TKO	4 (15)	May 29, 1924	25 years, 149 days	The Ring, Blackfriars Road, Southwark, London, England
84	Loss	64–14–6	Alf Mancini	PTS	20	Mar 26, 1924	25 years, 85 days	Fulham Baths, Fulham, London, England
83	Win	64–13–6	Con Hollingsworth	PTS	15	Mar 25, 1924	25 years, 84 days	National Sporting Club, Covent Garden, London, England
82	Win	63–13–6	Tommy Ryan	TKO	8 (15)	Mar 11, 1924	25 years, 70 days	Lime Grove Baths, Shepherd's Bush, London, England
81	Loss	62–13–6	Albert Johnson	PTS	15	Mar 8, 1924	25 years, 67 days	Holmeside Stadium, Sunderland, Tyne and Wear, England
80	Win	62–12–6	Patsy Coram	RTD	10 (20)	Feb 26, 1924	25 years, 56 days	Lime Grove Baths, Shepherd's Bush, London, England
79	Win	61–12–6	Charlie Lane	PTS	15	Feb 15, 1924	25 years, 45 days	St. Andrew's Hall, Battersea, London, England
78	Win	60–12–6	Harry Roose	RTD	11 (20)	Feb 13, 1924	25 years, 43 days	Fulham Baths, North End Road, Walham Green, London, England
77	Draw	59–12–6	Andy Newton	PTS	20	Jan 28, 1924	25 years, 27 days	Kensington Baths, Kensington, London, England
76	Win	59–12–5	Billy Quinn	PTS	15	Jan 7, 1924	25 years, 6 days	Pitfield Street Baths, Hoxton, London, England
75	Win	58–12–5	Bob Sadler	PTS	10	Dec 28, 1923	24 years, 361 days	Palais de Danse, Northampton, Northamptonshire, England
74	Win	57–12–5	Luther Thomas	PTS	15	Nov 2, 1923	24 years, 305 days	Dreamland Ballroom, Margate, Kent, England
73	Win	56–12–5	Ivor Lewis	RTD	6 (10)	Oct 22, 1923	24 years, 294 days	National Sporting Club, Covent Garden, London, England
72	Loss	55–12–5	George Carney	KO	7 (15)	Sep 15, 1923	24 years, 257 days	The Ring, Blackfriars Road, Southwark, London, England
71	Win	55–11–5	Charlie Evans	PTS	15	Aug 30, 1923	24 years, 241 days	The Ring, Blackfriars Road, Southwark, London, England
70	Loss	54–11–5	Billy Fry	RTD	5 (15)	Aug 2, 1923	24 years, 213 days	Liverpool Stadium, Pudsey Street, Liverpool, Merseyside, England
69	Win	54–10–5	Tommy Williams	TKO	2 (10)	Jul 30, 1923	24 years, 210 days	The Ring, Blackfriars Road, Southwark, London, England
68	Win	53–10–5	Bill Jones	RTD	5 (10)	May 28, 1923	24 years, 147 days	The Ring, Blackfriars Road, Southwark, London, England
67	Loss	52–10–5	Corporal Frank Downton	DQ	6 (10)	May 12, 1923	24 years, 131 days	The Ring, Blackfriars Road, Southwark, London, England
66	Win	52–9–5	Billy Quinn	TKO	6 (10)	Apr 8, 1923	24 years, 97 days	Manor Hall, Hackney, London, England
65	Win	51–9–5	Tommy Williams	TKO	8 (10)	Mar 31, 1923	24 years, 89 days	The Ring, Blackfriars Road, Southwark, London, England
64	Win	50–9–5	George Gamester	PTS	15	Mar 28, 1923	24 years, 86 days	Lancaster Road Baths, Kensington, London, England
63	Draw	49–9–5	Len Collett	PTS	10	Mar 19, 1923	24 years, 77 days	The Ring, Blackfriars Road, Southwark, London, England
62	Loss	49–9–4	Andy Newton	PTS	10	Feb 15, 1923	24 years, 45 days	Royal Albert Hall, Kensington, London, England
61	Win	49–8–4	Jimmy Green	PTS	15	Feb 7, 1923	24 years, 37 days	Ladywell Baths, Lewisham, London, England
60	Win	48–8–4	Ted Spiers	PTS	10	Jan 25, 1923	24 years, 24 days	Palais de Danse, Clapton, London, England
59	Win	47–8–4	Jack Smith	PTS	15	Jan 24, 1923	24 years, 23 days	Victoria Works AC, East Greenwich, London, England
58	Win	46–8–4	Con Hollingsworth	PTS	10	Jan 14, 1923	24 years, 13 days	Manor Hall, Hackney, London, England
57	Win	45–8–4	Jimmy Green	PTS	15	Jan 13, 1923	24 years, 12 days	The Ring, Blackfriars Road, Southwark, London, England
56	Win	44–8–4	Alf Neale	PTS	10	Jan 3, 1923	24 years, 2 days	Walham Green Baths, Fulham, London, England
55	Draw	43–8–4	Alf Wye	PTS	10	Jan 2, 1923	24 years, 1 day	National Sporting Club, Covent Garden, London, England
54	Win	43–8–3	Corporal Frank Downton	PTS	15	Dec 15, 1922	23 years, 348 days	The Ring, Portsmouth, Hampshire, England
53	Win	42–8–3	Jack Crowley	TKO	7 (10)	Dec 3, 1922	23 years, 336 days	Manor Hall, Hackney, London, England
52	Loss	41–8–3	Evan Williams	KO	11 (20)	Nov 16, 1922	23 years, 319 days	Pitfield Street Baths, Hoxton, London, England
51	Win	41–7–3	Ted Spiers	PTS	10	Nov 6, 1922	23 years, 309 days	The Ring, Blackfriars Road, Southwark, London, England
50	Win	40–7–3	Alf Wye	PTS	15	Nov 3, 1922	23 years, 306 days	Dreamland Ballroom, Margate, Kent, England
49	Win	39–7–3	Charlie Lane	RTD	7 (10)	Oct 7, 1922	23 years, 279 days	The Ring, Blackfriars Road, Southwark, London, England
48	Win	38–7–3	Billy Duckworth	KO	4 (10)	Sep 23, 1922	23 years, 265 days	The Ring, Blackfriars Road, Southwark, London, England
47	Win	37–7–3	Charlie Lane	PTS	3	Sep 16, 1922	23 years, 258 days	The Ring, Blackfriars Road, Southwark, London, England
46	Loss	36–7–3	Andy Newton	PTS	4	Sep 16, 1922	23 years, 258 days	The Ring, Blackfriars Road, Southwark, London, England
45	Win	36–6–3	Seaman Harry Bowles	RTD	5 (15)	Aug 24, 1922	23 years, 235 days	Drill Hall, Clapham, London, England
44	Win	35–6–3	Billy Mack	PTS	10	Aug 20, 1922	23 years, 231 days	Manor Hall, Hackney, London, England
43	Win	34–6–3	Alf Neale	TKO	4 (10)	Aug 5, 1922	23 years, 216 days	The Ring, Blackfriars Road, Southwark, London, England
42	Win	33–6–3	Kid Smith	RTD	10 (10)	Aug 5, 1922	23 years, 216 days	The Ring, Blackfriars Road, Southwark, London, England
41	Draw	32–6–3	Con Hollingsworth	PTS	15	Jul 22, 1922	23 years, 202 days	Harrow Football Ground, Stratford, London, England
40	Win	32–6–2	Billy Duckworth	RTD	6 (10)	May 27, 1922	23 years, 146 days	The Ring, Blackfriars Road, Southwark, London, England
39	Win	31–6–2	Billy Quinn	PTS	10	May 6, 1922	23 years, 125 days	The Ring, Blackfriars Road, Southwark, London, England
38	Loss	30–6–2	Billy Quinn	PTS	10	Mar 24, 1922	23 years, 82 days	Manor Hall, Hackney, London, England
37	Loss	30–5–2	Fred Morrison	RTD	7 (10)	Mar 13, 1922	23 years, 71 days	Plumstead Baths, Plumstead, London, England
36	Win	30–4–2	Jim King	RTD	8 (10)	Mar 9, 1922	23 years, 67 days	Tredegar Road Drill Hall, Bow, London, England
35	Win	29–4–2	Tug Wilson	PTS	10	Feb 17, 1922	23 years, 47 days	Dreamland Ballroom, Margate, Kent, England
34	Loss	28–4–2	Andy Newton	PTS	20	Feb 8, 1922	23 years, 38 days	Walham Green Baths, Fulham, London, England
33	Loss	28–3–2	Bob Jackson	RTD	11 (15)	Jan 26, 1922	23 years, 25 days	The Ring, Blackfriars Road, Southwark, London, England
32	Win	28–2–2	Harry Rudge	PTS	10	Dec 13, 1921	22 years, 346 days	Lime Grove Baths, Shepherd's Bush, London, England
31	Win	27–2–2	Jimmy Green	PTS	10	Dec 12, 1921	22 years, 345 days	National Sporting Club, Covent Garden, London, England
30	Draw	26–2–2	Joe Casbolt	PTS	15	Oct 19, 1921	22 years, 291 days	Drill Hall, Camden Town, London, England
29	Win	26–2–1	Dan Ryan	RTD	6 (10)	Sep 28, 1921	22 years, 270 days	Boxing Club, Dulwich, London, England
28	Loss	25–2–1	Tommy Phillips	PTS	10	Sep 22, 1921	22 years, 264 days	The Ring, Blackfriars Road, Southwark, London, England
27	Win	25–1–1	Tommy Morgan	PTS	6	Sep 15, 1921	22 years, 257 days	The Ring, Blackfriars Road, Southwark, London, England
26	Win	24–1–1	Johnny Walker	TKO	4 (6)	Sep 8, 1921	22 years, 250 days	The Ring, Blackfriars Road, Southwark, London, England
25	Win	23–1–1	Joe Casbolt	PTS	10	Aug 6, 1921	22 years, 217 days	The Ring, Blackfriars Road, Southwark, London, England
24	Win	22–1–1	Tug Wilson	PTS	10	Jul 15, 1921	22 years, 195 days	Dreamland Ballroom, Margate, Kent, England
23	Win	21–1–1	Dick Beland	KO	3 (10)	Jun 13, 1921	22 years, 163 days	National Sporting Club, Covent Garden, London, England
22	Win	20–1–1	Jim Rowley	KO	2 (10)	Jun 11, 1921	22 years, 161 days	The Ring, Blackfriars Road, Southwark, London, England
21	Win	19–1–1	Roy Strathmere	TKO	5 (10)	Jun 3, 1921	22 years, 153 days	Dreamland Ballroom, Margate, Kent, England
20	Win	18–1–1	Corporal Atkins	KO	3 (10)	May 30, 1921	22 years, 149 days	National Sporting Club, Covent Garden, London, England
19	Win	17–1–1	Jimmy Green	RTD	8 (10)	May 21, 1921	22 years, 140 days	The Ring, Blackfriars Road, Southwark, London, England
18	Win	16–1–1	Jim Hodges	TKO	4 (10)	Apr 28, 1921	22 years, 117 days	Boxing Club, Dulwich, London, England
17	Win	15–1–1	Alf Mancini	PTS	10	Mar 22, 1921	22 years, 80 days	Walham Green Baths, Fulham, London, England
16	Win	14–1–1	Moss Ruffell	RTD	4 (10)	Mar 5, 1921	22 years, 63 days	The Ring, Blackfriars Road, Southwark, London, England
15	Win	13–1–1	Mick Hill	PTS	10	Feb 23, 1921	22 years, 53 days	Fulham Baths, Fulham, London, England
14	Win	12–1–1	Sid George	RTD	4 (10)	Jan 18, 1921	22 years, 17 days	Acton Baths, Acton, London, England
13	Draw	11–1–1	Billy Quinn	PTS	10	Jan 12, 1921	22 years, 11 days	Fulham Baths, Fulham, London, England
12	Win	11–1	Albert Westcott	PTS	10	Dec 16, 1920	21 years, 350 days	Corn Exchange, Ipswich, Suffolk, England
11	Win	10–1	Jack Cowley	PTS	10	Dec 8, 1920	21 years, 342 days	Brentford Baths, Brentford, London, England
10	Win	9–1	Sergeant Harnetty	KO	2 (10)	Nov 3, 1920	21 years, 307 days	Walham Green Baths, Fulham, London, England
9	Win	8–1	Young Fagen	TKO	2 (6)	Oct 14, 1920	21 years, 287 days	The Ring, Blackfriars Road, Southwark, London, England
8	Win	7–1	Jack Dunston	RTD	1 (10)	Oct 11, 1920	21 years, 284 days	Corn Exchange, Romford, London, England
7	Win	6–1	Private Creamer	TKO	6 (15)	Sep 20, 1920	21 years, 263 days	Custom House, Chatham, Kent, England
6	Win	5–1	Teddy Affleck	TKO	3 (6)	Apr 12, 1920	21 years, 102 days	Holborn Stadium, Holborn, London, England
5	Win	4–1	Sergeant Harnetty	TKO	5 (6)	Mar 17, 1920	21 years, 76 days	Walham Green Baths, Fulham, London, England
4	Win	3–1	Gus Verrall	TKO	5 (6)	Mar 3, 1920	21 years, 62 days	Fulham Baths, Fulham, London, England
3	Loss	2–1	Ned Rolley	KO	1 (6)	Feb 28, 1920	21 years, 58 days	Pitfield Street Baths, Hoxton, London, England
2	Win	2–0	Albert Allen	PTS	10	Feb 23, 1920	21 years, 53 days	Wimbledon Baths, Wimbledon, London, England
1	Win	1–0	George Ratty	PTS	6	Feb 11, 1920	21 years, 41 days	Pitfield Street Baths, Hoxton, London, England
