= Fred Webster (boxer) =

British boxer

Personal information
- Nationality: British
- Born: 18 June 1908
- Died: 1971
- Weight: Lightweight

Boxing career

Boxing record
- Total fights: 65
- Wins: 46
- Win by KO: 5
- Losses: 14
- Draws: 5

Frederick Webster (18 June 1908 – 1971) was a British boxer who was a three time British amateur champion and competed in the 1928 Summer Olympics. As a professional he held the British lightweight title between 1929 and 1930.

== Career ==
From Kentish Town, Fred Webster was a member of the St. Pancras Boxing Club. Webster was a British amateur champion in three different weight classifications (bantamweight, featherweight, and lightweight) in successive years from 1926 to 1928, a feat not matched until Joe Calzaghe won his third title in 1993. At the 1928 Summer Olympics he was eliminated in the second round of the lightweight class after losing his fight to David Baan of the Netherlands.

He subsequently turned professional, winning his first pro fight against Charles Ernst in October 1928. He went on to beat George Rose and British lightweight champion Sam Steward in January 1929. He drew with Jack Hyams in March before challenging for Steward's title in May, taking a points decision to become British champion in only his sixth pro fight. He defended the British title in May 1930 against Al Foreman, with the British Empire title also at stake; Foreman knocked him out in the first round to take both titles.

Webster had some notable wins in the years that followed, including victories over Harry Corbett, Len "Tiger" Smith, Harry Mason, Billy Bird, Rose again, and Pat Butler, but never again fought for a title. A defeat to Mason in July 1933 started a run of eight fights of which he won only two, and Webster retired from boxing after losing to Johnny Rust in September 1934.

Webster married Grace Lilian Hodgson in February 1932.
