= Seaman Nobby Hall =

Scottish boxer

Personal information
- Born: James Hall; 15 October 1892 Peebles, Scotland
- Died: 13 November 1953 (aged 61)
- Weight: Lightweight

Boxing career

Boxing record
- Total fights: 33
- Wins: 18
- Win by KO: 4
- Losses: 12
- Draws: 3

James Hall (15 October 1892 – 13 November 1953), better known as Seaman Nobby Hall, was a Scottish boxer who was British and European lightweight champion between 1922 and 1923.

== Career ==
Born in Peebles in 1892, James Hall began his professional boxing career in 1917. A sailor on the Royal Navy, he won several Imperial Services Championships, but began his pro career with two defeats. In February 1919 he beat former British bantamweight champion Curley Walker on points and in November drew with Ted Moore. In August 1921 he took a notable scalp when he beat former British, European, and World champion Matt Wells and in January 1922 beat French champion Georges Papin.

Undefeated since September 1920, in September 1922 he beat Ernie Rice at Liverpool Stadium to become lightweight champion of Britain and Europe. He suffered his first defeat in two years the following month when he was beaten on points by Alex Ireland.

He successfully defended his British title in January 1923 against Johnny Brown at the Industrial Hall in Edinburgh, but lost both titles at Olympia in May to Harry Mason, after being disqualified in the thirteenth round for low blows. He lost again to Mason in October.

He continued boxing, largely without his earlier success until the end of 1924. After being out of the ring in 1925 he returned in January 1926 to fight Tommy McInnes, losing by an eighth-round knockout. It was almost two and a half years before his next fight, a win over Kid Charlie at the New World Arena in Singapore. Hall would fight at locations where the ship that he was serving on docked.

From mid-1931 to early 1934 he fought more regularly in the UK and while he fought some notable boxers of the time he never again challenged for a title. He made a final comeback in October 1935, at the age of 43, drawing with Jim Hendry.
