= Ernie Rice =

English boxer

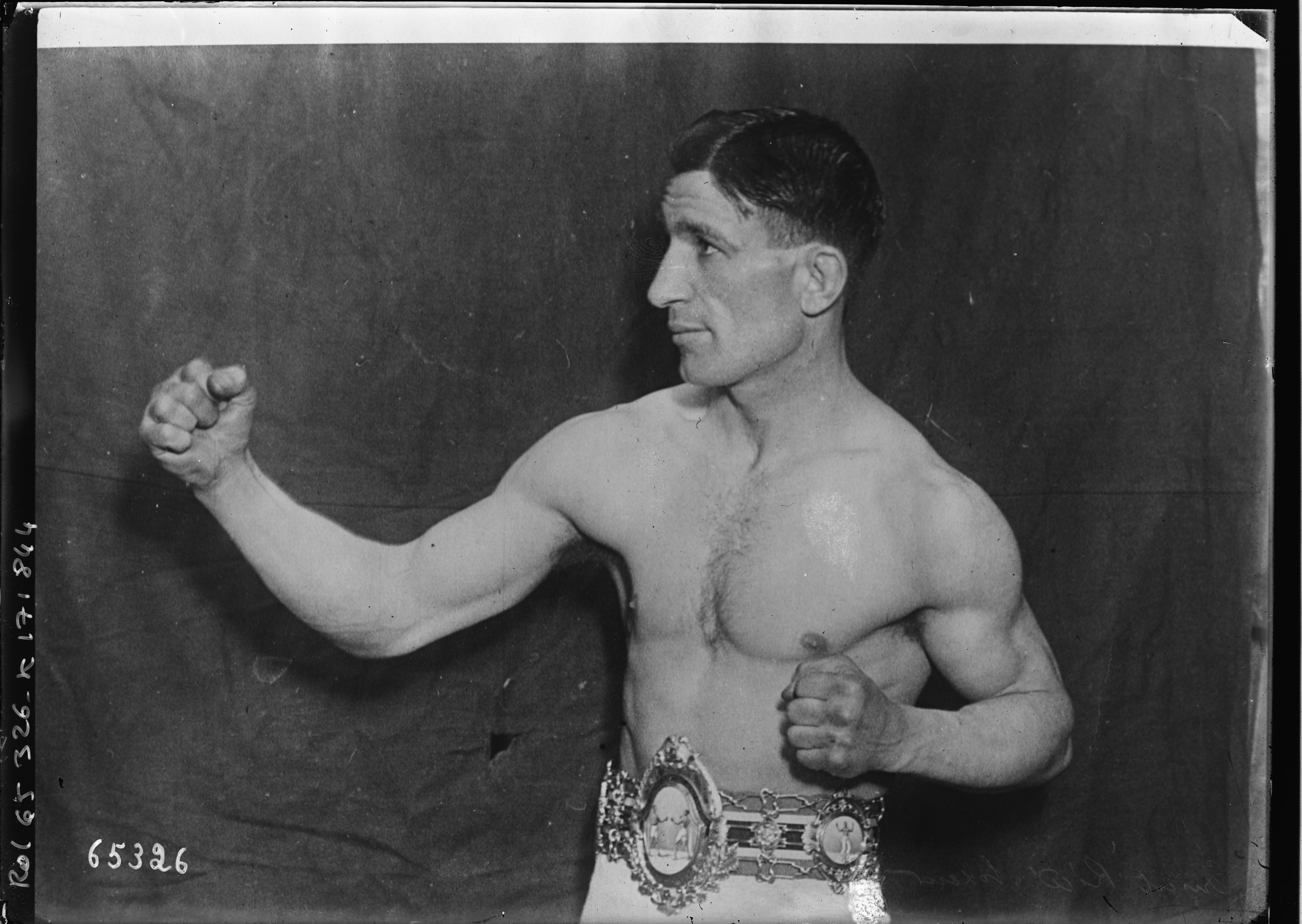
- Ernie Rice (1921)

Personal information
- Nickname: Elbows
- Nationality: British
- Born: John Tomasso; 17 November 1896 Hull, England
- Died: 1979 (aged 82)
- Weight: Lightweight

Boxing career

Boxing record
- Total fights: 83
- Wins: 50
- Losses: 28
- Draws: 2
- No contests: 3

John Tomasso (17 November 1896 – 1979), better known as Ernie Rice, was a British boxer who was British and European lightweight champion between 1921 and 1922. After retiring from boxing he became an actor, appearing in several films and television series.

== Career ==
Born in Hull in 1896, Ernie Rice fought out of Hounslow and made his professional début in December 1911 with a loss to Bill Mansell. His early record was undistinguished and in 1917 lost six of his first nine fights, including a defeat at the hands of French champion Georges Papin.

He beat Joe Conn in November 1920 and in April 1921 knocked out Ben Callicott in the seventh round to win the British lightweight title vacated by Bob Marriott. A month later he fought Papin again, this time with Papin's European lightweight title at stake; Papin retired in the tenth round, giving Rice the European title to add to his British title.

Later in 1921, he travelled to the United States where he stopped Richie Mitchell in the fourth round, Mitchell suffering a broken arm, and lost due to a cut eye to Sailor Friedman at Madison Square Garden.

In September 1922, he was beaten on points over 20 rounds by Seaman Nobby Hall at Liverpool Stadium, losing his British and European titles.

Three wins in 1923 set him up for another challenge for the British and European titles, then held by Harry Mason. Mason won on points to retain the titles.

After losing to Fred Bretonnel in Paris in December 1923, Rice travelled to Australia in May 1924 where he had seven fights. In June 1925, he beat South African champion Reggie Hull in Durban before returning to England.

After returning to his home country in August he had a run of six straight wins between October 1925 and January 1926, including wins over Ernie Izzard and Billy Bird, and in February 1926 challenged for Mason's British title at the Royal Albert Hall; Rice was disqualified in the fifth round for a low blow.

Rice drew with Alf Simmons in March 1926, but beat him in a rematch three months later.

It was almost two years before Rice returned to the ring. After beating Sam Minto in April, in September 1928 he faced Sam Steward for the British title vacated by Mason. In what was the last British title fight to be staged over 20 rounds, Steward knocked Rice out in the twelfth round.

Rice was again out of the ring for two years, returning in September 1930 to face Mason in what would be Rice's final fight. The two came to blows at the Savoy Hotel prior to the fight at a meeting to decide on a referee. The fight was over quickly, with Rice disqualified after 12 seconds after hitting Mason three times while he was on the canvas.

After retiring from boxing, Rice became a boxing referee and also had a career in acting, appearing in films such as Keep Fit (1937), Oliver Twist (1948), The Lavender Hill Mob (1951), Lawrence of Arabia (1962), and several Carry On films and television series.

Ernie Rice's cousin Bandsman Dick Rice was also a successful boxer who fought for British, European, and World titles. His other cousin Toni (sibling to Dick) was also a boxer before becoming a professional musician and the leader of the Santa Maria Dance Band, which regularly performed on British radio.
