= Ernie Izzard =

English boxer

Personal information
- Nickname: The Herne Hill Hairpin
- Nationality: British
- Born: Ernest Alfred Izzard; 25 February 1905 Herne Hill, England
- Died: December 1970 (aged 65)
- Weight: Featherweight, lightweight

Boxing career

Boxing record
- Total fights: 126
- Wins: 95
- Win by KO: 31
- Losses: 20
- Draws: 9
- No contests: 2

Ernest Alfred Izzard (25 February 1905 – December 1970) was a British boxer who was British lightweight champion between 1924 and 1925 and went on to fight for European and British Empire titles.

== Career ==
Born in Herne Hill, Izzard was nicknamed "The Herne Hill Hairpin" and began his professional career in 1920. Initially a featherweight, he was a contender for the British title at that weight and beat Jack Alexander in a title eliminator in February 1924. He moved up to lightweight and, after beating Tommy McInnes and Alf Mancini, fought Jack Kirk in November 1924 for the vacant British title, winning on points over twenty rounds. He successfully defended the title in April 1925 against Teddy Baker, and two months later faced Harry Mason with Izzard's British and Mason's European lightweight titles at stake; Izzard retired at the start of the ninth round, giving Mason both titles. He had three further fights that year - wins over Belgian champion Henri Dupont and Rene Kelly and a loss by fourth-round knockout to Ernie Rice.

Izzard appeared in newspaper advertisements endorsing Virol (a bone-marrow preparation) in the mid 1920s, stating that having been born with a weight of only 3lbs and 2oz, taking the product had turned him into a championship boxer.

In 1928 he travelled to Australia for a series of fights starting with a draw with Charlie Purdy in January, a win over Irishman Bob Miller in April, and a win over Purdy in May. In June he challenged Tommy Fairhall for the British Empire lightweight title at the Sydney Stadium, losing on points over fifteen rounds.

Izzard continued to fight regularly until the end of 1930. He had one drawn fight in 1931, four fights in 1932, then was out of the ring for three years before returning for two fights in 1935 before retiring. In a career in which he had at least 126 fights, he won 95, 31 by knockout.

In 1932 he was appointed to the position of boxing coach for the Oxford University Boxing Club.

Ernie Izzard died in December 1970, aged 65.
