= Johnny Brown (Scottish boxer) =

Scottish boxer

Personal information
- Nickname: Hamilton Johnny Brown
- Nationality: British
- Born: John Fleming; 19 September 1900 Hamilton, Lanarkshire, Scotland
- Died: 27 May 1961 (aged 60) Glasgow, Scotland
- Weight: Featherweight, lightweight, welterweight, middleweight

Boxing career

John Fleming (1900–1961), better known as Johnny Brown and sometimes as Hamilton Johnny Brown, was a Scottish boxer who was an amateur champion at featherweight and British welterweight champion in 1925.

== Career ==
From Hamilton, South Lanarkshire, Fleming first found success as an amateur, winning the East of Scotland title in 1919 and the ABA featherweight title in 1920, before turning professional later that year, fighting under the name Johnny Brown. Although lacking a knockout punch, Brown's speed and skill brought him considerable success.

He won all of his fights between 1920 and 1922, including victory over Jim Gilmour to take the Scottish lightweight title in June 1922, leading to a shot at the British and European lightweight titles in January 1923 against Seaman Nobby Hall in which Brown's Scottish title was also at stake; Hall took a 20-round points decision.

Brown moved up to welterweight and took the Scottish welterweight title in May 1923 with a 20-round points decision over Alex Ireland; He successfully defended the title against Ireland in January 1924.

In July 1924 he fought Ted Kid Lewis for the British, Commonwealth, and European welterweight titles at the Royal Albert Hall, Lewis winning on points. In September 1924 Brown lost his Scottish title to fellow Hamiltonian Tommy Milligan. He beat Belgian welterweight champion Nol Steenhorst in February 1925.

In October 1925 Brown fought Harry Mason for the British welterweight title vacated by Milligan, and took a points decision to become champion. His reign as champion was short-lived — in a return match a month later Mason took the decision. In September 1926 Brown regained his Scottish welterweight title by again beating Ireland.

Towards the end of his career Brown moved up to middleweight, and fought Steve McCall (who had beaten him at welterweight a year earlier) for the Scottish middleweight title in December 1928. McCall won on points, and beat Brown again in March 1929 when the two fought for the title again, the first Scottish Area title fought under the auspices of the British Boxing Board of Control and the last major fight to be held in Britain over 20 rounds.

Brown's final fight was a defeat to Sandy McKenzie in December 1929.

Brown married Jeanetta Winifred Blythe in Glasgow on 29 April 1925.
