= Tommy Fairhall =

Australian boxer (1901–?)

Personal information
- Nickname: Nutty Fairhall
- Nationality: Australian
- Born: Thomas Fairhall; 25 November 1901 Raymond Terrace, Newcastle, New South Wales, Australia
- Height: 5 ft 7 1/2 in (1.71 m)
- Weight: bantam/feather/light/welter/middleweight

Boxing career
- Reach: 69 in (175 cm)

Boxing record
- Total fights: 106
- Wins: 73 (KO 35)
- Losses: 23 (KO 4)
- Draws: 8
- No contests: 2

Thomas Fairhall (25 November 1901 — ?) born in Raymond Terrace, Newcastle, New South Wales was an Australian professional bantam/feather/light/welter/middleweight boxer of the 1910s, '20s and '30s who won the Australian lightweight title, Australian welterweight title, and British Empire lightweight title, his professional fighting weight varied from 118 lb (54 kg; 8 st 6 lb), i.e. bantamweight to 154 lb (69.9 kg; 11 st 0 lb), i.e. middleweight.
