= Harry Mason (boxer) =

British boxer (1903–1977)

Personal information
- Nickname: "The Little Fiddler"
- Nationality: British
- Born: 27 March 1903 Bethnal Green, London, England
- Died: 27 August 1977 (aged 74) South Africa
- Weight: Lightweight, welterweight

Boxing career
- Stance: Orthodox

Boxing record
- Total fights: 216
- Wins: 147
- Win by KO: 26
- Losses: 53
- Draws: 15

Harry Mason (27 March 1903 – 27 August 1977) was a British boxer who was a British and European (EBU) champion in the lightweight division and British champion in the welterweight division.

== Career ==
Born in Bethnal Green on 27 March 1903 to a Jewish family, Mason moved to Leeds as a child, where he worked as a trolley boy for the London & North Eastern Railway.

He made his professional debut in August 1920, beating Young Bull over 10 rounds.

=== British and European lightweight title ===
On 17 May 1923, he defeated Seaman Nobby Hall, recognised as the reigning British and European lightweight champion, at the Olympia Club in Kensington, England, to win the British lightweight title. Hall was disqualified for a low blow in the thirteenth of a scheduled twenty rounds. Mason was later recognized in September 1923 by the European Broadcasting Union as European champion.

He travelled to the United States in 1924 for a series of fights before returning to England towards the end of the year. In April 1925 he fought Lucien Vinez in Paris to decide who would challenge for the world title, but the match ended in a draw.

Mason met fellow Jewish boxer Philadelphian Harry "Kid" Brown at the Pioneer Sporting Club in New York on 15 January 1924, winning in a ten-round points decision. Mason showed fine footwork and a careful defence. After a slow first four rounds, Mason began to land on Brown's midsection frequently, and easily rolled away from Brown's punches. Mason's punch was not considered particularly strong by American standards. On 12 February 1924, Mason defeated Herb Brodie in a twelve-round points decision at New York's Pioneer Sporting Club. In his career, Brodie would meet many of the better American junior welterweights of his day including Leo Houck.

==== Defence of lightweight titles ====
In June 1925 he fought British champion Ernie Izzard in a defence of his British and European lightweight titles at Holland Park Rink in Kensington, and won when Izzard failed to return to the ring after the eighth round. In his first trip to the canvas, a right uppercut from Mason put Izzard down for a count of nine in the eighth. When he arose, Mason put him to the canvas again with a few wild swings. Izzard struggled up using the ropes but was pummeled by Mason, though at the eighth round bell, he had the stamina to remain on his feet.

In October 1925, he moved up to welterweight to first challenge Johnny Brown for the vacant British welterweight title, losing a 20-round points decision.

=== British welterweight champion ===
He took the British welterweight title for the first time from "Hamilton" Johnny Brown on 19 November 1925 in a twenty-round points decision at the Royal Albert Hall in Kensington, making him a career holder of British championships in two weight classes.

He lost the British Welterweight title to Jack Hood on 31 May 1926, in a highly disputed twenty rounds decision in Kensington, England, and later unsuccessfully appealed against the official ruling. In 1928 he travelled to Australia for a series of fights.

In his most widely publicized bout in Australia on 25 August 1928, Mason lost to Tommy "Nutty" Fairhall in a fifteen-round points decision at Sydney Stadium. In a decisive loss, Mason was floored in both the first and fifteenth rounds. The two had previously given a training exhibition at Sydney's Rushcutter Stadium on 22 August that was followed by a vaudeville act.

He avenged his previous loss to Jack Hood in a rematch on 20 March 1930 in a non-title fight back in Albert Hall in Kensington, the two having exchanged blows at the weigh-in; Mason defeated Hood in a fifteen-round points decision. In 1928 he travelled to Australia for a series of fights.

In an important defence of his lightweight title on 29 April 1926, Mason drew with ring great Len Harvey at Royal Albert Hall in Kensington. In a close match, Harvey had the advantage in height and reach, and did well with lefts to the face and body, but Mason scored with straight lefts to the body throughout the bout. Mason was down in the first and eighteenth rounds.

Mason lost to future world welterweight champion Tommy Freeman on 18 August 1927, in a ten-round points decision at New York's Madison Square Garden. Though he took a serious beating in a decisive loss, Mason remained on his feet throughout the bout, after having some trouble in the first. His third round was his best, but in the majority of rounds, Freeman appeared to deliver three times the number of blows as Mason. A Depression crowd of only 5,000 attended the Garden's bout, having limited interest in the foreign challenger to Freeman.

Mason had his first bout in South Africa against Oscar Jacobsohn in Johannesberg on 9 May 1929, winning a ten-round points decision. Mason would continue to box in South Africa through September 1929, though the bouts garnered limited newspaper coverage. He would eventually make his home in South Africa after his retirement from the ring.

In an important career bout, Mason lost to former world welterweight champion Joe Dundee on 28 May 1930, in a ten-round points decision at Madison Square Garden. A crowd of only 5,000 showed up to see the bout. In his first showing in America, Mason caught Dundee on the chin in the opening of the first round, but somehow Dundee made it through to the bell, recovering well by the second. After the first, where Mason made his great opening, Dundee was required to rally in the remaining rounds to take the lead in points. To Mason's credit, there were no knockdowns in their exciting semi-final bout fought at the Garden, New York's shrine to boxing.

Mason drew with well-known American boxer James "Red" Herring in a ten-round points decision on 29 July 1930 in Utica, New York.

Mason suffered financial problems in 1931 after his former manager Joseph Morris successfully took him to court a year earlier for breach of contract, claiming that he had signed an exclusive contract to fight for him; At the time his debts were estimated at £450–500, and his assets £91.

In November 1931 he won a final eliminator against George Rose to earn another shot at the British welterweight title, but didn't get to fight for the title until June 1934, after winning an eliminator against Danny Evans.

In November 1932, he fought Ernie Rice at the Royal Albert Hall with his British and European lightweight titles at stake, winning on points over 20 rounds.

=== British welter champion again ===
He regained the British Welterweight title with a win over Len "Tiger" Smith on 11 June 1934 after an eleventh round disqualification at the Embassy Rink in Birmingham, England, the title having been vacated by Jack Hood.

A run of defeats followed, culminating in the loss of his British welterweight title to Pat Butler in a fifteen-round decision in Leicester, England on 17 December 1934. He continued to fight until 1937, losing his final fight to Jack Kid Berg. His career record included 145 wins (26 by knockout) from 215 fights.

Mason was known for his showmanship, and often played violin or recited poetry from the ring before a fight. In 1926 he appeared in vaudeville at the Holborn Empire, singing, dancing, and conducting the Miami Band.

Mason's last fight on 21 February 1937 was a third-round technical knockout loss to former world junior welterweight champion Harry "Kid" Berg at The Ring, in Southwark. Mason was down in the first round, and could not return to the ring for the fourth round bell.

=== Boxing retirement ===
Mason was engaged to Violet Hilton for a time, subsequently having a relationship with her conjoined twin sister Daisy.

Following his boxing retirement in 1937, Mason accepted an offer to manage a Hotel in South Africa, where he remained for the rest of his life. He died in South Africa on 27 August 1977 at the age of 74.
