= 1921 in sports =

1921 in sports describes the year's events in world sport.

== American football ==
- NFL championship – Chicago Staleys (later renamed the Chicago Bears; 9–1–1)
- Rose Bowl (1920 season):
  - The California Golden Bears won 21–0 over the Ohio State Buckeyes to win the college football national championship
- Cornell Big Red – college football national championship
- 8 October — the first radio broadcast of a college game takes place between West Virginia and Pittsburgh

== Association football ==
Brazil

- Cruzeiro of Belo Horizonte, officially founded on January 2.

England

- The Football League – Burnley 59 points, Manchester City 54, Bolton Wanderers 52, Liverpool 51, Newcastle United 50, Tottenham Hotspur 47
- FA Cup final – Tottenham Hotspur 1–0 Wolverhampton Wanderers at Stamford Bridge, London
- The Football League is expanded by the conversion of the Third Division (founded in 1920) into the Third Division South (D3S: 22 clubs) and the creation of the Third Division North (D3N: 20 clubs). This brings the total number of League clubs to 86. Existing league clubs in D3N are Stockport County (relegated from the Second Division) and Grimsby Town (transferred from the former Third Division). New league members in D3N are: Accrington Stanley (1921–1961), Ashington (1921–1929), Barrow (1921–1972), Chesterfield, Crewe Alexandra, Darlington, Durham City (1921–1928), Halifax Town, Hartlepool United, Lincoln City, Nelson (1921–1931), Rochdale, Southport (1921–1978), Stalybridge Celtic (1921–1923), Tranmere Rovers, Walsall, Wigan Borough (1921–1931) and Wrexham.
- Apart from Grimsby Town (now in D3N) and Crystal Palace (promoted to the Second Division), all the remaining members of the former Third Division are transferred to D3S. Two new clubs are elected to this division: Aberdare Athletic (1921–1927) and Charlton Athletic.

Germany

- National Championship – FC Nuremberg 5–0 Berliner FC Vorwärts 1890 at Düsseldorf

Republic of Ireland

- Formation of the Football Association of Ireland (FAI). It applies solely to the Republic of Ireland and is not to be confused with the Irish Football Association (IFA), which is now the organising body for football in Northern Ireland only. The split in Irish football governance is not reflected in other sports such as cricket and rugby union, in which Cricket Ireland and the Irish Rugby Football Union administer both countries.

== Athletics ==
Men's 100 metres

- Charlie Paddock (USA) breaks the world record by running a time of 10.4 at Redlands, California.

Lithuania

- Officially established Lithuanian Athletics Championships.

Monaco

- first Women's Olympiad in Monte Carlo

== Australian rules football ==
- 30 June – North Melbourne disbands in an attempt to merge with VFL club Essendon and is disqualified from the rest of the VFA season; the merger is precluded by a veto by the government of Essendon moving to Arden Street.

VFL Premiership

- Richmond wins the 25th VFL Premiership, defeating Carlton 5.6 (36) to 4.8 (32) in the Grand Final

South Australian Football League

- 7 May – Glenelg become the SAFL's eighth club when they play their first match against West Adelaide, losing 6.5 (41) to 18.10 (118).
- 8 October – Port Adelaide 4.8 (32) defeat Norwood 3.6 (24) for their ninth SAFL premiership.
- Magarey Medal won by Dan Moriarty (South Adelaide), Charlie Adams^{[a]} (Port Adelaide), John Karney^{[a]} (West Torrens) and Walter Scott^{[a]} (Norwood)

West Australian Football League

- 1 October – East Perth 5.9 (39) defeats East Fremantle 4.8 (32) to win its third consecutive premiership.
- The inaugural Sandover Medal is won by Tom Outridge, Sr. (Subiaco), and posthumously awarded retrospectively^{[b]} to Cyril Hoft (Perth).

== Bandy ==
Sweden

- Championship final – IK Sirius 5–2 IFK Uppsala (replay following 2–2 draw)

== Baseball ==
World Series

- 5–13 October — New York Giants (NL) defeats New York Yankees (AL) to win the 1921 World Series by 5 games to 3

Major League Baseball

- Babe Ruth hits 59 home runs for the New York Yankees, establishing a new single-season record for the third consecutive year

Negro leagues

- The Chicago American Giants win their second consecutive Negro National League pennant

== Boxing ==
Events

- 2 July — boxing's first “million dollar gate” occurs when Jack Dempsey meets Georges Carpentier in a “hastily assembled outdoor arena built on a farm in Jersey City, New Jersey”. A crowd of more than 80,000 attends an event billed by its promoter Tex Rickard as the "Battle of the Century". Dempsey wins by a fourth-round knockout in a scheduled 12-round fight which is also special for its radio broadcast. It is the first-ever broadcast to a "mass audience" with ringside commentary relayed over the new radiophone to hundreds of thousands of people in the northeastern United States.
- Pete “Kid” Herman regains the World Bantamweight Championship but is beaten soon afterwards by new champion Johnny Buff.

Lineal world champions

- World Heavyweight Championship – Jack Dempsey
- World Light Heavyweight Championship – Georges Carpentier
- World Middleweight Championship – Johnny Wilson
- World Welterweight Championship – Jack Britton
- World Lightweight Championship – Benny Leonard
- World Featherweight Championship – Johnny Kilbane
- World Bantamweight Championship – Joe Lynch → Pete "Kid" Herman → Johnny Buff
- World Flyweight Championship – Jimmy Wilde

== Canadian football ==
Grey Cup

- 9th Grey Cup in the Canadian Football League – Toronto Argonauts 23–0 Edmonton Eskimos

== Cricket ==
Events

- England tours Australia and becomes the first team to lose every match in a five-match Test series. In the 1921 English season, Australia emphasises the post-war superiority that it owes, in particular, to the pace duo of Jack Gregory and Ted McDonald. Having won 5–0 in Australia the previous winter, the Australians win the first three Tests of the 1921 tour and then draw the last two.

England

- County Championship – Middlesex
- Minor Counties Championship – Staffordshire
- Most runs – Phil Mead 3179 @ 69.10 (HS 280*)
- Most wickets – Alec Kennedy 186 @ 21.55 (BB 8–11)
- Wisden Cricketers of the Year – Hubert Ashton, Jack Bryan, Jack Gregory, Charlie Macartney, Ted McDonald

Australia

- Sheffield Shield – New South Wales
- Most runs – Patsy Hendren 1178 @ 62.00 (HS 271)
- Most wickets – Arthur Mailey 81 @ 22.53 (BB 9–121)

India

- Bombay Quadrangular – Hindus and Parsees (shared)

New Zealand

- Plunket Shield – Wellington

South Africa

- Currie Cup – not contested

West Indies

- Inter-Colonial Tournament – unfinished

== Cycling ==
Tour de France

- Léon Scieur (Belgium) wins the 15th Tour de France

Giro d'Italia

- Giovanni Brunero of Legnano wins the ninth Giro d'Italia

== Figure skating ==
World Figure Skating Championships

- The championships are not held in 1921

== Golf ==
Major tournaments

- Open Championship – Jock Hutchison
- US Open – Jim Barnes
- USPGA Championship – Walter Hagen

Other tournaments

- British Amateur – Willie Hunter
- US Amateur – Jesse Guilford

== Horse racing ==
England

- Grand National – Shaun Spadah
- 1,000 Guineas Stakes – Bettina
- 2,000 Guineas Stakes – Craig an Eran
- The Derby – Humorist
- The Oaks – Love in Idleness
- St. Leger Stakes – Polemarch

Australia

- Melbourne Cup – Sister Olive

Canada

- King's Plate – Herendesy

France

- Prix de l'Arc de Triomphe – Ksar

Ireland

- Irish Grand National – Bohernore
- Irish Derby Stakes – Ballyheron

USA

- Kentucky Derby – Behave Yourself
- Preakness Stakes – Broomspun
- Belmont Stakes – Grey Lag

== Ice hockey ==
Stanley Cup

- Ottawa Senators defeats Toronto St. Patricks to win the NHL championship.
- Vancouver Millionaires defeats Seattle Metropolitans in a two–game total–goal series 1–3, 6–0 (7–3) to win the PCHA championship.
- 21 March – 4 April — Ottawa Senators defeats Vancouver Millionaires in the 1921 Stanley Cup Final by 3 games to 2

== Multi-sport events ==
Far Eastern Championship Games

- Fifth Far Eastern Championship Games held in Shanghai.

Women's World Games

- The 1921 Women's Olympiad begins in Monte Carlo, first international women's sports event

== Rowing ==
The Boat Race

- 30 March — Cambridge wins the 73rd Oxford and Cambridge Boat Race

== Rugby league ==
- 1921–22 Kangaroo tour of Great Britain

England

- Championship – Hull
- Challenge Cup final – Leigh 13–0 Halifax at Wheater's Field, Broughton
- Lancashire League Championship – Wigan
- Yorkshire League Championship – Halifax
- Lancashire County Cup – Broughton Rangers 6–3 Leigh
- Yorkshire County Cup – Hull Kingston Rovers 2–0 Hull

Australia

- NSW Premiership – North Sydney (outright winner)

== Rugby union ==
Five Nations Championship

- 34th Five Nations Championship series is won by England who complete the Grand Slam

== Shooting ==
Germany

- National championship won by Mr. Janich firing an Ortgies semi-automatic pistol.

== Speed skating ==
Speed Skating World Championships

- not contested

== Tennis ==
Australia

- Australian Men's Singles Championship – Rhys Gemmell (Australia) defeats Alf Hedeman (Australia) 7–5 6–1 6–4

England

- Wimbledon Men's Singles Championship – Bill Tilden (USA) defeats Brian Norton (South Africa) 4–6 2–6 6–1 6–0 7–5
- Wimbledon Women's Singles Championship – Suzanne Lenglen (France) defeats Elizabeth Ryan (USA) 6–2, 6–0

France

- French Men's Singles Championship – Jean Samazeuilh (France) defeats André Gobert (France) 6–3 6–3 2–6 7–5
- French Women's Singles Championship – Suzanne Lenglen (France) defeats Germaine Golding (France) by a walkover

USA

- American Men's Singles Championship – Bill Tilden (USA) defeats Bill Johnston (USA) 6–1 1–6 7–5 5–7 6–3
- American Women's Singles Championship – Molla Bjurstedt Mallory (Norway) defeats Mary Browne (USA) 4–6 6–4 6–2

Davis Cup

- 1921 International Lawn Tennis Challenge – United States 5–0 Japan at West Side Tennis Club (grass) New York City, United States

== Notes ==
^{a} Awarded retrospectively by the SANFL in 1998.
^{b} By Westar Rules in 1997.
