= Joseph Lynch =

Joseph Lynch may refer to:

- Joseph Lynch (athlete) (1878–1952), British athlete
- Joseph Lynch (cricketer) (1880–1915), Irish cricketer
- Joseph Lynch (Irish politician) (died 1954), Irish Sinn Féin politician, member of the 2nd Dáil (1921–22)
- Joseph Lynch (figure skater) (born 1985), American pair skater
- Joseph Lynch (trade unionist), British trade unionist
- Joseph Henry Lynch (1911–1989), British artist
- Joseph Patrick Lynch (1872–1954), American prelate of the Roman Catholic Church
- Joseph B. Lynch (1840–1900), religious leader who founded the Christ's Sanctified Holy Church movement

== See also ==
- Joe Lynch (disambiguation)
