= Lynchite =

Lynchite may refer to:

- Follower of Joseph B. Lynch and his holiness movement
- Follower of the investment strategies of Peter Lynch
- Person prone to conducting lynching, vigilante executions
