= Joe Lynch =

Joe Lynch may refer to:

- Joe Lynch (boxer) (1898–1965), American world bantamweight champion
- Joe Lynch (actor) (1925–2001), Irish film actor
- Joe Lynch (director), American film and music video director
- Joe Lynch (Home and Away), fictional character on the Australian soap opera Home and Away
- Joe Lynch (footballer) (born 1999), English footballer

== See also ==
- Joseph Lynch (disambiguation)
