= Christ's Sanctified Holy Church =

Methodist denomination aligned with the holiness movement

- Classification: Methodism
- Orientation: Holiness movement
- Theology: Wesleyan
- Origin: 1892
- Separated from: Methodist Episcopal Church
- Congregations: 19
- Official website: sanctifiedchurch.org

Christ's Sanctified Holy Church is a Methodist denomination aligned with the holiness movement. It is based in the Southeastern United States. The group was organized on February 14, 1892, by members of the Methodist Episcopal Church on Chincoteague Island, Virginia, under the leadership of Joseph B. Lynch. Christ's Sanctified Holy Church teaches that the fullness of salvation is obtained through two works of grace: (1) the New Birth and (2) experiencing the "second blessing," i.e. entire sanctification. Christ's Sanctified Holy Church grew significantly during the first part of the 20th century as members traveled across the country preaching the doctrine of holiness (sanctification). At its early stages the movement was known as the Sanctified Band, Sanctification Band, or Lynchites.

== History ==
Christ's Sanctified Holy Church has its roots in Methodism and in the Holiness Movement illustrated, in part, by minutes of a convention on entire sanctification from 1841, and the preaching of George Watson, who also originated from the Eastern Shore. In 1887 on Chincoteague Island, Virginia, the members of Goodwill Methodist Episcopal Church held fast to the belief that they, though living in a state of forgiveness before God, could not be saved without sanctification. Through reading the Bible and through prayer, they sought and obtained this second blessing of entire sanctification. They started to proclaim this message to others in their church and community. In 1892, after their petition to the Methodist Episcopal Church requesting a holy minister was rejected, they organized themselves into Christ's Sanctified Holy Church. Joseph B. Lynch, their earliest leader, was "the first person on the Eastern shore of Virginia to embrace the Holiness doctrines that so divided American Methodism at the end of the 19th century" and Christ's Sanctified Holy Church is the "oldest Holiness congregation on the Virginia peninsula". There was no way the Chincoteague residents of the day could have known it, but Lynch "and his followers were not unique in their beliefs and practices", as Holiness revivals begin in the United States in the last half of the nineteenth century.

The message of Holiness was strong, convicting, and forced a decision in those who heard the doctrine. It seems those outside of the community were more than ready to believe scandalous accusations. Where the community preached that sanctification would remove the desire for sinful acts, some observers took that to mean that acts that would normally be sinful are not sinful to the sanctified. A former member of the movement was killed by local vigilantes from a 'stray bullet'. Those who committed that act never paid for that crime as the community came to their defense, but, later, leaders of the band, Lynch, Collins, and two other men were arrested, and jailed and fined by the authorities. According to Rev. Kirk Mariner, a retired United Methodist minister, writer and historian, their "crime being by today's standard, nothing more than the practice and promotion of religious beliefs that run counter to the current community standards". Today the church "enjoys peace and acceptance among the islanders and its members, like those of the sect in general, are now held in respect throughout the community".

The belief that compelled the split from the Methodist Episcopal Church sometimes affected families and the community. Undoubtedly there were occasions where a husband or wife wanted to join the Sanctified Band, becoming a traveling evangelist and the other did not. Indeed, they moved frequently, seeking fertile fields for preaching, avoiding persecution, and trying to make a financial living. Some family separations likely resulted from decisions to move with them, perhaps others were of personal convenience and contrary to the teachings of the community. Some of the earliest Doctrine and Discipline documents from 1897 state, with respect to the topic of divorce and remarriage, that "No brother or sister shall leave his wife or her husband except it be for fornication and adultery". Nevertheless, there were examples where a husband or wife left along with the Sanctified band from the original founding through the evangelical period.

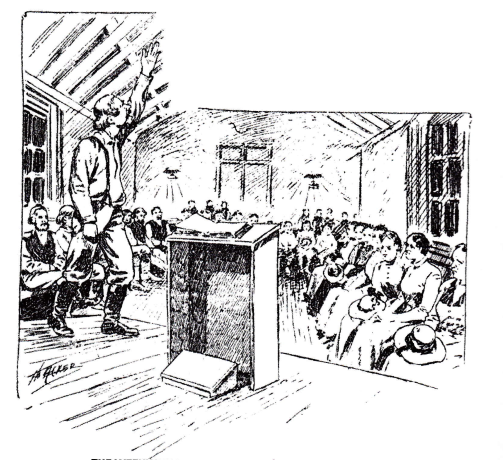
A sketch of a weekly prayer meeting

Even amid the persecution, many recognized the sincerity. In the summer of 1894, a writer from the New York Recorder heard about the group that was preaching that a person could live a life free from sin and be holy. The writer was convinced they were "perfectly sincere": "Every face bore the stamp of perfect contentment with a full-souled peace and spiritual happiness that shined in their faces".

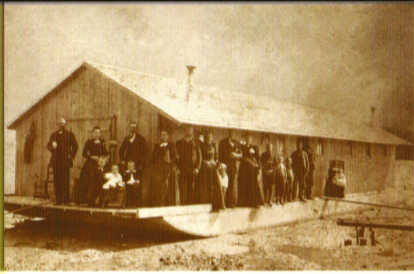
Example of the Houseboats used by the community

Seeking those receptive to their message and fleeing the persecution, the group migrated from Chincoteague, drawing attention for its unusual practices of living in houseboats.

Through their evangelistic efforts, their message immediately spread to neighboring communities on the eastern shore of Virginia, Delaware, and Maryland. Others believed and were sanctified. The traveling band was generally becoming well received in many communities, but did face numerous challenges. In 1895, a group of people from Christ's Sanctified Holy Church left the eastern shore of Virginia and Delaware to begin an evangelistic effort to spread the message of sanctification.

In February 1897 a local newspaper in Oregon, NC published an interesting account. "They held many meetings – almost daily.... Some 150 persons have professed a belief in their doctrines of sanctification... Whilst many good men are opposing them, very many of the best citizens in the section where they have chiefly operated say they have done a great good". An approximately 60 year old experienced local minister from a larger denomination challenged them to a joint debate on scripture subjects on Tuesday January 20, 1897. Mrs. Sarah E. Collins, a 26 year old co-leader was reported to be "thoroughly posted as to the doctrines she advocates and seems to know the entire Bible by heart". The report continues that "space will not allow us to give a report of the discussions, but we feel warranted in saying that Reverend Davenport will not want to renew the discussions, and that at least nine out of 10 who heard the debate would give the victory to the woman".

Perhaps events were embellished with international coverage, as a paper in New Zealand carried a story repeated by the Oxford Observer. The paper reported that, fleeing persecution in Chowan County North Carolina, they loaded onto their houseboats and moved them about 50 yards out into the water. Some time later, with bullets ripping through the sides of their houseboats they started singing. "Raucous cries, curses and threats were heard from the river bank", but from the Sanctified houseboats only "a wail of prayer and weeping" as Patty Watkins lost her life to a bullet. The paper goes on to report "Yet not a word was said in bitterness against those who had killed her".

Though blogs were posted online as recently as 2012, a more thorough treatment of the context and historical events appears in these references.

Some examples provide insight into Christ's Sanctified Holy Church. From the beginning it was asserted that there would be no salaries for ministers of the church; there would be no money-raising methods, collections or festivals in the church. They teach that everyone (both men and women) who was sanctified had the freedom to preach, testify and sing as the Holy Spirit moved on them (though leaders often stopped anyone talking over 15 minutes). They stand in a group, singing, clapping hands and shouting as the Holy Spirit moves on them with no musical instruments. During World War I, the church encouraged its members to seek jobs in the shipyards to avoid conscription, as their beliefs prohibited military service.

Their initial travels extended from Maryland to North Carolina and by the end of the decade, to South Carolina, Georgia, and Florida. Others were sanctified and joined in the evangelistic efforts. By 1905, meetings were held in cities of Alabama, Mississippi, Louisiana, Texas, Oklahoma, Kansas, Missouri, and the western states of Colorado and California. Others were sanctified and joined in the evangelistic efforts. By 1905, meetings were held in cities of Alabama, Mississippi, Louisiana, Texas, Oklahoma, Kansas, Missouri, and the western states of Colorado and California.

As the church grew, other groups formed and carried on the evangelistic efforts to many other places in the United States. These travels continued on a broad scale for the first half of the twentieth century. After that time, permanent churches were established by the believers in all of the states of the southeastern United States.

In the summer of 1938 efforts begin to establish a Camp ground where the traveling Sanctified bands could meet once a year to spend a week or two together and where older members could retire. Today that Campground exists near Perry, GA centered around an updated sanctuary dedicated in 2004. Annual Camp meetings are held there starting the Saturday night before the third Sunday in July.

Rather than traveling bands convening there, today most of the faithful come there from the established active churches.

== Established churches ==
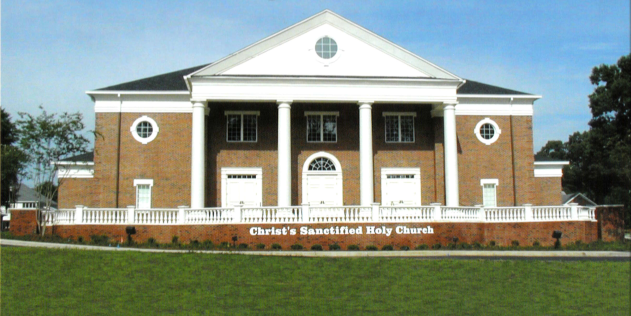
Christ's Sanctified Holy Church Camp Ground Church

Established churches as-of 2015:

- Jemison, AL
- Omar, DE
- Jacksonville, FL
- Leesburg/Albany, GA
- Between/Atlanta, GA
- Perry, GA (location of the campground)
- Columbia County / Augusta, GA
- Houma, LA
- Terry, MS
- Belvidere, NC
- Greensboro, NC
- Old Trap, NC
- Piney Woods, NC
- Raleigh, NC
- Wilmington, NC
- Columbia, SC
- Hanahan/Charleston, SC
- Chesapeake, VA
- Chincoteague, VA

== Beliefs ==
The church teaches that salvation is a two-step process consisting of conversion (repentance and forgiveness of sins) and sanctification (the indwelling of the Holy Spirit) which cleanses the believer from all sin. Believers are then expected to live clean, holy lives. Other doctrines include the inspiration of the Scriptures, the deity of Christ, and the existence of a literal heaven and hell. It is the practice of the CSHC to use the King James Version of the Bible. Singing is a cappella, with spontaneous preaching and prayer. The church is firmly within the Wesleyan-Arminian tradition. Salvation is considered an act of free will on the part of the believer. Women may preach and teach in the assembly. It does not pass around a collection plate, or ask for offerings during a church service. In addition, no clergy position or ministry worker is ever given monetary compensation for their work, as this work is assumed to be voluntary and without pay.

The church was a product of the "anti-ordinance" controversy that arose within the holiness movement during the 1890s. Lynch and others believed that the traditional ordinances of the church – namely, water baptism, Communion, and footwashing – were no longer necessary for believers. The church takes literally the words in Ephesians 4:5, "One Lord, one faith, one baptism", believing the "one baptism" for believers to be the baptism of the Holy Spirit. The doctrine of physical resurrection of the dead was also rejected in favor of a spiritual resurrection taking place at sanctification. This places the church within the Preterist fold eschatologically.

Christ's Sanctified Holy Church falls under the category of 'Holiness Pacifists' as the denomination teaches that its members should have "no part" in war, but rather "endorse the peace treaty, and believe that all controversies and difficulties between nations should be settled by counsel and arbitration."

== Present activities ==
The church maintains a cemetery and campground in Perry, Georgia, and hosts an annual camp meeting during the month of July. The church also operates a home for the elderly. Membership today is largely confined to seventeen congregations located in Virginia, Delaware, North Carolina, South Carolina, Georgia, Florida, Alabama, Mississippi, and Louisiana.

== Related movements ==
In the late 1800s members of the movement fled Chincoteague after violent attacks due to their heterodox beliefs. In 1904 several members of the movement arrived in Calcasieu Parish, Louisiana, and worked with African American Methodists there. This inspired the 1904 formation of the Christ's Sanctified Holy Church Colored. The group later dropped the "Colored" from their name, but maintained a separate existence from the main CSHC body. Today it is called Christ Holy Sanctified Church and headquartered in Texas.
