= Pete Herman =

American-Italian boxer (1896–1973)

Personal information
- Nickname: Kid Herman
- Nationality: (United States) American
- Born: Peter Gulotta; February 12, 1896 Convent, Louisiana, U.S.
- Died: April 13, 1973 (aged 77) New Orleans, Louisiana, U.S.
- Height: 5 ft 2 in (1.57 m)
- Weight: Bantamweight

Boxing career
- Stance: Orthodox

Boxing record
- Total fights: 145
- Wins: 100
- Win by KO: 20
- Losses: 32
- Draws: 13

Pete Herman (February 12, 1896 – April 13, 1973) was one of the all-time great bantamweight world champions. An American of Italian heritage and descent, Herman was born Peter Gulotta in New Orleans, Louisiana, and fought from 1912 until 1927. He retired with a record of 69 wins (19 by KO), 11 losses, 8 draws and 61 no-decisions in 149 bouts. His managers were Jerome Gargano, Doc Cutch, Sammy Goldman and Red Walsh. Nat Fleisher, Ring Magazine editor and founder, impressively rated Herman as the #2 best all time bantamweight.

== Early life ==
Herman was born Peter Gulotta on February 12, 1896 in Convent, Louisiana, to Sicilian immigrant parents from Corleone, Italy. His father, Calogero Gulotta, worked unloading bananas from freighters along the Mississippi River.

Raised in a working-class Italian-American family, Herman spent much of his childhood in New Orleans, leaving school after the eighth grade to help support his family. He worked as a shoeshine boy and later as a bellhop, often earning more than his father. Herman’s interest in boxing began while reading the Police Gazette at the barbershop where he shined shoes. He started sparring with local fighters and adopted the ring name “Pete Herman” to conceal his boxing activities from his father.

== Boxing career ==
Herman fought his first professional fight around 1912 at age 16. According to boxing lore, Herman earned some of his living as a "bootblack" or shoe shine before making it as a boxer. Two years after his first bout, he held his own during a 10-round, no-decision bout against World bantamweight champion Kid Williams on June 20, 1914, at the Pelican Stadium in New Orleans, though losing the bout in the opinion of the local Times-Picayune.

Herman was a smooth boxer and great body puncher, particularly skilled at inside fighting. He defeated San Franciscan Eddie Campi on September 13, 1914, in a twenty-round points decision in New Orleans.

In his first eighteen bouts, between September 1912 and July 1913, his only loss was to Johnny Fisse on points. He later drew on his loss to Fisse on September 29, 1913, fighting him again in Memphis, Tennessee, and making Fisse his most frequent career opponent.

=== Bouts with Eddie Coulon ===
On December 13, 1915, Herman defeated fellow New Orleans boxer Eddie Coulon in a fourth-round knockout in New Orleans. Both boxers weighed 116 pounds, but Coulon had a 3 1/2-inch reach advantage. Herman had faced Coulon twice in his early career on September 30, and October 21, 1912, in two six-round draws in New Orleans. He defeated Coulon on September 1, 1913, in Memphis, Tennessee, in an eight-round points decision.

Herman lost to the great New York Jewish boxer Lew Tendler on February 28, 1916, at the Olympia Club in Philadelphia in a six-round newspaper decision. Tendler would later meet the greatest boxers of his era including the lightweight champion Benny Leonard in several bouts.

On June 12, 1916, he defeated Frankie Brown, New York bantamweight, in New Orleans in a fifteen-round points decision. He had drawn with Brown three months earlier in Baltimore in another fifteen round bout.

=== World Bantamweight Champion, 1917 ===
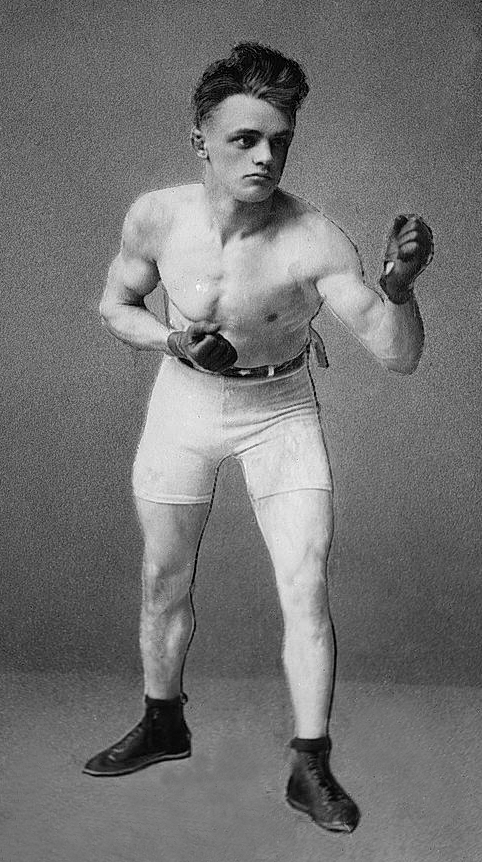
Kid Williams, World Bantamweight Champion Contender

In their fourth meeting, Herman finally won the title from Kid Williams on January 9, 1917, in a twenty-round points decision in New Orleans, even though Williams was allowed to pick his own referee for the match, Bill Rocap. Herman scored knockdowns in the fifth and twelfth. Though Williams was the aggressor throughout the fight, Herman had little trouble dodging the former champion's blows. Due to Williams' aggressive style of boxing in the bout, many ringside believed he had won more of the rounds than Herman.

=== Knocking out Johnny Coulon ===
On May 14, 1917, Herman defeated Johnny Coulon in a third-round technical knockout at Lakeside Auditorium in Racine, Wisconsin. Halfway through the third, Coulon was down for a count of nine from a right swing to the jaw by Herman, not long after coming out of a clinch. After Coulon rose, the referee stopped the fight, as Coulon still seemed woozy. Herman had a nine-pound weight advantage, and a two-inch reach advantage. Coulon was seven years older at twenty-eight, which may have made a difference in the fight. Coulon had formerly held and lost the World Bantamweight Title.

=== Bantamweight champion ===
==== Marriage to Annie LeBlanc, November 1917 ====
On the evening of November 4, 1917, Herman was married to Annie LeBlanc, whom he had known since he was a child in New Orleans. The following day Herman defeated Frankie Burns in a twenty-round points decision at Louisiana Auditorium in New Orleans in what a few sources considered a title bout. Herman was scheduled to have reported for service in the US Army after the bout. Herman did not have great difficulty amassing enough points to win the bout. Burns had a difficult time in the first three rounds and was staggered by Herman in the second. Burns may have evened the fighting in the seventeenth round.

Herman previously suffered a thirteenth-round technical knockout from burns in November 1914 in the same city. Herman did not box from late December until May 1918, and may have been in military training. In March 1918, the US Navy refused Herman furloughs to box until he had achieved three months of active duty.

On December 14, 1917, Herman won with a third-round technical knockout against Frankie Mason, in Fort Wayne, Indiana. In the second round, Mason was knocked to the canvas for the first time in his career.

On May 23, 1919, he defeated Johnny "Kewpie" Ertle in Minneapolis, in a fifth-round technical knockout. The deciding blow was a strong left to the jaw. Ertle had previously been down for a count of eight in the fourth, but was saved by the bell.

He defeated Chicago bantamweight Johnny Ritchie on January 7, 1920, in an eighth-round technical knockout at Tulane Stadium in New Orleans. After a knockdown in the eighth, Ritchie arose still staggering, and the fight was stopped by the referee. Herman had won the bout with ease.

== Loss of Bantamweight title ==
In the late evening of December 22, 1920, Herman lost his bantamweight title in Madison Square Garden to Joe Lynch in a fifteen-round unanimous decision. In a decisive bout, the El Paso Herald gave Lynch ten rounds with four for Herman. Lynch used to advantage his superior height and a four-inch advantage in reach. Only a day after the bout, Herman sailed for London to face Jimmy Wilde.

== Bout with Jimmy Wilde ==
Herman's most memorable match was fought against Jimmy Wilde, the legendary Welsh Flyweight World Champion.

The Wilde-Herman fight was staged on January 13, 1921, at Royal Albert Hall in London, and resulted in a seventeenth-round technical knockout for Herman. The former bantamweight champion used his weight advantage and body punching to wear down Wilde, the still reigning Flyweight champ. Herman hurt Wilde in the 15th when the fighting was fierce against the ropes, and knocked him through the ropes three times in the 17th round to end the fight. The classy Wilde made no excuses. He stated after the fight "I can sincerely say that Herman beat me because he was the better boxer." Many gave Wilde the first five rounds, but Herman came back particularly strong in the fifteenth, until he ended the bout in the seventeenth. The exciting match brought an impressive crowd of around 10,000, including the Prince of Wales.

On July 11, 1921, Herman defeated British Bantamweight Champion Jim Higgins in an eleventh-round knockout at the Highland Park Ring in London. Herman won every round but the eighth, when Higgins delivered a blow to the chin of Herman. Herman took the match with a right hook to the jaw of Higgins, after which, according to one source, Higgins was down for a full five minutes. Most of the bout was described as in-fighting.

== Regaining Bantamweight title ==
On July 25, 1921, Herman fought Joe Lynch in a rematch for the World bantamweight title in New York's storied Ebbets Field. Both boxers weighed in at 116 3/4 pounds. The Scranton Republican and other sources gave Herman 13 of the 15 rounds, with only the eleventh to Lynch and the second even. Herman's decisive win on points fueled speculation that he had thrown the first fight. Herman forced the fighting, taking the lead from the opening bell using both left and right effectively. At the time, Herman was one of the few fighters ever to regain a lost title.

On September 5, 1921, Herman defeated French boxer Charles LeDoux at Louisiana Stadium in New Orleans in a tenth-round newspaper decision. According to multiple sources, Herman had a shade better of the no-decision bout, particularly among the local sportswriters.

=== Loss of second Bantamweight title ===
He lost the World Bantamweight Championship for the second time on September 23, 1921, when he was outpointed by Johnny Buff in a fifteen-round title match at Madison Square Garden. Buff took ten rounds employing lightning speed, with only four rounds for his opponent. Herman put Buff on the canvas only once very briefly in the fourth round with a right to the jaw. For most of the bout, Herman had trouble using his often powerful right effectively. By the fifteenth round Buff was able to freely reign most of his blows on Herman. Having a very slight advantage in reach, and a four-pound weight disadvantage, Buff won on points by a sizable margin. Buff was fighting at nearly thirty while Herman was only 25. Buff had taken the American Flyweight Championship previously.

== Losing vision ==
Herman had begun losing sight in one eye, and he claimed to have been nearly blind in that eye by April 1921, well before he fought Buff. He fought five more times, knocking out number one contender Packy O'Gatty in one round at the Rink Sporting Club in Brooklyn, on December 9, 1921. O'Gatty went down two minutes and fourteen seconds into the first round from an overhand right to the jaw. Herman previously landed a strong right uppercut to the jaw of O'Gatty that had rattled him earlier in the round. The crowd at the Rink Club in Brooklyn was not large, filling only about half the seats. Herman claimed after the bout he hoped to get a title match again with Johnny Buff, but that Buff would not consent to meet him. Considering Herman's impending loss of vision, his retirement was probably a wise choice.

Herman retired in 1922 after winning a ten-round bout on points with Roy Moore in Boston on April 24.

== Life after boxing ==
According to one source, Herman's investments were made wisely on the advice of a friend, B. S. D'Antoni, though Herman retired before the great depression. His earnings in 1921 were estimated at $200,000.

He eventually became completely blind. After his retirement from the ring, he owned and operated a club in the New Orleans French Quarter. Pete Herman's was a popular New Orleans landmark. He was appointed to an honorary position with the New Orleans Boxing Commission in the 1920s. He appeared as himself in one movie, New Orleans Uncensored.

On April 13, 1973, Herman died in a New Orleans hospital after failing health and a fall that broke his hip the previous month. Funeral services were held on April 16.

Herman was elected into the Boxing Hall of Fame in 1959. He was inducted into the International Boxing Hall of Fame in 1997. He was also a member of the Louisiana and New Orleans Sports Hall of Fame.

== Professional boxing record ==
All information in this section is derived from BoxRec, unless otherwise stated.

=== Official record ===
145 fights	61 wins	13 losses
By knockout	20	1
By decision	41	11
By disqualification	0	1
Draws	9	
Newspaper decisions/draws	62	

All newspaper decisions are officially regarded as “no decision” bouts and are not counted in the win/loss/draw column.

No.	Result	Record	Opponent	Type	Round	Date	Location	Notes
145	Win	61–13–9 (62)	Roy Moore	PTS	10	Apr 24, 1922	Arena, Boston, Massachusetts, U.S.	
144	Win	60–13–9 (62)	Babe Asher	TKO	7 (15)	Feb 20, 1922	Tulane Arena, New Orleans, Louisiana, U.S.	
143	Loss	59–13–9 (62)	Midget Smith	PTS	15	Dec 22, 1921	Madison Square Garden, Manhattan, New York City, New York, U.S.	
142	Win	59–12–9 (62)	Abe Friedman	PTS	10	Dec 13, 1921	Mechanics Building, Boston, Massachusetts, U.S.	
141	Win	58–12–9 (62)	Packey O'Gatty	KO	1 (10)	Dec 9, 1921	Clermont Avenue Rink, Brooklyn, New York City, New York, U.S.	
140	Win	57–12–9 (62)	Roy Moore	PTS	15	Nov 12, 1921	Clermont Avenue Rink, Brooklyn, New York City, New York, U.S.	
139	Loss	56–12–9 (62)	Johnny Buff	PTS	15	Sep 23, 1921	Madison Square Garden, Manhattan, New York City, New York, U.S.	Lost NYSAC and NBA bantamweight titles
138	Win	56–11–9 (62)	Charles Ledoux	NWS	10	Sep 5, 1921	Louisiana Auditorium, New Orleans, Louisiana, U.S.	
137	Win	56–11–9 (61)	Joe Lynch	PTS	15	Jul 25, 1921	Ebbets Field, Brooklyn, New York City, New York, U.S.	Won NYSAC and NBA bantamweight titles
136	Win	55–11–9 (61)	Jim Higgins	KO	11 (20)	Jul 11, 1921	Holland Park Rink, Kensington, London, England, U.K.	
135	Loss	54–11–9 (61)	Young Montreal	UD	10	May 27, 1921	Braves Field, Boston, Massachusetts, U.S.	
134	Win	54–10–9 (61)	Frankie Daly	PTS	15	Apr 29, 1921	Pilsbury Winter Gardens, New Orleans, Louisiana, U.S.	
133	Loss	53–10–9 (61)	Young Montreal	PTS	10	Apr 15, 1921	Arena, Boston, Massachusetts, U.S.	
132	Win	53–9–9 (61)	Barney Snyder	TKO	5 (10)	Apr 7, 1921	Service Men's AC, Worcester, Massachusetts, U.S.	
131	Win	52–9–9 (61)	Johnny Solzberg	TKO	7 (12)	Apr 4, 1921	Auditorium, Freeport, New York, U.S.	
130	Win	51–9–9 (61)	Willie Spencer	TKO	12 (15)	Mar 30, 1921	Pioneer Sporting Club, Manhattan, New York City, New York, U.S.	
129	Win	50–9–9 (61)	George Adams	TKO	1 (15)	Mar 24, 1921	Manhattan Casino, Manhattan, New York City, New York, U.S.	
128	Win	49–9–9 (61)	Jimmy Wilde	TKO	17 (20)	Jan 13, 1921	Royal Albert Hall, Kensington, London, England, U.K.	
127	Loss	48–9–9 (61)	Joe Lynch	UD	15	Dec 22, 1920	Madison Square Garden, Manhattan, New York City, New York, U.S.	Lost NYSAC bantamweight title
126	Win	48–8–9 (61)	Jimmy Kelly	NWS	10	Sep 21, 1920	Beardstown, Illinois, U.S.	
125	Loss	48–8–9 (60)	Jackie Sharkey	NWS	10	Sep 11, 1920	Oswego Arena, East Chicago, Indiana, U.S.	
124	Loss	48–8–9 (59)	Joe Burman	NWS	8	Sep 6, 1920	Coliseum, Saint Louis, Missouri, U.S.	
123	Win	48–8–9 (58)	Georgie Lee	NWS	10	Sep 4, 1920	Tulane Arena, New Orleans, Louisiana, U.S.	
122	Win	48–8–9 (57)	Roy Moore	NWS	10	Aug 19, 1920	Colorado Springs, Colorado, U.S.	
121	Win	48–8–9 (56)	Roy Moore	NWS	8	May 19, 1920	Ice Palace, Philadelphia, Pennsylvania, U.S.	
120	Win	48–8–9 (55)	William Henry Vincent	NWS	8	May 10, 1920	Olympia A.C., Philadelphia, Pennsylvania, U.S.	
119	Win	48–8–9 (54)	Paul Demers	PTS	10	Apr 19, 1920	Arena A.A., New Bedford, Massachusetts, U.S.	
118	Win	47–8–9 (54)	Joe O'Donnell	NWS	8	Mar 31, 1920	Armory, Camden, New Jersey, U.S.	
117	Win	47–8–9 (53)	Patsy Johnson	NWS	8	Mar 25, 1920	4th Regiment Armory, Jersey City, New Jersey, U.S.	
116	Win	47–8–9 (52)	Lew Angelo	TKO	8 (8)	Mar 19, 1920	Armory, Paterson, New Jersey, U.S.	
115	Draw	46–8–9 (52)	Earl Puryear	NWS	8	Mar 1, 1920	Grand Theatre, Trenton A.C., Trenton, New Jersey, U.S.	
114	Win	46–8–9 (51)	Johnny Solzberg	NWS	8	Feb 10, 1920	Coliseum, Saint Louis, Missouri, U.S.	
113	Win	46–8–9 (50)	Johnny Ritchie	TKO	8 (15)	Jan 7, 1920	Tulane Arena, New Orleans, Louisiana, U.S.	
112	Win	45–8–9 (50)	Kid Regan	TKO	3 (8)	Dec 4, 1919	Coliseum, Saint Louis, Missouri, U.S.	Retained world bantamweight title
111	Win	44–8–9 (50)	Patsy Johnson	NWS	6	Dec 1, 1919	Olympia A.C., Philadelphia, Pennsylvania, U.S.	
110	Win	44–8–9 (49)	Mickey Russell	NWS	8	Nov 27, 1919	Grand View Auditorium, Jersey City, New Jersey, U.S.	
109	Draw	44–8–9 (48)	Johnny Buff	NWS	8	Nov 24, 1919	Grand Theatre, Trenton, New Jersey, U.S.	
108	Win	44–8–9 (47)	Joe Lynch	NWS	6	Nov 12, 1919	Olympia A.C., Philadelphia, Pennsylvania, U.S.	
107	Win	44–8–9 (46)	Harold Farese	NWS	8	Oct 13, 1919	1st Regiment Armory, Newark, New Jersey, U.S.	
106	Loss	44–8–9 (45)	Sammy Sandow	NWS	10	Sep 30, 1919	Kentucky National A.C. Tent, Newport, Kentucky, U.S.	
105	Loss	44–8–9 (44)	Jackie Sharkey	NWS	10	Sep 15, 1919	Roller Palace Rink, Detroit, Michigan, U.S.	World bantamweight title at stake; (via KO only)
104	Loss	44–8–9 (43)	Joe Lynch	NWS	10	Sep 1, 1919	Driveway Park, Waterbury, Connecticut, U.S.	
103	Loss	44–8–9 (42)	Jackie Sharkey	NWS	10	Aug 15, 1919	Auditorium, Milwaukee, Wisconsin, U.S.	World bantamweight title at stake; (via KO only)
102	Loss	44–8–9 (41)	Bernie Hahn	NWS	10	Aug 6, 1919	Armory Auditorium, Atlanta, Georgia, U.S.	
101	Draw	44–8–9 (40)	Dick Griffin	NWS	10	Jul 4, 1919	Fort Worth, Texas, U.S.	
100	Loss	44–8–9 (39)	Terry McHugh	NWS	10	Jun 9, 1919	Allentown, Pennsylvania, U.S.	World bantamweight title at stake; (via KO only)
99	Win	44–8–9 (38)	Kid Regan	NWS	8	May 29, 1919	Coliseum, Saint Louis, Missouri, U.S.	
98	Win	44–8–9 (37)	Johnny Ertle	TKO	5 (10)	May 23, 1919	Kenwood Armory, Minneapolis, Minnesota, U.S.	Retained world bantamweight title
97	Win	43–8–9 (37)	Johnny Solzberg	NWS	10	May 12, 1919	Arena, Syracuse, New York, U.S.	World bantamweight title at stake; (via KO only)
96	Win	43–8–9 (36)	Patsy Wallace	NWS	6	May 3, 1919	National A.C., Philadelphia, Pennsylvania, U.S.	World bantamweight title at stake; (via KO only)
95	Loss	43–8–9 (35)	Kid Regan	NWS	8	Apr 25, 1919	Coliseum, Saint Louis, Missouri, U.S.	
94	Win	43–8–9 (34)	Patsy Johnson	NWS	8	Apr 21, 1919	Grand Theater, Trenton, New Jersey, U.S.	
93	Loss	43–8–9 (33)	Al Shubert	NWS	10	Apr 8, 1919	Lyric Theater, Baltimore, Maryland, U.S.	
92	Loss	43–8–9 (32)	Memphis Pal Moore	NWS	8	Mar 24, 1919	New Lyric Theater, Memphis, Tennessee, U.S.	
91	Draw	43–8–9 (31)	Johnny Rosner	PTS	10	Mar 14, 1919	Long Island, New York, U.S.	
90	Loss	43–8–8 (31)	Al Shubert	NWS	10	Mar 10, 1919	New Bedford, Massachusetts, U.S.	
89	Loss	43–8–8 (30)	Jack "Kid" Wolfe	NWS	10	Mar 4, 1919	Gray's Armory, Cleveland, Ohio, U.S.	
88	Win	43–8–8 (29)	Patsy Scanlon	NWS	10	Feb 10, 1919	Duquesne Garden, Pittsburgh, Pennsylvania, U.S.	
87	Win	43–8–8 (28)	Young Zulu Kid	NWS	8	Sep 6, 1918	International League Ballpark, Jersey City, New Jersey, U.S.	
86	Win	43–8–8 (27)	Jackie Sharkey	NWS	6	Sep 2, 1918	Olympia A.C., Philadelphia, Pennsylvania, U.S.	
85	Loss	43–8–8 (26)	Frankie Burns	NWS	8	Jul 4, 1918	International League Ballpark, Jersey City, New Jersey, U.S.	
84	Win	43–8–8 (25)	Nate Jackson	PTS	10	Jun 22, 1918	Louisiana Auditorium, New Orleans, Louisiana, U.S.	
83	Loss	42–8–8 (25)	Andy Chaney	NWS	10	May 8, 1918	Lyric Theater, Baltimore, Maryland, U.S.	
82	Win	42–8–8 (24)	Jackie Sharkey	NWS	6	May 4, 1918	National A.C., Philadelphia, Pennsylvania, U.S.	
81	Draw	42–8–8 (23)	Gussie Lewis	NWS	6	Dec 19, 1917	National A.C., Philadelphia, Pennsylvania, U.S.	
80	Win	42–8–8 (22)	Frankie Mason	TKO	3 (10)	Dec 14, 1917	Majestic Theatre, Fort Wayne, Indiana, U.S.	
79	Win	41–8–8 (22)	Joe Tuber	NWS	6	Dec 10, 1917	Olympia A.C., Philadelphia, Pennsylvania, U.S.	
78	Win	41–8–8 (21)	Frankie Burns	PTS	20	Nov 5, 1917	Louisiana Auditorium, New Orleans, Louisiana, U.S.	Retained NYSAC bantamweight title
77	Win	40–8–8 (21)	Johnny Eggers	NWS	6	Sep 17, 1917	Olympia A.C., Philadelphia, Pennsylvania, U.S.	
76	Win	40–8–8 (20)	Earl Puryear	NWS	10	Sep 10, 1917	Baseball Park, Tulsa, Oklahoma, U.S.	
75	Win	40–8–8 (19)	Nate Jackson	NWS	10	Sep 3, 1917	Baseball Park, Tulsa, Oklahoma, U.S.	
74	Win	40–8–8 (18)	Jack Douglas	PTS	10	Aug 21, 1917	Tulane Arena, New Orleans, Louisiana, U.S.	
73	Win	39–8–8 (18)	Kid Williams	NWS	6	Jun 13, 1917	Olympia A.C., Philadelphia, Pennsylvania, U.S.	
72	Win	39–8–8 (17)	Joe Lynch	NWS	10	Jun 1, 1917	Pioneer Sporting Club, Manhattan, New York City, New York, U.S.	
71	Win	39–8–8 (16)	Gussie Lewis	NWS	6	May 21, 1917	Olympia A.C., Philadelphia, Pennsylvania, U.S.	
70	Win	39–8–8 (15)	Johnny Coulon	TKO	3 (10)	May 14, 1917	Lakeside Auditorium, Racine, Wisconsin, U.S.	
69	Win	38–8–8 (15)	Harry Coulin	NWS	10	May 3, 1917	Broadway Auditorium, Buffalo, New York, U.S.	
68	Win	38–8–8 (14)	Pekin Kid Herman	NWS	10	Apr 27, 1917	Peoria, Illinois, U.S.	
67	Win	38–8–8 (13)	Dutch Brandt	NWS	10	Mar 13, 1917	Broadway S.C., Brooklyn, New York City, New York, U.S.	
66	Win	38–8–8 (12)	William Henry Vincent	NWS	10	Mar 6, 1917	German Hall, Albany, New York, U.S.	
65	Win	38–8–8 (11)	Harry Kabakoff	NWS	10	Feb 20, 1917	Coliseum, Saint Louis, Missouri, U.S.	
64	Win	38–8–8 (10)	Sammy Sandow	NWS	10	Feb 12, 1917	Heuck's Opera House, Cincinnati, Ohio, U.S.	
63	Win	38–8–8 (9)	Kid Williams	PTS	20	Jan 9, 1917	Louisiana Auditorium, New Orleans, Louisiana, U.S.	Won NYSAC bantamweight title
62	Win	37–8–8 (9)	Leo Schneider	PTS	8	Dec 11, 1916	Phoenix A.C., Memphis, Tennessee, U.S.	
61	Win	36–8–8 (9)	Johnny Eggers	PTS	20	Nov 6, 1916	Louisiana Auditorium, New Orleans, Louisiana, U.S.	
60	Win	35–8–8 (9)	Bernie Hahn	NWS	6	Sep 30, 1916	National A.C., Philadelphia, Pennsylvania, U.S.	
59	Win	35–8–8 (8)	Jimmy Pappas	PTS	10	Sep 4, 1916	Armory Auditorium, Atlanta, Georgia, U.S.	
58	Win	34–8–8 (8)	Roy Moore	PTS	15	Jul 31, 1916	Orleans A.C., New Orleans, Louisiana, U.S.	
57	Win	33–8–8 (8)	George Brown	KO	5 (8)	Jul 10, 1916	Phoenix A.C., Memphis, Tennessee, U.S.	
56	Win	32–8–8 (8)	Frankie Brown	PTS	15	Jun 12, 1916	Orleans A.C., New Orleans, Louisiana, U.S.	
55	Draw	31–8–8 (8)	Frankie Brown	PTS	15	Mar 24, 1916	Albaugh's Theater, Baltimore, Maryland, U.S.	
54	Loss	31–8–7 (8)	Lew Tendler	NWS	6	Feb 28, 1916	Olympia A.C., Philadelphia, Pennsylvania, U.S.	
53	Draw	31–8–7 (7)	Kid Williams	PTS	20	Feb 7, 1916	Louisiana Auditorium, New Orleans, Louisiana, U.S.	For NYSAC bantamweight title
52	Win	31–8–6 (7)	Eddie Coulon	KO	4 (15)	Dec 13, 1915	Orleans A.C., New Orleans, Louisiana, U.S.	
51	Win	30–8–6 (7)	Young Zulu Kid	PTS	15	Nov 29, 1915	Orleans A.C., New Orleans, Louisiana, U.S.	
50	Loss	29–8–6 (7)	Memphis Pal Moore	PTS	8	Nov 15, 1915	Phoenix A.C., Memphis, Tennessee, U.S.	
49	Win	29–7–6 (7)	Sammy Sandow	PTS	15	Oct 6, 1915	Tommy Burns Arena, New Orleans, Louisiana, U.S.	
48	Win	28–7–6 (7)	Nate Jackson	PTS	15	Sep 13, 1915	Denver, Colorado, U.S.	
47	Loss	27–7–6 (7)	Nate Jackson	DQ	3 (15)	Sep 6, 1915	National A.C., Denver, Colorado, U.S.	
46	Win	27–6–6 (7)	Jack Doyle	PTS	15	Jul 21, 1915	Tulane Arena, New Orleans, Louisiana, U.S.	
45	Win	26–6–6 (7)	Louisiana	PTS	20	Jul 2, 1915	Tulane Arena, New Orleans, Louisiana, U.S.	
44	Win	25–6–6 (7)	Harry Bramer	KO	4 (15)	Jun 18, 1915	Denver, Colorado, U.S.	
43	Win	24–6–6 (7)	Al Shubert	PTS	15	May 18, 1915	Tommy Burns Arena, New Orleans, Louisiana, U.S.	
42	Draw	23–6–6 (7)	Young Zulu Kid	PTS	10	May 1, 1915	Dauphine Theater, New Orleans, Louisiana, U.S.	
41	Win	23–6–5 (7)	Johnny Solzberg	PTS	8	Mar 1, 1915	Phoenix A.C., Memphis, Tennessee, U.S.	
40	Win	22–6–5 (7)	Marty 'Kid' Taylor	PTS	10	Feb 20, 1915	Dauphine Theater, New Orleans, Louisiana, U.S.	
39	Win	21–6–5 (7)	Johnny Eggers	PTS	10	Jan 12, 1915	Bijou Theater, Atlanta, Georgia, U.S.	
38	Win	20–6–5 (7)	Jimmy Pappas	PTS	10	Dec 17, 1914	Bijou Theater, Atlanta, Georgia, U.S.	
37	Loss	19–6–5 (7)	Frankie Burns	TKO	13 (20)	Nov 15, 1914	McDonoghville Park, New Orleans, Louisiana, U.S.	
36	Win	19–5–5 (7)	Eddie Campi	PTS	20	Sep 13, 1914	McDonoghville Park, New Orleans, Louisiana, U.S.	
35	Loss	18–5–5 (7)	Kid Williams	NWS	10	Jun 30, 1914	Pelican Stadium, New Orleans, Louisiana, U.S.	
34	Win	18–5–5 (6)	Artie Simons	PTS	10	May 11, 1914	Orleans A.C., New Orleans, Louisiana, U.S.	
33	Win	17–5–5 (6)	Nate Jackson	PTS	10	Apr 27, 1914	Orleans A.C., New Orleans, Louisiana, U.S.	
32	Win	16–5–5 (6)	Young Sinnett	PTS	10	Apr 6, 1914	Orleans A.C., New Orleans, Louisiana, U.S.	
31	Win	15–5–5 (6)	Johnny Eggers	NWS	10	Mar 9, 1914	Orleans A.C., New Orleans, Louisiana, U.S.	
30	Win	15–5–5 (5)	Johnny Fisse	NWS	10	Mar 2, 1914	Orleans A.C., New Orleans, Louisiana, U.S.	
29	Win	15–5–5 (4)	Young Allen	KO	10 (10)	Feb 2, 1914	Orleans A.C., New Orleans, Louisiana, U.S.	
28	Draw	14–5–5 (4)	Nate Jackson	PTS	?	Dec 25, 1913	Oklahoma A.C., Oklahoma City, Oklahoma, U.S.	
27	Win	14–5–4 (4)	Austin 'Kid' Greaves	PTS	10	Nov 27, 1913	Pelican Stadium, New Orleans, Louisiana, U.S.	
26	Loss	13–5–4 (4)	Joe Wagner	NWS	10	Nov 3, 1913	Orleans A.C., New Orleans, Louisiana, U.S.	
25	Win	13–5–4 (3)	Nate Jackson	PTS	8	Oct 13, 1913	Phoenix A.C., Memphis, Tennessee, U.S.	
24	Win	12–5–4 (3)	Ruby Hirsch	NWS	10	Oct 7, 1913	Orleans A.C., New Orleans, Louisiana, U.S.	
23	Draw	12–5–4 (2)	Johnny Fisse	PTS	8	Sep 29, 1913	Phoenix A.C., Memphis, Tennessee, U.S.	
22	Win	12–5–3 (2)	Nate Jackson	PTS	8	Sep 15, 1913	Phoenix A.C., Memphis, Tennessee, U.S.	
21	Win	11–5–3 (2)	Eddie Coulon	PTS	8	Sep 1, 1913	Phoenix A.C., Memphis, Tennessee, U.S.	
20	Win	10–5–3 (2)	Jim Walsh	PTS	8	Aug 4, 1913	Phoenix A.C., Memphis, Tennessee, U.S.	
19	Win	9–5–3 (2)	Abe Kabakoff	PTS	8	Jul 21, 1913	Phoenix A.C., Memphis, Tennessee, U.S.	
18	Loss	8–5–3 (2)	Johnny Fisse	PTS	15	Jul 13, 1913	McDonoghville Park, New Orleans, Louisiana, U.S.	
17	Win	8–4–3 (2)	Bobby Dibbons	TKO	7 (10)	Jul 4, 1913	Pelican Stadium, New Orleans, Louisiana, U.S.	
16	Loss	7–4–3 (2)	Johnny Fisse	PTS	10	May 30, 1913	Olympic A.C., New Orleans, Louisiana, U.S.	
15	Win	7–3–3 (2)	Phil Virgets	NWS	10	Apr 26, 1913	Royal A.C., New Orleans, Louisiana, U.S.	
14	Win	7–3–3 (1)	Theo Gormley	PTS	15	Mar 29, 1913	Eunice Club, Lake Charles, Louisiana, U.S.	
13	Win	6–3–3 (1)	Henry Koster	NWS	8	Mar 17, 1913	Orleans A.C., New Orleans, Louisiana, U.S.	
12	Win	6–3–3	Stanley Everett	PTS	10	Mar 8, 1913	Royal A.C., New Orleans, Louisiana, U.S.	
11	Loss	5–3–3	Johnny Fisse	PTS	10	Feb 8, 1913	Royal A.C., New Orleans, Louisiana, U.S.	
10	Draw	5–2–3	Theo Gormley	PTS	15	Jan 20, 1913	Arcade Theatre, Lake Charles, Louisiana, U.S.	
9	Win	5–2–2	Johnny Rosner	PTS	8	Jan 13, 1913	Royal A.C., New Orleans, Louisiana, U.S.	
8	Win	4–2–2	Theo Gormley	PTS	15	Jan 1, 1913	Lake Charles, Louisiana, U.S.	
7	Win	3–2–2	Bill Stevens	PTS	10	Dec 29, 1912	Donaldsonville, Louisiana, U.S.	
6	Win	2–2–2	Buddy Garic	PTS	10	Dec 21, 1912	Houma, Louisiana, U.S.	
5	Loss	1–2–2	Johnny Fisse	PTS	8	Nov 23, 1912	Royal A.C., New Orleans, Louisiana, U.S.	
4	Loss	1–1–2	Johnny Fisse	PTS	8	Nov 18, 1912	Orleans A.C., New Orleans, Louisiana, U.S.	
3	Draw	1–0–2	Eddie Coulon	PTS	6	Oct 21, 1912	Orleans A.C., New Orleans, Louisiana, U.S.	
2	Win	1–0–1	Kid Atkins	TKO	3 (6)	Oct 14, 1912	Orleans A.C., New Orleans, Louisiana, U.S.	
1	Draw	0–0–1	Eddie Coulon	PTS	6	Sep 30, 1912	Orleans A.C., New Orleans, Louisiana, U.S.	

=== Unofficial record ===
145 fights	101 wins	31 losses
By knockout	20	1
By decision	81	29
By disqualification	0	1
Draws	13	

Record with the inclusion of newspaper decisions in the win/loss/draw column.

No.	Result	Record	Opponent	Type	Round	Date	Location	Notes
145	Win	101–31–13	Roy Moore	PTS	10	Apr 24, 1922	Arena, Boston, Massachusetts, U.S.	
144	Win	100–31–13	Babe Asher	TKO	7 (15)	Feb 20, 1922	Tulane Arena, New Orleans, Louisiana, U.S.	
143	Loss	99–31–13	Midget Smith	PTS	15	Dec 22, 1921	Madison Square Garden, Manhattan, New York City, New York, U.S.	
142	Win	99–30–13	Abe Friedman	PTS	10	Dec 13, 1921	Mechanics Building, Boston, Massachusetts, U.S.	
141	Win	98–30–13	Packey O'Gatty	KO	1 (10)	Dec 9, 1921	Clermont Avenue Rink, Brooklyn, New York City, New York, U.S.	
140	Win	97–30–13	Roy Moore	PTS	15	Nov 12, 1921	Clermont Avenue Rink, Brooklyn, New York City, New York, U.S.	
139	Loss	96–30–13	Johnny Buff	PTS	15	Sep 23, 1921	Madison Square Garden, Manhattan, New York City, New York, U.S.	Lost NYSAC and NBA bantamweight titles
138	Win	96–29–13	Charles Ledoux	NWS	10	Sep 5, 1921	Louisiana Auditorium, New Orleans, Louisiana, U.S.	
137	Win	95–29–13	Joe Lynch	PTS	15	Jul 25, 1921	Ebbets Field, Brooklyn, New York City, New York, U.S.	Won NYSAC and NBA bantamweight titles
136	Win	94–29–13	Jim Higgins	KO	11 (20)	Jul 11, 1921	Holland Park Rink, Kensington, London, England, U.K.	
135	Loss	93–29–13	Young Montreal	UD	10	May 27, 1921	Braves Field, Boston, Massachusetts, U.S.	
134	Win	93–28–13	Frankie Daly	PTS	15	Apr 29, 1921	Pilsbury Winter Gardens, New Orleans, Louisiana, U.S.	
133	Loss	92–28–13	Young Montreal	PTS	10	Apr 15, 1921	Arena, Boston, Massachusetts, U.S.	
132	Win	92–27–13	Barney Snyder	TKO	5 (10)	Apr 7, 1921	Service Men's AC, Worcester, Massachusetts, U.S.	
131	Win	91–27–13	Johnny Solzberg	TKO	7 (12)	Apr 4, 1921	Auditorium, Freeport, New York, U.S.	
130	Win	90–27–13	Willie Spencer	TKO	12 (15)	Mar 30, 1921	Pioneer Sporting Club, Manhattan, New York City, New York, U.S.	
129	Win	89–27–13	George Adams	TKO	1 (15)	Mar 24, 1921	Manhattan Casino, Manhattan, New York City, New York, U.S.	
128	Win	88–27–13	Jimmy Wilde	TKO	17 (20)	Jan 13, 1921	Royal Albert Hall, Kensington, London, England, U.K.	
127	Loss	87–27–13	Joe Lynch	UD	15	Dec 22, 1920	Madison Square Garden, Manhattan, New York City, New York, U.S.	Lost NYSAC bantamweight title
126	Win	87–26–13	Jimmy Kelly	NWS	10	Sep 21, 1920	Beardstown, Illinois, U.S.	
125	Loss	86–26–13	Jackie Sharkey	NWS	10	Sep 11, 1920	Oswego Arena, East Chicago, Indiana, U.S.	
124	Loss	86–25–13	Joe Burman	NWS	8	Sep 6, 1920	Coliseum, Saint Louis, Missouri, U.S.	
123	Win	86–24–13	Georgie Lee	NWS	10	Sep 4, 1920	Tulane Arena, New Orleans, Louisiana, U.S.	
122	Win	85–24–13	Roy Moore	NWS	10	Aug 19, 1920	Colorado Springs, Colorado, U.S.	
121	Win	84–24–13	Roy Moore	NWS	8	May 19, 1920	Ice Palace, Philadelphia, Pennsylvania, U.S.	
120	Win	83–24–13	William Henry Vincent	NWS	8	May 10, 1920	Olympia A.C., Philadelphia, Pennsylvania, U.S.	
119	Win	82–24–13	Paul Demers	PTS	10	Apr 19, 1920	Arena A.A., New Bedford, Massachusetts, U.S.	
118	Win	81–24–13	Joe O'Donnell	NWS	8	Mar 31, 1920	Armory, Camden, New Jersey, U.S.	
117	Win	80–24–13	Patsy Johnson	NWS	8	Mar 25, 1920	4th Regiment Armory, Jersey City, New Jersey, U.S.	
116	Win	79–24–13	Lew Angelo	TKO	8 (8)	Mar 19, 1920	Armory, Paterson, New Jersey, U.S.	
115	Draw	78–24–13	Earl Puryear	NWS	8	Mar 1, 1920	Grand Theatre, Trenton A.C., Trenton, New Jersey, U.S.	
114	Win	78–24–12	Johnny Solzberg	NWS	8	Feb 10, 1920	Coliseum, Saint Louis, Missouri, U.S.	
113	Win	77–24–12	Johnny Ritchie	TKO	8 (15)	Jan 7, 1920	Tulane Arena, New Orleans, Louisiana, U.S.	
112	Win	76–24–12	Kid Regan	TKO	3 (8)	Dec 4, 1919	Coliseum, Saint Louis, Missouri, U.S.	Retained world bantamweight title
111	Win	75–24–12	Patsy Johnson	NWS	6	Dec 1, 1919	Olympia A.C., Philadelphia, Pennsylvania, U.S.	
110	Win	74–24–12	Mickey Russell	NWS	8	Nov 27, 1919	Grand View Auditorium, Jersey City, New Jersey, U.S.	
109	Draw	73–24–12	Johnny Buff	NWS	8	Nov 24, 1919	Grand Theatre, Trenton, New Jersey, U.S.	
108	Win	73–24–11	Joe Lynch	NWS	6	Nov 12, 1919	Olympia A.C., Philadelphia, Pennsylvania, U.S.	
107	Win	72–24–11	Harold Farese	NWS	8	Oct 13, 1919	1st Regiment Armory, Newark, New Jersey, U.S.	
106	Loss	71–24–11	Sammy Sandow	NWS	10	Sep 30, 1919	Kentucky National A.C. Tent, Newport, Kentucky, U.S.	
105	Loss	71–23–11	Jackie Sharkey	NWS	10	Sep 15, 1919	Roller Palace Rink, Detroit, Michigan, U.S.	World bantamweight title at stake; (via KO only)
104	Loss	71–22–11	Joe Lynch	NWS	10	Sep 1, 1919	Driveway Park, Waterbury, Connecticut, U.S.	
103	Loss	71–21–11	Jackie Sharkey	NWS	10	Aug 15, 1919	Auditorium, Milwaukee, Wisconsin, U.S.	World bantamweight title at stake; (via KO only)
102	Loss	71–20–11	Bernie Hahn	NWS	10	Aug 6, 1919	Armory Auditorium, Atlanta, Georgia, U.S.	
101	Draw	71–19–11	Dick Griffin	NWS	10	Jul 4, 1919	Fort Worth, Texas, U.S.	
100	Loss	71–19–10	Terry McHugh	NWS	10	Jun 9, 1919	Allentown, Pennsylvania, U.S.	World bantamweight title at stake; (via KO only)
99	Win	71–18–10	Kid Regan	NWS	8	May 29, 1919	Coliseum, Saint Louis, Missouri, U.S.	
98	Win	70–18–10	Johnny Ertle	TKO	5 (10)	May 23, 1919	Kenwood Armory, Minneapolis, Minnesota, U.S.	Retained world bantamweight title
97	Win	69–18–10	Johnny Solzberg	NWS	10	May 12, 1919	Arena, Syracuse, New York, U.S.	World bantamweight title at stake; (via KO only)
96	Win	68–18–10	Patsy Wallace	NWS	6	May 3, 1919	National A.C., Philadelphia, Pennsylvania, U.S.	World bantamweight title at stake; (via KO only)
95	Loss	67–18–10	Kid Regan	NWS	8	Apr 25, 1919	Coliseum, Saint Louis, Missouri, U.S.	
94	Win	67–17–10	Patsy Johnson	NWS	8	Apr 21, 1919	Grand Theater, Trenton, New Jersey, U.S.	
93	Loss	66–17–10	Al Shubert	NWS	10	Apr 8, 1919	Lyric Theater, Baltimore, Maryland, U.S.	
92	Loss	66–16–10	Memphis Pal Moore	NWS	8	Mar 24, 1919	New Lyric Theater, Memphis, Tennessee, U.S.	
91	Draw	66–15–10	Johnny Rosner	PTS	10	Mar 14, 1919	Long Island, New York, U.S.	
90	Loss	66–15–9	Al Shubert	NWS	10	Mar 10, 1919	New Bedford, Massachusetts, U.S.	
89	Loss	66–14–9	Jack "Kid" Wolfe	NWS	10	Mar 4, 1919	Gray's Armory, Cleveland, Ohio, U.S.	
88	Win	66–13–9	Patsy Scanlon	NWS	10	Feb 10, 1919	Duquesne Garden, Pittsburgh, Pennsylvania, U.S.	
87	Win	65–13–9	Young Zulu Kid	NWS	8	Sep 6, 1918	International League Ballpark, Jersey City, New Jersey, U.S.	
86	Win	64–13–9	Jackie Sharkey	NWS	6	Sep 2, 1918	Olympia A.C., Philadelphia, Pennsylvania, U.S.	
85	Loss	63–13–9	Frankie Burns	NWS	8	Jul 4, 1918	International League Ballpark, Jersey City, New Jersey, U.S.	
84	Win	63–12–9	Nate Jackson	PTS	10	Jun 22, 1918	Louisiana Auditorium, New Orleans, Louisiana, U.S.	
83	Loss	62–12–9	Andy Chaney	NWS	10	May 8, 1918	Lyric Theater, Baltimore, Maryland, U.S.	
82	Win	62–11–9	Jackie Sharkey	NWS	6	May 4, 1918	National A.C., Philadelphia, Pennsylvania, U.S.	
81	Draw	61–11–9	Gussie Lewis	NWS	6	Dec 19, 1917	National A.C., Philadelphia, Pennsylvania, U.S.	
80	Win	61–11–8	Frankie Mason	TKO	3 (10)	Dec 14, 1917	Majestic Theatre, Fort Wayne, Indiana, U.S.	
79	Win	60–11–8	Joe Tuber	NWS	6	Dec 10, 1917	Olympia A.C., Philadelphia, Pennsylvania, U.S.	
78	Win	59–11–8	Frankie Burns	PTS	20	Nov 5, 1917	Louisiana Auditorium, New Orleans, Louisiana, U.S.	Retained NYSAC bantamweight title
77	Win	58–11–8	Johnny Eggers	NWS	6	Sep 17, 1917	Olympia A.C., Philadelphia, Pennsylvania, U.S.	
76	Win	57–11–8	Earl Puryear	NWS	10	Sep 10, 1917	Baseball Park, Tulsa, Oklahoma, U.S.	
75	Win	56–11–8	Nate Jackson	NWS	10	Sep 3, 1917	Baseball Park, Tulsa, Oklahoma, U.S.	
74	Win	55–11–8	Jack Douglas	PTS	10	Aug 21, 1917	Tulane Arena, New Orleans, Louisiana, U.S.	
73	Win	54–11–8	Kid Williams	NWS	6	Jun 13, 1917	Olympia A.C., Philadelphia, Pennsylvania, U.S.	
72	Win	53–11–8	Joe Lynch	NWS	10	Jun 1, 1917	Pioneer Sporting Club, Manhattan, New York City, New York, U.S.	
71	Win	52–11–8	Gussie Lewis	NWS	6	May 21, 1917	Olympia A.C., Philadelphia, Pennsylvania, U.S.	
70	Win	51–11–8	Johnny Coulon	TKO	3 (10)	May 14, 1917	Lakeside Auditorium, Racine, Wisconsin, U.S.	
69	Win	50–11–8	Harry Coulin	NWS	10	May 3, 1917	Broadway Auditorium, Buffalo, New York, U.S.	
68	Win	49–11–8	Pekin Kid Herman	NWS	10	Apr 27, 1917	Peoria, Illinois, U.S.	
67	Win	48–11–8	Dutch Brandt	NWS	10	Mar 13, 1917	Broadway S.C., Brooklyn, New York City, New York, U.S.	
66	Win	47–11–8	William Henry Vincent	NWS	10	Mar 6, 1917	German Hall, Albany, New York, U.S.	
65	Win	46–11–8	Harry Kabakoff	NWS	10	Feb 20, 1917	Coliseum, Saint Louis, Missouri, U.S.	
64	Win	45–11–8	Sammy Sandow	NWS	10	Feb 12, 1917	Heuck's Opera House, Cincinnati, Ohio, U.S.	
63	Win	44–11–8	Kid Williams	PTS	20	Jan 9, 1917	Louisiana Auditorium, New Orleans, Louisiana, U.S.	Won NYSAC bantamweight title
62	Win	43–11–8	Leo Schneider	PTS	8	Dec 11, 1916	Phoenix A.C., Memphis, Tennessee, U.S.	
61	Win	42–11–8	Johnny Eggers	PTS	20	Nov 6, 1916	Louisiana Auditorium, New Orleans, Louisiana, U.S.	
60	Win	41–11–8	Bernie Hahn	NWS	6	Sep 30, 1916	National A.C., Philadelphia, Pennsylvania, U.S.	
59	Win	40–11–8	Jimmy Pappas	PTS	10	Sep 4, 1916	Armory Auditorium, Atlanta, Georgia, U.S.	
58	Win	39–11–8	Roy Moore	PTS	15	Jul 31, 1916	Orleans A.C., New Orleans, Louisiana, U.S.	
57	Win	38–11–8	George Brown	KO	5 (8)	Jul 10, 1916	Phoenix A.C., Memphis, Tennessee, U.S.	
56	Win	37–11–8	Frankie Brown	PTS	15	Jun 12, 1916	Orleans A.C., New Orleans, Louisiana, U.S.	
55	Draw	36–11–8	Frankie Brown	PTS	15	Mar 24, 1916	Albaugh's Theater, Baltimore, Maryland, U.S.	
54	Loss	36–11–7	Lew Tendler	NWS	6	Feb 28, 1916	Olympia A.C., Philadelphia, Pennsylvania, U.S.	
53	Draw	36–10–7	Kid Williams	PTS	20	Feb 7, 1916	Louisiana Auditorium, New Orleans, Louisiana, U.S.	For NYSAC bantamweight title
52	Win	36–10–6	Eddie Coulon	KO	4 (15)	Dec 13, 1915	Orleans A.C., New Orleans, Louisiana, U.S.	
51	Win	35–10–6	Young Zulu Kid	PTS	15	Nov 29, 1915	Orleans A.C., New Orleans, Louisiana, U.S.	
50	Loss	34–10–6	Memphis Pal Moore	PTS	8	Nov 15, 1915	Phoenix A.C., Memphis, Tennessee, U.S.	
49	Win	34–9–6	Sammy Sandow	PTS	15	Oct 6, 1915	Tommy Burns Arena, New Orleans, Louisiana, U.S.	
48	Win	33–9–6	Nate Jackson	PTS	15	Sep 13, 1915	Denver, Colorado, U.S.	
47	Loss	32–9–6	Nate Jackson	DQ	3 (15)	Sep 6, 1915	National A.C., Denver, Colorado, U.S.	
46	Win	32–8–6	Jack Doyle	PTS	15	Jul 21, 1915	Tulane Arena, New Orleans, Louisiana, U.S.	
45	Win	31–8–6	Louisiana	PTS	20	Jul 2, 1915	Tulane Arena, New Orleans, Louisiana, U.S.	
44	Win	30–8–6	Harry Bramer	KO	4 (15)	Jun 18, 1915	Denver, Colorado, U.S.	
43	Win	29–8–6	Al Shubert	PTS	15	May 18, 1915	Tommy Burns Arena, New Orleans, Louisiana, U.S.	
42	Draw	28–8–6	Young Zulu Kid	PTS	10	May 1, 1915	Dauphine Theater, New Orleans, Louisiana, U.S.	
41	Win	28–8–5	Johnny Solzberg	PTS	8	Mar 1, 1915	Phoenix A.C., Memphis, Tennessee, U.S.	
40	Win	27–8–5	Marty 'Kid' Taylor	PTS	10	Feb 20, 1915	Dauphine Theater, New Orleans, Louisiana, U.S.	
39	Win	26–8–5	Johnny Eggers	PTS	10	Jan 12, 1915	Bijou Theater, Atlanta, Georgia, U.S.	
38	Win	25–8–5	Jimmy Pappas	PTS	10	Dec 17, 1914	Bijou Theater, Atlanta, Georgia, U.S.	
37	Loss	24–8–5	Frankie Burns	TKO	13 (20)	Nov 15, 1914	McDonoghville Park, New Orleans, Louisiana, U.S.	
36	Win	24–7–5	Eddie Campi	PTS	20	Sep 13, 1914	McDonoghville Park, New Orleans, Louisiana, U.S.	
35	Loss	23–7–5	Kid Williams	NWS	10	Jun 30, 1914	Pelican Stadium, New Orleans, Louisiana, U.S.	
34	Win	23–6–5	Artie Simons	PTS	10	May 11, 1914	Orleans A.C., New Orleans, Louisiana, U.S.	
33	Win	22–6–5	Nate Jackson	PTS	10	Apr 27, 1914	Orleans A.C., New Orleans, Louisiana, U.S.	
32	Win	21–6–5	Young Sinnett	PTS	10	Apr 6, 1914	Orleans A.C., New Orleans, Louisiana, U.S.	
31	Win	20–6–5	Johnny Eggers	NWS	10	Mar 9, 1914	Orleans A.C., New Orleans, Louisiana, U.S.	
30	Win	19–6–5	Johnny Fisse	NWS	10	Mar 2, 1914	Orleans A.C., New Orleans, Louisiana, U.S.	
29	Win	18–6–5	Young Allen	KO	10 (10)	Feb 2, 1914	Orleans A.C., New Orleans, Louisiana, U.S.	
28	Draw	17–6–5	Nate Jackson	PTS	?	Dec 25, 1913	Oklahoma A.C., Oklahoma City, Oklahoma, U.S.	
27	Win	17–6–4	Austin 'Kid' Greaves	PTS	10	Nov 27, 1913	Pelican Stadium, New Orleans, Louisiana, U.S.	
26	Loss	16–6–4	Joe Wagner	NWS	10	Nov 3, 1913	Orleans A.C., New Orleans, Louisiana, U.S.	
25	Win	16–5–4	Nate Jackson	PTS	8	Oct 13, 1913	Phoenix A.C., Memphis, Tennessee, U.S.	
24	Win	15–5–4	Ruby Hirsch	NWS	10	Oct 7, 1913	Orleans A.C., New Orleans, Louisiana, U.S.	
23	Draw	14–5–4	Johnny Fisse	PTS	8	Sep 29, 1913	Phoenix A.C., Memphis, Tennessee, U.S.	
22	Win	14–5–3	Nate Jackson	PTS	8	Sep 15, 1913	Phoenix A.C., Memphis, Tennessee, U.S.	
21	Win	13–5–3	Eddie Coulon	PTS	8	Sep 1, 1913	Phoenix A.C., Memphis, Tennessee, U.S.	
20	Win	12–5–3	Jim Walsh	PTS	8	Aug 4, 1913	Phoenix A.C., Memphis, Tennessee, U.S.	
19	Win	11–5–3	Abe Kabakoff	PTS	8	Jul 21, 1913	Phoenix A.C., Memphis, Tennessee, U.S.	
18	Loss	10–5–3	Johnny Fisse	PTS	15	Jul 13, 1913	McDonoghville Park, New Orleans, Louisiana, U.S.	
17	Win	10–4–3	Bobby Dibbons	TKO	7 (10)	Jul 4, 1913	Pelican Stadium, New Orleans, Louisiana, U.S.	
16	Loss	9–4–3	Johnny Fisse	PTS	10	May 30, 1913	Olympic A.C., New Orleans, Louisiana, U.S.	
15	Win	9–3–3	Phil Virgets	NWS	10	Apr 26, 1913	Royal A.C., New Orleans, Louisiana, U.S.	
14	Win	8–3–3	Theo Gormley	PTS	15	Mar 29, 1913	Eunice Club, Lake Charles, Louisiana, U.S.	
13	Win	7–3–3	Henry Koster	NWS	8	Mar 17, 1913	Orleans A.C., New Orleans, Louisiana, U.S.	
12	Win	6–3–3	Stanley Everett	PTS	10	Mar 8, 1913	Royal A.C., New Orleans, Louisiana, U.S.	
11	Loss	5–3–3	Johnny Fisse	PTS	10	Feb 8, 1913	Royal A.C., New Orleans, Louisiana, U.S.	
10	Draw	5–2–3	Theo Gormley	PTS	15	Jan 20, 1913	Arcade Theatre, Lake Charles, Louisiana, U.S.	
9	Win	5–2–2	Johnny Rosner	PTS	8	Jan 13, 1913	Royal A.C., New Orleans, Louisiana, U.S.	
8	Win	4–2–2	Theo Gormley	PTS	15	Jan 1, 1913	Lake Charles, Louisiana, U.S.	
7	Win	3–2–2	Bill Stevens	PTS	10	Dec 29, 1912	Donaldsonville, Louisiana, U.S.	
6	Win	2–2–2	Buddy Garic	PTS	10	Dec 21, 1912	Houma, Louisiana, U.S.	
5	Loss	1–2–2	Johnny Fisse	PTS	8	Nov 23, 1912	Royal A.C., New Orleans, Louisiana, U.S.	
4	Loss	1–1–2	Johnny Fisse	PTS	8	Nov 18, 1912	Orleans A.C., New Orleans, Louisiana, U.S.	
3	Draw	1–0–2	Eddie Coulon	PTS	6	Oct 21, 1912	Orleans A.C., New Orleans, Louisiana, U.S.	
2	Win	1–0–1	Kid Atkins	TKO	3 (6)	Oct 14, 1912	Orleans A.C., New Orleans, Louisiana, U.S.	
1	Draw	0–0–1	Eddie Coulon	PTS	6	Sep 30, 1912	Orleans A.C., New Orleans, Louisiana, U.S.	

== Titles in boxing ==
=== Major world titles ===
- World bantamweight champion (Note: Was considered "World" champion when boxing became illegal in New York State in 1917.) (118 lbs)
- NYSAC bantamweight champion (118 lbs) (2×) (Note: NYSAC is disbanded after boxing becomes illegal in New York State on November 15, 1917; NYSAC is reestablished on March 25, 1920 when the Walker law is passed making boxing legal again.)
- NBA (WBA) bantamweight champion (118 lbs)

=== Undisputed titles ===
- Undisputed bantamweight champion

== See also ==
- List of bantamweight boxing champions

== Notes and references ==
=== References ===
Achievements
Preceded by Kid Williams	World Bantamweight Boxing Champion; January 9, 1917 – December 26, 1920	Succeeded by Joe Lynch
Preceded by Joe Lynch	World Bantamweight Boxing Champion; July 25, 1921 – September 23, 1921	Succeeded by Johnny Buff
