= Johnny Buff =

American boxer (1889–1955)

Personal information
- Nicknames: John Lesky; Johnny Buff
- Born: John Lisky; June 12, 1888 Perth Amboy, New Jersey, U.S.
- Died: January 14, 1955 (aged 66) East Orange, New Jersey, U.S.
- Height: 5 ft 3 in (1.60 m)
- Weight: Bantamweight

Boxing career
- Stance: Orthodox

Boxing record
- Total fights: 100 (With the inclusion of newspaper decisions)
- Wins: 67
- Win by KO: 14
- Losses: 20
- Draws: 9
- No contests: 4

John Lisky (June 12, 1889 – January 14, 1955), better known as Johnny Buff, was an American boxer. He was the Undisputed World Bantamweight Champion from 1921 to 1922.

== Early life ==
Buff was born to a family of Polish heritage on June 12, 1888, in Perth Amboy, New Jersey. He was christened John Lisky. He later took the ring name "Buff" as his friends where he grew up often called him "Buffalo". He enlisted in the Navy in 1911, at the age of 23, but did not become seriously involved in boxing until 1915, when he boxed for the Navy aboard the USS Rhode Island. He served in the Navy until roughly 1919 at the end of World War I, though he would later re-enlist.

== Early career ==
=== Win over Johnny Rossner ===
Turning pro upon his release from the Navy around 1919, he came under the tutelage of Lew Diamond.

The most important boxing victory in his early career may have been an upset win over Johnny Rossner at the Armory in Jersey City, New Jersey, in a fairly convincing eight round newspaper win on June 23, 1919. On November 24, 1919, he first met future champion Pete Herman, fighting him to an eight-round newspaper decision at the Grand Theater in Trenton, New Jersey. He defeated Tommy Gorman at the Armory in Reading, Pennsylvania, in a second-round knockout on December 16, 1919. Gorman went down for the count after thirty seconds of fighting in the second round. Buff led noticeably in the first round landing a flurry of blows against which Buff could not defend. The final blows ending the fight came with Gorman against the ropes.

On May 31, 1920, he knocked out Willie LaMorte in the sixth of eight rounds at the Outdoor Arena in Jersey City, New Jersey. LaMorte would later contend for the NYSAC World Flyweight Title. He first fought future champion Abe Goldstein on July 6, 1920, in New Jersey in a twelve-round, no-decision bout, where several newspapers gave him a decided edge.

=== Bouts with Frankie Mason ===
On September 27, 1920, he defeated Frankie Mason at the Olympia Athletic Club in Philadelphia in an eight-round newspaper decision. Buff took the bout with a considerable points advantage. On February 11, 1921, he defeated Mason at the Tulane Auditorium in New Orleans, Louisiana, in a fifteen-round points decision. Mason may have taken as few as two rounds in the fifteen. In the fifth round, a bad cut was opened over Mason's left eye. In their February fight, Mason was competing in the semi-final bout of the Flyweight Champion of America

== American Fly and World Bantam Titles ==
In 1921, Buff won both the World Bantamweight Championship and the American Flyweight Championship. He became the flyweight champion by defeating Abe Goldstein in New York City on March 31, 1921. Goldstein would hold the World Bantamweight Championship three years later. In the second round, Buff shot a hard right that landed solidly on Goldstein's chin causing the knockout. Goldstein tried to rise at the count of ten but had such difficulty in several attempts that the referee called the fight. Goldstein having to drop five to seven pounds to make the weight of 110 may have contributed to a lack of readiness for the bout.

=== Defenses of American Fly Title ===
On April 16, 1921, he defeated Young Zulu Kid, in an American Flyweight Championship bout in a fifteen-round points decision at the Broadway Arena in Brooklyn. Buff floored the Kid for a count of nine in the first round, and battered him around the ring consistently in the fourteenth.

On May 2, 1921, Buff defended his American Flyweight Championship against Eddie O'Dowd at Madison Square Garden in a twelve-round unanimous decision. In the second round, fighting with both hands and greater speed, Buff put O'Dowd on the mat for the first time. In the last six rounds, O'Dowd took considerable punishment, and appeared to have received a broken nose in the eighth, which greatly affected his chances. O'Dowd fought the last four rounds gamely never giving up the bout, but losing on points. Somehow in the eleventh round, O'Dowd landed three solid right hooks to Buff's jaw, but was unable to bring him to the mat. Buff won handily on points.

He defeated Charles Ledoux on August 10, 1921, in a non-title fight in the Bronx in a ten-round points decision. The crowd did not entirely approve of the decision. Ledoux would hold the French and European EBU Featherweight Championship in 1924, and the French and European EBU Bantamweight Championship in 1922–1923, having taken both titles earlier in his career.

=== World Bantam Champion, Sep 1921 ===
Pete Herman

Six months after taking the American Flyweight Championship, on September 23, 1921, Buff won the World Bantamweight Championship by defeating Pete Herman in Madison Square Garden in a fifteen-round points decision. Buff took ten of the fifteen rounds, with only four given to Herman and one even. By the fifteenth round, Herman was exhausted and Buff reigned blows on him without Herman putting up an effective defense. Buff was remarkable for taking a world title at the advanced age for a boxer of 32.

==== World Bantam Title defenses ====
Buff had a noteworthy defense of the World Bantamweight Title at Madison Square Garden against Jackie Sharkey on November 10, 1921, in a fifteen-round points decision.

==== Loss of World Bantam Title, 1922 ====
On July 10, 1922, Buff lost the World Bantamweight Championship to Joe Lynch at the Velodrome in New York in a fourteenth-round TKO. After six seconds of fighting in the fourteenth, Lynch having taken three strides toward Buff at the sound of the bell, delivered a left hook to the jaw that ended the fight. One source gave Lynch fourteen of the fifteen rounds, in a victory he could have easily won on points, gaining a considerable advantage by the late rounds. Buff was unable to get past the defenses of Lynch and landed comparatively fewer blows. Lynch's three inch advantage in height and reach may have been a factor in his victory. A few ringside felt that facing Lynch so soon after taking the bantamweight championship was poor matchmaking on the part of Buff's handlers. In an advantageous pre-fight negotiation, Buff made $30,000 on the results of the fight, while Lynch technically made nothing due to the house receipts given to Lynch amounting to only around $20,000.

=== Loss of American Fly Title, Sep 1922 ===
Buff officially lost the American Flyweight Championship on September 14, 1922, in an eleventh-round technical knockout against the great Filipino boxer Pancho Villa at Ebbets Field in New York City. Buff was down twice in the tenth and once in the eleventh. From the fourth through the sixth, Villa showed a clear advantage and delivered considerably more blows. By the ninth, Buff was becoming groggy from the blows of his opponent. In the tenth Villa scored two knockdowns. In the eleventh, under a vicious attack, Buff slipped to the floor while up against the ropes and receiving a series of uppercuts.

At 115 pounds, on March 17, 1924, he defeated Benny Schwartz at the Armory in Baltimore in a twelve-round points decision. A prolific Jewish Baltimore-based boxer, by 1928 Schwartz would be rated in the top ten of bantamweights in the world.

== Personal life ==
Lisky joined the United States Navy prior to World War I. When the war arrived, he waived the family exemption, and joined the Navy for a second time. After his professional boxing career, he enlisted for a third time in the Navy, becoming a gunner's mate on the USS Wyoming (BB-32) by 1928. In 1928, he was known as "Gunner's Mate Spike Lisky", serving aboard the USS California (BB-44).

He married Elizabeth Kolar, with whom he had three children, Jimmy, Johnny, and Theresa. His grandchildren Michael Buffer and Bruce Buffer are famous sports announcers.

== Death ==
Lisky died after a long illness on January 14, 1955, at the Veterans Administration Hospital in East Orange, New Jersey. He was 66 years old and had been a resident of Jersey City most of his life.

== Selected fights ==
12 Wins, 2 Losses, 1 Draw
| Result | Opponent(s) | Date | Location | Duration | Notes |
| Win | John Rossner | Jun 23, 1919 | Jersey City | 8 Rounds | Newspaper Decision |
| Draw | Pete Herman | Nov 24, 1919 | Trenton, N. J. | 8 Rounds | Newspaper Decision |
| Win | Abe Goldstein | July 6, 1920 | Jersey City | 12 Rounds | Newspaper Decision |
| Win | Frankie Mason | Sep 27, 1920 | Philadelphia | 8 Rounds | Newspaper Decision |
| Win | Frankie Mason | Feb 11, 1921 | New Orleans | 15 Rounds | Semi-Final Amer. Fly. Title |
| Win | Abe Goldstein | Mar 31, 1921 | New York City | 2 Rounds, TKO | Won American Flyweight Title |
| Win | Charles LeDoux | Aug 10, 1921 | Bronx, NY | 10 Rounds | LeDoux was European champ |
| Win | Young Zulu Kid | Aug 16, 1921 | Brooklyn | 20 Rounds | Kept American Flyweight Title |
| Win | Eddie O'Dowd | May 2, 1921 | New York City | 12 Rounds | Kept American Flyweight Title |
| Win | Pete Herman | Sept 23, 1921 | New York | 15 Rounds | Won World Bantamweight Title |
| Win | Jackie Sharkey | Nov 10, 1921 | New York | 15 Rounds | Kept World Bantamweight Title |
| Loss | Joe Lynch | July 10, 1922 | New York | 14 Rounds, TKO | Lost World Bantamweight Title |
| Loss | Pancho Villa | Sep 14, 1922 | Brooklyn | 11 Rounds, TKO | Lost American Flyweight Title |
| Win | Harry Forbes | Jan 27, 1924 | Columbus, Ohio | 10 Rounds | |
| Win | Benny Schwartz | Mar 17, 1924 | Baltimore | 12 Rounds | |

== Titles in boxing ==
=== Major world titles ===
- NYSAC bantamweight champion (118 lbs)
- NBA (WBA) bantamweight champion (118 lbs)

=== Regional/International titles ===
- American flyweight champion (112 lbs)

=== Undisputed titles ===
- Undisputed bantamweight champion

== See also ==
- List of bantamweight boxing champions

Achievements
| Vacant Title last held by Frankie Mason | American Flyweight Champion; March 31, 1921 – September 14, 1922 | Succeeded by Pancho Villa |
| Preceded by Pete Herman | World Bantamweight Champion; September 23, 1921 – July 10, 1922 | Succeeded by Joe Lynch |
