= Joseph Lynch (cricketer) =

Irish cricketer

Personal information
- Full name: Joseph Edward Lynch
- Born: 26 April 1880; Monkstown, Dublin, Ireland
- Died: 25 September 1915 (aged 35); Loos-en-Gohelle, Pas-de-Calais, France
- Batting: Right-handed
- Bowling: Right-arm medium-fast

Career statistics
Competition	First-class
Matches	1
Runs scored	12
Batting average	6.00
100s/50s	–/–
Top score	11
Balls bowled	36
Wickets	0
Bowling average	–
5 wickets in innings	–
10 wickets in match	–
Best bowling	–
Catches/stumpings	–/–
- Source: Cricinfo, 2 January 2022

Captain Joseph Edward Lynch (born 26 April 1880 in Monkstown, Dublin, Ireland; died 25 September 1915 in Loos, France) was an Irish cricketer. A right-handed batsman and right-arm medium-fast bowler, he played twice for the Ireland cricket team in September 1909.

His first match for Ireland was against "All New York" on Staten Island. He did not score a run in the match as Ireland won by an innings. In his second match, also his only first-class match, he played against Philadelphia, and was the tenth victim of Bart King in the Irish first innings. He did not play for Ireland again.

Lynch was a British Army officer who first commissioned into the Royal Irish Fusiliers, and during World War I rose to be a captain in the 10th West Yorkshire Regiment. He was killed during the Battle of Loos on 25 September 1915.
