= Joe Lynch (boxer) =

American boxer (1898–1965)

Personal information
- Nationality: American
- Born: Joseph Aloysius Lynch; November 30, 1898 New York, New York
- Died: September 1, 1965 (aged 66) Brooklyn, New York
- Height: 5 ft 6 in (1.68 m)
- Weight: Bantamweight

Boxing career
- Reach: 66 in (168 cm)
- Stance: Orthodox

Boxing record
- Total fights: 158
- Wins: 99
- Win by KO: 37
- Losses: 36
- Draws: 21
- No contests: 2

Joseph "Joe" Aloysius Lynch (November 30, 1898 – August 1, 1965) was an American boxer who was the first Undisputed Bantamweight Champion. An extremely durable fighter, Lynch was never knocked out in nearly 160 bouts despite an aggressive fighting style. Statistical boxing website BoxRec lists Lynch as the #11 ranked bantamweight of all time, while The Ring Magazine founder Nat Fleischer placed him at #4. The International Boxing Research Organization rates Lynch as the 11th best bantamweight ever. He was inducted into the International Boxing Hall of Fame in 2005 within the "Old-Timer" category.

== Pro career ==
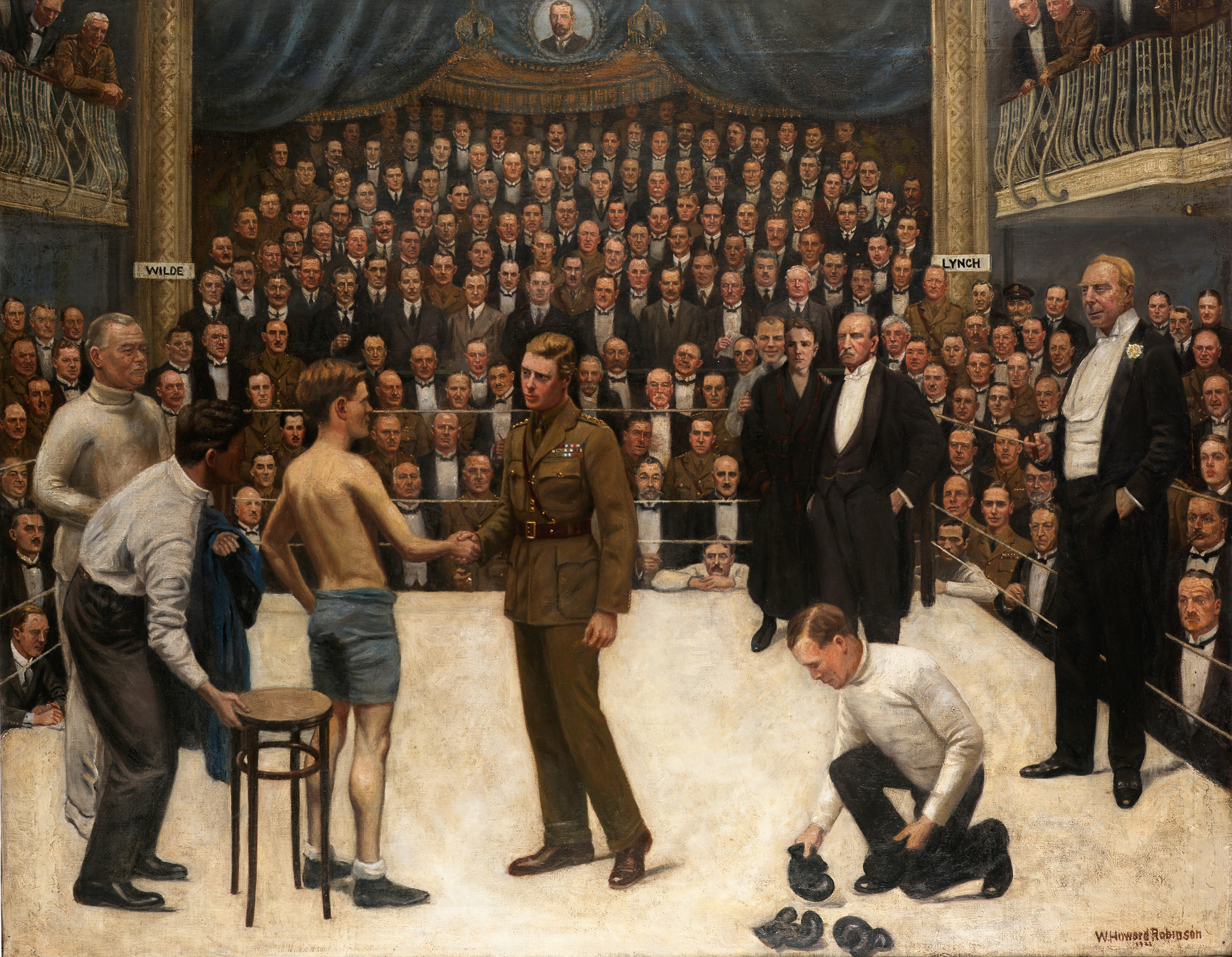
The Prince of Wales, later King Edward VIII, congratulates Jimmy Wilde after his victory over Joe Lynch.

Lynch was born in New York City. He won the world bantamweight title in 1920, defeating Pete Herman. Herman defeated him to regain the title the following year. Lynch regained the title from Johnny Buff after Buff defeated Herman, defended it successfully against Midget Smith, but lost in 15 rounds to Abe Goldstein in 1924.

== Death ==
He retired in 1926 and went to live in New City, NY. After retiring from boxing, Lynch bought a farm and a gymnasium with his earnings from the ring. He later served as postmaster for New City.

In 1965 he drowned in an accident in Sheepshead Bay, Brooklyn. He was found floating in a New York City bay and died en route to the hospital. Foul play was suspected.

== Professional boxing record ==
All information in this section is derived from BoxRec, unless otherwise stated.

=== Official record ===
158 fights	53 wins	12 losses
By knockout	39	0
By decision	14	12
Draws	8	
No contests	2	
Newspaper decisions/draws	83	

All newspaper decisions are officially regarded as “no decision” bouts and are not counted as a win, loss or draw.

No.	Result	Record	Opponent	Type	Round	Date	Location	Notes
158	Win	53–12–8 (85)	Eddie Siegel	TKO	3 (8)	Dec 17, 1926	Moose Hall, Grantwood, New Jersey, U.S.	
157	Win	52–12–8 (85)	Willie Spencer	TKO	5 (10)	Oct 11, 1926	Armory, Hackensack, New Jersey, U.S.	
156	Win	51–12–8 (85)	Frankie Murray	KO	3 (10)	Sep 22, 1926	Mitchel Field Arena, Mineola, New York, U.S.	
155	Loss	50–12–8 (85)	Memphis Pal Moore	NWS	10	Mar 4, 1926	Miami Field, Miami, Florida, U.S.	
154	Draw	50–12–8 (84)	Memphis Pal Moore	PTS	10	Feb 24, 1926	Municipal Ball Park, Fort Lauderdale, Florida, U.S.	
153	Draw	50–12–7 (84)	Jackie Sharkey	PTS	4	Jul 2, 1925	Polo Grounds, New York City, New York, U.S.	
152	Loss	50–12–6 (84)	Willie Cunningham	PTS	6	May 18, 1925	Broadway Auditorium, Buffalo, New York, U.S.	
151	Draw	50–11–6 (84)	Larry Goldberg	PTS	12	May 5, 1925	Albany, New York, U.S.	
150	Loss	50–11–5 (84)	Len Brenner	UD	8	Apr 6, 1925	Fulton Opera House, Lancaster, Pennsylvania, U.S.	
149	Loss	50–10–5 (84)	Pete Sarmiento	UD	10	Sep 8, 1924	Shibe Park, Philadelphia, Pennsylvania, U.S.	
148	Loss	50–9–5 (84)	Johnny Sheppard	PTS	10	Jul 11, 1924	Arena, Boston, Massachusetts, U.S.	
147	Loss	50–8–5 (84)	Abe Goldstein	PTS	15	Mar 21, 1924	Madison Square Garden, New York City, New York, U.S.	Lost NBA bantamweight title; For NYSAC bantamweight title
146	Win	50–7–5 (84)	Eddie Gorman	KO	3 (10)	Feb 4, 1924	Shreveport AC, Shreveport, Louisiana, U.S.	
145	Win	49–7–5 (84)	Paddy Owens	KO	2 (10)	Jan 23, 1924	El Dorado, Arkansas, U.S.	
144	Loss	48–7–5 (84)	Eddie McKenna	PTS	10	Jan 18, 1924	Coliseum Arena, New Orleans, Louisiana, U.S.	
143	Win	48–6–5 (84)	Earl McArthur	PTS	10	Jan 4, 1924	Auditorium, Omaha, Nebraska, U.S.	
142	Win	47–6–5 (84)	Jimmy Murphy	KO	3 (10)	Jan 1, 1924	Armory, Akron, Ohio, U.S.	
141	Win	46–6–5 (84)	Eddie Coulon	KO	3 (?)	Dec 3, 1923	1st Regiment Armory, Newark, New Jersey, U.S.	
140	Loss	45–6–5 (84)	Memphis Pal Moore	NWS	10	Nov 27, 1923	Coliseum, Saint Louis, Missouri, U.S.	
139	Win	45–6–5 (83)	Frankie Murray	TKO	5 (10)	Nov 23, 1923	Peoria, Illinois, U.S.	
138	Win	44–6–5 (83)	Eddie Siegel	KO	3 (8)	Sep 7, 1923	Shibe Park, Philadelphia, Pennsylvania, U.S.	
137	Loss	43–6–5 (83)	Harold Smith	NWS	10	Aug 31, 1923	Mullen-Sager Arena, Aurora, Illinois, U.S.	
136	Win	43–6–5 (82)	Battling Reddy	NWS	12	Aug 2, 1923	Playgrounds Stadium, West New York, New Jersey, U.S.	
135	Win	43–6–5 (81)	Patsy Johnson	KO	6 (10)	Jul 13, 1923	Erie, Pennsylvania, U.S.	
134	Draw	42–6–5 (81)	Bobby Wolgast	NWS	8	Jul 9, 1923	Shibe Park, Philadelphia, Pennsylvania, U.S.	
133	Loss	42–6–5 (80)	Young Montreal	NWS	10	May 29, 1923	Providence, Rhode Island, U.S.	
132	Win	42–6–5 (79)	Joe O'Donnell	NWS	12	Apr 10, 1923	Exposition Building, Portland, Oregon, U.S.	NYSAC and NBA bantamweight titles at stake; (via KO only)
131	Win	42–6–5 (78)	Midget Smith	NWS	10	Apr 4, 1923	Coliseum, Chicago, Illinois, U.S.	
130	Loss	42–6–5 (77)	Joe Burman	NWS	10	Mar 19, 1923	Dexter Park Pavilion, Chicago, Illinois, U.S.	
129	Loss	42–6–5 (76)	Jimmy Mendo	NWS	8	Mar 5, 1923	Arena, Philadelphia, Pennsylvania, U.S.	
128	Win	42–6–5 (75)	Pete Husic	NWS	8	Feb 27, 1923	Chestnut Street Auditorium, Harrisburg, Pennsylvania, U.S.	
127	Win	42–6–5 (74)	Midget Smith	UD	15	Dec 22, 1922	Madison Square Garden, New York City, New York, U.S.	Retained NYSAC and NBA bantamweight titles
126	Win	41–6–5 (74)	Joey Sangor	NWS	10	Dec 7, 1922	Auditorium, Milwaukee, Wisconsin, U.S.	
125	Win	41–6–5 (73)	Frankie Daly	NWS	10	Nov 30, 1922	Tomlinson Hall, Indianapolis, Indiana, U.S.	
124	Win	41–6–5 (72)	Benny Schwartz	KO	5 (12)	Nov 24, 1922	Memorial Hall, Springfield, Ohio, U.S.	Retained NYSAC and NBA bantamweight titles
123	Loss	40–6–5 (72)	Jack "Kid" Wolfe	UD	15	Sep 21, 1922	Madison Square Garden, New York City, New York, U.S.	For inaugural world junior-featherweight title
122	Win	40–5–5 (72)	Memphis Pal Moore	NWS	12	Sep 4, 1922	Floyd Fitzsimmons' Arena, Michigan City, Indiana, U.S.	
121	Win	40–5–5 (71)	Ben Levy	KO	4 (12)	Aug 24, 1922	Stockyards Arena, Fort Worth, Texas, U.S.	
120	Win	39–5–5 (71)	Frankie Murray	KO	6 (15)	Aug 21, 1922	Pierre Avenue Arena, Shreveport, Louisiana, U.S.	Retained NYSAC, NBA, and USA Louisiana State bantamweight titles
119	Win	38–5–5 (71)	Johnny Buff	TKO	14 (15)	Jul 10, 1922	Velodrome, New York City, New York, U.S.	Won NYSAC and NBA bantamweight titles
118	Win	37–5–5 (71)	Midget Smith	PTS	15	Jun 1, 1922	Madison Square Garden, New York City, New York, U.S.	
117	Win	36–5–5 (71)	Jimmy Mendo	NWS	8	Apr 20, 1922	Ice Palace, Philadelphia, Pennsylvania, U.S.	
116	Loss	36–5–5 (70)	Terry Martin	PTS	10	Apr 11, 1922	Arena, Boston, Massachusetts, U.S.	
115	Win	36–4–5 (70)	Harry Martin	PTS	15	Apr 8, 1922	Clermont Avenue Rink, New York City, New York, U.S.	
114	Win	35–4–5 (70)	Johnny Gray	PTS	12	Mar 27, 1922	Broadway Arena, New York City, New York, U.S.	
113	Win	34–4–5 (70)	Terry Martin	PTS	12	Mar 14, 1922	Marieville Gardens, North Providence, Rhode Island, U.S.	
112	Win	33–4–5 (70)	Patsy Johnson	TKO	7 (12)	Jan 13, 1922	Arena, Syracuse, New York, U.S.	
111	Win	32–4–5 (70)	Patsy Wallace	NWS	8	Jan 9, 1922	Olympia A.C., Philadelphia, Pennsylvania, U.S.	
110	Win	32–4–5 (69)	Al Walker	KO	1 (?)	Jan 2, 1922	Pioneer Sporting Club, New York City, New York, U.S.	
109	Win	31–4–5 (69)	Maxie Williamson	TKO	8 (10)	Dec 9, 1921	Pioneer Sporting Club, New York City, New York, U.S.	
108	Draw	30–4–5 (69)	Midget Smith	PTS	12	Nov 25, 1921	Madison Square Garden, New York City, New York, U.S.	
107	Loss	30–4–4 (69)	Phil O'Dowd	PTS	12	Oct 26, 1921	Lexington Avenue A.C., New York City, New York, U.S.	
106	Loss	30–3–4 (69)	Pete Herman	PTS	15	Jul 25, 1921	Ebbets Field, New York City, New York, U.S.	Lost NYSAC and NBA bantamweight titles
105	Loss	30–2–4 (69)	Joe Burman	NWS	10	Jun 28, 1921	Twin City A.C., East Chicago, Indiana, U.S.	
104	Win	30–2–4 (68)	Sammy Sandow	KO	1 (10)	Jun 21, 1921	Boxing Drome, New York City, New York, U.S.	
103	Loss	29–2–4 (68)	Memphis Pal Moore	NWS	12	May 6, 1921	Jefferson County Armory, Louisville, Kentucky, U.S.	
102	Loss	29–2–4 (67)	Young Montreal	NWS	10	Apr 8, 1921	Troop A Armory, Cleveland, Ohio, U.S.	
101	Win	29–2–4 (66)	Eddie Pinchot	NWS	10	Mar 28, 1921	Motor Square Garden, Pittsburgh, Pennsylvania, U.S.	
100	Win	29–2–4 (65)	Joe Burman	NWS	10	Mar 10, 1921	Cleveland, Ohio, U.S.	
99	Win	29–2–4 (64)	Young Montreal	NWS	10	Feb 28, 1921	Roller Palace Rink, Detroit, Michigan, U.S.	NYSAC and NBA bantamweight titles at stake; (via KO only)
98	Win	29–2–4 (63)	William Henry Vincent	NWS	8	Feb 22, 1921	National A.C., Philadelphia, Pennsylvania, U.S.	
97	Draw	29–2–4 (62)	William Henry Vincent	NWS	8	Feb 9, 1921	Coliseum, Saint Louis, Missouri, U.S.	
96	Win	29–2–4 (61)	Pete Herman	UD	15	Dec 22, 1920	Madison Square Garden, New York City, New York, U.S.	Won NYSAC bantamweight title
95	Win	28–2–4 (61)	Jackie Sharkey	KO	15 (15)	Dec 2, 1920	Madison Square Garden, New York City, New York, U.S.	
94	Win	27–2–4 (61)	Johnny Ritchie	KO	4 (12)	Nov 20, 1920	Phoenix Arena, Waterbury, Connecticut, U.S.	
93	Win	26–2–4 (61)	Abe Goldstein	KO	11 (15)	Nov 5, 1920	Madison Square Garden, New York City, New York, U.S.	Lost NBA bantamweight title; For NYSAC bantamweight title
92	Draw	25–2–4 (61)	Memphis Pal Moore	NWS	8	Oct 26, 1920	Coliseum, Saint Louis, Missouri, U.S.	
91	Draw	25–2–4 (60)	William Henry Vincent	PTS	15	Oct 15, 1920	Madison Square Garden, New York City, New York, U.S.	
90	Draw	25–2–3 (60)	Jackie Sharkey	PTS	15	Sep 28, 1920	Madison Square Garden, New York City, New York, U.S.	
89	Win	25–2–2 (60)	Johnny Fisse	TKO	6 (?)	Aug 19, 1920	Saratoga, New York, U.S.	
88	Win	24–2–2 (60)	Charles Ledoux	NWS	12	Aug 2, 1920	Armory A.A., Jersey City, New Jersey, U.S.	
87	Win	24–2–2 (59)	Harry Bramer	TKO	4 (8)	Jul 28, 1920	Battery A Arena, Saint Louis, Missouri, U.S.	
86	Win	23–2–2 (59)	Joe O'Donnell	NWS	8	Jun 7, 1920	Shibe Park, Philadelphia, Pennsylvania, U.S.	
85	Win	23–2–2 (58)	Memphis Pal Moore	NWS	12	May 24, 1920	4th Regiment Armory, Jersey City, New Jersey, U.S.	
84	Win	23–2–2 (57)	Billy Fitzsimmons	PTS	12	May 7, 1920	Driving Club, Marlborough, Massachusetts, U.S.	
83	Win	22–2–2 (57)	Kid Regan	TKO	5 (8)	Apr 29, 1920	Coliseum, Saint Louis, Missouri, U.S.	
82	Win	21–2–2 (57)	Sammy Waltz	PTS	10	Mar 8, 1920	Church Street Auditorium, Hartford, Connecticut, U.S.	
81	Win	20–2–2 (57)	Joe O'Donnell	NWS	6	Mar 6, 1920	National A.C., Philadelphia, Pennsylvania, U.S.	
80	Win	20–2–2 (56)	Eddie Siegel	TKO	3 (?)	Mar 4, 1920	Commonwealth A.A., Boston, Massachusetts, U.S.	
79	Loss	19–2–2 (56)	Hughie Hutchinson	NWS	6	Feb 21, 1920	National A.C., Philadelphia, Pennsylvania, U.S.	
78	Loss	19–2–2 (55)	Jack "Kid" Wolfe	NWS	10	Feb 18, 1920	Cleveland, Ohio, U.S.	
77	Win	19–2–2 (54)	Louisiana	NWS	6	Feb 9, 1920	Olympia A.C., Philadelphia, Pennsylvania, U.S.	
76	Win	19–2–2 (53)	Eddie Siegel	KO	3 (8)	Feb 5, 1920	City A.C., Jersey City, New Jersey, U.S.	
75	Loss	18–2–2 (53)	Joe Fox	NWS	8	Dec 22, 1919	1st Regiment Armory, Newark, New Jersey, U.S.	
74	Win	18–2–2 (52)	Jack "Kid" Wolfe	NWS	6	Nov 24, 1919	Olympia A.C., Philadelphia, Pennsylvania, U.S.	
73	Loss	18–2–2 (51)	Pete Herman	NWS	6	Nov 12, 1919	Olympia A.C., Philadelphia, Pennsylvania, U.S.	
72	Win	18–2–2 (50)	Jack "Kid" Wolfe	NWS	10	Nov 5, 1919	Arcadia Arena, Detroit, Michigan, U.S.	
71	Win	18–2–2 (49)	Joe Burman	NWS	6	Oct 25, 1919	National A.C., Philadelphia, Pennsylvania, U.S.	
70	Win	18–2–2 (48)	Dick Griffin	KO	2 (10)	Oct 11, 1919	Light Guard Armory, Detroit, Michigan, U.S.	
69	Draw	17–2–2 (48)	Joe Burman	NWS	6	Sep 29, 1919	Olympia A.C., Philadelphia, Pennsylvania, U.S.	
68	Draw	17–2–2 (47)	Frankie Mason	PTS	12	Sep 19, 1919	Albaugh Theater, Baltimore, Maryland, U.S.	
67	Win	17–2–1 (47)	Patsy Johnson	NWS	8	Sep 16, 1919	International League Ballpark, Jersey City, New Jersey, U.S.	
66	Win	17–2–1 (46)	Pete Herman	NWS	10	Sep 1, 1919	Driveway Park, Waterbury, Connecticut, U.S.	
65	Draw	17–2–1 (45)	William Henry Vincent	PTS	12	Aug 4, 1919	Fenway A.C., Boston, Massachusetts, U.S.	
64	Win	17–2 (45)	Bobby Josephs	TKO	12 (12)	Jul 7, 1919	Fenway A.C., Boston, Massachusetts, U.S.	
63	Draw	16–2 (45)	Charlie Beecher	NWS	8	Jul 4, 1919	Armory A.A., Jersey City, New Jersey, U.S.	
62	Win	16–2 (44)	Mickey Delmont	NWS	8	Jun 13, 1919	Bayonne Pavillion, Bayonne, New Jersey, U.S.	
61	Win	16–2 (43)	Joe O'Donnell	NWS	6	Jun 2, 1919	Olympia A.C., Philadelphia, Pennsylvania, U.S.	
60	Loss	16–2 (42)	Jimmy Wilde	PTS	15	Mar 31, 1919	National Sporting Club, Covent Garden, London, England, U.K.	
59	Win	16–1 (42)	Tommy Noble	PTS	25	Feb 3, 1919	National Sporting Club, Covent Garden, London, England, U.K.	
58	Win	15–1 (42)	Dick Loadman	NWS	4	Jul 16, 1918	Madison Square Garden, New York City, New York, U.S.	
57	Win	15–1 (41)	Willie Devore	NWS	10	May 30, 1918	League Park, Cleveland, Ohio, U.S.	
56	Win	15–1 (40)	Benny McNeil	KO	5 (?)	May 15, 1918	North Adams, Massachusetts, U.S.	
55	Draw	14–1 (40)	Jack "Kid" Wolfe	NWS	10	Apr 16, 1918	Cleveland Theatre (Moose Club), Cleveland, Ohio, U.S.	
54	Draw	14–1 (39)	Frankie Burns	NWS	6	Apr 6, 1918	National A.C., Philadelphia, Pennsylvania, U.S.	
53	Win	14–1 (38)	Dick Loadman	PTS	12	Apr 4, 1918	Providence, Rhode Island, U.S.	
52	Win	13–1 (38)	Fake George Kirkwood	KO	3 (?)	Apr 2, 1918	Armory, Carbondale, Pennsylvania, U.S.	
51	Draw	12–1 (38)	Eddie Wimler	NWS	6	Mar 4, 1918	Southside Market House, Pittsburgh, Pennsylvania, U.S.	
50	Win	12–1 (37)	Joe Tuber	NWS	6	Mar 2, 1918	National A.C., Philadelphia, Pennsylvania, U.S.	
49	Loss	12–1 (36)	Benny Valger	NWS	6	Feb 18, 1918	Olympia A.C., Philadelphia, Pennsylvania, U.S.	
48	Win	12–1 (35)	Kid Williams	TKO	4 (6)	Jan 29, 1918	Olympia A.C., Philadelphia, Pennsylvania, U.S.	
47	Loss	11–1 (35)	Memphis Pal Moore	PTS	12	Jan 11, 1918	Rhode Island A.C., Providence, Rhode Island, U.S.	
46	Win	11–0 (35)	Andy Burns	KO	3 (6)	Jan 1, 1918	Olympia A.C., Philadelphia, Pennsylvania, U.S.	
45	Win	10–0 (35)	Memphis Pal Moore	PTS	12	Dec 21, 1917	Rhode Island A.C., Thornton, Rhode Island, U.S.	
44	Win	9–0 (35)	Willie Astey	KO	3 (12)	Dec 7, 1917	Rhode Island A.C., Thornton, Rhode Island, U.S.	
43	Win	8–0 (35)	Terry Martin	PTS	12	Nov 29, 1917	Rhode Island A.C., Thornton, Rhode Island, U.S.	
42	Win	7–0 (35)	Eddie O'Keefe	TKO	4 (6)	Nov 26, 1917	Olympia A.C., Philadelphia, Pennsylvania, U.S.	
41	Draw	6–0 (35)	Memphis Pal Moore	NWS	10	Oct 27, 1917	Fairmont A.C., New York City, New York, U.S.	
40	Loss	6–0 (34)	Mickey Dunn	NWS	10	Oct 18, 1917	Pioneer Sporting Club, New York City, New York, U.S.	
39	Loss	6–0 (33)	Joey Leonard	NWS	10	Oct 11, 1917	Clermont Avenue Rink, New York City, New York, U.S.	
38	Loss	6–0 (32)	Frankie Daly	NWS	10	Sep 22, 1917	Fairmont A.C., New York City, New York, U.S.	
37	Win	6–0 (31)	Billy Fitzsimmons	NWS	12	Sep 10, 1917	Lenox Hall, Pittsfield, Massachusetts, U.S.	
36	Draw	6–0 (30)	Frankie Daly	NWS	10	Jul 26, 1917	Arverne A.C., Arverne, New York City, New York, U.S.	
35	Win	6–0 (29)	Willie Astey	NWS	10	Jun 16, 1917	Pioneer S.C., New York City, New York, U.S.	
34	Loss	6–0 (28)	Pete Herman	NWS	10	Jun 1, 1917	Pioneer Sporting Club, New York City, New York, U.S.	
33	Loss	6–0 (27)	Frankie Burns	NWS	10	May 15, 1917	Pioneer Sporting Club, New York City, New York, U.S.	
32	Loss	6–0 (26)	Terry Martin	NWS	10	Apr 21, 1917	Broadway S.C., New York City, New York, U.S.	
31	Loss	6–0 (25)	Dutch Brandt	NWS	10	Apr 7, 1917	Broadway S.C., New York City, New York, U.S.	
30	Draw	6–0 (24)	Kid Williams	NWS	10	Mar 13, 1917	Pioneer Sporting Club, New York City, New York, U.S.	
29	Win	6–0 (23)	Jackie Sharkey	NWS	10	Feb 27, 1917	Pioneer S.C., New York City, New York, U.S.	
28	Win	6–0 (22)	Sammy Marino	KO	3 (10)	Feb 23, 1917	Village A.C., New York City, New York, U.S.	
27	Win	5–0 (22)	One Punch Hogan	PTS	15	Feb 1, 1917	Lyric Theater, New Orleans, Louisiana, U.S.	
26	Loss	4–0 (22)	Frankie Burns	NWS	10	Dec 19, 1916	Pioneer Sporting Club, New York City, New York, U.S.	
25	Draw	4–0 (21)	Barney Adair	NWS	10	Dec 4, 1916	Olympic A.C., New York City, New York, U.S.	
24	Loss	4–0 (20)	Johnny Solzberg	NWS	10	Nov 24, 1916	Harlem S.C., New York City, New York, U.S.	
23	Win	4–0 (19)	Abe Friedman	NWS	10	Nov 20, 1916	Olympia Boxing Club, New York City, New York, U.S.	
22	Win	4–0 (18)	Benny McCoy	NWS	10	Nov 17, 1916	Village A.C., New York City, New York, U.S.	
21	Win	4–0 (17)	Willie Astey	NWS	10	Oct 23, 1916	Olympic A.C., Harlem, New York City, New York, U.S.	
20	Win	4–0 (16)	Johnny Dolan	KO	4 (10)	Oct 17, 1916	City A.C., New York City, New York, U.S.	
19	Win	3–0 (16)	Bernie Hahn	NWS	6	Oct 14, 1916	National A.C., Philadelphia, Pennsylvania, U.S.	
18	Draw	3–0 (15)	Johnny Ertle	NWS	10	Oct 10, 1916	Pioneer S.C., New York City, New York, U.S.	
17	ND	3–0 (14)	Larry Spider Murtha	ND	? (10)	Oct 2, 1916	Hudson Theatre, Schenectady, New York, U.S.	Could not find result yet
16	Win	3–0 (13)	Jackie Sharkey	NWS	10	Sep 26, 1916	Pioneer Sporting Club, New York City, New York, U.S.	
15	Win	3–0 (12)	Mickey Dunn	NWS	10	Sep 14, 1916	Empire A.C., Harlem, New York City, New York, U.S.	
14	Win	3–0 (11)	Monte Attell	KO	7 (10)	Sep 6, 1916	Pioneer Sporting Club, New York City, New York, U.S.	
13	Win	2–0 (11)	Happy Smith	NWS	10	Sep 1, 1916	Brown's Gym A.A., Far Rockaway, New York City, New York, U.S.	
12	Win	2–0 (10)	Abe Friedman	NWS	10	Aug 21, 1916	Olympic A.C., New York City, New York, U.S.	
11	Win	2–0 (9)	Bobby Hubon	KO	5 (10)	Aug 16, 1916	Pioneer Sporting Club, New York City, New York, U.S.	
10	Loss	1–0 (9)	Mickey Dunn	NWS	10	Aug 2, 1916	Pioneer Sporting Club, New York City, New York, U.S.	
9	Win	1–0 (8)	George Maas	NWS	10	Jul 22, 1916	Fairmont A.C., New York City, New York, U.S.	
8	ND	1–0 (7)	Bobby Hubon	ND	10	Jun 12, 1916	Olympic A.C., Harlem, New York City, New York, U.S.	Could not find result yet
7	Win	1–0 (6)	Willie Astey	NWS	10	May 31, 1916	Stadium A.C., New York City, New York, U.S.	
6	Win	1–0 (5)	Abe Friedman	NWS	10	May 1, 1916	Olympic A.C., Harlem, New York City, New York, U.S.	
5	Win	1–0 (4)	Willie Astey	NWS	10	Apr 22, 1916	Manhattan Opera House, New York City, New York, U.S.	
4	Win	1–0 (3)	Johnny Walsh	KO	2 (10)	Apr 17, 1916	Olympic A.C., Harlem, New York City, New York, U.S.	
3	Win	0–0 (3)	Nate Jackson	NWS	10	Apr 7, 1916	Harlem S.C., New York City, New York, U.S.	
2	Win	0–0 (2)	Freddie Walsh	NWS	10	Dec 25, 1915	Pioneer Sporting Club, New York City, New York, U.S.	
1	Win	0–0 (1)	Jack Wagner	NWS	10	Aug 21, 1915	Brown's Gym A.A., Far Rockaway, New York City, New York, U.S.	

=== Unofficial record ===
158 fights	99 wins	36 losses
By knockout	39	0
By decision	60	36
Draws	21	
No contests	2	

Record with the inclusion of newspaper decisions to the win/loss/draw column.

No.	Result	Record	Opponent	Type	Round	Date	Location	Notes
158	Win	99–36–21 (2)	Eddie Siegel	TKO	3 (8)	Dec 17, 1926	Moose Hall, Grantwood, New Jersey, U.S.	
157	Win	98–36–21 (2)	Willie Spencer	TKO	5 (10)	Oct 11, 1926	Armory, Hackensack, New Jersey, U.S.	
156	Win	97–36–21 (2)	Frankie Murray	KO	3 (10)	Sep 22, 1926	Mitchel Field Arena, Mineola, New York, U.S.	
155	Loss	96–36–21 (2)	Memphis Pal Moore	NWS	10	Mar 4, 1926	Miami Field, Miami, Florida, U.S.	
154	Draw	96–35–21 (2)	Memphis Pal Moore	PTS	10	Feb 24, 1926	Municipal Ball Park, Fort Lauderdale, Florida, U.S.	
153	Draw	96–35–20 (2)	Jackie Sharkey	PTS	4	Jul 2, 1925	Polo Grounds, New York City, New York, U.S.	
152	Loss	96–35–19 (2)	Willie Cunningham	PTS	6	May 18, 1925	Broadway Auditorium, Buffalo, New York, U.S.	
151	Draw	96–34–19 (2)	Larry Goldberg	PTS	12	May 5, 1925	Albany, New York, U.S.	
150	Loss	96–34–18 (2)	Len Brenner	UD	8	Apr 6, 1925	Fulton Opera House, Lancaster, Pennsylvania, U.S.	
149	Loss	96–33–18 (2)	Pete Sarmiento	UD	10	Sep 8, 1924	Shibe Park, Philadelphia, Pennsylvania, U.S.	
148	Loss	96–32–18 (2)	Johnny Sheppard	PTS	10	Jul 11, 1924	Arena, Boston, Massachusetts, U.S.	
147	Loss	96–31–18 (2)	Abe Goldstein	PTS	15	Mar 21, 1924	Madison Square Garden, New York City, New York, U.S.	Lost NBA bantamweight title
146	Win	96–30–18 (2)	Eddie Gorman	KO	3 (10)	Feb 4, 1924	Shreveport AC, Shreveport, Louisiana, U.S.	
145	Win	95–30–18 (2)	Paddy Owens	KO	2 (10)	Jan 23, 1924	El Dorado, Arkansas, U.S.	
144	Loss	94–30–18 (2)	Eddie McKenna	PTS	10	Jan 18, 1924	Coliseum Arena, New Orleans, Louisiana, U.S.	
143	Win	94–29–18 (2)	Earl McArthur	PTS	10	Jan 4, 1924	Auditorium, Omaha, Nebraska, U.S.	
142	Win	93–29–18 (2)	Jimmy Murphy	KO	3 (10)	Jan 1, 1924	Armory, Akron, Ohio, U.S.	
141	Win	92–29–18 (2)	Eddie Coulon	KO	3 (?)	Dec 3, 1923	1st Regiment Armory, Newark, New Jersey, U.S.	
140	Loss	91–29–18 (2)	Memphis Pal Moore	NWS	10	Nov 27, 1923	Coliseum, Saint Louis, Missouri, U.S.	
139	Win	91–28–18 (2)	Frankie Murray	TKO	5 (10)	Nov 23, 1923	Peoria, Illinois, U.S.	
138	Win	90–28–18 (2)	Eddie Siegel	KO	3 (8)	Sep 7, 1923	Shibe Park, Philadelphia, Pennsylvania, U.S.	
137	Loss	89–28–18 (2)	Harold Smith	NWS	10	Aug 31, 1923	Mullen-Sager Arena, Aurora, Illinois, U.S.	
136	Win	89–27–18 (2)	Battling Reddy	NWS	12	Aug 2, 1923	Playgrounds Stadium, West New York, New Jersey, U.S.	
135	Win	88–27–18 (2)	Patsy Johnson	KO	6 (10)	Jul 13, 1923	Erie, Pennsylvania, U.S.	
134	Draw	87–27–18 (2)	Bobby Wolgast	NWS	8	Jul 9, 1923	Shibe Park, Philadelphia, Pennsylvania, U.S.	
133	Loss	87–27–17 (2)	Young Montreal	NWS	10	May 29, 1923	Providence, Rhode Island, U.S.	
132	Win	87–26–17 (2)	Joe O'Donnell	NWS	12	Apr 10, 1923	Exposition Building, Portland, Oregon, U.S.	NYSAC and NBA bantamweight titles at stake; (via KO only)
131	Win	86–26–17 (2)	Midget Smith	NWS	10	Apr 4, 1923	Coliseum, Chicago, Illinois, U.S.	
130	Loss	85–26–17 (2)	Joe Burman	NWS	10	Mar 19, 1923	Dexter Park Pavilion, Chicago, Illinois, U.S.	
129	Loss	85–25–17 (2)	Jimmy Mendo	NWS	8	Mar 5, 1923	Arena, Philadelphia, Pennsylvania, U.S.	
128	Win	85–24–17 (2)	Pete Husic	NWS	8	Feb 27, 1923	Chestnut Street Auditorium, Harrisburg, Pennsylvania, U.S.	
127	Win	84–24–17 (2)	Midget Smith	UD	15	Dec 22, 1922	Madison Square Garden, New York City, New York, U.S.	Retained NYSAC and NBA bantamweight titles
126	Win	83–24–17 (2)	Joey Sangor	NWS	10	Dec 7, 1922	Auditorium, Milwaukee, Wisconsin, U.S.	
125	Win	82–24–17 (2)	Frankie Daly	NWS	10	Nov 30, 1922	Tomlinson Hall, Indianapolis, Indiana, U.S.	
124	Win	81–24–17 (2)	Benny Schwartz	KO	5 (12)	Nov 24, 1922	Memorial Hall, Springfield, Ohio, U.S.	Retained NYSAC and NBA bantamweight titles
123	Loss	80–24–17 (2)	Jack "Kid" Wolfe	UD	15	Sep 21, 1922	Madison Square Garden, New York City, New York, U.S.	For inaugural world junior-featherweight title
122	Win	80–23–17 (2)	Memphis Pal Moore	NWS	12	Sep 4, 1922	Floyd Fitzsimmons' Arena, Michigan City, Indiana, U.S.	
121	Win	79–23–17 (2)	Ben Levy	KO	4 (12)	Aug 24, 1922	Stockyards Arena, Fort Worth, Texas, U.S.	
120	Win	78–23–17 (2)	Frankie Murray	KO	6 (15)	Aug 21, 1922	Pierre Avenue Arena, Shreveport, Louisiana, U.S.	Retained NYSAC, NBA, and USA Louisiana State bantamweight titles
119	Win	77–23–17 (2)	Johnny Buff	TKO	14 (15)	Jul 10, 1922	Velodrome, New York City, New York, U.S.	Won NYSAC and NBA bantamweight titles
118	Win	76–23–17 (2)	Midget Smith	PTS	15	Jun 1, 1922	Madison Square Garden, New York City, New York, U.S.	
117	Win	75–23–17 (2)	Jimmy Mendo	NWS	8	Apr 20, 1922	Ice Palace, Philadelphia, Pennsylvania, U.S.	
116	Loss	74–23–17 (2)	Terry Martin	PTS	10	Apr 11, 1922	Arena, Boston, Massachusetts, U.S.	
115	Win	74–22–17 (2)	Harry Martin	PTS	15	Apr 8, 1922	Clermont Avenue Rink, New York City, New York, U.S.	
114	Win	73–22–17 (2)	Johnny Gray	PTS	12	Mar 27, 1922	Broadway Arena, New York City, New York, U.S.	
113	Win	72–22–17 (2)	Terry Martin	PTS	12	Mar 14, 1922	Marieville Gardens, North Providence, Rhode Island, U.S.	
112	Win	71–22–17 (2)	Patsy Johnson	TKO	7 (12)	Jan 13, 1922	Arena, Syracuse, New York, U.S.	
111	Win	70–22–17 (2)	Patsy Wallace	NWS	8	Jan 9, 1922	Olympia A.C., Philadelphia, Pennsylvania, U.S.	
110	Win	69–22–17 (2)	Al Walker	KO	1 (?)	Jan 2, 1922	Pioneer Sporting Club, New York City, New York, U.S.	
109	Win	68–22–17 (2)	Maxie Williamson	TKO	8 (10)	Dec 9, 1921	Pioneer Sporting Club, New York City, New York, U.S.	
108	Draw	67–22–17 (2)	Midget Smith	PTS	12	Nov 25, 1921	Madison Square Garden, New York City, New York, U.S.	
107	Loss	67–22–16 (2)	Phil O'Dowd	PTS	12	Oct 26, 1921	Lexington Avenue A.C., New York City, New York, U.S.	
106	Loss	67–21–16 (2)	Pete Herman	PTS	15	Jul 25, 1921	Ebbets Field, New York City, New York, U.S.	Lost NYSAC and NBA bantamweight titles
105	Loss	67–20–16 (2)	Joe Burman	NWS	10	Jun 28, 1921	Twin City A.C., East Chicago, Indiana, U.S.	
104	Win	67–19–16 (2)	Sammy Sandow	KO	1 (10)	Jun 21, 1921	Boxing Drome, New York City, New York, U.S.	
103	Loss	66–19–16 (2)	Memphis Pal Moore	NWS	12	May 6, 1921	Jefferson County Armory, Louisville, Kentucky, U.S.	
102	Loss	66–18–16 (2)	Young Montreal	NWS	10	Apr 8, 1921	Troop A Armory, Cleveland, Ohio, U.S.	
101	Win	66–17–16 (2)	Eddie Pinchot	NWS	10	Mar 28, 1921	Motor Square Garden, Pittsburgh, Pennsylvania, U.S.	
100	Win	65–17–16 (2)	Joe Burman	NWS	10	Mar 10, 1921	Cleveland, Ohio, U.S.	
99	Win	64–17–16 (2)	Young Montreal	NWS	10	Feb 28, 1921	Roller Palace Rink, Detroit, Michigan, U.S.	NYSAC and NBA bantamweight titles at stake; (via KO only)
98	Win	63–17–16 (2)	William Henry Vincent	NWS	8	Feb 22, 1921	National A.C., Philadelphia, Pennsylvania, U.S.	
97	Draw	62–17–16 (2)	William Henry Vincent	NWS	8	Feb 9, 1921	Coliseum, Saint Louis, Missouri, U.S.	
96	Win	62–17–15 (2)	Pete Herman	UD	15	Dec 22, 1920	Madison Square Garden, New York City, New York, U.S.	Won NYSAC bantamweight title
95	Win	61–17–15 (2)	Jackie Sharkey	KO	15 (15)	Dec 2, 1920	Madison Square Garden, New York City, New York, U.S.	
94	Win	60–17–15 (2)	Johnny Ritchie	KO	4 (12)	Nov 20, 1920	Phoenix Arena, Waterbury, Connecticut, U.S.	
93	Win	59–17–15 (2)	Abe Goldstein	KO	11 (15)	Nov 5, 1920	Madison Square Garden, New York City, New York, U.S.	
92	Draw	58–17–15 (2)	Memphis Pal Moore	NWS	8	Oct 26, 1920	Coliseum, Saint Louis, Missouri, U.S.	
91	Draw	58–17–14 (2)	William Henry Vincent	PTS	15	Oct 15, 1920	Madison Square Garden, New York City, New York, U.S.	
90	Draw	58–17–13 (2)	Jackie Sharkey	PTS	15	Sep 28, 1920	Madison Square Garden, New York City, New York, U.S.	
89	Win	58–17–12 (2)	Johnny Fisse	TKO	6 (?)	Aug 19, 1920	Saratoga, New York, U.S.	
88	Win	57–17–12 (2)	Charles Ledoux	NWS	12	Aug 2, 1920	Armory A.A., Jersey City, New Jersey, U.S.	
87	Win	56–17–12 (2)	Harry Bramer	TKO	4 (8)	Jul 28, 1920	Battery A Arena, Saint Louis, Missouri, U.S.	
86	Win	55–17–12 (2)	Joe O'Donnell	NWS	8	Jun 7, 1920	Shibe Park, Philadelphia, Pennsylvania, U.S.	
85	Win	54–17–12 (2)	Memphis Pal Moore	NWS	12	May 24, 1920	4th Regiment Armory, Jersey City, New Jersey, U.S.	
84	Win	53–17–12 (2)	Billy Fitzsimmons	PTS	12	May 7, 1920	Driving Club, Marlborough, Massachusetts, U.S.	
83	Win	52–17–12 (2)	Kid Regan	TKO	5 (8)	Apr 29, 1920	Coliseum, Saint Louis, Missouri, U.S.	
82	Win	51–17–12 (2)	Sammy Waltz	PTS	10	Mar 8, 1920	Church Street Auditorium, Hartford, Connecticut, U.S.	
81	Win	50–17–12 (2)	Joe O'Donnell	NWS	6	Mar 6, 1920	National A.C., Philadelphia, Pennsylvania, U.S.	
80	Win	49–17–12 (2)	Eddie Siegel	TKO	3 (?)	Mar 4, 1920	Commonwealth A.A., Boston, Massachusetts, U.S.	
79	Loss	48–17–12 (2)	Hughie Hutchinson	NWS	6	Feb 21, 1920	National A.C., Philadelphia, Pennsylvania, U.S.	
78	Loss	48–16–12 (2)	Jack "Kid" Wolfe	NWS	10	Feb 18, 1920	Cleveland, Ohio, U.S.	
77	Win	48–15–12 (2)	Louisiana	NWS	6	Feb 9, 1920	Olympia A.C., Philadelphia, Pennsylvania, U.S.	
76	Win	47–15–12 (2)	Eddie Siegel	KO	3 (8)	Feb 5, 1920	City A.C., Jersey City, New Jersey, U.S.	
75	Loss	46–15–12 (2)	Joe Fox	NWS	8	Dec 22, 1919	1st Regiment Armory, Newark, New Jersey, U.S.	
74	Win	46–14–12 (2)	Jack "Kid" Wolfe	NWS	6	Nov 24, 1919	Olympia A.C., Philadelphia, Pennsylvania, U.S.	
73	Loss	45–14–12 (2)	Pete Herman	NWS	6	Nov 12, 1919	Olympia A.C., Philadelphia, Pennsylvania, U.S.	
72	Win	45–13–12 (2)	Jack "Kid" Wolfe	NWS	10	Nov 5, 1919	Arcadia Arena, Detroit, Michigan, U.S.	
71	Win	44–13–12 (2)	Joe Burman	NWS	6	Oct 25, 1919	National A.C., Philadelphia, Pennsylvania, U.S.	
70	Win	43–13–12 (2)	Dick Griffin	KO	2 (10)	Oct 11, 1919	Light Guard Armory, Detroit, Michigan, U.S.	
69	Draw	42–13–12 (2)	Joe Burman	NWS	6	Sep 29, 1919	Olympia A.C., Philadelphia, Pennsylvania, U.S.	
68	Draw	42–13–11 (2)	Frankie Mason	PTS	12	Sep 19, 1919	Albaugh Theater, Baltimore, Maryland, U.S.	
67	Win	42–13–10 (2)	Patsy Johnson	NWS	8	Sep 16, 1919	International League Ballpark, Jersey City, New Jersey, U.S.	
66	Win	41–13–10 (2)	Pete Herman	NWS	10	Sep 1, 1919	Driveway Park, Waterbury, Connecticut, U.S.	
65	Draw	40–13–10 (2)	William Henry Vincent	PTS	12	Aug 4, 1919	Fenway A.C., Boston, Massachusetts, U.S.	
64	Win	40–13–9 (2)	Bobby Josephs	TKO	12 (12)	Jul 7, 1919	Fenway A.C., Boston, Massachusetts, U.S.	
63	Draw	39–13–9 (2)	Charlie Beecher	NWS	8	Jul 4, 1919	Armory A.A., Jersey City, New Jersey, U.S.	
62	Win	39–13–8 (2)	Mickey Delmont	NWS	8	Jun 13, 1919	Bayonne Pavillion, Bayonne, New Jersey, U.S.	
61	Win	38–13–8 (2)	Joe O'Donnell	NWS	6	Jun 2, 1919	Olympia A.C., Philadelphia, Pennsylvania, U.S.	
60	Loss	37–13–8 (2)	Jimmy Wilde	PTS	15	Mar 31, 1919	National Sporting Club, Covent Garden, London, England, U.K.	
59	Win	37–12–8 (2)	Tommy Noble	PTS	25	Feb 3, 1919	National Sporting Club, Covent Garden, London, England, U.K.	
58	Win	36–12–8 (2)	Dick Loadman	NWS	4	Jul 16, 1918	Madison Square Garden, New York City, New York, U.S.	
57	Win	35–12–8 (2)	Willie Devore	NWS	10	May 30, 1918	League Park, Cleveland, Ohio, U.S.	
56	Win	34–12–8 (2)	Benny McNeil	KO	5 (?)	May 15, 1918	North Adams, Massachusetts, U.S.	
55	Draw	33–12–8 (2)	Jack "Kid" Wolfe	NWS	10	Apr 16, 1918	Cleveland Theatre (Moose Club), Cleveland, Ohio, U.S.	
54	Draw	33–12–7 (2)	Frankie Burns	NWS	6	Apr 6, 1918	National A.C., Philadelphia, Pennsylvania, U.S.	
53	Win	33–12–6 (2)	Dick Loadman	PTS	12	Apr 4, 1918	Providence, Rhode Island, U.S.	
52	Win	32–12–6 (2)	Fake George Kirkwood	KO	3 (?)	Apr 2, 1918	Armory, Carbondale, Pennsylvania, U.S.	
51	Draw	31–12–6 (2)	Eddie Wimler	NWS	6	Mar 4, 1918	Southside Market House, Pittsburgh, Pennsylvania, U.S.	
50	Win	31–12–5 (2)	Joe Tuber	NWS	6	Mar 2, 1918	National A.C., Philadelphia, Pennsylvania, U.S.	
49	Loss	30–12–5 (2)	Benny Valger	NWS	6	Feb 18, 1918	Olympia A.C., Philadelphia, Pennsylvania, U.S.	
48	Win	30–11–5 (2)	Kid Williams	TKO	4 (6)	Jan 29, 1918	Olympia A.C., Philadelphia, Pennsylvania, U.S.	
47	Loss	29–11–5 (2)	Memphis Pal Moore	PTS	12	Jan 11, 1918	Rhode Island A.C., Providence, Rhode Island, U.S.	
46	Win	29–10–5 (2)	Andy Burns	KO	3 (6)	Jan 1, 1918	Olympia A.C., Philadelphia, Pennsylvania, U.S.	
45	Win	28–10–5 (2)	Memphis Pal Moore	PTS	12	Dec 21, 1917	Rhode Island A.C., Thornton, Rhode Island, U.S.	
44	Win	27–10–5 (2)	Willie Astey	KO	3 (12)	Dec 7, 1917	Rhode Island A.C., Thornton, Rhode Island, U.S.	
43	Win	26–10–5 (2)	Terry Martin	PTS	12	Nov 29, 1917	Rhode Island A.C., Thornton, Rhode Island, U.S.	
42	Win	25–10–5 (2)	Eddie O'Keefe	TKO	4 (6)	Nov 26, 1917	Olympia A.C., Philadelphia, Pennsylvania, U.S.	
41	Draw	24–10–5 (2)	Memphis Pal Moore	NWS	10	Oct 27, 1917	Fairmont A.C., New York City, New York, U.S.	
40	Loss	24–10–4 (2)	Mickey Dunn	NWS	10	Oct 18, 1917	Pioneer Sporting Club, New York City, New York, U.S.	
39	Loss	24–9–4 (2)	Joey Leonard	NWS	10	Oct 11, 1917	Clermont Avenue Rink, New York City, New York, U.S.	
38	Loss	24–8–4 (2)	Frankie Daly	NWS	10	Sep 22, 1917	Fairmont A.C., New York City, New York, U.S.	
37	Win	24–7–4 (2)	Billy Fitzsimmons	NWS	12	Sep 10, 1917	Lenox Hall, Pittsfield, Massachusetts, U.S.	
36	Draw	23–7–4 (2)	Frankie Daly	NWS	10	Jul 26, 1917	Arverne A.C., Arverne, New York City, New York, U.S.	
35	Win	23–7–3 (2)	Willie Astey	NWS	10	Jun 16, 1917	Pioneer S.C., New York City, New York, U.S.	
34	Loss	22–7–3 (2)	Pete Herman	NWS	10	Jun 1, 1917	Pioneer Sporting Club, New York City, New York, U.S.	
33	Loss	22–6–3 (2)	Frankie Burns	NWS	10	May 15, 1917	Pioneer Sporting Club, New York City, New York, U.S.	
32	Loss	22–5–3 (2)	Terry Martin	NWS	10	Apr 21, 1917	Broadway S.C., New York City, New York, U.S.	
31	Loss	22–4–3 (2)	Dutch Brandt	NWS	10	Apr 7, 1917	Broadway S.C., New York City, New York, U.S.	
30	Draw	22–3–3 (2)	Kid Williams	NWS	10	Mar 13, 1917	Pioneer Sporting Club, New York City, New York, U.S.	
29	Win	22–3–2 (2)	Jackie Sharkey	NWS	10	Feb 27, 1917	Pioneer S.C., New York City, New York, U.S.	
28	Win	21–3–2 (2)	Sammy Marino	KO	3 (10)	Feb 23, 1917	Village A.C., New York City, New York, U.S.	
27	Win	20–3–2 (2)	One Punch Hogan	PTS	15	Feb 1, 1917	Lyric Theater, New Orleans, Louisiana, U.S.	
26	Loss	19–3–2 (2)	Frankie Burns	NWS	10	Dec 19, 1916	Pioneer Sporting Club, New York City, New York, U.S.	
25	Draw	19–2–2 (2)	Barney Adair	NWS	10	Dec 4, 1916	Olympic A.C., New York City, New York, U.S.	
24	Loss	19–2–1 (2)	Johnny Solzberg	NWS	10	Nov 24, 1916	Harlem S.C., New York City, New York, U.S.	
23	Win	19–1–1 (2)	Abe Friedman	NWS	10	Nov 20, 1916	Olympia Boxing Club, New York City, New York, U.S.	
22	Win	18–1–1 (2)	Benny McCoy	NWS	10	Nov 17, 1916	Village A.C., New York City, New York, U.S.	
21	Win	17–1–1 (2)	Willie Astey	NWS	10	Oct 23, 1916	Olympic A.C., Harlem, New York City, New York, U.S.	
20	Win	16–1–1 (2)	Johnny Dolan	KO	4 (10)	Oct 17, 1916	City A.C., New York City, New York, U.S.	
19	Win	15–1–1 (2)	Bernie Hahn	NWS	6	Oct 14, 1916	National A.C., Philadelphia, Pennsylvania, U.S.	
18	Draw	14–1–1 (2)	Johnny Ertle	NWS	10	Oct 10, 1916	Pioneer S.C., New York City, New York, U.S.	
17	ND	14–1 (2)	Larry Spider Murtha	ND	? (10)	Oct 2, 1916	Hudson Theatre, Schenectady, New York, U.S.	Could not find result yet
16	Win	14–1 (1)	Jackie Sharkey	NWS	10	Sep 26, 1916	Pioneer Sporting Club, New York City, New York, U.S.	
15	Win	13–1 (1)	Mickey Dunn	NWS	10	Sep 14, 1916	Empire A.C., Harlem, New York City, New York, U.S.	
14	Win	12–1 (1)	Monte Attell	KO	7 (10)	Sep 6, 1916	Pioneer Sporting Club, New York City, New York, U.S.	
13	Win	11–1 (1)	Happy Smith	NWS	10	Sep 1, 1916	Brown's Gym A.A., Far Rockaway, New York City, New York, U.S.	
12	Win	10–1 (1)	Abe Friedman	NWS	10	Aug 21, 1916	Olympic A.C., New York City, New York, U.S.	
11	Win	9–1 (1)	Bobby Hubon	KO	5 (10)	Aug 16, 1916	Pioneer Sporting Club, New York City, New York, U.S.	
10	Loss	8–1 (1)	Mickey Dunn	NWS	10	Aug 2, 1916	Pioneer Sporting Club, New York City, New York, U.S.	
9	Win	8–0 (1)	George Maas	NWS	10	Jul 22, 1916	Fairmont A.C., New York City, New York, U.S.	
8	ND	7–0 (1)	Bobby Hubon	ND	10	Jun 12, 1916	Olympic A.C., Harlem, New York City, New York, U.S.	Could not find result yet
7	Win	7–0	Willie Astey	NWS	10	May 31, 1916	Stadium A.C., New York City, New York, U.S.	
6	Win	6–0	Abe Friedman	NWS	10	May 1, 1916	Olympic A.C., Harlem, New York City, New York, U.S.	
5	Win	5–0	Willie Astey	NWS	10	Apr 22, 1916	Manhattan Opera House, New York City, New York, U.S.	
4	Win	4–0	Johnny Walsh	KO	2 (10)	Apr 17, 1916	Olympic A.C., Harlem, New York City, New York, U.S.	
3	Win	3–0	Nate Jackson	NWS	10	Apr 7, 1916	Harlem S.C., New York City, New York, U.S.	
2	Win	2–0	Freddie Walsh	NWS	10	Dec 25, 1915	Pioneer Sporting Club, New York City, New York, U.S.	
1	Win	1–0	Jack Wagner	NWS	10	Aug 21, 1915	Brown's Gym A.A., Far Rockaway, New York City, New York, U.S.	

== Titles in boxing ==
=== Major world titles ===
- NYSAC bantamweight champion (118 lbs)
- NBA (WBA) bantamweight champion (Note: Inaugural champion.) (118 lbs)

=== Regional/International titles ===
- Louisiana State bantamweight champion (118 lbs)

=== Undisputed titles ===
- Undisputed bantamweight champion

== See also ==
- Boxing in the 1920s

== Notes and references ==
=== References ===
Achievements
Preceded by Kid Herman	World Bantamweight Champion; December 22, 1920 – July 25, 1921	Succeeded by Kid Herman
Preceded by Johnny Buff	World Bantamweight Champion; July 10, 1922 – March 21, 1924	Succeeded by Abe Goldstein
