= Joseph B. Lynch =

Religious leader from Virginia, US

Joseph Barnard Lynch (1840 – September 3, 1900) was an American religious leader on Chincoteague Island, Virginia, who in 1892 founded the Christ's Sanctified Holy Church movement. Lynch had been a class leader in the Methodist church, but following an 1887 angelic vision became convinced that salvation was impossible without Holiness (cf. Holiness movement). Lynch was rejected from the Methodist church for his belief, along with his growing number of followers. The movement established by him and his colleague Sarah Collins (sanctified in 1889) became known as the Sanctified Band, Sanctification Band, or Lynchites.

The group drew attention for its unusual practices: they lived in houseboats based on the Biblical Ark. The community's belief in sanctification was taken to mean that acts that would normally be sinful are not sinful to the sanctified, and thus they had customs which their neighbors interpreted as free love and bigamy such as the "watch mate" practice where spouses from different married couples would spend time alone together. Members of the movement were killed by local vigilantes, and Lynch, Collins, and two other men were arrested for free love offenses, and jailed and fined by the authorities. There precipitated a migration of Lynch's followers out of the area, selling their possessions and relocating to other Southern states.

Lynch died in Fernandina, Florida of typhoid fever in 1900.

== Movement today ==
The movement, Christ's Sanctified Holy Church, continues to exist in parts of the Southern United States.
