= Curly Wilshur =

Canadian boxer (1901-1962)

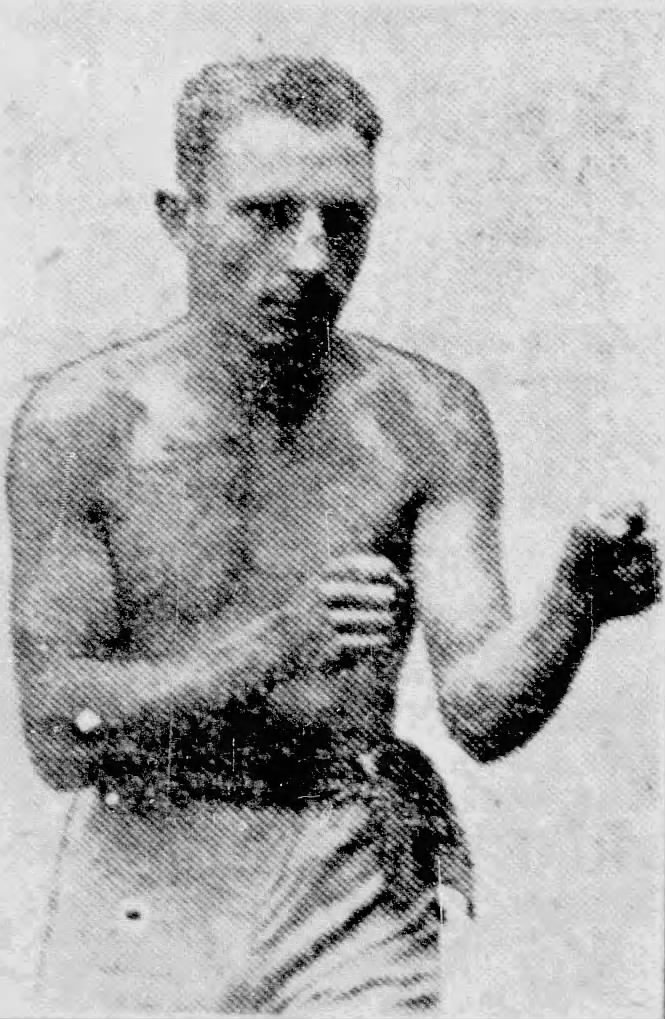

Personal information
- Nickname: The Canadian Ghost
- Nationality: (Canada) Canadian
- Born: Barney Eisenberg; 1901 London, England
- Died: November 8, 1962 (aged 60–61) Toronto, Ontario, Canada
- Height: 5 ft 6½ in (169cm)
- Weight: Featherweight

Boxing career

Boxing record
- Total fights: 73
- Wins: 34
- Win by KO: 3
- Losses: 27
- Draws: 12

Curly Wilshur (born Barney Eisenberg; 1901 – November 8, 1962) was a British-born Canadian professional featherweight boxer who became the featherweight boxing champion of Canada in 1923.

== Early life ==
Barney Eisenberg (or Isenberg) was born in London, England, in 1901.

His family migrated from the East End of London to Toronto, Ontario, when he was 13. He quickly found work as a printer's apprentice, earning four dollars per week, but after a printer's strike, he began to pursue boxing.

== Professional boxing career ==
Eisenberg fought professionally during the 1920s under the ring name of Curly Wilshur. Nicknamed Curly, he formed his ring name from his mother's surname, Wiltshire, though most newspapers published it as Wilshur.

He turned pro under manager Phil "Darkey" Daniels. Known for his remarkable speed and elusive style, he earned the nickname "The Canadian Ghost."

From 1919 to 1922, he had 10 fights with Toronto's Benny Gould, future featherweight titleholder. He went 3-2-5.

He kicked off a rivalry with Eddie Pinchot in April 1922, fighting to a 10-round draw and being outpointed in the May rematch.

He faced future world bantamweight champion Charley Phil Rosenberg at Madison Square Garden in December 1922 and won the six-round bout on points.

In January 1923, he lost to Midget Smith by majority decision at the Toronto Coliseum. Ahead on points through eight rounds, Wilshur was overtaken late by Smith in their bout, with Smith's ninth-round rally and stronger finish securing the decision.

In his next fight, he fought Eddie Pinchot to a stalemate at the Gayety Theatre in Toronto.

He signed to face Canadian bantamweight champion Bobby Eber in a 10-round non-title bout in March 1923. With the judges split, referee Lou Marsh awarded the fight to Wilshur based on his performance in the final rounds.

His win over Eber lined up a title match with Leo "Kid" Roy, then the featherweight champion of Canada. He suffered a TKO loss in the second round of the championship bout against Roy. After bouncing back with a win over George Gerardin, he challenged for the featherweight title again.

=== Taking the Canadian featherweight championship, September 1923 ===
Curly Wilshur won the Canadian featherweight championship on September 21, 1923, defeating Montreal's Leo "Kid" Roy by majority decision.

Wilshur made a successful defense of the newly won Canadian featherweight title against British featherweight champion Joe Fox at the Arena Gardens in October 1923.

=== Losing the Canadian featherweight championship, November 1923 ===
On November 2, 1923, he lost the Canadian featherweight title while defending it against world junior featherweight champion Benny Gould. Wilshur took three out of ten rounds of the title fight held at the Coliseum in Toronto.

Days after losing his championship, he dropped a decision to Leo "Kid" Roy at the St. Denis Theatre in Montreal on November 14, 1923, marking their third bout.

He fought Bobby Garcia, featherweight champion of the Army at Pittsburgh's Motor Square Garden. The 10-round bout resulted in a newspaper decision in Wilshur's favor.

When Wilshur and Leo "Kid" Roy met for the fourth time at the Toronto Coliseum in February 1924, referee Lou Marsh gave the nod to Roy following a split verdict from the judges. After a draw against Roy Chisholm, he was defeated by Sylvio Mireault in April 1924.

Wilshur traveled to Australia in August 1924 for a series of bouts at the West Melbourne Stadium, facing Bert Spargo, Ansel Bell, and Ben Martin. He was defeated in all three fights.

His professional career concluded with a points win over Joe Scully in May 1927 in Detroit.

== Professional boxing record ==
73 fights	34 wins	27 losses
By knockout	3	5
By decision	31	22
Draws	12	

== Death ==
Curly Wilshur died on November 8, 1962, in Toronto, Ontario, Canada.
