= Benny Gould =

Canadian boxer

Personal information
- Nickname: Kid Gold
- Nationality: (Canada) Canadian
- Born: Benny Gould Russia
- Occupation: Boxer
- Height: 5 ft 5 in (165cm)
- Weight: Featherweight

Boxing career

Boxing record
- Total fights: 64
- Wins: 24
- Win by KO: 5
- Losses: 27
- Draws: 12

Benny Gould, nicknamed Kid Gold, was a Russian-born Jewish-Canadian professional featherweight boxer who held the Canadian featherweight boxing championship from 1923 to 1924.

== Early life ==
Benny Gould, a Jewish boy, was born in Russia before moving with his family to Toronto, Canada.

Orphaned in his youth, Gould worked as a Toronto newsboy and became well known in the city.

== Amateur boxing career ==
Gould fought an amateur boxing match on January 12, 1918, in Pittsburgh.

== Professional career ==
Benny Gould started his pro boxing career in Guelph, Ontario, in 1919. He came under the management of Phil "Darkey" Daniels.

In December 1920, he fought Canadian bantamweight champion Bobby Eber, who stepped in for Memphis Pal Moore on short notice for a catchweight bout. He outpointed Eber in the 10-round bout.

The Toronto fighter fought world bantamweight contender Joe Burman in November 1921. He was outpointed by Burman over 10 rounds.

After splitting from manager Darkey Daniels in late 1921, he was matched against ex-stablemate Curly Wilshur, who fought under Daniels. He lost a unanimous decision to Wilshur after going the distance in the main event at Toronto's Civic Arena on February 6, 1922.

With backing from Toronto businessmen, he relocated to New York during the spring of 1922, where he began to rebuild his reputation. He became part of Billy Gibson's stable and benefited from the guidance of Benny Leonard, the world lightweight champion who acted as his mentor.

=== Taking the World Jr. featherweight championship, December 1922 ===
Gould's performance against Frankie Edwards in September 1922 caught the attention of George Pagonis, who had amassed a fortune in the hair oil industry and sought to develop a world champion. Pagonis acquired Gould's managerial contract from Billy Gibson. Backed by Pagonis, he challenged reigning champion Jack "Kid" Wolfe for a nominal purse of one dollar, with his sole aim being a shot at the world championship. Gould claimed the world junior featherweight title after defeating Wolfe in Toronto on December 26, 1922. With one judge scoring for Gould and the other declaring a draw, referee Lou Marsh rendered the final decision in Gould's favor.

In April 1923, he fought Mike Dundee at the Pioneer Sporting Club in New York. Gould's jaw was fractured in the first round, but he continued on until an eighth-round technical knockout. He was taken to the hospital after the bout. Gould's millionaire backer and manager, George Pagonis, secured treatment from a specialist for his damaged jaw, spending several hundred dollars on the repair. Gould spent two months drinking through a tube with his jaws wired shut, but by October he had resumed training. He came under the training of Sammy Chapman, who was selected by Pagonis. He trained at Stillman's Gym in New York.

=== Taking the Canadian featherweight championship, November 1923 ===
On November 2, 1923, the world junior featherweight titleholder faced Curly Wilshur in a rematch, with Wilshur's Canadian featherweight title at stake. He scored a ten-round decision over Wilshur before a crowd at the Toronto Coliseum. He brought both titles back to New York with him.

Leading up to his next bout, the featherweight champion served as a sparring partner for Abe Goldstein, helping prepare Goldstein for his title fight against Joe Lynch while readying himself for his own title defense.

=== Losing the Canadian featherweight championship, March 1924 ===
He put his title on the line against former featherweight champion Leo "Kid" Roy on March 25, 1924. He suffered a ten-round decision loss in Toronto following his failure to make the agreed weight of 126 pounds. The fight marked his last bout in Canada.

He faced Joe Glick at the Camden Convention Hall on February 5, 1926.

His last career fight resulted in a loss to Gene Johnson in May 1928 at Thompson Stadium in Staten Island.

== Professional boxing record ==
| 63 fights | 24 wins | 27 losses |
|---|---|---|
| By knockout | 5 | 4 |
| By decision | 19 | 23 |
| Draws | 12 | |

Achievements
| Preceded by Curly Wilshur | Canadian Featherweight Champion; November 2, 1923 – March 25, 1924 | Succeeded by Leo "Kid" Roy |
