= Jack "Kid" Wolfe =

American boxer

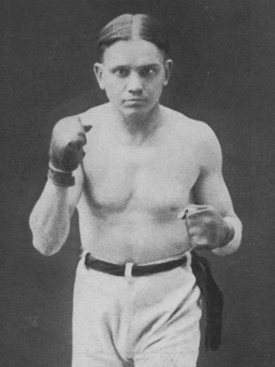
- Wolfe circa 1922

Personal information
- Nationality: American
- Born: Jackson Kenneth Wolfe; June 11, 1895 Russian Empire
- Died: April 22, 1975 (aged 79)
- Height: 5 ft 2 in (1.57 m)
- Weight: Junior featherweight

Boxing career
- Stance: Orthodox

Boxing record
- Total fights: 138; with the inclusion of newspaper decisions
- Wins: 81
- Win by KO: 11
- Losses: 28
- Draws: 26
- No contests: 3

Jack "Kid" Wolfe, (June 11, 1895 – April 22, 1975) was an American professional boxer. He was the first World Champion in the junior-featherweight division. During his career he had newspaper-decision victories over reigning bantamweight champions Johnny Ertle, Joe Lynch, Kid Williams, and Pete Herman, and fought future lightweight champion Sammie Mandell. Wolfe also fought the talented boxers Frankie Jerome, 1918 world bantamweight champion Memphis Pal Moore, Young Montreal, Pete Zivic, Dick Loadman, Al Shubert, John "K.O." Eggers, Terry Martin, Danny Frush, and Eddie O'Dowd.

== Early life and career ==
Wolfe was born in Russia on June 11, 1895, according to his hometown paper, The Cleveland Leader. As a sideline, in his youth and early boxing days, Wolfe worked selling newspapers, like many great boxers of the era. Turning professional in 1911, the 5' 2" Wolfe, who was managed by Tommy McGinty and the very capable Jimmy Dunn, fought mostly as a bantamweight in the Cleveland area. One of his local rivals was Cal Delaney, whom he met three times in close fights early in his career.

By 1913, Wolfe started venturing out to New York City and other cities, to take on more nationally known battlers. A few of the men he met in New York City were Kid Herman, Willie Doyle, and Eddie O'Keefe. By late 1916, he was back fighting mostly in Cleveland and averaging one fight per month. Local promoters did not hesitate to put him on a card, as he was an active fighter who "gave it his all.

On December 11, 1915, Wolfe defeated talented southpaw Johnny Eggers, in a five-round disqualification at the Fairmont Athletic Club in the Bronx. Wolfe had previously beaten Eggers in a newspaper decision of February 8, 1913, in New York City.

=== Early career bouts with Al Shubert and Dick Loadman, 1917-18 ===
In a well publicized match on January 22, 1917, Wolfe defeated Al Shubert in Baltimore in a fifteen-round points decision. In a close, but exciting match, many in the crowd believed Shubert, future holder of the New England Featherweight title, should have won by a shade. From the eleventh through the fifteenth, Wolfe had the cleaner punches, and they were sufficient to tip the judges' decision in his favor. Wolfe's switch from uppercuts to head shots with his right in the later rounds, opened Shubert to blows from his left and subsequent combinations. Wolfe succeeded best in the twelfth through fifteenth, where he secured his tight margin of victory. He was an underdog against the more aggressive Shubert and made a showing that extended his reputation West of the Buckeye State.

On March 2, 1917, Wolfe defeated Dick Loadman in an important fifteen round points decision at the Monumental Theatre in Baltimore. Wolfe had the better of ten rounds, one was even, and Loadman led in only four. Jack boxed with great science, and the match was a speedy one throughout. Loadman was the harder hitter, but Wolfe used ducking and side-stepping to effectively dodge his blows, usually causing them to fall wide of their mark. In the first six rounds, Wolfe suffered a consistent body attack, but in the remaining rounds, showing greater endurance, he grew stronger, and more effectively took the fighting to Loadman. Jack used his right cross to counter many of Loadman's advances, and was particularly effective with his left jab. Loadman fought many of the best bantams of the era, but had a poor record against them. Many reporters ringside felt Wolfe had the skills to soon face Pete Herman, bantam champion, but it would be weeks before a match could be arranged. Loadman would lose to Wolfe again in both 1918 and 1919. In their October 7, 1918, bout in Cleveland, Wolfe won in a ten-round newspaper decision of the Pittsburgh Post. Showing versatility, Wolfe used uppercuts and short arm jolts to repel the infighting of Loadman, who had expected a long range attack by Wolfe. Wolfe was credited with six rounds. In their January 6, 1919, bout, Wolfe defeated Loadman in a ten-round newspaper decision in Detroit. One reporter wrote, "it was Wolfe's fight all the way", though both boxers remained on their feet throughout. One source wrote that Loadman landed three blows to Dickman's one.

On March 12, 1917, Wolfe defeated Italian featherweight Terry Martin in Baltimore in a fifteen-round bout. The fighting was fierce and described as "sensational". Martin was said to have given a valiant showing in the ring. On May 30, 1921, Martin would win a close twelve round bout on a judge's decision in Rhode Island against Wolfe. Wolfe would lose to Martin again in a twelve-round newspaper decision in Jersey City on February 5, 1923. Martin took the lead from the opening rounds. In an awkward bout, Wolfe was wary of Martin and unable or unwilling to attack his defenses, while Martin scored far more punches than his opponent. Martin would fight top talent in his career. Martin's skill and two inch height advantage was a concern to Wolfe, who was particularly wary and sometimes awkward against taller boxers with longer reach.

== Two victories over a bantamweight champion, Johnny Ertle, 1918 ==
On January 5, 1918, Wolfe scored a ten-round win by newspaper decision over reigning World Bantamweight champion Johnny Ertle in Cleveland, Ohio. Wolfe was the aggressor throughout the bout and most newspapers gave Wolfe six or seven of the ten rounds. If the bout had been judged on points, as they are today, Wolfe would have taken the world bantamweight championship. On December 7, 1917, Wolfe had previously defeated Ertle while he was reigning World Bantamweight Champion in a ten-round newspaper decision for a Soldier's benefit on December 7, 1917, in Wolfe's hometown of Cleveland. Ertle, who was content to fight from long range, was overcome by the short range attack of Wolfe, who in this rare instance had a three-inch reach advantage over his 4' 11" opponent.

Leonard fought Gussie Lewis to a draw on March 18, 1918, in a semi-final six-round newspaper decision in Philadelphia, according to the Philadelphia Public Ledger.

== Three notable early career wins ==
Wolfe defeated British born featherweight Danny Frush at the Albaugh Theatre in Baltimore on March 27, 1918, in a fifteen-round points decision. Despite Frush's five inch advantage in height, and considerable reach advantage, Wolfe persevered and won the match.

On January 20, 1919, Wolfe defeated fellow Russian-born Cincinnati-based Jewish boxer Sammy Sandow in a ten-round newspaper decision that was the main event at a boxing club in Cleveland. In a well publicized bout, the boxing was close.

Early in his career on February 6, 1919, Wolfe defefated Artie Root at Grey's armory in Cleveland in a ten-round newspaper decision. The crowd of 10,000, was one of the largest ever jammed into the Armory. Wolfe managed to dodge Root's strong right, and took the lead in the last six rounds, building a slight margin. The win was a stepping stone for Wolfe's recognition as a bantam to watch.

== Victory over reigning bantamweight champion Pete Herman, March, 1919 ==
Wolfe defeated reigning bantamweight champion Pete Herman, on the evening of March 4, 1919, in a no decision non-title fight in Cleveland, Ohio, before a home audience. Hundreds were turned away at the door of the packed house at Grey's Armory. The Barre Daily Times gave Wolfe seven of the ten rounds, in a convincing victory. Wolfe was considered the aggressor throughout the bout, with Herman given only two rounds by a slight margin. The going was fast and furious, and a record breaking crowd attended the match.

=== Victory over world bantamweight claimant Jackie Sharkey, March, 1919 ===
Wolfe beat 5' 3" Italian bantam Jackie Sharkey in a ten-round newspaper decision on March 24, 1919, at the Grand Theatre in Cleveland. According to the most newspapers, the bout was close, and Sharkey put up a valiant effort. Sharkey was a well known boxer who fought many great bantams of the era, but did not frequently win against them, and once unsuccessfully competed for the Jr. Lightweight Title in July 1922 against Johnny Dundee. Sharkey claimed the World Bantamweight Title on August 15, 1919, in his bout with Pete Herman, though at the time there was some dispute over his claim, as boxing titles were not well regulated until years later.

Wolfe defeated Oklahoman Earl Puryear on December 29, 1919, in a ten-round newspaper decision in Cleveland. Wolfe had defeated Puryear earlier that year on April 8, in a no decision ten round bout ruled a draw by the Warren Evening Mirror. Puryear was a bantam with a good record who fought many great opponents including Johnny Buff, and champions Pete Herman and Kid Williams.

On April 20, 1920, Wolfe lost a newspaper decision to Charlie Beecher at the Arena in Syracuse, New York. Wolfe attempted to score at close range, as was his habit, but Beecher clinched frequently preventing him easy access. Few clean blows were scored by either boxer. Wolfe's few clean blows were left jabs to the face of Beecher. Beecher scored best to the body. The final four rounds presented most of the action. Some newspapers considered the bout a draw.

On January 23, 1920, Wolfe defeated top rated bantamweight Joe Burman in a ten-round newspaper decision in Buffalo, New York. Wolfe, against an equally matched opponent, was able to connect with more punches and put more power into them than his rival in the close bout. As in many other accounts of Wolfe, his defense was described as awkward, but adequate for the task. Nonetheless, Burman scored with his left jab and right hook to the face of Wolfe on several occasions. Wolfe had previous scored a draw and a win against Burman in newspaper decisions in their previous two bouts. In their December 19, 1919, bout in Akron, Ohio, Wolfe won in a ten-round newspaper decision. The fighting was close with both boxers wary of their opponent, and included frequent clinching. Midway through the bout, Burman attempted to fight at long range, dancing to gain an angle of advantage, but Wolfe clinched and continued infighting to neutralize the threat. With a two-inch disadvantage in height and reach, Wolfe was wise to prefer infighting rather than allowing Burman the advantage in long range attacks.

Wolfe defeated Eddie Pinchot in an eight-round newspaper decision in Rochester on January 24, 1921, despite a significant disadvantage in reach and height. Wolfe used his wealth of experience and four pounds extra weight to gain the popular decision, landing a stinging blow to the eye of Pinchot with a right swing in the fourth. Throughout the bout, and especially in the last two rounds, Wolfe fought aggressively and landed stronger blows than Pinchot.

=== Bouts with Pal Moore and Kid Williams, bantamweight champions ===
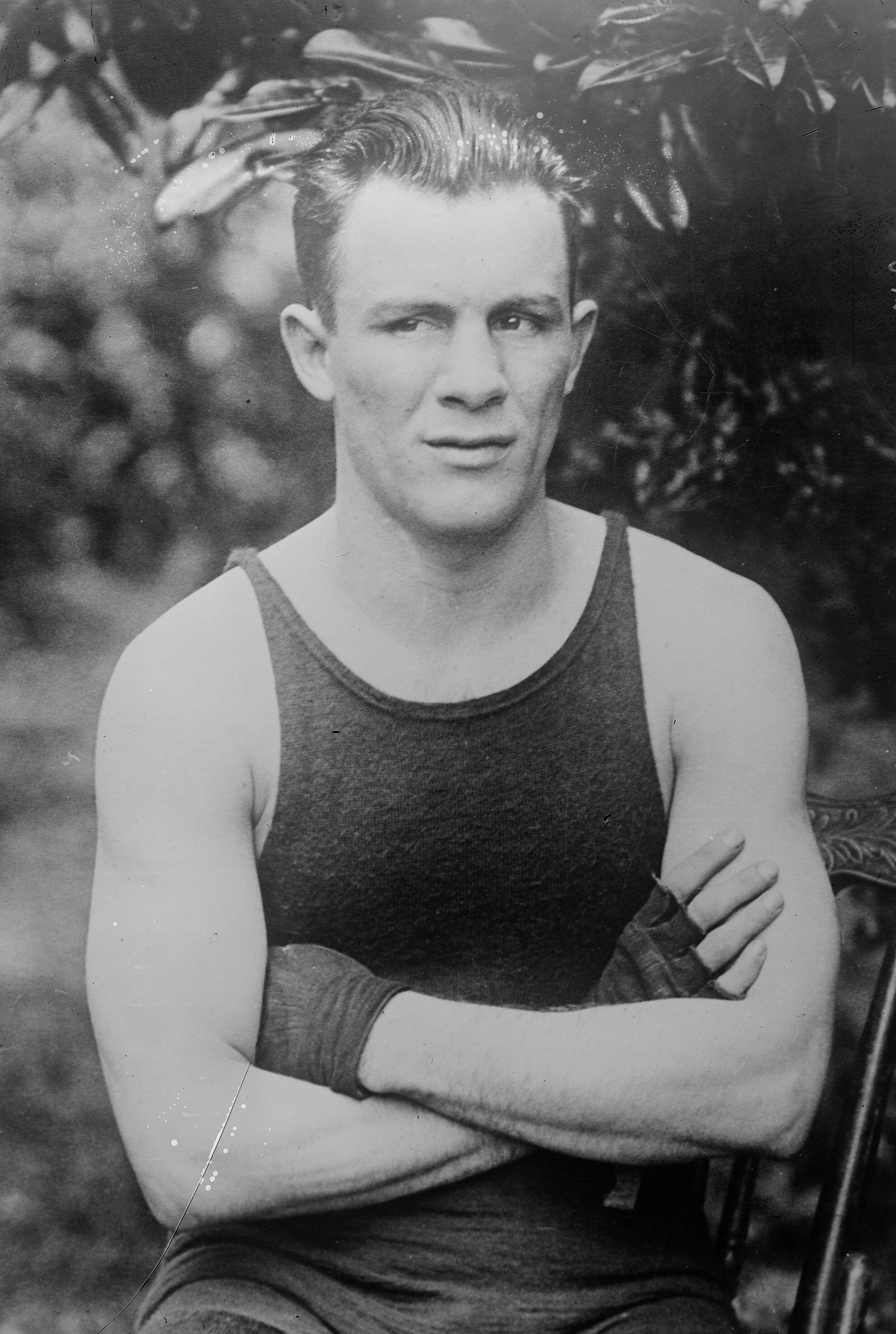
Bantam champ Memphis Pal Moore

On May 3, 1920, Wolfe lost to disputed 1918 World Bantamweight Champion Memphis Pal Moore in Memphis, Tennessee in an eight-round points decision. Moore, an exceptional opponent, fought bantamweight champion Joe Lynch ten times, but was unable to win a title match during the no decision era. He never knocked out Lynch, as would be required in most states to take the title during Lynch's reign as bantamweight champion and was never granted a title match judged on points, which he could have won more easily.

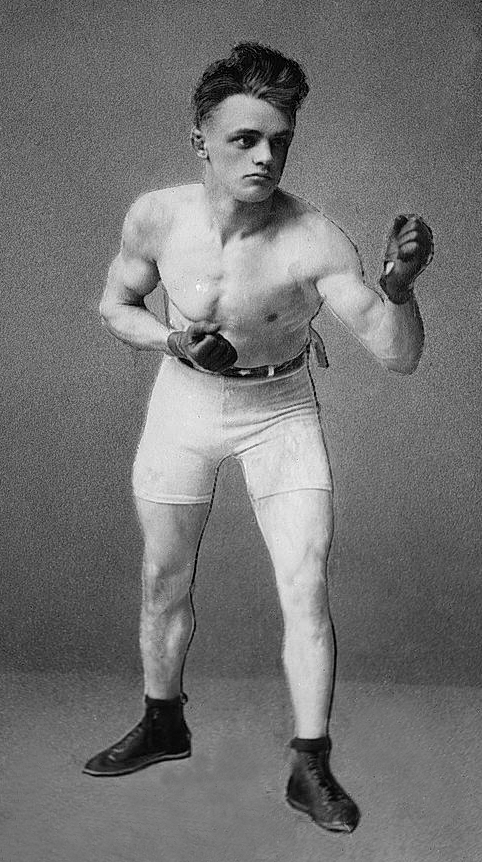
Bantam champ Kid Williams

It wasn't until April 21, 1921, that Wolfe really tasted defeat, as Danny Kramer, a southpaw from Philadelphia, put the ten count on him with a right to the jaw in the fifth of twelve rounds in Cleveland. Both boxers weighed 120, within the Junior Featherweight limit. Up until that point, Wolfe had defeated many of the top bantamweights and featherweights in the world, including several world champions in non-title bouts, and seemed nearly invincible.

On May 18, 1921, Wolfe defeated Kid Williams, former bantamweight champion from 1914 to 1917, at the armory in Cleveland, Ohio in a twelve-round match. The bout was considered tame, as both accomplished bantamweights were cautious and aware of the power of their opponents.

Wolfe won a newspaper decision over Frankie Kaiser on June 14, 1922, in Cincinnati. A few newspapers considered the bout a draw, however.

== Taking the junior featherweight world championship, September 1922 ==
Wolfe circa 1927

On September 21, 1922, Wolfe was matched with Joe Lynch, reigning World Bantamweight Champion, in New York's Madison Square Garden for the inaugural world title in the junior-featherweight division, winning in a fifteen-round bout. The weight limit for the new division was 122 pounds. The match could not be for the World Bantamweight Championship, as Lynch was four pounds over the weight class limit. It may have been Wolfe's most important victory as the fight was billed as a world championship, and Wolfe won his first and only title, though the New York State Athletic Commission did not recognize this weight class at the time. By the 1970s, the junior-featherweight class was revived and recognized worldwide.

The victory was a convincing win against one of Wolfe's most accomplished opponents, who according to New York City's The Evening World, was not adequately trained for the bout. The World did give credit to Wolfe's spirited attack, defense and wide points margin. A large percentage of Lynch's blows missed Wolfe, who put up a complete defense against nearly all the blows thrown by his opponent despite a considerable four inch disadvantage in reach. Lynch persisted in his attempts at a knockout but Wolfe repeatedly proved capable in his defense. Lynch threw far more blows than Wolfe, but they lacked the steam to bring down his opponent. In their five previous meetings, Wolfe had won three of the five contests, proving he had the skill to compete with the world champion. In their two most recent meetings in 1919, the fighting was close and several newspapers gave the decision to Lynch.

On December 26, 1922, Wolfe lost to Jewish Canadian boxer Benny Gould, also a Russian immigrant, for the world or Canadian version of the Junior Featherweight Title in a ten-round mixed decision. One judge voted for Wolfe but two dissented and voted for Gould. Wolfe once again lacked two inches in reach against the 5' 4", Gould, who was also six years younger and had been fighting professionally for only around three years compared to Wolfe's hard fought eleven.

On February 1, 1923, Wolfe defeated Eddie O'Dowd in a twelve-round points decision in O'Dowd's hometown of Columbus, Ohio. Dowd was a capable bantam who fought top talent including Frankie Gennarro, Kid Chocolate, and Panama Joe Brown, but was not likely to have ever cracked the top five world ratings among bantamweights.

On April 21, 1923, Wolfe defeated one of his more talented opponents, Frankie Jerome, in a twelve-round bout at the Commonwealth Sporting Club in New York. Jerome claimed to have broken his hand in their April bout. Wolfe would draw with Jerome four months later in Columbus, Ohio.

=== Losses to future lightweight champion Sammy Mandell, 1922-3 ===
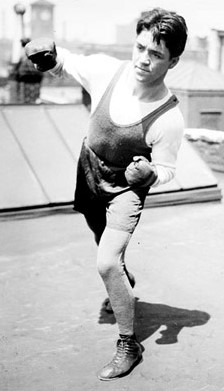
Lightweight Champ Sammy Mandell

On June 13, 1923, Wolfe lost to exceptional boxer Sammy Mandell in a twelve-round bout in Elmwood, Ohio. Wolfe used his right effectively in the bout but Mandell took the lead through most of the bout, and led comfortably by the end. Several newspapers gave Mandell every round. Wolfe had previously lost to Mandell in Kenosha, Wisconsin in October 1922, in a ten-round newspaper decision. Mandell would later hold the World Lightweight Championship from 1926 to 1930.

On July 30, 2923, Wolfe defeated bantamweight Pete Zivic in a brief, but very close six round points decision in Columbus, Ohio in which Zivic fought with talents.

=== Loss of Junior featherweight title, Carl Duane, August, 1923 ===
On August 29, 1923, Wolfe met Carl Duane in Long Island in defense of his Junior Featherweight title. Wolfe lost the 15-round decision. Duane was said to have led in every round, except the sixth when Wolfe attacked with a series of lefts and rights. Both men remained on their feet throughout the match, though Wolfe slipped in the fifth. The fifth through seventh were action packed though Wolfe was at a disadvantage from the eighth round on, with Duane taking the lead.

On January 14, 1924, Wolfe defeated talented and prolific Jewish bantamweight Young Montreal, born Morris Billingkoff, in Columbus, Ohio in a twelve-round match. A top bantamweight contender for ten years, Montreal would fight nine world champions a total of seventeen times.

In something of a comeback attempt on March 12, 1924, against Leroy "Kid" Roy, former and future holder of the Canadian Featherweight Title, Wolfe lost in a ten-round points decision in Montreal. In his prime, Wolfe may have won the victory, but his years of ring experience had diminished his speed and technique. At least in Canada, some reporters considered this bout for the world junior featherweight title, as Roy would take it two weeks later defeating Jewish boxer Benny Gould in Toronto.

Wolfe lost to fellow Cleveland bantamweight Carl Tremaine on July 28, 1924, in Cleveland, Ohio, in a first-round technical knockout. Wolfe had suffered an auto accident before the bout, and his face showed the results. After a brisk start to the bout, Tremaine landed a solid left on the face of Wolfe, and after a slight push, Wolfe sat down, and attempted to rise and was knocked down four more times, when the referee called the fight 2:58 into the first round. Wolfe prematurely announced his retirement to the Dayton Daily News two days later, but would soon return to boxing after a one-year break.

Wolfe attempted a comeback against Franklin Cheek in Milwaukee on December 18, 1931. He would lose in a six-round points decision and shortly after retire from boxing for the last time.

He was one of the most popular fighters in Cleveland history, and ended his career of 131 fights with 74 wins, 29 losses and 28 draws. In his entire career, only around eleven of his wins were knockouts or technical knockouts, as he was never considered a particularly heavy hitter. He died on April 22, 1975, at the age of 79.

== Professional boxing record ==
All information in this section is derived from BoxRec, unless otherwise stated.

=== Official Record ===
138 fights	40 wins	15 losses
By knockout	11	2
By decision	25	13
By disqualification	4	0
Draws	12	
No contests	3	
Newspaper decisions/draws	68	

All newspaper decisions are officially regarded as “no decision” bouts and are not counted in the win/loss/draw column.

No.	Result	Record	Opponent	Type	Round	Date	Age	Location	Notes
138	Loss	40–15–12 (71)	Franklin Cheek	PTS	6	Dec 18, 1924	29 years, 180 days	Auditorium, Milwaukee, Wisconsin, U.S.	
137	Draw	40–14–12 (71)	Bobby Renderle	NWS	10	Sep 9, 1924	29 years, 90 days	Armory, Toledo, Ohio, U.S.	
136	Loss	40–14–12 (70)	Carl Tremaine	TKO	1 (10)	Jul 28, 1924	29 years, 47 days	Olympic Arena, Brooklyn, Ohio, U.S.	
135	Loss	40–13–12 (70)	Leo "Kid" Roy	PTS	10	Mar 12, 1924	28 years, 275 days	St. Denis Theatre, Montreal, Quebec, Canada	
134	Win	40–12–12 (70)	Young Montreal	PTS	12	Jan 14, 1924	28 years, 217 days	Columbus, Ohio, U.S.	
133	Loss	39–12–12 (70)	Carl Duane	PTS	12	Aug 29, 1923	28 years, 79 days	Queensboro Stadium, New York City, New York, U.S.	Lost NYSAC junior-featherweight title
132	Draw	39–11–12 (70)	Frankie Jerome	PTS	12	Aug 13, 1923	28 years, 63 days	Columbus, Ohio, U.S.	
131	Win	39–11–11 (70)	Pete Zivic	PTS	6	Jul 30, 1923	28 years, 49 days	Columbus, Ohio, U.S.	
130	Win	38–11–11 (70)	Terry McHugh	NWS	12	Jul 3, 1923	28 years, 22 days	Oak Hill Auditorium, Youngstown, Ohio, U.S.	
129	Loss	38–11–11 (69)	Sammy Mandell	PTS	12	Jun 13, 1923	28 years, 2 days	Elmwood Arena, Elmwood Place, Ohio, U.S.	
128	Win	38–10–11 (69)	Frankie Jerome	PTS	12	Apr 21, 1923	27 years, 314 days	Commonwealth Sporting Club, New York City, New York, U.S.	
127	Loss	37–10–11 (69)	Terry Martin	NWS	12	Feb 5, 1923	27 years, 239 days	4th Regiment Armory, Jersey City, New Jersey, U.S.	
126	Win	37–10–11 (68)	Eddie O'Dowd	PTS	12	Feb 1, 1923	27 years, 235 days	Columbus, Ohio, U.S.	
125	Win	36–10–11 (68)	Eddie O'Dowd	PTS	12	Jan 30, 1923	27 years, 233 days	Columbus, Ohio, U.S.	
124	Loss	35–10–11 (68)	Benny Gould	MD	10	Dec 26, 1922	27 years, 198 days	Coliseum, Toronto, Ontario, Canada	
123	Win	35–9–11 (68)	Mickey Dillon	PTS	12	Dec 8, 1922	27 years, 180 days	Erie, Pennsylvania, U.S.	
122	Loss	34–9–11 (68)	Sammy Mandell	NWS	10	Oct 30, 1922	27 years, 141 days	Kenosha, Wisconsin, U.S.	
121	Draw	34–9–11 (67)	Midget Smith	NWS	12	Oct 6, 1922	27 years, 117 days	McKinney A.C., Canton, Ohio, U.S.	
120	Win	34–9–11 (66)	Joe Lynch	UD	15	Sep 21, 1922	27 years, 102 days	Madison Square Garden, New York City, New York, U.S.	Won inaugural NYSAC junior-featherweight title
119	Win	33–9–11 (66)	Frankie Jerome	PTS	12	Aug 14, 1922	27 years, 64 days	Velodrome, New York City, New York, U.S.	
118	Draw	32–9–11 (66)	Memphis Pal Moore	PTS	12	Aug 7, 1922	27 years, 57 days	Velodrome, New York City, New York, U.S.	
117	Loss	32–9–10 (66)	Frankie Jerome	PTS	12	Jul 10, 1922	27 years, 29 days	Velodrome, New York City, New York, U.S.	
116	Loss	32–8–10 (66)	Johnny Kaiser	NWS	10	Jul 3, 1922	27 years, 22 days	Polo Park, East Saint Louis, Illinois, U.S.	
115	Draw	32–8–10 (65)	Johnny Kaiser	NWS	10	Jun 14, 1922	27 years, 3 days	Redland Field, Cincinnati, Ohio, U.S.	
114	Draw	32–8–10 (64)	Bernie Hahn	NWS	10	Apr 21, 1922	26 years, 314 days	Chillicothe, Ohio, U.S.	
113	Win	32–8–10 (63)	Eddie Smith	KO	2 (10)	Mar 20, 1922	26 years, 282 days	Armory, Sandusky, Ohio, U.S.	
112	Win	31–8–10 (63)	Alvie Miller	NWS	10	Mar 1, 1922	26 years, 263 days	Lorain, Ohio, U.S.	
111	Win	31–8–10 (62)	Artie O'Leary	KO	2 (?)	Sep 17, 1921	26 years, 98 days	Dunn Field, Cleveland, Ohio, U.S.	
110	Win	30–8–10 (62)	Babe Asher	NWS	12	Sep 5, 1921	26 years, 86 days	Huron St. Open Air Arena, Toledo, Ohio, U.S.	
109	Draw	30–8–10 (61)	Carl Tremaine	PTS	12	Jul 11, 1921	26 years, 20 days	Dunn Field, Cleveland, Ohio, U.S.	
108	Loss	30–8–9 (61)	Terry Martin	PTS	12	May 30, 1921	25 years, 353 days	Woonsocket, Rhode Island, U.S.	
107	Win	30–7–9 (61)	Kid Williams	PTS	12	May 18, 1921	25 years, 341 days	Troop A. Armory, Cleveland, Ohio, U.S.	
106	Loss	29–7–9 (61)	Danny Kramer	KO	5 (12)	Apr 21, 1921	25 years, 314 days	Troop A. Armory, Cleveland, Ohio, U.S.	
105	Win	29–6–9 (61)	Paddy Owens	TKO	11 (12)	Mar 14, 1921	25 years, 276 days	Rochester, New York, U.S.	
104	Win	28–6–9 (61)	Frankie Daly	PTS	12	Mar 10, 1921	25 years, 272 days	Madison Square Garden, New York City, New York, U.S.	
103	Win	27–6–9 (61)	Eddie Pinchot	NWS	8	Jan 24, 1921	25 years, 227 days	Olympia A.C., Philadelphia, Pennsylvania, U.S.	
102	Win	27–6–9 (60)	Terry McHugh	NWS	6	Nov 25, 1920	25 years, 167 days	Olympia A.C., Philadelphia, Pennsylvania, U.S.	
101	Win	27–6–9 (59)	Harry Coulin	PTS	15	Sep 24, 1920	25 years, 105 days	Springfield, Ohio, U.S.	
100	Win	26–6–9 (59)	Kid Dayton	DQ	5 (12)	Aug 27, 1920	25 years, 77 days	Dayton, Ohio, U.S.	Dayton was DQ'd when one of his second's came into the ring claiming he had been hit low
99	Win	25–6–9 (59)	Joe Dailey	NWS	10	May 21, 1920	24 years, 345 days	Red Keystone Club, Erie, Pennsylvania, U.S.	
98	Win	25–6–9 (58)	K.O. Miller	TKO	2 (4)	May 20, 1920	24 years, 344 days	Barberton, Ohio, U.S.	
97	Loss	24–6–9 (58)	Memphis Pal Moore	PTS	8	May 3, 1920	24 years, 327 days	Southern A.C., Memphis, Tennessee, U.S.	
96	Win	24–5–9 (58)	Harry Bramer	PTS	8	Apr 26, 1920	24 years, 320 days	Southern A.C., Memphis, Tennessee, U.S.	
95	Loss	23–5–9 (58)	Charlie Beecher	NWS	10	Apr 20, 1920	24 years, 314 days	Arena, Syracuse, New York, U.S.	
94	Draw	23–5–9 (57)	Mike Dundee	NWS	10	Mar 25, 1920	24 years, 288 days	Rock Island, Illinois, U.S.	
93	Win	23–5–9 (56)	Harry Bramer	PTS	8	Mar 15, 1920	24 years, 278 days	Southern A.C., Memphis, Tennessee, U.S.	
92	Win	22–5–9 (56)	Joe Lynch	NWS	10	Feb 18, 1920	24 years, 252 days	Cleveland, Ohio, U.S.	
91	Win	22–5–9 (55)	Joe Burman	NWS	10	Jan 23, 1920	24 years, 226 days	Broadway Auditorium, Buffalo, New York, U.S.	
90	Draw	22–5–9 (54)	Joe Burman	PTS	10	Jan 19, 1920	24 years, 222 days	Peoria, Illinois, U.S.	
89	Win	22–5–8 (54)	Earl Puryear	NWS	10	Dec 29, 1919	24 years, 201 days	Gray's Armory, Cleveland, Ohio, U.S.	
88	Win	22–5–8 (53)	Joe Burman	NWS	12	Dec 12, 1919	24 years, 184 days	Akron, Ohio, U.S.	
87	Loss	22–5–8 (52)	Joe Lynch	NWS	6	Nov 24, 1919	24 years, 166 days	Olympia A.C., Philadelphia, Pennsylvania, U.S.	
86	Loss	22–5–8 (51)	Joe Lynch	NWS	10	Nov 5, 1919	24 years, 147 days	Arcadia Arena, Detroit, Michigan, U.S.	
85	ND	22–5–8 (50)	Charlie Parker	ND	12	Sep 23, 1919	24 years, 104 days	Dayton, Ohio, U.S.	
84	Win	22–5–8 (49)	Jackie Sanders	NWS	15	Jul 21, 1919	24 years, 40 days	Gymnastic Club, Dayton, Ohio, U.S.	
83	Draw	22–5–8 (48)	Patsy Johnson	PTS	15	Jun 27, 1919	24 years, 16 days	Oriole Park, Baltimore, Maryland, U.S.	
82	Win	22–5–7 (48)	Joe Burman	NWS	10	May 1, 1919	23 years, 324 days	Gray's Armory, Cleveland, Ohio, U.S.	
81	Draw	22–5–7 (47)	Earl Puryear	NWS	10	Apr 8, 1919	23 years, 301 days	Peoria, Illinois, U.S.	
80	Win	22–5–7 (46)	Billy Hill	TKO	4 (8)	Apr 1, 1919	23 years, 294 days	Youngstown, Ohio, U.S.	
79	Win	21–5–7 (46)	Jackie Sharkey	NWS	10	Mar 24, 1919	23 years, 286 days	Grand Theater, Cleveland, Ohio, U.S.	
78	Win	21–5–7 (45)	Pete Herman	NWS	10	Mar 4, 1919	23 years, 266 days	Gray's Armory, Cleveland, Ohio, U.S.	
77	Win	21–5–7 (44)	Eddie Lavery	NWS	10	Feb 25, 1919	23 years, 259 days	146th Infantry Armory, Akron, Ohio, U.S.	
76	Win	21–5–7 (43)	Mike La Duca	NWS	8	Feb 17, 1919	23 years, 251 days	Detroit, Michigan, U.S.	
75	Win	21–5–7 (42)	Artie Root	NWS	10	Feb 6, 1919	23 years, 240 days	Gray's Armory, Cleveland, Ohio, U.S.	
74	Win	21–5–7 (41)	Sammy Sandow	NWS	10	Jan 20, 1919	23 years, 223 days	Marotta A.C., Cleveland, Ohio, U.S.	
73	Win	21–5–7 (40)	Dick Loadman	NWS	10	Jan 6, 1919	23 years, 209 days	Detroit, Michigan, U.S.	
72	Draw	21–5–7 (39)	Sammy Sandow	PTS	15	Jan 1, 1919	23 years, 204 days	Gymnastic Club, Dayton, Ohio, U.S.	
71	Win	21–5–6 (39)	Dick Loadman	NWS	10	Oct 7, 1918	23 years, 118 days	Cleveland, Ohio, U.S.	
70	NC	21–5–6 (38)	Mickey McCafferty	NC	?	Sep 21, 1918	23 years, 102 days	Fairgounds, Elyria, Ohio, U.S.	Number of rounds unknown
69	Win	21–5–6 (37)	Eddie Dundee	NWS	3	Jun 26, 1918	23 years, 15 days	Service Club, Philadelphia, Pennsylvania, U.S.	
68	Loss	21–5–6 (36)	Joe Lynch	NWS	10	Apr 16, 1918	22 years, 309 days	Cleveland Theatre (Moose Club), Cleveland, Ohio, U.S.	
67	Win	21–5–6 (35)	Danny Frush	PTS	15	Mar 27, 1918	22 years, 289 days	Albaugh Theater, Baltimore, Maryland, U.S.	
66	Draw	20–5–6 (35)	Gussie Lewis	NWS	10	Mar 18, 1918	22 years, 280 days	Olympia A.C., Philadelphia, Pennsylvania, U.S.	
65	Win	20–5–6 (34)	Willie Devore	NWS	10	Mar 7, 1918	22 years, 269 days	Cleveland, Ohio, U.S.	
64	Win	20–5–6 (33)	Johnny Ertle	NWS	10	Jan 25, 1918	22 years, 228 days	Cleveland, Ohio, U.S.	World bantamweight title claim at stake; (via KO only)
63	Win	20–5–6 (32)	Benny Coster	NWS	10	Dec 28, 1917	22 years, 200 days	Cleveland, Ohio, U.S.	
62	Win	20–5–6 (31)	Johnny Ertle	NWS	10	Dec 7, 1917	22 years, 179 days	Cleveland, Ohio, U.S.	World bantamweight title claim at stake; (via KO only)
61	Win	20–5–6 (30)	Sammy Sandow	NWS	15	Oct 22, 1917	22 years, 133 days	Heuck's Opera House, Cincinnati, Ohio, U.S.	
60	Win	20–5–6 (29)	Mickey Byrne	DQ	3 (?)	Oct 11, 1917	22 years, 122 days	Cleveland, Ohio, U.S.	Byrne was disqualified for butting
59	Win	19–5–6 (29)	Willie Devore	NWS	8	Sep 28, 1917	22 years, 109 days	Akron, Ohio, U.S.	
58	Win	19–5–6 (28)	Willie Devore	NWS	10	Sep 3, 1917	22 years, 84 days	League Park, Canton, Ohio, U.S.	
57	Loss	19–5–6 (27)	Memphis Pal Moore	PTS	8	Jun 18, 1917	22 years, 7 days	Memphis, Tennessee, U.S.	
56	Draw	19–4–6 (27)	Andy Chaney	PTS	15	May 21, 1917	21 years, 344 days	Monumental Theater, Baltimore, Maryland, U.S.	
55	Win	19–4–5 (27)	Eddie Wimler	NWS	6	Mar 31, 1917	21 years, 293 days	Southside Market House, Pittsburgh, Pennsylvania, U.S.	
54	Win	19–4–5 (26)	Terry Martin	PTS	15	Mar 12, 1917	21 years, 274 days	Monumental Theater, Baltimore, Maryland, U.S.	
53	Draw	18–4–5 (26)	Dick Loadman	NWS	10	Mar 2, 1917	21 years, 264 days	Cleveland, Ohio, U.S.	
52	Win	18–4–5 (25)	Memphis Pal Moore	TKO	4 (10)	Feb 20, 1917	21 years, 254 days	Cleveland, Ohio, U.S.	Moore broke his arm
51	Win	17–4–5 (25)	Dick Loadman	PTS	15	Feb 5, 1917	21 years, 239 days	Momumental Theater, Baltimore, Maryland, U.S.	
50	Win	16–4–5 (25)	Al Shubert	PTS	15	Jan 22, 1917	21 years, 225 days	Momumental Theater, Baltimore, Maryland, U.S.	
49	Win	15–4–5 (25)	Chick Hayes	NWS	10	Jan 4, 1917	21 years, 207 days	Marotta A.C., Cleveland, Ohio, U.S.	
48	Win	15–4–5 (24)	Battling Lahn	NWS	10	Nov 10, 1916	21 years, 152 days	Cleveland, Ohio, U.S.	
47	Win	15–4–5 (23)	Battling Lahn	NWS	10	Oct 7, 1916	21 years, 118 days	Cleveland, Ohio, U.S.	
46	Draw	15–4–5 (22)	Luke Ginley	PTS	10	Sep 4, 1916	21 years, 85 days	Cedar Point Arena, Sandusky, Ohio, U.S.	
45	Win	15–4–4 (22)	Frankie Brown	NWS	10	Aug 28, 1916	21 years, 78 days	Airdome A.C., Rochester, New York, U.S.	
44	Loss	15–4–4 (21)	Young Joey Mendo	NWS	10	Aug 7, 1916	21 years, 57 days	Airdome A.C., Rochester, New York, U.S.	
43	Loss	15–4–4 (20)	Young Joey Mendo	NWS	6	Jul 31, 1916	21 years, 50 days	Airdome A.C., Rochester, New York, U.S.	
42	Win	15–4–4 (19)	Mickey Byrne	NWS	10	May 25, 1916	20 years, 349 days	Gray's Armory, Cleveland, Ohio, U.S.	
41	Win	15–4–4 (18)	Luke Ginley	PTS	8	Apr 25, 1916	20 years, 319 days	Cleveland, Ohio, U.S.	
40	Win	14–4–4 (18)	Johnny Eggers	DQ	5 (?)	Dec 11, 1915	20 years, 183 days	Fairmont A.C., New York City, New York, U.S.	
39	Loss	13–4–4 (18)	Al Shubert	PTS	12	Oct 28, 1915	20 years, 139 days	Unity Cycle Club, Lawrence, Massachusetts, U.S.	
38	Draw	13–3–4 (18)	Battling Lahn	PTS	12	Oct 12, 1915	20 years, 123 days	Unity Cycle Club, Lawrence, Massachusetts, U.S.	
37	Loss	13–3–3 (18)	Al Shubert	PTS	12	Jun 23, 1915	20 years, 12 days	Thornton, Rhode Island, U.S.	
36	ND	13–2–3 (18)	Jim Mace	ND	10	May 15, 1915	19 years, 338 days	Broadway S.C., New York City, New York, U.S.	
35	Loss	13–2–3 (17)	Eddie O'Keefe	NWS	10	Apr 21, 1915	19 years, 314 days	Atlantic Garden A.C., New York City, New York, U.S.	
34	Loss	13–2–3 (16)	Al Schubert	PTS	12	Mar 4, 1915	19 years, 266 days	Lawrence, Massachusetts, U.S.	
33	Loss	13–1–3 (16)	Al Schubert	PTS	12	Feb 18, 1915	19 years, 252 days	Unity Cycle Club, Lawrence, Massachusetts, U.S.	
32	Win	13–0–3 (16)	Joe Daley	NWS	6	Feb 13, 1915	19 years, 247 days	Broadway S.C., New York City, New York, U.S.	
31	Loss	13–0–3 (15)	Willie Doyle	NWS	10	Jan 18, 1915	19 years, 221 days	Olympia Boxing Club, New York City, New York, U.S.	
30	Loss	13–0–3 (14)	Kid Herman	NWS	10	Dec 11, 1914	19 years, 183 days	Federal A.C., New York City, New York, U.S.	
29	Win	13–0–3 (13)	Jake Schiffer	NWS	10	Feb 2, 1914	18 years, 236 days	Grand Opera House, Youngstown, Ohio, U.S.	
28	Draw	13–0–3 (12)	Alvie Miller	NWS	10	Nov 17, 1913	18 years, 159 days	Canton Auditorium, Canton, Ohio, U.S.	
27	Draw	13–0–3 (11)	Alvie Miller	NWS	8	Sep 1, 1913	18 years, 82 days	League Park, Canton, Ohio, U.S.	
26	Draw	13–0–3 (10)	Alvie Miller	PTS	12	Apr 28, 1913	17 years, 321 days	Akron, Ohio, U.S.	
25	Win	13–0–2 (10)	Johnny Eggers	NWS	10	Feb 8, 1913	17 years, 242 days	Queensboro A.C., New York City, New York, U.S.	
24	Win	13–0–2 (9)	Danny Dunn	PTS	12	Dec 10, 1912	17 years, 182 days	Marotta A.C., Cleveland, Ohio, U.S.	
23	Win	12–0–2 (9)	Kid Murphy	PTS	12	Oct 17, 1912	17 years, 128 days	Cleveland A.C., Cleveland, Ohio, U.S.	
22	Win	11–0–2 (9)	Kid Murphy	PTS	10	Sep 27, 1912	17 years, 108 days	Cleveland A.C., Cleveland, Ohio, U.S.	
21	Draw	10–0–2 (9)	Porter Root	PTS	10	May 31, 1912	16 years, 355 days	Victor A.C., Cleveland, Ohio, U.S.	
20	Win	10–0–1 (9)	Kid Tepper	TKO	8 (8)	May 20, 1912	16 years, 344 days	Tuxedo Club, Cleveland, Ohio, U.S.	
19	Win	9–0–1 (9)	Julius Hess	TKO	3 (?)	Apr 18, 1912	16 years, 312 days	Victor A.C., Cleveland, Ohio, U.S.	
18	Win	8–0–1 (9)	Rip Starke	TKO	7 (10)	Mar 11, 1912	16 years, 274 days	Victor A.C., Cleveland, Ohio, U.S.	
17	Win	7–0–1 (9)	George St. Pierre	KO	6 (?)	Feb 27, 1912	16 years, 261 days	Elk's Club, Cleveland, Ohio, U.S.	
16	Win	6–0–1 (9)	Johnny Eggers	NWS	10	Feb 22, 1912	16 years, 256 days	National S.C., New York City, New York, U.S.	
15	Draw	6–0–1 (8)	Porter Root	PTS	10	Feb 12, 1912	16 years, 246 days	Moose Club, Cleveland, Ohio, U.S.	
14	Draw	6–0 (8)	Rip Starke	NWS	6	Jan 30, 1912	16 years, 233 days	Akron, Ohio, U.S.	
13	Win	6–0 (7)	Frankie Mason	PTS	10	Jan 26, 1912	16 years, 229 days	Social Seven Club, Sandusky, Ohio, U.S.	
12	Win	5–0 (7)	Julius Hess	PTS	10	Jan 9, 1912	16 years, 212 days	Tuxedo Club, Cleveland, Ohio, U.S.	
11	Win	4–0 (7)	Jimmy Lynn	NWS	10	Dec 23, 1911	16 years, 195 days	Gray's Armory, Cleveland, Ohio, U.S.	
10	Win	4–0 (6)	Tom Linn	PTS	6	Dec 18, 1911	16 years, 190 days	Corney's Hall, Cleveland, Ohio, U.S.	
9	Draw	3–0 (6)	Cal Delaney	NWS	10	Dec 12, 1911	16 years, 184 days	Broadway A.C., Cleveland, Ohio, U.S.	
8	Win	3–0 (5)	Jimmy Hector	PTS	10	Nov 16, 1911	16 years, 158 days	Moose Club, Cleveland, Ohio, U.S.	
7	Win	2–0 (5)	Kid Coffey	NWS	10	Oct 17, 1911	16 years, 128 days	Cleveland, Ohio, U.S.	
6	Loss	2–0 (4)	Cal Delaney	NWS	10	Oct 10, 1911	16 years, 121 days	Cleveland, Ohio, U.S.	
5	Win	2–0 (3)	Kid Schwertle	TKO	3 (?)	Sep 12, 1911	16 years, 93 days	Cleveland, Ohio, U.S.	
4	Draw	1–0 (3)	Julius Hess	NWS	10	Jun 6, 1911	15 years, 360 days	Columbia Theater, Cleveland, Ohio, U.S.	
3	Win	1–0 (2)	Johnny Griffiths	DQ	5 (10)	May 26, 1911	15 years, 349 days	Star Theatre, New Philadelphia, Ohio, U.S.	Griffiths was disqualified for hitting low
2	Win	0–0 (2)	Frankie Mason	NWS	10	May 1, 1911	15 years, 324 days	Cleveland, Ohio, U.S.	Exact date unknown
1	Draw	0–0 (1)	Cal Delaney	NWS	6	Apr 18, 1911	15 years, 311 days	Cleveland, Ohio, U.S.	

=== Unofficial record ===
138 fights	81 wins	28 losses
By knockout	11	2
By decision	66	26
By disqualification	4	0
Draws	26	
No contests	3	

Record with the inclusion of newspaper decisions in the win/loss/draw column.

No.	Result	Record	Opponent	Type	Round	Date	Age	Location	Notes
138	Loss	81–28–26 (3)	Franklin Cheek	PTS	6	Dec 18, 1924	29 years, 180 days	Auditorium, Milwaukee, Wisconsin, U.S.	
137	Draw	81–27–26 (3)	Bobby Renderle	NWS	10	Sep 9, 1924	29 years, 90 days	Armory, Toledo, Ohio, U.S.	
136	Loss	81–27–25 (3)	Carl Tremaine	TKO	1 (10)	Jul 28, 1924	29 years, 47 days	Olympic Arena, Brooklyn, Ohio, U.S.	
135	Loss	81–26–25 (3)	Leo "Kid" Roy	PTS	10	Mar 12, 1924	28 years, 275 days	St. Denis Theatre, Montreal, Quebec, Canada	
134	Win	81–25–25 (3)	Young Montreal	PTS	12	Jan 14, 1924	28 years, 217 days	Columbus, Ohio, U.S.	
133	Loss	80–25–25 (3)	Carl Duane	PTS	12	Aug 29, 1923	28 years, 79 days	Queensboro Stadium, New York City, New York, U.S.	Lost NYSAC junior-featherweight title
132	Draw	80–24–25 (3)	Frankie Jerome	PTS	12	Aug 13, 1923	28 years, 63 days	Columbus, Ohio, U.S.	
131	Win	80–24–24 (3)	Pete Zivic	PTS	6	Jul 30, 1923	28 years, 49 days	Columbus, Ohio, U.S.	
130	Win	79–24–24 (3)	Terry McHugh	NWS	12	Jul 3, 1923	28 years, 22 days	Oak Hill Auditorium, Youngstown, Ohio, U.S.	
129	Loss	78–24–24 (3)	Sammy Mandell	PTS	12	Jun 13, 1923	28 years, 2 days	Elmwood Arena, Elmwood Place, Ohio, U.S.	
128	Win	78–23–24 (3)	Frankie Jerome	PTS	12	Apr 21, 1923	27 years, 314 days	Commonwealth Sporting Club, New York City, New York, U.S.	
127	Loss	77–23–24 (3)	Terry Martin	NWS	12	Feb 5, 1923	27 years, 239 days	4th Regiment Armory, Jersey City, New Jersey, U.S.	
126	Win	77–22–24 (3)	Eddie O'Dowd	PTS	12	Feb 1, 1923	27 years, 235 days	Columbus, Ohio, U.S.	
125	Win	76–22–24 (3)	Eddie O'Dowd	PTS	12	Jan 30, 1923	27 years, 233 days	Columbus, Ohio, U.S.	
124	Loss	75–22–24 (3)	Benny Gould	MD	10	Dec 26, 1922	27 years, 198 days	Coliseum, Toronto, Ontario, Canada	
123	Win	75–21–24 (3)	Mickey Dillon	PTS	12	Dec 8, 1922	27 years, 180 days	Erie, Pennsylvania, U.S.	
122	Loss	74–21–24 (3)	Sammy Mandell	NWS	10	Oct 30, 1922	27 years, 141 days	Kenosha, Wisconsin, U.S.	
121	Draw	74–20–24 (3)	Midget Smith	NWS	12	Oct 6, 1922	27 years, 117 days	McKinney A.C., Canton, Ohio, U.S.	
120	Win	74–20–23 (3)	Joe Lynch	UD	15	Sep 21, 1922	27 years, 102 days	Madison Square Garden, New York City, New York, U.S.	Won inaugural NYSAC junior-featherweight title
119	Win	73–20–23 (3)	Frankie Jerome	PTS	12	Aug 14, 1922	27 years, 64 days	Velodrome, New York City, New York, U.S.	
118	Draw	72–20–23 (3)	Memphis Pal Moore	PTS	12	Aug 7, 1922	27 years, 57 days	Velodrome, New York City, New York, U.S.	
117	Loss	72–20–22 (3)	Frankie Jerome	PTS	12	Jul 10, 1922	27 years, 29 days	Velodrome, New York City, New York, U.S.	
116	Loss	72–19–22 (3)	Johnny Kaiser	NWS	10	Jul 3, 1922	27 years, 22 days	Polo Park, East Saint Louis, Illinois, U.S.	
115	Draw	72–18–22 (3)	Johnny Kaiser	NWS	10	Jun 14, 1922	27 years, 3 days	Redland Field, Cincinnati, Ohio, U.S.	
114	Draw	72–18–21 (3)	Bernie Hahn	NWS	10	Apr 21, 1922	26 years, 314 days	Chillicothe, Ohio, U.S.	
113	Win	72–18–20 (3)	Eddie Smith	KO	2 (10)	Mar 20, 1922	26 years, 282 days	Armory, Sandusky, Ohio, U.S.	
112	Win	71–18–20 (3)	Alvie Miller	NWS	10	Mar 1, 1922	26 years, 263 days	Lorain, Ohio, U.S.	
111	Win	70–18–20 (3)	Artie O'Leary	KO	2 (?)	Sep 17, 1921	26 years, 98 days	Dunn Field, Cleveland, Ohio, U.S.	
110	Win	69–18–20 (3)	Babe Asher	NWS	12	Sep 5, 1921	26 years, 86 days	Huron St. Open Air Arena, Toledo, Ohio, U.S.	
109	Draw	68–18–20 (3)	Carl Tremaine	PTS	12	Jul 11, 1921	26 years, 20 days	Dunn Field, Cleveland, Ohio, U.S.	
108	Loss	68–18–19 (3)	Terry Martin	PTS	12	May 30, 1921	25 years, 353 days	Woonsocket, Rhode Island, U.S.	
107	Win	68–17–19 (3)	Kid Williams	PTS	12	May 18, 1921	25 years, 341 days	Troop A. Armory, Cleveland, Ohio, U.S.	
106	Loss	67–17–19 (3)	Danny Kramer	KO	5 (12)	Apr 21, 1921	25 years, 314 days	Troop A. Armory, Cleveland, Ohio, U.S.	
105	Win	67–16–19 (3)	Paddy Owens	TKO	11 (12)	Mar 14, 1921	25 years, 276 days	Rochester, New York, U.S.	
104	Win	66–16–19 (3)	Frankie Daly	PTS	12	Mar 10, 1921	25 years, 272 days	Madison Square Garden, New York City, New York, U.S.	
103	Win	65–16–19 (3)	Eddie Pinchot	NWS	8	Jan 24, 1921	25 years, 227 days	Olympia A.C., Philadelphia, Pennsylvania, U.S.	
102	Win	64–16–19 (3)	Terry McHugh	NWS	6	Nov 25, 1920	25 years, 167 days	Olympia A.C., Philadelphia, Pennsylvania, U.S.	
101	Win	63–16–19 (3)	Harry Coulin	PTS	15	Sep 24, 1920	25 years, 105 days	Springfield, Ohio, U.S.	
100	Win	62–16–19 (3)	Kid Dayton	DQ	5 (12)	Aug 27, 1920	25 years, 77 days	Dayton, Ohio, U.S.	Dayton was DQ'd when one of his second's came into the ring claiming he had been hit low
99	Win	61–16–19 (3)	Joe Dailey	NWS	10	May 21, 1920	24 years, 345 days	Red Keystone Club, Erie, Pennsylvania, U.S.	
98	Win	60–16–19 (3)	K.O. Miller	TKO	2 (4)	May 20, 1920	24 years, 344 days	Barberton, Ohio, U.S.	
97	Loss	59–16–19 (3)	Memphis Pal Moore	PTS	8	May 3, 1920	24 years, 327 days	Southern A.C., Memphis, Tennessee, U.S.	
96	Win	59–15–19 (3)	Harry Bramer	PTS	8	Apr 26, 1920	24 years, 320 days	Southern A.C., Memphis, Tennessee, U.S.	
95	Loss	58–15–19 (3)	Charlie Beecher	NWS	10	Apr 20, 1920	24 years, 314 days	Arena, Syracuse, New York, U.S.	
94	Draw	58–14–19 (3)	Mike Dundee	NWS	10	Mar 25, 1920	24 years, 288 days	Rock Island, Illinois, U.S.	
93	Win	58–14–18 (3)	Harry Bramer	PTS	8	Mar 15, 1920	24 years, 278 days	Southern A.C., Memphis, Tennessee, U.S.	
92	Win	57–14–18 (3)	Joe Lynch	NWS	10	Feb 18, 1920	24 years, 252 days	Cleveland, Ohio, U.S.	
91	Win	56–14–18 (3)	Joe Burman	NWS	10	Jan 23, 1920	24 years, 226 days	Broadway Auditorium, Buffalo, New York, U.S.	
90	Draw	55–14–18 (3)	Joe Burman	PTS	10	Jan 19, 1920	24 years, 222 days	Peoria, Illinois, U.S.	
89	Win	55–14–17 (3)	Earl Puryear	NWS	10	Dec 29, 1919	24 years, 201 days	Gray's Armory, Cleveland, Ohio, U.S.	
88	Win	54–14–17 (3)	Joe Burman	NWS	12	Dec 12, 1919	24 years, 184 days	Akron, Ohio, U.S.	
87	Loss	53–14–17 (3)	Joe Lynch	NWS	6	Nov 24, 1919	24 years, 166 days	Olympia A.C., Philadelphia, Pennsylvania, U.S.	
86	Loss	53–13–17 (3)	Joe Lynch	NWS	10	Nov 5, 1919	24 years, 147 days	Arcadia Arena, Detroit, Michigan, U.S.	
85	ND	53–12–17 (3)	Charlie Parker	ND	12	Sep 23, 1919	24 years, 104 days	Dayton, Ohio, U.S.	
84	Win	53–12–17 (2)	Jackie Sanders	NWS	15	Jul 21, 1919	24 years, 40 days	Gymnastic Club, Dayton, Ohio, U.S.	
83	Draw	52–12–17 (2)	Patsy Johnson	PTS	15	Jun 27, 1919	24 years, 16 days	Oriole Park, Baltimore, Maryland, U.S.	
82	Win	52–12–16 (2)	Joe Burman	NWS	10	May 1, 1919	23 years, 324 days	Gray's Armory, Cleveland, Ohio, U.S.	
81	Draw	51–12–16 (2)	Earl Puryear	NWS	10	Apr 8, 1919	23 years, 301 days	Peoria, Illinois, U.S.	
80	Win	51–12–15 (2)	Billy Hill	TKO	4 (8)	Apr 1, 1919	23 years, 294 days	Youngstown, Ohio, U.S.	
79	Win	50–12–15 (2)	Jackie Sharkey	NWS	10	Mar 24, 1919	23 years, 286 days	Grand Theater, Cleveland, Ohio, U.S.	
78	Win	49–12–15 (2)	Pete Herman	NWS	10	Mar 4, 1919	23 years, 266 days	Gray's Armory, Cleveland, Ohio, U.S.	
77	Win	48–12–15 (2)	Eddie Lavery	NWS	10	Feb 25, 1919	23 years, 259 days	146th Infantry Armory, Akron, Ohio, U.S.	
76	Win	47–12–15 (2)	Mike La Duca	NWS	8	Feb 17, 1919	23 years, 251 days	Detroit, Michigan, U.S.	
75	Win	46–12–15 (2)	Artie Root	NWS	10	Feb 6, 1919	23 years, 240 days	Gray's Armory, Cleveland, Ohio, U.S.	
74	Win	45–12–15 (2)	Sammy Sandow	NWS	10	Jan 20, 1919	23 years, 223 days	Marotta A.C., Cleveland, Ohio, U.S.	
73	Win	44–12–15 (2)	Dick Loadman	NWS	10	Jan 6, 1919	23 years, 209 days	Detroit, Michigan, U.S.	
72	Draw	43–12–15 (2)	Sammy Sandow	PTS	15	Jan 1, 1919	23 years, 204 days	Gymnastic Club, Dayton, Ohio, U.S.	
71	Win	43–12–14 (2)	Dick Loadman	NWS	10	Oct 7, 1918	23 years, 118 days	Cleveland, Ohio, U.S.	
70	NC	42–12–14 (2)	Mickey McCafferty	NC	?	Sep 21, 1918	23 years, 102 days	Fairgounds, Elyria, Ohio, U.S.	Number of rounds unknown
69	Win	42–12–14 (1)	Eddie Dundee	NWS	3	Jun 26, 1918	23 years, 15 days	Service Club, Philadelphia, Pennsylvania, U.S.	
68	Loss	41–12–14 (1)	Joe Lynch	NWS	10	Apr 16, 1918	22 years, 309 days	Cleveland Theatre (Moose Club), Cleveland, Ohio, U.S.	
67	Win	41–11–14 (1)	Danny Frush	PTS	15	Mar 27, 1918	22 years, 289 days	Albaugh Theater, Baltimore, Maryland, U.S.	
66	Draw	40–11–14 (1)	Gussie Lewis	NWS	10	Mar 18, 1918	22 years, 280 days	Olympia A.C., Philadelphia, Pennsylvania, U.S.	
65	Win	40–11–13 (1)	Willie Devore	NWS	10	Mar 7, 1918	22 years, 269 days	Cleveland, Ohio, U.S.	
64	Win	39–11–13 (1)	Johnny Ertle	NWS	10	Jan 25, 1918	22 years, 228 days	Cleveland, Ohio, U.S.	World bantamweight title claim at stake; (via KO only)
63	Win	38–11–13 (1)	Benny Coster	NWS	10	Dec 28, 1917	22 years, 200 days	Cleveland, Ohio, U.S.	
62	Win	37–11–13 (1)	Johnny Ertle	NWS	10	Dec 7, 1917	22 years, 179 days	Cleveland, Ohio, U.S.	World bantamweight title claim at stake; (via KO only)
61	Win	36–11–13 (1)	Sammy Sandow	NWS	15	Oct 22, 1917	22 years, 133 days	Heuck's Opera House, Cincinnati, Ohio, U.S.	
60	Win	35–11–13 (1)	Mickey Byrne	DQ	3 (?)	Oct 11, 1917	22 years, 122 days	Cleveland, Ohio, U.S.	Byrne was disqualified for butting
59	Win	34–11–13 (1)	Willie Devore	NWS	8	Sep 28, 1917	22 years, 109 days	Akron, Ohio, U.S.	
58	Win	33–11–13 (1)	Willie Devore	NWS	10	Sep 3, 1917	22 years, 84 days	League Park, Canton, Ohio, U.S.	
57	Loss	32–11–13 (1)	Memphis Pal Moore	PTS	8	Jun 18, 1917	22 years, 7 days	Memphis, Tennessee, U.S.	
56	Draw	32–10–13 (1)	Andy Chaney	PTS	15	May 21, 1917	21 years, 344 days	Monumental Theater, Baltimore, Maryland, U.S.	
55	Win	32–10–12 (1)	Eddie Wimler	NWS	6	Mar 31, 1917	21 years, 293 days	Southside Market House, Pittsburgh, Pennsylvania, U.S.	
54	Win	31–10–12 (1)	Terry Martin	PTS	15	Mar 12, 1917	21 years, 274 days	Monumental Theater, Baltimore, Maryland, U.S.	
53	Draw	30–10–12 (1)	Dick Loadman	NWS	10	Mar 2, 1917	21 years, 264 days	Cleveland, Ohio, U.S.	
52	Win	30–10–11 (1)	Memphis Pal Moore	TKO	4 (10)	Feb 20, 1917	21 years, 254 days	Cleveland, Ohio, U.S.	Moore broke his arm
51	Win	29–10–11 (1)	Dick Loadman	PTS	15	Feb 5, 1917	21 years, 239 days	Momumental Theater, Baltimore, Maryland, U.S.	
50	Win	28–10–11 (1)	Al Shubert	PTS	15	Jan 22, 1917	21 years, 225 days	Momumental Theater, Baltimore, Maryland, U.S.	
49	Win	27–10–11 (1)	Chick Hayes	NWS	10	Jan 4, 1917	21 years, 207 days	Marotta A.C., Cleveland, Ohio, U.S.	
48	Win	26–10–11 (1)	Battling Lahn	NWS	10	Nov 10, 1916	21 years, 152 days	Cleveland, Ohio, U.S.	
47	Win	25–10–11 (1)	Battling Lahn	NWS	10	Oct 7, 1916	21 years, 118 days	Cleveland, Ohio, U.S.	
46	Draw	24–10–11 (1)	Luke Ginley	PTS	10	Sep 4, 1916	21 years, 85 days	Cedar Point Arena, Sandusky, Ohio, U.S.	
45	Win	24–10–10 (1)	Frankie Brown	NWS	10	Aug 28, 1916	21 years, 78 days	Airdome A.C., Rochester, New York, U.S.	
44	Loss	23–10–10 (1)	Young Joey Mendo	NWS	10	Aug 7, 1916	21 years, 57 days	Airdome A.C., Rochester, New York, U.S.	
43	Loss	23–9–10 (1)	Young Joey Mendo	NWS	6	Jul 31, 1916	21 years, 50 days	Airdome A.C., Rochester, New York, U.S.	
42	Win	23–8–10 (1)	Mickey Byrne	NWS	10	May 25, 1916	20 years, 349 days	Gray's Armory, Cleveland, Ohio, U.S.	
41	Win	22–8–10 (1)	Luke Ginley	PTS	8	Apr 25, 1916	20 years, 319 days	Cleveland, Ohio, U.S.	
40	Win	21–8–10 (1)	Johnny Eggers	DQ	5 (?)	Dec 11, 1915	20 years, 183 days	Fairmont A.C., New York City, New York, U.S.	
39	Loss	20–8–10 (1)	Al Shubert	PTS	12	Oct 28, 1915	20 years, 139 days	Unity Cycle Club, Lawrence, Massachusetts, U.S.	
38	Draw	20–7–10 (1)	Battling Lahn	PTS	12	Oct 12, 1915	20 years, 123 days	Unity Cycle Club, Lawrence, Massachusetts, U.S.	
37	Loss	20–7–9 (1)	Al Shubert	PTS	12	Jun 23, 1915	20 years, 12 days	Thornton, Rhode Island, U.S.	
36	ND	20–6–9 (1)	Jim Mace	ND	10	May 15, 1915	19 years, 338 days	Broadway S.C., New York City, New York, U.S.	
35	Loss	20–6–9	Eddie O'Keefe	NWS	10	Apr 21, 1915	19 years, 314 days	Atlantic Garden A.C., New York City, New York, U.S.	
34	Loss	20–5–9	Al Schubert	PTS	12	Mar 4, 1915	19 years, 266 days	Lawrence, Massachusetts, U.S.	
33	Loss	20–4–9	Al Schubert	PTS	12	Feb 18, 1915	19 years, 252 days	Unity Cycle Club, Lawrence, Massachusetts, U.S.	
32	Win	20–3–9	Joe Daley	NWS	6	Feb 13, 1915	19 years, 247 days	Broadway S.C., New York City, New York, U.S.	
31	Loss	19–3–9	Willie Doyle	NWS	10	Jan 18, 1915	19 years, 221 days	Olympia Boxing Club, New York City, New York, U.S.	
30	Loss	19–2–9	Kid Herman	NWS	10	Dec 11, 1914	19 years, 183 days	Federal A.C., New York City, New York, U.S.	
29	Win	19–1–9	Jake Schiffer	NWS	10	Feb 2, 1914	18 years, 236 days	Grand Opera House, Youngstown, Ohio, U.S.	
28	Draw	18–1–9	Alvie Miller	NWS	10	Nov 17, 1913	18 years, 159 days	Canton Auditorium, Canton, Ohio, U.S.	
27	Draw	18–1–8	Alvie Miller	NWS	8	Sep 1, 1913	18 years, 82 days	League Park, Canton, Ohio, U.S.	
26	Draw	18–1–7	Alvie Miller	PTS	12	Apr 28, 1913	17 years, 321 days	Akron, Ohio, U.S.	
25	Win	18–1–6	Johnny Eggers	NWS	10	Feb 8, 1913	17 years, 242 days	Queensboro A.C., New York City, New York, U.S.	
24	Win	17–1–6	Danny Dunn	PTS	12	Dec 10, 1912	17 years, 182 days	Marotta A.C., Cleveland, Ohio, U.S.	
23	Win	16–1–6	Kid Murphy	PTS	12	Oct 17, 1912	17 years, 128 days	Cleveland A.C., Cleveland, Ohio, U.S.	
22	Win	15–1–6	Kid Murphy	PTS	10	Sep 27, 1912	17 years, 108 days	Cleveland A.C., Cleveland, Ohio, U.S.	
21	Draw	14–1–6	Porter Root	PTS	10	May 31, 1912	16 years, 355 days	Victor A.C., Cleveland, Ohio, U.S.	
20	Win	14–1–5	Kid Tepper	TKO	8 (8)	May 20, 1912	16 years, 344 days	Tuxedo Club, Cleveland, Ohio, U.S.	
19	Win	13–1–5	Julius Hess	TKO	3 (?)	Apr 18, 1912	16 years, 312 days	Victor A.C., Cleveland, Ohio, U.S.	
18	Win	12–1–5	Rip Starke	TKO	7 (10)	Mar 11, 1912	16 years, 274 days	Victor A.C., Cleveland, Ohio, U.S.	
17	Win	11–1–5	George St. Pierre	KO	6 (?)	Feb 27, 1912	16 years, 261 days	Elk's Club, Cleveland, Ohio, U.S.	
16	Win	10–1–5	Johnny Eggers	NWS	10	Feb 22, 1912	16 years, 256 days	National S.C., New York City, New York, U.S.	
15	Draw	9–1–5	Porter Root	PTS	10	Feb 12, 1912	16 years, 246 days	Moose Club, Cleveland, Ohio, U.S.	
14	Draw	9–1–4	Rip Starke	NWS	6	Jan 30, 1912	16 years, 233 days	Akron, Ohio, U.S.	
13	Win	9–1–3	Frankie Mason	PTS	10	Jan 26, 1912	16 years, 229 days	Social Seven Club, Sandusky, Ohio, U.S.	
12	Win	8–1–3	Julius Hess	PTS	10	Jan 9, 1912	16 years, 212 days	Tuxedo Club, Cleveland, Ohio, U.S.	
11	Win	7–1–3	Jimmy Lynn	NWS	10	Dec 23, 1911	16 years, 195 days	Gray's Armory, Cleveland, Ohio, U.S.	
10	Win	6–1–3	Tom Linn	PTS	6	Dec 18, 1911	16 years, 190 days	Corney's Hall, Cleveland, Ohio, U.S.	
9	Draw	5–1–3	Cal Delaney	NWS	10	Dec 12, 1911	16 years, 184 days	Broadway A.C., Cleveland, Ohio, U.S.	
8	Win	5–1–2	Jimmy Hector	PTS	10	Nov 16, 1911	16 years, 158 days	Moose Club, Cleveland, Ohio, U.S.	
7	Win	4–1–2	Kid Coffey	NWS	10	Oct 17, 1911	16 years, 128 days	Cleveland, Ohio, U.S.	
6	Loss	3–1–2	Cal Delaney	NWS	10	Oct 10, 1911	16 years, 121 days	Cleveland, Ohio, U.S.	
5	Win	3–0–2	Kid Schwertle	TKO	3 (?)	Sep 12, 1911	16 years, 93 days	Cleveland, Ohio, U.S.	
4	Draw	2–0–2	Julius Hess	NWS	10	Jun 6, 1911	15 years, 360 days	Columbia Theater, Cleveland, Ohio, U.S.	
3	Win	2–0–1	Johnny Griffiths	DQ	5 (10)	May 26, 1911	15 years, 349 days	Star Theatre, New Philadelphia, Ohio, U.S.	Griffiths was disqualified for hitting low
2	Win	1–0–1	Frankie Mason	NWS	10	May 1, 1911	15 years, 324 days	Cleveland, Ohio, U.S.	Exact date unknown
1	Draw	0–0–1	Cal Delaney	NWS	6	Apr 18, 1911	15 years, 311 days	Cleveland, Ohio, U.S.	

== See also ==
- List of super bantamweight boxing champions

== Achievements ==
Achievements
Inaugural Champion	World junior-featherweight Champion; September 21, 1922 – August 29, 1923	Succeeded by Carl Duane
