= Bobby Eber =

Canadian boxer (1902–1951)

Personal information
- Nickname: Bad News
- Born: Robert Silas Tabb; April 4, 1902 Hamilton, Ontario, Canada
- Died: October 31, 1951 (aged 49) Hamilton, Ontario, Canada
- Occupation: Boxer
- Height: 5 ft 5 in (165cm)
- Weight: Bantamweight

Boxing career
- Reach: 66 in (168cm)

Boxing record
- Total fights: 95
- Wins: 65
- Win by KO: 11
- Losses: 14
- Draws: 16

Bobby Eber (born Robert Silas Tabb; April 4, 1902 – October 31, 1951), nicknamed Bad News, was a Canadian professional bantamweight boxer. He was a two-time Canadian bantamweight boxing champion.

== Early life ==
Robert Silas Tabb was born on April 4, 1902, in Hamilton, Ontario, Canada.

== Professional boxing career ==
Tabb turned pro in 1917 at 16 years old. He launched his pro boxing career in Hamilton. His first fight was at Hamilton's Barton Street Arena during World War I.

He fought as Young Eber early on, and when he made his American debut, Buffalo sportswriters dubbed him Elbows McFadden for a defensive style similar to old-time boxer George "Elbows" McFadden. He transitioned to using the ring name Bobby Eber when he began working with boxing manager Hank Woods in 1919. It was the first part of the surname of one of his childhood friends, Eberfield.

=== Taking the Canadian bantamweight championship, May 1919 ===
Eber was hailed as the bantamweight champion of Canada by Hamilton newspapers and manager Hank Woods after his championship fight with Billy Hughes of Sault Ste. Marie in Toronto on May 28, 1919.

Eber and future world lightweight champion Jimmy Goodrich met four times in 1919. Following back-to-back draws in May and June, Eber won their August encounter, but Goodrich took the final bout by 10-round decision in London, Ontario, in September 1919. He fought 34 times in 1919 and lost only to Goodrich.

In January 1920, he scored a points win over Benny Gould at Toronto's Massey Hall.

He retained the Canadian bantamweight championship with a knockout of Percy Buzza in Winnipeg on February 10, 1920.

That year, Eber was in line for a world championship bout with Pete Herman, though local promoters scrapped it due to Herman's excessive purse demands. He later had a fight scheduled with Abe Goldstein, a contender who became bantamweight champion in 1924, but an infected ear forced him to withdraw shortly before the scheduled date. The fight was never rescheduled.

Eber met Billy Hughes in another bantamweight title bout in Cobalt, Ontario, in July 1920. The second round featured a double knockdown that referee Lou Marsh described as "one of the most unique things I ever saw in a boxing ring," while the fourth round saw Eber drop Hughes three times, with Hughes unable to make the count.

The bantamweight champion took a rematch bout with Benny Gould on 24 hours' notice in December 1920, losing on points after ten rounds.

Early in 1922, the 20-year-old boxer began a comeback under Walter Obernesser with a defeat of Harry Stone and a rematch win over Eddie Gallagher. He signed a contract in March 1922 to fight world bantamweight champion Johnny Buff, which never materialized.

In June 1922, he fought Eddie Pinchot of Charleroi to a ten-round draw in a non-title match, with referee Lou Marsh declaring it a draw following a split decision by the judges. Another bout was organized between the pair, this time with the bantamweight championship on the line. Eber successfully defended his title in the rematch against Pinchot at the Toronto Civic Arena on July 12, 1922.

He retained his title in a ten-round draw with Sonny Smith on November 6, 1922, and again on November 20, 1922.

Eber notably beat former world bantamweight champion Johnny Ertle in his hometown of Hamilton in November 1922. Less than a month later, he beat his opponent's brother, Mike Ertle, in a ten-round decision. At the time, the Ertle brothers were leading contenders for the world title.

On May 15, 1923, he faced New York's Midget Smith in a 10-round bout at the Hamilton Arena. Despite being knocked down for the first time in his career, he went on to outpoint Smith.

After wins over Johnny Curtin and Eddie Pinchot, Eber retained his Canadian title against unbeaten Donnie Mack after fighting to a 10-round draw in a championship bout on October 1, 1923.

During his 1924 campaign, he went 7–1–1. He beat Canadian featherweight champion Leo Roy by a split decision verdict on June 6, 1924, with no title at stake. Seven days later, he faced bantamweight challenger Carl Tremaine in a long-awaited rematch, winning after a low blow in the fifth round.

=== Losing the Canadian bantamweight championship, October 1924 ===
He lost the Canadian bantamweight championship to Howard Mayberry in Toronto on October 10, 1924.

=== Reclaiming the Canadian bantamweight championship, December 1925 ===
The former champion returned to the ring in mid-1925 and defeated Howard Mayberry, Rocky Flori, and Jackie Johnston.

Eber was granted a title shot and took on Vancouver's Vic Foley for the Canadian bantamweight championship at Toronto's Coliseum on December 11, 1925. He scored a clean knockdown in the second round but fell slightly behind on points during the early stages of the bantamweight bout. He rallied with a strong performance over the final five rounds to regain the Canadian bantamweight title.

In May 1926, he suffered a fifth-round knockout loss to world champion Charley Phil Rosenberg. Entering the bout with a rib injury from his previous fight, Eber became the target of body shots. After his corner threw in the towel, he kicked it out of the ring and the referee continued the fight. Rosenberg floored him two punches later, and the referee stopped the bout. Neither fighter met the bantamweight weight requirement, as Eber tipped the scales at 121½ pounds and Rosenberg at 126 pounds, removing the world title from contention.

In July 1926, he announced his retirement as the bantamweight boxing champion and abandoned his title. After Eber declined to meet either top-ranked challenger, Vic Foley or Jack Johnston, in a mandatory title defense, the Ontario Athletic Commission and Canadian Boxing Federation declared the championship vacant.

Between November 1926 and May 1927, he went on a five-fight campaign in California, going 2–1–2.

Eber fought until 1929 before he retired from boxing.

== Professional boxing record ==
87 fights	57 wins	14 losses
By knockout	11	1
By decision	46	13
Draws	16	

== Life after boxing ==
After his boxing career ended, he slipped into obscurity, which caused him depression.

In a court appearance reported from Hamilton on February 10, 1931, Eber was convicted of vagrancy and admitted to drug addiction. Before the magistrate, he stated that narcotics had "ruined him."

Eber remained in Hamilton for the rest of his life, where he operated a gym at King and McNab for a few years.

== Death ==
Bobby Eber died in Hamilton, Ontario, Canada, on October 31, 1951. He was interred at the Hamilton Cemetery.

Achievements
Preceded by Vacant	Canadian Bantamweight Champion; May 28, 1919 – October 10, 1924	Succeeded by Howard Mayberry
Preceded by Vic Foley	Canadian Bantamweight Champion; December 11, 1925 – July 27, 1926	Succeeded by Vacant
