= Charlie Phil Rosenberg =

American boxer (1902–1976)

Charley Rosenberg

Personal information
- Nationality: (United States) American
- Born: Charles Green; August 15, 1902 New York, New York
- Died: March 12, 1976 (aged 73) New York, New York
- Height: 5 ft 4 in (1.63 m)
- Weight: Bantamweight champion

Boxing career
- Stance: Orthodox

Boxing record
- Total fights: 70 (With newspaper decisions)
- Wins: 40
- Win by KO: 7
- Losses: 20
- Draws: 10

Charley Phil Rosenberg (Charles Green; August 15, 1902 – March 12, 1976) was an American boxer. He was the World Bantamweight Champion from 1925 to 1927. His trainers were the great Ray Arcel and Whitey Bimstein, and his manager was Harry Segal.

== Early life ==
Charlie Rosenberg was born in New York City's Lower East Side on August 15, 1902, as Charles Green. He came from a large family of nine siblings. Before he was born, his father died in an accident while working as a laborer at a clothing factory. His widowed mother Rachel, struggling to provide for the family, was forced to place three of his siblings in a Hebrew Orphan Asylum. When Charley was only five, his mother decided to move the family from the Lower East Side to Harlem, a more ethnically mixed section that still contained many Jews. Charley grew up poor and struggling in a neighborhood where children from different races and religions often competed in the streets to get by. Rosenberg was working as an errand boy for a millinery shop when co-worker Phil Rosenberg had to pull out of a scheduled match.

He won his bout substituting for Phil Rosenberg, and subsequently took his name as his ring moniker. He retained his real first name of Charlie.

== Early boxing career ==
Rosenberg began fighting as a bantamweight in 1921, and lost most of his fights through May 1922.

Charlie's manager Harry Segal, frustrated with Charlie's poor record in his early fights, may have intentionally overmatched him with Olympic Flyweight Champion Frankie Genaro around that time. Although losing the twelve round points decision at the Commonwealth Sporting Club against Genaro on May 23, 1922, the close fight could have gone either way, and Charlie's manager was impressed with his young boxer's ability to learn. Rosenberg had picked up pointers on bobbing, ducking, and effectively using his left, from Jewish boxing great Benny Valgar, while training at his gym. He would meet Genaro again on October 21, 1922, in another close twelve round bout. Rosenberg would become known for his speed, hard hitting ability, and cleverness in the ring.

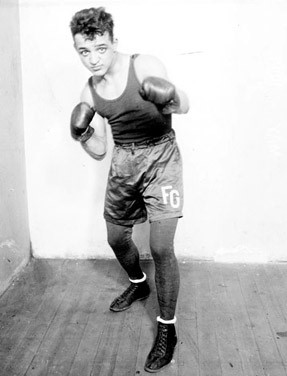
Frankie Genaro

After his first bout with Genaro, Rosenberg defeated important prospects Sammy Butts and Henry Catena. He won a twelve-round decision against the up-and-coming local bantamweight Butts in a semi-final bout at New York's Commonwealth Sporting Club on July 8, 1922. On October 30, 1923, he defeated the prolific Black boxer Danny Edwards, in a ten-round points decision at New York's Pioneer Sporting Club. Edwards would fight top talent in his long career, including several champions, but he had a three-inch height disadvantage against Rosenberg. The talented Black boxer had a lead in the first five rounds, but Rosenberg performed well enough in the final five to take the decision. In the sixth, Rosenberg battered Edwards with both hands to the face and body and nearly staggered him at the round's end with a right. Edwards showed experience and ring generalship to complete the final four rounds still on his feet as he tired.

He defeated Harry London on November 22, 1923, in a twelve-round points decision at the Commonwealth Sporting Club at 120 pounds. He then lost to talented future Bantamweight Champion Bud Taylor on October 19, 1923, in Madison Square Garden. In their twelve-round October decision, Rosenberg finished strong in the last two rounds when he caught Taylor with solid right hooks to the chin, though Taylor connected often, with a solid blow in the last round, and clearly won the first two rounds. Many in the crowd were disappointed in the ruling for Taylor, though he may have lost his advantage from an injured right hand in the fifth.

=== Bouts with Eddie Martin, 1923–24 ===
Rosenberg and "Cannonball" Eddie Martin, 1925 Bantamweight Champion of the World, met three times, twice in six-round decisions and once in a draw. On November 29, 1923, and January 28, 1924, Martin defeated Rosenberg, in close decisions on points, both times in New York's Madison Square Garden. In their third meeting, a fast and furious affair on April 29, 1924, Rosenberg gave Martin a closer battle which ended in a ten-round draw. Martin seemed to take the first four rounds, but in the next four Rosenberg slipped many of Martin's blows, and raked his opponent with well placed left jabs that may have dazed Martin at times. The match was again at Madison Square Garden and enthralled the 8,000 fans.

J. Curtin

Rosenberg defeated Irish boxer Johnny Curtin, one of his top bantamweight competitors, on October 10, 1924, in an important ten round points decision before a crowd at Madison Square Garden. In his career, Curtin would box most of the great bantamweights of his era.

Rosenberg won a ten-round decision from Black boxer Wilbur Cohen on November 15, 1924, in New York. Cohen fought the best fighters of his generation, including many champions, but their fight at Harlem's Commonwealth Sporting Club, brought limited publicity, likely because it was an early interracial bout.

== Bantamweight champion ==
Charlie won nine fights in a row in 1924, three by knockouts, and earned a title shot. He defeated Eddie Martin on March 20, 1925, to win the world bantamweight crown. The bout was a fifteen-round unanimous decision that took place in Madison Square Garden. Ray Arcel, his skilled handler, had prepared him well for the bout, and though Rosenberg had lost thirty-seven pounds in only two months of training, many ringside believed he gained momentum and strength in the final rounds. In the sweeping victory, the Lincoln Evening Journal wrote "Rosenberg had a clean margin in eleven of the fifteen rounds, and three were even." Martin appeared to have held a slight lead only in the early rounds. The Palm Beach Post noted that Rosenberg won using a "tantalizing left jab and a right uppercut, outboxing Martin at every turn and at the latter part of the match, holding his own in a furious toe-to-toe skirmish." Rosenberg had had trouble making weight for the bout, and needed to lose twenty pounds during his training. According to his trainer Ray Arcell, this had been a difficult process, though a successful one.

Rosenberg was described by Time magazine as:

wan as if he had spent his life loitering with La Belle Dame Sans Merci beside her autumnal lake, her birdless woods; his face was drawn, his body lean almost to emaciation. He was a young Jew, the challenger.... For 13 rounds, the sturdy champion took a dreadful drubbing.... At the end of the 15th round, the referee lifted the hand of the challenger, Charley ("Phil") Rosenberg, thus giving him the title of the champion.

=== Bantam title defense, 1925 ===
His most important title defense was against Eddie Shea on July 23, 1925, at New York's Velodrome. Rosenberg retained the New York Athletic Commission's World Bantamweight Title in a fourth-round TKO. Shea had the advantage until the third round, when Rosenberg began pounding Shea with blows to the midsection. In the fourth, Rosenberg floored Shea with a straight right, but somehow Shea managed to rise. Rosenberg then followed with a feinted left followed by a hard right which ended the fight. The blows looked authentic ringside, but the boxing commissioner Jim Farley considered the bout "suspicious" and banned both boxers from fighting in New York for life, though Rosenberg's ban was later lifted. Vast betting on the bout was one of the reasons for the suspicions of the commissioner.

On May 21, 1926, Rosenberg defeated the reigning Canadian Bantamweight champion Bobby Eber in Toronto, Canada in a non-title 5th-round knockout. Rosenberg was four pounds above the 118 pound weight limit, and would often have trouble making weight. Rosenberg floored the Canadian shortly after Eber had prevented his corner from ending the bout.

Fighting slightly over the top of bantamweight range, Rosenberg easily defeated former World bantamweight contender Benny Schwartz on January 3, 1927, in a twelve-round decision in Baltimore. At least one local paper felt Schwartz had fought well against the reigning champion and noted that Rosenberg was well over the bantamweight range and would have a difficult time against Bushy Graham.

== Loss of Bantam Title, 1927 ==
Rosenberg defeated Bushy Graham on February 4, 1927, in a fifteen-round decision at Madison Square Garden. He was only a slight favorite in early betting. Though he won the fight, he forfeited the title because he had exceeded the weight restriction for bantams by around four pounds. Both boxers and managers were punished for a secret agreement regarding whether they intended to make weight and how they would split the winnings. Rosenberg's manager Harry Segal, had his license revoked in New York. Rosenberg denied he had a secret arrangement with Graham, but both were suspended for a year.

Rosenberg won a few more matches fighting as a featherweight before his retirement in January 1929. His wins included opponents Harry Scott, Georgie Mack, and the ex-champion Johnny Dundee. In his close ten-round win by decision over Dundee on January 4, 1929, before 13,000 in Madison Square Garden, Rosenberg was down from a stiff right to the face in the fifth, though Dundee's two falls to the mat in the fourth and eighth may have been slips. Rosenberg fought at 132, and complained of fatigue at the end of the bout, though he fought several rounds delivering stinging rights to Dundee's jaw, and gave a flurry of blows to the older Dundee in the last ten seconds of most rounds. It was a close bout, and several ringside felt the combatants, who were certainly not the feature bout, were well past their prime.

== Life after boxing ==
In the early 1930s, Rosenberg served a jail term as a result of racketeering in the poultry industry in the Bronx.

In the late 1930s, Charley became an insurance salesman and stayed in the field for the next thirty years. In his later years, he managed several restaurants. Rosenberg died on March 12, 1976, at Jewish Memorial Hospital in New York City. He was survived by wife Elsie, a brother and two sisters.

Rosenberg's professional record in 65 bouts: won 33 (7 KOs), drew 8, lost 17, 7 no-decisions.

== Professional boxing record ==
All information in this section is derived from BoxRec, unless otherwise stated.

=== Official record ===
70 fights	33 wins	18 losses
By knockout	7	0
By decision	25	15
By disqualification	1	3
Draws	9	
Newspaper decisions/draws	10	

All newspaper decisions are officially regarded as “no decision” bouts and are not counted in the win/loss/draw column.

No.	Result	Record	Opponent	Type	Round	Date	Location	Notes
70	Win	33–18–9 (10)	Georgie Mack	PTS	8	Feb 11, 1929	Waltz Dream Arena, Atlantic City, New Jersey, U.S.	
69	Loss	32–18–9 (10)	Billy Kowalik	DQ	5 (8)	Feb 8, 1929	Broadway Auditorium, Buffalo, New York, U.S.	Low blow
68	Win	32–17–9 (10)	Johnny Dundee	PTS	10	Jan 4, 1929	Madison Square Garden, Manhattan, New York City, New York, U.S.	
67	Win	31–17–9 (10)	Harry Scott	PTS	6	Mar 10, 1928	Olympia Boxing Club, Manhattan, New York City, New York, U.S.	
66	Win	30–17–9 (10)	Bushy Graham	PTS	15	Feb 4, 1927	Madison Square Garden, Manhattan, New York City, New York, U.S.	Retained NYSAC and The Ring bantamweight titles
65	Win	29–17–9 (10)	Benny Schwartz	PTS	12	Jan 3, 1927	104th Regiment Armory, Baltimore, Maryland, U.S.	
64	Win	28–17–9 (10)	Joey Sangor	NWS	10	Dec 20, 1926	4th Regiment Armory, Jersey City, New Jersey, U.S.	
63	Win	28–17–9 (9)	Georgie Mack	NWS	10	Nov 29, 1926	4th Regiment Armory, Jersey City, New Jersey, U.S.	
62	Draw	28–17–9 (8)	Pete Sarmiento	PTS	10	Aug 27, 1926	Comiskey Park, Chicago, Illinois, U.S.	
61	Draw	28–17–8 (8)	Joey Sangor	PTS	10	Aug 13, 1926	Comiskey Park, Chicago, Illinois, U.S.	
60	Win	28–17–7 (8)	Midget Smith	DQ	5 (10)	Jul 30, 1926	Taylor Bowl, Newburgh Heights, Ohio, U.S.	
59	Loss	27–17–7 (8)	Willie Ames	NWS	10	May 27, 1926	Cleveland, Ohio, U.S.	
58	Win	27–17–7 (7)	Bobby Eber	KO	5 (10)	May 21, 1926	Toronto, Quebec, Canada	
57	Win	26–17–7 (7)	George Butch	NWS	12	Apr 30, 1926	Rayen-Wood Auditorium, Youngstown, Ohio, U.S.	
56	Win	26–17–7 (6)	George Butch	NWS	10	Mar 2, 1926	Coliseum, Saint Louis, Missouri, U.S.	
55	Loss	26–17–7 (5)	Doc Snell	DQ	6 (10)	Dec 30, 1925	Olympic Auditorium, Los Angeles, California, U.S.	
54	Loss	26–16–7 (5)	California Joe Lynch	PTS	10	Dec 2, 1925	Auditorium, Oakland, California, U.S.	
53	Win	26–15–7 (5)	Eddie Shea	KO	4 (15)	Jul 23, 1925	Velodrome, Manhattan, New York City, New York, U.S.	Retained NYSAC, NBA, and The Ring bantamweight titles
52	Loss	25–15–7 (5)	Pete Sarmiento	NWS	10	Jul 8, 1925	Olympic Arena, Brooklyn, New York City, New York, U.S.	
51	Win	25–15–7 (4)	Al Pettingill	TKO	2 (10)	Jun 1, 1925	Riverside Arena, Covington, Kentucky, U.S.	
50	Win	24–15–7 (4)	Herbie Schaeffer	NWS	10	May 29, 1925	Aurora Bowl, Aurora, Illinois, U.S.	
49	Draw	24–15–7 (3)	Harold Smith	NWS	10	May 22, 1925	East Chicago, Indiana, U.S.	
48	Win	24–15–7 (2)	Harry Gordon	NWS	10	May 11, 1925	Riverside Arena, Covington, Kentucky, U.S.	
47	Win	24–15–7 (1)	Clarence Rosen	NWS	12	Apr 27, 1925	Armory, Toledo, Ohio, U.S.	
46	Win	24–15–7	Eddie Martin	UD	15	Mar 20, 1925	Madison Square Garden, Manhattan, New York City, New York, U.S.	Won NYSAC, NBA, and The Ring bantamweight titles
45	Win	23–15–7	Nat Pincus	TKO	11 (12)	Mar 5, 1925	Rink S.C., Brooklyn, New York City, New York, U.S.	
44	Win	22–15–7	Harry Gordon	PTS	10	Feb 21, 1925	Commonwealth Sporting Club, Manhattan, New York City, New York, U.S.	
43	Win	21–15–7	Buck Josephs	PTS	10	Feb 10, 1925	Pioneer Sporting Club, Manhattan, New York City, New York, U.S.	
42	Win	20–15–7	Wilbur Cohen	PTS	10	Nov 15, 1924	Commonwealth Sporting Club, Manhattan, New York City, New York, U.S.	
41	Win	19–15–7	Joe Souza	TKO	10 (10)	Oct 20, 1924	Lenox A.C., Manhattan, New York City, New York, U.S.	
40	Win	18–15–7	Johnny Curtin	PTS	10	Oct 10, 1924	Madison Square Garden, Manhattan, New York City, New York, U.S.	
39	Win	17–15–7	Lewis Gaylor	KO	8 (10)	Sep 27, 1924	Commonwealth Sporting Club, Manhattan, New York City, New York, U.S.	
38	Win	16–15–7	Midget Mike Moran	PTS	12	Aug 23, 1924	Commonwealth Sporting Club, Manhattan, New York City, New York, U.S.	
37	Win	15–15–7	Joe Souza	PTS	12	Aug 15, 1924	Arena, Rockaway Beach, Queens, New York City, New York, U.S.	
36	Win	14–15–7	Sonny Smith	PTS	12	Jun 3, 1924	Henderson's Bowl, Brooklyn, New York City, New York, U.S.	
35	Draw	13–15–7	Eddie Martin	PTS	10	Apr 29, 1924	Madison Square Garden, Manhattan, New York City, New York, U.S.	
34	Win	13–15–6	Lewis Gaylor	PTS	6	Mar 18, 1924	Pioneer Sporting Club, Manhattan, New York City, New York, U.S.	
33	Loss	12–15–6	Eddie Martin	PTS	6	Jan 28, 1924	Madison Square Garden, Manhattan, New York City, New York, U.S.	
32	Win	12–14–6	KO Leonard	PTS	6	Dec 25, 1923	Arena, Philadelphia, Pennsylvania, U.S.	
31	Loss	11–14–6	Eddie Martin	PTS	6	Nov 29, 1923	Madison Square Garden, Manhattan, New York City, New York, U.S.	
30	Win	11–13–6	Billy Pimpus	TKO	4 (6)	Nov 5, 1923	Arena A.C., Philadelphia, Pennsylvania, U.S.	
29	Win	10–13–6	Danny Edwards	PTS	10	Oct 30, 1923	Pioneer Sporting Club, Manhattan, New York City, New York, U.S.	
28	Loss	9–13–6	Bud Taylor	PTS	12	Oct 19, 1923	Madison Square Garden, Manhattan, New York City, New York, U.S.	
27	Win	9–12–6	Harry London	PTS	12	Sep 22, 1923	Commonwealth Sporting Club, Manhattan, New York City, New York, U.S.	
26	Loss	8–12–6	Carl Duane	PTS	12	Jul 18, 1923	Velodrome, Manhattan, New York City, New York, U.S.	
25	Draw	8–11–6	Billy Ryckoff	PTS	12	Jun 30, 1923	Kingsboro Stadium, Brooklyn, New York City, New York, U.S.	
24	Draw	8–11–5	Carl Duane	PTS	6	Jun 9, 1923	Commonwealth Sporting Club, Manhattan, New York City, New York, U.S.	
23	Win	8–11–4	Manny Wexler	PTS	10	Apr 9, 1923	Fairmont A.C., Bronx, Manhattan, New York City, New York, U.S.	
22	Loss	7–11–4	Willie Darcy	PTS	12	Feb 26, 1923	Harlem-Fairmont A.C., Manhattan, New York City, New York, U.S.	
21	Draw	7–10–4	Sammy Cohen	PTS	6	Feb 16, 1923	Madison Square Garden, Manhattan, New York City, New York, U.S.	
20	Loss	7–10–3	Willie Darcy	PTS	12	Jan 15, 1923	Harlem-Fairmont A.C., Manhattan, New York City, New York, U.S.	
19	Loss	7–9–3	Jack Rose	PTS	6	Jan 5, 1923	Madison Square Garden, Manhattan, New York City, New York, U.S.	
18	Win	7–8–3	Johnny Imhouse	PTS	10	Dec 26, 1922	Pioneer Sporting Club, Manhattan, New York City, New York, U.S.	
17	Loss	6–8–3	Curly Wilshur	PTS	6	Dec 22, 1922	Madison Square Garden, Manhattan, New York City, New York, U.S.	
16	Loss	6–7–3	Frankie Genaro	PTS	12	Oct 21, 1922	Commonwealth Sporting Club, Manhattan, New York City, New York, U.S.	
15	Draw	6–6–3	Willie Darcy	PTS	4	Oct 12, 1922	Polo Grounds, Manhattan, New York City, New York, U.S.	
14	Win	6–6–2	Henny Catena	PTS	12	Sep 23, 1922	Commonwealth Sporting Club, Manhattan, New York City, New York, U.S.	
13	Loss	5–6–2	Murray Layton	DQ	2 (6)	Sep 11, 1922	NY Velodrome, Manhattan, New York City, New York, U.S.	
12	Win	5–5–2	Willie Darcy	PTS	10	Sep 2, 1922	Commonwealth Sporting Club, Manhattan, New York City, New York, U.S.	
11	Win	4–5–2	Mickey Nelson	PTS	10	Jul 21, 1922	Palace of Joy, Coney Island, New York, U.S.	
10	Win	3–5–2	Sammy Butts	PTS	12	Jul 8, 1922	Commonwealth Sporting Club, Manhattan, New York City, New York, U.S.	
9	Loss	2–5–2	Frankie Genaro	PTS	12	May 23, 1922	Commonwealth Sporting Club, Manhattan, New York City, New York, U.S.	
8	Loss	2–4–2	Bobby Bolin	PTS	12	May 13, 1922	Commonwealth Sporting Club, Manhattan, New York City, New York, U.S.	
7	Win	2–3–2	George Vanderbilt	PTS	8	May 2, 1922	Infantry Hall, Providence, Rhode Island, U.S.	
6	Draw	1–3–2	Al Tiernan	PTS	6	Apr 15, 1922	Commonwealth Sporting Club, Manhattan, New York City, New York, U.S.	
5	Loss	1–3–1	Bobby Bolin	PTS	6	Feb 28, 1922	Star S.C., Manhattan, New York City, New York, U.S.	
4	Loss	1–2–1	Al Diamond	PTS	8	Feb 6, 1922	Staten Island Coliseum, Staten Island, New York City, New York, U.S.	
3	Draw	1–1–1	Harry Martin	PTS	4	Nov 15, 1921	New York City, New York, U.S.	Precise date unknown
2	Loss	1–1	Charles Benyo	PTS	4	Oct 29, 1921	Commonwealth Sporting Club, Manhattan, New York City, New York, U.S.	
1	Win	1–0	Frankie Evans	PTS	6	Aug 15, 1921	Brooklyn Arena, Brooklyn, New York City, New York, U.S.	

=== Unofficial record ===
70 fights	40 wins	20 losses
By knockout	7	0
By decision	32	17
By disqualification	1	3
Draws	10	

Record with the inclusion of newspaper decisions in the win/loss/draw column.

No.	Result	Record	Opponent	Type	Round	Date	Location	Notes
70	Win	40–20–10	Georgie Mack	PTS	8	Feb 11, 1929	Waltz Dream Arena, Atlantic City, New Jersey, U.S.	
69	Loss	39–20–10	Billy Kowalik	DQ	5 (8)	Feb 8, 1929	Broadway Auditorium, Buffalo, New York, U.S.	Low blow
68	Win	39–19–10	Johnny Dundee	PTS	10	Jan 4, 1929	Madison Square Garden, Manhattan, New York City, New York, U.S.	
67	Win	38–19–10	Harry Scott	PTS	6	Mar 10, 1928	Olympia Boxing Club, Manhattan, New York City, New York, U.S.	
66	Win	37–19–10	Bushy Graham	PTS	15	Feb 4, 1927	Madison Square Garden, Manhattan, New York City, New York, U.S.	Retained NYSAC and The Ring bantamweight titles
65	Win	36–19–10	Benny Schwartz	PTS	12	Jan 3, 1927	104th Regiment Armory, Baltimore, Maryland, U.S.	
64	Win	35–19–10	Joey Sangor	NWS	10	Dec 20, 1926	4th Regiment Armory, Jersey City, New Jersey, U.S.	
63	Win	34–19–10	Georgie Mack	NWS	10	Nov 29, 1926	4th Regiment Armory, Jersey City, New Jersey, U.S.	
62	Draw	33–19–10	Pete Sarmiento	PTS	10	Aug 27, 1926	Comiskey Park, Chicago, Illinois, U.S.	
61	Draw	33–19–9	Joey Sangor	PTS	10	Aug 13, 1926	Comiskey Park, Chicago, Illinois, U.S.	
60	Win	33–19–8	Midget Smith	DQ	5 (10)	Jul 30, 1926	Taylor Bowl, Newburgh Heights, Ohio, U.S.	
59	Loss	32–19–8	Willie Ames	NWS	10	May 27, 1926	Cleveland, Ohio, U.S.	
58	Win	32–18–8	Bobby Eber	KO	5 (10)	May 21, 1926	Toronto, Quebec, Canada	
57	Win	31–18–8	George Butch	NWS	12	Apr 30, 1926	Rayen-Wood Auditorium, Youngstown, Ohio, U.S.	
56	Win	30–18–8	George Butch	NWS	10	Mar 2, 1926	Coliseum, Saint Louis, Missouri, U.S.	
55	Loss	29–18–8	Doc Snell	DQ	6 (10)	Dec 30, 1925	Olympic Auditorium, Los Angeles, California, U.S.	
54	Loss	29–17–8	California Joe Lynch	PTS	10	Dec 2, 1925	Auditorium, Oakland, California, U.S.	
53	Win	29–16–8	Eddie Shea	KO	4 (15)	Jul 23, 1925	Velodrome, Manhattan, New York City, New York, U.S.	Retained NYSAC, NBA, and The Ring bantamweight titles
52	Loss	28–16–8	Pete Sarmiento	NWS	10	Jul 8, 1925	Olympic Arena, Brooklyn, New York City, New York, U.S.	
51	Win	28–15–8	Al Pettingill	TKO	2 (10)	Jun 1, 1925	Riverside Arena, Covington, Kentucky, U.S.	
50	Win	27–15–8	Herbie Schaeffer	NWS	10	May 29, 1925	Aurora Bowl, Aurora, Illinois, U.S.	
49	Draw	26–15–8	Harold Smith	NWS	10	May 22, 1925	East Chicago, Indiana, U.S.	
48	Win	26–15–7	Harry Gordon	NWS	10	May 11, 1925	Riverside Arena, Covington, Kentucky, U.S.	
47	Win	25–15–7	Clarence Rosen	NWS	12	Apr 27, 1925	Armory, Toledo, Ohio, U.S.	
46	Win	24–15–7	Eddie Martin	UD	15	Mar 20, 1925	Madison Square Garden, Manhattan, New York City, New York, U.S.	Won NYSAC, NBA, and The Ring bantamweight titles
45	Win	23–15–7	Nat Pincus	TKO	11 (12)	Mar 5, 1925	Rink S.C., Brooklyn, New York City, New York, U.S.	
44	Win	22–15–7	Harry Gordon	PTS	10	Feb 21, 1925	Commonwealth Sporting Club, Manhattan, New York City, New York, U.S.	
43	Win	21–15–7	Buck Josephs	PTS	10	Feb 10, 1925	Pioneer Sporting Club, Manhattan, New York City, New York, U.S.	
42	Win	20–15–7	Wilbur Cohen	PTS	10	Nov 15, 1924	Commonwealth Sporting Club, Manhattan, New York City, New York, U.S.	
41	Win	19–15–7	Joe Souza	TKO	10 (10)	Oct 20, 1924	Lenox A.C., Manhattan, New York City, New York, U.S.	
40	Win	18–15–7	Johnny Curtin	PTS	10	Oct 10, 1924	Madison Square Garden, Manhattan, New York City, New York, U.S.	
39	Win	17–15–7	Lewis Gaylor	KO	8 (10)	Sep 27, 1924	Commonwealth Sporting Club, Manhattan, New York City, New York, U.S.	
38	Win	16–15–7	Midget Mike Moran	PTS	12	Aug 23, 1924	Commonwealth Sporting Club, Manhattan, New York City, New York, U.S.	
37	Win	15–15–7	Joe Souza	PTS	12	Aug 15, 1924	Arena, Rockaway Beach, Queens, New York City, New York, U.S.	
36	Win	14–15–7	Sonny Smith	PTS	12	Jun 3, 1924	Henderson's Bowl, Brooklyn, New York City, New York, U.S.	
35	Draw	13–15–7	Eddie Martin	PTS	10	Apr 29, 1924	Madison Square Garden, Manhattan, New York City, New York, U.S.	
34	Win	13–15–6	Lewis Gaylor	PTS	6	Mar 18, 1924	Pioneer Sporting Club, Manhattan, New York City, New York, U.S.	
33	Loss	12–15–6	Eddie Martin	PTS	6	Jan 28, 1924	Madison Square Garden, Manhattan, New York City, New York, U.S.	
32	Win	12–14–6	KO Leonard	PTS	6	Dec 25, 1923	Arena, Philadelphia, Pennsylvania, U.S.	
31	Loss	11–14–6	Eddie Martin	PTS	6	Nov 29, 1923	Madison Square Garden, Manhattan, New York City, New York, U.S.	
30	Win	11–13–6	Billy Pimpus	TKO	4 (6)	Nov 5, 1923	Arena A.C., Philadelphia, Pennsylvania, U.S.	
29	Win	10–13–6	Danny Edwards	PTS	10	Oct 30, 1923	Pioneer Sporting Club, Manhattan, New York City, New York, U.S.	
28	Loss	9–13–6	Bud Taylor	PTS	12	Oct 19, 1923	Madison Square Garden, Manhattan, New York City, New York, U.S.	
27	Win	9–12–6	Harry London	PTS	12	Sep 22, 1923	Commonwealth Sporting Club, Manhattan, New York City, New York, U.S.	
26	Loss	8–12–6	Carl Duane	PTS	12	Jul 18, 1923	Velodrome, Manhattan, New York City, New York, U.S.	
25	Draw	8–11–6	Billy Ryckoff	PTS	12	Jun 30, 1923	Kingsboro Stadium, Brooklyn, New York City, New York, U.S.	
24	Draw	8–11–5	Carl Duane	PTS	6	Jun 9, 1923	Commonwealth Sporting Club, Manhattan, New York City, New York, U.S.	
23	Win	8–11–4	Manny Wexler	PTS	10	Apr 9, 1923	Fairmont A.C., Bronx, Manhattan, New York City, New York, U.S.	
22	Loss	7–11–4	Willie Darcy	PTS	12	Feb 26, 1923	Harlem-Fairmont A.C., Manhattan, New York City, New York, U.S.	
21	Draw	7–10–4	Sammy Cohen	PTS	6	Feb 16, 1923	Madison Square Garden, Manhattan, New York City, New York, U.S.	
20	Loss	7–10–3	Willie Darcy	PTS	12	Jan 15, 1923	Harlem-Fairmont A.C., Manhattan, New York City, New York, U.S.	
19	Loss	7–9–3	Jack Rose	PTS	6	Jan 5, 1923	Madison Square Garden, Manhattan, New York City, New York, U.S.	
18	Win	7–8–3	Johnny Imhouse	PTS	10	Dec 26, 1922	Pioneer Sporting Club, Manhattan, New York City, New York, U.S.	
17	Loss	6–8–3	Curly Wilshur	PTS	6	Dec 22, 1922	Madison Square Garden, Manhattan, New York City, New York, U.S.	
16	Loss	6–7–3	Frankie Genaro	PTS	12	Oct 21, 1922	Commonwealth Sporting Club, Manhattan, New York City, New York, U.S.	
15	Draw	6–6–3	Willie Darcy	PTS	4	Oct 12, 1922	Polo Grounds, Manhattan, New York City, New York, U.S.	
14	Win	6–6–2	Henny Catena	PTS	12	Sep 23, 1922	Commonwealth Sporting Club, Manhattan, New York City, New York, U.S.	
13	Loss	5–6–2	Murray Layton	DQ	2 (6)	Sep 11, 1922	NY Velodrome, Manhattan, New York City, New York, U.S.	
12	Win	5–5–2	Willie Darcy	PTS	10	Sep 2, 1922	Commonwealth Sporting Club, Manhattan, New York City, New York, U.S.	
11	Win	4–5–2	Mickey Nelson	PTS	10	Jul 21, 1922	Palace of Joy, Coney Island, New York, U.S.	
10	Win	3–5–2	Sammy Butts	PTS	12	Jul 8, 1922	Commonwealth Sporting Club, Manhattan, New York City, New York, U.S.	
9	Loss	2–5–2	Frankie Genaro	PTS	12	May 23, 1922	Commonwealth Sporting Club, Manhattan, New York City, New York, U.S.	
8	Loss	2–4–2	Bobby Bolin	PTS	12	May 13, 1922	Commonwealth Sporting Club, Manhattan, New York City, New York, U.S.	
7	Win	2–3–2	George Vanderbilt	PTS	8	May 2, 1922	Infantry Hall, Providence, Rhode Island, U.S.	
6	Draw	1–3–2	Al Tiernan	PTS	6	Apr 15, 1922	Commonwealth Sporting Club, Manhattan, New York City, New York, U.S.	
5	Loss	1–3–1	Bobby Bolin	PTS	6	Feb 28, 1922	Star S.C., Manhattan, New York City, New York, U.S.	
4	Loss	1–2–1	Al Diamond	PTS	8	Feb 6, 1922	Staten Island Coliseum, Staten Island, New York City, New York, U.S.	
3	Draw	1–1–1	Harry Martin	PTS	4	Nov 15, 1921	New York City, New York, U.S.	Precise date unknown
2	Loss	1–1	Charles Benyo	PTS	4	Oct 29, 1921	Commonwealth Sporting Club, Manhattan, New York City, New York, U.S.	
1	Win	1–0	Frankie Evans	PTS	6	Aug 15, 1921	Brooklyn Arena, Brooklyn, New York City, New York, U.S.	

== Titles in boxing ==
=== Major world titles ===
- NYSAC bantamweight champion (118 lbs)
- NBA (WBA) bantamweight champion (118 lbs)

=== The Ring magazine titles ===
- The Ring bantamweight champion (118 lbs)

=== Undisputed titles ===
- Undisputed bantamweight champion

== Hall of Fame ==
Rosenberg was inducted into the International Jewish Sports Hall of Fame in 1990.

== See also ==
- List of bantamweight boxing champions
- List of select Jewish boxers

Achievements
Preceded by Eddie Martin	World Bantamweight Champion; March 20, 1925 – February 4, 1927; Vacated	Vacant Title next held by Panamá Al Brown
