= Carl Duane =

American boxer

Personal information
- Nickname: Bronx Steamroller
- Born: Carl Duane Yacconetti; June 25, 1902 New York, New York, USA
- Died: June 1, 1984 (aged 81)
- Height: 5 ft 5 1/2 in (1.66 m)
- Weight: Junior featherweight

Boxing career
- Stance: Orthodox

Boxing record
- Total fights: 65
- Wins: 43
- Win by KO: 13
- Losses: 16
- Draws: 6

Carl Duane (June 25, 1902 – June 23, 1984) also known as the "Bronx Steamroller", was an American boxer who held the World junior-featherweight title. During his career, Duane defeated such men as Charlie Phil Rosenberg, Lou Herley, Danny Edwards, Harry London, Young Montreal, Mickey Brown, Frankie Conway, and reigning champion Jack "Kid" Wolfe. He was managed by Mike Valentine.

== Professional career ==
Carl was born in New York City on June 25, 1902. His first professional fight was against Silent LaMont on April 6, 1921 winning by decision. In 1923 of August, he met Jack "Kid" Wolfe for the World junior-featherweight championship, as recognized by the NYSAC. Duane won over 12 rounds by unanimous decision.

After coming in well over the weight limit in a non-title bout with Frankie Jerome on November 22 of that year, Duane abandoned the junior-featherweight division to campaign at featherweight, thus vacating his title; the division didn't see a champion again until 1976 when Rigoberto Riasco won the inaugural WBC title, 53 years later.

Duane ended his career in 1929 after his decision loss to Al Singer. His overall record was 65 fights with 43 wins by decision and 13 by knockouts, 16 losses and 6 draw decisions. Duane was inducted into the New Jersey Boxing Hall of fame, posthumously, in 1984, shortly after his death career. Duane was featured on the cover of the March 1924 issue of The Ring magazine.

== See also ==
- List of super bantamweight boxing champions

Achievements
Preceded by Jack "Kid" Wolfe	World junior-featherweight Champion; August 29, 1923 - November 1923	Vacant Title next held by Rigoberto Riasco
