= Lou Marsh =

Canadian journalist and sportsperson (1879–1936)

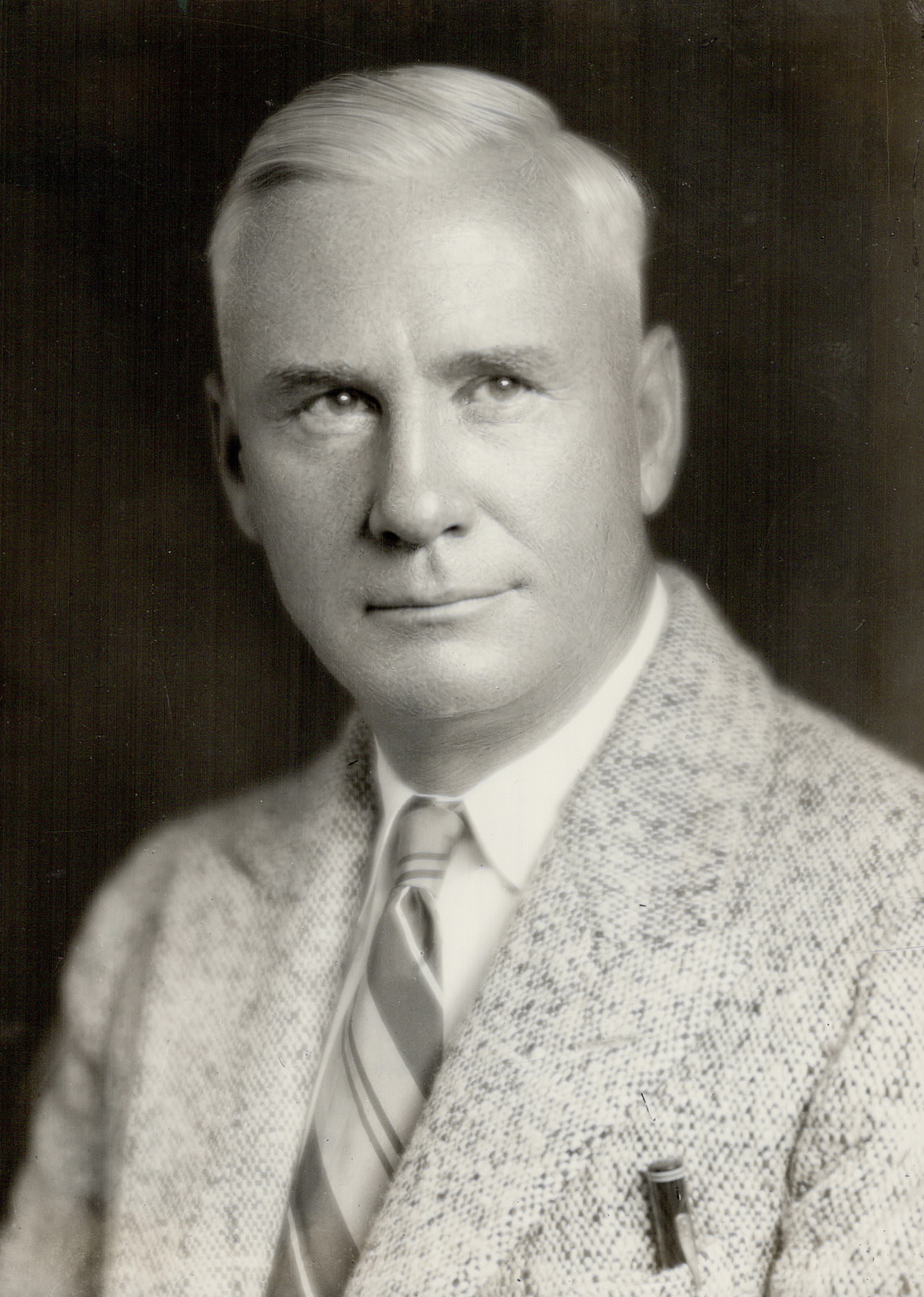
- Born: February 17, 1879; Campbellford, Ontario, Canada
- Died: March 4, 1936 (aged 57); Toronto, Ontario Canada
- Burial place: Park Lawn Cemetery
- Occupations: Journalist and referee
- Known for: Toronto Star sports editor
- Honours: Lou Marsh Trophy

Lewis Edwin Marsh (February 17, 1879 – March 4, 1936) was a Canadian multi-sport athlete, referee, and newspaper columnist. He is considered a pioneer of sports journalism in Canada, writing the Pick and Shovel daily column at the Toronto Star from 1925 to 1936. The "Lou Marsh Trophy" was awarded annually to the best athlete in Canada as decided by a panel of journalists, but was renamed to the Northern Star Award in 2022.

== Early life and athletics ==
Marsh was born in Campbellford, Ontario, and lived there until the age of nine, when he moved with his family to Toronto.

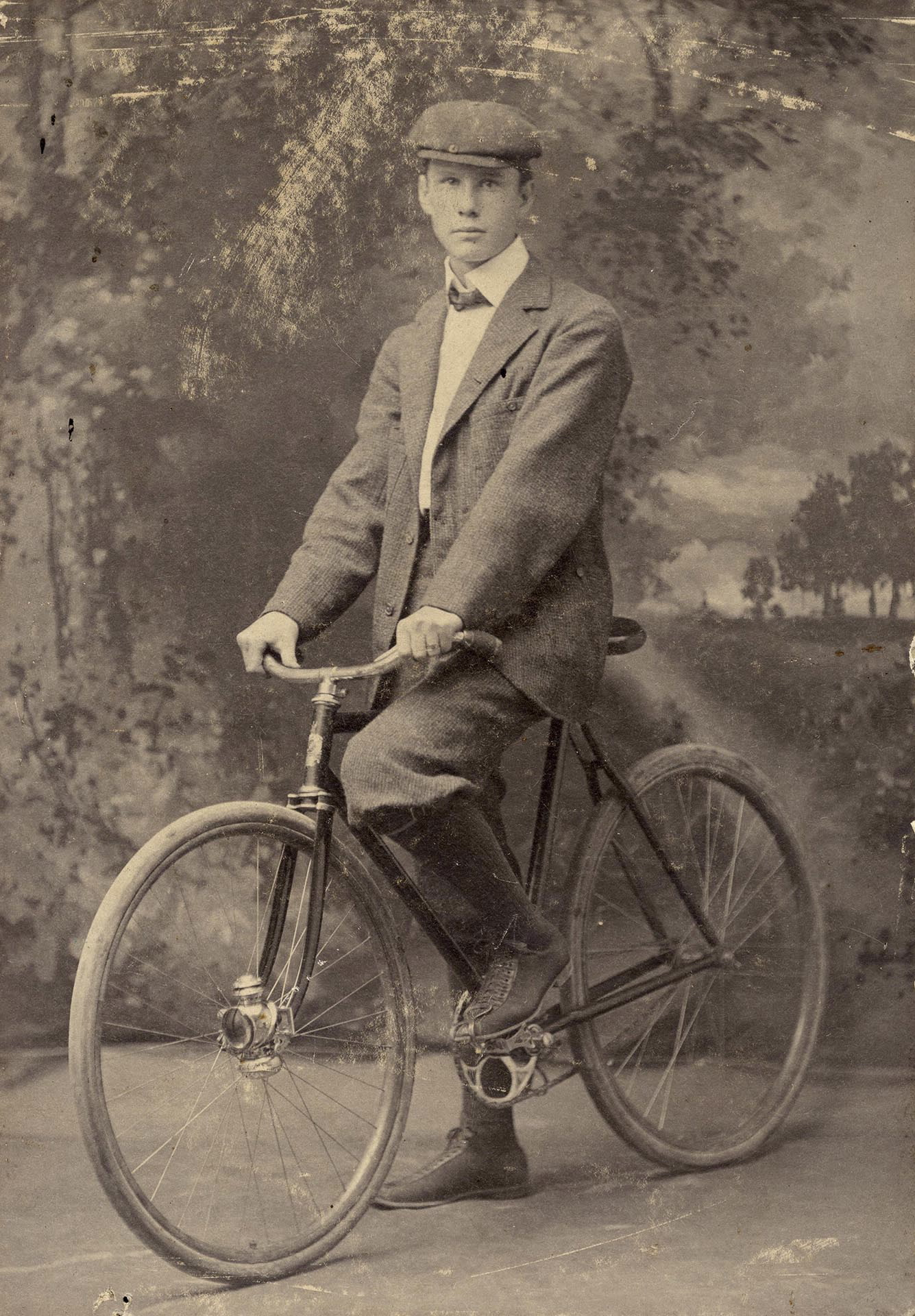
Marsh in the 1890s

As an athlete, Marsh's first love was sailing, and through his life he played a wide variety of sports. At the age of 21 he became interested in rugby, and played with some of the top teams in Toronto, including the Toronto Argonauts.

Marsh once defeated Canadian and Olympic champion Robert Kerr in a 120-yard hurdle race. He became a supporter of Tom Longboat and accompanied him to the 1908 Summer Olympics in London.

In May 1914, Marsh was aboard the first passenger airplane flight out of Toronto, taking off from Toronto and flying to Hamilton, Ontario and back.

During World War I, Marsh was an officer with The Canadian Grenadier Guards in the Canadian Expeditionary Force, enlisting with the 180th (Sportsmen) Battalion, CEF in 1916. He briefly served with the 87th Battalion (Canadian Grenadier Guards) in France before being sent back to Canada after being diagnosed with heart problems. He rose to the rank of major while serving in the military.

== Sports referee ==
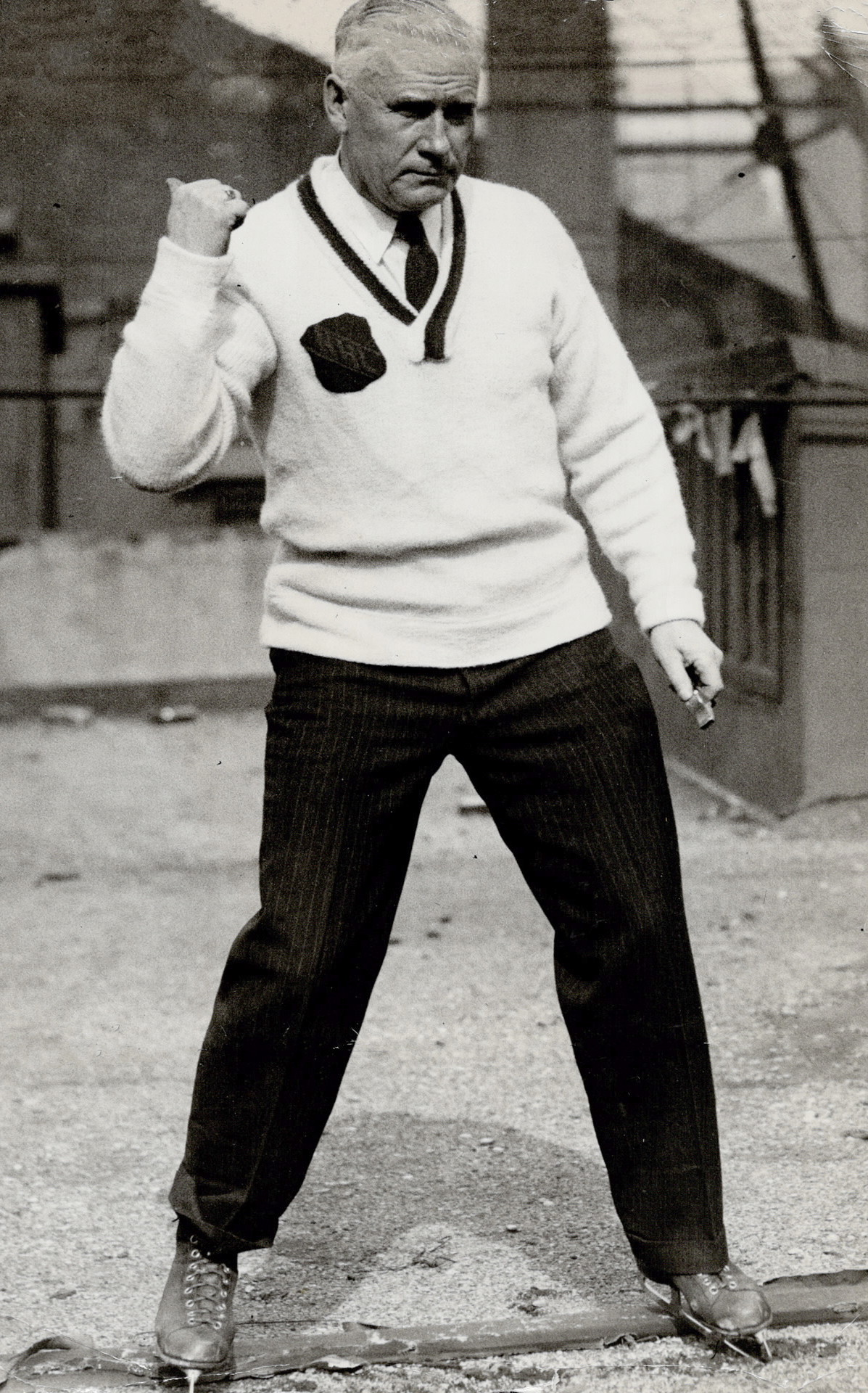
Marsh wearing an NHL referee uniform

Marsh was one of the top boxing and hockey referees of his era. He also worked as a referee in professional wrestling. During a match in Toronto in 1921, Marsh surprised the wrestlers after 30 minutes of showmanship by telling them that it was time to stop their exhibition and wrestle a real contest. He brought a similar attitude to his work as a boxing referee where, over the course of thousands of bouts, Marsh wasn't reluctant to demand action from the fighters. He was a referee in the National Hockey League, and saw action in Stanley Cup playoff games.

While in his 40s he was advised by doctors to stop working as a referee. Marsh's final appearance in the NHL was in the 1929 playoffs. In the late 1920s, he developed an interest in racing small outboard hydroplanes, which he called sea fleas. One of the most successful sea flea racers in Toronto was future Toronto Maple Leafs owner Harold Ballard.

When professional wrestling started coming to Toronto on a weekly basis in 1929, Marsh told readers right from the start that the matches were exhibitions and not real contests. In 1935, he coined the term sportive entertainment to describe professional wrestling—a term that in a slightly modified form would come to prominence fifty years later. One of his closest friends was Toronto wrestling and boxing promoter Jack Corcoran.

== Journalism career ==
At 14, in the first year after the launch of the Toronto Star, Marsh walked into the newspaper's office responding to a want ad and was hired as a copyboy. He rose to junior reporter, reporter, columnist (With Pick and Shovel was the name of his long-running column), assistant sports editor under W. A. Hewitt, and finally, in 1931, sports editor.

In 1931, he succeeded Hewitt as the Star's sports editor after Hewitt accepted a job as the first attractions manager of the new Maple Leaf Gardens. Marsh became an avid fisherman and hunter in his 50s, and made a return to officiating as a hockey referee at the 1932 Winter Olympics in Lake Placid, New York.

== Death and legacy ==
Marsh died unexpectedly at the age of 57 in 1936. The following day, the Toronto Star devoted 11 pages to coverage of his life and accomplishments, starting with a banner headline on page one. Before the end of the year, the Lou Marsh Trophy was created and named in his honour to honor Canada's top athlete. In 2022, the award was renamed due to Marsh's treatment of women and indigenous athletes in his writing.

Sports sociologist Janice Forsyth evaluated Marsh as follows: "What Marsh said about Longboat in his capacity as a Star reporter demonstrated his brilliant storytelling style and mastery of the written word. But it was also racist — and sickeningly so."

Marsh is buried at Park Lawn Cemetery in Toronto.
