= Leo Roy =

American boxer

Leo "Kid" Roy
Personal information
- Nickname: George Parker
- Nationality: American/Canadian
- Born: Leo Paradis; 1904 Lowell, Massachusetts, United States
- Died: 4 October 1955 (aged 51)
- Height: 5 ft 5 in (1.65 m)
- Weight: feather/lightweight

Boxing career

Boxing record
- Total fights: 98
- Wins: 72 (KO 20)
- Losses: 22 (KO 9)
- Draws: 3
- No contests: 1

Leo "Kid" Roy (1904 – 4 October 1955 (aged 51)) born in Lowell, Massachusetts, United States was an American/Canadian professional feather/lightweight boxer of the 1920s and 1930s who won the Canadian featherweight title, Canadian lightweight title, and British Empire featherweight title.

His professional fighting weight varied from 123 lb (56 kg; 8 st 11 lb), i.e. Featherweight to 130 1/2 lb (59.2 kg; 9 st 4.5 lb), i.e. Lightweight.

Roy was managed by Raoul Godbout.
