= Young Zulu Kid =

American boxer

Personal information
- Nickname: "Fighting Newsboy"
- Nationality: American
- Born: Giuseppe Di Melfi; April 22, 1897 Anzi, Italy
- Died: April 20, 1971 (aged 73) New York City, United States
- Height: 4 ft 11 in (150 cm)
- Weight: Flyweight

Boxing career

Young Zulu Kid (born Giuseppe Di Melfi, April 22, 1897 – April 20, 1971) was a professional boxer.

He lost to Jimmy Wilde for the first ever world flyweight boxing championship.

Di Melfi also lost to Frankie Burns.

He also defeated Jackie Sharkey.

Di Melfi has a child named Joe Di Melfi who has recently been on The Michael Kay Show.
