= Jackie Sharkey =

Italian boxer (1897–1970)

- Sharkey in 1909

Personal information
- Nicknames: Jack Sharkey; Little Jackie Sharkey
- Nationality: American
- Born: Giovanni Cervati; June 20, 1897 Bologna, Emilia Romagna, Italy
- Died: March 1, 1970 (aged 72)
- Height: 5 ft 3 in (1.60 m)
- Weight: Bantamweight; Junior Lightweight

Boxing career
- Stance: Orthodox

Boxing record
- Total fights: 147
- Wins: 58
- Win by KO: 2
- Losses: 63
- Draws: 23
- No contests: 3

Jackie Sharkey or Jack Sharkey (born Giovanni Cervati) was an Italian-born American boxer who made a claim to the World Bantamweight Title on August 15, 1919, defeating reigning champion Pete Herman in a ten-round, non-title bout in Milwaukee, Wisconsin. His claim to the title was not universally recognized. Jack Sharkey, also known as Little Jackie Sharkey, should not be confused with the heavyweight champion Jack Sharkey.

== Early life and career ==
Jackie Sharkey was born Giovanni Cervati in Bologna, Emilia Romagna, Italy on June 20, 1897, though he would live most of his life in New York City. In his early professional career between May 23, 1914, and February 21, 1916, fighting almost exclusively in the New York area, he won three and lost six bouts, with one draw.

On February 21, 1916, Sharkey lost to Jewish boxer Abe Friedman at the Olympia Boxing Club in New York in a ten-round newspaper decision. Friedman would become a competent bantamweight fringe contender during his career taking the USA New England Bantamweight Title in 1921.

On June 2, 1916, Sharkey lost to Young Zulu Kid in a fifth-round knockout at the Vanderbilt Athletic Club in Brooklyn, New York. By that year, Zulu Kid had established himself as a serious world flyweight contender.

=== Draw with Johnny Coulon, February 1917 ===
On February 5, 1917, Sharkey drew with former World Bantamweight champion Johnny Coulon in a ten-round newspaper decision at the Pioneer Sporting Club in New York. Local newspapers disagreed on the decision. Coulon held the World Bantamweight Championship from 1911 to 1913, though the title was not unified at the time.

On July 27, 1917, Sharkey first lost to Kid Williams in six rounds at Oriole Park in Baltimore, at least by the newspaper decision of the Baltimore Sun. He lost to Williams again on April 1, 1918, in a twelve-round points decision at the Lyric Theater in Baltimore. Williams held the World Bantamweight Title from June 1914 to January 1917.

=== Bouts with December 1920 World Bantamweight Champion Joe Lynch 1916–25 ===
Sharkey first met Joe Lynch on September 26, 1916, in the star bout at the Pioneer Sporting Club in New York, losing in ten-round newspaper decisions of the New York Times and New York Tribune. They met on February 27, 1917, and Sharkey lost again by a ten-round decision of three New York newspapers at the Pioneer Sports Club in New York City. Sharkey was down in the fifth round, after which Lynch had little trouble penetrating his defenses. The bout was an elimination series for the bantamweight championship, and Lynch had some difficulty with Sharkey in the early rounds.

Sharky and Joe Lynch drew in a fifteen-round points decision at New York's Madison Square Garden on September 28, 1920, although Lynch was down in several rounds from the blows of Sharkey. Sharkey's ability to stay fifteen rounds with a top bantamweight contender put him squarely in the list of top contenders himself. On December 2, 1920, in a somewhat more historic bout, Lynch defeated Sharkey in a fifteenth-round knockout at Madison Square Garden. Sharkey had the better of the bout up until the sixth round, when Lynch became far more dominant. Lynch's win gave him the right to challenge Pete Herman for the Bantamweight Championship three weeks later. On July 2, 1925, at the Polo Grounds in New York, home of the New York Giants, the two drew in four rounds to a large house in which Lynch was somewhat favored to win.

=== Seven bouts with top bantamweight contender Frankie Burns, 1916–18 ===
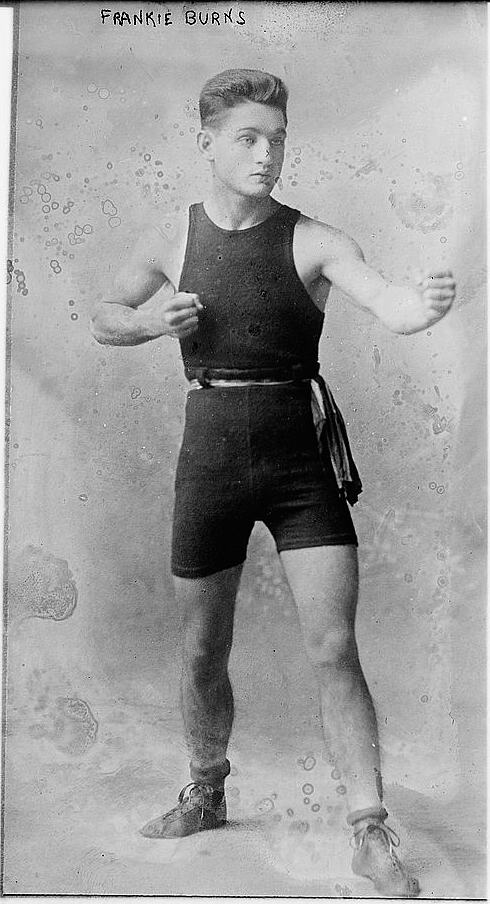
Frankie Burns

Sharkey met Frankie Burns seven times during his career, but had little luck with the highly rated bantamweight contender. Beginning on November 27, 1916, Sharkey faced a ten-round loss by newspaper decision from Burns in New York, followed by a ten-round loss on February 9, 1917, at the Harlem Sports Club in New York by newspaper decision of the New York Sun. Sharkey sank to the mat in the sixth round and claimed a foul, though he recovered by the seventh. He fought the first two rounds "like a whirlwind" and looked to have an advantage, but lost his pace in subsequent rounds. In the third, Sharkey was stunned by a left hook to his midriff that may have affected him for the remainder of the bout.

On October 15, 1917, he lost to Burns in a newspaper decision ten rounder in Albany, New York. Burns was "too clever" for Sharkey and "won by use of constant left jabs and right handers to the body". Sharkey fell to a ten-round loss by newspaper decision in Scranton, Pennsylvania, on February 21, 1918. In their February 21 Jersey City Town Hall bout, Burns was described as easily outpointing his opponent, and taking seven of the ten rounds, with only one to Sharkey before a substantial house of 4000. On June 20, 1918, he drew with Burns in a six-round newspaper decision in Madison Square Garden, and he lost to Burns again at the Garden in their last bout on November 16 in a six-round newspaper decision of the New York Times. Burns was eight years older than Sharkey, but seemed a difficult opponent to defeat. On July 13, 1920, Sharkey lost to Burns in a twelve-round newspaper decision of the Philadelphia Record at the Outdoor Arena of the Armory in Jersey City, New Jersey. As a highly rated Bantamweight, Burns contended four times for the World Bantamweight Championship between 1912 and 1917.

On April 6, 1918, Sharkey defeated Joe Tuber at the National Athletic Club in Philadelphia in a six-round newspaper decision of the Philadelphia Inquirer. The bout was described as sensational and Sharkey was considered to have been in his best form with a clear advantage.

On March 24, 1919, Sharkey lost to Jackie "Kid" Wolfe in a ten-round newspaper decision of the Bridgeport Standard Telegram at the Grand Theater in Cleveland, Ohio.

On May 3, 1920, Sharkey lost to Jewish boxer Young Montreal, aka Morris Billingkoff, in a twelve-round points decision at Infantry Hall in Providence, Rhode Island. Young Montreal was a skilled opponent who was a contender for the World Bantamweight Championship for a ten-year period.

== Championship fights ==
Champion Pete Herman

Sharkey first defeated Pete Herman in a six-round newspaper decision of two local newspapers at the National Athletic Club in Philadelphia on May 4, 1918. The victory over the reigning bantamweight champion was described as "a clean cut lacing", and several newspapers agreed Sharkey had the advantage in the bout. Due to a smaller house than expected, Sharkey was poorly compensated for his victory. Sharkey was described as the aggressor through most of the bout and able to stand punch for punch with the champion. On September 2, 1918, Sharkey again fared well against Herman in a non-title six-round match at the Olympia Club in Philadelphia although it ended in a no-decision and more newspapers gave the advantage to Herman. Sharkey was described as the aggressor and always forcing the pace, though more newspapers felt Herman deserved to win having better timed and more effective punches. The fight was close and Sharkey made Herman extend himself.

=== Championship ===
Sharkey briefly claimed the World Bantamweight Championship on August 15, 1919, in a ten-round newspaper decision against Herman in a no-decision bout in Milwaukee, Wisconsin, winning by a fairly close margin. Sharkey's claim was not recognized at the time, as he would have had to win by knockout or technical knockout to take the title, or to have won by the decision of a referee. The majority of newspaper reports gave Sharkey the edge. On September 15, 1919, Sharkey again had the edge over Herman in a World Bantamweight Championship match in Detroit, Michigan in a ten-round newspaper decision by the Detroit Free Press, though it was fairly close. According to one source, Sharkey was the aggressor, though Herman landed the more telling blows. On September 11, 1920, Sharkey again defeated Herman in a non-title, fifteen-round newspaper decision of the Chicago Tribune in East Chicago, Indiana, though Herman held the World Bantamweight Championship at the time. Sharkey claimed fouls in the fifth and seventh rounds which were not allowed by the referee. Sharkey was the aggressor throughout which earned him the advantage according to several newspapers. Sharkey's claim to the title was stripped on September 11, 1920.

=== Jimmy Wilde fight ===
On December 6, 1919, Sharkey defeated British champion Jimmy Wilde in a ten-round newspaper decision of the Milwaukee Journal before a crowd close to 8,000 at the Auditorium in Milwaukee, Wisconsin. Sharkey was considered a decisive winner, taking eight of the ten rounds according to the newspapermen at ringside. Sharkey's blows were said to land more frequently and with greater force. Sharkey's win was at least a minor upset as Wilde led in the early betting 2 to 1. Sharkey's purse was $20,000 and he achieved notoriety that would help him command more for his future bouts. An exceptional opponent, Wilde would take the British and European Flyweight Championships in that year, and the World Flyweight Championship by 1920.

=== Charles Ledoux fight ===
On October 15, 1920, Sharkey defeated French boxer Charles Ledoux in a fifteen-round points decision at Madison Square Garden. In his career, Ledoux would take both the European and French bantamweight championships. Sharkey appeared to have a clear advantage in the first three rounds and Ledoux was very briefly down in the second.

=== Johnny Buff fight ===
On November 10, 1921, Sharkey lost to Johnny Buff in a fifteen-round World Bantamweight Championship by points decision at Madison Square Garden. In the close and exciting fight, Sharkey had five rounds, six went to Buff, and four were even. Both boxers took the lead at times, but Buff finished stronger. The Des Moines Register called it "as rousing a battle as ever you'd wish to see." Most newspapers gave the fight to Buff, who held the World Bantamweight title at the time. The New York Times gave Sharkey the seventh, eighth and ninth rounds, while Buff took eleven of the remaining rounds, with one even. The final rounds seemed to clearly belong to Buff. Sharkey had lost to Buff on January 15, 1920, in an eight-round newspaper decision of the Jersey Journal in Jersey City, New Jersey.

=== Johnny Dundee fight ===
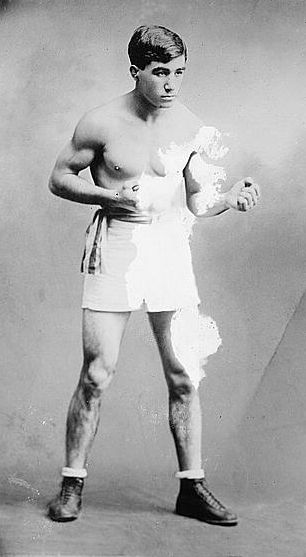
Johnny Dundee

On July 6, 1922, Sharkey lost to Johnny Dundee in a fifteen-round points decision of a Junior Lightweight Championship bout at Ebbets Field in Brooklyn with an attendance of around 15,000. Sharkey was down briefly in the fourth and again in the fifteenth in what several boxing critics considered only a modest showing for Dundee. The New York Evening World wrote that Dundee was "losing his fighting fire", by allowing the bout to go fifteen rounds. The Evening World considered Dundee to have taken every round, though Sharkey made a strong showing in the early part of the fourth. The Evening World described the fighting as somewhat refrained though there was a stronger showing in the fourth and fourteenth rounds. Though Sharkey came out strong in the fourteenth with a blow to Dundee's jaw, Dundee answered and the close exchange was short lived, with both boxers fighting with more reserve through the fifteenth. The bout was quite exciting and Sharkey was said to excel at infighting having a reach advantage over Dundee. In the early betting, at least among New York newspapers like the New York Tribune, Dundee seemed a clear favorite. The fight was close according to some newspapers and pushed Dundee to his limits, though he won "by a shade". Sharkey never again competed for a world championship.

Fighting at 127 pounds as a junior lightweight, on June 19, 1923, Sharkey lost to Pete Zivic at Queensboro Stadium in Queens, New York in a twelve-round points decision. Zivic was a competent junior lightweight, but Sharkey's record included many losses after his loss to Johnny Dundee on July 6, 1922. Sharkey had nearly a six-pound weight advantage over Zivic though he lacked a few inches in reach.

=== Frankie Fasano fight and aftermath ===
On December 2, 1924, Sharkey lost on a second round disqualification against Frankie Fasano when he reportedly and uncharacteristically attacked the referee. He had claimed to be a victim of a foul which the referee disallowed. According to the New York Times, the event greatly disquieted the audience. After he struck referee Eddie Purdy in the jaw, his boxing license was revoked the following day and he did not box for the remainder of the year. He boxed in New York four months later in April 1925. On May 14, 1925, he lost again to Fasano in a ten-round points decision at Manhattan Casino in New York after being reinstated. He lost his momentum by the second round.

== Retirement from boxing, 1926 ==
Sharkey retired from boxing around May 1926, with a ten-round points decision loss to Young Mulligan in Norwalk, Connecticut. He had lost two prior bouts by newspaper decision since September 1925, as well as a third-round TKO to Jewish boxer Red Chapman on October 23, 1925. In September 1927, the talented Chapman would lose to Benny Bass in a close bout for the NBA World Featherweight Championship in Philadelphia.

Sharkey was twenty-eight years old when he retired from the ring. He died on March 1, 1970, at the age of 72.

== Professional boxing record ==
All information in this section is derived from BoxRec, unless otherwise stated.

=== Official record ===
148 fights	19 wins	26 losses
By knockout	2	9
By decision	15	16
By disqualification	2	1
Draws	13	
No contests	2	
Newspaper decisions/draws	88	

All newspaper decisions are officially regarded as “no decision” bouts and are not counted in the win/loss/draw column.

No.	Result	Record	Opponent	Type	Round, time	Date	Age	Location	Notes
148	Loss	19–26–13 (90)	Young Mulligan	PTS	10	May 25, 1926	28 years, 339 days	Armory, Norwalk, New Jersey, US	
147	Win	19–25–13 (90)	Georgie Sanders	PTS	8	Feb 22, 1926	28 years, 247 days	Hot Springs, Arkansas, US	
146	Loss	18–25–13 (90)	Giovanni Salerno	NWS	10	Nov 6, 1925	28 years, 139 days	Floral Park Arena, North Bergen, New Jersey, US	
145	Loss	18–25–13 (89)	Red Chapman	TKO	3 (10)	Oct 23, 1925	28 years, 125 days	Lawrence, Massachusetts, US	
144	Loss	18–24–13 (89)	Johnny Kochansky	NWS	10	Sep 8, 1925	28 years, 80 days	Jersey City, New Jersey, US	
143	ND	18–24–13 (88)	Petey Mack	ND	12	Aug 3, 1925	28 years, 44 days	Jersey City, New Jersey, US	
142	Loss	18–24–13 (87)	Harry London	TKO	4 (10)	Aug 1, 1925	28 years, 42 days	Hollywood Baseball Park, Long Branch, New Jersey, US	Sharkey fell out of the ring and could not continue
141	Win	18–23–13 (87)	Midget Mike Moran	NWS	10	Jul 24, 1925	28 years, 34 days	Bayonne, Louisiana, US	
140	NC	18–23–13 (86)	Pete Sarmiento	NC	3 (12)	Jul 16, 1925	28 years, 26 days	Dexter Park Stadium, New Jersey, US	Rain came down so hard the canvas became water-soaked and slippery and the bout had to be stopped
139	Win	18–23–13 (85)	Johnny Curtin	NWS	12	Jul 6, 1925	28 years, 16 days	Oakland AA, Jersey City, New Jersey, US	
138	Draw	18–23–13 (84)	Joe Lynch	PTS	4	Jul 2, 1925	28 years, 12 days	Polo Grounds, New York City, New York, US	
137	Loss	18–23–12 (84)	Frankie Fasano	PTS	10	May 13, 1925	27 years, 327 days	Manhattan Casino, New York City, New York, US	
136	Win	18–22–12 (84)	Harry London	PTS	10	Apr 29, 1925	27 years, 313 days	Manhattan Casino, New York City, New York, US	
135	Win	17–22–12 (84)	Willie Tucker	KO	1 (?)	Apr 23, 1925	27 years, 307 days	Columbus Hall, Yonkers, New York, US	
134	Loss	16–22–12 (84)	Eddie Bowen	NWS	10	Apr 1, 1925	27 years, 285 days	Barracks, Washington, DC, US	
133	Loss	16–22–12 (83)	Frankie Fasano	DQ	2 (?)	Dec 2, 1924	27 years, 165 days	Pioneer Sporting Club, New York City, New York, US	Sharkey claimed a foul, but the referee disagreed. Sharkey attacked him and was DQ'd.
132	Win	16–21–12 (83)	Willie Duffy	PTS	10	Nov 13, 1924	27 years, 146 days	Columbus Hall, Yonkers, New York, US	
131	Loss	15–21–12 (83)	Izzy Cooper	PTS	6	Oct 27, 1924	27 years, 129 days	Broadway Arena, New York City, New York, US	
130	Win	15–20–12 (83)	Jack Dalton	PTS	8	Mar 13, 1924	26 years, 267 days	Shreveport, Louisiana, US	
129	Loss	14–20–12 (83)	Eddie McKenna	TKO	8 (15)	Feb 18, 1924	26 years, 243 days	Coliseum Arena, New Orleans, Louisiana, US	
128	Loss	14–19–12 (83)	Jack Lockhart	KO	1 (4)	Sep 26, 1923	26 years, 98 days	Arena, Seattle, Washington, US	
127	Loss	14–18–12 (83)	George Marks	PTS	4	Sep 18, 1923	26 years, 90 days	Arena, Vernon, California, US	
126	Loss	14–17–12 (83)	Peter Zivic	PTS	12	Jun 19, 1923	25 years, 364 days	Queensboro Stadium, New York City, New York, US	
125	Win	14–16–12 (83)	Mickey Brown	PTS	12	Jun 8, 1923	25 years, 353 days	Rink SC, New York City, New York, US	
124	Loss	13–16–12 (83)	Johnny Curtin	PTS	8	Jun 2, 1923	25 years, 347 days	Polo Grounds, New York City, New York, US	
123	Loss	13–15–12 (83)	Charlie Beecher	PTS	8	Apr 23, 1923	25 years, 307 days	Coliseum, Chicago, Illinois, US	
122	Loss	13–14–12 (83)	Johnny Curtin	NWS	12	Jan 8, 1923	25 years, 202 days	4th Regiment Armory, Jersey City, New Jersey, US	
121	Loss	13–14–12 (82)	Tommy Gerrard	NWS	12	Jan 1, 1923	25 years, 195 days	Arena, Trenton, New Jersey, US	
120	Loss	13–14–12 (81)	Sammy Sieger	PTS	12	Jul 29, 1922	25 years, 39 days	Queensboro Stadium, New York City, New York, US	
119	Loss	13–13–12 (81)	Johnny Dundee	UD	15	Jul 6, 1922	25 years, 16 days	Ebbets Field, New York City, New York, US	For NYSAC super featherweight title
118	Win	13–12–12 (81)	Jack Hausner	PTS	12	Jun 2, 1922	24 years, 347 days	Palace of Joy, New York City, New York, US	
117	Draw	12–12–12 (81)	Vincent 'Pepper' Martin	PTS	12	May 20, 1922	24 years, 334 days	Ebbets Field, New York City, New York, US	
116	Win	12–12–11 (81)	Roy Moore	PTS	12	May 9, 1922	24 years, 323 days	Pioneer Sporting Club, New York City, New York, US	
115	Win	11–12–11 (81)	Harry London	PTS	12	Apr 29, 1922	24 years, 313 days	Commonwealth Sporting Club, New York City, New York, US	
114	Win	10–12–11 (81)	Joe O'Donnell	NWS	8	Apr 20, 1922	24 years, 304 days	Ice Palace, Philadelphia, Pennsylvania, US	
113	Win	10–12–11 (80)	Sammy Nable	PTS	12	Apr 11, 1922	24 years, 295 days	Pioneer Sporting Club, New York City, New York, US	
112	Win	9–12–11 (80)	Willie Spencer	PTS	12	Mar 28, 1922	24 years, 281 days	Pioneer Sporting Club, New York City, New York, US	
111	Loss	8–12–11 (80)	Johnny Brown	NWS	10	Mar 17, 1922	N/A	Philadelphia, Pennsylvania, US	Exact date and venue unknown
110	Win	8–12–11 (79)	Earl McArthur	NWS	10	Feb 27, 1922	24 years, 252 days	Edgewater Garden, Sioux City, Iowa, US	
109	Loss	8–12–11 (78)	Johnny Buff	PTS	15	Nov 10, 1921	24 years, 143 days	Madison Square Garden, New York City, New York, US	For NYSAC and NBA bantamweight titles
108	Loss	8–11–11 (78)	William Vincent	PTS	8	Oct 7, 1921	24 years, 109 days	Madison Square Garden, New York City, New York, US	
107	Draw	8–10–11 (78)	Sammy Nable	PTS	12	Sep 26, 1921	24 years, 98 days	Broadway Arena, New York City, New York, US	
106	Win	8–10–10 (78)	Roy Moore	NWS	10	Sep 9, 1921	24 years, 81 days	Twin Cities AC, East Chicago, Indiana, US	
105	Draw	8–10–10 (77)	Cowboy Eddie Anderson	PTS	12	Aug 26, 1921	24 years, 67 days	Palace of Joy, New York City, New York, US	
104	Draw	8–10–9 (77)	Joe Burman	PTS	10	Jun 21, 1921	24 years, 1 day	Boxing Drome, New York City, New York, US	
103	Draw	8–10–8 (77)	Willie Spencer	PTS	12	Jun 10, 1921	23 years, 355 days	Palace of Joy, New York City, New York, US	
102	Win	8–10–7 (77)	Midget Smith	PTS	12	May 2, 1921	23 years, 316 days	Madison Square Garden, New York City, New York, US	
101	Win	7–10–7 (77)	Benny Coster	PTS	15	Apr 26, 1921	23 years, 310 days	Pioneer Sporting Club, New York City, New York, US	
100	Loss	6–10–7 (77)	Midget Smith	SD	15	Apr 7, 1921	23 years, 291 days	Manhattan Casino, New York City, New York, US	
99	Draw	6–9–7 (77)	Midget Smith	PTS	10	Mar 21, 1921	23 years, 274 days	Madison Square Garden, New York City, New York, US	
98	Loss	6–9–6 (77)	Roy Moore	TKO	11 (15)	Dec 29, 1920	23 years, 192 days	Madison Square Garden, New York City, New York, US	
97	Loss	6–8–6 (77)	Joe Lynch	KO	15 (15), 0:43	Dec 2, 1920	23 years, 165 days	Madison Square Garden, New York City, New York, US	
96	Win	6–7–6 (77)	Charles Ledoux	PTS	15	Oct 15, 1920	23 years, 117 days	Madison Square Garden, New York City, New York, US	
95	Draw	5–7–6 (77)	Joe Burman	NWS	10	Oct 9, 1920	23 years, 111 days	East Chicago, Indiana, US	
94	Draw	5–7–6 (76)	Joe Lynch	PTS	15	Sep 28, 1920	23 years, 100 days	Madison Square Garden, New York City, New York, US	
93	Win	5–7–5 (76)	Pete Herman	NWS	10	Sep 11, 1920	23 years, 83 days	Oswego Arena, East Chicago, Indiana, US	
92	Draw	5–7–5 (75)	Terry Martin	PTS	12	Aug 3, 1920	23 years, 44 days	Armory, Boston, Massachusetts, US	
91	Loss	5–7–4 (75)	Frankie Burns	NWS	12	Jul 13, 1920	23 years, 23 days	Armory AA, Outdoor Arena, Jersey City, New Jersey, US	
90	Loss	5–7–4 (74)	Dick Loadman	NWS	10	Jun 1, 1920	22 years, 347 days	Auditorium, Milwaukee, Wisconsin, US	
89	Loss	5–7–4 (73)	Young Montreal	PTS	12	May 3, 1920	22 years, 318 days	Infantry Hall, Providence, Rhode Island, US	
88	Draw	5–6–4 (73)	Chip Davis	NWS	10	May 1, 1920	22 years, 316 days	Broadway Auditorium, Buffalo, New York, US	
87	Draw	5–6–4 (72)	Abe Friedman	PTS	12	Apr 27, 1920	22 years, 312 days	Armory, Boston, Massachusetts, US	
86	Win	5–6–3 (72)	Lew Angelo	NWS	8	Mar 22, 1920	22 years, 276 days	Grand Theatre, Trenton, New Jersey, US	
85	Win	5–6–3 (71)	Roy Moore	NWS	10	Mar 3, 1920	22 years, 257 days	Roller Palace Rink, Detroit, Michigan, US	
84	Win	5–6–3 (70)	Jimmy Conway	KO	1 (12)	Feb 26, 1920	22 years, 251 days	Crescent Rink, Lowell, Massachusetts, US	
83	Loss	4–6–3 (70)	Memphis Pal Moore	NWS	12	Feb 23, 1920	22 years, 248 days	Portland, Maine, US	
82	Win	4–6–3 (69)	William Vincent	NWS	10	Jan 21, 1920	22 years, 215 days	Detroit, Michigan, US	
81	Loss	4–6–3 (68)	Johnny Buff	NWS	8	Jan 15, 1920	22 years, 209 days	Grand View Auditorium, Jersey City, New Jersey, US	
80	Win	4–6–3 (67)	Patsy Wallace	NWS	6	Jan 5, 1920	22 years, 199 days	Olympia AC, Philadelphia, Pennsylvania, US	
79	Win	4–6–3 (66)	Marty Collins	NWS	10	Dec 29, 1919	22 years, 192 days	Grand Opera House, Syracuse, New York, US	
78	Win	4–6–3 (65)	Patsy Johnson	NWS	8	Dec 22, 1919	22 years, 185 days	1st Regiment Armory, Newark, New Jersey, US	
77	Win	4–6–3 (64)	Jimmy Wilde	NWS	10	Dec 6, 1919	22 years, 169 days	Auditorium, Milwaukee, Wisconsin, US	
76	Loss	4–6–3 (63)	Kid Regan	NWS	8	Oct 28, 1919	22 years, 130 days	Saint Louis, Missouri, US	
75	Win	4–6–3 (62)	Kid Regan	NWS	8	Oct 14, 1919	22 years, 116 days	Saint Louis, Missouri, US	
74	Win	4–6–3 (61)	Sammy Marino	NWS	10	Oct 10, 1919	22 years, 112 days	Auditorium, Milwaukee, Wisconsin, US	
73	Win	4–6–3 (60)	Pete Herman	NWS	10	Sep 15, 1919	22 years, 87 days	Roller Palace Rink, Detroit, Michigan, US	World bantamweight title at stake; (via KO only)
72	Win	4–6–3 (59)	William Vincent	NWS	10	Sep 1, 1919	22 years, 73 days	Detroit, Michigan, US	
71	Win	4–6–3 (58)	Pete Herman	NWS	10	Aug 15, 1919	22 years, 56 days	Auditorium, Milwaukee, Wisconsin, US	World bantamweight title at stake; (via KO only)
70	Win	4–6–3 (57)	Patsy Johnson	NWS	10	Jul 14, 1919	22 years, 24 days	Arena, Syracuse, New York, US	
69	Win	4–6–3 (56)	Joe Burman	NWS	10	Jun 16, 1919	21 years, 361 days	Auditorium, Milwaukee, Wisconsin, US	
68	Win	4–6–3 (55)	Memphis Pal Moore	NWS	10	Jun 4, 1919	21 years, 349 days	John Wagner's Arena, Racine, Wisconsin, US	
67	Win	4–6–3 (54)	Abe Friedman	NWS	6	May 19, 1919	21 years, 333 days	Olympia AC, Philadelphia, Pennsylvania, US	
66	Win	4–6–3 (53)	Frankie Mason	NWS	8	May 7, 1919	21 years, 321 days	Light Guard Armory, Detroit, Michigan, US	
65	Win	4–6–3 (52)	Chalky Wimler	NWS	6	Apr 14, 1919	21 years, 298 days	Duquesne Garden, Pittsburgh, Pennsylvania, US	
64	Loss	4–6–3 (51)	Jack 'Kid' Wolfe	NWS	10	Mar 24, 1919	21 years, 277 days	Grand Theater, Cleveland, Ohio, US	
63	Win	4–6–3 (50)	Patsy Johnson	NWS	8	Mar 19, 1919	21 years, 272 days	McGuigan's Arena, Harrison, New Jersey, US	
62	Loss	4–6–3 (49)	Patsy Johnson	NWS	?	Mar 10, 1919	21 years, 263 days	Harrison AC, Trenton, New Jersey, US	
61	Draw	4–6–3 (48)	Joe Burman	NWS	8	Jan 27, 1919	21 years, 221 days	Grand Theatre, Trenton, New Jersey, US	
60	Win	4–6–3 (47)	Young Eddie Wagond	NWS	6	Dec 21, 1918	21 years, 184 days	National AC, Philadelphia, Pennsylvania, US	
59	Draw	4–6–3 (46)	Dick Loadman	PTS	12	Dec 20, 1918	21 years, 183 days	Albaugh Theater, Baltimore, Maryland, US	
58	Win	4–6–2 (46)	Harold Farese	NWS	8	Dec 17, 1918	21 years, 180 days	Broad AC, Newark, New Jersey, US	
57	Loss	4–6–2 (45)	Patsy Johnson	NWS	8	Dec 16, 1918	21 years, 179 days	Trenton, New Jersey, US	
56	Loss	4–6–2 (44)	Harold Farese	NWS	8	Dec 9, 1918	21 years, 172 days	McGuigan's Arena, Harrison, New Jersey, US	
55	Win	4–6–2 (43)	Young Terry McGovern	NWS	6	Dec 6, 1918	21 years, 169 days	Cambria AC, Philadelphia, Pennsylvania, US	
54	Win	4–6–2 (42)	Eddie Wimler	NWS	6	Dec 2, 1918	21 years, 165 days	Olympia AC, Philadelphia, Pennsylvania, US	
53	Loss	4–6–2 (41)	Frankie Burns	NWS	6	Nov 16, 1918	21 years, 149 days	Madison Square Garden, New York City, New York, US	
52	Draw	4–6–2 (40)	Dick Loadman	NWS	10	Sep 17, 1918	21 years, 89 days	Bison Stadium, Buffalo, New York, US	
51	Loss	4–6–2 (39)	Pete Herman	NWS	6	Sep 2, 1918	21 years, 74 days	Olympia AC, Philadelphia, Pennsylvania, US	
50	Loss	4–6–2 (38)	Memphis Pal Moore	NWS	8	Aug 5, 1918	21 years, 46 days	Armory AA, Jersey City, New Jersey, US	
49	Win	4–6–2 (37)	Harvey Crosby	DQ	1 (8)	Jul 29, 1918	21 years, 39 days	Armory AA Outdoor Arena, Jersey City, New Jersey, US	
48	Loss	3–6–2 (37)	Harvey Crosby	NWS	8	Jul 4, 1918	21 years, 14 days	4th Regiment Armory, Jersey City, New Jersey, US	
47	Loss	3–6–2 (36)	Al Shubert	PTS	12	Jun 24, 1918	21 years, 4 days	New Bedford, Massachusetts, US	
46	Draw	3–5–2 (36)	Frankie Burns	NWS	6	Jun 20, 1918	21 years, 0 days	Madison Square Garden, New York City, New York, US	
45	Loss	3–5–2 (35)	Pete Herman	NWS	6	May 4, 1918	20 years, 318 days	National A.C., Philadelphia, Pennsylvania, US	
44	Win	3–5–2 (34)	Joe Tuber	NWS	6	Apr 6, 1918	20 years, 290 days	National A.C., Philadelphia, Pennsylvania, US	
43	Loss	3–5–2 (33)	Kid Williams	PTS	12	Apr 1, 1918	20 years, 285 days	Lyric Theater, Baltimore, Maryland, US	
42	Loss	3–4–2 (33)	Frankie Burns	NWS	10	Feb 21, 1918	20 years, 246 days	Town Hall, Scranton, Pennsylvania, US	
41	Loss	3–4–2 (32)	Memphis Pal Moore	PTS	10	Feb 18, 1918	20 years, 243 days	Lyric Theater, Baltimore, Maryland, US	
40	Draw	3–3–2 (32)	Joey Leonard	NWS	10	Jan 1, 1918	20 years, 195 days	Town Hall, Scranton, Pennsylvania, US	
39	Draw	3–3–2 (31)	Andy Chaney	PTS	15	Dec 26, 1917	20 years, 189 days	Albaugh Theater, Baltimore, Maryland, US	
38	Draw	3–3–1 (31)	Steve Flessner	PTS	10	Dec 12, 1917	20 years, 175 days	Albaugh Theater, Baltimore, Maryland, US	
37	Win	3–3 (31)	Freddie Haefling	NWS	10	Nov 26, 1917	20 years, 159 days	Coliseum A.C., Wilkes-Barre, Pennsylvania, US	
36	Loss	3–3 (30)	Memphis Pal Moore	NWS	10	Oct 30, 1917	20 years, 132 days	German Hall, Albany, New York, US	
35	Loss	3–3 (29)	Frankie Burns	NWS	10	Oct 15, 1917	20 years, 117 days	Auditorium, Albany, New York, US	
34	Loss	3–3 (28)	Memphis Pal Moore	NWS	10	Aug 20, 1917	20 years, 61 days	Convention Hall, Saratoga, New York, US	
33	Loss	3–3 (27)	Kid Williams	NWS	6	Jul 27, 1917	20 years, 37 days	Oriole Park, Baltimore, Maryland, US	
32	Loss	3–3 (26)	Joe Burman	NWS	10	Jun 19, 1917	19 years, 364 days	Pioneer SC, New York City, New York, US	
31	Draw	3–3 (25)	William Vincent	NWS	10	May 29, 1917	19 years, 343 days	National SC, Albany, New York, US	
30	Draw	3–3 (24)	William Vincent	NWS	10	May 15, 1917	19 years, 329 days	German Hall, Albany, New York, US	
29	Win	3–3 (23)	Frankie Daly	NWS	10	Apr 14, 1917	19 years, 298 days	Fairmont SC, New York City, New York, US	
28	Win	3–3 (22)	Johnny Solzberg	NWS	10	Apr 5, 1917	19 years, 289 days	Harlem SC, New York City, New York, US	
27	Loss	3–3 (21)	Joe Lynch	NWS	10	Feb 27, 1917	19 years, 252 days	Pioneer SC, New York City, New York, US	
26	Loss	3–3 (20)	Frankie Burns	NWS	10	Feb 9, 1917	19 years, 234 days	Harlem SC, New York City, New York, US	
25	Draw	3–3 (19)	Johnny Coulon	NWS	10	Feb 5, 1917	19 years, 230 days	Pioneer Sporting Club, New York City, New York, US	
24	Loss	3–3 (18)	Mickey Dunn	NWS	10	Jan 5, 1917	19 years, 199 days	Harlem SC, New York City, New York, US	
23	Win	3–3 (17)	Bobby Hubon	NWS	10	Jan 1, 1917	19 years, 195 days	Pioneer Sporting Club, New York City, New York, US	
22	Win	3–3 (16)	Gardner Brooks	NWS	10	Dec 12, 1916	19 years, 175 days	Hunter Point SC, New York City, New York, US	
21	Loss	3–3 (15)	Frankie Burns	NWS	10	Nov 27, 1916	19 years, 160 days	Pioneer SC, New York City, New York, US	
20	Loss	3–3 (14)	Memphis Pal Moore	NWS	10	Nov 25, 1916	19 years, 158 days	Fairmont AC, New York City, New York, US	
19	Win	3–3 (13)	Bobby Hubon	NWS	10	Nov 14, 1916	19 years, 147 days	Pioneer Sporting Club, New York City, New York, US	
18	Loss	3–3 (12)	Frankie Britt	NWS	10	Nov 10, 1916	19 years, 143 days	Marieville Gardens, North Providence, Rhode Island, US	
17	Loss	3–3 (11)	Joe Lynch	NWS	10	Sep 26, 1916	19 years, 98 days	Pioneer Sporting Club, New York City, New York, US	
16	Loss	3–3 (10)	Young Zulu Kid	KO	5 (?)	Jun 2, 1916	18 years, 348 days	Vanderbilt AC, New York City, New York, US	
15	Win	3–2 (10)	Jack Sayles	NWS	10	May 24, 1916	18 years, 339 days	Stadium AC, New York City, New York, US	
14	Win	3–2 (9)	Johnny Taylor	NWS	10	May 12, 1916	18 years, 327 days	Brown's Gym AA, New York City, New York, US	
13	Loss	3–2 (8)	Freddie Haefling	NWS	10	Mar 27, 1916	18 years, 281 days	Majestic Theatre, Wilkes-Barre, Pennsylvania, US	
12	Win	3–2 (7)	Johnny Fisse	NWS	10	Mar 25, 1916	18 years, 279 days	Fairmont AC, New York City, New York, US	
11	Win	3–2 (6)	Abe Friedman	NWS	10	Feb 28, 1916	18 years, 253 days	Majestic Theatre, Wilkes-Barre, Pennsylvania, US	
10	Loss	3–2 (5)	Abe Friedman	NWS	10	Feb 21, 1916	18 years, 246 days	Olympia Boxing Club, New York City, New York, US	
9	Win	3–2 (4)	Freddie Haefling	PTS	10	Jan 28, 1916	18 years, 222 days	Majestic Theater, Waterbury, Connecticut, US	
8	Win	2–2 (4)	Eddie Gorman	DQ	2 (6)	Jan 17, 1916	18 years, 211 days	Broadway Arena, New York City, New York, US	
7	Loss	1–2 (4)	Johnny Eggers	KO	3	Jan 14, 1916	18 years, 208 days	Vanderbilt AC, New York City, New York, US	
6	Loss	1–1 (4)	Teddy Jacobs	NWS	10	Nov 12, 1915	18 years, 145 days	Long Acre AA, New York City, New York, US	
5	Loss	1–1 (3)	Jack Diamond	TKO	2 (?)	Mar 16, 1915	17 years, 269 days	Brown's Gym AA, New York City, New York, US	
4	Draw	1–0 (3)	Young Benny	NWS	10	Jan 16, 1915	17 years, 210 days	Brown's Gym, New York City, New York, US	
3	Win	1–0 (2)	Buddy Faulkes	PTS	12	Nov 26, 1914	17 years, 159 days	Hanna Armory, New Britain, Connecticut, US	
2	Loss	0–0 (2)	Frankie Daly	NWS	10	Oct 5, 1914	17 years, 107 days	Olympic AC, New York City, New York, US	
1	Loss	0–0 (1)	Percy Young Aubrey	NWS	10	May 23, 1914	16 years, 337 days	Brown's Gym AA, New York City, New York, US	

=== Unofficial record ===
148 fights	59 wins	64 losses
By knockout	2	9
By decision	55	54
By disqualification	2	1
Draws	23	
No contests	2	

Record with the inclusion of newspaper decisions in the win/loss/draw column.

No.	Result	Record	Opponent	Type	Round	Date	Age	Location	Notes
148	Loss	59–64–23 (2)	Young Mulligan	PTS	10	May 25, 1926	28 years, 339 days	Armory, Norwalk, New Jersey, US	
147	Win	59–63–23 (2)	Georgie Sanders	PTS	8	Feb 22, 1926	28 years, 247 days	Hot Springs, Arkansas, US	
146	Loss	58–63–23 (2)	Giovanni Salerno	NWS	10	Nov 6, 1925	28 years, 139 days	Floral Park Arena, North Bergen, New Jersey, US	
145	Loss	58–62–23 (2)	Red Chapman	TKO	3 (10)	Oct 23, 1925	28 years, 125 days	Lawrence, Massachusetts, US	
144	Loss	58–61–23 (2)	Johnny Kochansky	NWS	10	Sep 8, 1925	28 years, 80 days	Jersey City, New Jersey, US	
143	ND	58–60–23 (2)	Petey Mack	ND	12	Aug 3, 1925	28 years, 44 days	Jersey City, New Jersey, US	
142	Loss	58–60–23 (1)	Harry London	TKO	4 (10)	Aug 1, 1925	28 years, 42 days	Hollywood Baseball Park, Long Branch, New Jersey, US	Sharkey fell out of the ring and could not continue
141	Win	58–59–23 (1)	Midget Mike Moran	NWS	10	Jul 24, 1925	28 years, 34 days	Bayonne, Louisiana, US	
140	NC	57–59–23 (1)	Pete Sarmiento	NC	3 (12)	Jul 16, 1925	28 years, 26 days	Dexter Park Stadium, New Jersey, US	Rain came down so hard the canvas became water-soaked and slippery and the bout had to be stopped
139	Win	57–59–23	Johnny Curtin	NWS	12	Jul 6, 1925	28 years, 16 days	Oakland AA, Jersey City, New Jersey, US	
138	Draw	56–59–23	Joe Lynch	PTS	4	Jul 2, 1925	28 years, 12 days	Polo Grounds, New York City, New York, US	
137	Loss	56–59–22	Frankie Fasano	PTS	10	May 13, 1925	27 years, 327 days	Manhattan Casino, New York City, New York, US	
136	Win	56–58–22	Harry London	PTS	10	Apr 29, 1925	27 years, 313 days	Manhattan Casino, New York City, New York, US	
135	Win	55–58–22	Willie Tucker	KO	1 (?)	Apr 23, 1925	27 years, 307 days	Columbus Hall, Yonkers, New York, US	
134	Loss	54–58–22	Eddie Bowen	NWS	10	Apr 1, 1925	27 years, 285 days	Barracks, Washington, DC, US	
133	Loss	54–57–22	Frankie Fasano	DQ	2 (?)	Dec 2, 1924	27 years, 165 days	Pioneer Sporting Club, New York City, New York, US	Sharkey claimed a foul, but the referee disagreed. Sharkey attacked him and was DQ'd.
132	Win	53–57–22	Willie Duffy	PTS	10	Nov 13, 1924	27 years, 146 days	Columbus Hall, Yonkers, New York, US	
131	Loss	52–57–22	Izzy Cooper	PTS	6	Oct 27, 1924	27 years, 129 days	Broadway Arena, New York City, New York, US	
130	Win	52–56–22	Jack Dalton	PTS	8	Mar 13, 1924	26 years, 267 days	Shreveport, Louisiana, US	
129	Loss	51–56–22	Eddie McKenna	TKO	8 (15)	Feb 18, 1924	26 years, 243 days	Coliseum Arena, New Orleans, Louisiana, US	
128	Loss	51–55–22	Jack Lockhart	KO	1 (4)	Sep 26, 1923	26 years, 98 days	Arena, Seattle, Washington, US	
127	Loss	51–54–22	George Marks	PTS	4	Sep 18, 1923	26 years, 90 days	Arena, Vernon, California, US	
126	Loss	51–53–22	Peter Zivic	PTS	12	Jun 19, 1923	25 years, 364 days	Queensboro Stadium, New York City, New York, US	
125	Win	51–52–22	Mickey Brown	PTS	12	Jun 8, 1923	25 years, 353 days	Rink SC, New York City, New York, US	
124	Loss	50–52–22	Johnny Curtin	PTS	8	Jun 2, 1923	25 years, 347 days	Polo Grounds, New York City, New York, US	
123	Loss	50–51–22	Charlie Beecher	PTS	8	Apr 23, 1923	25 years, 307 days	Coliseum, Chicago, Illinois, US	
122	Loss	50–50–22	Johnny Curtin	NWS	12	Jan 8, 1923	25 years, 202 days	4th Regiment Armory, Jersey City, New Jersey, US	
121	Loss	50–49–22	Tommy Gerrard	NWS	12	Jan 1, 1923	25 years, 195 days	Arena, Trenton, New Jersey, US	
120	Loss	50–48–22	Sammy Sieger	PTS	12	Jul 29, 1922	25 years, 39 days	Queensboro Stadium, New York City, New York, US	
119	Loss	50–47–22	Johnny Dundee	UD	15	Jul 6, 1922	25 years, 16 days	Ebbets Field, New York City, New York, US	For NYSAC super featherweight title
118	Win	50–46–22	Jack Hausner	PTS	12	Jun 2, 1922	24 years, 347 days	Palace of Joy, New York City, New York, US	
117	Draw	49–46–22	Vincent 'Pepper' Martin	PTS	12	May 20, 1922	24 years, 334 days	Ebbets Field, New York City, New York, US	
116	Win	49–46–21	Roy Moore	PTS	12	May 9, 1922	24 years, 323 days	Pioneer Sporting Club, New York City, New York, US	
115	Win	48–46–21	Harry London	PTS	12	Apr 29, 1922	24 years, 313 days	Commonwealth Sporting Club, New York City, New York, US	
114	Win	47–46–21	Joe O'Donnell	NWS	8	Apr 20, 1922	24 years, 304 days	Ice Palace, Philadelphia, Pennsylvania, US	
113	Win	46–46–21	Sammy Nable	PTS	12	Apr 11, 1922	24 years, 295 days	Pioneer Sporting Club, New York City, New York, US	
112	Win	45–46–21	Willie Spencer	PTS	12	Mar 28, 1922	24 years, 281 days	Pioneer Sporting Club, New York City, New York, US	
111	Loss	44–46–21	Johnny Brown	NWS	10	Mar 17, 1922	N/A	Philadelphia, Pennsylvania, US	Exact date and venue unknown
110	Win	44–45–21	Earl McArthur	NWS	10	Feb 27, 1922	24 years, 252 days	Edgewater Garden, Sioux City, Iowa, US	
109	Loss	43–45–21	Johnny Buff	PTS	15	Nov 10, 1921	24 years, 143 days	Madison Square Garden, New York City, New York, US	For NYSAC and NBA bantamweight titles
108	Loss	43–44–21	William Vincent	PTS	8	Oct 7, 1921	24 years, 109 days	Madison Square Garden, New York City, New York, US	
107	Draw	43–43–21	Sammy Nable	PTS	12	Sep 26, 1921	24 years, 98 days	Broadway Arena, New York City, New York, US	
106	Win	43–43–20	Roy Moore	NWS	10	Sep 9, 1921	24 years, 81 days	Twin Cities AC, East Chicago, Indiana, US	
105	Draw	42–43–20	Cowboy Eddie Anderson	PTS	12	Aug 26, 1921	24 years, 67 days	Palace of Joy, New York City, New York, US	
104	Draw	42–43–19	Joe Burman	PTS	10	Jun 21, 1921	24 years, 1 day	Boxing Drome, New York City, New York, US	
103	Draw	42–43–18	Willie Spencer	PTS	12	Jun 10, 1921	23 years, 355 days	Palace of Joy, New York City, New York, US	
102	Win	42–43–17	Midget Smith	PTS	12	May 2, 1921	23 years, 316 days	Madison Square Garden, New York City, New York, US	
101	Win	41–43–17	Benny Coster	PTS	15	Apr 26, 1921	23 years, 310 days	Pioneer Sporting Club, New York City, New York, US	
100	Loss	40–43–17	Midget Smith	SD	15	Apr 7, 1921	23 years, 291 days	Manhattan Casino, New York City, New York, US	
99	Draw	40–42–17	Midget Smith	PTS	10	Mar 21, 1921	23 years, 274 days	Madison Square Garden, New York City, New York, US	
98	Loss	40–42–16	Roy Moore	TKO	11 (15)	Dec 29, 1920	23 years, 192 days	Madison Square Garden, New York City, New York, US	
97	Loss	40–41–16	Joe Lynch	KO	15 (15), 0:43	Dec 2, 1920	23 years, 165 days	Madison Square Garden, New York City, New York, US	
96	Win	40–40–16	Charles Ledoux	PTS	15	Oct 15, 1920	23 years, 117 days	Madison Square Garden, New York City, New York, US	
95	Draw	39–40–16	Joe Burman	NWS	10	Oct 9, 1920	23 years, 111 days	East Chicago, Indiana, US	
94	Draw	39–40–15	Joe Lynch	PTS	15	Sep 28, 1920	23 years, 100 days	Madison Square Garden, New York City, New York, US	
93	Win	39–40–14	Pete Herman	NWS	10	Sep 11, 1920	23 years, 83 days	Oswego Arena, East Chicago, Indiana, US	
92	Draw	38–40–14	Terry Martin	PTS	12	Aug 3, 1920	23 years, 44 days	Armory, Boston, Massachusetts, US	
91	Loss	38–40–13	Frankie Burns	NWS	12	Jul 13, 1920	23 years, 23 days	Armory AA, Outdoor Arena, Jersey City, New Jersey, US	
90	Loss	38–39–13	Dick Loadman	NWS	10	Jun 1, 1920	22 years, 347 days	Auditorium, Milwaukee, Wisconsin, US	
89	Loss	38–38–13	Young Montreal	PTS	12	May 3, 1920	22 years, 318 days	Infantry Hall, Providence, Rhode Island, US	
88	Draw	38–37–13	Chip Davis	NWS	10	May 1, 1920	22 years, 316 days	Broadway Auditorium, Buffalo, New York, US	
87	Draw	38–37–12	Abe Friedman	PTS	12	Apr 27, 1920	22 years, 312 days	Armory, Boston, Massachusetts, US	
86	Win	38–37–11	Lew Angelo	NWS	8	Mar 22, 1920	22 years, 276 days	Grand Theatre, Trenton, New Jersey, US	
85	Win	37–37–11	Roy Moore	NWS	10	Mar 3, 1920	22 years, 257 days	Roller Palace Rink, Detroit, Michigan, US	
84	Win	36–37–11	Jimmy Conway	KO	1 (12)	Feb 26, 1920	22 years, 251 days	Crescent Rink, Lowell, Massachusetts, US	
83	Loss	35–37–11	Memphis Pal Moore	NWS	12	Feb 23, 1920	22 years, 248 days	Portland, Maine, US	
82	Win	35–36–11	William Vincent	NWS	10	Jan 21, 1920	22 years, 215 days	Detroit, Michigan, US	
81	Loss	34–36–11	Johnny Buff	NWS	8	Jan 15, 1920	22 years, 209 days	Grand View Auditorium, Jersey City, New Jersey, US	
80	Win	34–35–11	Patsy Wallace	NWS	6	Jan 5, 1920	22 years, 199 days	Olympia AC, Philadelphia, Pennsylvania, US	
79	Win	33–35–11	Marty Collins	NWS	10	Dec 29, 1919	22 years, 192 days	Grand Opera House, Syracuse, New York, US	
78	Win	32–35–11	Patsy Johnson	NWS	8	Dec 22, 1919	22 years, 185 days	1st Regiment Armory, Newark, New Jersey, US	
77	Win	31–35–11	Jimmy Wilde	NWS	10	Dec 6, 1919	22 years, 169 days	Auditorium, Milwaukee, Wisconsin, US	
76	Loss	30–35–11	Kid Regan	NWS	8	Oct 28, 1919	22 years, 130 days	Saint Louis, Missouri, US	
75	Win	30–34–11	Kid Regan	NWS	8	Oct 14, 1919	22 years, 116 days	Saint Louis, Missouri, US	
74	Win	29–34–11	Sammy Marino	NWS	10	Oct 10, 1919	22 years, 112 days	Auditorium, Milwaukee, Wisconsin, US	
73	Win	28–34–11	Pete Herman	NWS	10	Sep 15, 1919	22 years, 87 days	Roller Palace Rink, Detroit, Michigan, US	World bantamweight title at stake; (via KO only)
72	Win	27–34–11	William Vincent	NWS	10	Sep 1, 1919	22 years, 73 days	Detroit, Michigan, US	
71	Win	26–34–11	Pete Herman	NWS	10	Aug 15, 1919	22 years, 56 days	Auditorium, Milwaukee, Wisconsin, US	World bantamweight title at stake; (via KO only)
70	Win	25–34–11	Patsy Johnson	NWS	10	Jul 14, 1919	22 years, 24 days	Arena, Syracuse, New York, US	
69	Win	24–34–11	Joe Burman	NWS	10	Jun 16, 1919	21 years, 361 days	Auditorium, Milwaukee, Wisconsin, US	
68	Win	23–34–11	Memphis Pal Moore	NWS	10	Jun 4, 1919	21 years, 349 days	John Wagner's Arena, Racine, Wisconsin, US	
67	Win	22–34–11	Abe Friedman	NWS	6	May 19, 1919	21 years, 333 days	Olympia AC, Philadelphia, Pennsylvania, US	
66	Win	21–34–11	Frankie Mason	NWS	8	May 7, 1919	21 years, 321 days	Light Guard Armory, Detroit, Michigan, US	
65	Win	20–34–11	Chalky Wimler	NWS	6	Apr 14, 1919	21 years, 298 days	Duquesne Garden, Pittsburgh, Pennsylvania, US	
64	Loss	19–34–11	Jack 'Kid' Wolfe	NWS	10	Mar 24, 1919	21 years, 277 days	Grand Theater, Cleveland, Ohio, US	
63	Win	19–33–11	Patsy Johnson	NWS	8	Mar 19, 1919	21 years, 272 days	McGuigan's Arena, Harrison, New Jersey, US	
62	Loss	18–33–11	Patsy Johnson	NWS	?	Mar 10, 1919	21 years, 263 days	Harrison AC, Trenton, New Jersey, US	
61	Draw	18–32–11	Joe Burman	NWS	8	Jan 27, 1919	21 years, 221 days	Grand Theatre, Trenton, New Jersey, US	
60	Win	18–32–10	Young Eddie Wagond	NWS	6	Dec 21, 1918	21 years, 184 days	National AC, Philadelphia, Pennsylvania, US	
59	Draw	17–32–10	Dick Loadman	PTS	12	Dec 20, 1918	21 years, 183 days	Albaugh Theater, Baltimore, Maryland, US	
58	Win	17–32–9	Harold Farese	NWS	8	Dec 17, 1918	21 years, 180 days	Broad AC, Newark, New Jersey, US	
57	Loss	16–32–9	Patsy Johnson	NWS	8	Dec 16, 1918	21 years, 179 days	Trenton, New Jersey, US	
56	Loss	16–31–9	Harold Farese	NWS	8	Dec 9, 1918	21 years, 172 days	McGuigan's Arena, Harrison, New Jersey, US	
55	Win	16–30–9	Young Terry McGovern	NWS	6	Dec 6, 1918	21 years, 169 days	Cambria AC, Philadelphia, Pennsylvania, US	
54	Win	15–30–9	Eddie Wimler	NWS	6	Dec 2, 1918	21 years, 165 days	Olympia AC, Philadelphia, Pennsylvania, US	
53	Loss	14–30–9	Frankie Burns	NWS	6	Nov 16, 1918	21 years, 149 days	Madison Square Garden, New York City, New York, US	
52	Draw	14–29–9	Dick Loadman	NWS	10	Sep 17, 1918	21 years, 89 days	Bison Stadium, Buffalo, New York, US	
51	Loss	14–29–8	Pete Herman	NWS	6	Sep 2, 1918	21 years, 74 days	Olympia AC, Philadelphia, Pennsylvania, US	
50	Loss	14–28–8	Memphis Pal Moore	NWS	8	Aug 5, 1918	21 years, 46 days	Armory AA, Jersey City, New Jersey, US	
49	Win	14–27–8	Harvey Crosby	DQ	1 (8)	Jul 29, 1918	21 years, 39 days	Armory AA Outdoor Arena, Jersey City, New Jersey, US	
48	Loss	13–27–8	Harvey Crosby	NWS	8	Jul 4, 1918	21 years, 14 days	4th Regiment Armory, Jersey City, New Jersey, US	
47	Loss	13–26–8	Al Shubert	PTS	12	Jun 24, 1918	21 years, 4 days	New Bedford, Massachusetts, US	
46	Draw	13–25–8	Frankie Burns	NWS	6	Jun 20, 1918	21 years, 0 days	Madison Square Garden, New York City, New York, US	
45	Loss	13–25–7	Pete Herman	NWS	6	May 4, 1918	20 years, 318 days	National A.C., Philadelphia, Pennsylvania, US	
44	Win	13–24–7	Joe Tuber	NWS	6	Apr 6, 1918	20 years, 290 days	National A.C., Philadelphia, Pennsylvania, US	
43	Loss	12–24–7	Kid Williams	PTS	12	Apr 1, 1918	20 years, 285 days	Lyric Theater, Baltimore, Maryland, US	
42	Loss	12–23–7	Frankie Burns	NWS	10	Feb 21, 1918	20 years, 246 days	Town Hall, Scranton, Pennsylvania, US	
41	Loss	12–22–7	Memphis Pal Moore	PTS	10	Feb 18, 1918	20 years, 243 days	Lyric Theater, Baltimore, Maryland, US	
40	Draw	12–21–7	Joey Leonard	NWS	10	Jan 1, 1918	20 years, 195 days	Town Hall, Scranton, Pennsylvania, US	
39	Draw	12–21–6	Andy Chaney	PTS	15	Dec 26, 1917	20 years, 189 days	Albaugh Theater, Baltimore, Maryland, US	
38	Draw	12–21–5	Steve Flessner	PTS	10	Dec 12, 1917	20 years, 175 days	Albaugh Theater, Baltimore, Maryland, US	
37	Win	12–21–4	Freddie Haefling	NWS	10	Nov 26, 1917	20 years, 159 days	Coliseum A.C., Wilkes-Barre, Pennsylvania, US	
36	Loss	12–20–4	Memphis Pal Moore	NWS	10	Oct 30, 1917	20 years, 132 days	German Hall, Albany, New York, US	
35	Loss	12–19–4	Frankie Burns	NWS	10	Oct 15, 1917	20 years, 117 days	Auditorium, Albany, New York, US	
34	Loss	12–18–4	Memphis Pal Moore	NWS	10	Aug 20, 1917	20 years, 61 days	Convention Hall, Saratoga, New York, US	
33	Loss	12–17–4	Kid Williams	NWS	6	Jul 27, 1917	20 years, 37 days	Oriole Park, Baltimore, Maryland, US	
32	Loss	12–16–4	Joe Burman	NWS	10	Jun 19, 1917	19 years, 364 days	Pioneer SC, New York City, New York, US	
31	Draw	12–15–4	William Vincent	NWS	10	May 29, 1917	19 years, 343 days	National SC, Albany, New York, US	
30	Draw	12–15–3	William Vincent	NWS	10	May 15, 1917	19 years, 329 days	German Hall, Albany, New York, US	
29	Win	12–15–2	Frankie Daly	NWS	10	Apr 14, 1917	19 years, 298 days	Fairmont SC, New York City, New York, US	
28	Win	11–15–2	Johnny Solzberg	NWS	10	Apr 5, 1917	19 years, 289 days	Harlem SC, New York City, New York, US	
27	Loss	10–15–2	Joe Lynch	NWS	10	Feb 27, 1917	19 years, 252 days	Pioneer SC, New York City, New York, US	
26	Loss	10–14–2	Frankie Burns	NWS	10	Feb 9, 1917	19 years, 234 days	Harlem SC, New York City, New York, US	
25	Draw	10–13–2	Johnny Coulon	NWS	10	Feb 5, 1917	19 years, 230 days	Pioneer Sporting Club, New York City, New York, US	
24	Loss	10–13–1	Mickey Dunn	NWS	10	Jan 5, 1917	19 years, 199 days	Harlem SC, New York City, New York, US	
23	Win	10–12–1	Bobby Hubon	NWS	10	Jan 1, 1917	19 years, 195 days	Pioneer Sporting Club, New York City, New York, US	
22	Win	9–12–1	Gardner Brooks	NWS	10	Dec 12, 1916	19 years, 175 days	Hunter Point SC, New York City, New York, US	
21	Loss	8–12–1	Frankie Burns	NWS	10	Nov 27, 1916	19 years, 160 days	Pioneer SC, New York City, New York, US	
20	Loss	8–11–1	Memphis Pal Moore	NWS	10	Nov 25, 1916	19 years, 158 days	Fairmont AC, New York City, New York, US	
19	Win	8–10–1	Bobby Hubon	NWS	10	Nov 14, 1916	19 years, 147 days	Pioneer Sporting Club, New York City, New York, US	
18	Loss	7–10–1	Frankie Britt	NWS	10	Nov 10, 1916	19 years, 143 days	Marieville Gardens, North Providence, Rhode Island, US	
17	Loss	7–9–1	Joe Lynch	NWS	10	Sep 26, 1916	19 years, 98 days	Pioneer Sporting Club, New York City, New York, US	
16	Loss	7–8–1	Young Zulu Kid	KO	5 (?)	Jun 2, 1916	18 years, 348 days	Vanderbilt AC, New York City, New York, US	
15	Win	7–7–1	Jack Sayles	NWS	10	May 24, 1916	18 years, 339 days	Stadium AC, New York City, New York, US	
14	Win	6–7–1	Johnny Taylor	NWS	10	May 12, 1916	18 years, 327 days	Brown's Gym AA, New York City, New York, US	
13	Loss	5–7–1	Freddie Haefling	NWS	10	Mar 27, 1916	18 years, 281 days	Majestic Theatre, Wilkes-Barre, Pennsylvania, US	
12	Win	5–6–1	Johnny Fisse	NWS	10	Mar 25, 1916	18 years, 279 days	Fairmont AC, New York City, New York, US	
11	Win	4–6–1	Abe Friedman	NWS	10	Feb 28, 1916	18 years, 253 days	Majestic Theatre, Wilkes-Barre, Pennsylvania, US	
10	Loss	3–6–1	Abe Friedman	NWS	10	Feb 21, 1916	18 years, 246 days	Olympia Boxing Club, New York City, New York, US	
9	Win	3–5–1	Freddie Haefling	PTS	10	Jan 28, 1916	18 years, 222 days	Majestic Theater, Waterbury, Connecticut, US	
8	Win	2–5–1	Eddie Gorman	DQ	2 (6)	Jan 17, 1916	18 years, 211 days	Broadway Arena, New York City, New York, US	
7	Loss	1–5–1	Johnny Eggers	KO	3	Jan 14, 1916	18 years, 208 days	Vanderbilt AC, New York City, New York, US	
6	Loss	1–4–1	Teddy Jacobs	NWS	10	Nov 12, 1915	18 years, 145 days	Long Acre AA, New York City, New York, US	
5	Loss	1–3–1	Jack Diamond	TKO	2 (?)	Mar 16, 1915	17 years, 269 days	Brown's Gym AA, New York City, New York, US	
4	Draw	1–2–1	Young Benny	NWS	10	Jan 16, 1915	17 years, 210 days	Brown's Gym, New York City, New York, US	
3	Win	1–2	Buddy Faulkes	PTS	12	Nov 26, 1914	17 years, 159 days	Hanna Armory, New Britain, Connecticut, US	
2	Loss	0–2	Frankie Daly	NWS	10	Oct 5, 1914	17 years, 107 days	Olympic AC, New York City, New York, US	
1	Loss	0–1	Percy Young Aubrey	NWS	10	May 23, 1914	16 years, 337 days	Brown's Gym AA, New York City, New York, US	
