= Frankie Burns =

American boxer (1889–1961)

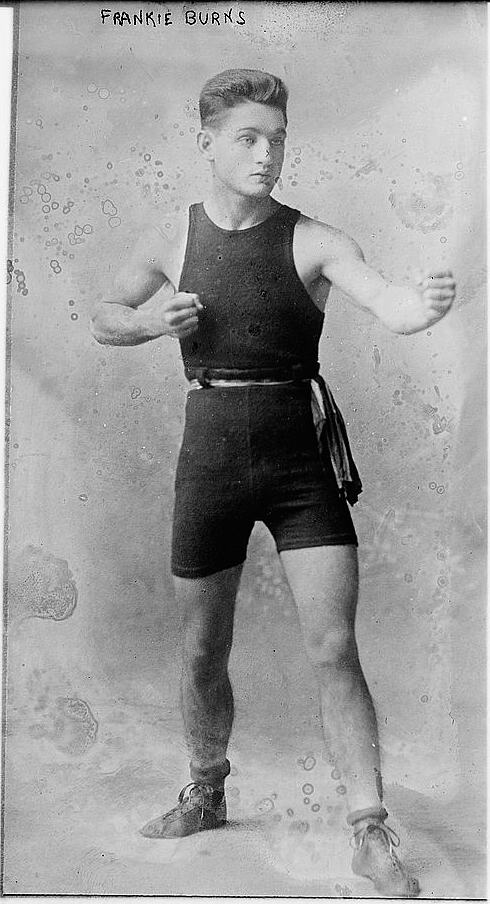
- Frankie Burns

Personal information
- Nickname: "Jersey" Frankie Burns
- Nationality: American
- Born: Frankie Burns; June 24, 1889 Jersey City, New Jersey
- Died: April 10, 1961 (aged 71) Jersey City, New Jersey
- Height: 5 ft 4.5 in (1.64 m)
- Weight: Bantamweight

Boxing career
- Reach: 67.5 in (171 cm)
- Stance: Orthodox

Boxing record
- Total fights: 187 (Includes Newspaper Decisions)
- Wins: 139
- Win by KO: 29
- Losses: 24
- Draws: 24

Frankie Burns (June 24, 1889 – April 10, 1961) was a top rated American bantamweight boxer from New Jersey who contended four times for the World Bantamweight Championship between 1912 and 1917, twice meeting Johnny Coulon. Founder of Ring Magazine, Nat Fleischer ranked Burns as the #8 All-Time Bantamweight.

== Early life and professional career ==
Burns began boxing professionally in 1908. Between March 1908 and March 1920, fighting primarily in the New York area, Burns won twelve and lost six of twenty bouts partly during New York's no decision era. His record was impressive, if not stellar, though his competition was talented. On September 26, 1908, he knocked out "Buffalo" Eddie Kelly, a strong puncher who would go on to challenge Abe Attell twice that year for the World Featherweight Championship.

On February 15, 1910, Burns defeated Jewish boxer Charley Goldman for the first time in a ten-round decision of the Boston Globe at New York City's Brown's Gym. He defeated Goldman again on December 27, 1910, at the Armory in Rochester, New York in a six-round newspaper decision of the New York Times. Goldman did some great infighting in the second round but Burns dominated in the other five rounds. Goldman would go on to become one of America's greatest boxing trainers with Rocky Marciano as his best known trainee.

On March 31, 1911, Burns lost to the great ex-Featherweight champion Abe Attell at New York's New Amsterdam Opera House in a ten-round newspaper decision in what was likely a no-decision bout. Burns was down in the ninth and tenth rounds, and most New York newspapers gave the bout to Attell.

On October 23, 1911, Burns defeated Monte Attell in a non-title ten-round newspaper decision of New Orleans' Daily Times-Picayune. Monte Attell, brother of Abe, had formerly held the World Bantamweight title from 1909 to 1910. New Orleans' Times-Democrat gave six of the ten rounds to Burns who they believed deserved the decision in the fairly close bout. The Democrat gave only the fourth clearly to Attell, who slipped in the tenth and was very briefly down. The Democrat called the fifth, sixth, and eighth rounds even. The bout was an important showing for Burns, and helped him secure a title bout with Coulon the following year.

== Boxing Johnny Coulon, World Bantamweight Championship, February 1912 ==
On February 18, 1912, Burns first challenged Johnny Coulon for the World Bantamweight Championship at the Westside Athletic Club in Gretna, Louisiana, losing in a twenty-round points decision. The Scranton Republican wrote that Coulon "was met with such an onslaught ... that a number of Burns's supporters thought he should have at least had a draw." There was only one knockdown in the close bout which came in the first minute of the last round by Coulon, which may have sealed his victory. Burns dropped from a left hook to the jaw but was up in an instant and fighting hard.

=== Second World Bantamweight Title Match, Johnny Coulon, June 1913 ===
On June 23, 1913, Burns would again meet Coulon for the World Bantamweight Championship at Kenosha, Wisconsin, in a no decision bout, which ended in a ten-round draw. Coulon would have forfeited the championship if he had suffered a knockout. The Los Angeles Times wrote that Burns might have won the fight, if Coulon had not held him off in close clinches. The Times wrote, "If it had not been for the holding on tactics of the champion (Coulon), the result might have been different. Burns was willing to fight at all times but Johnny held him continuously and especially when forced into close quarters."

=== Bouts with "Memphis" Pal Moore ===
Burns would have four of the best fights of his career against the great Memphis Pal Moore. The first two fights Burns won by ten-round decision on February 5, 1916, and January 1, 1917, in New York. In their January 1, fight, the Reno Gazette-Journal noted that Burns won five of the ten rounds, with Moore winning three by a shade and two even. The third fight Burns won on a foul at the Arena in Boston, Massachusetts on July 24, 1917, BoxRec lists the bout as a draw. One source considered Burns the aggressor in their Boston fight in all but four of the rounds. The fourth fight Burns won again in an eighth-round decision in Jersey City, New Jersey on August 2, 1918.

On October 13, 1914, in his only meeting with Jewish boxer Willie Jackson of the Bronx, Burns won by newspaper decision of the New York Times at Browns Gym in New York City in a ten-round bout.

=== Third World Bantamweight Title Match, Kid Williams, December 1915 ===
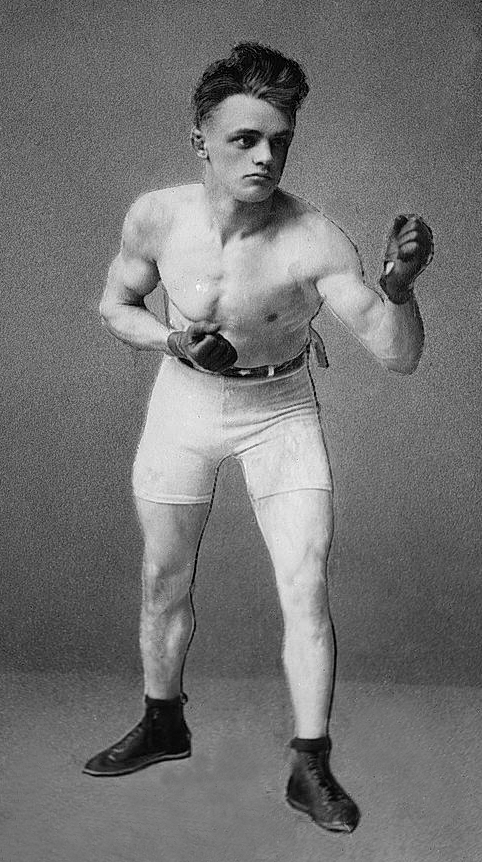
Kid Williams

On December 6, 1915, Burns met Kid Williams in a World Bantamweight Title match at the Tulane Arena in New Orleans, Louisiana, drawing in a twenty-round points decision. For the first eight rounds, Burns appeared to have the advantage, at both long range and infighting, but the tide of the fight appeared to turn by the ninth. From the ninth to the twentieth, Williams seemed to carry the fight, eventually getting the draw ruling. In the close bout one source gave Burns the first six rounds, as well as the eighth and the seventeenth, with the tenth, eleventh, sixteenth, and eighteenth even. From the eighth to the nineteenth, "Burns seemed to exercise better ring generalship, and boxed cleverly. But Williams was strong on the infighting, landing frequent uppercuts and pounding Burns' ribs until his body was red." By the ninth round, Burns seemed to tire, though the fighting was fast and furious throughout, and the crowd was pleased with the amount of action.

On December 19, 1916, Burns defeated Joe Lynch at the Pioneer Sporting Club in New York City in a ten-round newspaper decision of the New York World, and New York Sun. Lynch would take the World Bantamweight Championship in 1920.

On February 22, 1917, Burns defeated Italian boxer Young Zulu Kid, at the Pioneer Sporting Club in New York City in a fourth-round TKO. The Zulu Kid had been knocked down several times. Young Zulu Kid was an Italian boxer who had recently contended for the World Flyweight Title in London against Jimmy Wilde. In something of a poor match, Burns had nearly a five-inch advantage in height and reach.

Between November 1916, and July 1920, Burns met talented bantamweight contender "Little" Jackie Sharkey seven times, defeating him in each meeting according to most newspapers, though Burns was eight years younger and skilled enough to claim the World Bantamweight Championship in August 1919.

=== Last attempt at World Bantamweight Title, Pete Herman, November 1917 ===
Pete Herman

In his last attempt at the World Bantamweight Title, Burns fought Pete Herman, on November 5, 1917, before around 10,000 fans, losing in a twenty-round points decision at the Louisiana Auditorium in New Orleans. Burns was said to have made a poor start and fought at a disadvantage for the first three rounds, being staggered in the second. He came back and won the fourth, but fought at a slight disadvantage during most of the remaining rounds.

On February 13, 1920, Burns knocked out talented Jewish boxer Benny Kaufman in the sixth of eight rounds in Jersey City, New Jersey.

On the undercard of Jack Dempsey vs. Georges Carpentier, Burns defeated Packey O'Gatty by eight-round decision on July 2, 1921, at Jersey City, New Jersey.

Burns was elected to the New Jersey Boxing Hall of Fame in its inaugural class in 1969.

== Death at 71 ==
Burns died on April 10, 1961, at his home in Jersey City, New Jersey after a long illness. Funeral services were held on April 13.
