= Joe Burman =

American boxer (1898–1979)

Personal information
- Nationality: American
- Born: Joseph Burman; 11 December 1898 London, England
- Died: 8 April 1979 (aged 80) Los Angeles, California
- Height: 5 ft 4 in (1.63 m)
- Weight: Bantamweight

Boxing career
- Stance: Orthodox

Boxing record
- Total fights: 49
- Wins: 36
- Win by KO: 21
- Losses: 3
- Draws: 6
- No contests: 4

Joe Burman (11 December 1898– 8 April 1979) was a British-born American boxer who was briefly awarded the World bantamweight championship by the New York State Athletic Commission, when reigning champion Joe Lynch cancelled a bout with him scheduled for October 19, 1923. Burman defeated five world champions in his career, Pete Herman, Sammy Mandell, Joe Lynch, Charles Ledoux, and Johnny McCoy and was rated among the top bantamweight boxers in the world for several years. He had only three losses and was never knocked out in an exceptional career that spanned eight years, and included as many as 120 bouts.

== Early life and career ==
Burman was born in London, England, on December 11, 1898, to a large Jewish family of six children, who emigrated to the United States in his early youth. His father was of Russian-Jewish heritage, and his mother was of Polish origin. In his early career, he boxed frequently in New York, fighting his first professional bout around seventeen. On December 3, 1915, he defeated Young Pope in a four-round points decision at the Argus in New York in his first prize fight.

He lost to Johnny Ertle or Ertel, a disputed claimant to the world bantamweight championship, on November 21, 1917, in a ten-round newspaper decision at the Arcadia Rink in Milwaukee. Burman uncharacteristically scored well with a straight left in the early rounds, but Ertle later countered strongly with his right to the face of Burman, throwing more telling blows. The only knockdown of the close fight came in the eighth when Burman briefly knocked Ertle off balance while he delivered a punch. Burman dominated by the tenth, and in two instances may have nearly had Burman close to a knockout.

He lost to 1922 world junior featherweight champion Jack "Kid" Wolfe in a close ten-round newspaper decision in Buffalo, New York, on January 23, 1920. His opponent forced the battle and landed harder and more precise blows in the last four rounds, turning the decision of most newspapers against Burman. Wolfe, a slightly awkward boxer, but powerful hitter, carried a strong punch with his right which he delivered well in the fourth, sixth, ninth, and tenth rounds. In the ninth and tenth, after the boxers were warned against clinching, Wolfe found openings to score sufficiently against Burman to take the decision. Both boxers, being evenly matched, clinched frequently throughout the bout and were forced to fight at close range, displeasing the vocal crowd. In two other meetings with Wolfe, in the prior two months, Burman was unable to win a newspaper decision, scoring one draw and another loss.

=== Win over bantam champ Pete Herman ===
In an important victory on September 6, 1920, Burman defeated reigning world bantamweight champion Pete Herman in a non-title bout at the Colliseum in St. Louis in an eight-round newspaper decision. Burman was awarded five rounds, for clearly landing more blows and taking the more aggressive stance, with Herman taking two, and the rest considered even.

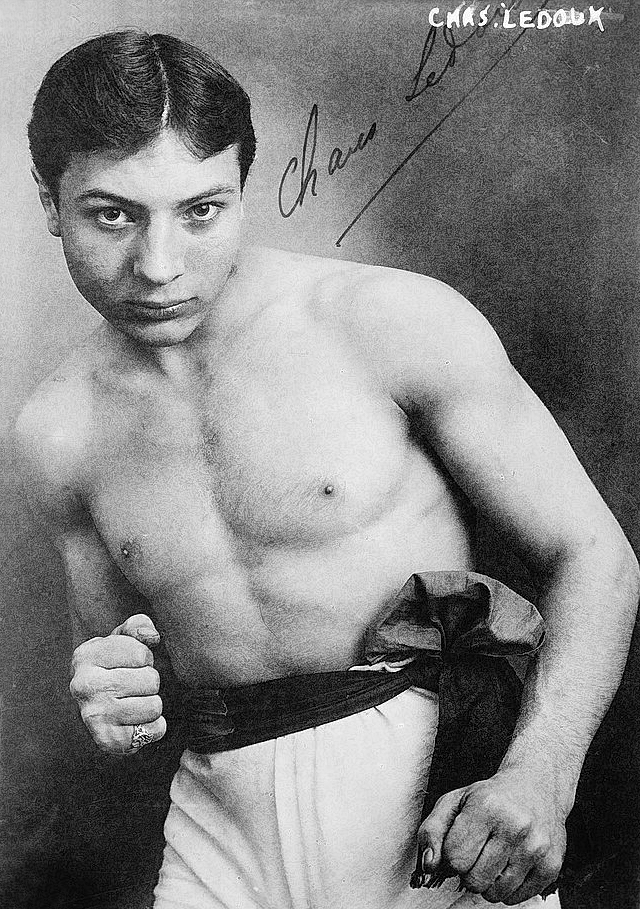
Charles Ledoux

He defeated French bantamweight champion Charles Ledoux, on September 20, 1920, in an eight-round newspaper decision of three leading Philadelphia newspapers at Philadelphia's Olympia Athletic Club. Burman won as many of six of the eight rounds, showing clever boxing and ruggedness against the blows of his opponent. He defeated Ledoux in two other meetings and drew once in ten rounds in November 1920.

According to the Chicago Tribune, Burman defeated 1919 world bantamweight champion Jackie Sharkey in New York in a ten-round no-decision bout on June 19, 1917. In a more widely publicized meeting that featured a boxing card of champions on June 21, 1921, the two drew in a ten-round points decision at the newly opened boxing drome in the Bronx. In a lightning fast fight that focused on in-fighting, both boxers went repeatedly to the body. There were minute long rallies that had the impressive crowd of 25,000 enthralled at several points in the bout. In another widely publicized meeting on October 10, 1920, the two drew in a newspaper decision in East Chicago. Burman, who was known as a good outside fighter, scored with left jabs and right crosses, while Sharkey, with a slight disadvantage in reach, dominated the infighting. Burman, who was clearly the aggressor, may have dealt fewer blows, but they landed with more steam than Sharkey's at most points in the bout.

Burman met Sammy Sandow, another Jewish boxer with Russian ancestry, and won a ten-round newspaper decision on March 31, 1922, in Detroit. The bout featured no knockdowns. Sandow used his reach advantage to send left jabs to Sandow's face, while Sandow was forced to fight in close. Burman's strong right was usually well defended by Sandow's use of a crouch to fend them off. In a previous meeting, a twelve-round points decision in Baltimore on April 30, 1920, Sandow had won decisively. Burman was probably hit twice for every blow landed on his opponent, and Sandow put him to the canvas briefly in the eight with a right. Sandow began to build a points lead in the sixth through tenth, and scored heavily in the eighth, ninth, and eleventh.

=== Close loss to champion Sammy Mandell ===
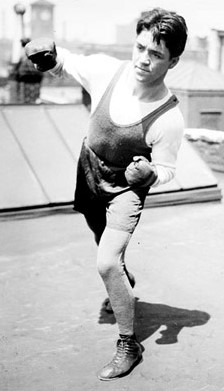
Sammy Mandell

In an important bout against a top contender Burman met 1926 world lightweight champion Sammy Mandell in a close no decision ten round bout in Aurora, Illinois, on April 29, 1922, losing in the opinion of most, though not all, local newspapers. A low blow foul against Burman in the fourth hurt his chances to obtain the decision from many newspapers. The Chicago Tribune gave Burman six of the ten rounds in the close bout, believing his blows to Mandell's midsection throughout the bout were more telling than those he received to his head and body from his opponent.

== Career highlights ==
In an important upset Burman defeated reigning world bantamweight champion Joe Lynch, at least by newspaper decision of the Chicago Tribune, on March 19, 1923, in a ten-round match before 10,000 fans at Dexter Park in Chicago. The Cincinnati Enquirer gave Burman six rounds, Lynch only two, and two were scored as even. The win spotlighted Burman as a top contender for the title, and was a turn in his favor as Burman had lost to Lynch by a significant margin in six rounds in Philadelphia on October 25, 1919, and in another short bout in 1921.

=== World bantam champ, 1923 ===
In his most important contest, Burman was scheduled to fight a rematch with bantamweight champion Joe Lynch at Madison Square Garden in a rare title match on October 19, 1923. The contest was cancelled by Lynch's handlers, who claimed he was suffering from a shoulder injury. The New York State Athletic Commission (NYSAC), believing the injury was not serious, ordered Lynch to fight, and when he refused and failed to appear for the weigh-in, the NYSAC officially stripped him of the bantamweight title and awarded it to Burman.

=== Loss of Bantam title ===
New York Jewish boxer Abe Goldstein accepted the commission's call to replace Lynch. The bout was scheduled at Madision Square Garden on October 19, 1923, the same date as the scheduled bout with Lynch. Both Goldstein and Burman made weight the day of the contest, and the NYSAC sanctioned the match as a title bout. Burman, however, lost the close and exciting bout in a twelve-round points decision. Ray Arcel, Goldstein's exceptional trainer, later wrote that Goldstein had not had time to fully train for the bout due to the short notice he was given to substitute for Lynch. Goldstein was awarded five of the rounds, Burman three, and four were even. Goldstein reached Burman's chin with his left in the early rounds repeatedly, though Burman scored with a strong right to his opponent's jaw in the second. Goldstein took the match with the effective use of his left, and a sufficient advantage in points scoring in at least five of the rounds. The Pittsburgh Gazette Times gave Burman only two of the rounds, the seventh when he connected with solid rights to Goldstein's jaw, and the tenth, and noted that Goldstein had a wide margin in the first three rounds. Though nearly blinded by a gash above his eye, Goldstein held Burman to a draw in points in the final two rounds, which strongly aided the judges in awarding him the decision.

==== Stripped of world bantam title ====
Because the NYSAC's brief award of the world bantamweight title was not won in a ring battle, and as Burman could not defeat Abe Goldstein in the sanctioned world bantamweight contest at Madison Square Garden, his two-day award of the title was not subsequently recognized by the NYSAC or any other sanctioning body.

Burman defeated Johnny McCoy (who would become the 1927 world flyweight champion), on December 21, 1923, in a late career ten-round newspaper decision in Blue Island, Illinois. Burman proved the superior boxer in all but one round, and in the sixth through tenth had McCoy desperately hanging on and badly fatigued. McCoy survived the late rounds by well timed clinching that gave him just enough time to recover. He staggered Burman in the third, but it was his only round, while Burman charged back and hammered his opponent in the fourth. Burman's subsequent place in boxing history was diminished considerably, though his record was outstanding and his performance against five boxing champions included four wins, with a possible win over the fifth, Sammy Mandell.

== Life after boxing ==
He appeared as himself in the Selig Athletic Feature film #44, a boxing documentary produced by William Nicholas Selig, along with boxer Johnny Ertle, and wrestlers Sam Varrion and Ben Ruben.

After retiring from boxing around 1924, Burman ran a popular custom men's clothing store in Chicago's Loop district. In 1928, he was back in the newspapers when he was shot in the leg in Chicago's Davis hotel and could not tell police who shot him or why.

He worked as a matchmaker and promoter at Chicago's Marigold Gardens in the early 1950s before later moving to the west coast around 1959.

After working as a liquor salesman in Los Angeles, Burman died there on April 8, 1979, after a long bout with liver cancer. Services were held at Hillside Memorial on April 10, in Culver City, California.

== Professional boxing record ==
All information in this section is derived from BoxRec, unless otherwise stated.

=== Official record ===
129 fights	36 wins	3 losses
By knockout	21	0
By decision	14	3
By disqualification	1	0
Draws	6	
Newspaper decisions/draws	84	

All newspaper decisions are officially regarded as "no decision" bouts and are not counted in the win/loss/draw column.

No.	Result	Record	Opponent	Type	Round	Date	Location	Age	Notes
129	Draw	36–3–6 (84)	Dick Griffin	PTS	4	Mar 25, 1924	25 years, 104 days	Arena, Vernon, California, U.S.	
128	Loss	36–3–5 (84)	Ernie Goozeman	NWS	10	Dec 28, 1923	25 years, 16 days	Auditorium, Milwaukee, Wisconsin, U.S.	
127	Win	36–3–5 (83)	Johnny McCoy	NWS	10	Dec 21, 1923	25 years, 9 days	Island A.A., Blue Island, Florida, U.S.	
126	Loss	36–3–5 (82)	Johnny Curtin	NWS	10	Nov 27, 1923	24 years, 350 days	Coliseum, Saint Louis, Missouri, U.S.	
125	Loss	36–3–5 (81)	Abe Goldstein	PTS	12	Oct 19, 1923	24 years, 311 days	Madison Square Garden, New York City, New York, U.S.	Lost NYSAC bantamweight title
124	Win	36–2–5 (81)	George Butch	NWS	10	Aug 17, 1923	24 years, 248 days	Mullen-Sager Arena, Aurora, Illinois, U.S.	
123	Win	36–2–5 (80)	Patsy Flanagan	KO	3 (10)	May 29, 1923	24 years, 168 days	Dexter Park Pavilion, Chicago, Illinois, U.S.	
122	Win	35–2–5 (80)	Joe Lynch	NWS	10	Mar 19, 1923	24 years, 97 days	Dexter Park Pavilion, Chicago, Illinois, U.S.	
121	Win	35–2–5 (79)	Frankie Schaeffer	NWS	10	Mar 12, 1923	24 years, 90 days	Ashland Blvd. Auditorium, Chicago, Illinois, U.S.	
120	Win	35–2–5 (78)	Midget Smith	NWS	10	Feb 21, 1923	24 years, 71 days	Suburban Club, Chicago, Illinois, U.S.	
119	Win	35–2–5 (77)	Patsy Flanagan	NWS	10	Jan 29, 1923	24 years, 48 days	Suburban club, Chicago suburb, Illinois, U.S.	
118	Win	35–2–5 (76)	Midget Smith	NWS	10	Jan 15, 1923	24 years, 34 days	Detroit, Michigan, U.S.	
117	Win	35–2–5 (75)	Cowboy Eddie Anderson	NWS	10	Aug 25, 1922	23 years, 256 days	Mullen-Sager Arena, Aurora, Illinois, U.S.	
116	Loss	35–2–5 (74)	Mike Dundee	NWS	10	Jul 14, 1922	23 years, 214 days	Mullen-Sager Arena, Aurora, Illinois, U.S.	
115	Loss	35–2–5 (73)	Sammy Mandell	NWS	10	May 29, 1922	23 years, 168 days	Mullen-Sager Arena, Aurora, Illinois, U.S.	
114	Win	35–2–5 (72)	Bud Dempsey	PTS	10	May 22, 1922	23 years, 161 days	Dyckman Oval, New York City, New York, U.S.	
113	Win	34–2–5 (72)	Tommy Ryan	NWS	12	May 12, 1922	23 years, 151 days	Jefferson County Armory, Louisville, Kentucky, U.S.	
112	Win	34–2–5 (71)	Marty Collins	PTS	10	Apr 24, 1922	23 years, 133 days	Mount Royal Arena, Ontario, Montreal, Canada	
111	Win	33–2–5 (71)	Sammy Sandow	NWS	10	Mar 31, 1922	23 years, 109 days	Avenue Theater, Detroit, Michigan, U.S.	
110	Win	33–2–5 (70)	Midget Smith	PTS	12	Mar 20, 1922	23 years, 98 days	Madison Square Garden, New York City, New York, U.S.	
109	Draw	32–2–5 (70)	Tommy Ryan	NWS	12	Feb 27, 1922	23 years, 77 days	Jefferson County Armory, Louisville, Kentucky, U.S.	
108	Win	32–2–5 (69)	Jack Eile	NWS	8	Feb 24, 1922	23 years, 74 days	Suburban Club, Chicago, Illinois, U.S.	
107	Win	32–2–5 (68)	Johnny Brown	NWS	8	Nov 28, 1921	22 years, 351 days	Olympia A.C., Philadelphia, Pennsylvania, U.S.	
106	Win	32–2–5 (67)	Benny Gould	PTS	10	Nov 22, 1921	22 years, 345 days	The Armouries, Toronto, Ontario, Canada	
105	Win	31–2–5 (67)	Midget Smith	PTS	10	Oct 7, 1921	22 years, 299 days	Madison Square Garden, New York City, New York, U.S.	
104	Draw	30–2–5 (67)	Midget Smith	NWS	10	Sep 9, 1921	22 years, 271 days	Twin Cities A.C., East Chicago, Indiana, U.S.	
103	Loss	30–2–5 (66)	Midget Smith	NWS	10	Jul 22, 1921	22 years, 222 days	Twin Cities A.C., East Chicago, Indiana, U.S.	
102	Win	30–2–5 (65)	Charles Ledoux	PTS	12	Jul 12, 1921	22 years, 212 days	Boxing Drome, New York City, New York, U.S.	
101	Win	29–2–5 (65)	Joe Lynch	NWS	10	Jun 28, 1921	22 years, 198 days	Twin City A.C., East Chicago, Indiana, U.S.	
100	Draw	29–2–5 (64)	Jackie Sharkey	PTS	10	Jun 21, 1921	22 years, 191 days	Boxing Drome, New York City, New York, U.S.	
99	Loss	29–2–4 (64)	Kid Williams	NWS	8	Apr 25, 1921	22 years, 134 days	National A.C., Philadelphia, Pennsylvania, U.S.	
98	Win	29–2–4 (63)	Dick Loadman	NWS	8	Apr 11, 1921	22 years, 120 days	National A.C., Philadelphia, Pennsylvania, U.S.	
97	Draw	29–2–4 (62)	Roy Moore	NWS	12	Apr 8, 1921	22 years, 117 days	Coliseum, Toledo, Ohio, U.S.	
96	Win	29–2–4 (61)	Paul Demers	PTS	10	Mar 16, 1921	22 years, 94 days	New Bedford, Massachusetts, U.S.	
95	Loss	28–2–4 (61)	Joe Lynch	NWS	10	Mar 10, 1921	22 years, 88 days	Cleveland, Ohio, U.S.	
94	Win	28–2–4 (60)	Abe Friedman	PTS	10	Feb 1, 1921	22 years, 51 days	Mechanics Building, Boston, Massachusetts, U.S.	
93	Win	27–2–4 (60)	Carl Tremaine	NWS	10	Jan 19, 1921	22 years, 38 days	Armory, Cleveland, Ohio, U.S.	
92	Win	27–2–4 (59)	Joe O'Donnell	NWS	8	Jan 8, 1921	22 years, 27 days	National A.C., Philadelphia, Pennsylvania, U.S.	
91	Loss	27–2–4 (58)	Carl Tremaine	NWS	10	Dec 17, 1920	22 years, 5 days	Cleveland, Ohio, U.S.	
90	Loss	27–2–4 (57)	Young Montreal	NWS	10	Dec 6, 1920	21 years, 360 days	Roller Palace Rink, Detroit, Michigan, U.S.	
89	Draw	27–2–4 (56)	Charles Ledoux	PTS	10	Nov 26, 1920	21 years, 350 days	Infantry Hall, Providence, Rhode Island, U.S.	
88	Win	27–2–3 (56)	Carl Tremaine	NWS	8	Nov 22, 1920	21 years, 346 days	Olympia A.C., Philadelphia, Pennsylvania, U.S.	
87	Draw	27–2–3 (55)	Jackie Sharkey	NWS	10	Oct 9, 1920	21 years, 302 days	East Chicago, Indiana, U.S.	
86	Win	27–2–3 (54)	Charles Ledoux	NWS	8	Sep 20, 1920	21 years, 283 days	Olympia A.C., Philadelphia, Pennsylvania, U.S.	
85	Win	27–2–3 (53)	Joe O'Donnell	NWS	8	Sep 10, 1920	21 years, 273 days	Armory, Camden, New Jersey, U.S.	
84	Win	27–2–3 (52)	Pete Herman	NWS	8	Sep 6, 1920	21 years, 269 days	Coliseum, Saint Louis, Missouri, U.S.	
83	Win	27–2–3 (51)	Frankie Daly	NWS	8	Aug 23, 1920	21 years, 255 days	Battery A Arena, Saint Louis, Missouri, U.S.	
82	Win	27–2–3 (50)	Charles Ledoux	NWS	8	Jun 23, 1920	21 years, 194 days	Ice Palace, Philadelphia, Pennsylvania, U.S.	
81	Draw	27–2–3 (49)	Joe O'Donnell	NWS	6	May 3, 1920	21 years, 143 days	Olympia A.C., Philadelphia, Pennsylvania, U.S.	
80	Loss	27–2–3 (48)	Sammy Sandow	PTS	12	Apr 30, 1920	21 years, 140 days	Colonial Theater, Baltimore, Maryland, U.S.	
79	Win	27–1–3 (48)	Patsy Wallace	NWS	6	Apr 24, 1920	21 years, 134 days	National A.C., Philadelphia, Pennsylvania, U.S.	
78	Win	27–1–3 (47)	Marty Collins	NWS	12	Apr 14, 1920	21 years, 124 days	Portland, Maine, U.S.	
77	Win	27–1–3 (46)	Sammy Sieger	NWS	8	Apr 12, 1920	21 years, 122 days	Grand Theatre, Trenton A.C., Trenton, New Jersey, U.S.	
76	Win	27–1–3 (45)	Hughie Hutchinson	NWS	6	Apr 5, 1920	21 years, 115 days	Olympia A.C., Philadelphia, Pennsylvania, U.S.	
75	Win	27–1–3 (44)	Pekin Kid Herman	NWS	10	Mar 15, 1920	21 years, 94 days	Peoria, Illinois, U.S.	
74	Loss	27–1–3 (43)	Jack "Kid" Wolfe	NWS	10	Jan 23, 1920	21 years, 42 days	Broadway Auditorium, Buffalo, New York, U.S.	
73	Draw	27–1–3 (42)	Jack "Kid" Wolfe	PTS	10	Jan 19, 1920	21 years, 38 days	Peoria, Illinois, U.S.	
72	Win	27–1–2 (42)	Dick Griffin	KO	3 (12)	Jan 12, 1920	21 years, 31 days	Stockyards Stadium, Denver, Colorado, U.S.	
71	Win	26–1–2 (42)	Dick Griffin	DQ	6 (12)	Jan 1, 1920	21 years, 20 days	Moose Auditorium, Colorado Springs, Colorado, U.S.	
70	Loss	25–1–2 (42)	Jack "Kid" Wolfe	NWS	12	Dec 12, 1919	21 years, 0 days	Akron, Ohio, U.S.	
69	Win	25–1–2 (41)	Bernie Hahn	PTS	8	Dec 8, 1919	20 years, 361 days	Southern A.C., Memphis, Tennessee, U.S.	
68	Win	24–1–2 (41)	Mike Dundee	NWS	10	Dec 1, 1919	20 years, 354 days	Lakeside Arena, Racine, Wisconsin, U.S.	
67	Loss	24–1–2 (40)	Joe Lynch	NWS	6	Oct 25, 1919	20 years, 317 days	National A.C., Philadelphia, Pennsylvania, U.S.	
66	Draw	24–1–2 (39)	Joe Lynch	NWS	6	Sep 29, 1919	20 years, 291 days	Olympia A.C., Philadelphia, Pennsylvania, U.S.	
65	Win	24–1–2 (38)	Roy Moore	NWS	10	Sep 22, 1919	20 years, 284 days	Peoria, Illinois, U.S.	
64	Win	24–1–2 (37)	Billy Bevan	NWS	6	Sep 15, 1919	20 years, 277 days	Olympia A.C., Philadelphia, Pennsylvania, U.S.	
63	Win	24–1–2 (36)	Jim Roberts	KO	1 (?)	Sep 10, 1919	20 years, 272 days	Brooklyn, New York City, New York, U.S.	
62	Win	23–1–2 (36)	Joe Leopold	KO	8 (12)	Sep 3, 1919	20 years, 265 days	Colorado Springs, Colorado, U.S.	
61	Win	22–1–2 (36)	Pekin Kid Herman	KO	7 (?)	Jul 4, 1919	20 years, 204 days	Benton Harbor, Michigan, U.S.	
60	Loss	21–1–2 (36)	Jackie Sharkey	NWS	10	Jun 16, 1919	20 years, 186 days	Auditorium, Milwaukee, Wisconsin, U.S.	
59	Win	21–1–2 (35)	Patsy Johnson	PTS	15	Jun 6, 1919	20 years, 176 days	Oriole Park, Baltimore, Maryland, U.S.	
58	Loss	20–1–2 (35)	Jack "Kid" Wolfe	NWS	10	May 1, 1919	20 years, 110 days	Gray's Armory, Cleveland, Ohio, U.S.	
57	Win	20–1–2 (34)	Dick Loadman	NWS	10	Apr 23, 1919	20 years, 132 days	Auditorium, Milwaukee, Wisconsin, U.S.	
56	Win	20–1–2 (33)	Harry Coulin	NWS	10	Apr 14, 1919	20 years, 123 days	Duquesne Garden, Pittsburgh, Pennsylvania, U.S.	
55	Draw	20–1–2 (32)	Frankie Daly	PTS	12	Apr 4, 1919	20 years, 113 days	Albaugh Theater, Baltimore, Maryland, U.S.	
54	Win	20–1–1 (32)	Joe O'Donnell	NWS	6	Mar 22, 1919	20 years, 100 days	National A.C., Philadelphia, Pennsylvania, U.S.	
53	Draw	20–1–1 (31)	Charlie Beecher	NWS	6	Mar 10, 1919	20 years, 88 days	Harrison A.C., Trenton, New Jersey, U.S.	
52	Draw	20–1–1 (30)	Johnny Murray	NWS	6	Feb 24, 1919	20 years, 74 days	Olympia A.C., Philadelphia, Pennsylvania, U.S.	
51	Win	20–1–1 (29)	Joe O'Donnell	NWS	6	Feb 3, 1919	20 years, 53 days	Olympia A.C., Philadelphia, Pennsylvania, U.S.	
50	Draw	20–1–1 (28)	Jackie Sharkey	NWS	8	Jan 27, 1919	20 years, 46 days	Grand Theatre, Trenton, New Jersey, U.S.	
49	Win	20–1–1 (27)	Frankie Conway	KO	5 (10)	Jan 24, 1919	20 years, 43 days	Albaugh Theater, Baltimore, Maryland, U.S.	
48	Win	19–1–1 (27)	Eddie Wimler	PTS	12	Dec 26, 1918	20 years, 14 days	Albaugh Theater, Baltimore, Maryland, U.S.	
47	Win	18–1–1 (27)	Frankie Conway	NWS	6	Dec 14, 1918	20 years, 2 days	National A.C., Philadelphia, Pennsylvania, U.S.	
46	Win	18–1–1 (26)	Dave Astey	KO	1 (6)	Nov 28, 1918	19 years, 351 days	National A.C., Philadelphia, Pennsylvania, U.S.	
45	Win	17–1–1 (26)	Sammy Marino	NWS	6	Nov 15, 1918	19 years, 338 days	Cambria A.C., Philadelphia, Pennsylvania, U.S.	
44	Win	17–1–1 (25)	Young Terry McGovern	NWS	6	Nov 6, 1918	19 years, 329 days	Olympia A.C., Philadelphia, Pennsylvania, U.S.	
43	Win	17–1–1 (24)	Joe Tuber	NWS	6	Sep 21, 1918	19 years, 283 days	National A.C., Philadelphia, Pennsylvania, U.S.	
42	Draw	17–1–1 (23)	Earl Puryear	PTS	10	Sep 16, 1918	19 years, 278 days	La Salle, Illinois, U.S.	
41	Win	17–1 (23)	Young Joey Mendo	KO	9 (10)	May 6, 1918	19 years, 145 days	Lyric Theater, Baltimore, Maryland, U.S.	
40	Win	16–1 (23)	Mike Ertle	NWS	10	Apr 30, 1918	19 years, 139 days	Auditorium, Milwaukee, Wisconsin, U.S.	
39	Draw	16–1 (22)	Andy Chaney	NWS	10	Apr 22, 1918	19 years, 131 days	Lyric Theater, Baltimore, Maryland, U.S.	
38	Loss	16–1 (21)	Johnny Ertle	NWS	10	Nov 21, 1917	18 years, 344 days	Arcadia Rink, Milwaukee, Wisconsin, U.S.	World bantamweight title claim at stake; (via KO only)
37	Win	16–1 (20)	Frankie Daly	NWS	10	Nov 10, 1917	18 years, 333 days	Fairmont A.C., New York City, New York, U.S.	
36	Win	16–1 (19)	Willie Astey	NWS	10	Nov 2, 1917	18 years, 325 days	Harlem S.C., New York City, New York, U.S.	
35	Win	16–1 (18)	George Thompson	NWS	10	Jul 23, 1917	18 years, 223 days	Lakeside Arena, Racine, Wisconsin, U.S.	
34	Win	16–1 (17)	Jackie Sharkey	NWS	10	Jun 19, 1917	18 years, 189 days	Pioneer S.C., New York City, New York, U.S.	
33	Win	16–1 (16)	Frankie Williams	NWS	10	May 31, 1917	18 years, 170 days	Hunts Point A.C., New York City, New York, U.S.	
32	Win	16–1 (15)	Dutch Brandt	NWS	10	May 26, 1917	18 years, 165 days	Clermont Avenue Rink, New York City, New York, U.S.	
31	Draw	16–1 (14)	Frankie Clarke	NWS	10	May 21, 1917	18 years, 160 days	Olympia A.C., Philadelphia, Pennsylvania, U.S.	
30	Win	16–1 (13)	Dutch Brandt	NWS	10	May 5, 1917	18 years, 144 days	Clermont Avenue Rink, New York City, New York, U.S.	
29	Win	16–1 (12)	Frankie Daly	NWS	10	Mar 22, 1917	18 years, 100 days	Fairmont A.C., New York City, New York, U.S.	
28	Draw	16–1 (11)	Billy Fitzsimmons	NWS	10	Mar 9, 1917	18 years, 87 days	Harlem S.C., New York City, New York, U.S.	
27	Win	16–1 (10)	Jimmy Murray	NWS	10	Mar 3, 1917	18 years, 81 days	Clermont Avenue Rink, New York City, New York, U.S.	
26	Win	16–1 (9)	Billy Fitzsimmons	NWS	10	Feb 22, 1917	18 years, 72 days	Broadway S.C., New York City, New York, U.S.	
25	Win	16–1 (8)	Johnny Solzberg	NWS	10	Feb 9, 1917	18 years, 59 days	Harlem S.C., New York City, New York, U.S.	
24	Win	16–1 (7)	Willie Astey	NWS	10	Jan 26, 1917	18 years, 45 days	Harlem S.C., New York City, New York, U.S.	
23	Win	16–1 (6)	Murray Allen	NWS	10	Jan 15, 1917	18 years, 34 days	Olympic Athletic Club, New York City, New York, U.S.	
22	Win	16–1 (5)	Happy Smith	NWS	10	Jan 6, 1917	18 years, 25 days	Fairmont A.C., New York City, New York, U.S.	
21	Win	16–1 (4)	Kid Rash	KO	3 (?)	Dec 29, 1916	18 years, 17 days	Harlem S.C., New York City, New York, U.S.	
20	Win	15–1 (4)	Kid Rash	NWS	6	Dec 8, 1916	17 years, 362 days	Harlem S.C., New York City, New York, U.S.	
19	Win	15–1 (3)	Jack Courtney	NWS	10	Nov 4, 1916	17 years, 328 days	Fairmont A.C., New York City, New York, U.S.	
18	Win	15–1 (2)	Georgie Lewis	KO	2 (?)	Oct 24, 1916	17 years, 317 days	New York City, New York, U.S.	
17	Draw	14–1 (2)	Frankie Williams	NWS	6	Oct 20, 1916	17 years, 313 days	Harlem S.C., New York City, New York, U.S.	
16	Draw	14–1 (1)	Jack Tracey	NWS	6	Oct 10, 1916	17 years, 303 days	Hunts Point Casino, New York City, New York, U.S.	
15	Win	14–1	Mike Hogan	TKO	2 (?)	Sep 25, 1916	17 years, 288 days	Clermont Avenue Rink, New York City, New York, U.S.	
14	Win	13–1	Kid McCarthy	KO	1 (?)	Sep 21, 1916	17 years, 284 days	Clermont Avenue Rink, New York City, New York, U.S.	
13	Win	12–1	Frankie Bell	TKO	4 (4)	Sep 16, 1916	17 years, 279 days	Broadway Arena, New York City, New York, U.S.	
12	Win	11–1	Eddie Ryan	KO	1 (?)	Sep 12, 1916	17 years, 275 days	New York City, New York, U.S.	
11	Win	10–1	Jim Roberts	KO	1 (?)	Sep 10, 1916	17 years, 273 days	New York City, New York, U.S.	
10	Win	9–1	Harry Fields	KO	1 (?)	Sep 5, 1916	17 years, 268 days	New York City, New York, U.S.	
9	Win	8–1	Kid Rash	KO	4 (?)	Aug 29, 1916	17 years, 261 days	Harlem S.C., New York City, New York, U.S.	
8	Win	7–1	Bobby Turner	KO	4 (?)	Jul 21, 1916	17 years, 222 days	New Polo A.C., New York City, New York, U.S.	
7	Loss	6–1	Gussie Lewis	PTS	6	Jul 13, 1916	17 years, 214 days	Oriole Park, Baltimore, Maryland, U.S.	
6	Win	6–0	Tommy White	KO	5 (?)	Apr 25, 1916	17 years, 135 days	Argo, Illinois, U.S.	
5	Win	5–0	Young Pope	PTS	4	Apr 15, 1916	17 years, 125 days	Chicago, Illinois, U.S.	
4	Win	4–0	John Fallon	KO	2 (?)	Apr 8, 1916	17 years, 118 days	Chicago, Illinois, U.S.	
3	Win	3–0	Kid Hogan	PTS	6	Mar 30, 1916	17 years, 109 days	Lamont, Illinois, U.S.	
2	Win	2–0	Jimmy Mars	KO	3 (?)	Mar 25, 1916	17 years, 104 days	Argo, Illinois, U.S.	
1	Win	1–0	Young Pope	PTS	4	Dec 3, 1915	16 years, 356 days	Argo, Illinois, U.S.	

=== Unofficial record ===
129 fights	91 wins	18 losses
By knockout	21	0
By decision	69	18
By disqualification	1	0
Draws	20	

Record with the inclusion of newspaper decisions in the win/loss/draw column.

No.	Result	Record	Opponent	Type	Round	Date	Age	Location	Notes
129	Draw	91–18–20	Dick Griffin	PTS	4	Mar 25, 1924	25 years, 104 days	Arena, Vernon, California, U.S.	
128	Loss	91–18–19	Ernie Goozeman	NWS	10	Dec 28, 1923	25 years, 16 days	Auditorium, Milwaukee, Wisconsin, U.S.	
127	Win	91–17–19	Johnny McCoy	NWS	10	Dec 21, 1923	25 years, 9 days	Island A.A., Blue Island, Florida, U.S.	
126	Loss	90–17–19	Johnny Curtin	NWS	10	Nov 27, 1923	24 years, 350 days	Coliseum, Saint Louis, Missouri, U.S.	
125	Loss	90–16–19	Abe Goldstein	PTS	12	Oct 19, 1923	24 years, 311 days	Madison Square Garden, New York City, New York, U.S.	Lost NYSAC bantamweight title
124	Win	90–15–19	George Butch	NWS	10	Aug 17, 1923	24 years, 248 days	Mullen-Sager Arena, Aurora, Illinois, U.S.	
123	Win	89–15–19	Patsy Flanagan	KO	3 (10)	May 29, 1923	24 years, 168 days	Dexter Park Pavilion, Chicago, Illinois, U.S.	
122	Win	88–15–19	Joe Lynch	NWS	10	Mar 19, 1923	24 years, 97 days	Dexter Park Pavilion, Chicago, Illinois, U.S.	
121	Win	87–15–19	Frankie Schaeffer	NWS	10	Mar 12, 1923	24 years, 90 days	Ashland Blvd. Auditorium, Chicago, Illinois, U.S.	
120	Win	86–15–19	Midget Smith	NWS	10	Feb 21, 1923	24 years, 71 days	Suburban Club, Chicago, Illinois, U.S.	
119	Win	85–15–19	Patsy Flanagan	NWS	10	Jan 29, 1923	24 years, 48 days	Suburban club, Chicago suburb, Illinois, U.S.	
118	Win	84–15–19	Midget Smith	NWS	10	Jan 15, 1923	24 years, 34 days	Detroit, Michigan, U.S.	
117	Win	83–15–19	Cowboy Eddie Anderson	NWS	10	Aug 25, 1922	23 years, 256 days	Mullen-Sager Arena, Aurora, Illinois, U.S.	
116	Loss	82–15–19	Mike Dundee	NWS	10	Jul 14, 1922	23 years, 214 days	Mullen-Sager Arena, Aurora, Illinois, U.S.	
115	Loss	82–14–19	Sammy Mandell	NWS	10	May 29, 1922	23 years, 168 days	Mullen-Sager Arena, Aurora, Illinois, U.S.	
114	Win	82–13–19	Bud Dempsey	PTS	10	May 22, 1922	23 years, 161 days	Dyckman Oval, New York City, New York, U.S.	
113	Win	81–13–19	Tommy Ryan	NWS	12	May 12, 1922	23 years, 151 days	Jefferson County Armory, Louisville, Kentucky, U.S.	
112	Win	80–13–19	Marty Collins	PTS	10	Apr 24, 1922	23 years, 133 days	Mount Royal Arena, Ontario, Montreal, Canada	
111	Win	79–13–19	Sammy Sandow	NWS	10	Mar 31, 1922	23 years, 109 days	Avenue Theater, Detroit, Michigan, U.S.	
110	Win	78–13–19	Midget Smith	PTS	12	Mar 20, 1922	23 years, 98 days	Madison Square Garden, New York City, New York, U.S.	
109	Draw	77–13–19	Tommy Ryan	NWS	12	Feb 27, 1922	23 years, 77 days	Jefferson County Armory, Louisville, Kentucky, U.S.	
108	Win	77–13–18	Jack Eile	NWS	8	Feb 24, 1922	23 years, 74 days	Suburban Club, Chicago, Illinois, U.S.	
107	Win	76–13–18	Johnny Brown	NWS	8	Nov 28, 1921	22 years, 351 days	Olympia A.C., Philadelphia, Pennsylvania, U.S.	
106	Win	75–13–18	Benny Gould	PTS	10	Nov 22, 1921	22 years, 345 days	The Armouries, Toronto, Ontario, Canada	
105	Win	74–13–18	Midget Smith	PTS	10	Oct 7, 1921	22 years, 299 days	Madison Square Garden, New York City, New York, U.S.	
104	Draw	73–13–18	Midget Smith	NWS	10	Sep 9, 1921	22 years, 271 days	Twin Cities A.C., East Chicago, Indiana, U.S.	
103	Loss	73–13–17	Midget Smith	NWS	10	Jul 22, 1921	22 years, 222 days	Twin Cities A.C., East Chicago, Indiana, U.S.	
102	Win	73–12–17	Charles Ledoux	PTS	12	Jul 12, 1921	22 years, 212 days	Boxing Drome, New York City, New York, U.S.	
101	Win	72–12–17	Joe Lynch	NWS	10	Jun 28, 1921	22 years, 198 days	Twin City A.C., East Chicago, Indiana, U.S.	
100	Draw	71–12–17	Jackie Sharkey	PTS	10	Jun 21, 1921	22 years, 191 days	Boxing Drome, New York City, New York, U.S.	
99	Loss	71–12–16	Kid Williams	NWS	8	Apr 25, 1921	22 years, 134 days	National A.C., Philadelphia, Pennsylvania, U.S.	
98	Win	71–11–16	Dick Loadman	NWS	8	Apr 11, 1921	22 years, 120 days	National A.C., Philadelphia, Pennsylvania, U.S.	
97	Draw	70–11–16	Roy Moore	NWS	12	Apr 8, 1921	22 years, 117 days	Coliseum, Toledo, Ohio, U.S.	
96	Win	70–11–15	Paul Demers	PTS	10	Mar 16, 1921	22 years, 94 days	New Bedford, Massachusetts, U.S.	
95	Loss	69–11–15	Joe Lynch	NWS	10	Mar 10, 1921	22 years, 88 days	Cleveland, Ohio, U.S.	
94	Win	69–10–15	Abe Friedman	PTS	10	Feb 1, 1921	22 years, 51 days	Mechanics Building, Boston, Massachusetts, U.S.	
93	Win	68–10–15	Carl Tremaine	NWS	10	Jan 19, 1921	22 years, 38 days	Armory, Cleveland, Ohio, U.S.	
92	Win	67–10–15	Joe O'Donnell	NWS	8	Jan 8, 1921	22 years, 27 days	National A.C., Philadelphia, Pennsylvania, U.S.	
91	Loss	66–10–15	Carl Tremaine	NWS	10	Dec 17, 1920	22 years, 5 days	Cleveland, Ohio, U.S.	
90	Loss	66–9–15	Young Montreal	NWS	10	Dec 6, 1920	21 years, 360 days	Roller Palace Rink, Detroit, Michigan, U.S.	
89	Draw	66–8–15	Charles Ledoux	PTS	10	Nov 26, 1920	21 years, 350 days	Infantry Hall, Providence, Rhode Island, U.S.	
88	Win	66–8–14	Carl Tremaine	NWS	8	Nov 22, 1920	21 years, 346 days	Olympia A.C., Philadelphia, Pennsylvania, U.S.	
87	Draw	65–8–14	Jackie Sharkey	NWS	10	Oct 9, 1920	21 years, 302 days	East Chicago, Indiana, U.S.	
86	Win	65–8–13	Charles Ledoux	NWS	8	Sep 20, 1920	21 years, 283 days	Olympia A.C., Philadelphia, Pennsylvania, U.S.	
85	Win	64–8–13	Joe O'Donnell	NWS	8	Sep 10, 1920	21 years, 273 days	Armory, Camden, New Jersey, U.S.	
84	Win	63–8–13	Pete Herman	NWS	8	Sep 6, 1920	21 years, 269 days	Coliseum, Saint Louis, Missouri, U.S.	
83	Win	62–8–13	Frankie Daly	NWS	8	Aug 23, 1920	21 years, 255 days	Battery A Arena, Saint Louis, Missouri, U.S.	
82	Win	61–8–13	Charles Ledoux	NWS	8	Jun 23, 1920	21 years, 194 days	Ice Palace, Philadelphia, Pennsylvania, U.S.	
81	Draw	60–8–13	Joe O'Donnell	NWS	6	May 3, 1920	21 years, 143 days	Olympia A.C., Philadelphia, Pennsylvania, U.S.	
80	Loss	60–8–12	Sammy Sandow	PTS	12	Apr 30, 1920	21 years, 140 days	Colonial Theater, Baltimore, Maryland, U.S.	
79	Win	60–7–12	Patsy Wallace	NWS	6	Apr 24, 1920	21 years, 134 days	National A.C., Philadelphia, Pennsylvania, U.S.	
78	Win	59–7–12	Marty Collins	NWS	12	Apr 14, 1920	21 years, 124 days	Portland, Maine, U.S.	
77	Win	58–7–12	Sammy Sieger	NWS	8	Apr 12, 1920	21 years, 122 days	Grand Theatre, Trenton A.C., Trenton, New Jersey, U.S.	
76	Win	57–7–12	Hughie Hutchinson	NWS	6	Apr 5, 1920	21 years, 115 days	Olympia A.C., Philadelphia, Pennsylvania, U.S.	
75	Win	56–7–12	Pekin Kid Herman	NWS	10	Mar 15, 1920	21 years, 94 days	Peoria, Illinois, U.S.	
74	Loss	55–7–12	Jack "Kid" Wolfe	NWS	10	Jan 23, 1920	21 years, 42 days	Broadway Auditorium, Buffalo, New York, U.S.	
73	Draw	55–6–12	Jack "Kid" Wolfe	PTS	10	Jan 19, 1920	21 years, 38 days	Peoria, Illinois, U.S.	
72	Win	55–6–11	Dick Griffin	KO	3 (12)	Jan 12, 1920	21 years, 31 days	Stockyards Stadium, Denver, Colorado, U.S.	
71	Win	54–6–11	Dick Griffin	DQ	6 (12)	Jan 1, 1920	21 years, 20 days	Moose Auditorium, Colorado Springs, Colorado, U.S.	
70	Loss	53–6–11	Jack "Kid" Wolfe	NWS	12	Dec 12, 1919	21 years, 0 days	Akron, Ohio, U.S.	
69	Win	53–5–11	Bernie Hahn	PTS	8	Dec 8, 1919	20 years, 361 days	Southern A.C., Memphis, Tennessee, U.S.	
68	Win	52–5–11	Mike Dundee	NWS	10	Dec 1, 1919	20 years, 354 days	Lakeside Arena, Racine, Wisconsin, U.S.	
67	Loss	51–5–11	Joe Lynch	NWS	6	Oct 25, 1919	20 years, 317 days	National A.C., Philadelphia, Pennsylvania, U.S.	
66	Draw	51–4–11	Joe Lynch	NWS	6	Sep 29, 1919	20 years, 291 days	Olympia A.C., Philadelphia, Pennsylvania, U.S.	
65	Win	51–4–10	Roy Moore	NWS	10	Sep 22, 1919	20 years, 284 days	Peoria, Illinois, U.S.	
64	Win	50–4–10	Billy Bevan	NWS	6	Sep 15, 1919	20 years, 277 days	Olympia A.C., Philadelphia, Pennsylvania, U.S.	
63	Win	49–4–10	Jim Roberts	KO	1 (?)	Sep 10, 1919	20 years, 272 days	Brooklyn, New York City, New York, U.S.	
62	Win	48–4–10	Joe Leopold	KO	8 (12)	Sep 3, 1919	20 years, 265 days	Colorado Springs, Colorado, U.S.	
61	Win	47–4–10	Pekin Kid Herman	KO	7 (?)	Jul 4, 1919	20 years, 204 days	Benton Harbor, Michigan, U.S.	
60	Loss	46–4–10	Jackie Sharkey	NWS	10	Jun 16, 1919	20 years, 186 days	Auditorium, Milwaukee, Wisconsin, U.S.	
59	Win	46–3–10	Patsy Johnson	PTS	15	Jun 6, 1919	20 years, 176 days	Oriole Park, Baltimore, Maryland, U.S.	
58	Loss	45–3–10	Jack "Kid" Wolfe	NWS	10	May 1, 1919	20 years, 110 days	Gray's Armory, Cleveland, Ohio, U.S.	
57	Win	45–2–10	Dick Loadman	NWS	10	Apr 23, 1919	20 years, 132 days	Auditorium, Milwaukee, Wisconsin, U.S.	
56	Win	44–2–10	Harry Coulin	NWS	10	Apr 14, 1919	20 years, 123 days	Duquesne Garden, Pittsburgh, Pennsylvania, U.S.	
55	Draw	43–2–10	Frankie Daly	PTS	12	Apr 4, 1919	20 years, 113 days	Albaugh Theater, Baltimore, Maryland, U.S.	
54	Win	43–2–9	Joe O'Donnell	NWS	6	Mar 22, 1919	20 years, 100 days	National A.C., Philadelphia, Pennsylvania, U.S.	
53	Draw	42–2–9	Charlie Beecher	NWS	6	Mar 10, 1919	20 years, 88 days	Harrison A.C., Trenton, New Jersey, U.S.	
52	Draw	42–2–8	Johnny Murray	NWS	6	Feb 24, 1919	20 years, 74 days	Olympia A.C., Philadelphia, Pennsylvania, U.S.	
51	Win	42–2–7	Joe O'Donnell	NWS	6	Feb 3, 1919	20 years, 53 days	Olympia A.C., Philadelphia, Pennsylvania, U.S.	
50	Draw	41–2–7	Jackie Sharkey	NWS	8	Jan 27, 1919	20 years, 46 days	Grand Theatre, Trenton, New Jersey, U.S.	
49	Win	41–2–6	Frankie Conway	KO	5 (10)	Jan 24, 1919	20 years, 43 days	Albaugh Theater, Baltimore, Maryland, U.S.	
48	Win	40–2–6	Eddie Wimler	PTS	12	Dec 26, 1918	20 years, 14 days	Albaugh Theater, Baltimore, Maryland, U.S.	
47	Win	39–2–6	Frankie Conway	NWS	6	Dec 14, 1918	20 years, 2 days	National A.C., Philadelphia, Pennsylvania, U.S.	
46	Win	38–2–6	Dave Astey	KO	1 (6)	Nov 28, 1918	19 years, 351 days	National A.C., Philadelphia, Pennsylvania, U.S.	
45	Win	37–2–6	Sammy Marino	NWS	6	Nov 15, 1918	19 years, 338 days	Cambria A.C., Philadelphia, Pennsylvania, U.S.	
44	Win	36–2–6	Young Terry McGovern	NWS	6	Nov 6, 1918	19 years, 329 days	Olympia A.C., Philadelphia, Pennsylvania, U.S.	
43	Win	35–2–6	Joe Tuber	NWS	6	Sep 21, 1918	19 years, 283 days	National A.C., Philadelphia, Pennsylvania, U.S.	
42	Draw	34–2–6	Earl Puryear	PTS	10	Sep 16, 1918	19 years, 278 days	La Salle, Illinois, U.S.	
41	Win	34–2–5	Young Joey Mendo	KO	9 (10)	May 6, 1918	19 years, 145 days	Lyric Theater, Baltimore, Maryland, U.S.	
40	Win	33–2–5	Mike Ertle	NWS	10	Apr 30, 1918	19 years, 139 days	Auditorium, Milwaukee, Wisconsin, U.S.	
39	Draw	32–2–5	Andy Chaney	NWS	10	Apr 22, 1918	19 years, 131 days	Lyric Theater, Baltimore, Maryland, U.S.	
38	Loss	32–2–4	Johnny Ertle	NWS	10	Nov 21, 1917	18 years, 344 days	Arcadia Rink, Milwaukee, Wisconsin, U.S.	World bantamweight title claim at stake; (via KO only)
37	Win	32–1–4	Frankie Daly	NWS	10	Nov 10, 1917	18 years, 333 days	Fairmont A.C., New York City, New York, U.S.	
36	Win	31–1–4	Willie Astey	NWS	10	Nov 2, 1917	18 years, 325 days	Harlem S.C., New York City, New York, U.S.	
35	Win	30–1–4	George Thompson	NWS	10	Jul 23, 1917	18 years, 223 days	Lakeside Arena, Racine, Wisconsin, U.S.	
34	Win	29–1–4	Jackie Sharkey	NWS	10	Jun 19, 1917	18 years, 189 days	Pioneer S.C., New York City, New York, U.S.	
33	Win	28–1–4	Frankie Williams	NWS	10	May 31, 1917	18 years, 170 days	Hunts Point A.C., New York City, New York, U.S.	
32	Win	27–1–4	Dutch Brandt	NWS	10	May 26, 1917	18 years, 165 days	Clermont Avenue Rink, New York City, New York, U.S.	
31	Draw	26–1–4	Frankie Clarke	NWS	10	May 21, 1917	18 years, 160 days	Olympia A.C., Philadelphia, Pennsylvania, U.S.	
30	Win	26–1–3	Dutch Brandt	NWS	10	May 5, 1917	18 years, 144 days	Clermont Avenue Rink, New York City, New York, U.S.	
29	Win	25–1–3	Frankie Daly	NWS	10	Mar 22, 1917	18 years, 100 days	Fairmont A.C., New York City, New York, U.S.	
28	Draw	24–1–3	Billy Fitzsimmons	NWS	10	Mar 9, 1917	18 years, 87 days	Harlem S.C., New York City, New York, U.S.	
27	Win	24–1–2	Jimmy Murray	NWS	10	Mar 3, 1917	18 years, 81 days	Clermont Avenue Rink, New York City, New York, U.S.	
26	Win	23–1–2	Billy Fitzsimmons	NWS	10	Feb 22, 1917	18 years, 72 days	Broadway S.C., New York City, New York, U.S.	
25	Win	22–1–2	Johnny Solzberg	NWS	10	Feb 9, 1917	18 years, 59 days	Harlem S.C., New York City, New York, U.S.	
24	Win	21–1–2	Willie Astey	NWS	10	Jan 26, 1917	18 years, 45 days	Harlem S.C., New York City, New York, U.S.	
23	Win	20–1–2	Murray Allen	NWS	10	Jan 15, 1917	18 years, 34 days	Olympic Athletic Club, New York City, New York, U.S.	
22	Win	19–1–2	Happy Smith	NWS	10	Jan 6, 1917	18 years, 25 days	Fairmont A.C., New York City, New York, U.S.	
21	Win	18–1–2	Kid Rash	KO	3 (?)	Dec 29, 1916	18 years, 17 days	Harlem S.C., New York City, New York, U.S.	
20	Win	17–1–2	Kid Rash	NWS	6	Dec 8, 1916	17 years, 362 days	Harlem S.C., New York City, New York, U.S.	
19	Win	16–1–2	Jack Courtney	NWS	10	Nov 4, 1916	17 years, 328 days	Fairmont A.C., New York City, New York, U.S.	
18	Win	15–1–2	Georgie Lewis	KO	2 (?)	Oct 24, 1916	17 years, 317 days	New York City, New York, U.S.	
17	Draw	14–1–2	Frankie Williams	NWS	6	Oct 20, 1916	17 years, 313 days	Harlem S.C., New York City, New York, U.S.	
16	Draw	14–1–1	Jack Tracey	NWS	6	Oct 10, 1916	17 years, 303 days	Hunts Point Casino, New York City, New York, U.S.	
15	Win	14–1	Mike Hogan	TKO	2 (?)	Sep 25, 1916	17 years, 288 days	Clermont Avenue Rink, New York City, New York, U.S.	
14	Win	13–1	Kid McCarthy	KO	1 (?)	Sep 21, 1916	17 years, 284 days	Clermont Avenue Rink, New York City, New York, U.S.	
13	Win	12–1	Frankie Bell	TKO	4 (4)	Sep 16, 1916	17 years, 279 days	Broadway Arena, New York City, New York, U.S.	
12	Win	11–1	Eddie Ryan	KO	1 (?)	Sep 12, 1916	17 years, 275 days	New York City, New York, U.S.	
11	Win	10–1	Jim Roberts	KO	1 (?)	Sep 10, 1916	17 years, 273 days	New York City, New York, U.S.	
10	Win	9–1	Harry Fields	KO	1 (?)	Sep 5, 1916	17 years, 268 days	New York City, New York, U.S.	
9	Win	8–1	Kid Rash	KO	4 (?)	Aug 29, 1916	17 years, 261 days	Harlem S.C., New York City, New York, U.S.	
8	Win	7–1	Bobby Turner	KO	4 (?)	Jul 21, 1916	17 years, 222 days	New Polo A.C., New York City, New York, U.S.	
7	Loss	6–1	Gussie Lewis	PTS	6	Jul 13, 1916	17 years, 214 days	Oriole Park, Baltimore, Maryland, U.S.	
6	Win	6–0	Tommy White	KO	5 (?)	Apr 25, 1916	17 years, 135 days	Argo, Illinois, U.S.	
5	Win	5–0	Young Pope	PTS	4	Apr 15, 1916	17 years, 125 days	Chicago, Illinois, U.S.	
4	Win	4–0	John Fallon	KO	2 (?)	Apr 8, 1916	17 years, 118 days	Chicago, Illinois, U.S.	
3	Win	3–0	Kid Hogan	PTS	6	Mar 30, 1916	17 years, 109 days	Lamont, Illinois, U.S.	
2	Win	2–0	Jimmy Mars	KO	3 (?)	Mar 25, 1916	17 years, 104 days	Argo, Illinois, U.S.	
1	Win	1–0	Young Pope	PTS	4	Dec 3, 1915	16 years, 356 days	Argo, Illinois, U.S.	
