= Oertel =

Oertel is a surname. Notable people with the surname include:

- Brigitte Oertel (born 1953), German fencer
- Chuck Oertel (1931–2000), American baseball player
- F. O. Oertel (1862–1942), German-born British engineer, architect and archaeologist
- Friedrich Meyer-Oertel (born 1936), German opera director
- Horst Oertel (1871–1956), Canadian pathologist
- Johannes Adam Simon Oertel (1823–1909), German-American Episcopal clergyman and artist
- John James Maximilian Oertel (1811-1882), German-American journalist.
- Max Joseph Oertel (1835–1897), German physician
- Rudi Oertel (1926–2009), German diver
- Waldtraut Oertel (1936–2026), German diver

== See also ==
- Ertel
- Ertl
