= Mike McNulty (boxing manager) =

American boxing manager

Mike McNulty (1887–1965) was an old time, old style and old method boxing manager and trainer, who managed and trained several world champion boxers during the first half of the 20th century, including Mike O'Dowd, Johnny Ertel, Mike Gibbons and, also, trained Mike's brother Tommy Gibbons, the Ring Boxing and International Boxing Hall of Fame. In 1965, Mike McNulty died at Studio City Convalescent Hospital in Studio City, California at the age of 78.

"Modern fighters don't know what road work is. Their idea now is 10 or 15 minutes. Phooey! Why I remember when old timers like Tommy Gibbons, Mike O'Dowd and Billy Miske used to run for hours in any kind of weather to strengthen their underpinning and lungs. They would get up early in the morning and ride the street car as far out of St. Paul as they could and then they'd run every step of the way back to the gym. And listen cold weather never bothered those men. On the zero days they'd put on enough clothes to sag these modern fighters to the ground and lug that extra weigh all the way home. Those men were great fighters and were always in condition and long lived in the game. Being in condition and staying that way means everything. These present day boxers - phooey."- Mike McNulty on July 30, 1935

== Mike O’Dowd ==
In 1913, St. Paul, Minnesota's own Mike O’Dowd turned professional under Mike McNulty, whose subsequent training and management of O’Dowd molded him into the undisputed World Middleweight Boxing Champion by 1917. O’Dowd continued to hold this title against all comers (including against Harry Greb, Al McCoy, Kid Lewis and Mike Gibbons to name a few) until 1920 when he lost it to Johnny Wilson on a hotly disputed decision.

== Johnny Ertel ==
Mike McNulty, manager and trainer of Johnny Ertel from his first professional match in 1913 at age 16, was in “Kewpie” or “Little Dynamo” Ertel's corner in St. Paul, Minnesota on September 10, 1915, when Ertel fought Kid Williams and won the World Championship Bantamweight boxing title from the “Kid”. It is reported that after later moving away from McNulty's training and management, Johnny Ertel was not the same fighter.

== See also ==
Jack Dempsey vs. Tommy Gibbons
