= Ertel =

Ertel is a surname originating from South Germany: from a personalized form of a name beginning with Ort-, from Old High German "ort": "point (of a sword or lance)."

Ertel may also mean "Steel Smith."

Ertel may be a derivation of other surnames, including "Ertl" and "Ertle."

This surname of ERTEL has two origins. It was a Provençal occupational name for a gardener or a topographic name for someone who lived near an enclosed garden. The name developed in the Latin form HORTUS via medieval documents. It was also a German name for someone who lived at the top of a hill or the end of a settlement, derived from the Old German word ORT, in the transferred sense “tip” or “extremity.”

The name has numerous variant spellings which include ERTLER, ORT, DELORT, DESHORTS, HUERTA, HORTA, OHRTMAN, VAN OORT, ORTET and ORTEL, to name but a few. Although some have changed the name of a variety of personal reasons, a common form of variation was in fact involuntary, when an official change was made, in other words, a clerical error. Among the lower classes of European society, and especially among less educated people, people were willing to accept the mistakes of officials, clerks, and priests as an official new version of their surname, just as they had meekly accepted the surname they had been born with. In North America, the linguistic problems confronting immigration officials at Ellis Island in the 19th century were legendary as a prolific source of Anglicization.

Notable bearers of this name include:

- Allen E. Ertel (1937–2015), American politician
- Frank Ertel Carlyle (1897–1960), American politician
- Hans Ertel (1904–1971), German scientist
- Julie Ertel (born 1972), American water polo player
- Janet Ertel (1913–1988), American singer and member of The Chordettes
- Mark Ertel (1919–2010), American professional basketball player

== See also ==
- Johnny Ertle (1897–1976), Hungarian-born American boxer
- Oertel
