= Ertl =

Ertl may refer to:

== People ==
- Alayna Ertl (2010–2016), kidnapping and murder victim
- Andreas Ertl (1975–present), German alpine ski racer
- Fritz Ertl (1908–1982), Austrian architect, Bauhaus graduate who helped design the Auschwitz concentration camp; SS member
- Gerhard Ertl (born 1936), the 2007 winner of the Nobel Prize in Chemistry
- Hans Ertl (cameraman) (1908–2000), German cameraman active during the 1930s
- Hans Ertl (ice hockey) (1909– ?), Austrian ice hockey player
- Harald Ertl (1948–1982), Austrian motorsport journalist and driver
- Johannes Ertl (born 1982), Austrian football player
- Josef Ertl (1925–2000), German politician
- Martina Ertl (1973–present), German alpine ski racer
- Monika Ertl (1937–1973), German-born guerrilla fighter in Bolivia
- Roland Ertl (1945–present), Austrian General Inspector of troops of the Austrian Army

== Other uses ==
- Ertl Company, an American toy maker
- Ertl, Lower Austria, a municipality in the Amstetten district of Austria

== See also ==
- Ertel (disambiguation)
- Oertel
