= Johnny Ertle =

American boxer

Personal information
- Nicknames: Kewpie; Little Dynamo
- Nationality: Hungarian-born American
- Born: John Michael Ertl; March 21, 1897 Dunaföldvár, Hungary
- Died: October 15, 1976 (aged 79) Stillwater, Minnesota, US
- Height: 4 ft 11 in (1.50 m)
- Weight: Bantamweight champion Late career featherweight

Boxing career
- Reach: 65 in (1.65 m)

Boxing record
- Total fights: 88* (52 no decisions); Only points decisions shown
- Wins: 20
- Win by KO: 15
- Losses: 12
- Draws: 4
- No contests: 0

Johnny Ertle or Ertel (sometimes spelled Johnne) was a Hungarian born American boxer. Nicknamed "Kewpie" and "Little Dynamo", he was a disputed bantamweight world boxing champion from 1915 until 1918, when he lost the title to Memphis Pal Moore. Trained and managed from 1913, when he was only sixteen, by Mike McNulty, Ertle's body punches were particularly devastating to his opponents, because of the extraordinary leverage he could apply using the extra space provided by his small stature. He was managed by Mike Collins in his later career.

== Early life and career ==
John Michael Ertl was born on March 21, 1897, in Dunaföldvár, Austria-Hungary. His family of at least four children emigrated to America around 1910 when Ertle was around thirteen, and soon settled in St. Paul, Minnesota. Ertle's brother Mike also became a successful boxer. As a youth, Johnny worked shining shoes, and later bought himself a membership to the YMCA where he received his early boxing training. His manager, Mike McNulty claimed Ertle was herding cows to make extra money when he acquired him as a boxer in 1913.

By one account, a key to Ertle's success were his powerful arms and broad 38" chest which comprised a reach that may have been as long as 65 inches, far longer than average for his 4' 11" height. His first pro fight came under the careful watch of his manager, Mike McNulty, on October 31, 1913, in a secret fight card in St. Paul, where he made his home. Since boxing was still illegal in Minnesota at the time, and Johnny was just 16, news of the bout had to be kept quiet. But the lightning fast style and vicious hooks Ertle scored on Joe LaScotte's ribs and jaw aroused public interest. He knocked out LaScotte in the 3rd round and picked up many more local fans, when he did the same to LaScotte in a fourth round rematch the following month. Dedicated to his family, he helped build a new $3000 St. Paul home for his parents in 1915, with the results of his substantial early career winnings.

=== Loss to Memphis Pal Moore, 1915 ===
In a controversial, but important bout on April 6, 1915, Ertle lost to bantamweight great Memphis Pal Moore in Moore's hometown of Memphis in an eight-round newspaper decision. Moore, who enjoyed a six-inch advantage in height, would earn the King's Bantamweight Trophy three years later, and eventually remove any claim to the world bantamweight championship from Ertle in 1918. A few in the audience believed the hometown referee was partial to Moore. In a somewhat close bout, the Racine Journal-News gave Moore five rounds, with three to Ertle and two even. Moore used his advantage in reach and height to hold off Ertle with his left jab followed by right crosses. Ertle's rights and lefts repeatedly fell short due to his disadvantage in reach and Moore's illusiveness. Williams staggered Ertle several times in the fifth, sixth, and seventh rounds, likely turning the final decision in his favor.

==== Wins over bantam champ Eddie Coulon ====
In a bout which announced Ertle's ascendancy as a top bantamweight contender, on May 4, 1915, Ertle fought a ten-round no-decision bout with 1911-14 world bantamweight champion Eddie Coulon, at the Elite Rink in Milwaukee. Impressively, several local papers considered the bout an easy win for the young Ertle, only eighteen at the time. Three months later, Ertle won another newspaper decision at the Auditorium in St. Paul against Coulon before an audience of 3,000. Coulon, one of Ertle's most accomplished opponents, fought several top rated bantamweight including hid childhood friend Pete Herman and Memphis Pal Moore.

== World Bantam champion, September 1915 ==
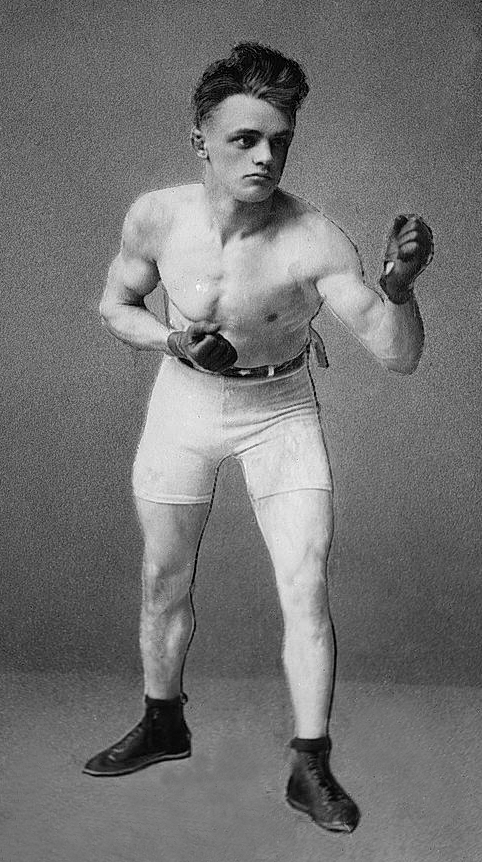
Titlist Kid Williams

With McNulty in his corner, Ertle took the bantamweight title from Kid Williams in a close bout on September 10, 1915, in St. Paul, Minnesota while still just 18 years of age. The first three rounds appeared even, but Williams clearly led in the fourth. At the end of the fourth, Williams was first warned for a low blow after throwing a vicious left uppercut to Ertle's stomach. Williams was disqualified in the middle of the 5th, immediately after throwing a right uppercut to Ertle's midsection that Ertle, the referee, and an examining doctor confirmed was a low blow. Ring side spectators differed as to whether the blow was actually low, though Williams had also been repeatedly warned against throwing elbows. Minnesota law allowed an official decision only in the event of knockouts and disqualifications, making the disqualification a valid reason to award Ertle the win. However, controversy began over whether a disqualification was enough to award Ertle the world bantamweight championship. While many other state commissions recognized Ertle's title, some states with different rules, particularly New York, did not. Williams's clear lead in the fourth round brought many Williams loyalists to the conclusion he had a better claim to the title, though Williams's manager Sam Harris, admitted that at least technically Ertle's win was sound. Harris later disputed that Ertle's win, however, entitled him to the bantamweight title and Williams continued to claim it as his own.

One of Ertle's first defenses of his claim to the title came against Abe Friedman, who he defeated in a ten-round newspaper decision in Brooklyn, New York a month after his title win, on November 8, 1915.

In another early career victory, Ertle defeated Johnny Solzberg in a very close ten-round newspaper decision at the Clermont Avenue Rink in Brooklyn. To have lost the title, Ertle would have to have been knocked out by Solzberg. The bout was billed as a defense of his world bantamweight title, and the Pittsburgh Gazette Times wrote that Ertle's aggressiveness and speed won him the decision. The New York Tribune wrote that Solzberg landed the most blows, but that Ertle's were more powerful.

Ertle defended his claim to the title in December 1915, with knockouts against Young O'Leary and Young Freddie Diggins, though neither became well known contenders.

In what was billed as a defense of his world bantamweight title, Ertle defeated Jack Sayles in a ten-round newspaper decision. Ertle, who claimed he was ill the week before but felt better the day of the fight, won easily, but nearly half his blows were dodged or ducked by the clever and quick Sayles. In a convincing win, the Brooklyn Daily Eagle gave Ertle all but the third round.

On February 9, 1916, Ertle successfully defended his world bantamweight title against Italian boxer Terry Martin in a ten-round newspaper decision of the New York Times at the Clermont Skating Rink in Brooklyn. Ertle fought in his typical slam bang style, and landed so frequently on Martin in the first three rounds that it looked as if he would put an end to the bout, but Martin recovered and made it to the end with an improved defense. Ertle used a faster pace, led almost throughout, and scored heavily with left uppercuts to the jaw and right hand smashes under the heart. He held a significant advantage in the points scoring and Martin suffered badly near the closing bell despite a significant advantage in height and possibly reach.

Erle defeated Philadelphian Joe Tuber on Valentine's Day 1916, in a six-round newspaper decision at the Olympia Club in Tuber's home town. A formidable early opponent, Tuber would box the best bantamweights of his era. As was his custom, Ertle took the offense for all but a few exchanges in the first round, fighting Tuber all over the ring and leading with his strong signature left and right hooks to body and jaw. Tuber put up a good defense, backing away from several blows, blocking a few, and eluding a few that missed, but still receiving enough to be on the short end of the points scoring. In the one sided affair, Tuber was forced to cover up and clinch to last the full six rounds and avoid a knockout.

Before a crowd of 3000, Ertle drew with Al Shubert, a future New England Featherweight and Bantamweight contender, on February 22, 1916, in a twelve-round bout in New Bedford, Massachusetts. Shubert forced the fighting in the early rounds, but was unable to gain a significant margin in points in a close bout that featured no knockdowns and in which Ertle's claim to the title was as stake. In the later rounds, Ertle grew stronger, and scored lightly or held Shubert even often enough to justify a draw ruling. Ertle threw more punches at great speed as the fight progressed securing the draw decision.

=== Win over "Young Zulu Kid", 1916 ===
Johnny Ertle

On March 14, 1916, Ertle defeated future contender for both the American and world flyweight titles, Italian boxer Young Zulu Kid, in a ten-round newspaper decision at the Broadway Gym in Brooklyn. In the eighth, Ertle broke away and battered the Kid with blows to the jaw and body with almost no return, and in the ninth and tenth, he continued to build a strong lead in points scoring. In an atypical match, both boxers were only 4' 11" in height, though Ertle held a seven-pound weight advantage and likely a reach advantage as well, which he used to help secure his world bantamweight claim.

On September 4, 1916, Ertle lost to Jewish boxer Benny Kaufman in a newspaper decision at the Olympia Club in Philadelphia. After a harsh right to the jaw in the first, Ertle went on the defensive for several rounds until the fourth when he went into a rally. In that round, Kaufman quickly recovered and continued to take the aggressive, winning the subsequent two rounds easily on points. Ertle did not display his characteristic energy in the bout after his harsh treatment in the first. One reporter gave Kaufman every round including the fourth.

=== Draw with Joe Lynch, 1916 ===
Ertle drew with future world bantamweight champion Joe Lynch on October 10, 1916, in a close no decision bout in a ten-round newspaper decision at the Pioneer Club in Brooklyn. Ertle held a lead in the first two rounds, but Lynch rallied and by waging a two fisted attack came back on points scoring. Ertle went out into the lead again in the seventh with several successive blows, but Lynch came back to even the scoring. Despite a disadvantage in reach, with Lynch seven inches taller, Ertle performed well against the future champion.

On November 27, 1916, Ertle fought another no-decision bout against Dick Loadman at the Lyric Theatre in Baltimore, losing in the opinion of many newspapers, but Ertle did not give up his claim to the title. Though there were no knockdowns in the bout, Loadman showered Ertle with blows against which his opponent could find no consistent defense. The bout was well fought and the first five rounds featured scientific sparring and footwork. Minneapolis's Morning Tribune could not give a single round to Ertle, and noted he was forced to cover through much of the fighting. Loadman would fight top talent in his career, but usually lose against past or future champions.

On February 16, 1917, Ertle defeated Pekin Kid Herman, of Pekin, Illinois, in a close ten-round newspaper decision at the Auditorium in Milwaukee. Several newspapers, however, considered the bout a draw, or a close win by Herman, who gained momentum in the last four rounds, rocking Ertle with lefts and rights in the seventh and eighth, though still taking punishment in both rounds. The Milwaukee Free Press gave the bout to Ertle for his slight lead in the first six rounds, and for briefly putting Herman to the canvas in the second with a right uppercut to the chin.

Before a crowd of 3,000, on July 31, 1917, Ertle defeated Irish bantamweight Roy Moore at St. Paul's Lexington Park in no-decision bout that most newspapers ruled a draw or a slight edge for Ertle. The bout was billed as a defense of Ertle's world bantamweight title. Moore performed well in the eighth, ninth, and tenth rounds, deserving a draw or having a slight edge in the opinion of Minneapolis's Morning Tribune. In the opinion of several newspapers, Ertle deserved the decision for landing cleaner blows. Two months later on September 11, Ertle defeated Moore in a ten-round no-decision bout, which he won in the opinion of the Chicago Tribune. The Des-Moines Register gave Ertle seven of the ten rounds, with three even, and not a single round to Moore.

==== Close bout with Jack Kid Wolfe, 1917 ====
Ertle met 1922 world junior featherweight champion, Jack "Kid" Wolfe in a benefit to raise athletic equipment for local soldiers on December 7, 1917, in a close ten-round newspaper decision in Cleveland, Ohio. Ertle lost the battle at long range where Wolfe excelled. Though Wolfe landed more blows, winning on points, Ertle, the stronger boxer, landed the more telling blows. The great majority of newspapers gave the decision to Wolfe, giving Wolfe five rounds, Ertle two, and three even.

=== Kid Williams rematch, 1917 ===
Ertle drew with Kid Williams on December 17, 1917, in an important twelve round rematch at the Lyric Theatre in Baltimore. Ertle sent Williams to the mat in the second round for a count of eight with a strong right hook to the jaw, and when he arose he was sent down again with a volley of lefts and rights to the jaw. After the fifth, Williams took the aggressive stance and landed more blows, evening the points scoring. The Baltimore Sun believed Ertle may have deserved the decision by a shade as he scored three knockdowns in the second, and in their opinion took eight of the twelve rounds, allowing Williams to outpoint him in only the eighth, ninth and tenth. After losing claim to the bantamweight title, Ertle lost to Williams decisively in their last meeting on August 13, 1920, in a twelve-round points decision in Baltimore. Ertle was close to being knocked out many times, but Williams was unable to finish him.

== Loss Bantam title, April, 1918 ==
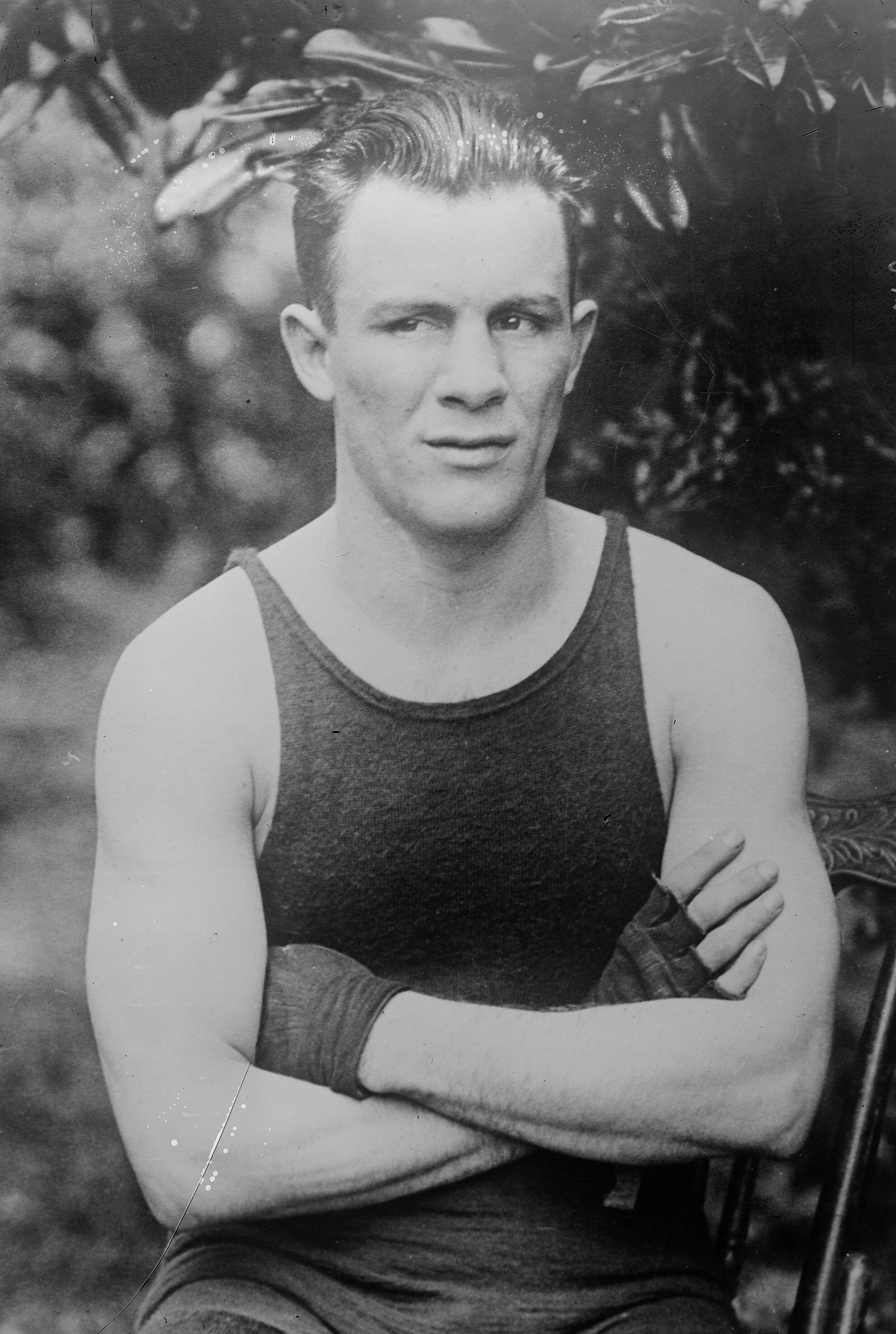
Memphis Pal Moore

Ertle clearly forfeited all claims to the world bantamweight title on April 10, 1918, when he lost to Memphis Pal Moore in a fifteen-round points decision before a large crowd at the Lyric Theater in Baltimore. In a decisive victory by Moore, the Baltimore Sun wrote that except for close fighting in the second, eighth, and ninth, Moore outboxed and outpunched Ertle in the remaining twelve rounds. He dominated with his left, keeping Ertle away and beating him back from effective counterpunches. Though Ertle repeatedly took the aggressive stance, Moore used his superior reach to throw the more effective blows each time Ertel got close. Showing greater speed with his illusive bobs of the head and body, Moore evaded the blows of Ertel repeatedly, attacking frequently with his longer right to Ertle's jaw. Moore claimed the bantamweight title after the bout, but his claim was never universally recognized.

=== Second loss by knockout, November 1918 ===
In a disappointing loss on November 9, 1918, Frankie Burns, a top bantamweight contender, knocked out Ertle in the seventh round in Weehawken, New Jersey. Burns, with an advantage in both reach and height, easily wore down Ertle throughout the bout. The New York Sun wrote that Burns had the upperhand from beginning to end with Ertle unable to land more than a half dozen solid blows. Burns's straight lefts to the head kept Ertle's head bobbing, and even in close in fighting, Burns dominated with blows to the body that forced Ertle to clinch. With a fusillade of right and lefts, Burns toppled Ertle into the ropes 1:15 into the seventh round. Having fallen to the canvas, Ertle was just able to rise on his knees after a count of five. As he swayed on his knees his seconds threw in the towel, realizing he should not continue the fight. Burns was a formidable opponent, with boxing journalist Nat Fleischer once rating him the eighth greatest bantamweight of all time, but the loss changed the direction of Ertle's career. With his second knockout in only six months, little hope of his taking the championship remained.

Ertle defeated Frankie Daly on points on April 18, 1919, in a rare twelve round points decision at the Albaugh Theater in Baltimore. Enjoying a comfortable margin on points, the Baltimore Sun gave Ertle six rounds, with only two to Daly and four even. There was only one brief knockdown when Ertle scored with a right to the chin. Ertle showed best in his powerful left and right hooks, though he also dealt effective uppercuts to the body in close, and his rapid fire shots to the body were strong and effective. In an action filled bout, both boxers took punishment, but Ertle's blows were more accurate and showed considerably more power.

=== Loss to bantam champ Pete Herman, 1919 ===
Champion Pete Herman

One of Ertle's most accomplished bantamweight opponents was Pete "Kid" Herman, reigning world bantamweight champion, whom he lost to in a fifth-round technical knockout in Minneapolis on May 23, 1919. According to a few boxing historians, including Ertle's manager Mike McNulty, Etle's actual loss of the title did not occur until his loss to Herman, a reigning champion. Herman was rated as the second greatest bantamweight in history by sports writer Nat Fleischer, and was a 1997 inductee to the International Boxing Hall of Fame. The world bantamweight championship was technically at stake, but according to Minnesota law, Ertle would have had to knock out Herman or win by a disqualification to take the title from him. The close bout was stopped because of Ertle's cut eye, but the Minneapolis Tribune wrote that he had at least a small margin on points until the fourth round. In the fourth, however, Herman sent Ertle to the canvas with a right cross for a count of four. Another right cross put Ertle to the canvas before the bell interrupted a count of nine. Only a few seconds into the fifth, Herman put Ertle down again with a right cross, and the referee called the match.

Ertle lost to American flyweight champion contender Frankie Mason on June 20, 1919, in a ten-round newspaper decision in Grand Rapids, Michigan. Mason landed more clean blows, and demonstrated better ring craft than Ertle. On August 11, 1919, Ertle lost to Mason in a fifteen-round points decision at Oriole Park in Baltimore. In the opening rounds, Mason used a well-directed left jab to ward off the advances of Ertle. In the fifth, sixth, and seventh, Mason caught Ertle against the ropes in neutral corners and delivered blows without much return. Losing badly by the tenth, Ertle put up little resistance. In the fifteenth, Ertle suffered badly and took blows repeatedly, unable to defend himself.

After his loss of any championship claim to Memphis Pal Moore, Ertle moved away from his manager Mike McNulty and his career suffered. Many of the opponents selected by his new management were too skilled for Ertle, and his record suffered particularly in 1919–20.

After his bouts with Mason, Ertle attempted to retire from boxing. On April 27, 1920, he married Augusta Winkey and moved to a farm near Watertown, Minnesota. In Watertown, Ertle tried to make a living farming, but returned to the ring after the birth of his daughter, Marie. Around 1922, Ertle and his wife moved to Stillwater, Minnesota, where he remained the rest of his life.

=== Loss to Kid Williams, boxing decline, 1920 ===
Kid Williams spoiled Ertle's comeback in a decisive twelve round victory on August 13, 1920, at Oriole Park in Baltimore. Before a record open air crowd, Williams brought a staggering Ertle close to a knockout at least a half dozen times, though the diminutive St. Paul boxer remained on his feet. Ertle was down in the third from an uppercut from Williams, and was badly battered about the face and eyes by the end of the twelfth. His match with his nemesis had been postponed five times before finally taking place.

After his marriage and his brief retirement from boxing in 1919, Ertle met Joey Schwartz in a ten-round draw bout on points on March 17, 1922, at the Armories in Windsor, Ontario, Canada. A Detroit paper noted "Ertle, who is only 24 years old, beat all of the American and foreign bantams in 1918 and 1919. His height, four foot, 11 inches and his aggressive style made him a great favorite with fight fans everywhere." The spirited bout was close and judges disagreed on who held the most points, so the referee was required to secure the draw decision.

Fighting as a featherweight on January 26, 1923, he showed a few glimpses of his old form and convincingly defeated Saph McKenna in a ten-round newspaper decision, the night's main event at the Auditorium in St. Paul. Though his Stillwater fans cheered him, even his hometown papers were critical of his performance. The Minneapolis Marning Tribune gave six of the ten rounds to Ertle with only one to McKenna, and admitted he easily outpointed his opponent, but noted that he appeared slow compared to the championship form of five years earlier. McKenna was considered off form, using his height and reach advantage to fight at long range, though he looked awkward and missed with many of his blows. Ertle may have had McKenna close to a knockout in several rounds, but was unable to deliver a final blow. He recovered well from a strong blow to the face in the third that had him dazed and groggy, but he lacked the speed of his former days and though they landed with frequency, he had less sting and accuracy in his blows.

In one of his last bouts on May 7, 1923, Ertle lost to Carl Tremaine in a ten-round points decision at Ontario's Windsor Armory. Remaining in front in the first five rounds, Tremaine built a strong lead in points using his greater reach and speed to his advantage. In the sixth, Tremaine scored with a left hook to the jaw, but Ertle quickly recovered and continued to score points in the remaining rounds.

In his last convincing win on April 5, 1923, Ertle scored a twelve-round newspaper decision over Johnny Andrews, at the Coliseum in Toledo, Ohio. Ertle scored knockdowns in the first, second, and eighth rounds. The first two knockdowns came from right crosses, and led to long counts of nine.

== Life after boxing ==
In 1916, Ertle was featured playing himself in a short documentary film, Selig Athletic Film Series Feature #4 with two prominent wrestlers, and Jewish boxer and one time opponent Joe Burman. The film was produced by William Nicholas Selig.

After retiring from boxing in 1924, he ran a pool and billiard hall in downtown Stillwater, Minnesota which also included a gymnasium. Not quite a suburb of St. Paul, his former hometown, Stillwater was twenty miles northeast of the city. Later the billiards hall, which he ran with his boxing brother Mike, became Ertle Brothers Tavern on South Main in Stillwater. In 1938, he was reported to be running a lunch counter there, and was tipping the scales at a little over 200 pounds.

Ertle remained active in the Stillwater community, performing civic work with both the Eagles and Elks Clubs. He was comfortable financially maintaining real estate investments in St. Paul, while still holding ownership in his Watertown farm and Stillwater tavern.

His weight led to a heart attack around April 1956.

Having first moved there in 1922, Ertle died in Stillwater on October 15, 1976. His wife Augusta, with whom he had two children, Marie and John Jr., died in 1971.

== Primary boxing achievements and honors ==
Achievements
Previous: Kid Williams	World Bantamweight Champion (Disputed); September 10, 1915 – May 23, 1919 (Loss to Moore, later Herman)	Succeeded by Pete "Kid" Herman

He was inducted into the Minnesota Boxing Hall of Fame in 2011.
