= Rudi Oertel =

German diver (1926–2009)

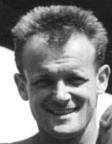
- Oertel in 1960

Personal information
- Born: 4 December 1926 Gera, Germany
- Died: 10 May 2009 (aged 82) Gera, Germany
- Height: 1.68 m (5 ft 6 in)
- Weight: 68 kg (150 lb)
- Spouse: Waldtraut Skrzipek (m. 1954)

Sport
- Sport: Diving
- Club: SC Wismut Karl-Marx-Stadt

Rudolf "Rudi" Oertel (4 December 1926 – 10 May 2009) was a German diver. He competed in the springboard at the 1960 Summer Olympics and finished in 11th place. Around late 1954 he married Waldtraut Skrzipek, a German diver who also competed at the 1960 Olympics in the springboard.
