= Kid Williams =

Polish American boxer

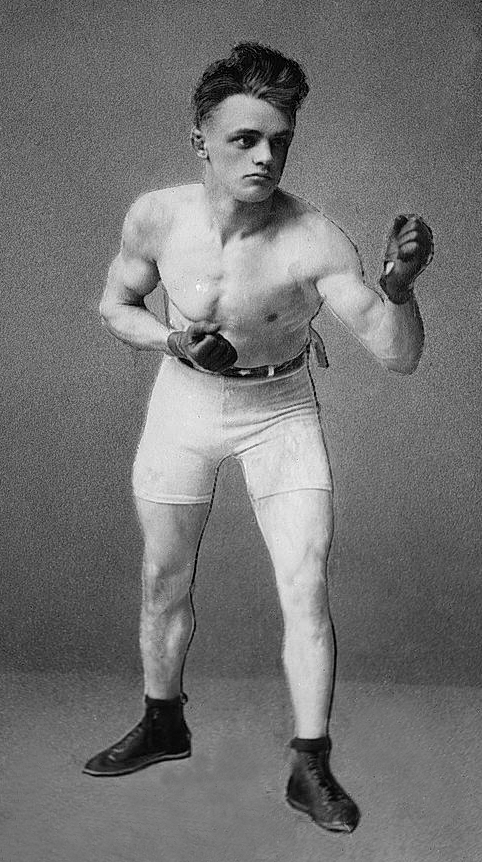

Personal information
- Nickname: The Baltimore Tiger
- Nationality: American
- Born: John Gutenko; December 1, 1893 Rahó, Máramaros, Austro-Hungarian Empire (nowadays Ukraine)
- Died: October 18, 1963 (aged 69) Baltimore, Maryland, U.S.
- Weight: Bantamweight

Boxing career
- Stance: Orthodox

Boxing record
- Total fights: 207
- Wins: 162
- Win by KO: 50
- Losses: 30
- Draws: 12
- No contests: 3

John Gutenko (December 1, 1893 – October 18, 1963) was an Austro-Hungarian-born American boxer of Danish, Ukrainian and Polish heritage who fought under the name Kid Williams and was known as the Baltimore Tiger. He knocked out Johnny Coulon in Vernon, California, on June 9, 1914. This victory earned him the Bantamweight Championship world title. In 1970, Johnny Gutenko was inducted into The Ring magazine’s Boxing Hall of Fame after being nominated “by the sports editors, boxing writers, and television sportscasters.” At the time, the magazine’s founder Nat Fleischer ranked him number three among bantamweights. However, the website AinsworthSports.com rated him number one for the 1910 decade. Over twenty years later, he would be inducted into the International Boxing Hall of Fame. Coincidentally, the ceremony occurred in Canastota, New York, on June 9, 1996, the 82nd anniversary of him winning the bantamweight title.

== Biography ==
John Gutenko was born at Rahó, Máramaros, Austria-Hungary (today part of Western Ukraine). Along with his mother, Aniela (born in Barkhagen, German Empire, on November 7, 1876 – August 23, 1939), and his two brothers (Ludwik "Louis" and Rudolph) and two sisters (Bertha and Helen), they arrived in Baltimore on September 28, 1904, aboard the SS Breslau. John’s father, Wincenty Gutenko (born in Copenhagen, Denmark, on May 4, 1866 – October 15, 1925), had immigrated earlier in the year. Wincenty arrived in New York before moving to Baltimore, where a large Polish Galician Community was located in the Fells’ Point neighborhood in southeast Baltimore City. Three more children were born in Baltimore: Zygmunt (Sigmund), born on June 27, 1905; Paulina Rita (Lena), born on August 28, 1908; and Elizabeth, born on August 23, 1910. The family worshipped at the Polish Roman Catholic Church of Our Lady of the Holy Rosary. There, he met his wife Agnieszka (Agnes) Zwiaskowska/Wiaskowska (died January 8, 1971). They were married on May 23, 1916. They had two daughters-Katherine born February 8, 1919, and Rosalie Jeanette Gutenko, born April 21, 1927. He died at his daughter’s home on Payson Street, Baltimore City, Maryland, on October 18, 1963. After a Requiem Mass at Holy Rosary Church, he was buried in the Gutenko Family Plot at Holy Rosary Cemetery.

By 1928, the boxer “who a few years ago was idolized by ring followers” was ‘practically penniless’ [and] not many years ago [he] had a fortune of $300,000, made out of the ring, and some investments. Now he is broke, and his fighting days are over.” Before he began his boxing career, Gutenko had left school after the third grade and worked as an apprentice typesetter. Possibly for one of the Baltimore Polish-language or German newspapers. After losing the title in 1917, he returned to typesetting but left to pursue his boxing career again. After he quit boxing, he would work for Bethlehem Steel in Sparrows Point, Maryland. During World War II, he was featured along with other workers promoting their efforts on behalf of the War.

== Professional boxing record ==
John Gutnko's boxing career began on July 25, 1910, with a knockout win that started a meteoric rise and the race to win the bantamweight title. The latter was achieved because of his second manager Sammy Harris. It was Sammy Harris who, to garner publicity about his protégé John Gutenko reinvented and created a myth about themselves that the writers and fans were willing to accept since it made for good press. The most often repeated tale involved how Harris “discovered” the future bantamweight champion. At Harris’s prompting, Guntenko often told reporters: I sold him a paper, and he gave me half a dollar to get changed. I ran away with the half dollar. The next time Harris saw me, he took me up to his athletic club to box. He wanted to see me get licked for stealing his half dollar. But I didn’t get licked. And Harris kept me and trained me, and he made me a champion.

It made for an excellent newspaper copy but was a complete fabrication. Gutenko did not sign with Harris until almost a year after he began his boxing career. Another more plausible explanation was offered by Gutenko a year before his death. In the interview, he told John Sherwood, an Evening Sun writer, that he first put on boxing gloves in the empty stock room of Tom the Greek’s candy store on Eastern Avenue in Baltimore’s Fells’ Point.

Gutenko’s boxing career was initially managed by local boxing promoter Joe Barrett who arranged for his first match at the Oriole Baseball Park against Shep Ferren. A right-handed punch to Farren’s jaw sent the boxer to the canvas and gave the novice his first win.

His loss by knockout against George Henry Chaney, born in Baltimore on September 18, 1892, occurred at Baltimore’s Germania Maennerchor Hall on January 2, 1911, eventually leading to him becoming the protégé of promoter and manager Sammy Harris. Under Harris’ tutelage, he began an impressive winning streak. Then, on October 12, 1912, he met the reigning Bantamweight title holder, Johnny Coulon, at Madison Square Garden. Much to everyone’s disbelief, he fought the champion to a standstill. “Some of the ringside sharps gave the Kid the shade, and all agreed that the Baltimore lad was entitled to a draw at the worst.” The Polish boxer spent the next year and a half trying to force Coulon to a rematch. Although Coulon only fought three bouts during this time, Gutenko continued to take on worthy opponents, including the English (Johnny Hughes) and French (Charles LeDoux) bantamweight champions.

Finally, when an influential Californian boxing promoter, Tom McCarey, declared Gutenko the bantamweight champion after Coulon repeatedly failed to defend the title, Coulon was forced to step into the ring. Unfortunately, it appears Coulon was right to avoid a rematch as Gutenko knocked him out and became the Bantamweight Champion of the World.

John Gutenko gave several versions of how he acquired the fighting name “Kid Williams.” One of the most details suggests the name came from a Baltimore African American bantamweight boxer who encouraged Gutenko to assume his fighting moniker the night before a fight:

He hunted up his pal that night in order to obtain a line on the game. His friend’s name was Williams. Friend Williams was a regular prizefighter – regular in licking he received. He had just quit the game on that account. Still, Jonathan Gutenko (called ‘Dutch’). That name will never do. They puzzled away until Williams abruptly ended it by exclaiming: ‘Why not use mine? Williams? Sure!'

His nickname the Baltimore Tiger was coined by members of the New York sportswriter fraternity. It may have been former gunslinger turned sportswriter Bat Materson who came up with the moniker as he described Gutenko's aggressive boxing style as like that of a tiger.

Ironically, John Gutenko’s first fight after winning the bantamweight title was against Pete Herman in New Orleans. Unfortunately, the Baltimore Tiger would lose his title three years later to Herman in New Orleans on January 9, 1917. They had met the year before, where Gutenko prevailed, but the third time was not the charm, and he lost by being outpointed. Gutenko never recaptured the title, and on September 9, 1929, the Maryland State Athletic Commission “decided for the best interests of everyone concerned, including Williams himself, that the Kid would not be allowed to fight anymore in the State.” The action was taken because “the members of the ring body felt that there was danger of the veteran fight suffering serious injury if allowed to continue.” Thus, revoking his license and ending his boxing career.

After his death, the boxing world began to acknowledge his “great natural ability as a fighter.” On December 3, 1966, his brother Rudolph (February 18, 1900 – August 6, 1969), a Maryland bicycling champion in the 1920s, represented him when the Baltimore Tiger was elected to the Maryland Athletic Sports Hall of Fame. The plaque awarded him was later hung “on the Baltimore Civic Center wall.”

John Gutenko was not the only member of the family to aspire to a boxing career. His younger brother Louis (September 28, 1895 – June 17, 1961) also began his career in 1910 as a lightweight. He remained in his brother’s shadow fighting under the name Young Kid Williams. However, he never achieved fame or a title like his older brother.

All information in this section is derived from BoxRec, unless otherwise stated.

=== Official record ===
207 fights	100 wins	19 losses
By knockout	50	5
By decision	42	9
By disqualification	8	5
Draws	8	
No contests	3	
Newspaper decisions/draws	77	

All newspaper decisions are officially regarded as “no decision” bouts and are not counted to the win/loss/draw column.

No.	Result	Record	Opponent	Type	Round, time	Date	Age	Location	Notes
207	Loss	100–19–8 (80)	Bobby Burns	TKO	2 (8)	Sep 3, 1929	35 years, 272 days	Carlin's Park, Baltimore, Maryland, US	
206	Win	100–18–8 (80)	Frankie Garcia	PTS	8	Jul 12, 1929	35 years, 219 days	Greensboro A.C., Greensboro, Maryland, US	
205	Loss	99–18–8 (80)	Joe Belmont	PTS	8	Apr 9, 1929	35 years, 125 days	Armory, Hagerstown, Maryland, US	
204	Loss	99–17–8 (80)	Sid Lampe	PTS	10	Mar 6, 1929	35 years, 91 days	104th Regiment Armory, Baltimore, Maryland, US	
203	Win	99–16–8 (80)	Sid Lampe	DQ	8 (12)	Feb 11, 1929	35 years, 68 days	104th Regiment Armory, Baltimore, Maryland, US	
202	Win	98–16–8 (80)	Bobby Garcia	PTS	10	Jan 14, 1929	35 years, 40 days	104th Regiment Armory, Baltimore, Maryland, US	
201	Win	97–16–8 (80)	Lou Guglielmini	PTS	8	Dec 27, 1928	35 years, 22 days	Armory, Hagerstown, Maryland, US	
200	Win	96–16–8 (80)	Willie Parrish	TKO	5 (10)	Dec 14, 1928	35 years, 9 days	104th Medical Regiment Armory, Baltimore, Maryland, US	
199	Win	95–16–8 (80)	Joe Caniano	PTS	8	Dec 7, 1928	35 years, 2 days	National Guard Armory, Centreville, Maryland, US	
198	Win	94–16–8 (80)	Eddie Bowling	PTS	8	Nov 29, 1928	34 years, 360 days	St. Stanislaus Hall, Baltimore, Maryland, US	
197	Win	93–16–8 (80)	Joe Caniano	PTS	8	Oct 26, 1928	34 years, 326 days	National Guard Armory, Centreville, Florida, US	
196	Win	92–16–8 (80)	Lou Guglielmini	PTS	8	Sep 28, 1928	34 years, 298 days	Riverview Park, Baltimore, Maryland, US	
195	Win	91–16–8 (80)	Jack Daly	PTS	8	Sep 7, 1928	34 years, 277 days	Riverview Park, Baltimore, Maryland, US	
194	Draw	90–16–8 (80)	Tony Ross	PTS	12	Aug 27, 1928	34 years, 266 days	Maryland Baseball Park, Baltimore, Maryland, US	
193	Win	90–16–7 (80)	Young Joe O'Donnell	PTS	8	Aug 8, 1928	34 years, 247 days	Location unknown	
192	Loss	89–16–7 (80)	Eddie Buell	TKO	4 (8)	Jul 19, 1928	34 years, 227 days	Riverview Park, Baltimore, Maryland, US	
191	Win	89–15–7 (80)	Jimmy Hogan	PTS	3	Jul 15, 1927	33 years, 222 days	5th Regiment Armory, Baltimore, Maryland, US	
190	Win	88–15–7 (80)	Jack Skinner	KO	3 (8)	Feb 25, 1927	33 years, 82 days	St. Stanislaus Hall, Baltimore, Maryland, US	
189	Loss	87–15–7 (80)	Battling Mack	NWS	10	Mar 19, 1926	32 years, 104 days	Convention Hall, Camden, New Jersey, US	
188	Win	87–15–7 (79)	Al Monahan	PTS	10	Mar 5, 1926	32 years, 90 days	Cambria A.C., Philadelphia, Pennsylvania, US	
187	NC	86–15–7 (79)	Billy Pimpus	NC	3 (8)	Feb 8, 1926	32 years, 65 days	Waltz Dream Arena, Atlantic City, New Jersey, US	Cut from accidental headbutt
186	Loss	86–15–7 (78)	Nate Carp	DQ	11 (12)	Jan 4, 1926	32 years, 30 days	104th Regiment Armory, Baltimore, Maryland, US	
185	Win	86–14–7 (78)	Jackie West	PTS	10	Dec 28, 1925	32 years, 23 days	Arcade, Washington, D.C., US	
184	Draw	85–14–7 (78)	Jackie West	PTS	10	Oct 2, 1925	31 years, 301 days	Grime's Battery Armory, Norfolk, Virginia, US	
183	Win	85–14–6 (78)	Midget Smith	DQ	7 (12)	Sep 28, 1925	31 years, 297 days	104th Regiment Armory, Baltimore, Maryland, US	
182	Win	84–14–6 (78)	Red Leonard	PTS	10	Sep 4, 1925	31 years, 273 days	Grime's Battery Armory, Norfolk, Virginia, US	
181	Win	83–14–6 (78)	Midget Smith	PTS	12	Aug 21, 1925	31 years, 259 days	Carlin's Park, Baltimore, Maryland, US	
180	Loss	82–14–6 (78)	Frankie Genaro	PTS	12	Jun 26, 1925	31 years, 203 days	Carlin's Park, Baltimore, Maryland, US	
179	Win	82–13–6 (78)	Terry McHugh	DQ	3 (10)	Apr 24, 1925	31 years, 140 days	Charlton's Hall, Pottsville, Pennsylvania, US	McHugh DQ'd for low blows
178	Draw	81–13–6 (78)	Lew Mayrs	PTS	12	Apr 20, 1925	31 years, 136 days	104th Regiment Armory, Baltimore, Maryland, US	
177	Win	81–13–5 (78)	Al Monahan	NW	8	Feb 9, 1925	31 years, 66 days	Waltz Dream Arena, Atlantic City, New Jersey, US	
176	Win	81–13–5 (77)	Jackie West	NWS	8	Jan 19, 1925	31 years, 45 days	Waltz Dream Arena, Atlantic City, New Jersey, US	
175	Win	81–13–5 (76)	Joey Schwartz	PTS	12	Dec 29, 1924	31 years, 24 days	104th Regiment Armory, Baltimore, Maryland, US	
174	Win	80–13–5 (76)	Al Markie	PTS	10	Apr 5, 1924	30 years, 122 days	108th Field Artillery Armory, Philadelphia, Pennsylvania, US	
173	Loss	79–13–5 (76)	Abe Friedman	DQ	8 (12)	Feb 27, 1924	30 years, 84 days	Marieville Gardens, North Providence, Rhode Island, US	Williams DQ'd for a kidney blow and blow to the back of the head
172	Win	79–12–5 (76)	Young Montreal	PTS	10	Feb 6, 1924	30 years, 63 days	Providence, Rhode Island, US	
171	Win	78–12–5 (76)	Charley Goodman	PTS	12	Jan 14, 1924	30 years, 40 days	Broadway Arena, New York City, New York, US	
170	Win	77–12–5 (76)	Midget Smith	PTS	12	Jan 1, 1924	30 years, 27 days	Rink S.C., New York City, New York, US	
169	Win	76–12–5 (76)	Danny Lee	KO	1 (12), 1:20	Dec 22, 1923	30 years, 17 days	Commonwealth Sporting Club, New York City, New York, US	
168	Win	75–12–5 (76)	Ludger Kid Dube	NWS	6	Dec 12, 1923	30 years, 7 days	Waterville, Maine, US	
167	Loss	75–12–5 (75)	Charley Holman	DQ	9 (12)	Oct 24, 1923	29 years, 323 days	Gayety Theater, Baltimore, Maryland, US	Williams DQ'd for a kidney blow
166	Win	75–11–5 (75)	Frankie Daly	PTS	12	Sep 26, 1923	29 years, 295 days	Gayety Theater, Baltimore, Maryland, US	
165	Loss	74–11–5 (75)	Pancho Villa	NWS	8	Jul 31, 1923	29 years, 238 days	Shetzline Ballpark, Philadelphia, Pennsylvania, US	
164	Win	74–11–5 (74)	Bud Dempsey	PTS	12	Jul 13, 1923	29 years, 220 days	Steeplechase A.A., New York City, New York, US	
163	Loss	73–11–5 (74)	Bobby Garcia	PTS	12	Apr 25, 1923	29 years, 141 days	Gayety Theater, Baltimore, Maryland, US	
162	Win	73–10–5 (74)	Battling Mack	NWS	8	Apr 16, 1923	29 years, 132 days	Arena, Philadelphia, Pennsylvania, US	
161	Loss	73–10–5 (73)	Bobby Garcia	DQ	9 (12)	Apr 4, 1923	29 years, 120 days	Gayety Theater, Baltimore, Maryland, US	
160	Win	73–9–5 (73)	Sammy Sandow	PTS	12	Mar 12, 1923	29 years, 97 days	4th Regiment Armory, Baltimore, Maryland, US	
159	Win	72–9–5 (73)	Young Montreal	PTS	12	Jan 15, 1923	29 years, 41 days	4th Regiment Armory, Baltimore, Maryland, US	
158	Win	71–9–5 (73)	Battling Harry Leonard	DQ	1 (12), 2:24	Dec 22, 1922	29 years, 17 days	Madison Square Garden, New York City, New York, US	Leonard DQ'd for a low blow
157	Win	70–9–5 (73)	Eddie O'Dowd	DQ	9 (10)	Nov 24, 1922	28 years, 354 days	Infantry Hall, Providence, Rhode Island, US	
156	Win	69–9–5 (73)	Roy Moore	TKO	11 (12)	Sep 18, 1922	28 years, 287 days	4th Regiment Armory, Baltimore, Maryland, US	
155	Win	68–9–5 (73)	Joe Dundee	DQ	10 (12)	Sep 4, 1922	28 years, 273 days	4th Regiment Armory, Baltimore, Maryland, US	
154	Win	67–9–5 (73)	Joe Mandell	DQ	6 (?)	Jul 8, 1922	28 years, 215 days	Ridgewood Grove S.C., New York City, New York, US	
153	Draw	66–9–5 (73)	Terry Martin	PTS	12	Feb 15, 1922	28 years, 72 days	Marieville Gardens, North Providence, Rhode Island, US	
152	Win	66–9–4 (73)	Jimmy Mendo	NWS	8	Oct 18, 1921	27 years, 317 days	Armory, Reading, Pennsylvania, US	
151	Win	66–9–4 (72)	Mickey Brown	PTS	12	Oct 13, 1921	27 years, 312 days	Broadway Arena, New York City, New York, US	
150	Loss	65–9–4 (72)	Andy Chaney	PTS	10	Oct 4, 1921	27 years, 303 days	Mechanics Building, Boston, Massachusetts, US	
149	Win	65–8–4 (72)	Louisiana	NWS	8	Jun 29, 1921	27 years, 206 days	Shibe Park, Philadelphia, Pennsylvania, US	
148	Win	65–8–4 (71)	Frankie Edwards	DQ	9 (12)	Jun 11, 1921	27 years, 188 days	Ebbets Field, New York City, New York, US	
147	Win	64–8–4 (71)	Patsy Scanlon	NWS	10	May 20, 1921	27 years, 166 days	Duquesne Garden, Pittsburgh, Pennsylvania, US	
146	Loss	64–8–4 (70)	Jack 'Kid' Wolfe	PTS	12	May 18, 1921	27 years, 164 days	Troop A. Armory, Cleveland, Ohio, US	
145	Win	64–7–4 (70)	Packey O'Gatty	TKO	9 (15), 2:25	May 11, 1921	27 years, 157 days	Pioneer Sporting Club, New York City, New York, US	
144	Win	63–7–4 (70)	Joe Burman	NWS	8	Apr 25, 1921	27 years, 141 days	National A.C., Philadelphia, Pennsylvania, US	
143	Win	63–7–4 (69)	Earl Puryear	PTS	12	Apr 18, 1921	27 years, 134 days	Playhouse, Baltimore, Maryland, US	
142	Win	62–7–4 (69)	Joe O'Donnell	NWS	8	Mar 17, 1921	27 years, 102 days	National A.C., Philadelphia, Pennsylvania, US	
141	Win	62–7–4 (68)	Marty Collins	PTS	12	Mar 15, 1921	27 years, 100 days	4th Regiment Armory, Baltimore, Maryland, US	
140	Win	61–7–4 (68)	Jack Perry	NWS	8	Mar 5, 1921	27 years, 90 days	National A.C., Philadelphia, Pennsylvania, US	
139	Win	61–7–4 (67)	Tommy Ryan	NWS	10	Mar 2, 1921	27 years, 87 days	Palisades Rink, McKeesport, Pennsylvania, US	
138	Win	61–7–4 (66)	Abe Goldstein	NWS	8	Feb 21, 1921	27 years, 78 days	Olympia A.C., Philadelphia, Pennsylvania, US	
137	Loss	61–7–4 (65)	Carl Tremaine	NWS	8	Jan 24, 1921	27 years, 50 days	Olympia A.C., Philadelphia, Pennsylvania, US	
136	Win	61–7–4 (64)	Battling Harry Leonard	NWS	8	Dec 18, 1920	27 years, 13 days	National A.C., Philadelphia, Pennsylvania, US	
135	Win	61–7–4 (63)	Charles Ledoux	PTS	12	Dec 16, 1920	27 years, 11 days	5th Regiment Armory, Baltimore, Pennsylvania, US	
134	Win	60–7–4 (63)	Earl Puryear	NWS	8	Nov 13, 1920	26 years, 344 days	National A.C., Philadelphia, Pennsylvania, US	
133	Win	60–7–4 (62)	Sammy Sandow	PTS	12	Oct 28, 1920	26 years, 328 days	5th Regiment Armory, Baltimore, Maryland, US	
132	Win	59–7–4 (62)	Joe Nelson	TKO	5 (8)	Oct 16, 1920	26 years, 316 days	National A.C., Philadelphia, Pennsylvania, US	
131	Win	58–7–4 (62)	Johnny Ertle	PTS	12	Aug 13, 1920	26 years, 252 days	Oriole Park, Baltimore, Maryland, US	
130	Win	57–7–4 (62)	Dutch Brandt	TKO	3 (12)	Jun 28, 1920	26 years, 206 days	Oriole Park, Baltimore, Maryland, US	
129	Win	56–7–4 (62)	Patsy Johnson	NWS	8	May 24, 1920	26 years, 171 days	Shibe Park, Philadelphia, Pennsylvania, US	
128	Loss	56–7–4 (61)	Frankie Tucker	KO	3 (8)	Dec 19, 1919	26 years, 14 days	Strand Theater, Drumright, Oklahoma, US	
127	Win	56–6–4 (61)	Andy Chaney	PTS	12	Jun 1, 1918	24 years, 178 days	Oriole Park, Baltimore, Maryland, US	
126	Win	55–6–4 (61)	Joe Tuber	NWS	6	May 20, 1918	24 years, 166 days	Olympia A.C., Philadelphia, Pennsylvania, US	
125	Win	55–6–4 (60)	Jackie Sharkey	PTS	12	Apr 1, 1918	24 years, 117 days	Lyric Theater, Baltimore, Maryland, US	
124	Win	54–6–4 (60)	Joe Leopold	PTS	10	Feb 25, 1918	24 years, 82 days	Denver, Colorado, US	
123	Loss	53–6–4 (60)	Joe Lynch	TKO	4 (6)	Jan 29, 1918	24 years, 55 days	Olympia A.C., Philadelphia, Pennsylvania, US	
122	Draw	53–5–4 (60)	Johnny Ertle	PTS	12	Dec 17, 1917	24 years, 12 days	Lyric Theater, Baltimore, Maryland, US	For world bantamweight title claim
121	Loss	53–5–3 (60)	Benny McNeil	NWS	10	Oct 16, 1917	23 years, 315 days	Future City A.C., Saint Louis, Missouri, US	
120	Win	53–5–3 (59)	Dick Loadman	PTS	12	Oct 1, 1917	23 years, 300 days	Monumental Theater, Baltimore, Maryland, US	
119	Win	52–5–3 (59)	Gussie Lewis	NWS	6	Sep 24, 1917	23 years, 293 days	Olympia A.C., Philadelphia, Pennsylvania, US	
118	Win	52–5–3 (58)	Jackie Sharkey	NWS	6	Jul 27, 1917	23 years, 234 days	Oriole Park, Baltimore, Maryland, US	
117	Loss	52–5–3 (57)	Pete Herman	NWS	6	Jun 13, 1917	23 years, 190 days	Olympia A.C., Philadelphia, Pennsylvania, US	
116	Win	52–5–3 (56)	Benny McNeil	PTS	15	May 24, 1917	23 years, 170 days	Lyric Theater, Baltimore, Maryland, US	
115	Win	51–5–3 (56)	Bernie Hahn	NWS	6	May 14, 1917	23 years, 160 days	Olympia A.C., Philadelphia, Pennsylvania, US	
114	Win	51–5–3 (55)	Jimmy Taylor	NWS	6	Apr 23, 1917	23 years, 139 days	Orpheum Theatre, York, Pennsylvania, US	
113	Win	51–5–3 (54)	Benny McNeil	NWS	6	Apr 2, 1917	23 years, 118 days	Olympia A.C., Philadelphia, Pennsylvania, US	
112	Win	51–5–3 (53)	Jimmy Murray	NWS	10	Mar 27, 1917	23 years, 112 days	Pioneer Sporting Club, New York City, New York, US	
111	Draw	51–5–3 (52)	Joe Lynch	NWS	10	Mar 13, 1917	23 years, 98 days	Pioneer Sporting Club, New York City, New York, US	
110	Win	51–5–3 (51)	Benny Kaufman	TKO	10 (15)	Mar 8, 1917	23 years, 93 days	Monumental Theater, Baltimore, Maryland, US	
109	Loss	50–5–3 (51)	Eddie O'Keefe	NWS	6	Feb 19, 1917	23 years, 76 days	Olympia A.C., Philadelphia, Pennsylvania, US	
108	Win	50–5–3 (50)	Benny McNeil	NWS	15	Jan 30, 1917	23 years, 56 days	Convention Hall, Kansas City, Missouri, US	
107	Loss	50–5–3 (49)	Pete Herman	PTS	20	Jan 9, 1917	23 years, 35 days	Louisiana Auditorium, New Orleans, Louisiana, US	Lost world bantamweight title
106	Win	50–4–3 (49)	Billy Fitzsimmons	NWS	10	Dec 7, 1916	23 years, 2 days	Monumental Theatre, Baltimore, Maryland, US	
105	Win	50–4–3 (48)	Al Shubert	NWS	10	Oct 26, 1916	22 years, 326 days	Monumental Theatre, Baltimore, Maryland, US	
104	Win	50–4–3 (47)	Al Shubert	NWS	6	Oct 16, 1916	22 years, 316 days	Olympia A.C., Philadelphia, Pennsylvania, US	
103	Win	50–4–3 (46)	Benny Kaufman	NWS	6	Oct 2, 1916	22 years, 302 days	Olympia A.C., Philadelphia, Pennsylvania, US	
102	Win	50–4–3 (45)	Dick Loadman	NWS	10	Sep 15, 1916	22 years, 285 days	Broadway Auditorium, Buffalo, New York, US	World bantamweight title at stake; (via KO only)
101	Win	50–4–3 (44)	Joe O'Donnell	NWS	6	Sep 11, 1916	22 years, 281 days	Olympia A.C., Philadelphia, Pennsylvania, US	
100	Win	50–4–3 (43)	Frankie Brown	NWS	10	Sep 4, 1916	22 years, 274 days	Oriole Park, Baltimore, Maryland, US	
99	Win	50–4–3 (42)	Young Joey Mendo	TKO	5 (?)	Aug 28, 1916	22 years, 267 days	Baseball Park, Buffalo, New York, US	
98	Win	49–4–3 (42)	Alf Mansfield	TKO	5 (10)	Jul 12, 1916	22 years, 220 days	Gayety Theater, Baltimore, Maryland, US	
97	Win	48–4–3 (42)	Benny McCoy	TKO	7 (10)	May 30, 1916	22 years, 177 days	Holliday Street Theatre, Baltimore, Maryland, US	
96	Win	47–4–3 (42)	Billy Bevan	NWS	10	May 15, 1916	22 years, 162 days	Coliseum A.C., Wilkes-Barre, Pennsylvania, US	World bantamweight title at stake; (via KO only)
95	Win	47–4–3 (41)	Battling Lahn	NWS	10	Apr 11, 1916	22 years, 128 days	Monumental Theater, Baltimore, Maryland, US	
94	Draw	47–4–3 (40)	Pete Herman	PTS	20	Feb 7, 1916	22 years, 64 days	Louisiana Auditorium, New Orleans, Louisiana, US	Retained world bantamweight title
93	Draw	47–4–2 (40)	Frankie Burns	PTS	20	Dec 6, 1915	22 years, 1 day	Tulane Arena, New Orleans, Louisiana, US	Retained world bantamweight title
92	Loss	47–4–1 (40)	Memphis Pal Moore	NWS	8	Oct 28, 1915	21 years, 327 days	Phoenix A.C., Memphis, Tennessee, US	
91	Win	47–4–1 (39)	Dutch Brandt	PTS	10	Oct 5, 1915	21 years, 304 days	Lyric Theater, Baltimore, Maryland, US	
90	Loss	46–4–1 (39)	Johnny Ertle	DQ	5 (10)	Sep 10, 1915	21 years, 279 days	Auditorium, Saint Paul, Minnesota, US	World bantamweight title at stake; Referee said that Williams landed low blows and DQ'd him Both fighters claimed the title
89	Win	46–3–1 (39)	Jimmy Taylor	PTS	15	Jul 24, 1915	21 years, 231 days	Terrapin Park, Baltimore, Maryland, US	Retained world bantamweight title
88	Win	45–3–1 (39)	Jimmy Murray	NWS	10	Jun 4, 1915	21 years, 181 days	Palace Theater, Baltimore, Maryland, US	World bantamweight title at stake; (via KO only)
87	Loss	45–3–1 (38)	Louisiana	NWS	6	Apr 5, 1915	21 years, 121 days	Olympia A.C., Philadelphia, Pennsylvania, US	
86	Loss	45–3–1 (37)	Johnny Kilbane	NWS	6	Mar 17, 1915	21 years, 102 days	Olympia A.C., Philadelphia, Pennsylvania, US	
85	NC	45–3–1 (36)	Joe Superior	NC	5 (?)	Feb 25, 1915	21 years, 82 days	Bijou Theater, Atlanta, Georgia, US	
84	Win	45–3–1 (35)	Jimmy Murray	NWS	6	Feb 15, 1915	21 years, 72 days	Olympia A.C., Philadelphia, Pennsylvania, US	
83	Win	45–3–1 (34)	Eddie Wallace	NWS	10	Feb 2, 1915	21 years, 59 days	Broadway Arena, New York City, New York, US	
82	Win	45–3–1 (33)	Johnny Daly	NWS	10	Dec 25, 1914	21 years, 20 days	Pioneer Sporting Club, New York City, New York, US	
81	Win	45–3–1 (32)	Joe O'Donnell	TKO	3 (6)	Dec 19, 1914	21 years, 14 days	National A.C., Philadelphia, Pennsylvania, US	
80	Win	44–3–1 (32)	Young Freddie Diggins	TKO	3 (6)	Nov 30, 1914	20 years, 360 days	Olympia A.C., Philadelphia, Pennsylvania, US	
79	Win	43–3–1 (32)	Dutch Brandt	NWS	10	Oct 27, 1914	20 years, 326 days	Broadway S.C., New York City, New York, US	
78	Win	43–3–1 (31)	Pekin Kid Herman	KO	4 (6)	Sep 28, 1914	20 years, 297 days	Olympia A.C., Philadelphia, Pennsylvania, US	
77	Win	42–3–1 (31)	Louisiana	NWS	6	Sep 14, 1914	20 years, 283 days	Olympia A.C., Philadelphia, Pennsylvania, US	
76	Win	42–3–1 (30)	Pete Herman	NWS	10	Jun 30, 1914	20 years, 207 days	Pelican Stadium, New Orleans, Louisiana, US	
75	Win	42–3–1 (29)	Johnny Coulon	KO	3 (20)	Jun 9, 1914	20 years, 186 days	Arena, Vernon, California, US	Retained world bantamweight title claim; Won world bantamweight title
74	Draw	41–3–1 (29)	Louisiana	NWS	6	Apr 6, 1914	20 years, 122 days	Olympia A.C., Philadelphia, Pennsylvania, US	
73	Win	41–3–1 (28)	Young Freddie Diggins	NWS	6	Mar 23, 1914	20 years, 108 days	Olympia A.C., Philadelphia, Pennsylvania, US	
72	Win	41–3–1 (27)	Eddie Campi	KO	12 (20)	Jan 31, 1914	20 years, 57 days	Arena, Vernon, California, US	Retained world bantamweight title claim; Won European bantamweight title
71	Win	40–3–1 (27)	Chick Hayes	TKO	7 (15)	Jan 5, 1914	20 years, 31 days	Monumental Theatre, Baltimore, Wisconsin, US	Retained world bantamweight title claim
70	Win	39–3–1 (27)	Dick Loadman	NWS	10	Nov 27, 1913	19 years, 357 days	Riverview A.C., Milwaukee, Wisconsin, US	World bantamweight title claim at stake; (via KO only)
69	Win	39–3–1 (26)	Battling Reddy	NWS	6	Nov 24, 1913	19 years, 354 days	Olympia A.C., Philadelphia, Pennsylvania, US	
68	Win	39–3–1 (25)	Patsy Brannigan	NWS	6	Oct 25, 1913	19 years, 324 days	Old City Hall, Pittsburgh, Pennsylvania, US	
67	Win	39–3–1 (24)	Willie Mack	NWS	6	Oct 6, 1913	19 years, 305 days	Olympia A.C., Philadelphia, Pennsylvania, US	
66	Win	39–3–1 (23)	Mickey Dunn	KO	2 (15)	Oct 3, 1913	19 years, 302 days	Albaugh Theater, Baltimore, Maryland, US	Retained world bantamweight title claim
65	Win	38–3–1 (23)	Charles Ledoux	TKO	16 (20)	Jul 15, 1913	19 years, 222 days	Arena, Vernon, California, US	Claimed vacant world bantamweight title
64	Win	37–3–1 (23)	Jim Kenrick	TKO	6 (15)	Jun 11, 1913	19 years, 188 days	Oriole Park, Baltimore, Maryland, US	
63	Win	36–3–1 (23)	Young Freddie Diggins	KO	4 (15)	May 14, 1913	19 years, 160 days	Empire Theater, Baltimore, Maryland, US	
62	Win	35–3–1 (23)	Louisiana	NWS	6	Apr 26, 1913	19 years, 142 days	National A.C., Philadelphia, Pennsylvania, US	
61	Draw	35–3–1 (22)	Frank Bradley	NWS	6	Apr 14, 1913	19 years, 130 days	Olympia A.C., Philadelphia, Pennsylvania, US	
60	Win	35–3–1 (21)	Frankie Conway	NWS	6	Mar 29, 1913	19 years, 114 days	National A.C., Philadelphia, Pennsylvania, US	
59	Win	35–3–1 (20)	Eddie Campi	PTS	20	Feb 12, 1913	19 years, 69 days	Arena, Vernon, California, US	
58	Win	34–3–1 (20)	Frankie Conway	NWS	6	Jan 4, 1913	19 years, 30 days	National A.C., Philadelphia, Pennsylvania, US	
57	Win	34–3–1 (19)	Charles Ledoux	NWS	6	Dec 11, 1912	19 years, 6 days	National A.C., Philadelphia, Pennsylvania, US	
56	Win	34–3–1 (18)	Harry Smith	NWS	6	Nov 22, 1912	18 years, 353 days	Olympia A.C., Philadelphia, Pennsylvania, US	
55	Win	34–3–1 (17)	Billy Fitzsimmons	NWS	10	Nov 6, 1912	18 years, 337 days	Fairmont A.C., New York City, New York, US	
54	Win	34–3–1 (16)	Johnny Hughes	NWS	6	Nov 1, 1912	18 years, 332 days	Olympia A.C., Philadelphia, Pennsylvania, US	
53	Win	34–3–1 (15)	Johnny Coulon	NWS	10	Oct 18, 1912	18 years, 318 days	Madison Square Garden, New York City, New York, US	World bantamweight title at stake; (via KO only)
52	Win	34–3–1 (14)	Young Freddie Diggins	NWS	6	Sep 24, 1912	18 years, 294 days	Spring Garden A.C., Philadelphia, Pennsylvania, US	
51	Win	34–3–1 (13)	Billy Fitzsimmons	TKO	8 (10)	Sep 16, 1912	18 years, 286 days	Madison Square Garden, New York City, New York, US	
50	Win	33–3–1 (13)	Mickey Brown	TKO	8 (?)	Sep 4, 1912	18 years, 274 days	St. Nicholas Arena, New York City, New York, US	
49	Win	32–3–1 (13)	Kid Kelly	TKO	9 (10)	Aug 26, 1912	18 years, 265 days	Madison Square Garden, New York City, New York, US	
48	Win	31–3–1 (13)	Battling Reddy	NWS	10	Aug 17, 1912	18 years, 256 days	St. Nicholas Arena, New York City, New York, US	
47	Win	31–3–1 (12)	Young Mickey McDonough	TKO	5 (10)	Aug 9, 1912	18 years, 248 days	Albaugh's Theater, Baltimore, Maryland, US	
46	Win	30–3–1 (12)	Johnny Solzberg	RTD	7 (10)	Jul 29, 1912	18 years, 237 days	Madison Square Garden, New York City, New York, US	
45	Win	29–3–1 (12)	Artie Edwards	TKO	8 (10)	Jul 20, 1912	18 years, 228 days	Fairmont A.C., New York City, New York, US	
44	Win	28–3–1 (12)	Charley Goldman	PTS	15	May 31, 1912	18 years, 178 days	Albaugh Theater, Baltimore, Maryland, US	
43	Win	27–3–1 (12)	Young Ketchel	KO	2 (15)	May 2, 1912	18 years, 149 days	Holliday Street Theatre, Baltimore, Maryland, US	
42	Win	26–3–1 (12)	Battling Reddy	NWS	10	Apr 23, 1912	18 years, 140 days	St. Nicholas Arena, New York City, New York, US	
41	Win	26–3–1 (11)	Johnny Daly	PTS	15	Apr 9, 1912	18 years, 126 days	Albaugh Theater, Baltimore, Maryland, US	
40	Win	25–3–1 (11)	Kohoma Kid	KO	4 (15)	Mar 6, 1912	18 years, 92 days	Albaugh Theater, Baltimore, Maryland, US	
39	Win	24–3–1 (11)	Young Joe Stanley	NWS	10	Feb 10, 1912	18 years, 67 days	Fairmont A.C., New York City, New York, US	
38	Loss	24–3–1 (10)	Johnny Solzberg	NWS	10	Jan 30, 1912	18 years, 56 days	Royale A.C., New York City, New York, US	
37	Win	24–3–1 (9)	Benny Reilly	KO	12 (15)	Jan 19, 1912	18 years, 45 days	Baltimore, Maryland, US	
36	Win	23–3–1 (9)	Young Mickey McDonough	NWS	10	Jan 17, 1912	18 years, 43 days	Royale A.C., New York City, New York, US	
35	Draw	23–3–1 (8)	Charley Harvey	NWS	10	Jan 15, 1912	18 years, 41 days	Brooklyn Beach A.C., New York City, New York, US	
34	Win	23–3–1 (7)	Banty Lewis	NWS	10	Jan 6, 1912	18 years, 32 days	Fairmont A.C., New York City, New York, US	
33	Win	23–3–1 (6)	Barry Hill	NWS	10	Dec 23, 1911	18 years, 18 days	Fairmont A.C., New York City, New York, US	
32	Win	23–3–1 (5)	Eddie McCloskey	PTS	6	Nov 24, 1911	17 years, 354 days	Germania Maennerchor Hall, Baltimore, Maryland, US	
31	Win	22–3–1 (5)	Frankie Smith	TKO	6 (6)	Nov 10, 1911	17 years, 340 days	Germania Maennerchor Hall, Baltimore, Maryland, US	
30	Win	21–3–1 (5)	Barry Hill	PTS	15	Oct 30, 1911	17 years, 329 days	Germania Maennerchor Hall, Baltimore, Maryland, US	
29	Win	20–3–1 (5)	Paddy Mitchell	NWS	6	Oct 2, 1911	17 years, 301 days	Brooklyn Beach A.C., New York City, New York, US	
28	Win	20–3–1 (4)	Willie Carroll	KO	2 (6)	Sep 4, 1911	17 years, 273 days	Brighton Beach A.C., Brighton Beach, Indiana, US	
27	ND	19–3–1 (4)	K.O. Sweeney	ND	10	Aug 19, 1911	17 years, 257 days	New York City, New York, US	
26	Win	19–3–1 (3)	Willie Faust	KO	4 (6)	Aug 15, 1911	17 years, 253 days	Twentieth Century A.C., New York City, New York, US	
25	Win	18–3–1 (3)	Johnny Solzberg	NWS	10	Aug 7, 1911	17 years, 245 days	Brooklyn Beach A.C., New York City, New York, US	
24	Win	18–3–1 (2)	Willie Carroll	KO	4 (6)	Aug 1, 1911	17 years, 239 days	20th Century A.C., New York City, New York, US	
23	Win	17–3–1 (2)	Babe Davis	KO	1 (?)	Jul 31, 1911	17 years, 238 days	Perth Amboy, New Jersey, US	
22	Win	16–3–1 (2)	Babe Davis	TKO	5 (?)	Jul 28, 1911	17 years, 235 days	Twentieth Century A.C., New York City, New York, US	
21	Win	15–3–1 (2)	Young Packey McFarland	KO	5 (?)	Jul 27, 1911	17 years, 234 days	New York City, New York, US	
20	Loss	14–3–1 (2)	George K.O. Chaney	PTS	20	Jul 10, 1911	17 years, 217 days	Ford Opera House, Baltimore, Maryland, US	
19	Win	14–2–1 (2)	Kid Murphy	PTS	15	May 26, 1911	17 years, 172 days	Monumental Theater, Baltimore, Maryland, US	
18	Win	13–2–1 (2)	Jimmy Cross	KO	5 (10)	Mar 21, 1911	17 years, 106 days	Germania Maennerchor Hall, Baltimore, Maryland, US	
17	Loss	12–2–1 (2)	Charley Harvey	PTS	15	Mar 14, 1911	17 years, 99 days	Germania Maennerchor Hall, Baltimore, Maryland, US	
16	Win	12–1–1 (2)	Leo Walton	KO	3 (10)	Feb 20, 1911	17 years, 77 days	Albaugh Theater, Baltimore, Maryland, US	
15	Loss	11–1–1 (2)	George K.O. Chaney	KO	6 (15)	Jan 2, 1911	17 years, 28 days	Germania Maennerchor Hall, Baltimore, Maryland, US	
14	Win	11–0–1 (2)	Tommy Buck	NWS	10	Nov 29, 1910	16 years, 359 days	Albaugh Theater, Baltimore, Maryland, US	
13	Win	11–0–1 (1)	Frank Bradley	KO	5 (15)	Nov 1, 1910	16 years, 331 days	Princess Theater, Baltimore, Maryland, US	
12	Draw	10–0–1 (1)	Tommy Buck	PTS	15	Oct 11, 1910	16 years, 310 days	Albaugh Theater, Baltimore, Maryland, US	
11	Win	10–0 (1)	Babe Stinger	KO	5 (6)	Oct 4, 1910	16 years, 303 days	Albaugh Theater, Baltimore, Maryland, US	
10	Win	9–0 (1)	Buck Kirchener	TKO	4 (6)	Sep 26, 1910	16 years, 295 days	Albaugh Theater, Baltimore, Maryland, US	
9	Win	8–0 (1)	Sammy Miller	KO	1 (6)	Sep 12, 1910	16 years, 281 days	Albaugh Theater, Baltimore, Maryland, US	
8	Win	7–0 (1)	Buddy Jones	KO	2 (6)	Sep 12, 1910	16 years, 281 days	Albaugh Theater, Baltimore, Maryland, US	
7	Win	6–0 (1)	Joe Britton	KO	1 (?)	Sep 12, 1910	16 years, 281 days	Albaugh Theater, Baltimore, Maryland, US	
6	Win	5–0 (1)	Sammy Miller	KO	1 (6)	Sep 12, 1910	16 years, 281 days	Albaugh Theater, Baltimore, Maryland, US	
5	Loss	4–0 (1)	Tommy Buck	NWS	6	Aug 29, 1910	16 years, 267 days	Albaugh Theater, Baltimore, Maryland, US	
4	Win	4–0	Shep Farren	KO	6 (6)	Aug 22, 1910	16 years, 260 days	Germania Maennerchor Hall, Baltimore, Maryland, US	
3	Win	3–0	Young McFarland	TKO	1 (6)	Aug 9, 1910	16 years, 247 days	Oriole Park, Baltimore, Maryland, US	
2	Win	2–0	Ike Miller	KO	2 (6)	Aug 1, 1910	16 years, 239 days	Oriole Park, Baltimore, Maryland, US	
1	Win	1–0	Shep Farren	KO	5 (6)	Jul 25, 1910	16 years, 232 days	Oriole Park, Baltimore, Maryland, US	

=== Unofficial record ===
207 fights	162 wins	30 losses
By knockout	50	5
By decision	104	20
By disqualification	8	5
Draws	12	
No contests	3	

Record with the inclusion of newspaper decisions to the win/loss/draw column.

No.	Result	Record	Opponent	Type	Round, time	Date	Age	Location	Notes
207	Loss	162–30–12 (3)	Bobby Burns	TKO	2 (8)	Sep 3, 1929	35 years, 272 days	Carlin's Park, Baltimore, Maryland, US	
206	Win	162–29–12 (3)	Frankie Garcia	PTS	8	Jul 12, 1929	35 years, 219 days	Greensboro A.C., Greensboro, Maryland, US	
205	Loss	161–29–12 (3)	Joe Belmont	PTS	8	Apr 9, 1929	35 years, 125 days	Armory, Hagerstown, Maryland, US	
204	Loss	161–28–12 (3)	Sid Lampe	PTS	10	Mar 6, 1929	35 years, 91 days	104th Regiment Armory, Baltimore, Maryland, US	
203	Win	161–27–12 (3)	Sid Lampe	DQ	8 (12)	Feb 11, 1929	35 years, 68 days	104th Regiment Armory, Baltimore, Maryland, US	
202	Win	160–27–12 (3)	Bobby Garcia	PTS	10	Jan 14, 1929	35 years, 40 days	104th Regiment Armory, Baltimore, Maryland, US	
201	Win	159–27–12 (3)	Lou Guglielmini	PTS	8	Dec 27, 1928	35 years, 22 days	Armory, Hagerstown, Maryland, US	
200	Win	158–27–12 (3)	Willie Parrish	TKO	5 (10)	Dec 14, 1928	35 years, 9 days	104th Medical Regiment Armory, Baltimore, Maryland, US	
199	Win	157–27–12 (3)	Joe Caniano	PTS	8	Dec 7, 1928	35 years, 2 days	National Guard Armory, Centreville, Maryland, US	
198	Win	156–27–12 (3)	Eddie Bowling	PTS	8	Nov 29, 1928	34 years, 360 days	St. Stanislaus Hall, Baltimore, Maryland, US	
197	Win	155–27–12 (3)	Joe Caniano	PTS	8	Oct 26, 1928	34 years, 326 days	National Guard Armory, Centreville, Florida, US	
196	Win	154–27–12 (3)	Lou Guglielmini	PTS	8	Sep 28, 1928	34 years, 298 days	Riverview Park, Baltimore, Maryland, US	
195	Win	153–27–12 (3)	Jack Daly	PTS	8	Sep 7, 1928	34 years, 277 days	Riverview Park, Baltimore, Maryland, US	
194	Draw	152–27–12 (3)	Tony Ross	PTS	12	Aug 27, 1928	34 years, 266 days	Maryland Baseball Park, Baltimore, Maryland, US	
193	Win	152–27–11 (3)	Young Joe O'Donnell	PTS	8	Aug 8, 1928	34 years, 247 days	Location unknown	
192	Loss	151–27–11 (3)	Eddie Buell	TKO	4 (8)	Jul 19, 1928	34 years, 227 days	Riverview Park, Baltimore, Maryland, US	
191	Win	151–26–11 (3)	Jimmy Hogan	PTS	3	Jul 15, 1927	33 years, 222 days	5th Regiment Armory, Baltimore, Maryland, US	
190	Win	150–26–11 (3)	Jack Skinner	KO	3 (8)	Feb 25, 1927	33 years, 82 days	St. Stanislaus Hall, Baltimore, Maryland, US	
189	Loss	149–26–11 (3)	Battling Mack	NWS	10	Mar 19, 1926	32 years, 104 days	Convention Hall, Camden, New Jersey, US	
188	Win	149–25–11 (3)	Al Monahan	PTS	10	Mar 5, 1926	32 years, 90 days	Cambria A.C., Philadelphia, Pennsylvania, US	
187	NC	148–25–11 (3)	Billy Pimpus	NC	3 (8)	Feb 8, 1926	32 years, 65 days	Waltz Dream Arena, Atlantic City, New Jersey, US	Cut from accidental headbutt
186	Loss	148–25–11 (2)	Nate Carp	DQ	11 (12)	Jan 4, 1926	32 years, 30 days	104th Regiment Armory, Baltimore, Maryland, US	
185	Win	148–24–11 (2)	Jackie West	PTS	10	Dec 28, 1925	32 years, 23 days	Arcade, Washington, D.C., US	
184	Draw	147–24–11 (2)	Jackie West	PTS	10	Oct 2, 1925	31 years, 301 days	Grime's Battery Armory, Norfolk, Virginia, US	
183	Win	147–24–10 (2)	Midget Smith	DQ	7 (12)	Sep 28, 1925	31 years, 297 days	104th Regiment Armory, Baltimore, Maryland, US	
182	Win	146–24–10 (2)	Red Leonard	PTS	10	Sep 4, 1925	31 years, 273 days	Grime's Battery Armory, Norfolk, Virginia, US	
181	Win	145–24–10 (2)	Midget Smith	PTS	12	Aug 21, 1925	31 years, 259 days	Carlin's Park, Baltimore, Maryland, US	
180	Loss	144–24–10 (2)	Frankie Genaro	PTS	12	Jun 26, 1925	31 years, 203 days	Carlin's Park, Baltimore, Maryland, US	
179	Win	144–23–10 (2)	Terry McHugh	DQ	3 (10)	Apr 24, 1925	31 years, 140 days	Charlton's Hall, Pottsville, Pennsylvania, US	McHugh DQ'd for low blows
178	Draw	143–23–10 (2)	Lew Mayrs	PTS	12	Apr 20, 1925	31 years, 136 days	104th Regiment Armory, Baltimore, Maryland, US	
177	Win	143–23–9 (2)	Al Monahan	NW	8	Feb 9, 1925	31 years, 66 days	Waltz Dream Arena, Atlantic City, New Jersey, US	
176	Win	142–23–9 (2)	Jackie West	NWS	8	Jan 19, 1925	31 years, 45 days	Waltz Dream Arena, Atlantic City, New Jersey, US	
175	Win	141–23–9 (2)	Joey Schwartz	PTS	12	Dec 29, 1924	31 years, 24 days	104th Regiment Armory, Baltimore, Maryland, US	
174	Win	140–23–9 (2)	Al Markie	PTS	10	Apr 5, 1924	30 years, 122 days	108th Field Artillery Armory, Philadelphia, Pennsylvania, US	
173	Loss	139–23–9 (2)	Abe Friedman	DQ	8 (12)	Feb 27, 1924	30 years, 84 days	Marieville Gardens, North Providence, Rhode Island, US	Williams DQ'd for a kidney blow and blow to the back of the head
172	Win	139–22–9 (2)	Young Montreal	PTS	10	Feb 6, 1924	30 years, 63 days	Providence, Rhode Island, US	
171	Win	138–22–9 (2)	Charley Goodman	PTS	12	Jan 14, 1924	30 years, 40 days	Broadway Arena, New York City, New York, US	
170	Win	137–22–9 (2)	Midget Smith	PTS	12	Jan 1, 1924	30 years, 27 days	Rink S.C., New York City, New York, US	
169	Win	136–22–9 (2)	Danny Lee	KO	1 (12), 1:20	Dec 22, 1923	30 years, 17 days	Commonwealth Sporting Club, New York City, New York, US	
168	Win	135–22–9 (2)	Ludger Kid Dube	NWS	6	Dec 12, 1923	30 years, 7 days	Waterville, Maine, US	
167	Loss	134–22–9 (2)	Charley Holman	DQ	9 (12)	Oct 24, 1923	29 years, 323 days	Gayety Theater, Baltimore, Maryland, US	Williams DQ'd for a kidney blow
166	Win	134–21–9 (2)	Frankie Daly	PTS	12	Sep 26, 1923	29 years, 295 days	Gayety Theater, Baltimore, Maryland, US	
165	Loss	133–21–9 (2)	Pancho Villa	NWS	8	Jul 31, 1923	29 years, 238 days	Shetzline Ballpark, Philadelphia, Pennsylvania, US	
164	Win	133–20–9 (2)	Bud Dempsey	PTS	12	Jul 13, 1923	29 years, 220 days	Steeplechase A.A., New York City, New York, US	
163	Loss	132–20–9 (2)	Bobby Garcia	PTS	12	Apr 25, 1923	29 years, 141 days	Gayety Theater, Baltimore, Maryland, US	
162	Win	132–19–9 (2)	Battling Mack	NWS	8	Apr 16, 1923	29 years, 132 days	Arena, Philadelphia, Pennsylvania, US	
161	Loss	131–19–9 (2)	Bobby Garcia	DQ	9 (12)	Apr 4, 1923	29 years, 120 days	Gayety Theater, Baltimore, Maryland, US	
160	Win	131–18–9 (2)	Sammy Sandow	PTS	12	Mar 12, 1923	29 years, 97 days	4th Regiment Armory, Baltimore, Maryland, US	
159	Win	130–18–9 (2)	Young Montreal	PTS	12	Jan 15, 1923	29 years, 41 days	4th Regiment Armory, Baltimore, Maryland, US	
158	Win	129–18–9 (2)	Battling Harry Leonard	DQ	1 (12), 2:24	Dec 22, 1922	29 years, 17 days	Madison Square Garden, New York City, New York, US	Leonard DQ'd for a low blow
157	Win	128–18–9 (2)	Eddie O'Dowd	DQ	9 (10)	Nov 24, 1922	28 years, 354 days	Infantry Hall, Providence, Rhode Island, US	
156	Win	127–18–9 (2)	Roy Moore	TKO	11 (12)	Sep 18, 1922	28 years, 287 days	4th Regiment Armory, Baltimore, Maryland, US	
155	Win	126–18–9 (2)	Joe Dundee	DQ	10 (12)	Sep 4, 1922	28 years, 273 days	4th Regiment Armory, Baltimore, Maryland, US	
154	Win	125–18–9 (2)	Joe Mandell	DQ	6 (?)	Jul 8, 1922	28 years, 215 days	Ridgewood Grove S.C., New York City, New York, US	
153	Draw	124–18–9 (2)	Terry Martin	PTS	12	Feb 15, 1922	28 years, 72 days	Marieville Gardens, North Providence, Rhode Island, US	
152	Win	124–18–8 (2)	Jimmy Mendo	NWS	8	Oct 18, 1921	27 years, 317 days	Armory, Reading, Pennsylvania, US	
151	Win	123–18–8 (2)	Mickey Brown	PTS	12	Oct 13, 1921	27 years, 312 days	Broadway Arena, New York City, New York, US	
150	Loss	122–18–8 (2)	Andy Chaney	PTS	10	Oct 4, 1921	27 years, 303 days	Mechanics Building, Boston, Massachusetts, US	
149	Win	122–17–8 (2)	Louisiana	NWS	8	Jun 29, 1921	27 years, 206 days	Shibe Park, Philadelphia, Pennsylvania, US	
148	Win	121–17–8 (2)	Frankie Edwards	DQ	9 (12)	Jun 11, 1921	27 years, 188 days	Ebbets Field, New York City, New York, US	
147	Win	120–17–8 (2)	Patsy Scanlon	NWS	10	May 20, 1921	27 years, 166 days	Duquesne Garden, Pittsburgh, Pennsylvania, US	
146	Loss	119–17–8 (2)	Jack 'Kid' Wolfe	PTS	12	May 18, 1921	27 years, 164 days	Troop A. Armory, Cleveland, Ohio, US	
145	Win	119–16–8 (2)	Packey O'Gatty	TKO	9 (15), 2:25	May 11, 1921	27 years, 157 days	Pioneer Sporting Club, New York City, New York, US	
144	Win	118–16–8 (2)	Joe Burman	NWS	8	Apr 25, 1921	27 years, 141 days	National A.C., Philadelphia, Pennsylvania, US	
143	Win	117–16–8 (2)	Earl Puryear	PTS	12	Apr 18, 1921	27 years, 134 days	Playhouse, Baltimore, Maryland, US	
142	Win	116–16–8 (2)	Joe O'Donnell	NWS	8	Mar 17, 1921	27 years, 102 days	National A.C., Philadelphia, Pennsylvania, US	
141	Win	115–16–8 (2)	Marty Collins	PTS	12	Mar 15, 1921	27 years, 100 days	4th Regiment Armory, Baltimore, Maryland, US	
140	Win	114–16–8 (2)	Jack Perry	NWS	8	Mar 5, 1921	27 years, 90 days	National A.C., Philadelphia, Pennsylvania, US	
139	Win	113–16–8 (2)	Tommy Ryan	NWS	10	Mar 2, 1921	27 years, 87 days	Palisades Rink, McKeesport, Pennsylvania, US	
138	Win	112–16–8 (2)	Abe Goldstein	NWS	8	Feb 21, 1921	27 years, 78 days	Olympia A.C., Philadelphia, Pennsylvania, US	
137	Loss	111–16–8 (2)	Carl Tremaine	NWS	8	Jan 24, 1921	27 years, 50 days	Olympia A.C., Philadelphia, Pennsylvania, US	
136	Win	111–15–8 (2)	Battling Harry Leonard	NWS	8	Dec 18, 1920	27 years, 13 days	National A.C., Philadelphia, Pennsylvania, US	
135	Win	110–15–8 (2)	Charles Ledoux	PTS	12	Dec 16, 1920	27 years, 11 days	5th Regiment Armory, Baltimore, Pennsylvania, US	
134	Win	109–15–8 (2)	Earl Puryear	NWS	8	Nov 13, 1920	26 years, 344 days	National A.C., Philadelphia, Pennsylvania, US	
133	Win	108–15–8 (2)	Sammy Sandow	PTS	12	Oct 28, 1920	26 years, 328 days	5th Regiment Armory, Baltimore, Maryland, US	
132	Win	107–15–8 (2)	Joe Nelson	TKO	5 (8)	Oct 16, 1920	26 years, 316 days	National A.C., Philadelphia, Pennsylvania, US	
131	Win	106–15–8 (2)	Johnny Ertle	PTS	12	Aug 13, 1920	26 years, 252 days	Oriole Park, Baltimore, Maryland, US	
130	Win	105–15–8 (2)	Dutch Brandt	TKO	3 (12)	Jun 28, 1920	26 years, 206 days	Oriole Park, Baltimore, Maryland, US	
129	Win	104–15–8 (2)	Patsy Johnson	NWS	8	May 24, 1920	26 years, 171 days	Shibe Park, Philadelphia, Pennsylvania, US	
128	Loss	103–15–8 (2)	Frankie Tucker	KO	3 (8)	Dec 19, 1919	26 years, 14 days	Strand Theater, Drumright, Oklahoma, US	
127	Win	103–14–8 (2)	Andy Chaney	PTS	12	Jun 1, 1918	24 years, 178 days	Oriole Park, Baltimore, Maryland, US	
126	Win	102–14–8 (2)	Joe Tuber	NWS	6	May 20, 1918	24 years, 166 days	Olympia A.C., Philadelphia, Pennsylvania, US	
125	Win	101–14–8 (2)	Jackie Sharkey	PTS	12	Apr 1, 1918	24 years, 117 days	Lyric Theater, Baltimore, Maryland, US	
124	Win	100–14–8 (2)	Joe Leopold	PTS	10	Feb 25, 1918	24 years, 82 days	Denver, Colorado, US	
123	Loss	99–14–8 (2)	Joe Lynch	TKO	4 (6)	Jan 29, 1918	24 years, 55 days	Olympia A.C., Philadelphia, Pennsylvania, US	
122	Draw	99–13–8 (2)	Johnny Ertle	PTS	12	Dec 17, 1917	24 years, 12 days	Lyric Theater, Baltimore, Maryland, US	For world bantamweight title claim
121	Loss	99–13–7 (2)	Benny McNeil	NWS	10	Oct 16, 1917	23 years, 315 days	Future City A.C., Saint Louis, Missouri, US	
120	Win	99–12–7 (2)	Dick Loadman	PTS	12	Oct 1, 1917	23 years, 300 days	Monumental Theater, Baltimore, Maryland, US	
119	Win	98–12–7 (2)	Gussie Lewis	NWS	6	Sep 24, 1917	23 years, 293 days	Olympia A.C., Philadelphia, Pennsylvania, US	
118	Win	97–12–7 (2)	Jackie Sharkey	NWS	6	Jul 27, 1917	23 years, 234 days	Oriole Park, Baltimore, Maryland, US	
117	Loss	96–12–7 (2)	Pete Herman	NWS	6	Jun 13, 1917	23 years, 190 days	Olympia A.C., Philadelphia, Pennsylvania, US	
116	Win	96–11–7 (2)	Benny McNeil	PTS	15	May 24, 1917	23 years, 170 days	Lyric Theater, Baltimore, Maryland, US	
115	Win	95–11–7 (2)	Bernie Hahn	NWS	6	May 14, 1917	23 years, 160 days	Olympia A.C., Philadelphia, Pennsylvania, US	
114	Win	94–11–7 (2)	Jimmy Taylor	NWS	6	Apr 23, 1917	23 years, 139 days	Orpheum Theatre, York, Pennsylvania, US	
113	Win	93–11–7 (2)	Benny McNeil	NWS	6	Apr 2, 1917	23 years, 118 days	Olympia A.C., Philadelphia, Pennsylvania, US	
112	Win	92–11–7 (2)	Jimmy Murray	NWS	10	Mar 27, 1917	23 years, 112 days	Pioneer Sporting Club, New York City, New York, US	
111	Draw	91–11–7 (2)	Joe Lynch	NWS	10	Mar 13, 1917	23 years, 98 days	Pioneer Sporting Club, New York City, New York, US	
110	Win	91–11–6 (2)	Benny Kaufman	TKO	10 (15)	Mar 8, 1917	23 years, 93 days	Monumental Theater, Baltimore, Maryland, US	
109	Loss	90–11–6 (2)	Eddie O'Keefe	NWS	6	Feb 19, 1917	23 years, 76 days	Olympia A.C., Philadelphia, Pennsylvania, US	
108	Win	90–10–6 (2)	Benny McNeil	NWS	15	Jan 30, 1917	23 years, 56 days	Convention Hall, Kansas City, Missouri, US	
107	Loss	89–10–6 (2)	Pete Herman	PTS	20	Jan 9, 1917	23 years, 35 days	Louisiana Auditorium, New Orleans, Louisiana, US	Lost world bantamweight title
106	Win	89–9–6 (2)	Billy Fitzsimmons	NWS	10	Dec 7, 1916	23 years, 2 days	Monumental Theatre, Baltimore, Maryland, US	
105	Win	88–9–6 (2)	Al Shubert	NWS	10	Oct 26, 1916	22 years, 326 days	Monumental Theatre, Baltimore, Maryland, US	
104	Win	87–9–6 (2)	Al Shubert	NWS	6	Oct 16, 1916	22 years, 316 days	Olympia A.C., Philadelphia, Pennsylvania, US	
103	Win	86–9–6 (2)	Benny Kaufman	NWS	6	Oct 2, 1916	22 years, 302 days	Olympia A.C., Philadelphia, Pennsylvania, US	
102	Win	85–9–6 (2)	Dick Loadman	NWS	10	Sep 15, 1916	22 years, 285 days	Broadway Auditorium, Buffalo, New York, US	World bantamweight title at stake; (via KO only)
101	Win	84–9–6 (2)	Joe O'Donnell	NWS	6	Sep 11, 1916	22 years, 281 days	Olympia A.C., Philadelphia, Pennsylvania, US	
100	Win	83–9–6 (2)	Frankie Brown	NWS	10	Sep 4, 1916	22 years, 274 days	Oriole Park, Baltimore, Maryland, US	
99	Win	82–9–6 (2)	Young Joey Mendo	TKO	5 (?)	Aug 28, 1916	22 years, 267 days	Baseball Park, Buffalo, New York, US	
98	Win	81–9–6 (2)	Alf Mansfield	TKO	5 (10)	Jul 12, 1916	22 years, 220 days	Gayety Theater, Baltimore, Maryland, US	
97	Win	80–9–6 (2)	Benny McCoy	TKO	7 (10)	May 30, 1916	22 years, 177 days	Holliday Street Theatre, Baltimore, Maryland, US	
96	Win	79–9–6 (2)	Billy Bevan	NWS	10	May 15, 1916	22 years, 162 days	Coliseum A.C., Wilkes-Barre, Pennsylvania, US	World bantamweight title at stake; (via KO only)
95	Win	78–9–6 (2)	Battling Lahn	NWS	10	Apr 11, 1916	22 years, 128 days	Monumental Theater, Baltimore, Maryland, US	
94	Draw	77–9–6 (2)	Pete Herman	PTS	20	Feb 7, 1916	22 years, 64 days	Louisiana Auditorium, New Orleans, Louisiana, US	Retained world bantamweight title
93	Draw	77–9–5 (2)	Frankie Burns	PTS	20	Dec 6, 1915	22 years, 1 day	Tulane Arena, New Orleans, Louisiana, US	Retained world bantamweight title
92	Loss	77–9–4 (2)	Memphis Pal Moore	NWS	8	Oct 28, 1915	21 years, 327 days	Phoenix A.C., Memphis, Tennessee, US	
91	Win	77–8–4 (2)	Dutch Brandt	PTS	10	Oct 5, 1915	21 years, 304 days	Lyric Theater, Baltimore, Maryland, US	
90	Loss	76–8–4 (2)	Johnny Ertle	DQ	5 (10)	Sep 10, 1915	21 years, 279 days	Auditorium, Saint Paul, Minnesota, US	World bantamweight title at stake; Referee said that Williams landed low blows and DQ'd him Both fighters claimed the title
89	Win	76–7–4 (2)	Jimmy Taylor	PTS	15	Jul 24, 1915	21 years, 231 days	Terrapin Park, Baltimore, Maryland, US	Retained world bantamweight title
88	Win	75–7–4 (2)	Jimmy Murray	NWS	10	Jun 4, 1915	21 years, 181 days	Palace Theater, Baltimore, Maryland, US	World bantamweight title at stake; (via KO only)
87	Loss	74–7–4 (2)	Louisiana	NWS	6	Apr 5, 1915	21 years, 121 days	Olympia A.C., Philadelphia, Pennsylvania, US	
86	Loss	74–6–4 (2)	Johnny Kilbane	NWS	6	Mar 17, 1915	21 years, 102 days	Olympia A.C., Philadelphia, Pennsylvania, US	
85	NC	74–5–4 (2)	Joe Superior	NC	5 (?)	Feb 25, 1915	21 years, 82 days	Bijou Theater, Atlanta, Georgia, US	
84	Win	74–5–4 (1)	Jimmy Murray	NWS	6	Feb 15, 1915	21 years, 72 days	Olympia A.C., Philadelphia, Pennsylvania, US	
83	Win	73–5–4 (1)	Eddie Wallace	NWS	10	Feb 2, 1915	21 years, 59 days	Broadway Arena, New York City, New York, US	
82	Win	72–5–4 (1)	Johnny Daly	NWS	10	Dec 25, 1914	21 years, 20 days	Pioneer Sporting Club, New York City, New York, US	
81	Win	71–5–4 (1)	Joe O'Donnell	TKO	3 (6)	Dec 19, 1914	21 years, 14 days	National A.C., Philadelphia, Pennsylvania, US	
80	Win	70–5–4 (1)	Young Freddie Diggins	TKO	3 (6)	Nov 30, 1914	20 years, 360 days	Olympia A.C., Philadelphia, Pennsylvania, US	
79	Win	69–5–4 (1)	Dutch Brandt	NWS	10	Oct 27, 1914	20 years, 326 days	Broadway S.C., New York City, New York, US	
78	Win	68–5–4 (1)	Pekin Kid Herman	KO	4 (6)	Sep 28, 1914	20 years, 297 days	Olympia A.C., Philadelphia, Pennsylvania, US	
77	Win	67–5–4 (1)	Louisiana	NWS	6	Sep 14, 1914	20 years, 283 days	Olympia A.C., Philadelphia, Pennsylvania, US	
76	Win	66–5–4 (1)	Pete Herman	NWS	10	Jun 30, 1914	20 years, 207 days	Pelican Stadium, New Orleans, Louisiana, US	
75	Win	65–5–4 (1)	Johnny Coulon	KO	3 (20)	Jun 9, 1914	20 years, 186 days	Arena, Vernon, California, US	Retained world bantamweight title claim; Won world bantamweight title
74	Draw	64–5–4 (1)	Louisiana	NWS	6	Apr 6, 1914	20 years, 122 days	Olympia A.C., Philadelphia, Pennsylvania, US	
73	Win	64–5–3 (1)	Young Freddie Diggins	NWS	6	Mar 23, 1914	20 years, 108 days	Olympia A.C., Philadelphia, Pennsylvania, US	
72	Win	63–5–3 (1)	Eddie Campi	KO	12 (20)	Jan 31, 1914	20 years, 57 days	Arena, Vernon, California, US	Retained world bantamweight title claim; Won European bantamweight title
71	Win	62–5–3 (1)	Chick Hayes	TKO	7 (15)	Jan 5, 1914	20 years, 31 days	Monumental Theatre, Baltimore, Wisconsin, US	Retained world bantamweight title claim
70	Win	61–5–3 (1)	Dick Loadman	NWS	10	Nov 27, 1913	19 years, 357 days	Riverview A.C., Milwaukee, Wisconsin, US	World bantamweight title claim at stake; (via KO only)
69	Win	60–5–3 (1)	Battling Reddy	NWS	6	Nov 24, 1913	19 years, 354 days	Olympia A.C., Philadelphia, Pennsylvania, US	
68	Win	59–5–3 (1)	Patsy Brannigan	NWS	6	Oct 25, 1913	19 years, 324 days	Old City Hall, Pittsburgh, Pennsylvania, US	
67	Win	58–5–3 (1)	Willie Mack	NWS	6	Oct 6, 1913	19 years, 305 days	Olympia A.C., Philadelphia, Pennsylvania, US	
66	Win	57–5–3 (1)	Mickey Dunn	KO	2 (15)	Oct 3, 1913	19 years, 302 days	Albaugh Theater, Baltimore, Maryland, US	Retained world bantamweight title claim
65	Win	56–5–3 (1)	Charles Ledoux	TKO	16 (20)	Jul 15, 1913	19 years, 222 days	Arena, Vernon, California, US	Claimed vacant world bantamweight title
64	Win	55–5–3 (1)	Jim Kenrick	TKO	6 (15)	Jun 11, 1913	19 years, 188 days	Oriole Park, Baltimore, Maryland, US	
63	Win	54–5–3 (1)	Young Freddie Diggins	KO	4 (15)	May 14, 1913	19 years, 160 days	Empire Theater, Baltimore, Maryland, US	
62	Win	53–5–3 (1)	Louisiana	NWS	6	Apr 26, 1913	19 years, 142 days	National A.C., Philadelphia, Pennsylvania, US	
61	Draw	52–5–3 (1)	Frank Bradley	NWS	6	Apr 14, 1913	19 years, 130 days	Olympia A.C., Philadelphia, Pennsylvania, US	
60	Win	52–5–2 (1)	Frankie Conway	NWS	6	Mar 29, 1913	19 years, 114 days	National A.C., Philadelphia, Pennsylvania, US	
59	Win	51–5–2 (1)	Eddie Campi	PTS	20	Feb 12, 1913	19 years, 69 days	Arena, Vernon, California, US	
58	Win	50–5–2 (1)	Frankie Conway	NWS	6	Jan 4, 1913	19 years, 30 days	National A.C., Philadelphia, Pennsylvania, US	
57	Win	49–5–2 (1)	Charles Ledoux	NWS	6	Dec 11, 1912	19 years, 6 days	National A.C., Philadelphia, Pennsylvania, US	
56	Win	48–5–2 (1)	Harry Smith	NWS	6	Nov 22, 1912	18 years, 353 days	Olympia A.C., Philadelphia, Pennsylvania, US	
55	Win	47–5–2 (1)	Billy Fitzsimmons	NWS	10	Nov 6, 1912	18 years, 337 days	Fairmont A.C., New York City, New York, US	
54	Win	46–5–2 (1)	Johnny Hughes	NWS	6	Nov 1, 1912	18 years, 332 days	Olympia A.C., Philadelphia, Pennsylvania, US	
53	Win	45–5–2 (1)	Johnny Coulon	NWS	10	Oct 18, 1912	18 years, 318 days	Madison Square Garden, New York City, New York, US	World bantamweight title at stake; (via KO only)
52	Win	44–5–2 (1)	Young Freddie Diggins	NWS	6	Sep 24, 1912	18 years, 294 days	Spring Garden A.C., Philadelphia, Pennsylvania, US	
51	Win	43–5–2 (1)	Billy Fitzsimmons	TKO	8 (10)	Sep 16, 1912	18 years, 286 days	Madison Square Garden, New York City, New York, US	
50	Win	42–5–2 (1)	Mickey Brown	TKO	8 (?)	Sep 4, 1912	18 years, 274 days	St. Nicholas Arena, New York City, New York, US	
49	Win	41–5–2 (1)	Kid Kelly	TKO	9 (10)	Aug 26, 1912	18 years, 265 days	Madison Square Garden, New York City, New York, US	
48	Win	40–5–2 (1)	Battling Reddy	NWS	10	Aug 17, 1912	18 years, 256 days	St. Nicholas Arena, New York City, New York, US	
47	Win	39–5–2 (1)	Young Mickey McDonough	TKO	5 (10)	Aug 9, 1912	18 years, 248 days	Albaugh's Theater, Baltimore, Maryland, US	
46	Win	38–5–2 (1)	Johnny Solzberg	RTD	7 (10)	Jul 29, 1912	18 years, 237 days	Madison Square Garden, New York City, New York, US	
45	Win	37–5–2 (1)	Artie Edwards	TKO	8 (10)	Jul 20, 1912	18 years, 228 days	Fairmont A.C., New York City, New York, US	
44	Win	36–5–2 (1)	Charley Goldman	PTS	15	May 31, 1912	18 years, 178 days	Albaugh Theater, Baltimore, Maryland, US	
43	Win	35–5–2 (1)	Young Ketchel	KO	2 (15)	May 2, 1912	18 years, 149 days	Holliday Street Theatre, Baltimore, Maryland, US	
42	Win	34–5–2 (1)	Battling Reddy	NWS	10	Apr 23, 1912	18 years, 140 days	St. Nicholas Arena, New York City, New York, US	
41	Win	33–5–2 (1)	Johnny Daly	PTS	15	Apr 9, 1912	18 years, 126 days	Albaugh Theater, Baltimore, Maryland, US	
40	Win	32–5–2 (1)	Kohoma Kid	KO	4 (15)	Mar 6, 1912	18 years, 92 days	Albaugh Theater, Baltimore, Maryland, US	
39	Win	31–5–2 (1)	Young Joe Stanley	NWS	10	Feb 10, 1912	18 years, 67 days	Fairmont A.C., New York City, New York, US	
38	Loss	30–5–2 (1)	Johnny Solzberg	NWS	10	Jan 30, 1912	18 years, 56 days	Royale A.C., New York City, New York, US	
37	Win	30–4–2 (1)	Benny Reilly	KO	12 (15)	Jan 19, 1912	18 years, 45 days	Baltimore, Maryland, US	
36	Win	29–4–2 (1)	Young Mickey McDonough	NWS	10	Jan 17, 1912	18 years, 43 days	Royale A.C., New York City, New York, US	
35	Draw	28–4–2 (1)	Charley Harvey	NWS	10	Jan 15, 1912	18 years, 41 days	Brooklyn Beach A.C., New York City, New York, US	
34	Win	28–4–1 (1)	Banty Lewis	NWS	10	Jan 6, 1912	18 years, 32 days	Fairmont A.C., New York City, New York, US	
33	Win	27–4–1 (1)	Barry Hill	NWS	10	Dec 23, 1911	18 years, 18 days	Fairmont A.C., New York City, New York, US	
32	Win	26–4–1 (1)	Eddie McCloskey	PTS	6	Nov 24, 1911	17 years, 354 days	Germania Maennerchor Hall, Baltimore, Maryland, US	
31	Win	25–4–1 (1)	Frankie Smith	TKO	6 (6)	Nov 10, 1911	17 years, 340 days	Germania Maennerchor Hall, Baltimore, Maryland, US	
30	Win	24–4–1 (1)	Barry Hill	PTS	15	Oct 30, 1911	17 years, 329 days	Germania Maennerchor Hall, Baltimore, Maryland, US	
29	Win	23–4–1 (1)	Paddy Mitchell	NWS	6	Oct 2, 1911	17 years, 301 days	Brooklyn Beach A.C., New York City, New York, US	
28	Win	22–4–1 (1)	Willie Carroll	KO	2 (6)	Sep 4, 1911	17 years, 273 days	Brighton Beach A.C., Brighton Beach, Indiana, US	
27	ND	21–4–1 (1)	K.O. Sweeney	ND	10	Aug 19, 1911	17 years, 257 days	New York City, New York, US	
26	Win	21–4–1	Willie Faust	KO	4 (6)	Aug 15, 1911	17 years, 253 days	Twentieth Century A.C., New York City, New York, US	
25	Win	20–4–1	Johnny Solzberg	NWS	10	Aug 7, 1911	17 years, 245 days	Brooklyn Beach A.C., New York City, New York, US	
24	Win	19–4–1	Willie Carroll	KO	4 (6)	Aug 1, 1911	17 years, 239 days	20th Century A.C., New York City, New York, US	
23	Win	18–4–1	Babe Davis	KO	1 (?)	Jul 31, 1911	17 years, 238 days	Perth Amboy, New Jersey, US	
22	Win	17–4–1	Babe Davis	TKO	5 (?)	Jul 28, 1911	17 years, 235 days	Twentieth Century A.C., New York City, New York, US	
21	Win	16–4–1	Young Packey McFarland	KO	5 (?)	Jul 27, 1911	17 years, 234 days	New York City, New York, US	
20	Loss	15–4–1	George K.O. Chaney	PTS	20	Jul 10, 1911	17 years, 217 days	Ford Opera House, Baltimore, Maryland, US	
19	Win	15–3–1	Kid Murphy	PTS	15	May 26, 1911	17 years, 172 days	Monumental Theater, Baltimore, Maryland, US	
18	Win	14–3–1	Jimmy Cross	KO	5 (10)	Mar 21, 1911	17 years, 106 days	Germania Maennerchor Hall, Baltimore, Maryland, US	
17	Loss	13–3–1	Charley Harvey	PTS	15	Mar 14, 1911	17 years, 99 days	Germania Maennerchor Hall, Baltimore, Maryland, US	
16	Win	13–2–1	Leo Walton	KO	3 (10)	Feb 20, 1911	17 years, 77 days	Albaugh Theater, Baltimore, Maryland, US	
15	Loss	12–2–1	George K.O. Chaney	KO	6 (15)	Jan 2, 1911	17 years, 28 days	Germania Maennerchor Hall, Baltimore, Maryland, US	
14	Win	12–1–1	Tommy Buck	NWS	10	Nov 29, 1910	16 years, 359 days	Albaugh Theater, Baltimore, Maryland, US	
13	Win	11–1–1	Frank Bradley	KO	5 (15)	Nov 1, 1910	16 years, 331 days	Princess Theater, Baltimore, Maryland, US	
12	Draw	10–1–1	Tommy Buck	PTS	15	Oct 11, 1910	16 years, 310 days	Albaugh Theater, Baltimore, Maryland, US	
11	Win	10–1	Babe Stinger	KO	5 (6)	Oct 4, 1910	16 years, 303 days	Albaugh Theater, Baltimore, Maryland, US	
10	Win	9–1	Buck Kirchener	TKO	4 (6)	Sep 26, 1910	16 years, 295 days	Albaugh Theater, Baltimore, Maryland, US	
9	Win	8–1	Sammy Miller	KO	1 (6)	Sep 12, 1910	16 years, 281 days	Albaugh Theater, Baltimore, Maryland, US	
8	Win	7–1	Buddy Jones	KO	2 (6)	Sep 12, 1910	16 years, 281 days	Albaugh Theater, Baltimore, Maryland, US	
7	Win	6–1	Joe Britton	KO	1 (?)	Sep 12, 1910	16 years, 281 days	Albaugh Theater, Baltimore, Maryland, US	
6	Win	5–1	Sammy Miller	KO	1 (6)	Sep 12, 1910	16 years, 281 days	Albaugh Theater, Baltimore, Maryland, US	
5	Loss	4–1	Tommy Buck	NWS	6	Aug 29, 1910	16 years, 267 days	Albaugh Theater, Baltimore, Maryland, US	
4	Win	4–0	Shep Farren	KO	6 (6)	Aug 22, 1910	16 years, 260 days	Germania Maennerchor Hall, Baltimore, Maryland, US	
3	Win	3–0	Young McFarland	TKO	1 (6)	Aug 9, 1910	16 years, 247 days	Oriole Park, Baltimore, Maryland, US	
2	Win	2–0	Ike Miller	KO	2 (6)	Aug 1, 1910	16 years, 239 days	Oriole Park, Baltimore, Maryland, US	
1	Win	1–0	Shep Farren	KO	5 (6)	Jul 25, 1910	16 years, 232 days	Oriole Park, Baltimore, Maryland, US	

== See also ==
- List of bantamweight boxing champions

Achievements
Preceded by Johnny Coulon	World Bantamweight Champion; June 9, 1914 – January 9, 1917	Succeeded by Kid Herman
