= Waldtraut Oertel =

German diver (1936–2026)

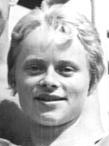
- Oertel in 1960

Personal information
- Born: Waldtraut Skrzipek; 14 October 1936 Halle (Saale), Gau Halle-Merseburg, Germany
- Died: 22 July 2026 (aged 89)
- Height: 1.57 m (5 ft 2 in)
- Weight: 52 kg (115 lb)
- Spouse: Rudi Oertel (m. 1954)

Sport
- Sport: Diving
- Club: Motor Mitte Halle; SC Wismut Karl-Marx-Stadt

Waldtraut Oertel (née Skrzipek, 14 October 1936 – 22 July 2026), also spelled Waltraud Oertel, was a German diver. She competed in the springboard at the 1960 Summer Olympics, representing the United Team of Germany, and finished in 10th place.

Her husband Rudi Oertel competed at the 1960 Olympics in men's springboard. They married around late 1954, when she changed her last name and club. She won four national titles in East Germany between 1952 and 1955.

After retiring from her active career, Oertel was a diving and swimming coach in her husband's home town, Gera. She died on 22 July 2026, at the age of 89.
